= M8 armored gun system =

American light tank

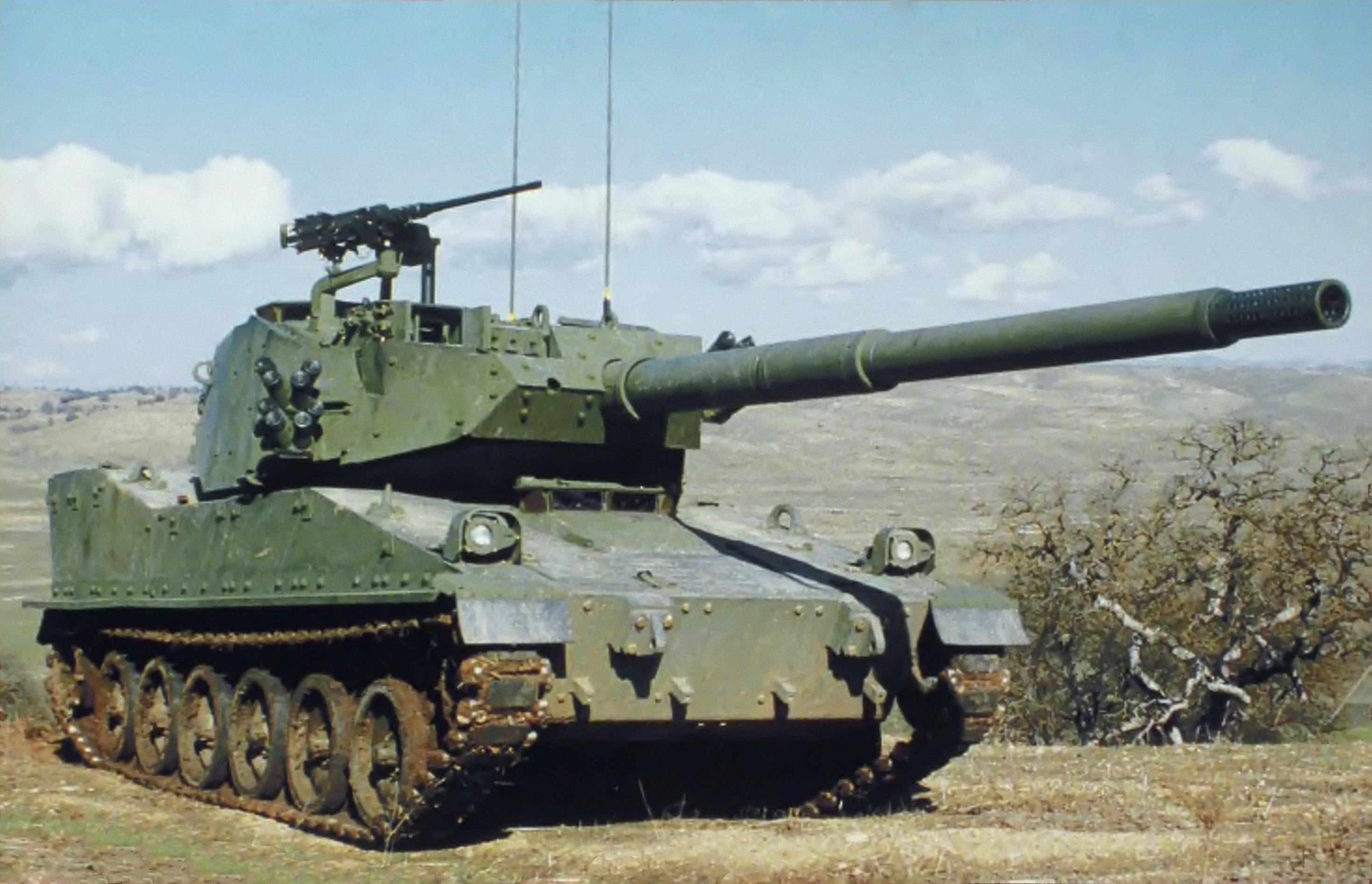
- M8 AGS
- Type: Light tank (Note: The Army discouraged using the term "light tank" to describe the M8. In a hearing before the subcommittee of the Committee on Appropriations of the U.S. Senate in April 1991, General Pete McVey said, "The Army does not have a requirement for a light tank. A combat vehicle with all of the fightability features of a tank would result in a vehicle which is too heavy for light forces. What the Army is developing is an Armored Gun System (AGS) which will be a strategically deployable, lightly armored, highly mobile direct fire system. The primary mission of the Armored Gun System will be to provide direct fire support for airborne and light infantry forces." However, Field Manual 17-18 Light Armor Operations (1994) refers to the vehicle as the "M8 Light Tank".)
- Place of origin: United States

Production history
- Designer: FMC Corporation/United Defense LP/BAE Systems
- Designed: From 1983
- Manufacturer: FMC/United Defense/BAE Systems
- Produced: 1995, 2020
- No. built: 6 AGS pilots, 1 austere prototype, ≥11 MPF (Note: Twelve were ordered of which at least eleven were built according to MPF project manager LTC Peter George.)

Specifications (M8 AGS)
- Mass: 36,900 to 39,800 lb (16,740 to 18,050 kg) (level 1 armor); 44,000 to 44,270 lb (19,960 to 20,080 kg) (level II); 52,000 lb (23,590 kg) (level III)
- Length: 261 in (6.64 m) (level 1 hull + gun forward), 242 in (6.14 m) (level 1 hull only)
- Width: 104 in (2.64 m) (over fenders)
- Height: 100 to 101 in (2.54 to 2.57 m) (over cupola)
- Crew: 3 (commander, gunner, driver)
- Elevation: +20° / -10° (depression limited over rear arc)
- Armor: Welded 5083 aluminum alloy
- Main armament: M35 105 mm caliber soft recoil rifled gun (31 rounds)
- Secondary armament: 7.62 mm coaxial M240 (4,500 rounds); 0.50 caliber (12.7 mm) commander's M2 Browning (600 rounds)
- Engine: Detroit Diesel 6V 92TA; 550 hp (410 kW) at 2,400 rpm (JP-8 fuel), 580 hp (430 kW) at 2,400 rpm (diesel)
- Power/weight: 28.3 hp/ST (23.3 kW/t) (Level I)
- Transmission: General Electric HMPT-500-3EC
- Suspension: Torsion bar
- Ground clearance: Up to 17 in (430 mm)
- Fuel capacity: 150 US gal (570 L; 120 imp gal)
- Operational range: 300 mi (480 km)
- Maximum speed: Road: 45 mph (72 km/h)

The M8 armored gun system (AGS), sometimes known as the Buford, is an American light tank that was intended to replace the M551 Sheridan and TOW missile-armed Humvees in the 82nd Airborne Division and 2nd Armored Cavalry Regiment (2nd ACR) of the U.S. Army respectively.

The M8 AGS began as a private venture of FMC Corporation, called the close combat vehicle light (CCVL), in 1983. The Army began the armored gun system program to develop a mobile gun platform that could be airdropped. By 1992, the AGS was one of the Army's top priority acquisition programs. The service selected FMC's CCVL over proposals from three other teams. The service sought to purchase 237 AGS systems to begin fielding in 1997. Key characteristics of the AGS are its light weight (17.8 short tons (16.1 t) in its low-velocity airdrop configuration), field-installable modular armor, M35 105 mm caliber soft recoil rifled gun, 21-round magazined autoloader, and slide-out powerpack.

Though it had authorized the start of production of the type classified M8 a year earlier, the Army canceled the AGS program in 1996 due to the service's budgetary constraints. The Sheridan was retired without a true successor. The AGS never saw service, though the 82nd Airborne sought to press the preproduction units into service in Iraq. The AGS was unsuccessfully marketed for export and was reincarnated for several subsequent U.S. Army assault gun/light tank programs. United Defense LP proposed the AGS as the Mobile Gun System (MGS) variant of the Interim Armored Vehicle program in 2000, but lost out to the General Motors–General Dynamics' LAV III, which was type classified as the Stryker M1128 mobile gun system. BAE Systems offered the AGS system for the Army's XM1302 Mobile Protected Firepower requirement, but lost to the General Dynamics Griffin II—later type classified as the M10 Booker—in 2022.

== Development ==
The U.S. Army recognized the poor performance of the M551 Sheridan light tank in the Vietnam War and began the process of retiring the vehicle in 1977. A small number of Sheridans were retained in active service by the 82nd Airborne Division and the National Guard. (Note: By 1985, the Army had about 800 Sheridans, 750 of which were in storage. The 82nd Airborne retained 50 in active service.) The Army designated the M3 Bradley armored reconnaissance vehicle to partially fill the Sheridan's role.

=== Initial efforts ===
In the 1980s, the Army began looking for a more capable replacement for the Sheridan. During this time, a string of Army projects to update or replace the Sheridan were begun, but all ended without the Army committing to buy. Some of its efforts around this time could be described as hopelessly intermingled.

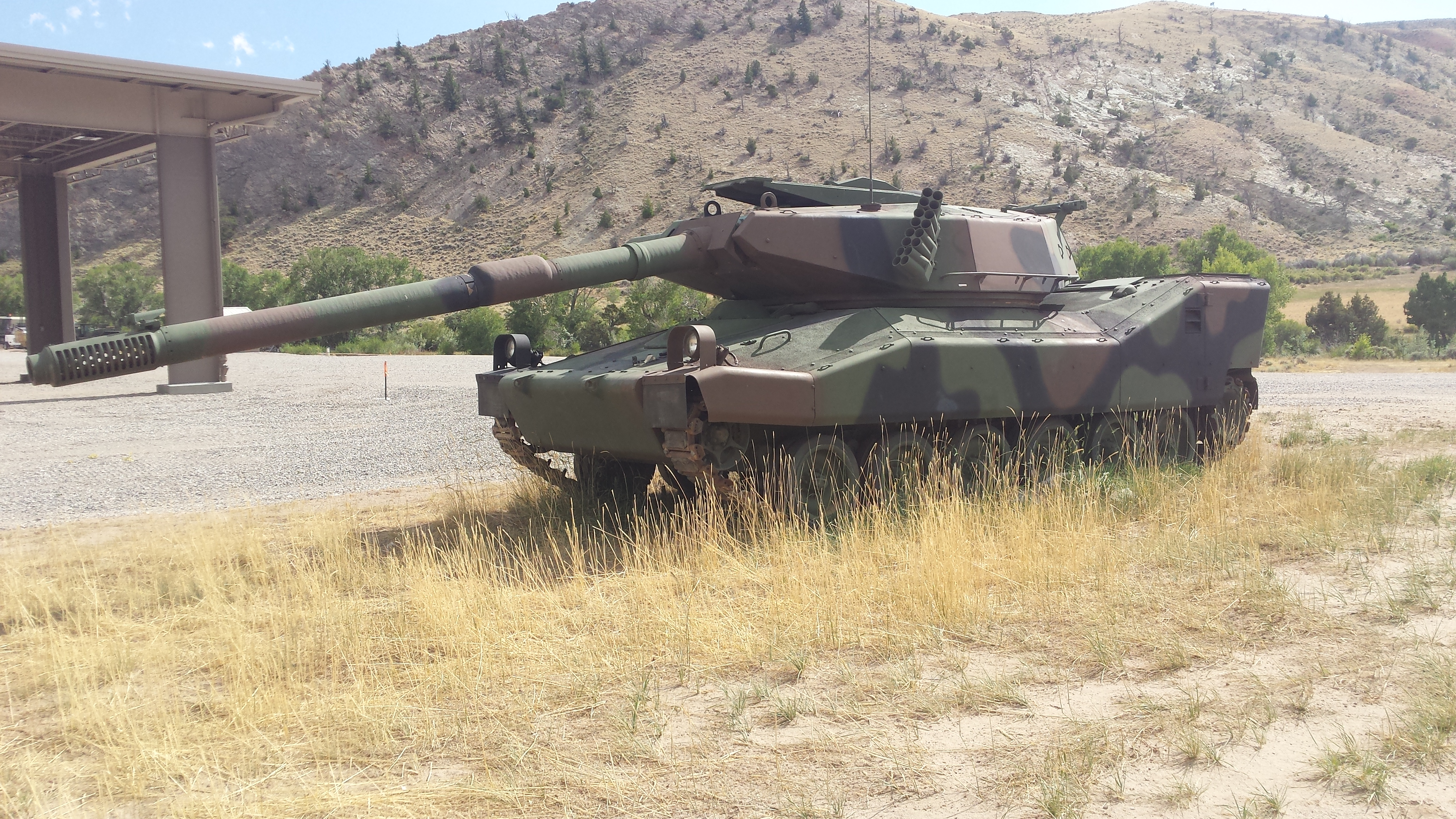
CCVL at the National Museum of Military Vehicles in 2020

View of inside of the CCVL

External images
- Photos of the CCVL from a private collection.
- gallery #2
- gallery #3

In 1979, Army Chief of Staff General Edward C. Meyer initiated a transformation of the 9th Infantry Division that would see the light infantry division assume many of the characteristics of the heavy division through an infusion of high or emerging technology. The so-called "High Technology Light Division" (HTLD) would require the procurement of a Mobile Protected Gun, later called the Assault Gun System (AGS), and a Fast Attack Vehicle. The notional Mobile Protected Gun was to be armed with a kinetic gun, or possibly a missile, capable of defeating enemy armor.

The lack of a production-ready assault gun was one of the key problems in the development of the division. Originally conceived to be a wheeled light armored vehicle armed with a hypervelocity missile as its major tank-killing system. (Note: The Assault Gun received little support from the Armor School, which was more invested in the M1 Abrams tank program, or from the U.S. Army Missile Command, which was less interested in hypervelocity missiles development given its focus on developing the Fiber Optic Guided Missile) In 1980, the U.S. Army Infantry School's Mobile Protected Gun project analyzed anti-armor weapons systems, concluding that the Army should equip its new light infantry divisions with TOW-armed Humvees and an unspecified 6×6 lightly armored vehicle armed with a 25 mm caliber gun. This led the Secretary of Defense to direct the Army to use the LAV-25 for this purpose. In 1981, the Army joined the Marine Corps's (USMC) Mobile Protected Weapon System program, which then became known as the Mobile Protected Gun System (MPGS). However due to differing requirements, the Army and USMC ended their partnership the following year to embark on separate programs.

The Army and Marine Corps were at the same time also involved in the joint LAV program. At the time, the Army planned to acquire 175 LAV-25s to fully equip the 9th Infantry Division. These interim MPGS's would be armed with a M242 Bushmaster 25 mm cannon, with seating for the passengers replaced with ammunition racks. The Army planned to incorporate the LAV in the 9th Infantry Division as an interim armored gun system. (Note: Before the 25 mm Bushmaster gun was selected versions with 75 mm, 90 mm and 105 mm guns were studied, with the Marine Corps leaning toward a 75 mm gun-armed version and the Army a 90 mm gun.) (Note: In 1987, the Army tested a version of the LAV-25 designated as the M1047. The Army determined that these were unsuitable for LAPES and, with only a 25 mm caliber cannon, could not match the firepower of the Sheridan. Congress did not favor the M1047, though a few were deployed with the 3/73rd Armor of the 82nd Airborne Division in the Gulf War.) The Army planned to replace this LAV beginning in the late 1980s with the "far-term" MPGS armed with a 75 mm gun. The Army's commitment to the program wavered somewhat, which caused Congress to withhold money for the LAV. The Army withdrew from the LAV program in December 1983.

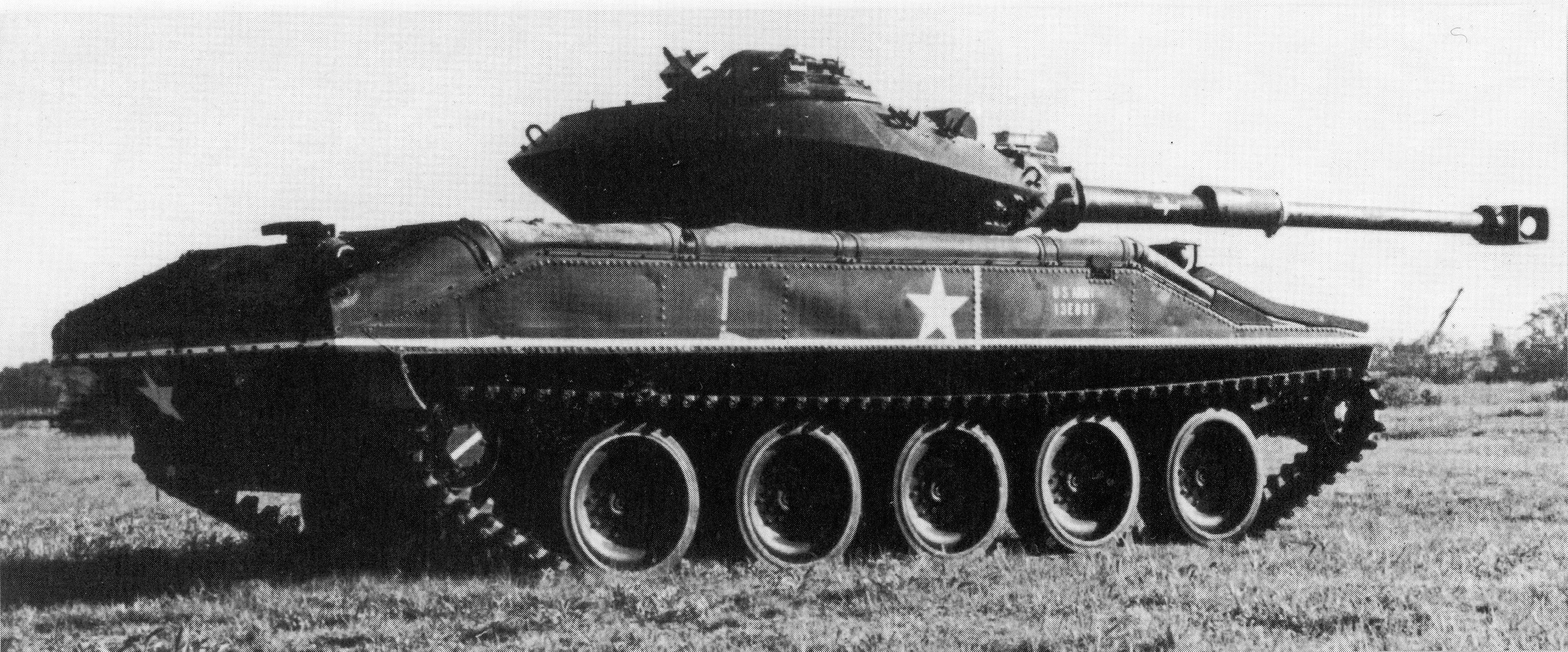
A Navy Surface Weapons Center M551 Sheridan mounting a 105 mm caliber gun in 1983

Modernization of the Sheridan was also studied by the Infantry School. The chassis of the Sheridan was considered to be in good working order even if its problematic 152 mm caliber gun/launcher was not. Both the Marine Corps and Army explored re-gunning the Sheridan with a conventional gun. In 1983, the Navy Surface Weapons Center mounted a 105 mm cannon to a Sheridan. One Army plan also envisioned re-gunning 120 Sheridans with 105 mm or 120 mm cannons, but this project was canceled in 1985. In any event the Army determined upgrading the Sheridan to meet the AGS requirement was not worth pursuing.

The U.S. Army determined that it needed a more immediate solution for the AGS requirement. In 1985, the Army approved a U.S. Army Training and Doctrine Command (TRADOC) recommendation to field the TOW missile-armed Humvee in the interim. The TOW-armed Humvee proved to be an inadequate substitute for the AGS in the 9th Infantry Division as it could not fire on the move and was too lightly armored.

By 1983 the Armor School had come to support an Assault Gun. Instead of wheeled, it would be a tracked, lightweight, highly agile kinetic energy gun capable of killing enemy tanks and shielded by sufficient armor to protection the crew from artillery and small caliber weapons. The system had to be light enough to fly in a C-130 aircraft. After the Army and Marine Corps parted ways on MPGS, the project morphed into the Armored/Assault Gun System. (Note: The Infantry School referred to the system as the Assault Gun while the Armor School favored the more "tank-like" title of Armored Gun.) In 1983, the Army established the AGS program, sometimes called XM4. In 1985, Army Vice Chief of Staff General Maxwell R. Thurman approved an amended requirement operational capability (ROC) for the AGS. Thurman's recommendation that the Army purchase 500 AGS systems went to Army Chief of Staff John A. Wickham Jr.. (Note: Possible destinations for the 500 AGS systems were the 82nd Airborne, the 9th Infantry Division (Motorized) or the 101st Airborne Division.) The Abrams competed with the AGS for funding. Wickham and Thurman, backed by TRADOC, chose the Abrams, and did not advocate for the program in Congress. Senate appropriators declined the Army's request for AGS funds for FY1986. The program office was disestablished, and the ROC retracted. In May 1986, the AGS program was re-organized under the Armored Family of Vehicles Task Force (AFVTV). During one concept study for a proposed All Purpose Fire Support Platoon, the task force shortlisted four candidate vehicles for an Armored Support Platform. These were the FMC Corporation CCVL, the Cadillac Gage Stingray, the General Motors LAV-105, and the Teledyne AGS. The task force recommended the latter.

In August 1987, the Office of the Secretary of Defense approved the AGS program initiative for 600 vehicles—166 for the 9th Infantry Division (Motorized), 54 for the 82d Airborne Division, 217 for reserve component Tow Light Anti-tank Battalions (TLAT) and 163 for war reserves and floats. A joint Army–Marine Corps program was mooted. The ROC was approved for the second time in September. In December, the AGS program was dropped as the $800 million ($2.27 billion in 2025) plan was considered unaffordable. Around the same time, the Army Chief of Staff Carl E. Vuono issued a "promissory note" to replace the Sheridan by FY1995.

=== Rebooted program ===
In September 1989, the Armored Gun System Project Manager office was reestablished at the United States Army Tank-automotive and Armaments Command and a marketing survey was distributed to industry. (Note: TRADOC System Manager was Colonel Eugene D. Colgan from March 1991; Colonel Charles F. Moler from July 1992; and Colonel John F. Kalb from July 1995.) In March 1990, Vuono told the Senate Appropriations Defense Subcommittee that the Army was surveying options for acquiring about 70 tanks to replace the Sheridan. The Army formalized the AGS program in April 1990 with the validation of a new ROC. An AGS "rodeo" was held in July 1990 at Fort Bragg, North Carolina, with representative systems submitted from prospective contractors.

Draft AGS requirements dated October 1990

In July 1990, the Senate Armed Services Committee (SASC) required that the Army procure the AGS off-the-shelf. In August, SASC directed the Army to halt work on Armored Systems Modernization until it could conduct a competition for an AGS. The AGS program had gained political favor by this point due in part to the back-to-back successful employment of the Sheridan in two overseas operations. In December 1989, Sheridans of the 3/73 Armor, 82d Airborne Division, were airdropped into Panama as part of Operation Just Cause. This was the first successful employment of light armor in combat. In August 1990, Sheridans were airdropped into Saudi Arabia as the spearhead of the buildup of Operation Desert Shield. In October 1990, HASC deferred the Block III main battle tank and directed the Army to make the AGS its top priority modernization program. After having earlier tried to kill the tank, appropriators grew to appreciate the program's relatively low price tag.

In November 1990, the Defense Acquisition Board authorized the Army to proceed with the development of the AGS. The Army believed that replacing the Sheridan with an off-the-shelf AGS would be less expensive and provide more capabilities than an upgraded Sheridan. It was expected to replace the Sheridan in the 3/73rd Armor and TOW missile-armed Humvees in the 2nd Armored Cavalry Regiment (2nd ACR).

In November 1990, Congressional appropriators sought for the Army to utilize the Marine Corps's developmental LAV-105 for the AGS role or "show clear and convincing evidence that the LAV-105 is unable to fulfill the requirement". (Note: The Army claimed that the LAV–Assault Gun/LAV-105 would need additional armor to meet its protection requirements. In addition to pushing the vehicle past its maximum design weight limit, the added weight would make the LAV–AG too heavy to be lifted by the Marine Corps' CH–53E helicopter. The Marine Corps said that although the LAV–AG could theoretically be deployed via LAPES/LVAD, the vehicle would require an hour to be made combat ready after airdrop. The Army required a vehicle that could be made ready much sooner.) (Note: The Marine Corps claimed that the LAV-105 could be airdropped.) The Army agreed. In 1991, the Senate and House Armed Services Committees joined in directing the Army to integrate the turret and Watervliet Arsenal EX35 gun of the LAV-105 with an AGS chassis. A joint program was balked at by both services, who believed the two platforms were mismatched. Subsequently, the Marine Corps demurred and requested no further funding for the LAV-105. In any event, the proposed chimera was nixed by the Senate Appropriations Committee later that year.

The Army issued a draft request for proposals (RfP) in May 1991. The Army published the RfP in August incorporating changes as a result of feedback from industry and Congress, the latter of which had directed the Army to require the EX35 gun. Army Acquisition Executive Stephen K. Conver became concerned that the AGS program was becoming laden with unnecessary requirements that would increase costs and development time, as well as limit the number of interested contractors. In view of this, in October 1991, Conver's office conducted a review of the requirements. The Army updated its RfP later that year, with submissions due in December.

The final RfP specified two configurations of the AGS: One intended for airborne forces, and another intended for other rapid deployment light forces.

FMC Corporation submitted the CCVL to meet the AGS requirement. Three other teams submitted proposals:

- General Dynamics Land Systems (GDLS) and Teledyne Continental Motors submitted a version of the Teledyne tank included in the AFVTV study. (Note: GDLS was the prime contractor. Teledyne had been the prime contractor for its own MPGS proposal) GDLS's design was unconventional with the powerpack mounted in the front, and an externally mounted cannon. The crew was located in the turret basket below the hull line. (Note: As of 1990, Teledyne marketed its AGS candidate as the Direct Fire Support Vehicle. It had a Cummins eight-cylinder turbocharged diesel with General Electric transmission. The gunner and tank commander were located in the turret basket for added protection.)
- Cadillac Gage Textron submitted the Commando Stingray with the LAV-105 turret. (Note: The design entered into the competition was armed with an XM35 105 mm gun, though an earlier proposed model mounted a Royal Ordnance L7 105 mm Low Recoil Force cannon. It was powered by an eight-cylinder General Motors diesel engine. The torsion bar suspension is based on the M109 howitzer. The Cadloy steel armor protects the vehicle from 14.5 mm machine gun fire over the frontal arc.)
- Team Hägglunds USA submitted a variant of the Combat Vehicle 90 with a GIAT turret. This was the only version proposed without an autoloader. Series production would take place in Canada.

Three of the vehicles proposed had autoloaders, while Hägglunds did not. Although the Army did not require that proposals be tracked or wheeled, all four proposals were tracked.

In June 1992, the Army selected the FMC proposal. FMC Ground Systems Division was awarded a $27.7 million ($63.6 million in 2025) contract to begin phase 1 work, including the production of six test units. The bids for this phase ranged from a high of $189 million ($434 million in 2025) for GDLS–Teledyne and a low of $92 million ($211 million in 2025) for Hägglunds. The procurement program was valued at $800 million.

=== Close combat vehicle light becomes the AGS ===
A mockup of the CCVL

FMC began developing the CCVL as a private venture in 1983. The vehicle was designed from the outset to meet the Army's as-yet unfunded AGS requirement. FMC built two mock-ups. The first was a front-engine model utilizing a 330 hp (250 kW) diesel engine. The second was a rear-engine model with a 552 hp (412 kW) diesel engine and featuring more armor. In 1984, FMC validated the feasibility of pairing the 105 mm gun with a light chassis by test firing a 105 mm gun mounted on an M548. The first prototype CCVL was completed in August 1985 and debuted at the meeting of the Association of the United States Army in October. (Note: The 1985–86 edition of Jane's Armour and Artillery labels this private venture as the "FMC XM4 Armoured Gun System".) The CCVL was demonstrated at Fort Bragg, North Carolina, in 1987. FMC subsequently ended the marketing of the vehicle and disassembled the prototype. A prototype participated in an AGS "rodeo" with other prospective contractors held in July 1990 at Fort Bragg, North Carolina. This was the only submitted vehicle that was considered complete.

The Army required the AGS to be airdroppable from a tactical airlifter. C-130 airdrop was a desired capability, but not a required one. FMC claimed it could achieve C-130 airdroppability and so such a requirement was written into FMC's contract. FMC made several weight-saving changes to the design, particularly the pallets, in order to meet the C-130's weight limit. In a December 1993 report, the Defense Department Inspector General (IG) cautioned that the AGS would be too heavy for low-velocity airdrop (LVAD). The IG recommended canceling 58 systems meant for the XVIII Airborne Corps if the Army could not demonstrate LVAD from a C-130. The Pentagon concurred that no production could begin until the Army met this requirement. The IG's concerns were put to rest in October 1994, when the service successfully airdropped an AGS from a C-130 at an altitude of 1,300 ft (400 m).

Citing cuts in the service's procurement budget, in 1993, the Army reduced its planned AGS order from 300 to 233. By November the Army had successfully overhauled the program. By reclassifying the preproduction prototypes as production models, the Army was able to cut two years off the time until full-scale production. The Army had by then settled on an acquisition target of 237 vehicles. Of these, 123 would go to the 2nd Armored Cavalry Regiment, 58 to the 82nd Airborne Division, and 56 to reserves and training bases. The last 169 AGS systems, to be produced from 1998 to 2002, were to be built without the weight-saving modifications of those destined for the 82nd, which was the only unit that required an airdroppable AGS system. The AGS's budget was zeroed and the production schedule slipped by one year in Congress's FY1995 budget due to program cost growth.

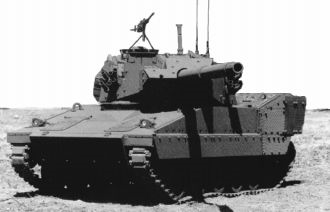
XM8 preproduction model in 1994

Six prototypes were built under the designation XM8. The first of these was rolled out at the United Defense (created by a merger of FMC and BMY) facility in San Jose, California, in April 1994, (Note: For production vehicles, UDLP was expected to machine the AGS hull and turret, and fabricate its armor plate at the San Jose facility, and then ship the as-is structure to York, Pennsylvania. The York facility would perform integration, assembly, and acceptance testing.) and arrived at Fort Knox, Kentucky, in April 1995. The last of these was delivered in May. United Defense provided five XM8 AGS systems to the service's Operational Test Command, which put the vehicle through five months of testing at Fort Pickett, Virginia. Another prototype underwent survivability testing at Aberdeen Proving Ground, Maryland.

=== Cancelation ===
In 1995, the Army explored inactivating the 2nd ACR, which would reduce the Army's buy to just the 80 AGS systems destined for the 82nd Airborne. In May 1995, the Army National Guard expressed interest in procuring the AGS for the 38th Infantry Division, 35th Infantry Division and 34th Infantry Division to help bridge the looming capability gap should the 2nd ACR be eliminated. This proposal was rejected by the service. Army Chief of Staff Gordon R. Sullivan, the AGS's most influential advocate at the Pentagon, retired in June 1995. In October 1995, the Army type classified the XM8 as the M8 armored gun system. It approved an initial production run of 26 vehicles, with an option for 42 more scheduled to begin in FY1997. A full production decision was scheduled for March 1997. Fielding to the 3/73 Armor would begin in 1999. All three squadrons of the 2nd ACR were to be fielded subsequently.

AGS production schedule as of 1995
Year	Orders	Deliveries
1996	26	0
1997	42	4
1998	33	31
1999	40	40
2000	40	35
2001	35	40
2002	21	39
2003	0	36
2004	0	12

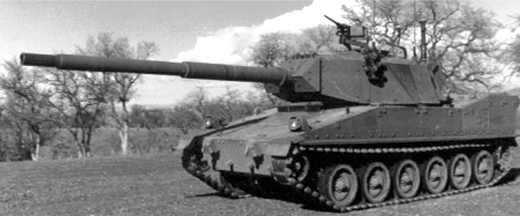
AGS pre-production unit c. 1994

The United States enjoyed a peace dividend following the collapse of the Soviet Union in 1991. Absent another credible major foreign adversary, American spending on defense dried up. the President's FY1996 budget request allotted the Department of Defense (DoD) the lowest procurement budget level since 1950. The AGS was one of several systems that did not fare well in an Army review of anti-armor weapons then under development. Responding to budget cuts anticipated in the period FY98–03, in 1996 the Army adopted a new policy: Instead of distributing small cuts throughout many projects, entire programs would be canceled.

Army Chief of Staff Dennis Reimer canceled the AGS in January 1996. In an email explaining the cancelation to officers, Reimer said the AGS was a "well run program" and that the Army had "no major complaints with the way that program was being administered." Reimer said that despite this, the Army had a funding shortfall in both the near and long term. Canceling the AGS would allow the service to alleviate a deficit in the military personnel account. It would also free up funds for other modernization efforts in the far term.

Many officials felt blindsided by the Army's decision to kill the AGS. The Army's decision to cancel the AGS went without a formal announcement but was soon leaked to the press. This displeased some lawmakers including Senate Armed Services Committee chairman Strom Thurmond, who privately expressed irritation to Defense Secretary William J. Perry about having learned of the cancelation through media reports. Ten Representatives signed a letter urging Perry to continue the program. The letter touted the program's "tremendous success" in meeting the program's objectives, and noted that the vehicle was "well within budget and on schedule." The House appropriations national security subcommittee requested that the DoD pause the cancelation of the AGS pending a Congressional review. The subcommittee said that the AGS had met its milestones and "would be a strong candidate for increased funding."

The Army belatedly sought to win Congressional and DoD support for its decision to cancel the tank. Securing the blessings of the Office of the Secretary of Defense would ensure that the service would not have to forfeit unspent FY1996 funds from the AGS program. The DoD, at least at first, affirmed its support for the program and called it "premature" for any service branch to draw any conclusions about the outyear funding environment. However, in February the DoD's Joint Requirements Oversight Council (JROC) endorsed the Army's decision. Despite JROC's recommendation, Perry withheld his support for canceling the AGS until he could personally meet with key congressmen. Perry's office said it would review the Army's plans for the $1 billion originally earmarked for the AGS before making a decision.

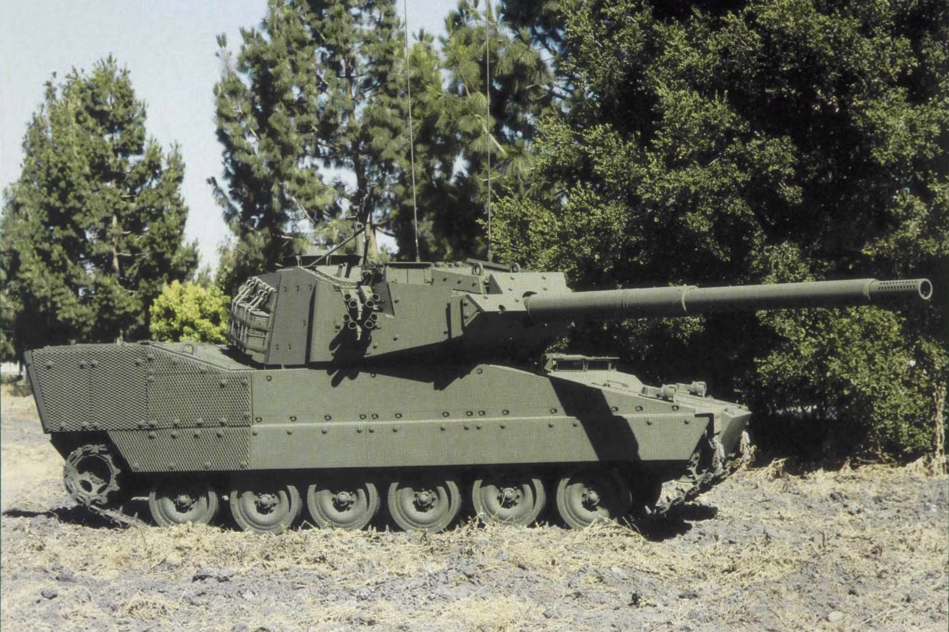
AGS pre-production unit in level II armor c. 1994

The Army issued a stop-work order to United Defense in February 1996. In May, the Army Vice Chief of Staff formally announced the cancelation of the AGS. The service estimated killing the program would save the Army $1 billion. The service sought to reallocate unspent FY1996 funds from the AGS program on military pay, construction and modernization programs.

In order to help offset the loss of capability caused by the cancelation of the AGS, the Army increased its requested funding for M1A2 Abrams and M2A3 Bradley upgrades, and accelerated the development of the Javelin missile. The Army considered a variety of plans to "heavy up" the 2nd ACR. The service added heavy armor to the 2nd ACR and requested funding to purchase Apache helicopters. In the 82nd Airborne, the Army also planned to introduce the EFOGM missile and considered more widely fielding the Javelin missile. Funding for EFOGM was deleted in 1998. The Army also considered the MGM-166 LOSAT missile, now mounted on a Humvee rather than the originally planned AGS, as another platform offering similar capabilities for the 82nd Airborne. However, this program was canceled in FY2005. According to Reimer, the lack of a C-130-deliverable tank was made somewhat more acceptable by the introduction of an increasing number of larger C-17's.

The 3/73rd Armor was inactivated over the following two years. The last Sheridans in service were vismod Sheridans used for opposing force training. These too were retired in 2004. Maintaining the Sheridan was not thought to be practical. In place of the Sheridan in the 82nd Airborne, the Army stood up an Immediate Ready Company of Bradley Fighting Vehicles and M1A1 Abrams tanks from the 3rd Infantry Division which were to be attached to the 82nd.

=== Milestones and schedule ===
AGS procurement budget
Year	Orders	Procurement ($M)	Advance Proc. ($M)
FY1992	–	–	–
FY1993	–	4.7 (10.80 in 2025)	–
FY1994	–	8.2 (18.30 in 2025)	7.8 (17.40 in 2025)
FY1995	–	–	–
FY1996	26	141.6 (299.20 in 2025)	–
FY1997	42	182.2 (374.00 in 2025)	–

A Milestone I/II review was completed in May 1992. The engineering and manufacturing development contract was awarded to FMC in June 1992 for a ballistic structure, six test vehicles, and technical data. A critical design review was completed in September 1993. Six pre-production prototypes underwent technical testing in FY94–95. Early User Test and Experimentation was completed in June 1995 and was highlighted by a successful LVAD of a prototype AGS.

Live fire testing and initial operational test and evaluation were scheduled to be conducted in FY96. A full-rate production decision was scheduled for March 1997 (Milestone III).

=== Proposed revivals and exports ===
In 1998, the Senate Armed Services Committee proposed using the M8 AGS as a surrogate vehicle to evaluate "strike force experimentation activities" in the 2nd Cavalry Regiment.

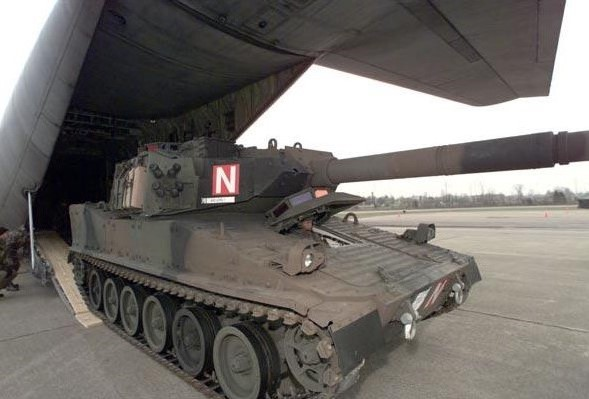
An M8 AGS rolls off a C-130 for a platform performance demonstration at Fort Knox c. December 1999.

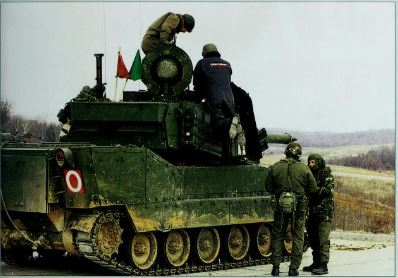
An M8 at the Fort Knox platform performance demonstration c. 2000 in the level II armor configuration

In October 1999, Army Chief of Staff Eric Shinseki laid out his vision for a lighter, more transportable force. The Army began the Interim Armored Vehicle (IAV) program to implement Shinseki's concept. United Defense LP (UDLP) proposed the AGS, as well as a version of the Mobile Tactical Vehicle Light, for the Mobile Gun System variant of the IAV in 2000. United Defense provided three AGSs oufitted with levels I, II and III armor for a platform performance demonstration from December 1999 to January 2000. One of these systems was equipped with improved forward-looking infrared. By then, the AGS had reached an advanced level of technological maturity, and thus UDLP said it could field its design almost two years earlier than the General Motors' LAV III proposal. The AGS lost out to the General Motors proposal, which was type classified as the Stryker M1128 mobile gun system. UDLP protested the award, alleging that the Army disregarded its own timeline requirements and that the requirements were unfairly biased for wheeled vehicles. The General Accounting Office denied UDLP's protest in April 2001.

In March 2004, at the 82nd Airborne Division's request, the Army approved the transfer of four production vehicles from United Defense's facility in Pennsylvania to Fort Bragg, North Carolina. The vehicles were intended to bolster the 82nd's 1st Squadron, 17th Cavalry, which was in need of greater firepower for an upcoming deployment to the recent war in Iraq. However, in June 2004, this plan was put on hold while the Army determined whether the Mobile Gun System (MGS) could meet the 82nd's requirements. An air-drop test of a Stryker weighted to simulate the load of the MGS was conducted in August. Around the same time, the Army identified issues with the airworthiness of the MGS, among the heavier of the Stryker family. Still more pervasive problems persisted with the autoloader. While this decision was on hold, Congressman Robin Hayes expressed frustration that the AGS had not been fielded, and called on the DoD to act swiftly to resolve the delay. In January 2005, the Army said it had ruled out fielding the AGS, saying the system lacked spare parts that would be required to maintain the vehicle for any significant length of time. The Army also doubled down on its commitment to fielding the MGS, which it said it could begin fielding in summer 2006.

United Defense sought overseas customers without success. In 1994 United Defense partnered with Rheinmetall to market the AGS to NATO allies. Taiwan was interested in acquiring as many as 700 of the system, which would be produced domestically. That year the U.S. State Department authorized the sale of just as many to Taiwan and United Defense agreed to co-production with Hwa Fong Industries conditional on the selection of the vehicle by Taiwan. United Defense manufactured a demonstrator vehicle which it shipped to Taiwan c. 1996. United Defense presented a version of the AGS without the autoloader. This was a cost-saving measure to allay Taiwan's concerns about the cost of the system. Many other countries expressed interest in the AGS. By 1998 these were: Canada, Germany (for 50 systems), Malaysia and Singapore. In 1996 FMC-Nurol and United Defense teamed to market the AGS to Turkey, which had a requirement for 200 systems. This bid was said to be a longshot as Turkey's requirement was for a main battle tank in the 50–60 short tons (45–54 t) range.

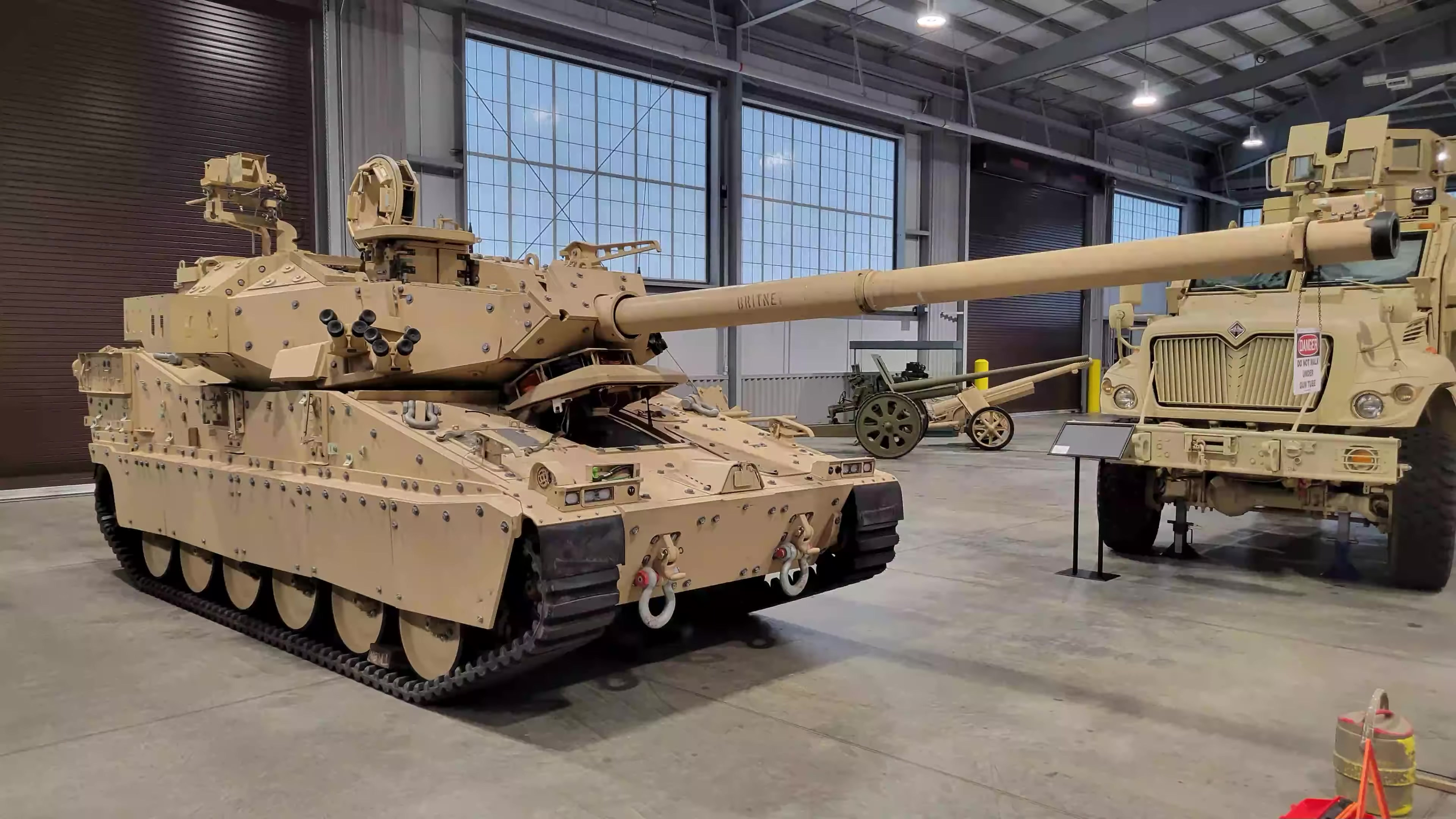
An XM1302 Mobile Protected Firepower (MPF) testbed at the U.S. Army Armor & Cavalry Collection at Fort Benning, Georgia, in 2023

An MPF testbed arrives at the U.S. Army Armor & Cavalry Collection in 2023.

In 2015, the U.S. Army articulated a requirement for a Mobile Protected Firepower system to replace the Mobile Gun System. In 2017, the Army formalized its requirements with a request for proposals. The MPF was defined as an air-transportable light tank to assist infantry brigades in forced entry operations. The Army sought to buy 504 MPF systems. Requirements called for a tracked vehicle armed with a 105 mm or 120 mm caliber cannon, which would not need to be air-droppable. BAE Systems (which bought United Defense in 2005) entered a modernized AGS into the MPF competition. In 2018, the Army selected bids from GDLS and BAE to build 12 prototypes each. BAE began delivering the prototype vehicles to the Army in December 2020, although the last of these were delivered behind schedule after testing had begun. The Army's evaluation of BAE and General Dynamics prototypes at Fort Bragg, North Carolina, continued through August. In February 2022, BAE was eliminated from the competition due to noncompliance issues, leaving the General Dynamics Griffin as the only remaining MPF entry. In June 2022, the Army selected the Griffin as the winner of the MPF competition. The GDLS Griffin was later type classified as the M10 Booker.

== Design ==
The AGS operational requirements were identified early in the process. In order, they were: deployability, lethality, survivability, and sustainability.

The basic hull of the AGS is made of welded 5083 aluminum alloy, with a modular armor system that allows the vehicle to be equipped according to requirements. Aluminum was chosen instead of steel in order to reduce the weight of the vehicle. The weight limit for the vehicle was driven by the requirement that it be capable of LVAD. (Note: The C-130 aircraft was the only U.S. tactical aircraft used for LVAD operations at the time. The C-141, C-17 and C-5, though capable of LVAD missions operate primarily in a strategic role. The C-130 can LVAD heavier loads than a C-141 without a waiver.)

Subcontractors as of 1996 consisted of Chrysler Corporation (Pentastar), Computing Devices Canada, Detroit Diesel, General Electric Company, General Motors Corporation (Hughes Electronics), Textron Inc.: (Cadillac Gage) and Watervliet Arsenal.

=== Protection ===
The CCVL hull was all-welded aluminum with bolt-on steel composite armor. Appliqué armor could also be installed by the user. This may have been Modular Expandable Armor System from IBD Deisenroth Engineering.

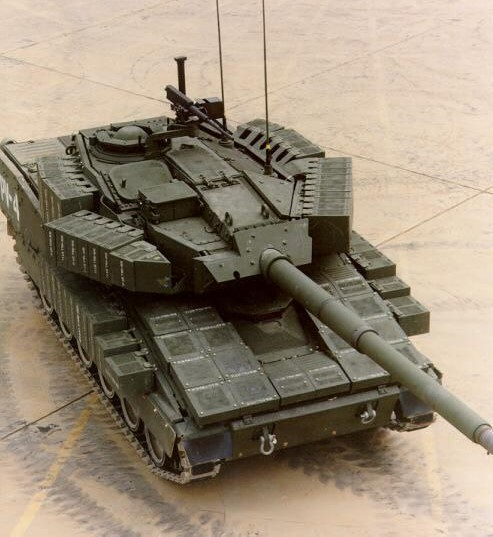
AGS PV-4 seen here with level III armor. Note the passive armor boxes. (Note: Pictures of the visual differences between the armor levels can be found in a work by R. P. Hunnicutt.) (Note: A similar-looking undated image of an AGS is described by Christopher F Foss as having level 2 armor and explosive reactive armor.)

The AGS was designed with three modular armor levels:

- The Level I (basic) armor package consisted of ceramic armor tiles and protected the vehicle against small-arms fire and shell splinters. All-around protection protection is provided against rounds up to 7.62 mm AP and protection against 14.5 mm rounds is provided over the frontal arc. It was designed for the rapid deployment role and could be airdropped from a C-130 cargo aircraft. All-up weight was 39,800 lb (18,100 kg).
- The Level II armor package consisted of additional plates of titanium, hardened steel and expanded metal. (Note: An illustration from an undated slide deck by FMC shows aluminum 7039 plates covering the sides of the chassis and the area behind the turret. High hard steel covers the tracks. High hard steel, perforated metal and aluminum 5083 covers the chassis rear.) All-around protection was increased to protection against 14.5 mm rounds and 30 mm rounds over the frontal arc. At an all-up weight of 44,270 lb (20,081 kg), Level II-armored AGS could still be carried by C-130 and C-141 cargo aircraft. but could not be air-dropped.
- Level III armor is mounted atop Level II armor, and consists of bolt-on armor boxes and is designed for contingency operations. It provides protection against light handheld anti-tank weapons such as rocket-propelled grenades over selected areas, and cannon rounds up to 30 mm. Level III-armored AGS systems cannot be transported by C-130. All-up weight is 52,000 lb (24,000 kg).

As of 2003 United Defense was evaluating combining level I and II armors.

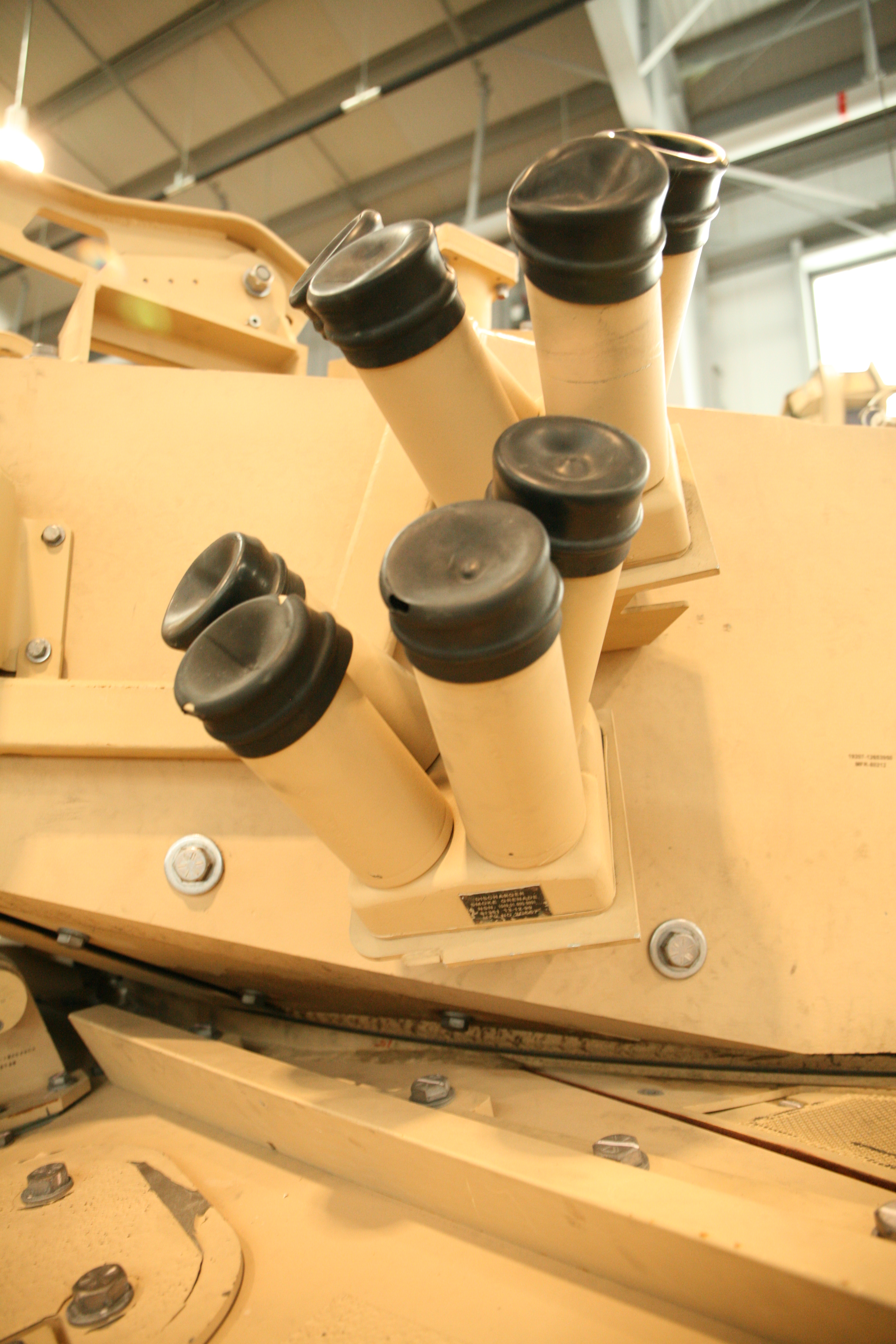
MPF M257 smoke grenade launchers

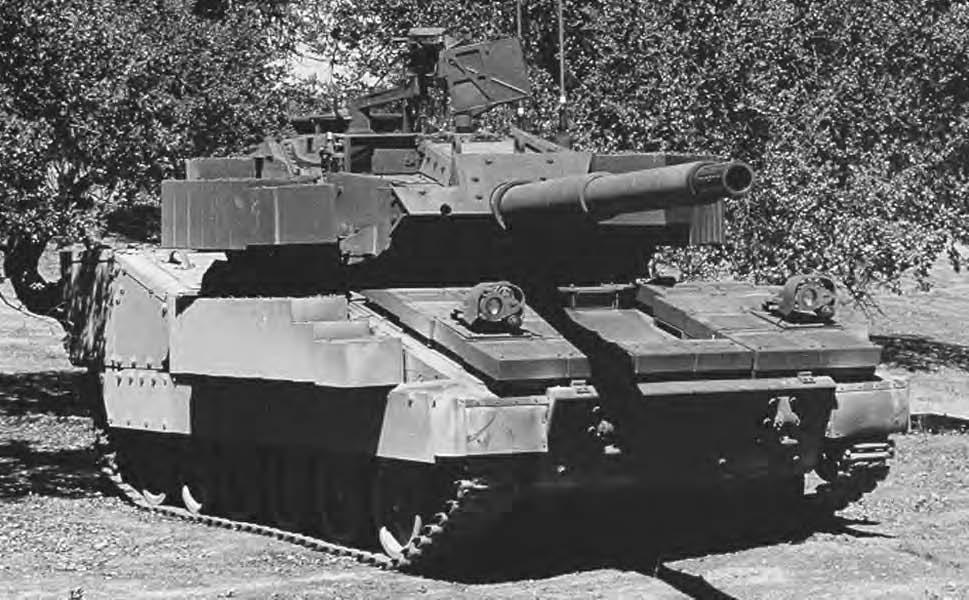
An AGS with level III armor

The crew is protected from ammunition explosion by blowout panels on the roof and a bulkhead separating the ammunition from the crew. The ammunition compartments in the hull are also protected by blowout panels. Explosion/fire suppression is provided by a Santa Barbara Dual Spectrum system. Halon fire-suppression protects the crew compartment while a powder system is installed in the engine compartment. Unlike the CCVL, the AGS crew is equipped with Nuclear Biological Chemical (NBC) overpressure system. Per the Army's requirement, this is accomplished with ventilated face pieces. NBC-sealing of the turret is not possible in any event as the vehicle is exposed to outside air when spent shell cases are ejected and when the main gun is fired in maximum depression. NBC protection is provided by filtered air through tubing to M25/M42 masks. The Army omitted a requirement for radiation hardening from the AGS.

The CCVL had two 16-barrel Tracor MBA Advanced Smoke Launcher System smoke grenade launchers mounted on either side of the turret. This fired L8 visual or M76 infrared obscurants. The AGS had two 8-barrel smoke grenade launchers which could fire a variety of obscurants. The MPF variant has two 8-barrel M257 model firing M19 smoke grenades.

The CCVL was protected from 30 mm kinetic-energy rounds over the frontal arc. The United Defense Mobile Gun System variant included 7.62 mm integral armor protection over most of the vehicle, and 14.5 mm AP protection over the frontal 60-degree arc. BAE equipped the Mobile Protected Firepower variant of the AGS with underbody blast protection from roadside bombs.

The MPF variant integrated a BAE's Raven soft kill active protection system. This comprised wide-angle view long-wave infrared cameras, radar, and a jammer. As of 2019, BAE was working on adding medium-wave infrared sensors and a slew-to-cue system that points the turret in the direction of the incoming missile. The latter would allow the crew to more quickly identify and engage the perpetrators.

=== Mobility ===
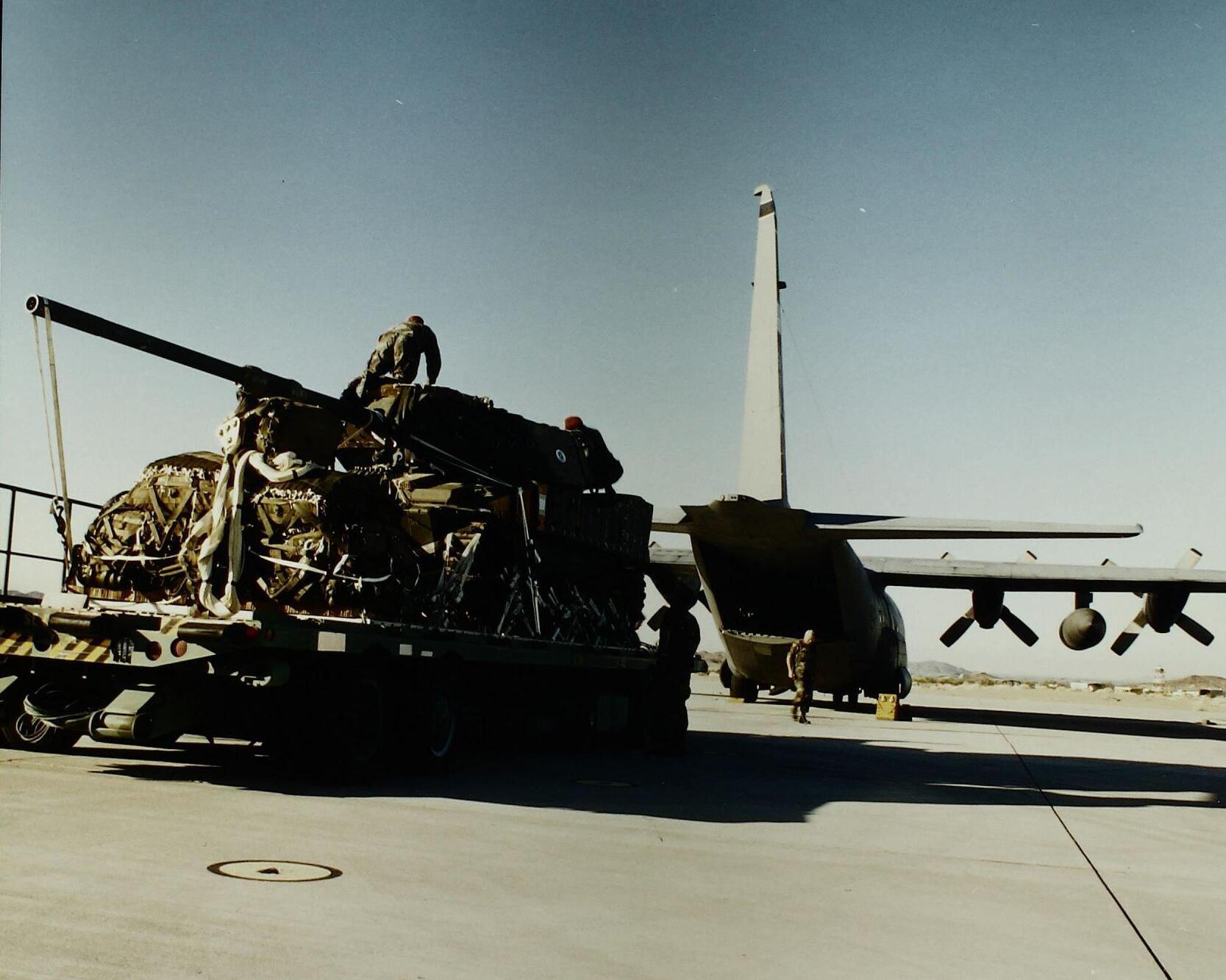
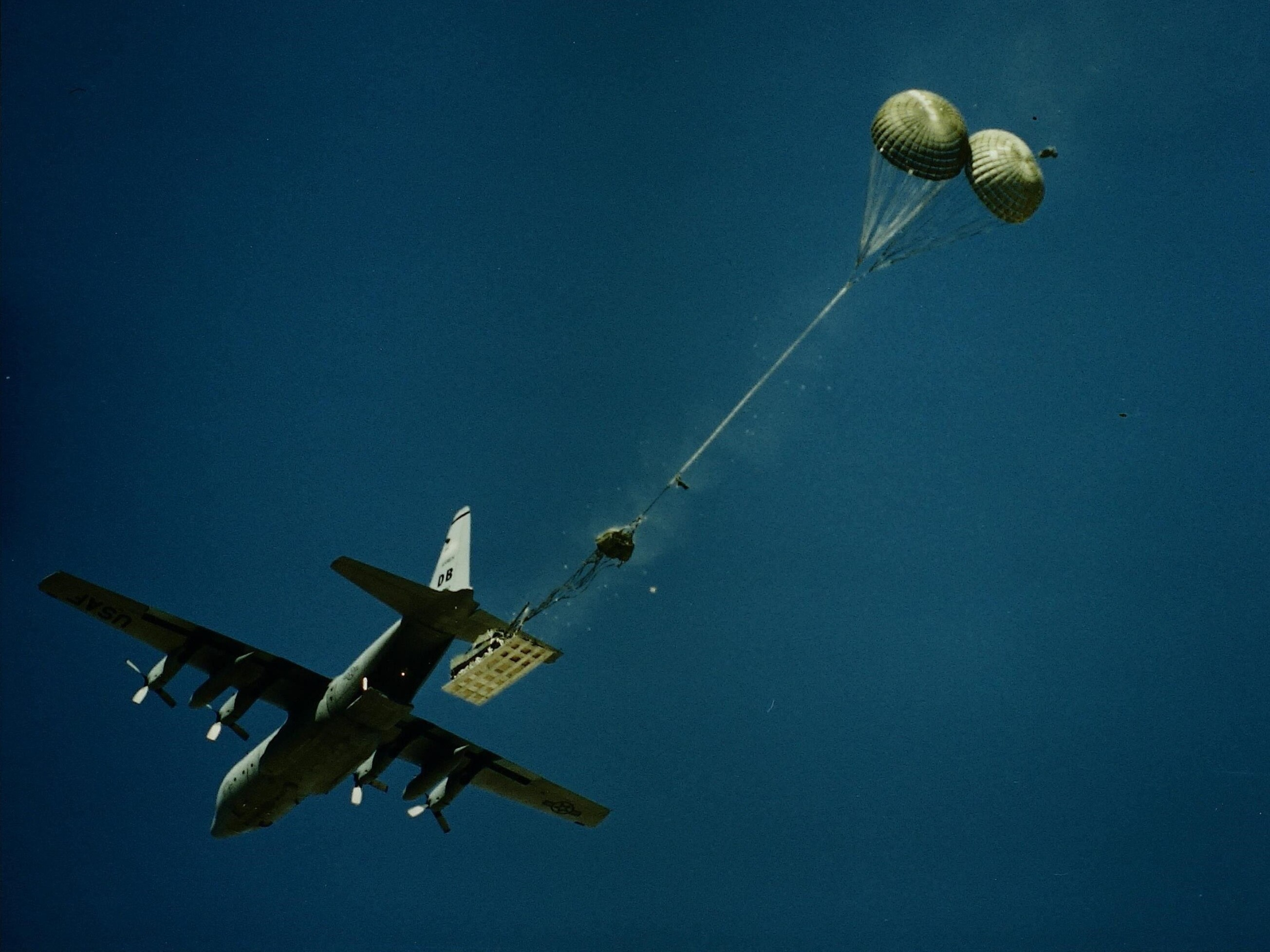
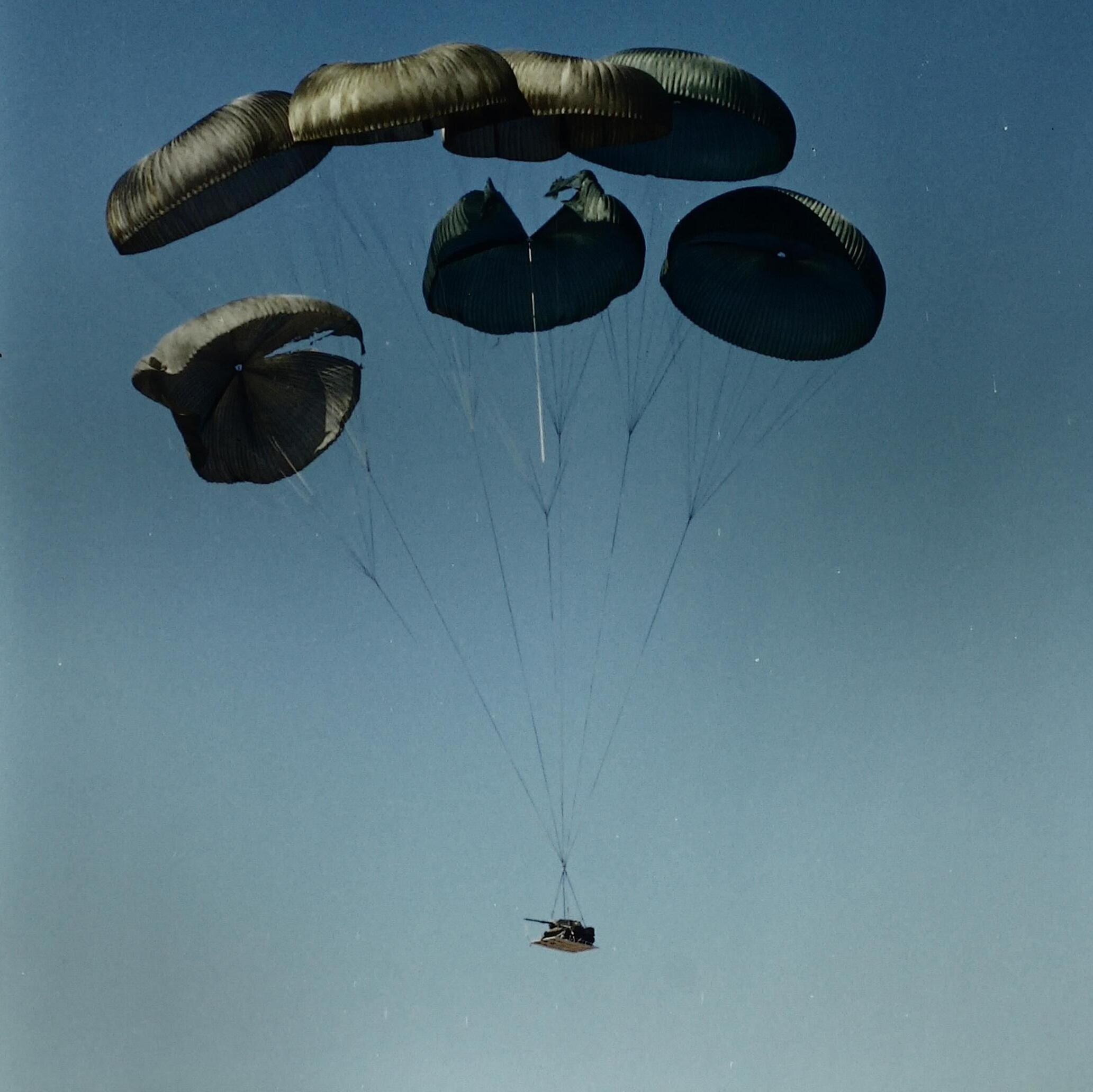
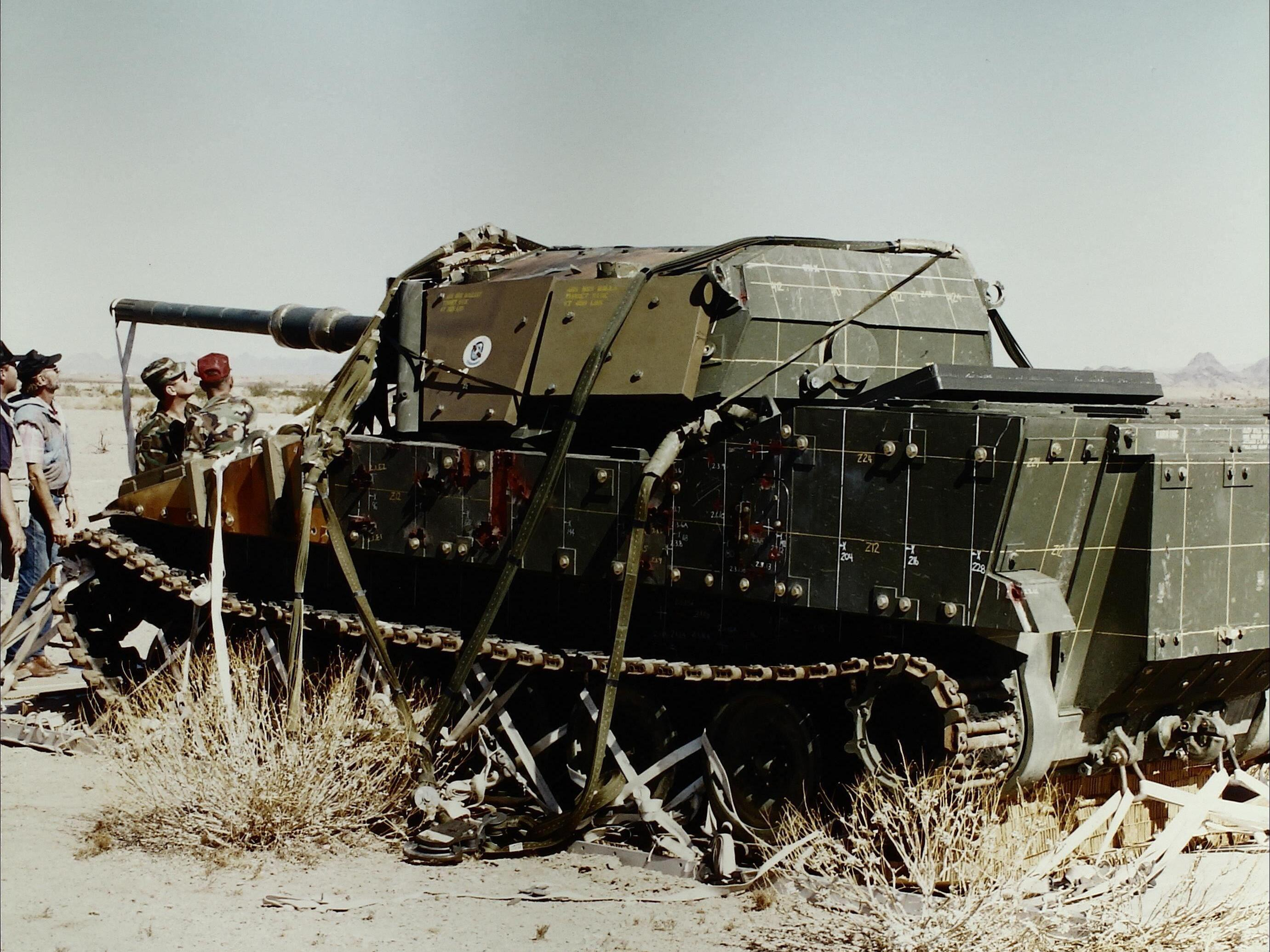
An XM8 is airdropped at Yuma Proving Ground in October 1994

Power is provided by a Detroit Diesel 6V-92TA 6-cylinder multifuel diesel engine developing 550 hp (410 kW) at 2,400 rpm with JP-8 fuel, and 580 hp (430 kW) at 2,400 rpm with DF2 diesel. (Note: According to MPF project manager LTC Peter George, JP-8 was expected to be used in general.) This had 65 percent commonality with the eight-cylinder version fitted on the Heavy Expanded Mobility Tactical Truck (HEMTT). The AGS's power-to-weight ratio was greater than the American M1A1 Abrams main battle tank. The top speed is governor-limited to 45 mph (72 km/h). The fuel capacity is 150 US gal (570 L; 120 imp gal), giving the AGS a projected range of 300 mi (480 km) at a cruising speed of 25 mph (40 km/h). The General Electric hydromechanical HMPT-500 transmission is also used by the Bradley Fighting Vehicle. The transmission has three forward speeds and one reverse.

Mounted on two tracks, the powerpack slides out for maintenance and can be run while it sits on the tracks at the rear of the vehicle. An auxiliary power unit was considered, but ultimately omitted from the final design to save weight. The M8's tracks are double-pin modified T150 with six inches of pitch.

The AGS torsion bar suspension is similar to that in the Abrams. The MPF's torsion bar suspension is in common with the Bradley and Armored Multi-Purpose Vehicle.

An MPF testbed with MTU engine visible idles at the U.S. Army Armor and Cavalry Collection in 2022

Many different engines, including a gas turbine, were considered for follow-on versions of the CCVL. The Detroit Diesel engine was replaced in the Mobile Protected Firepower variant with an MTU diesel engine, this one also developing 550 hp (410 kW). This was mated to an Allison 3040 MX transmission.

FMC designed the CCVL to be capable of LAPES (low-altitude parachute-extraction system) airdrop from a C-130. The Army required two variants of the AGS. One capable of the LVAD from the C-17 Globemaster III (intended for the 82nd Airborne), and a heavier variant with roll-on/roll-off capability from the C-5 Galaxy, C-17, C-141 Starlifter and C-130 Hercules. In 1990, the Army had demoted the requirement for LAPES from a required capability to a desired one. After winning the AGS contract, FMC further whittled down the weight of the AGS in order to make the tank light enough for LVAD from a C-130. The AGS was initially several hundred pounds over the weight limit for LVAD from a C-130. Initially weight savings was primarily achieved by reducing the weight of the pallets. Other changes included: changing the shape of the track, substituting titanium and graphite materials for the autoloader, using titanium hatches instead of aluminum or steel, and using a lighter alloy of steel and titanium for the road wheels. The Army tested three airdrops of the pallets with the simulated weight of an AGS. However as of January 1994, the Army was exploring meeting the weight requirements simply with changes to the AGS design.

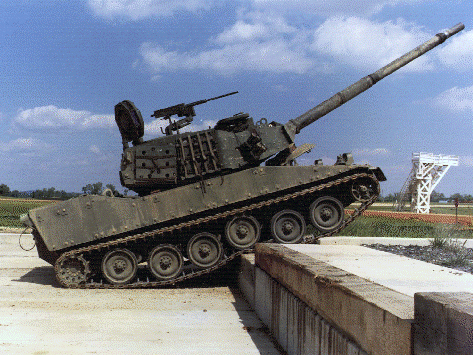
An M8 AGS climbs a vertical wall at a test track.

Level II and III armor packages can be airdropped separately from the AGS and installed in the field in under three hours. All versions are air-transportable by C-130, C-141, C-17 and C-5 (one, two, three and five systems respectively). For LVAD, the vehicle is stripped to a weight of no more than 17.8 short tons (16.1 t). The vehicle height is reduced by removing or retracting the commander's cupola. Up to 10 rounds of 105 mm ammunition can be carried in ready capacity. The MPF variant retained airlift capability: one could fit on the C-130 and three on the C-17.

A 1993 TRADOC study called for modifying 53 HEMTTs as Contingency Force Recovery Vehicles to assist with recovering the AGS. In 1994, the Army began seeking an assault bridge for the AGS. The service was seeking 18 medium assault bridge vehicles but hadn't been able to identify either an off-the-shelf solution or funding to develop one.

The M8 can carry approximately up to a squad of nine mounted infantry on top.

The MPF variant has a combat weight of 26 short tons (24 t).

=== Firepower ===
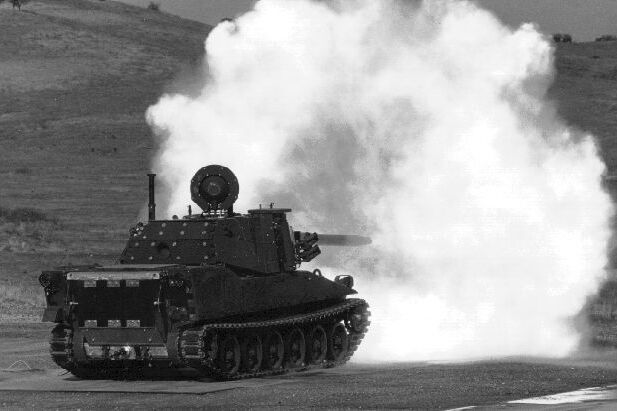
An XM8 preproduction model firing its gun c. September 1994

The AGS is armed with the Watervliet Arsenal M35 rifled autoloading 105 mm caliber soft-recoil tank gun with an M240 7.62 mm caliber machine gun mounted coaxially.

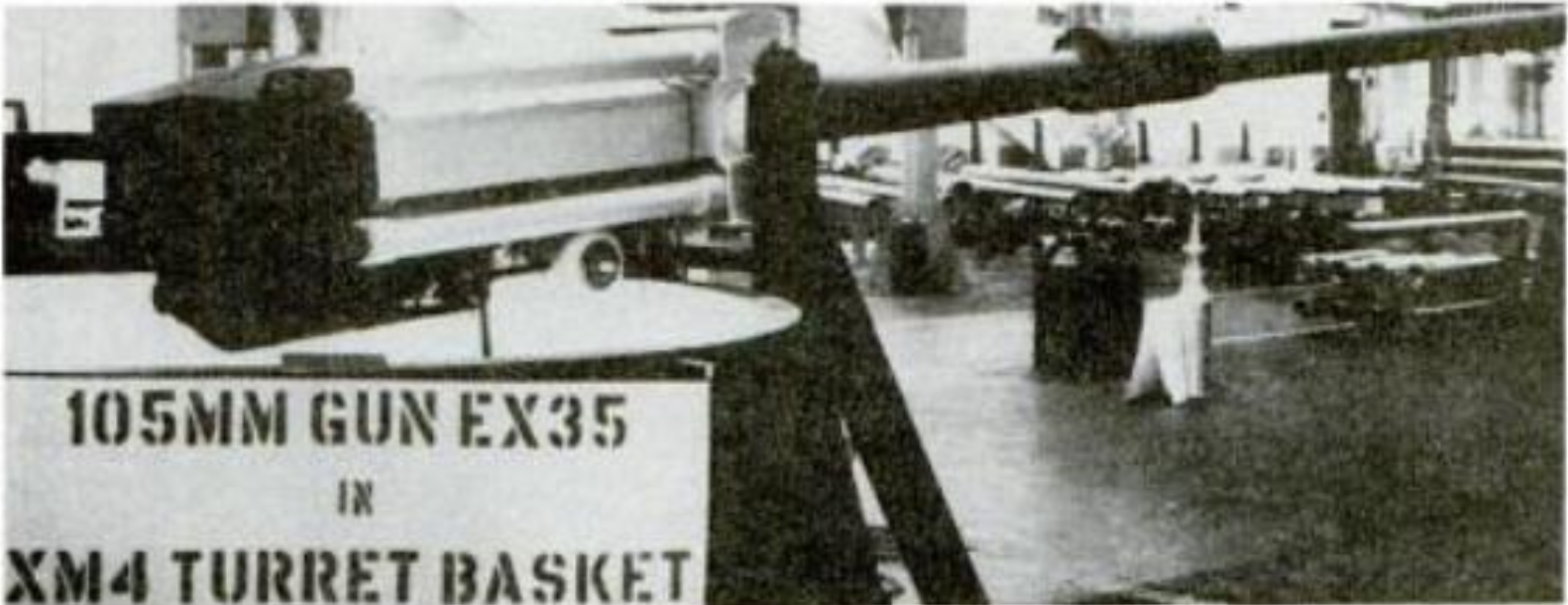
A prototype EX35 gun mounted in the FMC XM4 Armored Gun System (CCVL) turret basket c. 1984

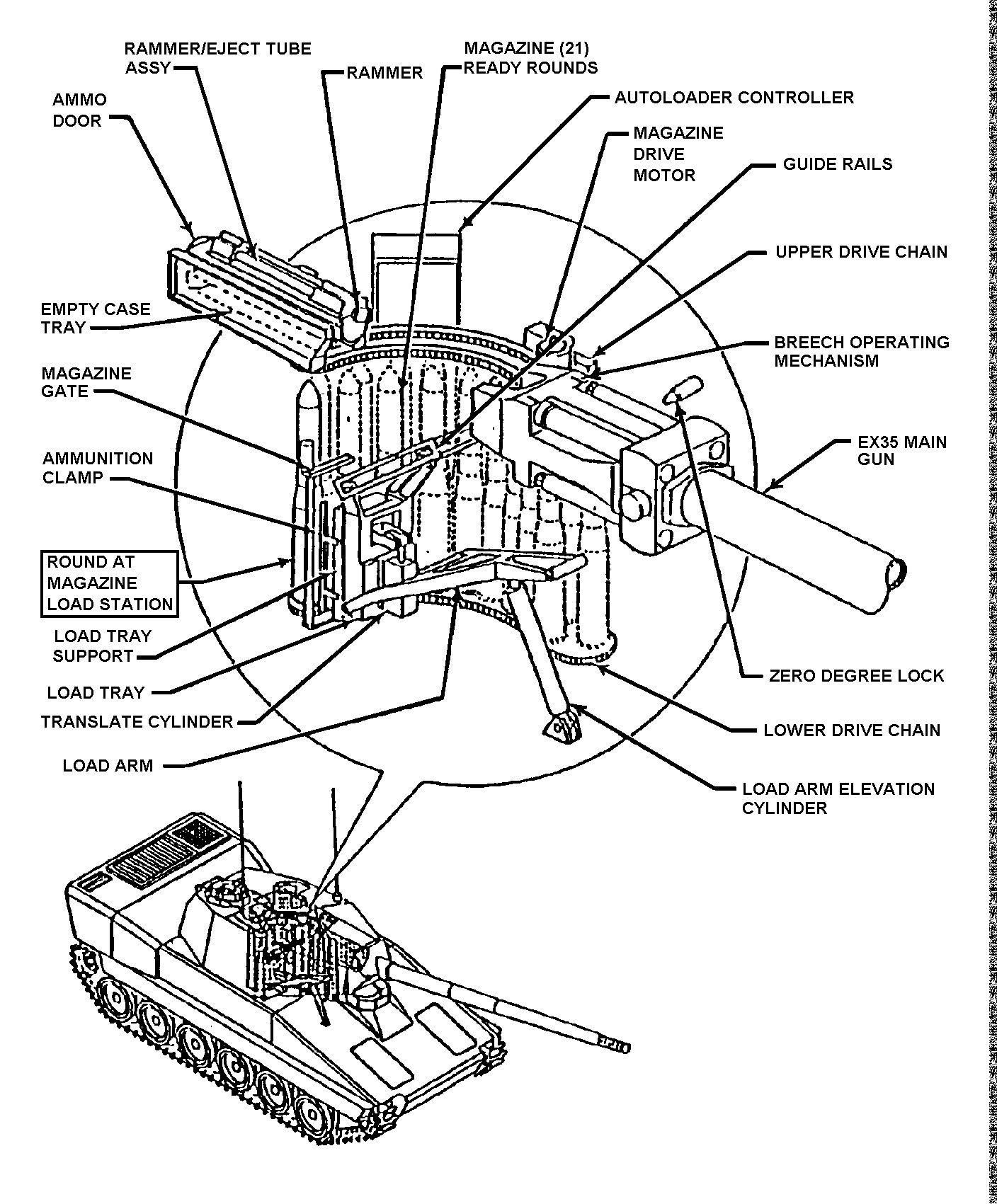
M8 AGS autoloader diagram

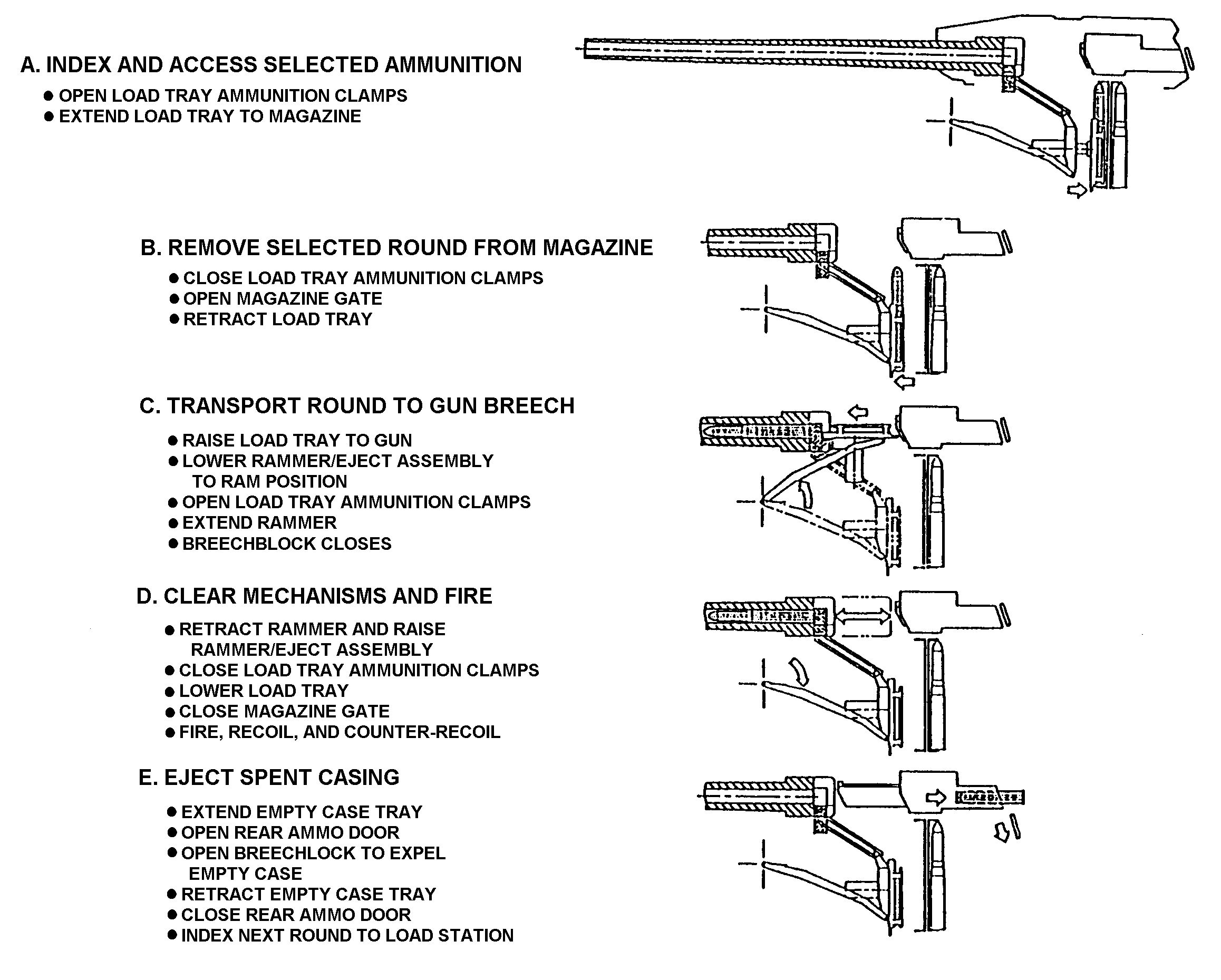
M8 AGS autoloader operation

The M35, known as the EX35 and XM35 during development, was originally designed and developed by Benét Laboratories, Watervliet Arsenal in 1983 for the Marine Corps Mobile Protected Gun Program. The M35 is about 1,800 lb (816 kg) lighter than the M68 used on the M60 tank.

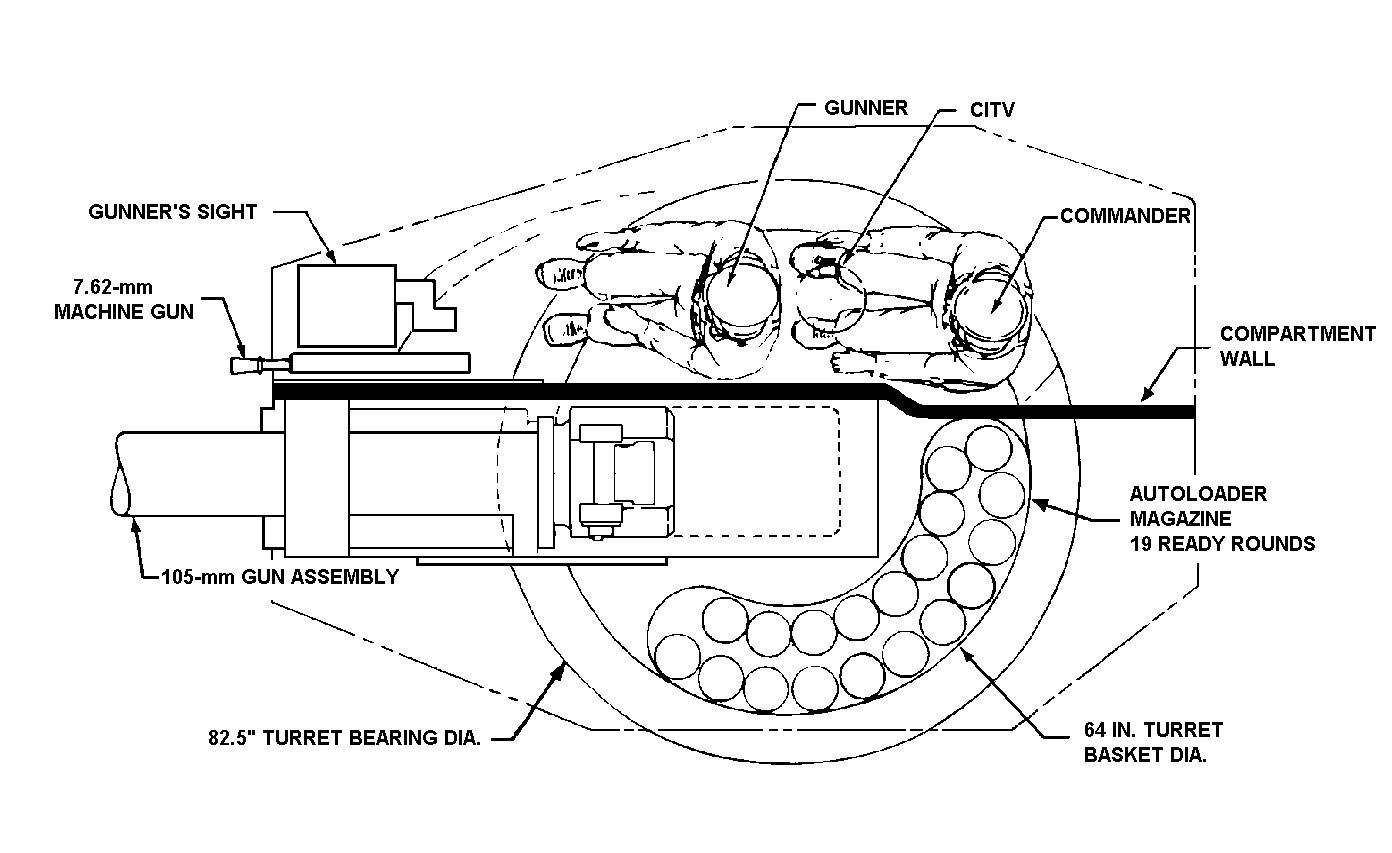
On the AGS, (CCVL pictured here) a compartment wall separates the commander and gunner from the autoloader magazine and the breech of the 105 mm main gun.

The M35 fires all NATO standard 105 mm ammunition in inventory. The M35 has a rate of fire of approximately 12 rounds per minute. The autoloader magazine has a ready capacity of 21 rounds. The M8 AGS holds nine more rounds in two hull storage compartments. (Note: According to Armor Project Manager Tank Main Armament Systems, "There are ways to get many more rounds on board or strapped to the outside, but there is a penalty in weight and survivability. Additional rounds could be added to the forward storage locations, and the autoloader itself, and hung on the outside in containers. These things could be done for certain missions if the tradeoffs are acceptable, but there are limits to ammunition stowage in a light tank.") The MPF also has 21 ready rounds and only seven rounds in hull storage.

The AGS has a laser rangefinder from the M1 Abrams, and the Computing Devices Canada Mission Management Computer System fire-control system is the same used in the Challenger 2. The nature of the gun's muzzle brake directed noise towards the tank, which could damage the crew's hearing; particularly the tank's commander. This problem was still being worked on as of 1995. Prototype versions of the AGS gun had a pepperpot muzzle brake which was anticipated would be deleted in the production version.

The gun is stabilized with a Cadillac Gage two-axis system. Gun depression and traverse are hydraulic, with a manual back up for emergencies. Depression and elevation is −10 degrees, except over a rear 60-degree arc, where it is limited to 0 degrees.

The CCVL was originally armed with Rheinmetall's soft-recoil version of the M68A1. It held 19 ready rounds, plus 24 in hull storage.

The autoloader was designed by FMC's Naval Systems Division. It is fed by a rotating 21-round magazine. The gunner selects the type of ammunition to be fired and the computer rotates the magazine to select the correct round accordingly. Automatic and single-shot modes are available. After firing, the gun returns to zero degrees elevation. The autoloader extracts the spent shell casing from the breech, then ejects the casing out of the turret through the same port used to load the autoloader. Once the autoloader has loaded the next round, the gun returns to the elevation of the last target. The autoloader will not engage if the door between the tank commander and the autoloader is open. If the autoloader is disabled, provisions exist for the crew to load the AGS under armor from the gunner's position. (Note: Should one crew member be lost, the remaining crew member in the turret can still fight the vehicle via manual loading from the gunner's position.) A program requirement existed that the crew was able to do this at three rounds per minute. In practice, the crew was only able to load the tank manually at about one round per minute as of 1994.

The gunner Hughes day/night thermal sight was stabilized. The CCVL had a commander's independent thermal viewer, but this was later eliminated to save weight.

The M35 fires all NATO-standard 105 mm caliber ammunition. The AGS can defeat 75 to 80 percent of tanks it may encounter on the battlefield. The AGS has the potential to engage main battle tanks, but these more heavily armored vehicles are less likely to be the AGS's main targets. The planned targets for the AGS ranged from bunkers and other artificial structures to armored personnel carriers and light armored vehicles.

On the AGS, a Browning M2 12.7 mm (.50) caliber heavy machine gun is mounted in a fully traversable ring-style mount on the commander's hatch. (Note: Originally a non-traversable pintle mount, this was changed to a 360° traversable design in 1992. This necessitated a redesign of the hatch.) Unlike in the M1A1, the M8 tank commander must expose himself through the hatch to operate the machine gun. Other possible weapons were a M240 7.62 mm caliber machine gun or an MK 19 40 mm grenade launcher. The CCVL has no commander's machine gun.

The coaxial M240 7.62 mm caliber machine gun on the CCVL has 1,600 ready rounds with 3,400 carried in reserve. On the AGS this weapon has 1,000 ready rounds and 3,500 carried in reserve. On the MPF, the coaxial 7.62 mm caliber machine gun has 1,000 ready rounds.

=== Human factors engineering ===
The AGS has an autoloader rather than a human loader. This means the AGS has a crew of three rather than four. In addition to loading the tank gun, a loader has other responsibilities that would need to be taken on by the three crew members and dismounted infantry.

=== Miscellaneous ===
FM 17-18 Light Armor Operations

The AGS has a 1553 data bus. This is not present in the CCVL. The AGS is equipped with an infantry phone.

There are separate hatches for the tank commander, gunner, and driver.

The MPF variant has four blind spot cameras for situational awareness. These could see in the long infrared range, which was integrated with the Raven soft kill system, but BAE eventually planned to add sensors for the medium-wave infrared spectrum.

=== Comparison of tanks ===
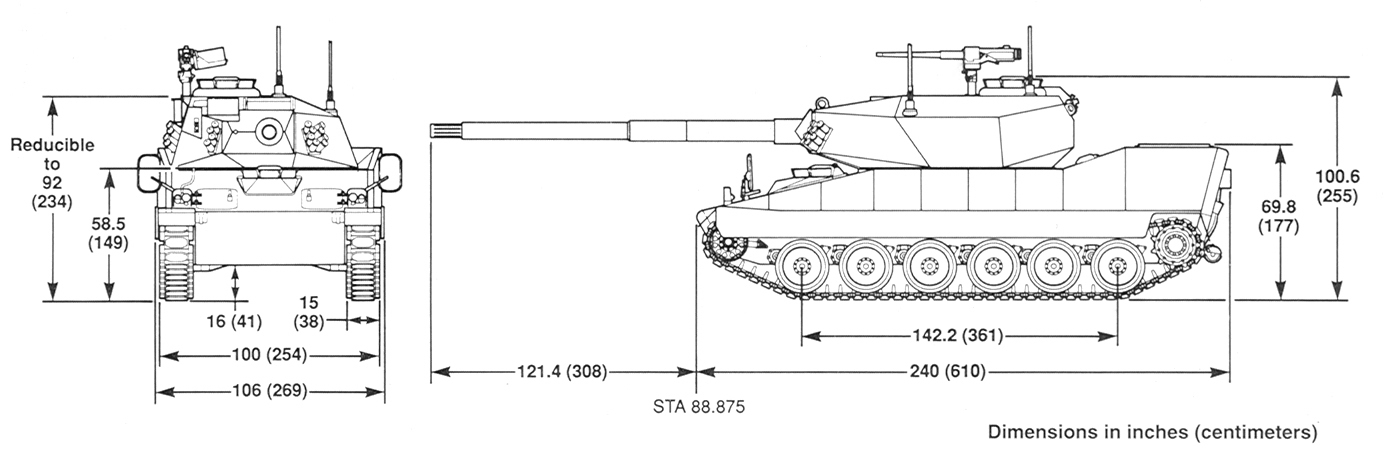
AGS dimensions

	CCVL	M8 AGS	XM1302 MPF	Vickers/FMC Mk 5	M551A1 Sheridan (TTS)	M1A1 Abrams
Hull Length	244 in (6.20 m)	242 to 247 in (6.15 to 6.27 m)	N/A	244 in (6.2 m)	248 in (6.30 m)	312 in (7.92 m)
Width	106 in (2.69 m)	104 in (2.64 m) (over fenders)	N/A	106 in (2.69 m)	110 in (2.79 m)	144 in (3.66 m)
Height	92 in (2.35 m) (turret roof)	100 to 101 in (2.54 to 2.57 m) (over cupola)	N/A	103 in (2.62 m) (overall)	116 in (2.95 m) (over MG)	114 in (2.90 m) (over MG)
Ground Clearance	16 in (0.41 m)	15 to 17 in (0.38 to 0.43 m)	N/A	16 in (0.41 m)	19 in (0.48 m)	
Top Speed	43 mph (70 km/h)	45 mph (72 km/h)	N/A	43 mph (70 km/h)	43 mph (69 km/h)	41.5 mph (67 km/h)
Fording	52 in (1.32 m)	40 in (1.0 m)	N/A	39 in (1.0 m)	Floats	48 in (1.2 m) (w/o kit)
Max Grade	60 percent		N/A	60 percent		
Max Trench	7 ft (2.13 m)	7 ft (2.1 m)	N/A	7 ft (2.13 m)	8 ft (2.4 m)	9 ft (2.7 m)
Max Wall	30 in (0.76 m)	32 in (0.81 m)	N/A	30 in (0.76 m)	33 in (0.84 m)	49 in (1.24 m)
Range	300 mi (480 km)		N/A	300 mi (480 km)	350 mi (560 km)	289 mi (465 km)
Power	575 hp (429 kW) at 2400 rpm	550 hp (410 kW) at 2400 rpm (JP-8)	550 hp (410 kW)	552 hp (412 kW) at 2300 rpm	300 hp (220 kW) at 2800 rpm	1,500 hp (1,100 kW) at 3000 rpm
Power-to-Weight Ratio	24.2 hp/ST (26.7 hp/t)	28.3 to 21.2 hp/ST (23.3 to 17.4 kW/t)	N/A	25.4 hp/ST (28 hp/t)	17.9 hp/ST (14.7 kW/t)	23.1 hp/ST (19.0 kW/t)
Torque	N/A	1,446 lb⋅ft (1,960 N⋅m) at 1500 rpm	N/A		615 lb⋅ft (830 N⋅m) at 2100 rpm	3,934 lb⋅ft (5,330 N⋅m) at 1000 rpm
Weight, Combat Loaded	42,801 lb (19,414 kg)	36,900 to 52,000 lb (16,740 to 23,590 kg)	52,000 lb (23,590 kg)	43,541 lb (19,750 kg)	33,600 lb (15,240 kg)	130,000 lb (58,970 kg)
Ground Pressure	9.8 psi (0.69 kg/cm^{2})	9.1 to 12.2 psi (0.64 to 0.86 kg/cm^{2})	N/A	9.8 psi (0.69 kg/cm^{2})	6.9 psi (0.49 kg/cm^{2})	14.4 psi (1.01 kg/cm^{2})
Main Armament	M68A1 105 mm gun	M35 105 mm rifled		105 mm low recoil force gun	M81E1 rifled 152 mm gun/launcher	M256 120 mm smoothbore
Elevation	+20° / −10° (limited depression over rear arc)		N/A	+20° / −10° (limited depression over rear arc)	+19.5° / −8°	+20° / −10°
Traverse Rate	N/A	8.5 seconds/360°	N/A	9 seconds/360°	10 seconds/360°	9 seconds/360°
Elevation Rate	N/A	11°/second	N/A		4°/second	25°/second
Main Gun Ammo	43 (19 ready)	30 (21 ready)	28 (21 ready)	41 (19 ready)	29 (including 9 missiles)	40
Firing Rate	12rds/minute		N/A		4rds/minute	6rds/minute
Crew	3 (commander, gunner, driver)			4 (commander, gunner, loader, driver)		
Protection	All-welded aluminum hull and turret with bolt-on steel composite armor	5083 aluminum alloy hull and turret with ceramic tile	N/A	Aluminum hull and turret with applique steel plates	7039 aluminum alloy hull, rolled homogeneous steel turret	Rolled homogenous steel, with armor arrays in the turret and hull

== Variants ==
Close combat vehicle light

Using a magnet to determine which components of the CCVL are ferrous

FMC began developing the CCVL as a private venture in 1983. The first prototype CCVL was completed in August 1985 and debuted at the meeting of the Association of the United States Army in October.

M8 armored gun system/Buford (Note: An early mention of the "Buford" name appears in a speculative fictional account of the 2nd ACR in the 1994 Tom Clancy book Armored Cav: A Guided Tour of an Armored Cavalry Regiment, where it is said that the M8 is named after U.S. Army Civil War cavalry officer John Buford.)

The AGS eliminated the commander's independent thermal viewer of the CCVL. The Watervliet Arsenal M35 replaced the M68A1 gun. Six prototypes were produced, with a seventh vehicle under construction at the time of cancelation for demonstration to potential foreign buyers.

The Vickers/FMC Mark 5

Vickers/FMC Mark 5 battle tank (VFM 5)

In 1985 the British Vickers Defence Systems and FMC collaborated on a derivative of the CCVL intended for export customers. The prototype was completed in May 1986 and first publicly appeared later that year. The tank had a fourth crewmember in lieu of an autoloader. It was armed with a 105 mm low recoil force gun, and could accept a number of other 105 mm guns as well.

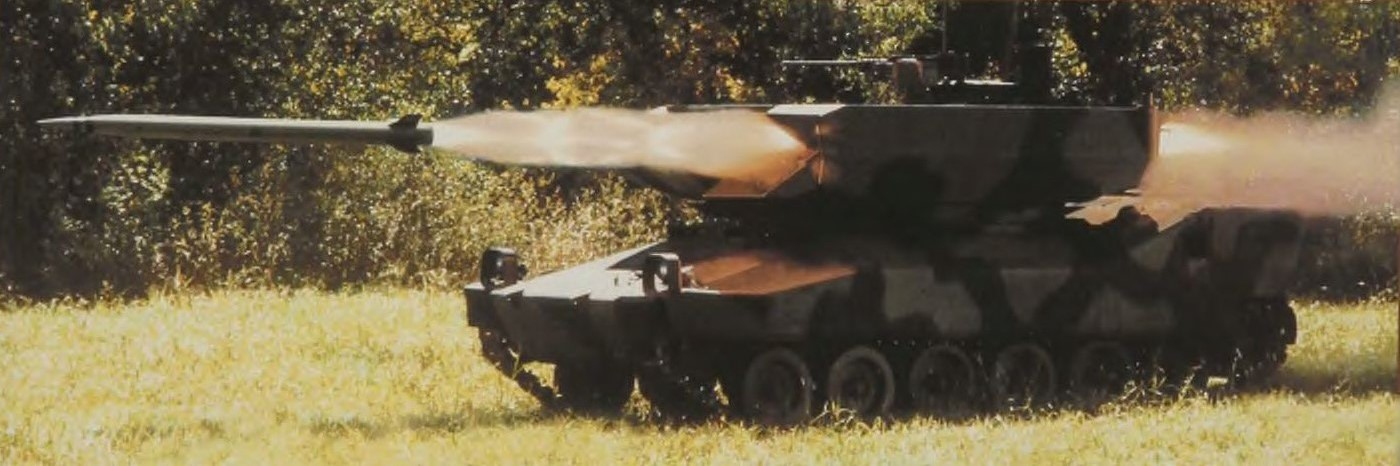
An artist's impression of a LOSAT system firing from an AGS chassis

Line of Sight Anti-Tank (LOSAT)

In 1994, Loral Vought Systems was awarded a contract worth up to $42.5 million ($92.3 million in 2025) to integrate the LOSAT missile onto an AGS chassis. In lieu of the turret, a missile pod with 12 kinetic energy missiles was installed. At least one full-scale mockup of the AGS LOSAT had been constructed by 1995. Delivery of the AGS LOSAT was scheduled for 1996. After the cancelation of the AGS, the Army switched the chassis of the LOSAT to the Humvee.

Austere export variant.

One demonstrator produced in 1995 by United Defense for evaluation by Taiwan.

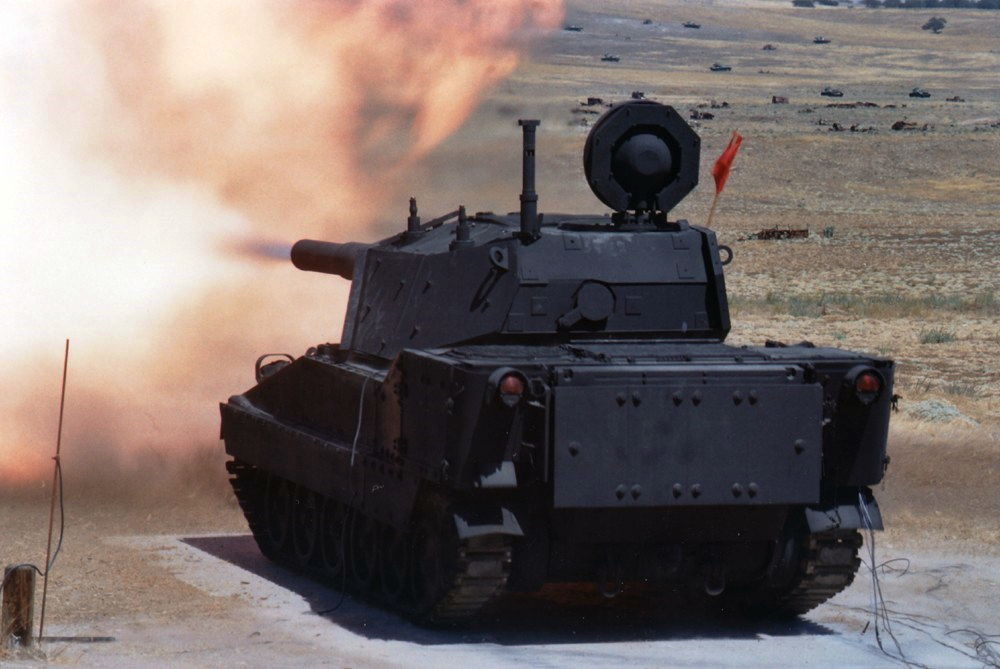
An AGS with level II armor fires its 120 mm main gun. Note the presence of track skirts.

M8 Enhanced Capabilities Demonstrator/Thunderbolt

A single technology demonstrator was built by United Defense and demonstrated in 2003. The ECD had a hybrid electric drive instead of a diesel engine. The tracks were a rubber band type. Armament was an XM291 120 mm electrothermal-chemical smoothbore cannon fitted with an autoloader. A storage area in the rear could be used to carry up to four crew members or other equipment, such as additional ammunition.

Lightning Bolt

In August 2004, BAE conducted live fire testing of the Lightning Bolt at Camp Roberts, California. Like the ECD, the Lightning Bolt incorporated a hybrid electric drive and XM291.

Singapore design study

In 2004, United Defense and Singapore studied using the AGS to meet the country's requirement for a replacement for its AMX-13 SM1 light tanks. In addition to a Thunderbolt-derived AGS variant, United Defense submitted a number of designs that mounted the Thunderbolt AGS's 120 mm cannon/turret (and alternatively, 105 mm) on a variety of chassis. These chassis were the Bionix IFV and the Universal Combat Vehicle Platform that the Primus self-propelled howitzer was based on.

120 armored gun system

BAE Systems debuted the AGS 120 in 2006. The chassis was based on the original M8 AGS but integrated the 120 mm gun and turret of the ECD/Thunderbolt.

External media

Images
- Photos of the BAE Mobile Protected Firepower prototype
- An M8 armored gun system awaiting restoration at the Museum Support Center at Anniston

Video
- Clip of MPF firing

Expeditionary Light Tank

BAE displayed this demonstrator at AUSA 2015. Improvements included rubber band tracks and better sensors such as 360-degree cameras and thermal imagers.

Mobile Protected Firepower demonstrator

BAE Systems showed this vehicle at AUSA Global Force in 2019. This demonstrator integrated IMI Systems Iron Fist hard kill and BAE Raven soft kill active protection systems and Saab Barracuda camouflage netting. The tracks were Soucy composite rubber and the engine was hybrid electric. Four longwave infrared cameras provided 360 degrees of view from the vehicle.

XM1302 Mobile Protected Firepower

BAE Systems entered an updated variant of the M8 in the U.S. Army XM1302 Mobile Protected Firepower program. According to BAE, the MPF variant is completely redesigned, keeping only the footprint (length, width and height). The MPF incorporates a new transmission and MTU powerpack, band composite rubber track, and a new fire-control system. BAE added improved underbody armor, as well as the Iron Fist active protection system and BAE's Terra Raven soft-kill system.

== Surviving examples ==
As of 2015, all six XM8s exist in various states of repair. An XM8 used for drop-testing is outside the U.S. Army Armor and Cavalry Collection at Fort Benning, Georgia, awaiting restoration as of 2022.

An M8 AGS on loan from the U.S. Army is on display at the Michigan Military Technical and Historical Society in Eastpointe, Michigan.

== Gallery ==
The Close Combat Vehicle Light at the National Museum of Military Vehicles in 2020.

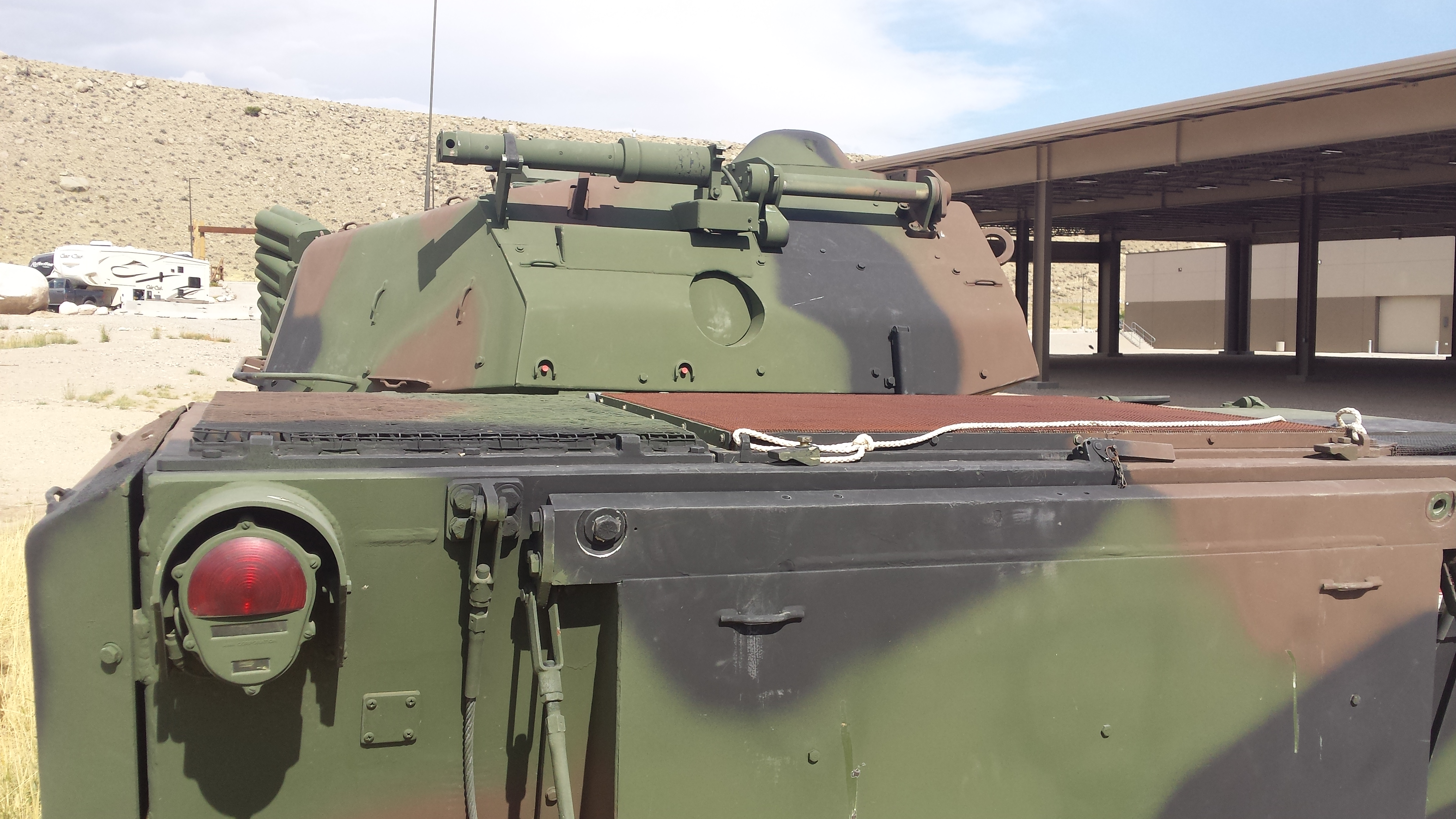
Rear

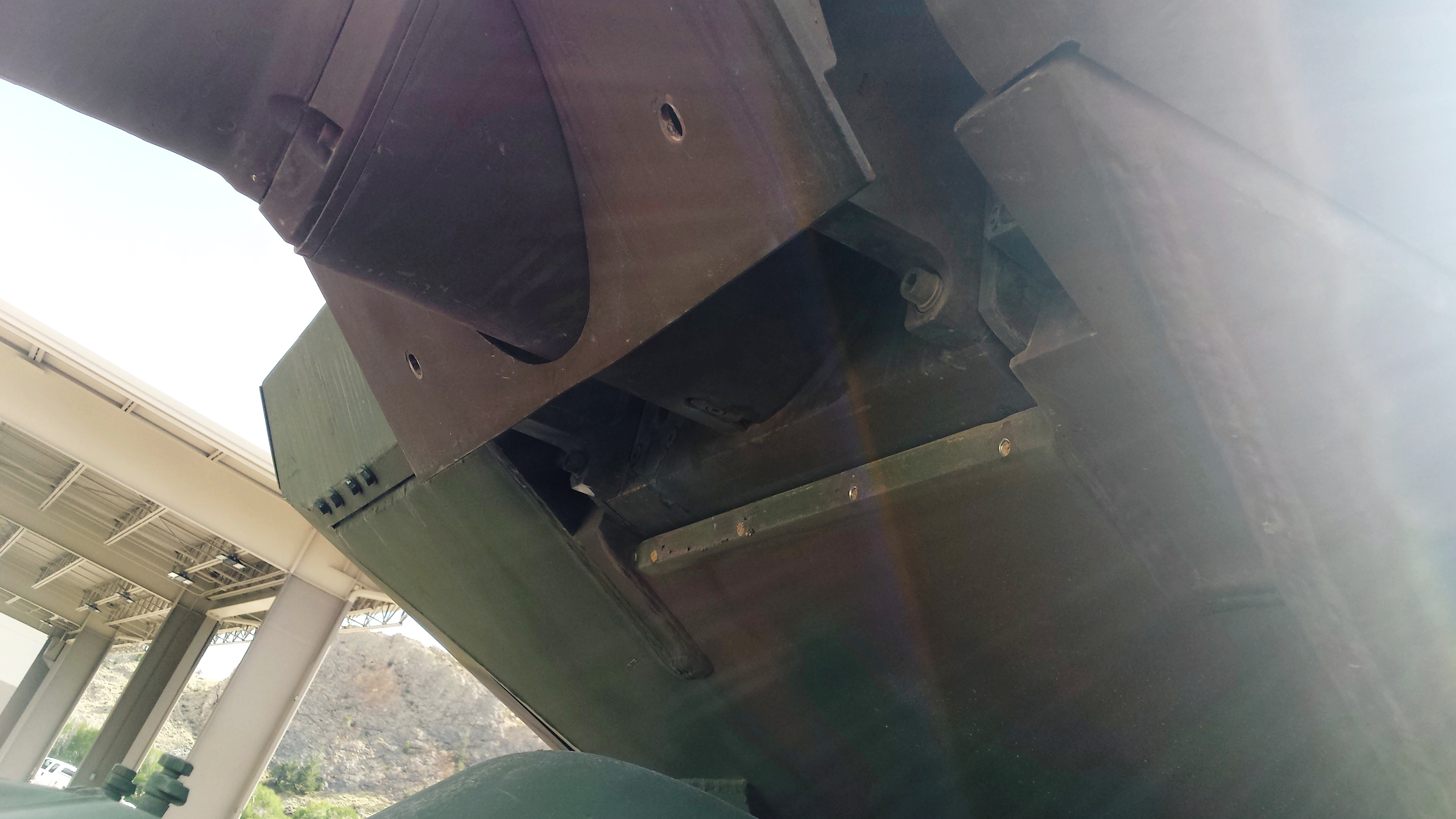
Gun mantlet

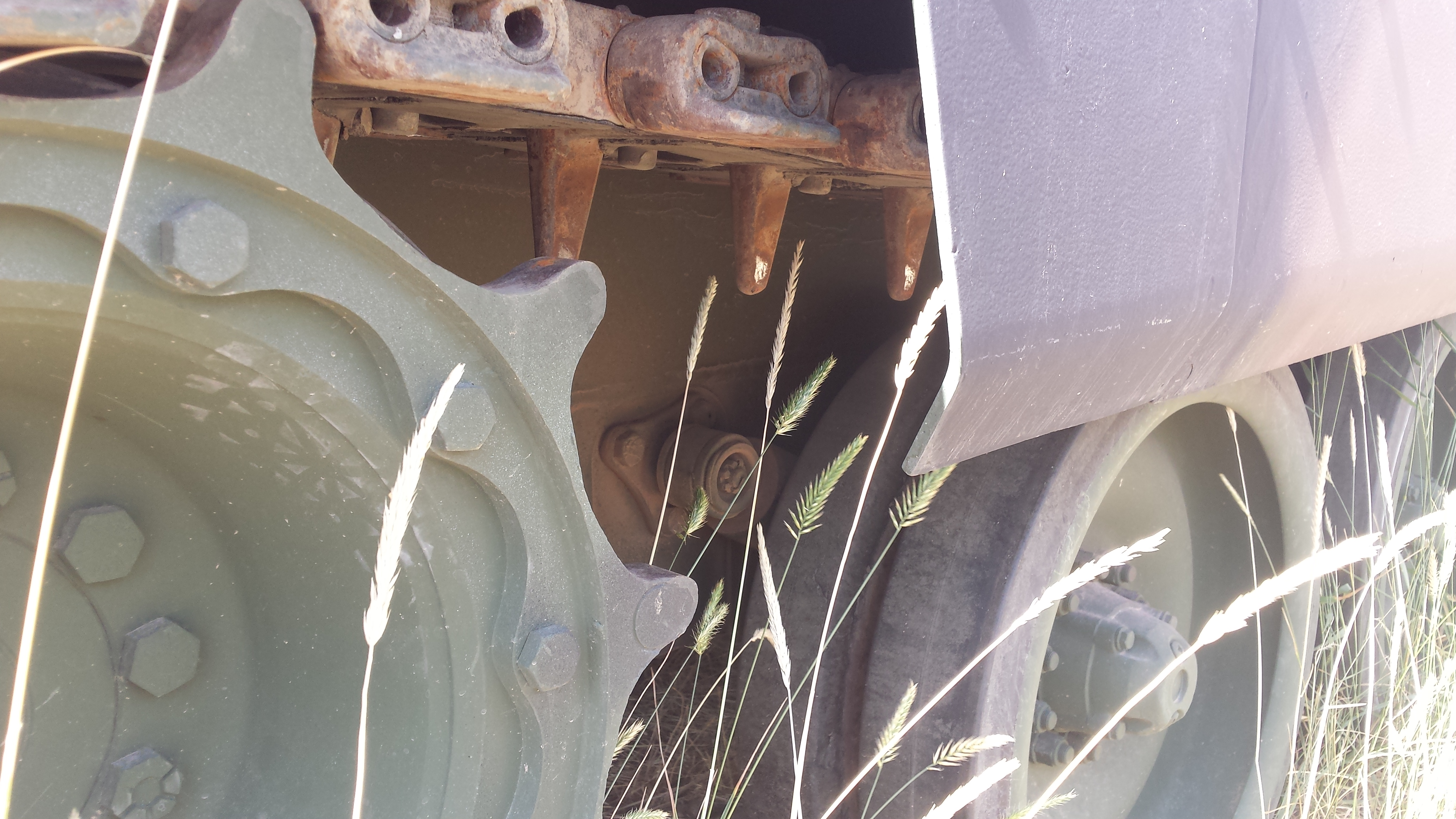
Roadwheels

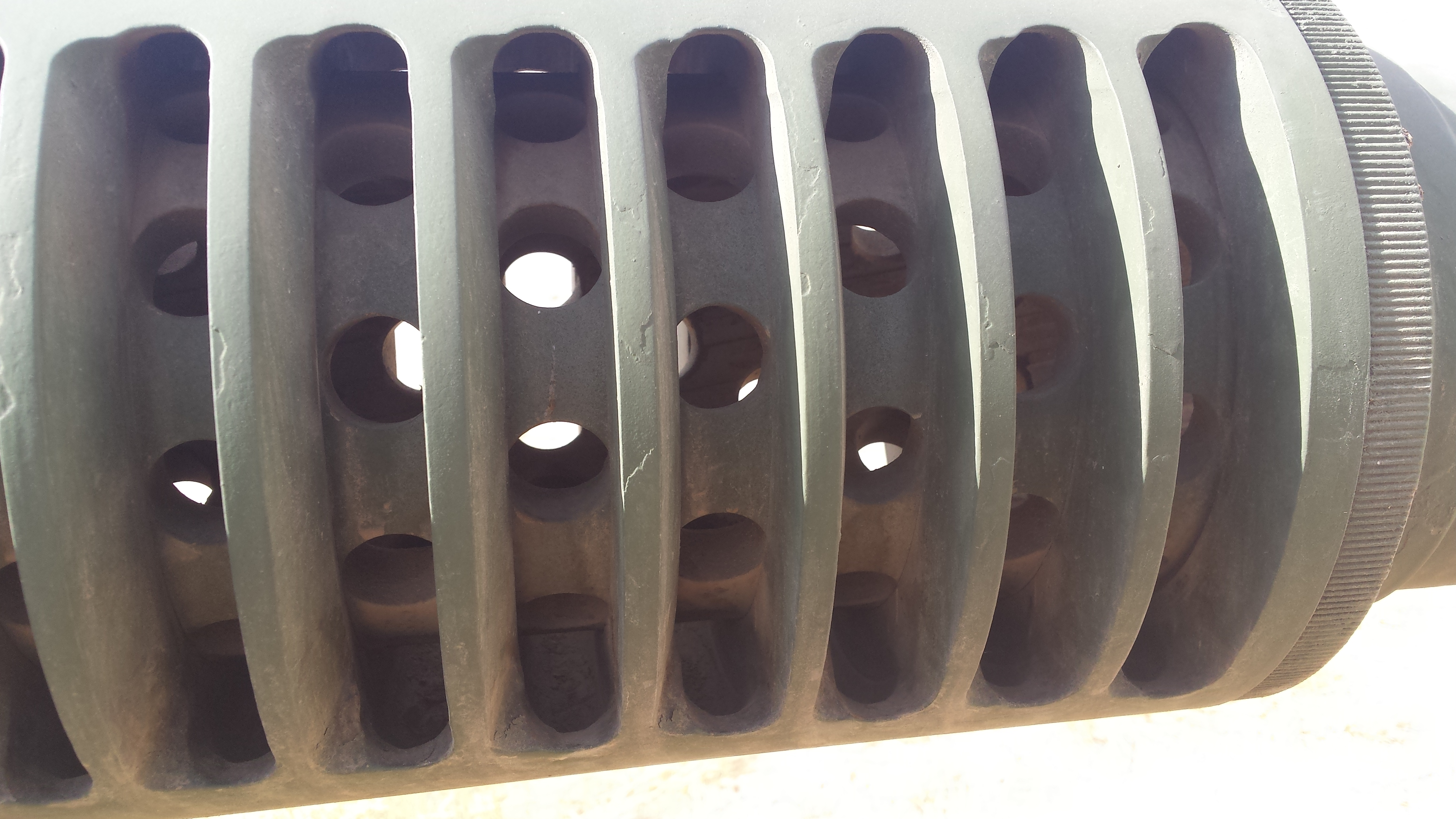
Pepperpot muzzle brake

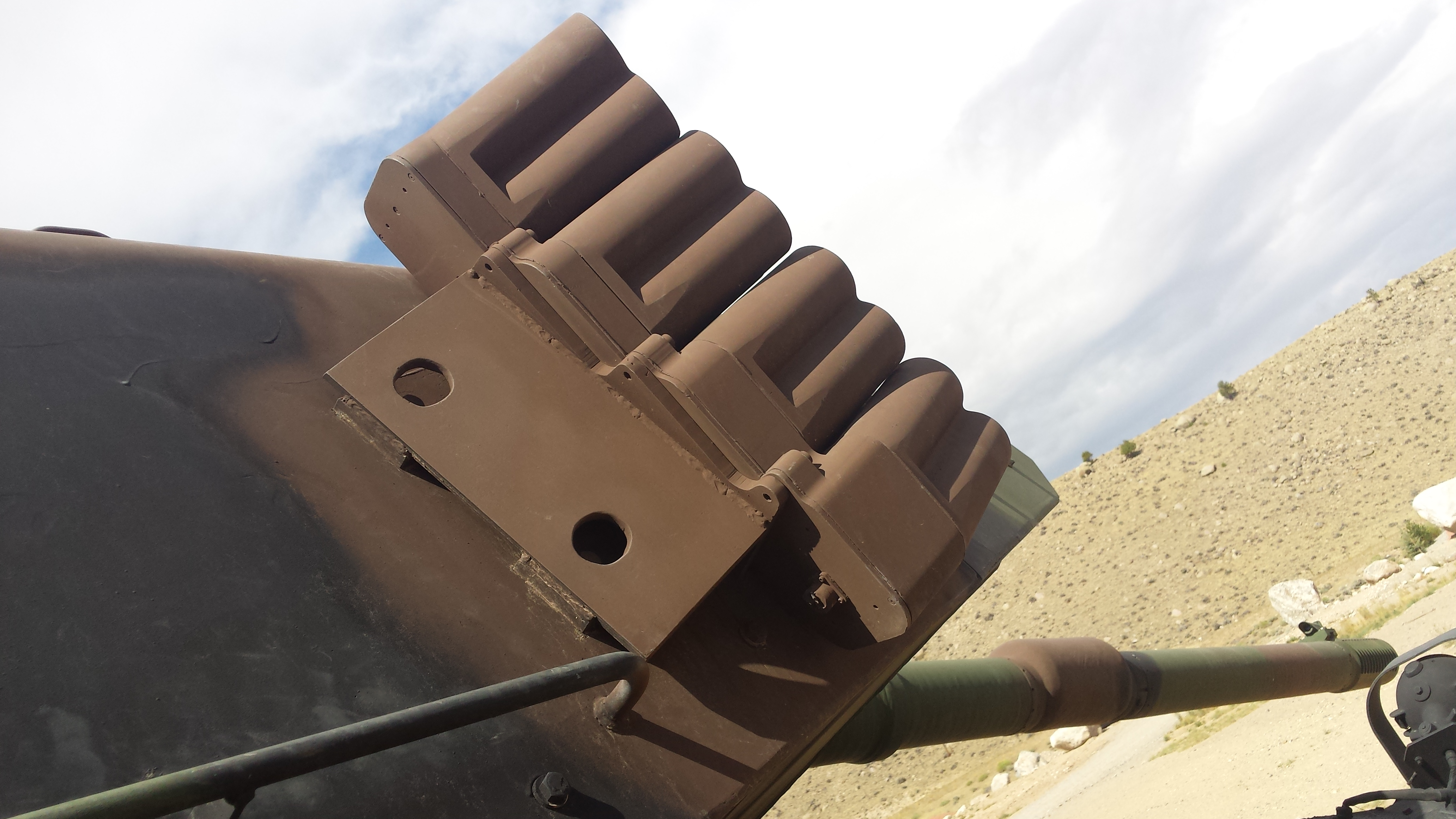
Smoke grenade launcher

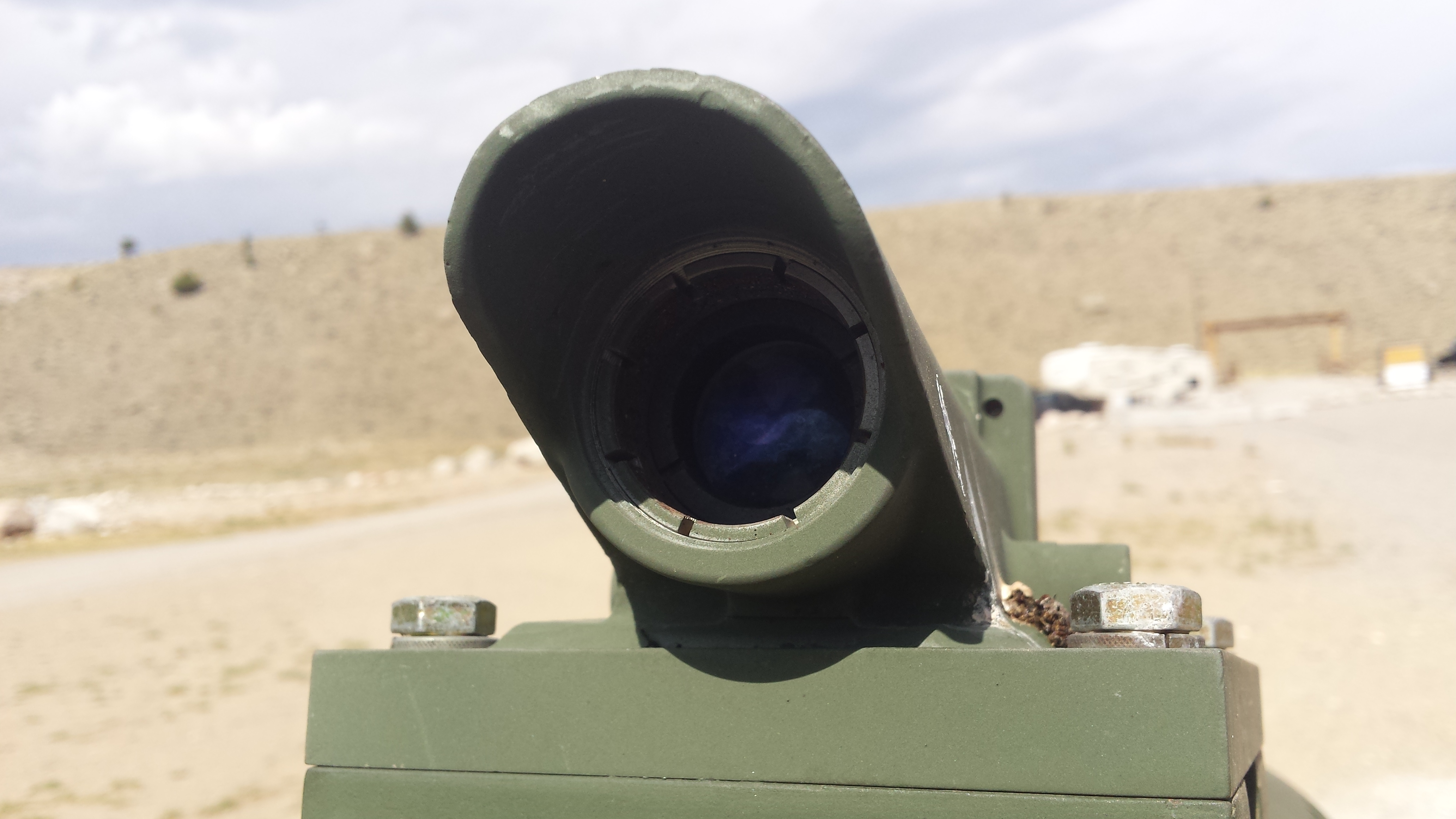
Laser rangefinder

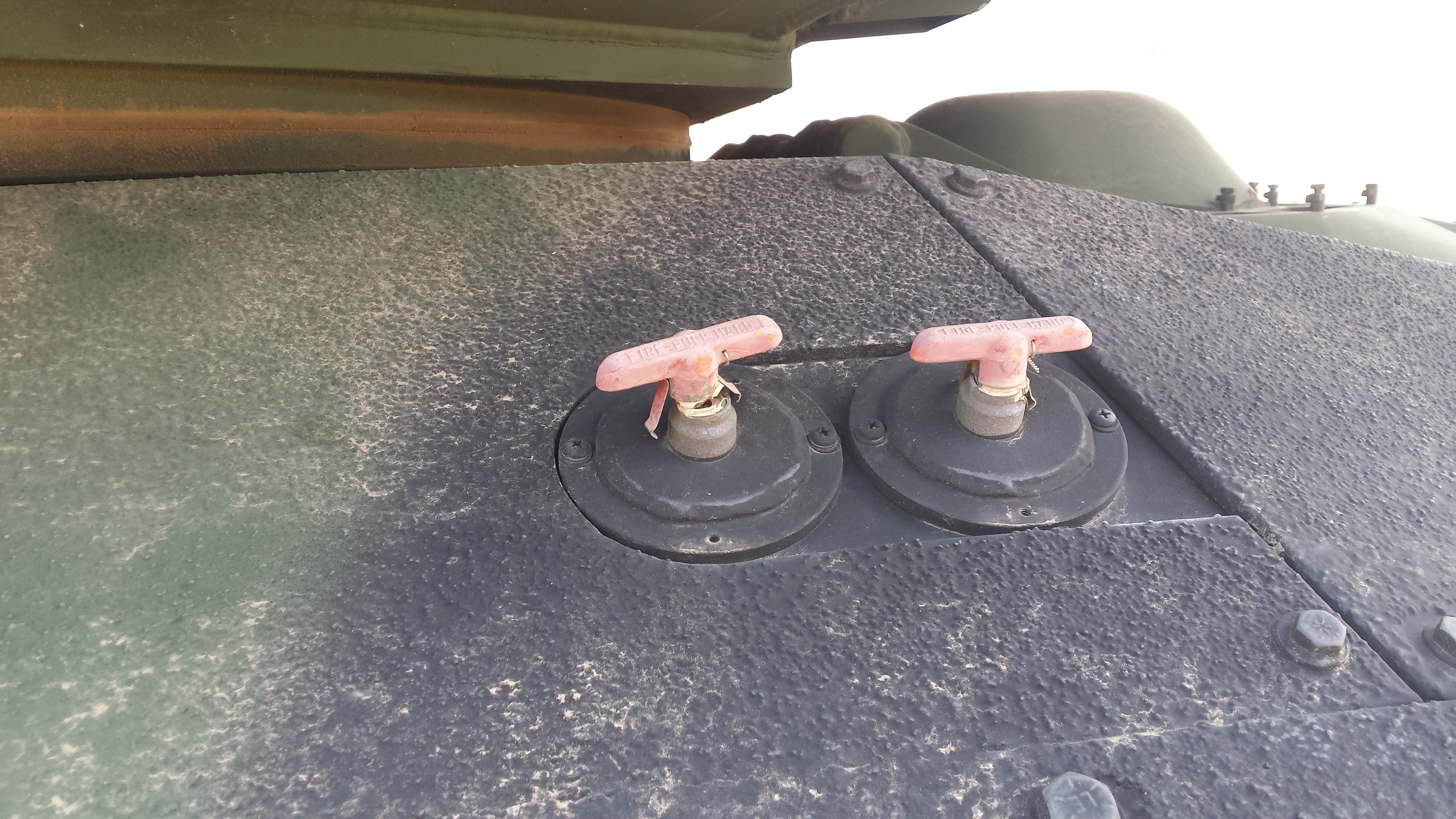
Fire extinguisher pull handles

BAE XM1302 MPF test vehicle 2 at the U.S. Army Armor and Cavalry Collection.

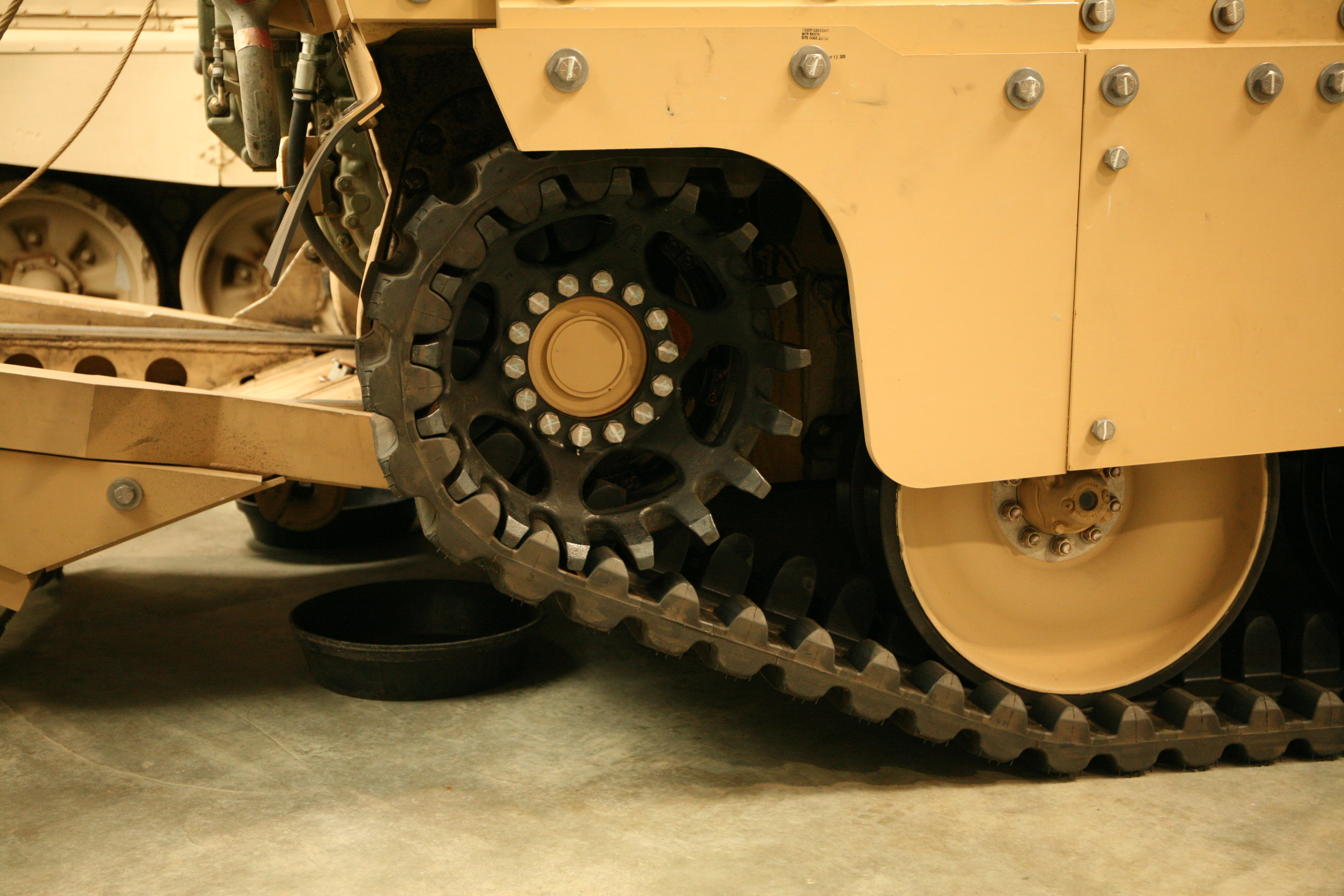
Rubber band track

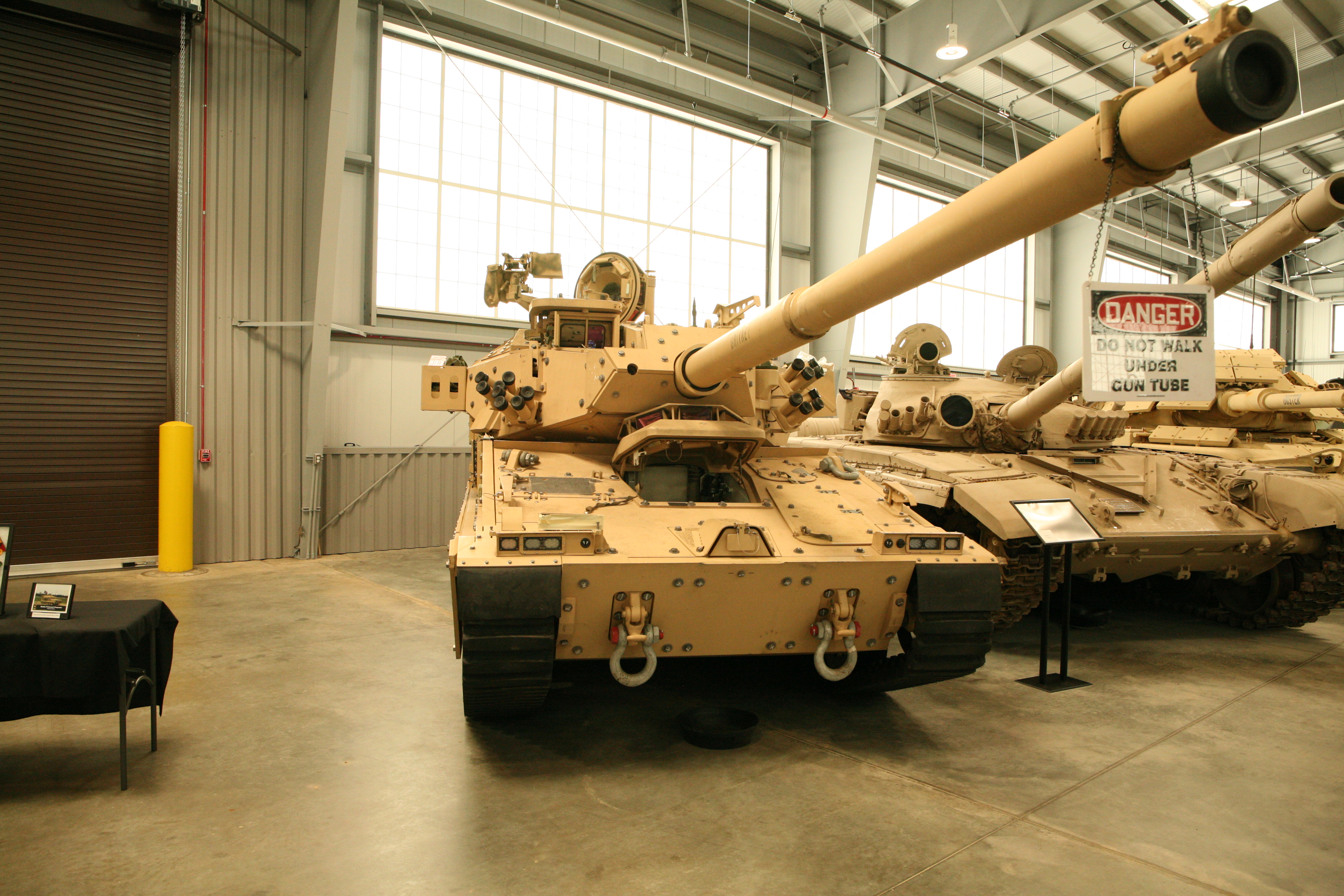

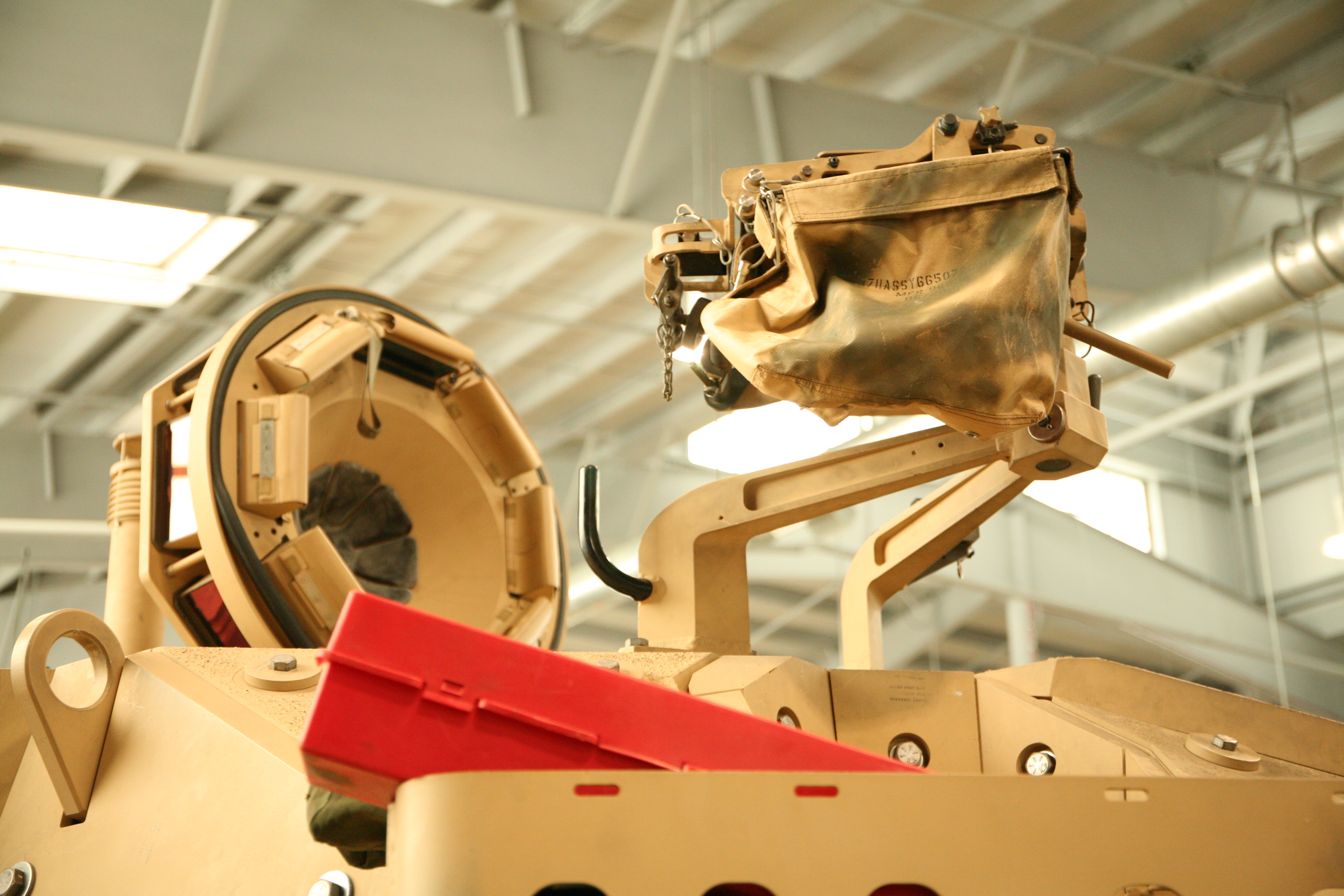
Commander's hatch

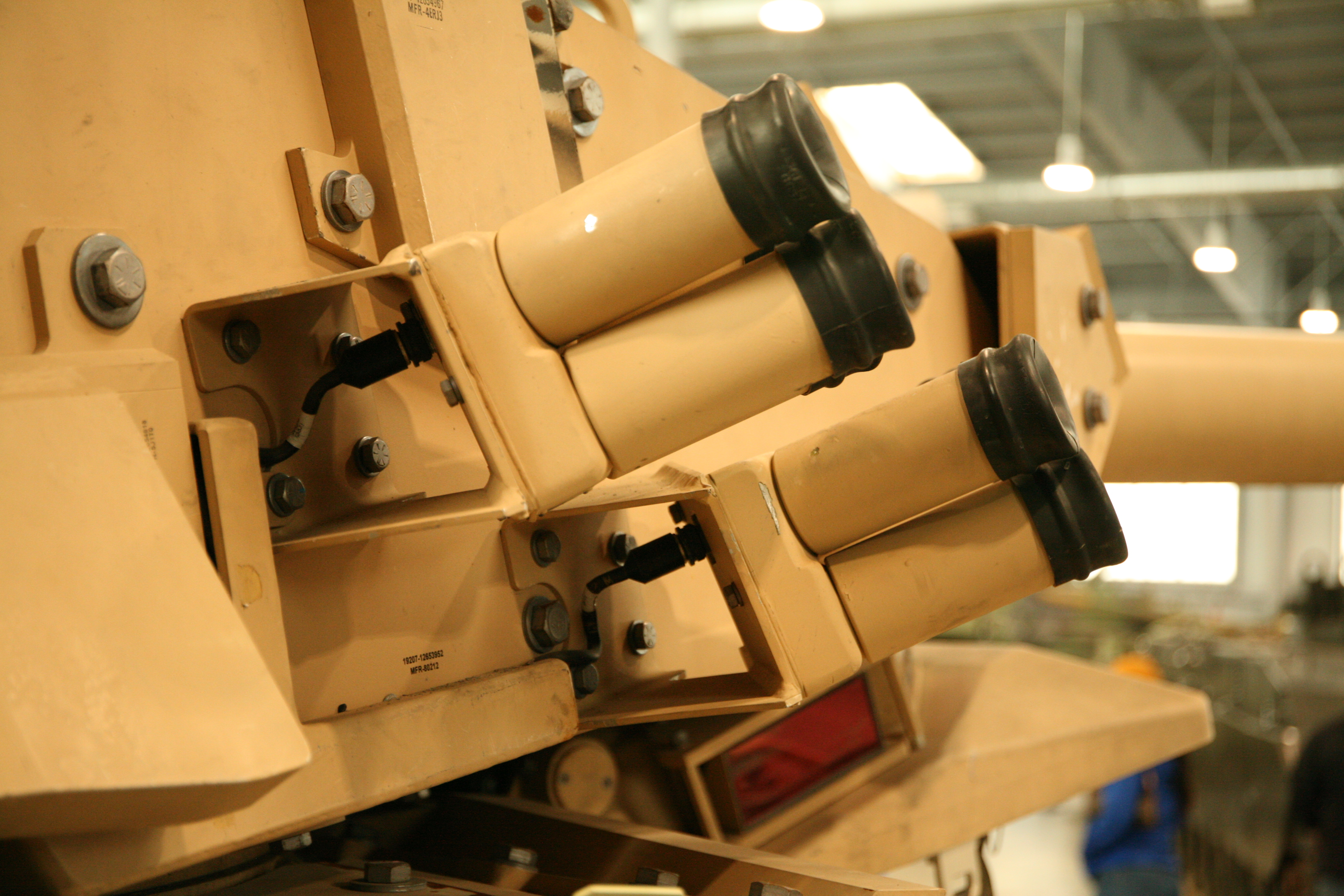
M257 smoke grenade launchers

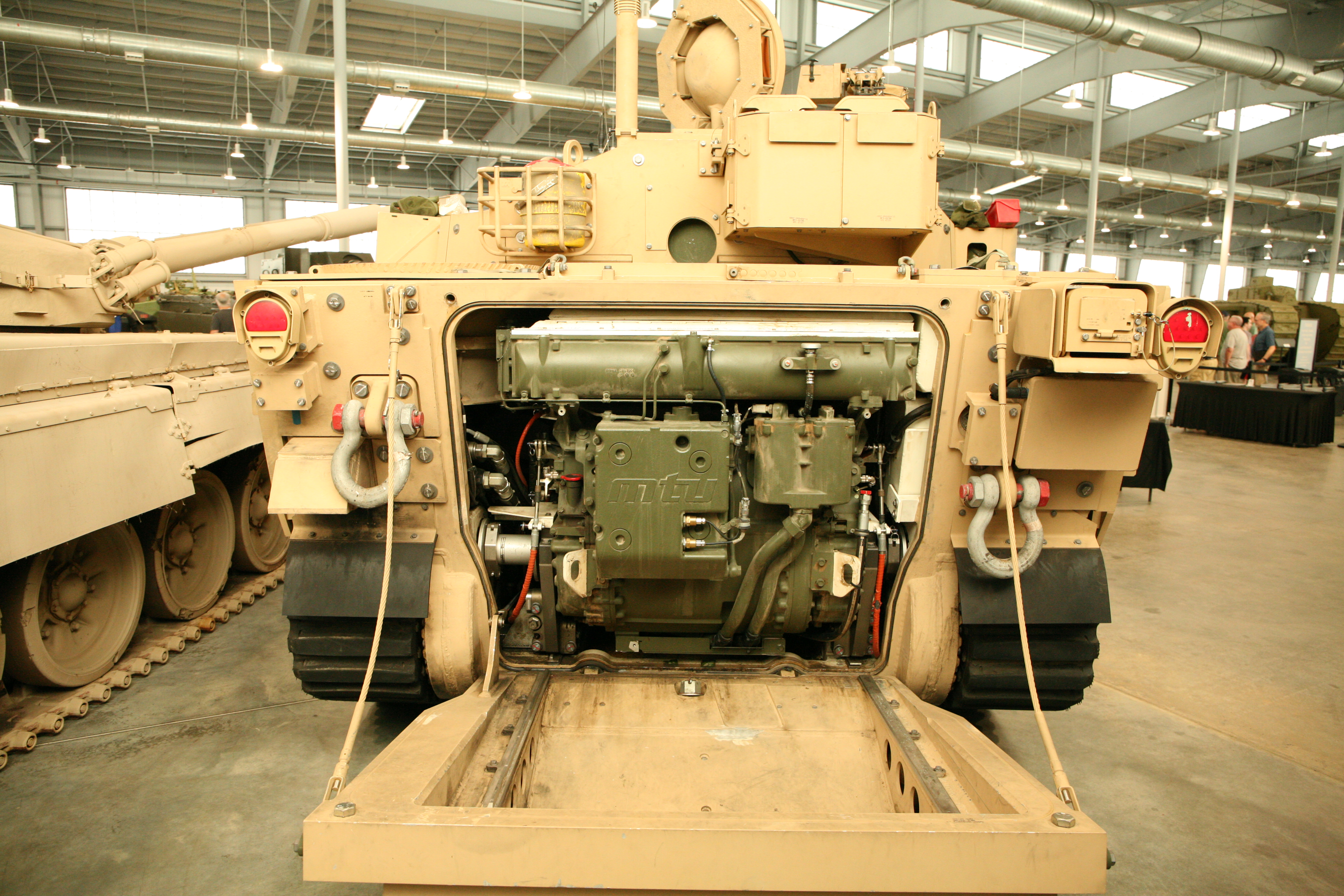
rear

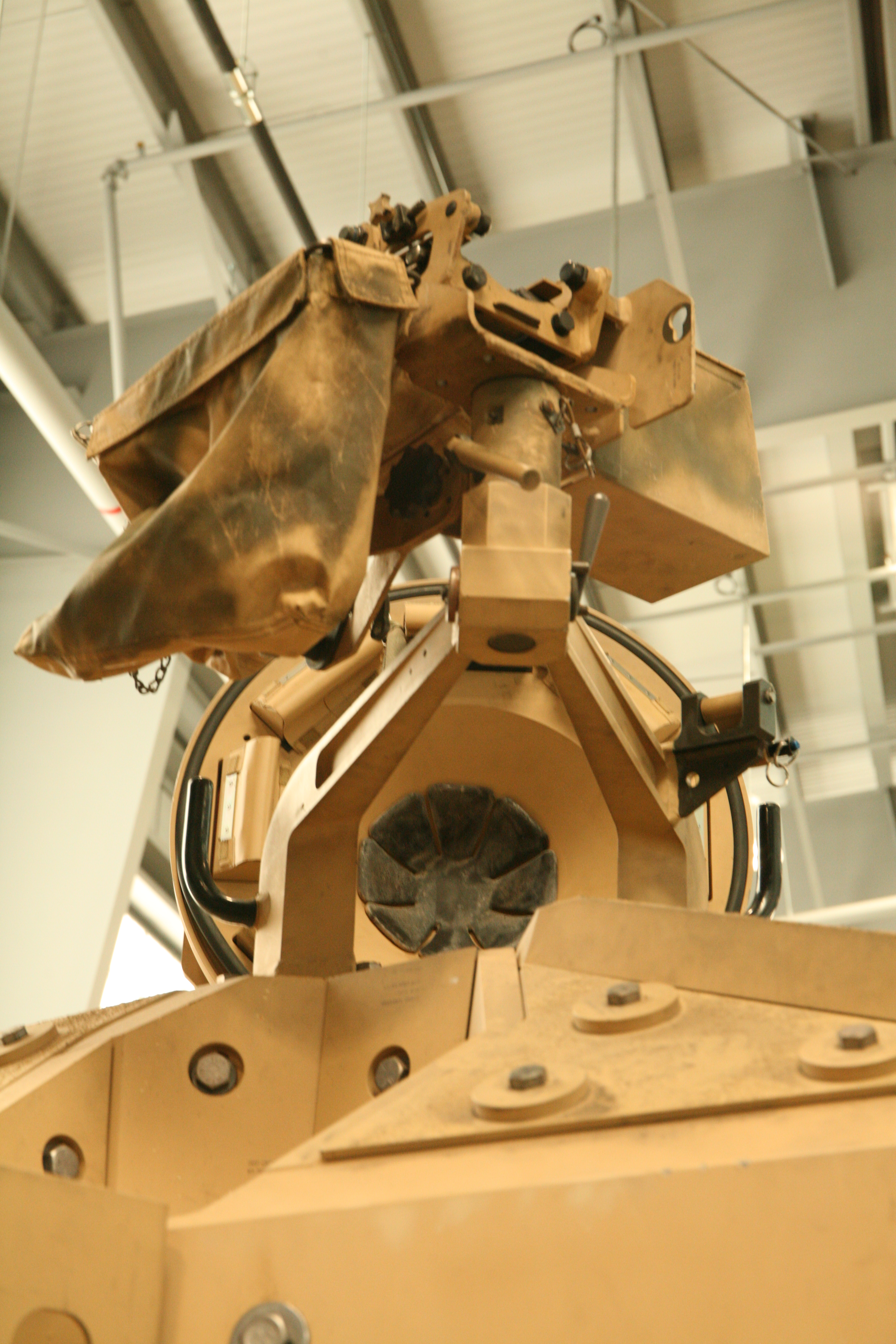
Pintle weapon mount

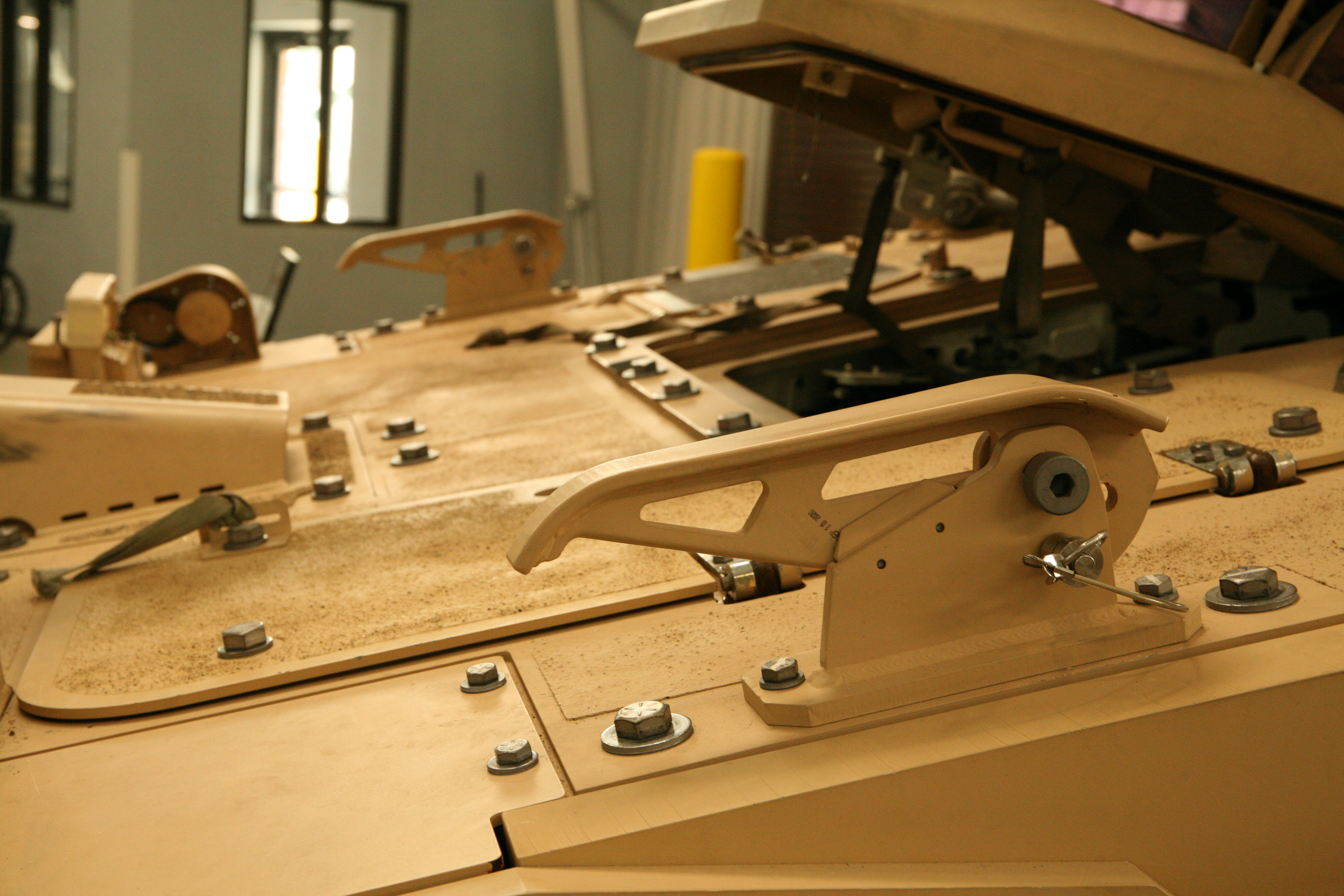
Wire cutters

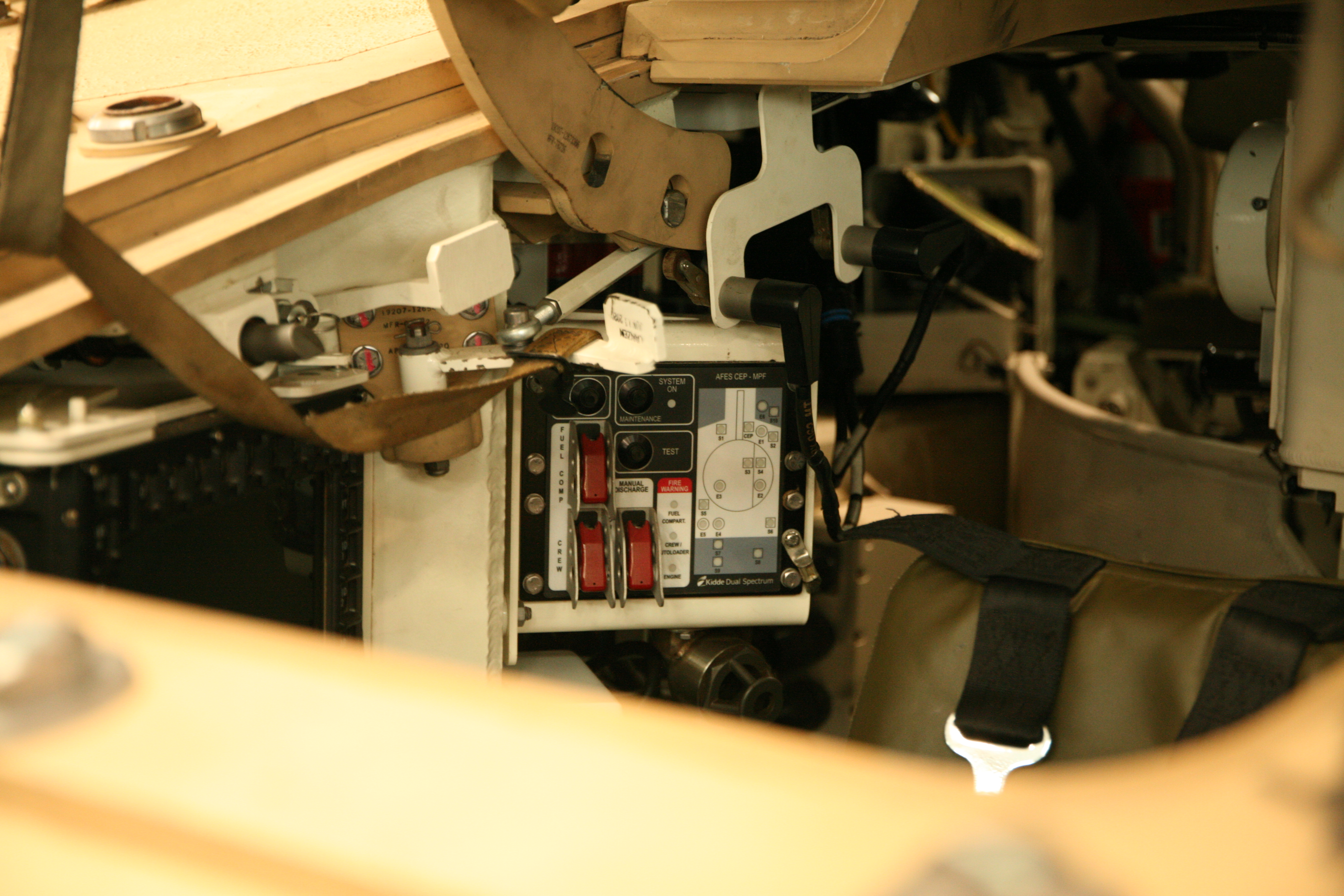
Kidde Control Electronics Panel fire suppression system

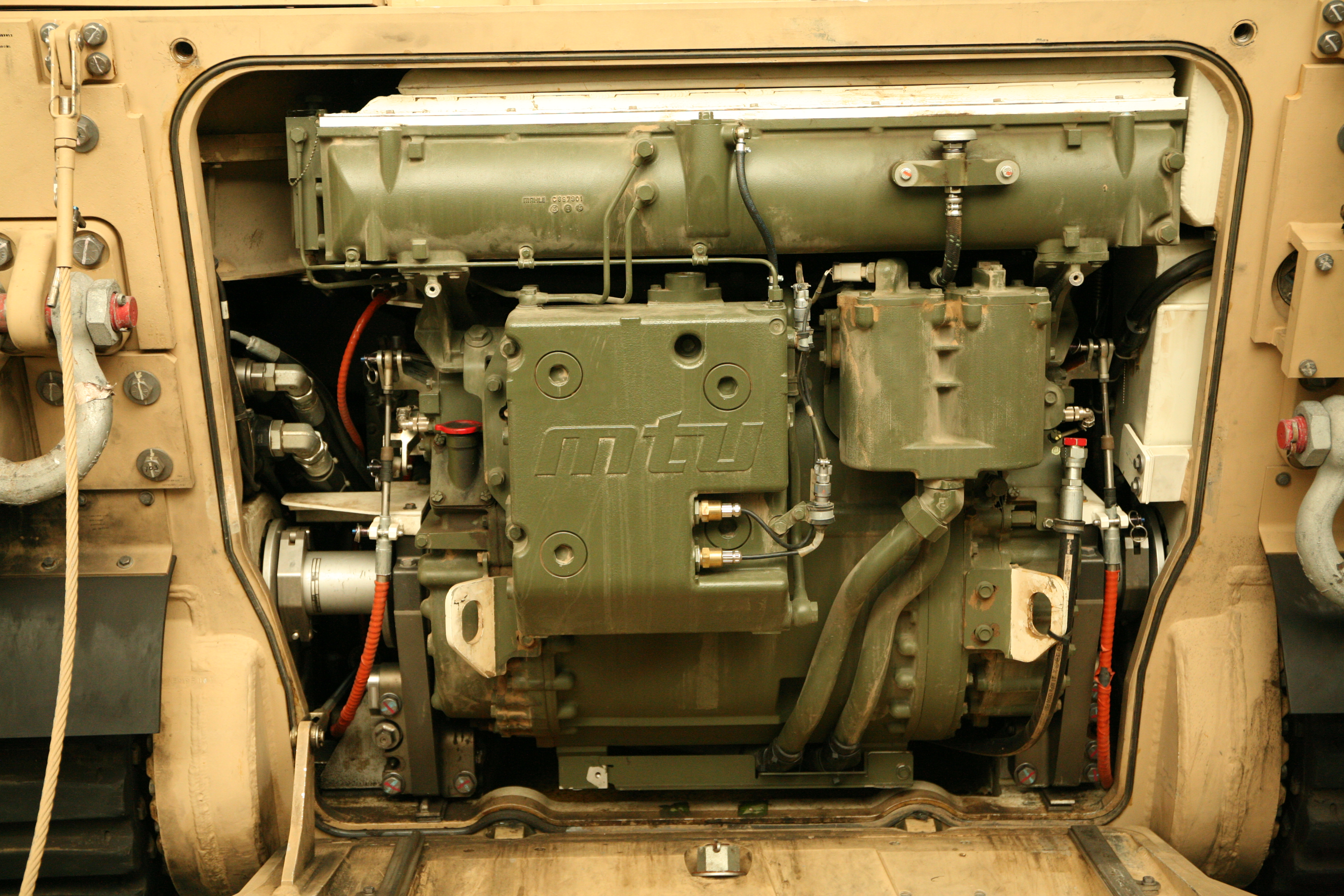
MTU engine

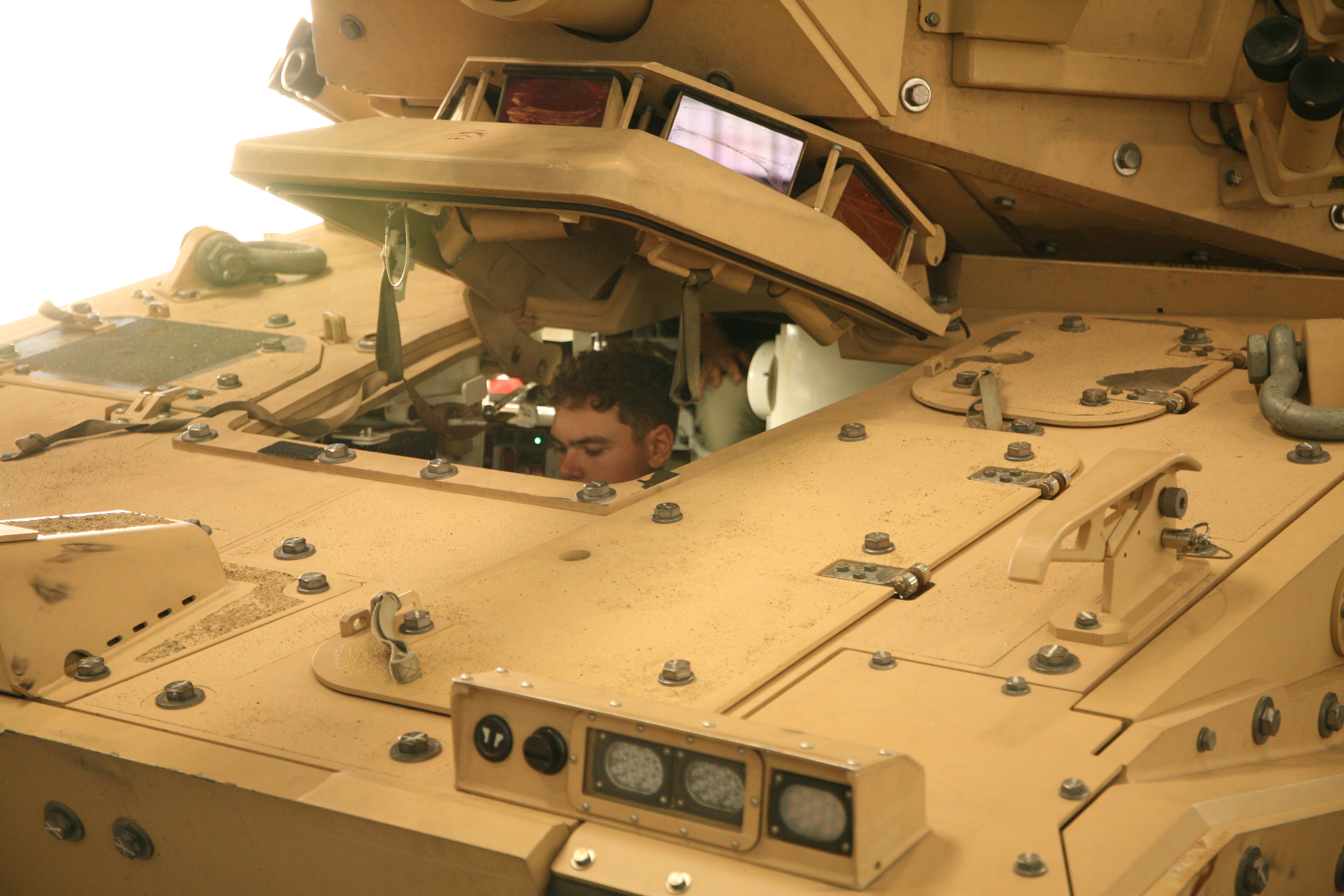
Driver's hatch

== See also ==
- 2S25 Sprut-SD, Russian airborne light tank
- XM1202 Mounted Combat System, a U.S. Army tank, that was part of the Future Combat Systems Manned Ground Vehicles program canceled in 2011
- Future Scout and Cavalry System/TRACER, a joint UK–U.S. scout vehicle canceled in 2001

== Bibliography ==
- Department of the Army (March 8, 1994). Light Armor Operations (FM 17-18) (PDF). This article incorporates text from this source, which is in the public domain.
- Department of the Army (April 1996). "656". Tank Platoon (FM 17-15) (PDF).
- Bowman, Stephen L.; Kendall, John M.; Saunders, James L., eds. (1989). Motorized Experience of the 9th Infantry Division 1980–1989 (PDF). Fort Lewis: Fort Lewis, Wash. OCLC 37397056. Archived (PDF) from the original on November 24, 2020. This article incorporates text from this source, which is in the public domain.
- Cullen, Tony; Foss, Christopher F, eds. (1997). Jane's Armour and Artillery Upgrades 1997–98 (10th ed.). Surrey: Jane's Information Group.
- Freeman, Major Marshall A. (April 5, 1991). The Army Needs a Strategic Armored Gun System—Now! (PDF) (War College Individual Study Project). U.S. Army War College, Carlisle Barracks. Archived (PDF) from the original on May 12, 2022. This article incorporates text from this source, which is in the public domain.
- Hagen, Lieutenant James A. (December 18, 1997). Employment of Light Infantry in Contingency Operations: What Do We Do Without Light Armor (PDF) (Monograph). U.S. Army Command and General Staff College Fort Leavenworth, Kansas. Archived (PDF) from the original on June 2, 2022. This article incorporates text from this source, which is in the public domain.
- Hunnicutt, Richard Pearce (2015a) [1995]. Sheridan: A History of the American Light Tank. Vol. 2. Battleboro, VT: Echo Point Books & Media. ISBN 978-1-62654-154-2.
- Nagl, Captain John A. (July–August 1992). "Sheridan Replacement Offers Better Firepower Plus Worldwide Mobility" (PDF). Armor. 101 (4). Fort Knox, KY: United States Army Armor Center: 26–29. Archived (PDF) from the original on December 23, 2018. This article incorporates text from this source, which is in the public domain.
- Office of the Assistant Secretary of the Army (Research, Development and Acquisition) (1996). Weapon Systems 1996 (PDF) (Report). This article incorporates text from this source, which is in the public domain.
- Preston, Major Andrew D. (May 26, 2004). Putting Armor Back Into the 82nd Airborne Division: Revisiting the AGS Decision (PDF) (Monograph). Fort Leavenworth, Kansas: U.S. Army School for Advanced Military Studies. Archived (PDF) from the original on May 6, 2021. This article incorporates text from this source, which is in the public domain.
- Shufelt Jr., Major James W. (May 1, 1993). Mobile Firepower for Contingency Operations: Emerging Concepts for U.S. Army Light Armor Forces (PDF) (Monograph). Fort Leavenworth, Kansas: U.S. Army School for Advanced Military Studies. This article incorporates text from this source, which is in the public domain.
- Tibbetts, Major John R. (December 17, 1994). The Impact of the Human Dimension on a Three-Man-Crew Tank (PDF) (Monograph). Fort Leavenworth, Kansas: U.S. Army School for Advanced Military Studies. This article incorporates text from this source, which is in the public domain.
- Wank, Lieutenant Colonel James A. (April 15, 1993). The Armored Gun System - An Acquisition Streamlining Model for the U.S. Army? (PDF) (Personal study). U.S. Army War College. Archived (PDF) from the original on June 2, 2022. This article incorporates text from this source, which is in the public domain.
- Zaloga, Stephen J. (2009). M551 Sheridan, US Airmobile Tanks 1941–2001. Oxford: Osprey Publishing Ltd. ISBN 978-1-84603-391-9.
