= List of awards and nominations received by Saving Grace (TV series) =

This is the list of awards and nominations received by the television series Saving Grace (2007–2010).

== By Awards ==
Award	Year	Category	Recipient	Result	Ref.
Emmy Awards	2008	Outstanding Actress - Drama Series	Holly Hunter	Nominated	
Emmy Awards	2008	Outstanding Original Main Title Theme Music	Eric "Everlast" Schrody	Nominated	
Emmy Awards	2009	Outstanding Actress - Drama Series	Holly Hunter	Nominated	
Golden Globe Awards	2008	Best Actress - Drama Series	Holly Hunter	Nominated	
Imagen Awards	2010	Best Supporting Actor - Television	Gregory Cruz	Nominated	
People's Choice Awards	2009	Favorite TV Drama Diva	Holly Hunter	Nominated	
Satellite Awards	2008	Best Actress in a Series - Drama	Holly Hunter	Nominated	
Saturn Awards	2008	Best Actress on Television	Holly Hunter	Nominated	
Saturn Awards	2008	Best Syndicated / Cable Television Series	—	Nominated	
Screen Actors Guild Awards	2008	Outstanding Actress - Drama Series	Holly Hunter	Nominated	
Screen Actors Guild Awards	2009	Outstanding Actress - Drama Series	Holly Hunter	Nominated	
Screen Actors Guild Awards	2010	Outstanding Actress - Drama Series	Holly Hunter	Nominated	
Young Artist Awards	2008	Best Young Actor Aged Ten or Under - TV Series	Dylan Minnette	Won	
Young Artist Awards	2009	Best Recurring Young Actor - TV Series	Dylan Minnette	Nominated	
