= 61st Primetime Emmy Awards =

2009 television programming awards

- Promotional poster
- Date: September 20, 2009 (Ceremony); September 12, 2009 (Creative Arts Awards)
- Location: Nokia Theatre, Los Angeles, California
- Presented by: Academy of Television Arts and Sciences
- Hosted by: Neil Patrick Harris

Highlights
- Most awards: Major: 30 Rock; Grey Gardens; Little Dorrit (3); All: Little Dorrit (7)
- Most nominations: 30 Rock (13)
- Outstanding Comedy Series: 30 Rock
- Outstanding Drama Series: Mad Men
- Outstanding Miniseries: Little Dorrit
- Outstanding Reality-Competition Program: The Amazing Race
- Outstanding Variety, Music or Comedy Series: The Daily Show with Jon Stewart
- Website: http://www.emmys.com/

Television/radio coverage
- Network: CBS
- Produced by: Don Mischer
- Directed by: Glenn Weiss

The 61st Primetime Emmy Awards were held on Sunday, September 20, 2009 on CBS. It took place at Nokia Theatre in Los Angeles, California, where 28 awards were presented. The nominations were announced on July 16, 2009.

On July 13, 2009, the Academy of Television Arts & Sciences announced that Neil Patrick Harris would host the Primetime ceremony (even going so far as to play Dr. Horrible at one point). The Creative Arts Emmy Awards for prime time were hosted by Kathy Griffin on September 12.

After the previous year's lackluster performance in ratings, the Primetime Emmy Awards were hoping to achieve success by selecting Harris as sole host, as opposed to a group of hosts as in the previous year. The 61st Primetime Emmy Awards earned a 4.2 rating in the 18–49 demo and drew 13.3 million, 1.1 million more than the previous year's all-time low.

30 Rock became the sixth show to win Outstanding Comedy Series three consecutive years, winning three major awards on that night. 30 Rock made history when it smashed the record for most major nominations by a comedy series with 18. The Cosby Show had held the record of 13 since 1986, while 30 Rock had tied this the previous year. The 18 major nominations became the third biggest record of all time, behind Roots' record number of 21 in 1977 and NYPD Blue's mark of 19 in 1994. Family Guy became the second animated series to be nominated for an Outstanding Comedy Award, after The Flintstones in 1961. These records still stand.

The drama field also crowned the defending champion, AMC's Mad Men. It won two major awards on that night. After airing for fifteen seasons, ER went out a winner as its series finale won for Outstanding Directing for a Drama Series. This was the first major win for ER since 2001.

Cherry Jones became the first from a Fox network show to win the award for Outstanding Supporting Actress in a Drama series but also the second woman ever from Fox to win a Major Acting award since Gillian Anderson in 1997.

History was also made by The Daily Show with Jon Stewart and The Amazing Race. Both programs won their series categories for the seventh straight year, this broke the record for most consecutive victories in a major category of six that was held by The Mary Tyler Moore Show and Cagney & Lacey. The Amazing Race would lose the following year. However, in 2013, The Daily Show's streak was finally snapped by The Colbert Report, after a record of ten consecutive wins.

== Winners and nominees ==
Winners are listed first and highlighted in bold:

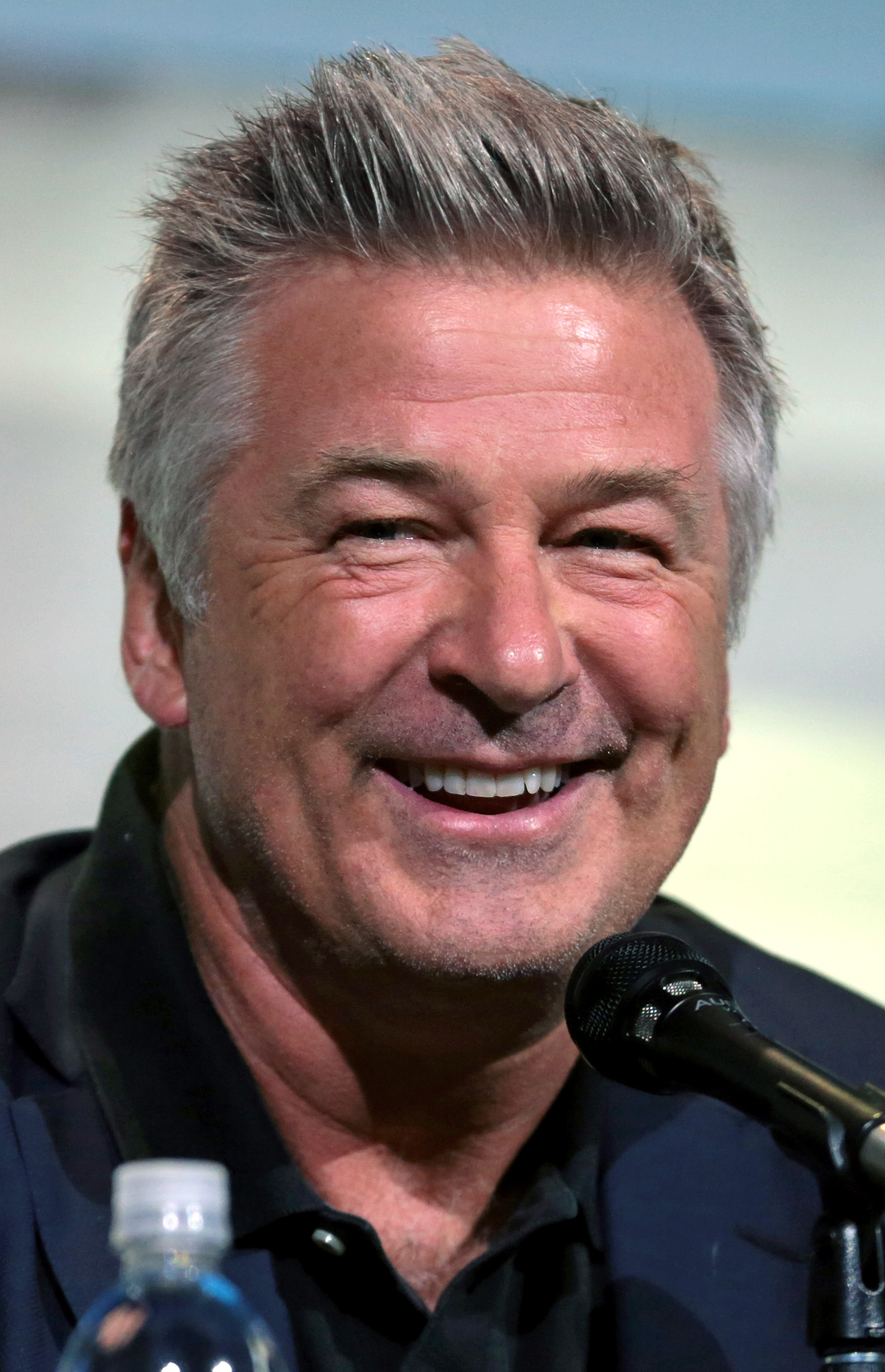
Alec Baldwin, Outstanding Lead Actor in a Comedy Series winner

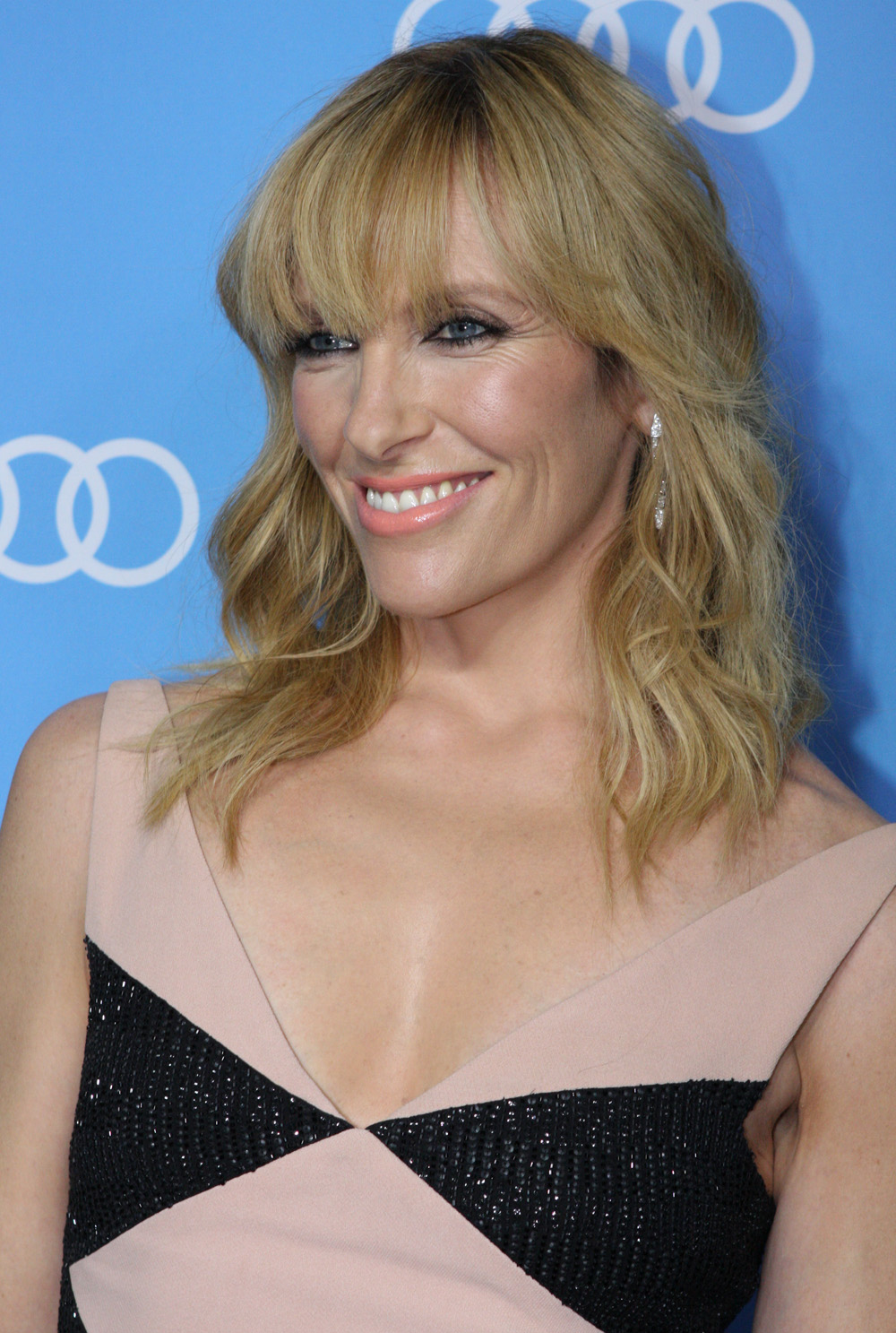
Toni Collette, Outstanding Lead Actress in a Comedy Series winner

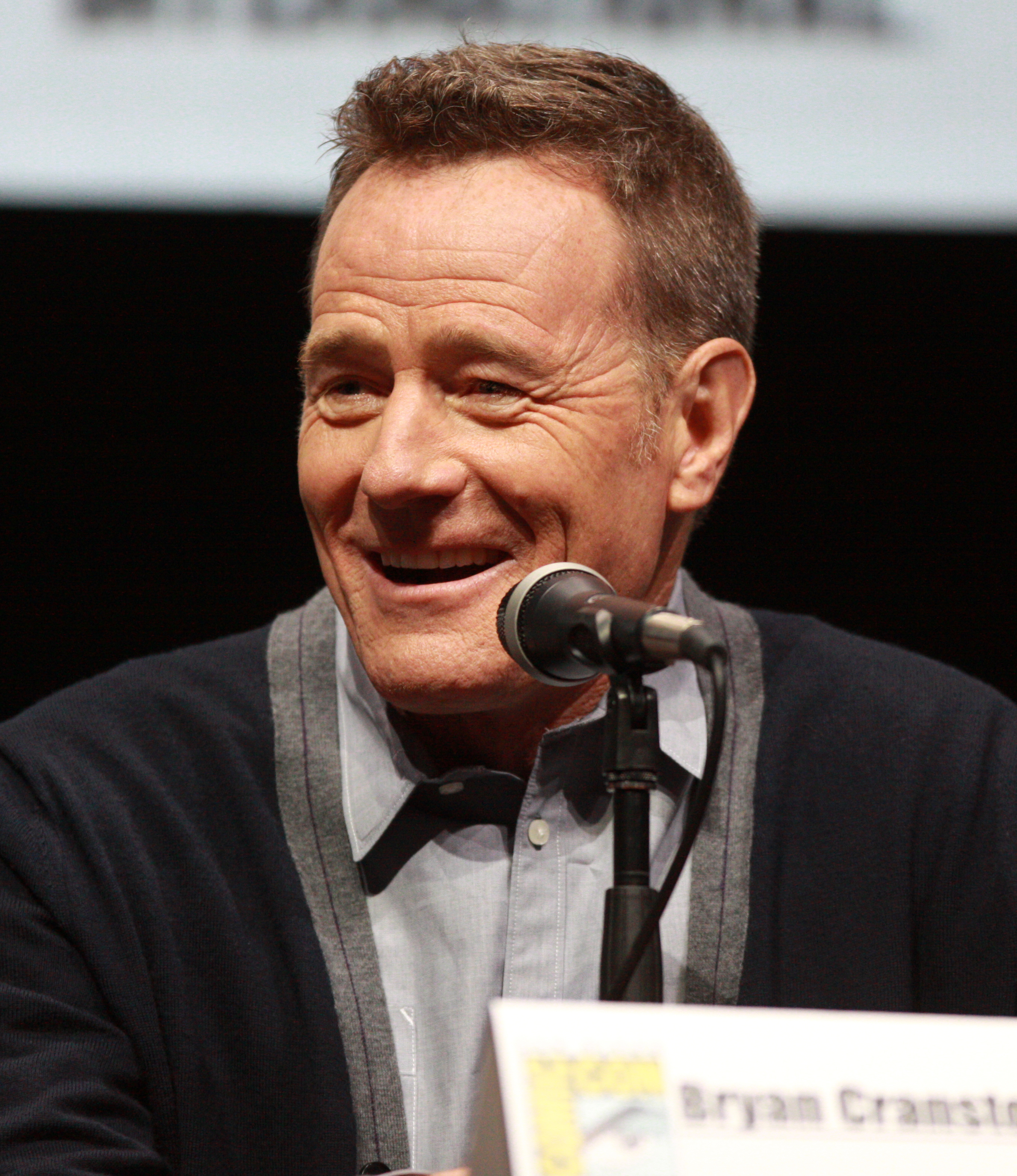
Bryan Cranston, Outstanding Lead Actor in a Drama Series winner

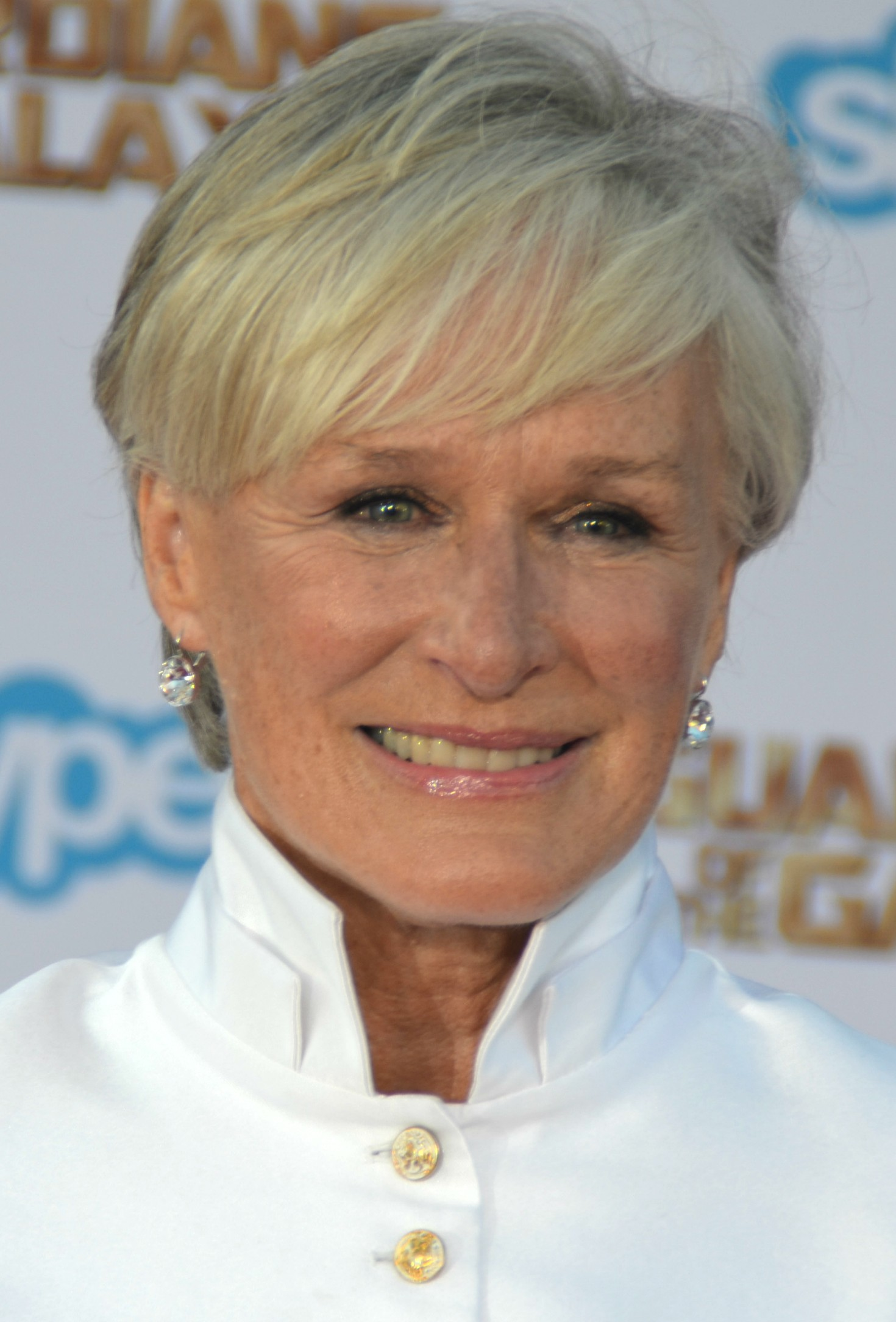
Glenn Close, Outstanding Lead Actress in a Drama Series winner

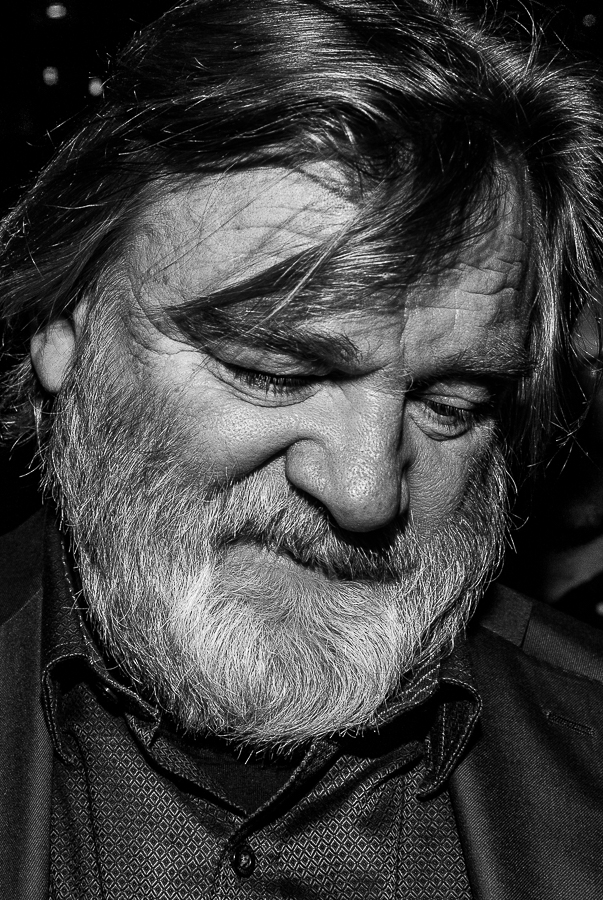
Brendan Gleeson, Outstanding Lead Actor in a Miniseries or Movie winner

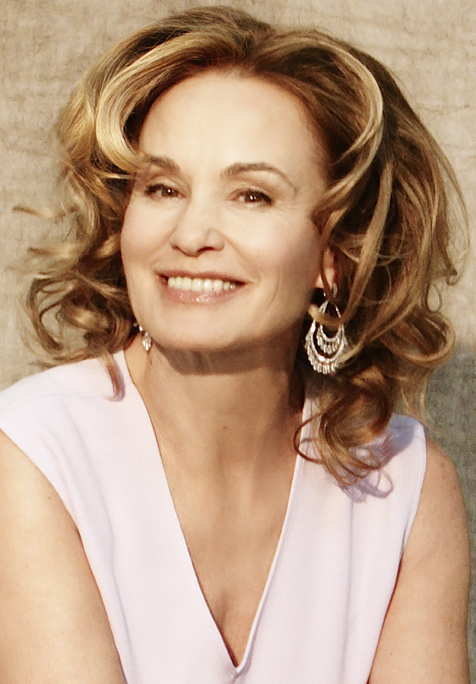
Jessica Lange, Outstanding Lead Actress in a Miniseries or Movie winner

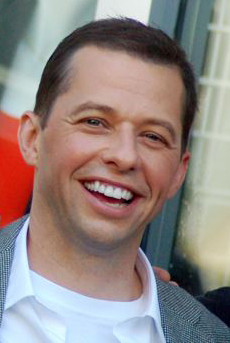
Jon Cryer, Outstanding Supporting Actor in a Comedy Series winner

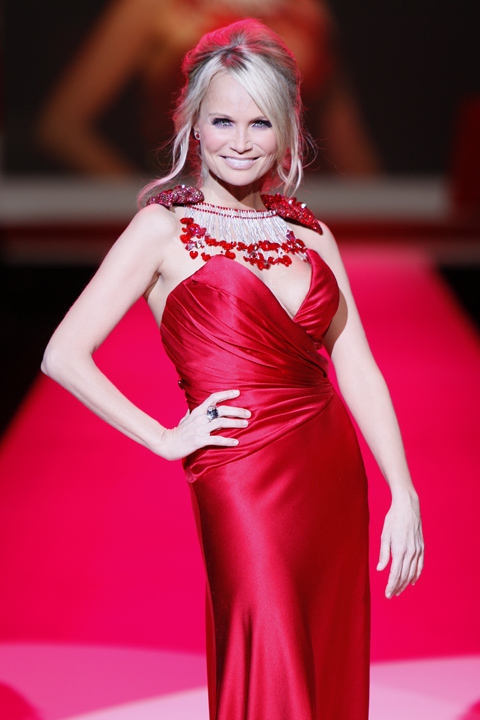
Kristin Chenoweth, Outstanding Supporting Actress in a Comedy Series winner

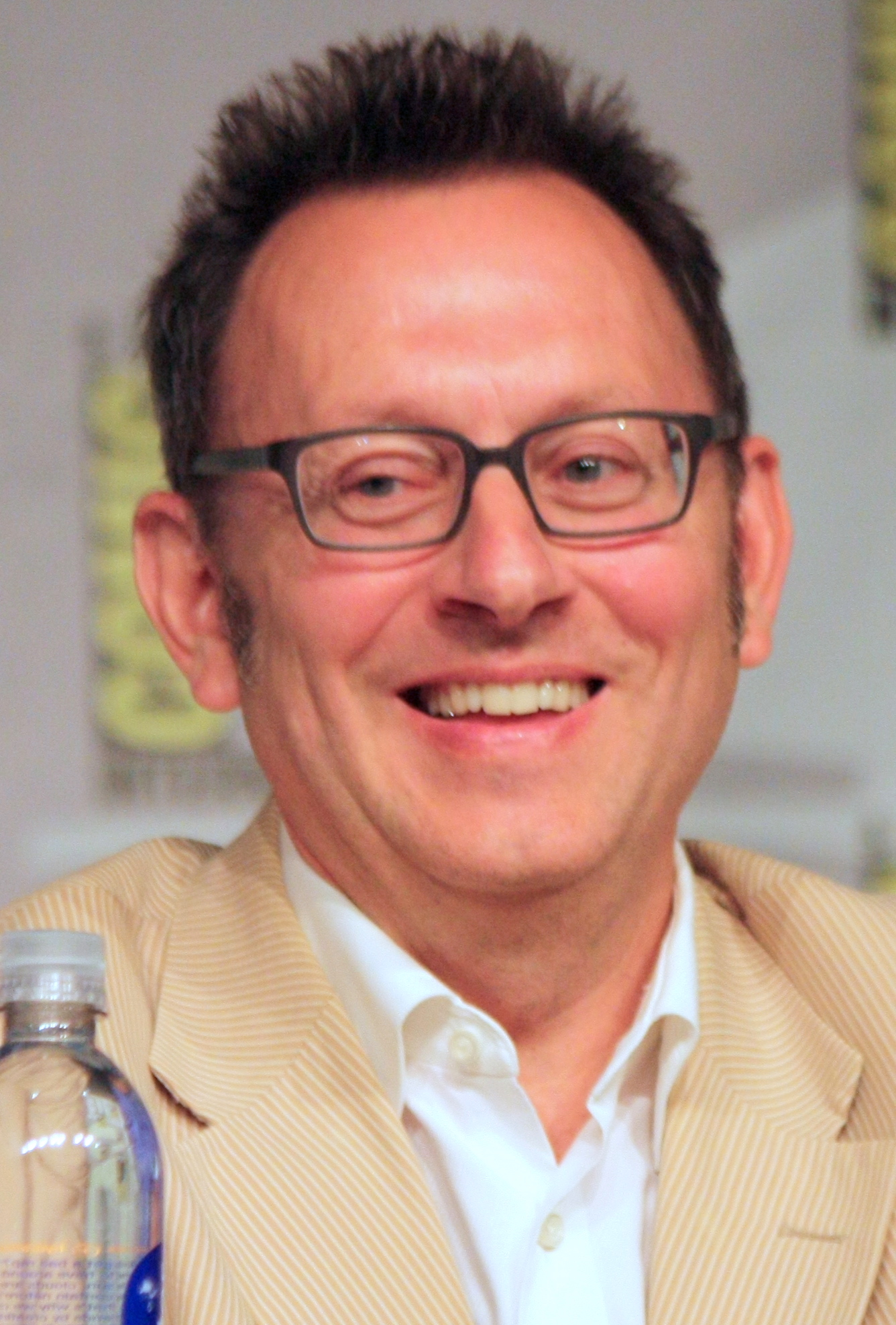
Michael Emerson, Outstanding Supporting Actor in a Drama Series winner

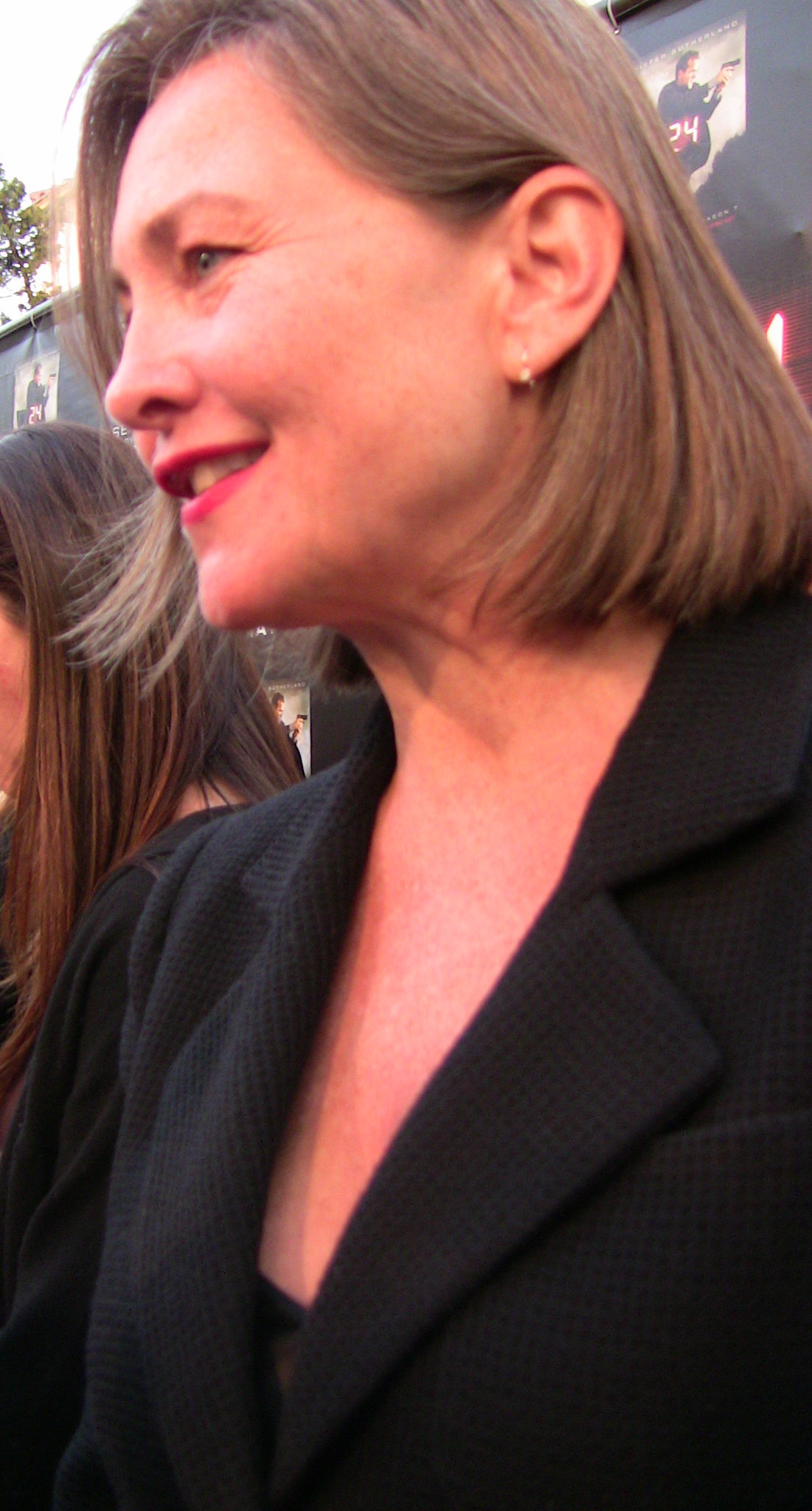
Cherry Jones, Outstanding Supporting Actress in a Drama Series winner

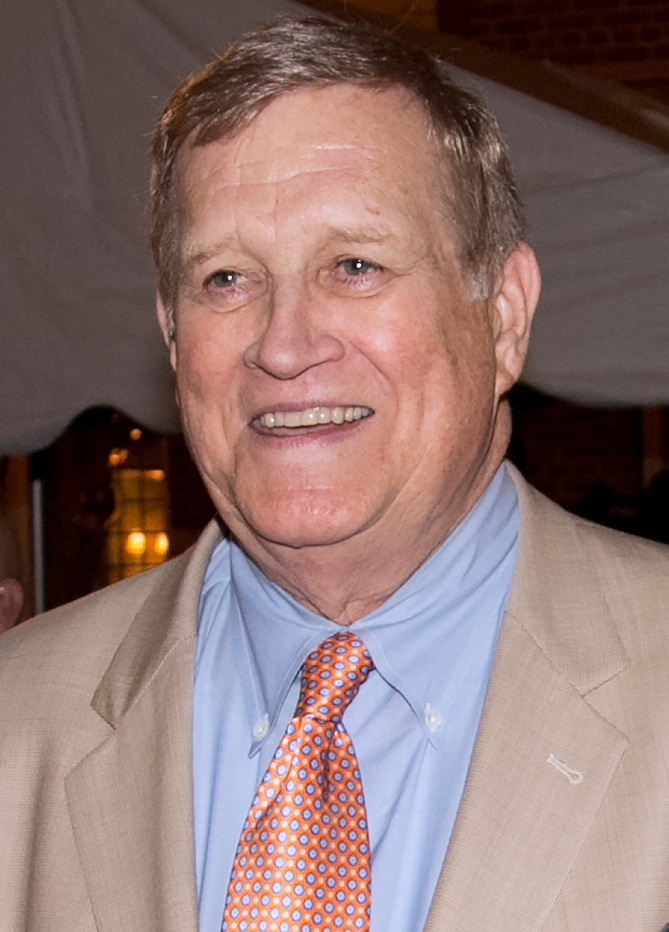
Ken Howard, Outstanding Supporting Actor in a Miniseries or Movie winner

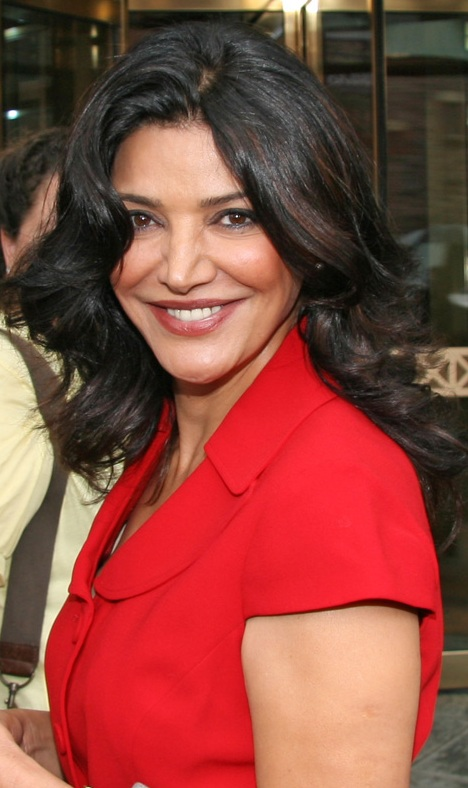
Shohreh Aghdashloo, Outstanding Supporting Actress in a Miniseries or Movie winner

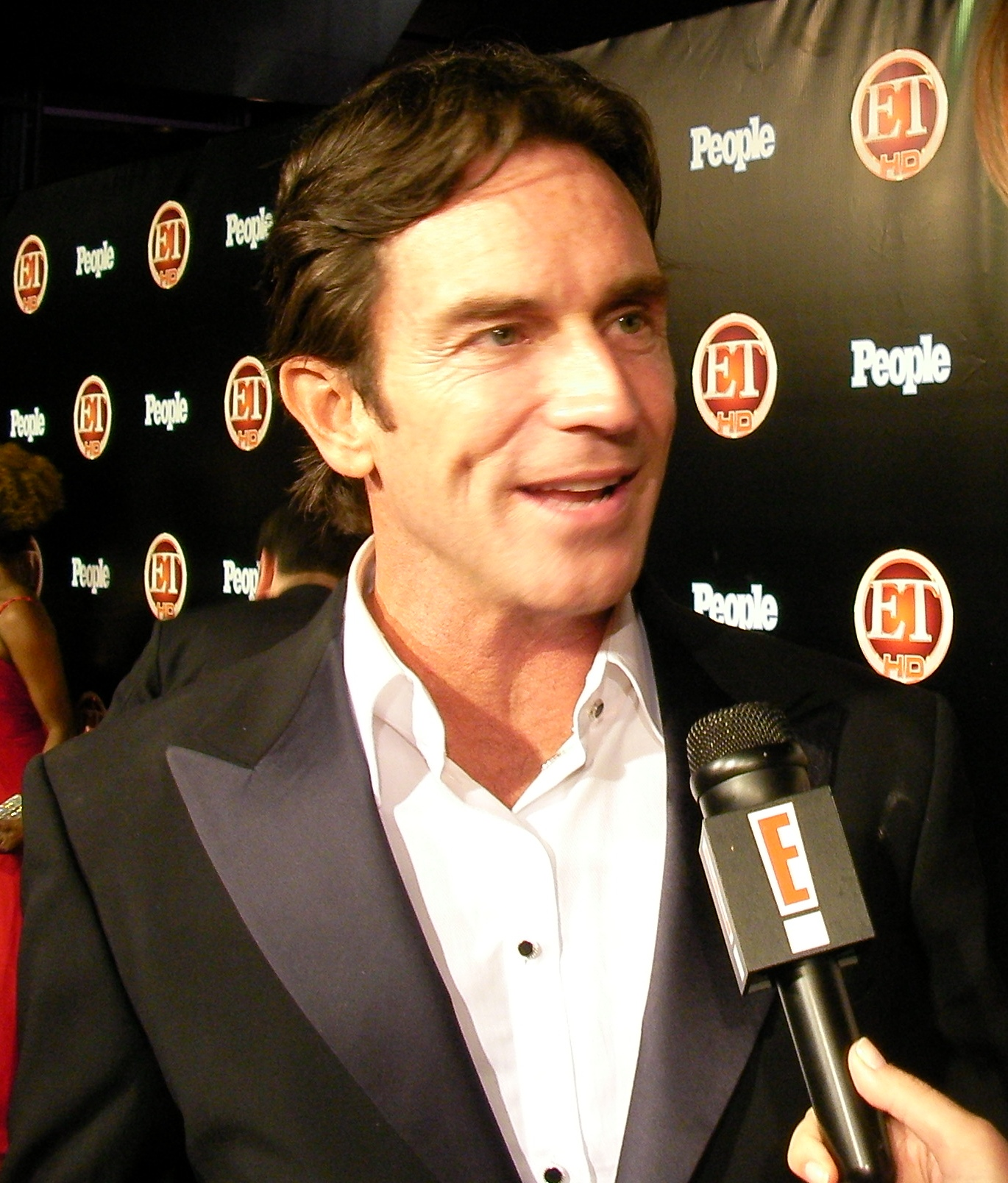
Jeff Probst, Outstanding Host for a Reality or Reality-Competition Program winner

=== Programs ===
Programs
| **Outstanding Comedy Series**: **30 Rock (NBC)**; Entourage (HBO); Family Guy (Fox); Flight of the Conchords (HBO); How I Met Your Mother (CBS); The Office (NBC); Weeds (Showtime) | **Outstanding Drama Series**: **Mad Men (AMC)**; Big Love (HBO); Breaking Bad (AMC); Damages (FX); Dexter (Showtime); House (Fox); Lost (ABC) |
| **Outstanding Made for Television Movie**: **Grey Gardens (HBO)**; Coco Chanel (Lifetime); Into the Storm (HBO); Prayers for Bobby (Lifetime); Taking Chance (HBO) | **Outstanding Miniseries**: **Little Dorrit (PBS)**; Generation Kill (HBO) |
| **Outstanding Variety, Music or Comedy Series**: **The Daily Show with Jon Stewart (Comedy Central)**; The Colbert Report (Comedy Central); Late Show with David Letterman (CBS); Real Time with Bill Maher (HBO); Saturday Night Live (NBC) | **Outstanding Reality-Competition Program**: **The Amazing Race (CBS)**; American Idol (Fox); Dancing with the Stars (ABC); Project Runway (Bravo); Top Chef (Bravo) |

=== Acting ===
==== Lead performances ====
Lead performances
| **Outstanding Lead Actor in a Comedy Series**: **Alec Baldwin – 30 Rock as Jack Donaghy (NBC)**; Steve Carell – The Office as Michael Scott (NBC); Jemaine Clement – Flight of the Conchords as Jemaine (HBO); Jim Parsons – The Big Bang Theory as Dr. Sheldon Cooper (CBS); Tony Shalhoub – Monk as Adrian Monk (USA); Charlie Sheen – Two and a Half Men as Charlie Harper (CBS) | **Outstanding Lead Actress in a Comedy Series**: **Toni Collette – United States of Tara as Tara Gregson (Showtime)**; Christina Applegate – Samantha Who? as Samantha Newly (ABC); Tina Fey – 30 Rock as Liz Lemon (NBC); Julia Louis-Dreyfus – The New Adventures of Old Christine as Christine Campbell (CBS); Mary-Louise Parker – Weeds as Nancy Botwin (Showtime); Sarah Silverman – The Sarah Silverman Program as herself (Comedy Central) |
| **Outstanding Lead Actor in a Drama Series**: **Bryan Cranston – Breaking Bad as Walter White (AMC)**; Simon Baker – The Mentalist as Patrick Jane (CBS); Gabriel Byrne – In Treatment as Dr. Paul Weston (HBO); Michael C. Hall – Dexter as Dexter Morgan (Showtime); Jon Hamm – Mad Men as Don Draper (AMC); Hugh Laurie – House as Dr. Gregory House (Fox) | **Outstanding Lead Actress in a Drama Series**: **Glenn Close – Damages as Patty Hewes (FX)**; Sally Field – Brothers & Sisters as Nora Walker (ABC); Mariska Hargitay – Law & Order: Special Victims Unit as Olivia Benson (NBC); Holly Hunter – Saving Grace as Grace Hanadarko (TNT); Elisabeth Moss – Mad Men as Peggy Olson (AMC); Kyra Sedgwick – The Closer as Brenda Leigh Johnson (TNT) |
| **Outstanding Lead Actor in a Miniseries or Movie**: **Brendan Gleeson – Into the Storm as Sir Winston Churchill (HBO)**; Kevin Bacon – Taking Chance as Lt. Colonel Michael Strobl (HBO); Kenneth Branagh – Wallander: One Step Behind as Kurt Wallander (PBS); Kevin Kline – Cyrano de Bergerac as Cyrano de Bergerac (PBS); Ian McKellen – King Lear as King Lear (PBS); Kiefer Sutherland – 24: Redemption as Jack Bauer (Fox) | **Outstanding Lead Actress in a Miniseries or Movie**: **Jessica Lange – Grey Gardens as Edith "Big Edie" Beale (HBO)**; Drew Barrymore – Grey Gardens as Edith "Little Edie" Beale (HBO); Shirley MacLaine – Coco Chanel as Gabrielle "Coco" Chanel (Lifetime); Sigourney Weaver – Prayers for Bobby as Mary Griffith (Lifetime); Chandra Wilson – Accidental Friendship as Yvonne Caldwell (Hallmark Channel) |

==== Supporting performances ====
Supporting performances
| **Outstanding Supporting Actor in a Comedy Series**: **Jon Cryer – Two and a Half Men as Dr. Alan Harper (CBS)**; Kevin Dillon – Entourage as Johnny "Drama" Chase (HBO); Neil Patrick Harris – How I Met Your Mother as Barney Stinson (CBS); Jack McBrayer – 30 Rock as Kenneth Parcell (NBC); Tracy Morgan – 30 Rock as Tracy Jordan (NBC); Rainn Wilson – The Office as Dwight Schrute (NBC) | **Outstanding Supporting Actress in a Comedy Series**: **Kristin Chenoweth – Pushing Daisies as Olive Snook (ABC)**; Jane Krakowski – 30 Rock as Jenna Maroney (NBC); Elizabeth Perkins – Weeds as Celia Hodes (Showtime); Amy Poehler – Saturday Night Live as various characters (NBC); Kristen Wiig – Saturday Night Live as various characters (NBC); Vanessa Williams – Ugly Betty as Wilhelmina Slater (ABC) |
| **Outstanding Supporting Actor in a Drama Series**: **Michael Emerson – Lost as Ben Linus (ABC)**; Christian Clemenson – Boston Legal as Jerry Espenson (ABC); William Hurt – Damages as Daniel Purcell (FX); Aaron Paul – Breaking Bad as Jesse Pinkman (AMC); William Shatner – Boston Legal as Denny Crane (ABC); John Slattery – Mad Men as Roger Sterling Jr. (AMC) | **Outstanding Supporting Actress in a Drama Series**: **Cherry Jones – 24 as President Allison Taylor (Fox)**; Rose Byrne – Damages as Ellen Parsons (FX); Hope Davis – In Treatment as Mia Nesky (HBO); Sandra Oh – Grey's Anatomy as Dr. Cristina Yang (ABC); Dianne Wiest – In Treatment as Dr. Gina Toll (HBO); Chandra Wilson – Grey's Anatomy as Dr. Miranda Bailey (ABC) |
| **Outstanding Supporting Actor in a Miniseries or Movie**: **Ken Howard – Grey Gardens as Phelan Beale (HBO)**; Len Cariou – Into the Storm as Franklin D. Roosevelt (HBO); Tom Courtenay – Little Dorrit as William Dorrit (PBS); Bob Newhart – The Librarian: Curse of the Judas Chalice as Judson (TNT); Andy Serkis – Little Dorrit as Rigaud / Blandois (PBS) | **Outstanding Supporting Actress in a Miniseries or Movie**: **Shohreh Aghdashloo – House of Saddam as Sajida Talfah (HBO)**; Marcia Gay Harden – The Courageous Heart of Irena Sendler as Janina Krzyżanowska (CBS); Janet McTeer – Into the Storm as Clementine Churchill (HBO); Jeanne Tripplehorn – Grey Gardens as Jacqueline "Jackie" Onassis (HBO); Cicely Tyson – Relative Stranger as Pearl (Hallmark Channel) |

=== Hosting ===
Hosting
**Outstanding Host for a Reality or Reality-Competition Program**
- **Jeff Probst – Survivor (CBS)**
  - Tom Bergeron – Dancing with the Stars (ABC)
  - Phil Keoghan – The Amazing Race (CBS)
  - Heidi Klum – Project Runway (Bravo)
  - Padma Lakshmi and Tom Colicchio – Top Chef (Bravo)
  - Ryan Seacrest – American Idol (Fox)

=== Music ===
Music
**Outstanding Original Music and Lyrics**
- **The 81st Annual Academy Awards: "Hugh Jackman Opening Number" – Music by William Ross & John Kimbrough; Lyrics by Dan Harmon, Rob Schrab & Ben Schwartz (ABC)**
  - The 2008 ESPYS: "I Love Sports" – Music by Katreese Barnes; Lyrics by Justin Timberlake, Steve Higgins, Alex Baze, Rachel Hamilton, Kevin Miller, Jonathan Drubner & Dave Drabik (ESPN)
  - A Colbert Christmas: The Greatest Gift of All: "Much Worse Things" – Music by Adam Schlesinger; Lyrics by David Javerbaum (Comedy Central)
  - Flight of the Conchords: "Carol Brown" (from "Unnatural Love" – Music and Lyrics by James Bobin, Bret McKenzie & Jemaine Clement (HBO)
  - A Muppets Christmas: Letters to Santa: "I Wish I Could Be Santa Claus" – Music and Lyrics by Paul Williams (NBC)
  - Saturday Night Live: "Motherlover" (from "Host: Justin Timberlake") – Music by Asa Taccone & Drew Campbell; Lyrics by Akiva Schaffer, Jorma Taccone, Andy Samberg & Justin Timberlake (NBC)

=== Directing ===
Directing
| **Outstanding Directing for a Comedy Series**: **The Office: "Stress Relief" – Jeffrey Blitz (NBC)**; 30 Rock: "Apollo, Apollo" – Millicent Shelton (NBC); 30 Rock: "Generalissimo" – Todd Holland (NBC); 30 Rock: "Reunion" – Beth McCarthy-Miller (NBC); Entourage: "Tree Trippers" – Julian Farino (HBO); Flight of the Conchords: "The Tough Brets" – James Bobin (HBO) | **Outstanding Directing for a Drama Series**: **ER: "And in the End..." – Rod Holcomb (NBC)**; Battlestar Galactica: "Daybreak, Part 2" – Michael Rymer (Sci Fi); Boston Legal: "Made in China" / "Last Call" – Bill D'Elia (ABC); Damages: "Trust Me" – Todd A. Kessler (FX); Mad Men: "The Jet Set" – Phil Abraham (AMC) |
| **Outstanding Directing for a Variety, Music or Comedy Series**: **American Idol: "Show 833 (The Final Three)" – Bruce Gowers (Fox)**; The Colbert Report: "4159" – Jim Hoskinson (Comedy Central); The Daily Show with Jon Stewart: "13107" – Chuck O'Neil (Comedy Central); Late Show with David Letterman: "Episode 2932" – Jerry Foley (CBS); Real Time with Bill Maher: "705" – Hal Grant (HBO); Saturday Night Live: "Host: Justin Timberlake" – Don Roy King (NBC) | **Outstanding Directing for a Miniseries, Movie or Dramatic Special**: **Little Dorrit – Dearbhla Walsh (PBS)**; Generation Kill: "Bomb in the Garden" – Susanna White (HBO); Grey Gardens – Michael Sucsy (HBO); Into the Storm – Thaddeus O'Sullivan (HBO); Taking Chance – Ross Katz (HBO); Wallander: One Step Behind – Philip Martin (PBS) |

=== Writing ===
Writing
| **Outstanding Writing for a Comedy Series**: **30 Rock: "Reunion" – Matt Hubbard (NBC)**; 30 Rock: "Apollo, Apollo" – Robert Carlock (NBC); 30 Rock: "Kidney Now!" – Jack Burditt and Robert Carlock (NBC); 30 Rock: "Mamma Mia" – Ron Weiner (NBC); Flight of the Conchords: "Prime Minister" – James Bobin, Jemaine Clement, and Bret McKenzie (HBO) | **Outstanding Writing for a Drama Series**: **Mad Men: "Meditations in an Emergency" – Kater Gordon and Matthew Weiner (AMC)**; Lost: "The Incident" – Carlton Cuse and Damon Lindelof (ABC); Mad Men: "A Night to Remember" – Robin Veith and Matthew Weiner (AMC); Mad Men: "The Jet Set" – Matthew Weiner (AMC); Mad Men: "Six Month Leave" – Andre Jacquemetton, Maria Jacquemetton, and Matthew Weiner (AMC) |
| **Outstanding Writing for a Variety, Music or Comedy Series**: **The Daily Show with Jon Stewart (Comedy Central)**; The Colbert Report (Comedy Central); Late Night with Conan O'Brien (NBC); Late Show with David Letterman (CBS); Saturday Night Live (NBC) | **Outstanding Writing for a Miniseries, Movie or Dramatic Special**: **Little Dorrit – Andrew Davies (PBS)**; Generation Kill: "Bomb in the Garden" – David Simon and Ed Burns (HBO); Grey Gardens – Patricia Rozema and Michael Sucsy (HBO); Into the Storm – Hugh Whitemore (HBO); Taking Chance – Ross Katz and Michael Strobl (HBO) |

== Most major nominations ==
Networks with multiple major nominations (Note: "Major" constitutes the categories listed above: Program, Acting, Directing, and Writing. Does not include the technical categories.)
| Network | No. of Nominations |
|---|---|
| HBO | 38 |
| NBC | 25 |
| CBS | 17 |
| ABC | 16 |
| AMC | 12 |

Programs with multiple major nominations
| Program | Category | Network | No. of Nominations |
|---|---|---|---|
| 30 Rock | Comedy | NBC | 13 |
| Mad Men | Drama | AMC | 9 |
| Grey Gardens | Movie | HBO | 7 |
| Into the Storm | Movie | HBO | 6 |
| Saturday Night Live | Variety | NBC | 6 |
| Damages | Drama | FX | 5 |
| Flight of the Conchords | Comedy | HBO | 5 |
| Little Dorrit | Miniseries | PBS | 5 |
| The Office | Comedy | NBC | 4 |
| Taking Chance | Movie | HBO | 4 |
| American Idol | Competition | Fox | 3 |
| Boston Legal | Drama | ABC | 3 |
| Breaking Bad | Drama | AMC | 3 |
| The Colbert Report | Variety | Comedy Central | 3 |
| The Daily Show with Jon Stewart | Variety | Comedy Central | 3 |
| Entourage | Comedy | HBO | 3 |
| Generation Kill | Miniseries | HBO | 3 |
| In Treatment | Drama | HBO | 3 |
| Late Show with David Letterman | Variety | CBS | 3 |
| Lost | Drama | ABC | 3 |
| Weeds | Comedy | Showtime | 3 |
| The Amazing Race | Competition | CBS | 2 |
| Coco Chanel | Movie | Lifetime | 2 |
| Dancing with the Stars | Competition | ABC | 2 |
| Dexter | Drama | Showtime | 2 |
| Grey's Anatomy | Drama | ABC | 2 |
| House | Drama | Fox | 2 |
| How I Met Your Mother | Comedy | CBS | 2 |
| Prayers for Bobby | Movie | Lifetime | 2 |
| Project Runway | Competition | Bravo | 2 |
| Real Time with Bill Maher | Variety | HBO | 2 |
| Top Chef | Competition | Bravo | 2 |
| Two and a Half Men | Comedy | CBS | 2 |
| Wallander: One Step Behind | Movie | PBS | 2 |

== Most major awards ==
Networks with multiple major awards
| Network | No. of Awards |
|---|---|
| HBO | 5 |
| NBC | 5 |
| ABC | 3 |
| AMC | 3 |
| CBS | 3 |
| PBS | 3 |
| Comedy Central | 2 |
| Fox | 2 |

Programs with multiple major awards
| Program | Category | Network | No. of Awards |
|---|---|---|---|
| 30 Rock | Comedy | NBC | 3 |
| Grey Gardens | Movie | HBO | 3 |
| Little Dorrit | Miniseries | PBS | 3 |
| The Daily Show with Jon Stewart | Variety | Comedy Central | 2 |
| Mad Men | Drama | AMC | 2 |

== Presenters ==
The awards were presented by the following:

| Name(s) | Role |
|---|---|
| Tina Fey; Jon Hamm | Presenters of the award for Outstanding Supporting Actress in a Comedy Series |
| Alyson Hannigan; Josh Radnor; Jason Segel; Cobie Smulders | Presenters of the award for Outstanding Writing for a Comedy Series |
| Julia Louis-Dreyfus; Amy Poehler | Presenters of the award for Outstanding Supporting Actor in a Comedy Series |
| Justin Timberlake | Presenter of the award for Outstanding Lead Actress in a Comedy Series |
| Blake Lively; Leighton Meester | Introducers of Outstanding Guest Actor in a Comedy Series winner Justin Timberlake and Outstanding Guest Actress in a Comedy Series winner Tina Fey; Presenters of the award for Outstanding Directing for a Comedy Series |
| Rob Lowe | Presenter of the award for Outstanding Lead Actor in a Comedy Series |
| Jon Cryer; Hayden Panettiere | Presenters of the award for Outstanding Host for a Reality or Reality-Competition Program |
| Tracy Morgan | Presenter of the award for Outstanding Reality-Competition Program |
| Kevin Bacon; Kyra Sedgwick | Presenters of the awards for Outstanding Supporting Actress in a Miniseries or Movie and Outstanding Supporting Actor in a Miniseries or Movie |
| Kate Walsh; Chandra Wilson | Presenters of the award for Outstanding Lead Actor in a Miniseries or Movie |
| Patricia Arquette; Jennifer Love Hewitt | Presenters of the awards for Outstanding Writing for a Miniseries, Movie or Dramatic Special and Outstanding Directing for a Miniseries, Movie or Dramatic Special |
| Alec Baldwin | Presenter of the award for Outstanding Lead Actress in a Miniseries or Movie |
| Kiefer Sutherland; Anna Torv | Presenters of the awards for Outstanding Made for Television Movie and Outstanding Miniseries |
| Kaley Cuoco; Johnny Galecki; Jim Parsons | Presenters of the awards for Outstanding Directing for a Variety, Music or Comedy Series and Outstanding Writing for a Variety, Music or Comedy Series |
| Jimmy Fallon | Presenter of the award for Outstanding Original Music and Lyrics |
| Ricky Gervais | Presenter of the award for Outstanding Variety, Music or Comedy Series |
| LL Cool J Chris O'Donnell | Presenters of the awards for Outstanding Supporting Actor in a Drama Series and Outstanding Supporting Actress in a Drama Series |
| David Boreanaz; Stephen Moyer | Introducers of Outstanding Guest Actor in a Drama Series winner Michael J. Fox and Outstanding Guest Actress in a Drama Series winner Ellen Burstyn |
| Ellen Burstyn; Michael J. Fox | Presenters of the awards for Outstanding Directing for a Drama Series and Outstanding Writing for a Drama Series |
| Simon Baker | Presenter of the award for Outstanding Lead Actress in a Drama Series |
| Dana Delany | Presenter of the award for Outstanding Lead Actor in a Drama Series |
| Bob Newhart | Presenter of the award for Outstanding Comedy Series |
| Sigourney Weaver | Presenter of the award for Outstanding Drama Series |

== In Memoriam ==
The singer Sarah McLachlan performed the song "I Will Remember You" during the tribute:

- Edie Adams
- Gale Storm
- Van Johnson
- Eartha Kitt
- Neal Hefti
- Patrick McGoohan
- Morton Lachman
- Karl Malden
- James Whitmore
- Sam Cohn
- Henry Gibson
- Bill Melendez
- Pat Hingle
- Paul Benedict
- Bernie Hamilton
- Dom DeLuise
- Dominick Dunne
- Robert Prosky
- Fred Travalena
- Irving R. Levine
- Ron Silver
- Natasha Richardson
- David Carradine
- Nora O'Brien
- Michael Crichton
- Beatrice Arthur
- Ricardo Montalbán
- Ed McMahon
- Army Archerd
- Larry Gelbart
- Paul Newman
- Pierre Cossette
- Michael Jackson
- Patrick Swayze
- Don Hewitt
- Farrah Fawcett
- Walter Cronkite
