= Ross Katz =

American film director

Ross Katz (born May 19, 1971, in Philadelphia, Pennsylvania) is an American film producer, screenwriter and film director. He has executive produced films including In the Bedroom and Lost in Translation, and has directed the films Adult Beginners (2014) and The Choice (2016), and the HBO film Taking Chance (2009).

== Career ==
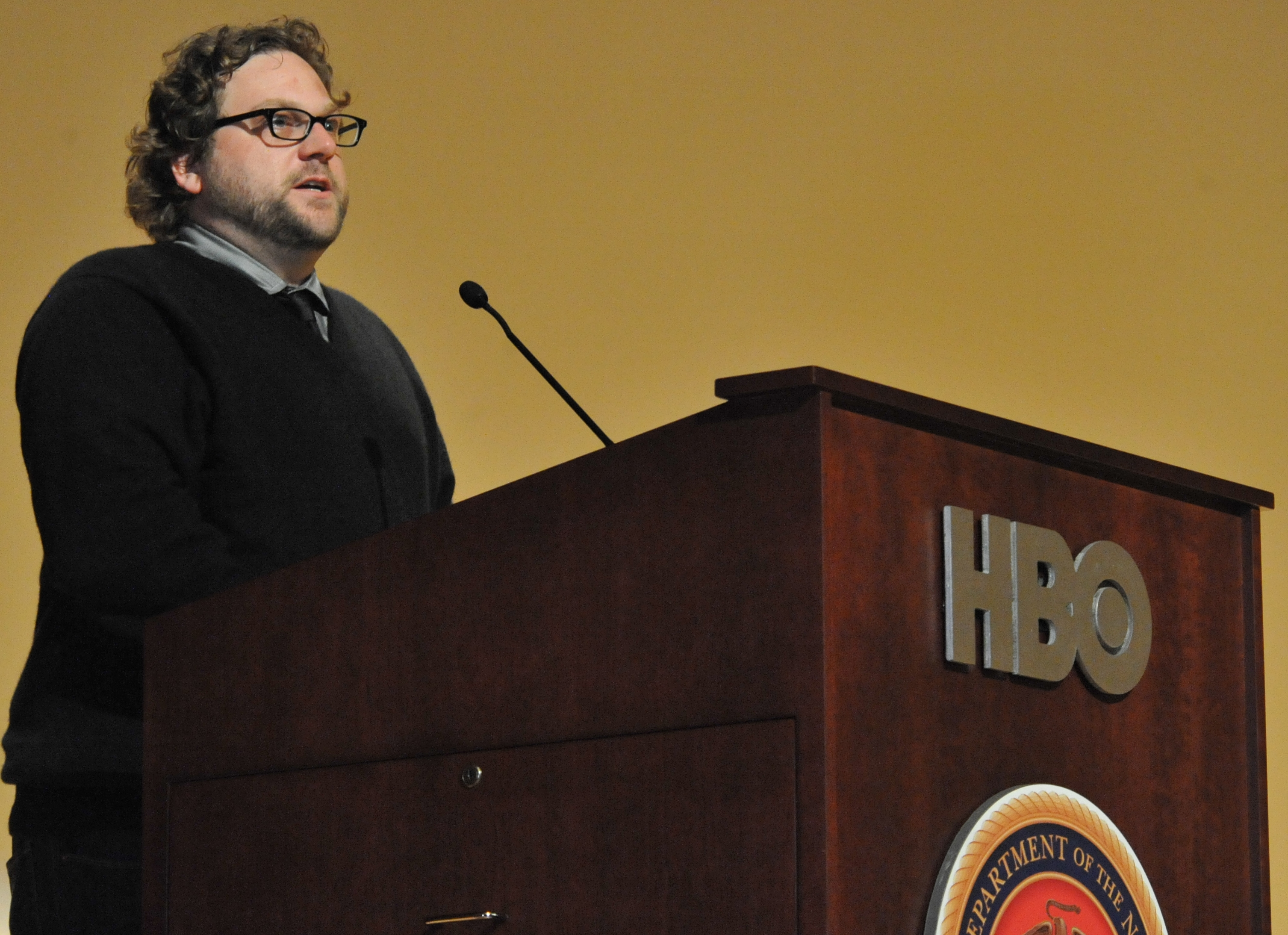
Katz speaking before the premiere of Taking Chance, which he directed, in February 2009

Prior to becoming a producer, Katz was a commercial rock DJ on 94 WYSP FM in Philadelphia. He got his start in movies working as a grip on Quentin Tarantino’s Reservoir Dogs, then interned at Good Machine eventually becoming Ted Hope's assistant. Hope encouraged Katz to try his hand at producing, and his first effort was Jim Fall's Trick. The film was one of the early independents to explore homosexual cinema treated as romantic comedy.

Next he co-executive produced, along with Ted Hope & Anne Carey, an HBO television mini-series of Moisés Kaufman’s play The Laramie Project. The mini-series version of The Laramie Project was adapted by Kaufman and members of New York's Tectonic Theater Project who went to Laramie, Wyoming after the murder of Matthew Shepard. The piece is based on more than 200 interviews they conducted while there. It follows and in some cases re-enacts the chronology of Shepherd's visit to a local bar, his kidnap and beating, the discovery of him tied to a fence, the vigil at the hospital, his death and funeral, and the trial of his homophobic killers. The mini-series mixes real news reports with actors portraying friends, family, cops, killers, and other Laramie residents in their own words. It concludes, one year after Shephard's death, with a Laramie staging of Tony Kushner's Angels in America.

Katz went on to co-produce two Academy Award Best Picture nominees; Todd Field's In the Bedroom and Sofia Coppola’s Lost in Translation.

In 2009 Katz returned to HBO for another real-life story Taking Chance. This was his directorial debut and was praised by television critics for its "reverence and sensitivity" to the men in uniform. Based on a true story, the brief film — it runs less than 90 minutes — follows the journey of a fallen U.S. Marine, 19-year-old Lance Cpl. Chance Phelps, as his body makes its way across the country accompanied by a Marine escort, Lt. Col. Michael Strobl (Kevin Bacon). Strobl wrote about the experience in 2004 and his journal entry has been e-mailed and posted online, where it gained an avid following (read it at ChancePhelps.org). He was nominated for an Emmy and co-won the WGA Award (TV) in Long Form adaptation at the Writers Guild of America Awards 2009 with Michael Strobl.

Katz has had three films in competition at the Sundance Film Festival and was invited to join the Academy of Motion Picture Arts and Sciences (producers branch) in 2005.

== Filmography ==
As director

- 2009 - Taking Chance
- 2014 - Adult Beginners
- 2016 - The Choice
- TBA - A Little More Alive

== Awards and nominations ==
- Academy Award
  - Nominated: Best Picture - In the Bedroom (shared with Todd Field and Graham Leader)
  - Nominated: Best Picture - Lost in Translation (shared with Sofia Coppola)
- BAFTA Award
  - Nominated: Best Film - Lost in Translation (shared with Sofia Coppola)
