= 16th Screen Actors Guild Awards =

- Awarded for: Outstanding motion picture and primetime television performances
- Date: January 23, 2010
- Location: Shrine Auditorium; Los Angeles, California
- Country: United States
- Presented by: Screen Actors Guild
- Website: www.sagawards.org

Television/radio coverage
- Network: TNT and TBS simultaneous broadcast

The 16th Annual Screen Actors Guild Awards, honoring the best achievements in film and television performances for the year 2009, were presented on January 23, 2010, at the Shrine Exposition Center in Los Angeles, California, for the fourteenth consecutive year. It was broadcast live simultaneously by TNT and TBS.

The nominees were announced on December 17, 2009, by Michelle Monaghan and Chris O'Donnell at Los Angeles' Pacific Design Center's Silver Screen Theater.

== Winners and nominees ==
Winners are listed first and highlighted in boldface.

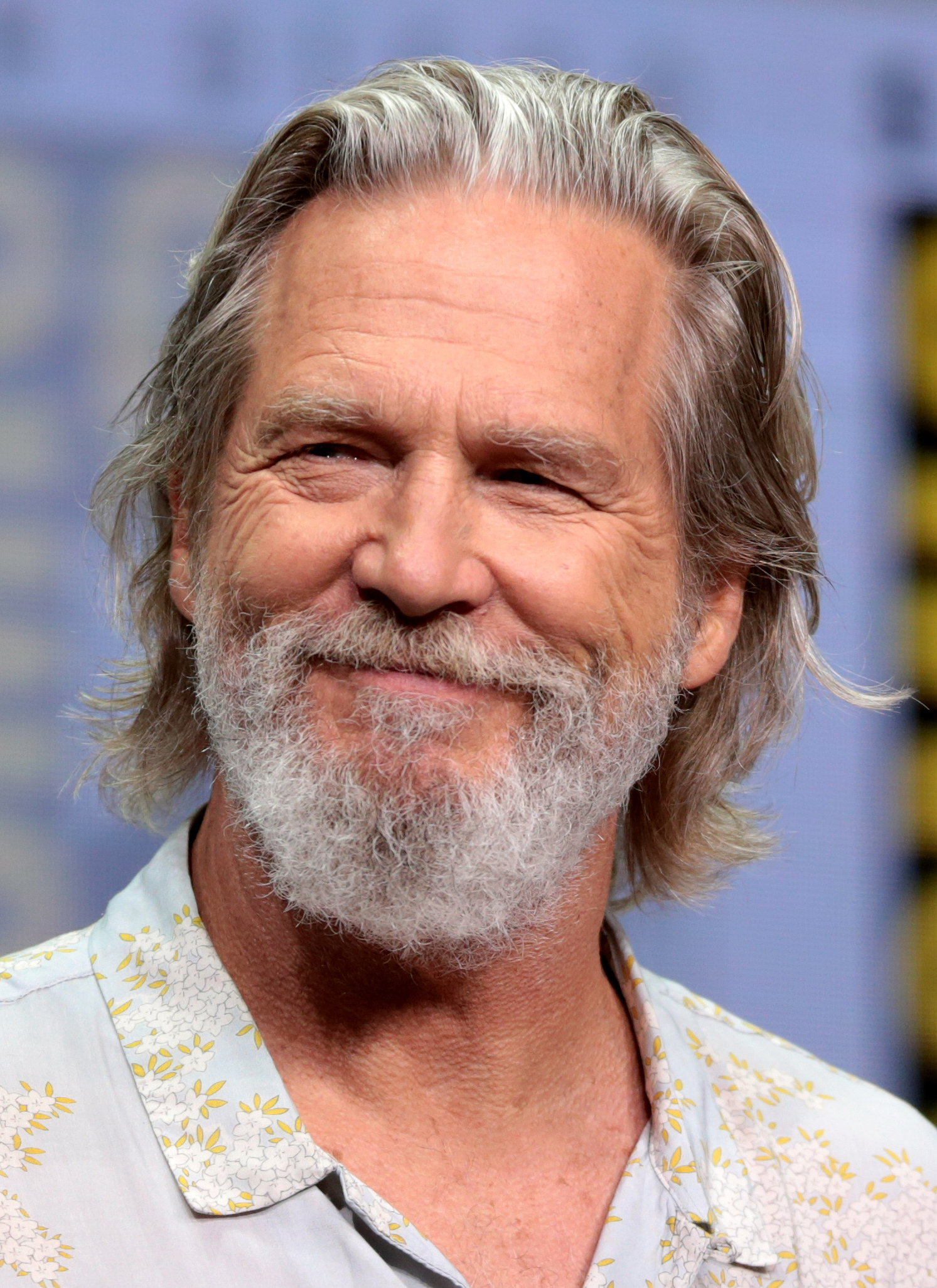
Jeff Bridges, Outstanding Performance by a Male Actor in a Leading Role winner

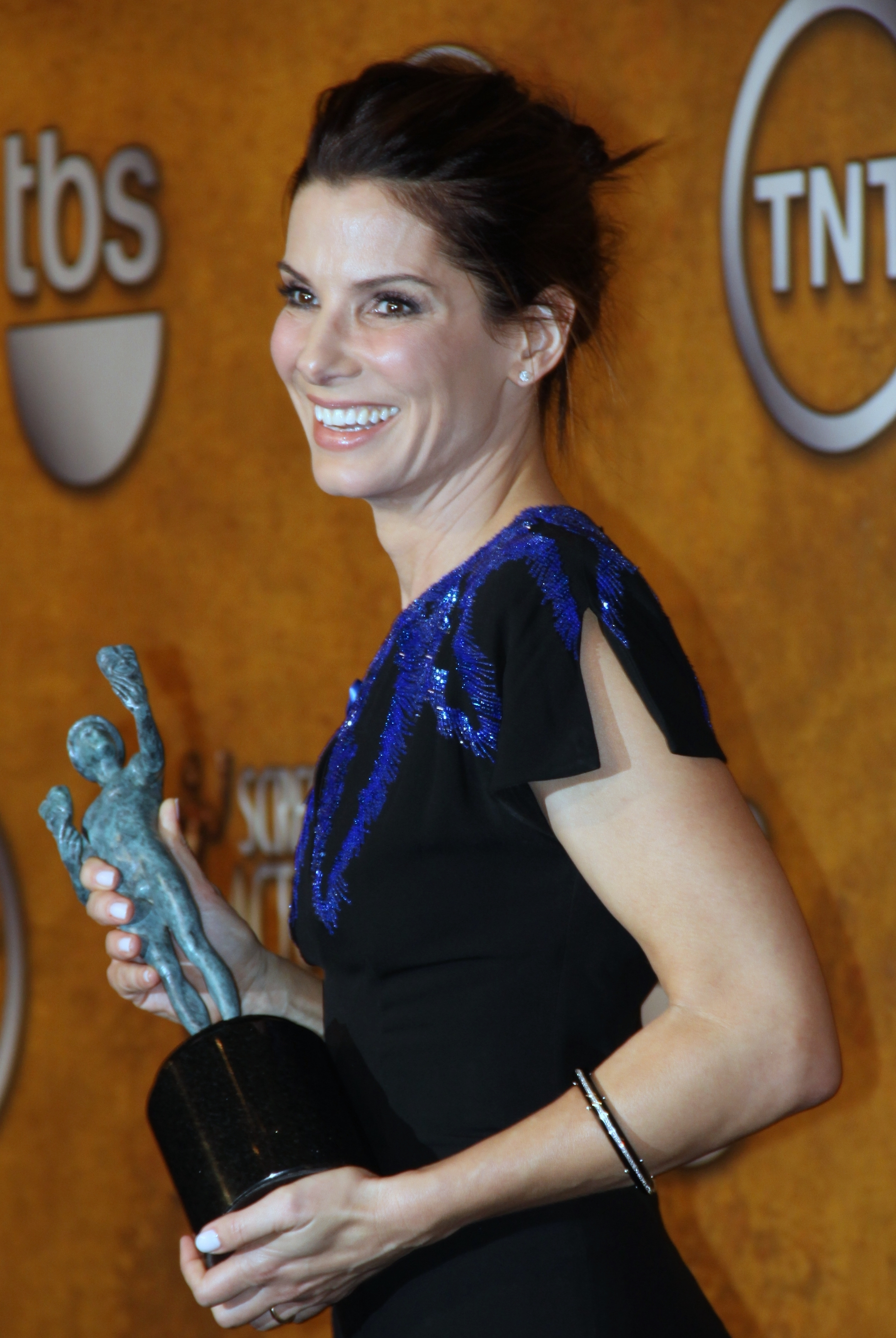
Sandra Bullock, Outstanding Performance by a Female Actor in a Leading Role winner

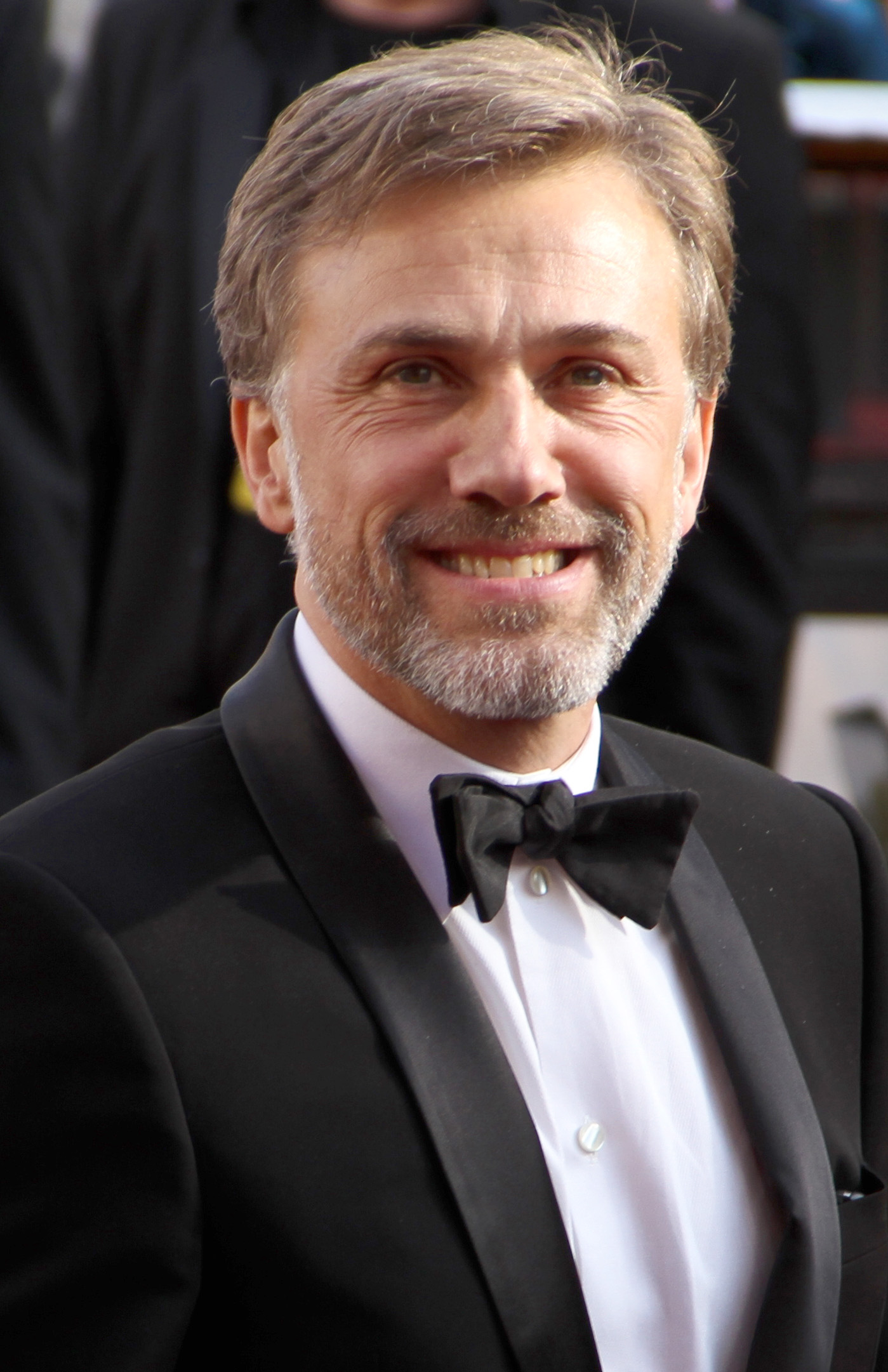
Christoph Waltz, Outstanding Performance by a Male Actor in a Supporting Role winner

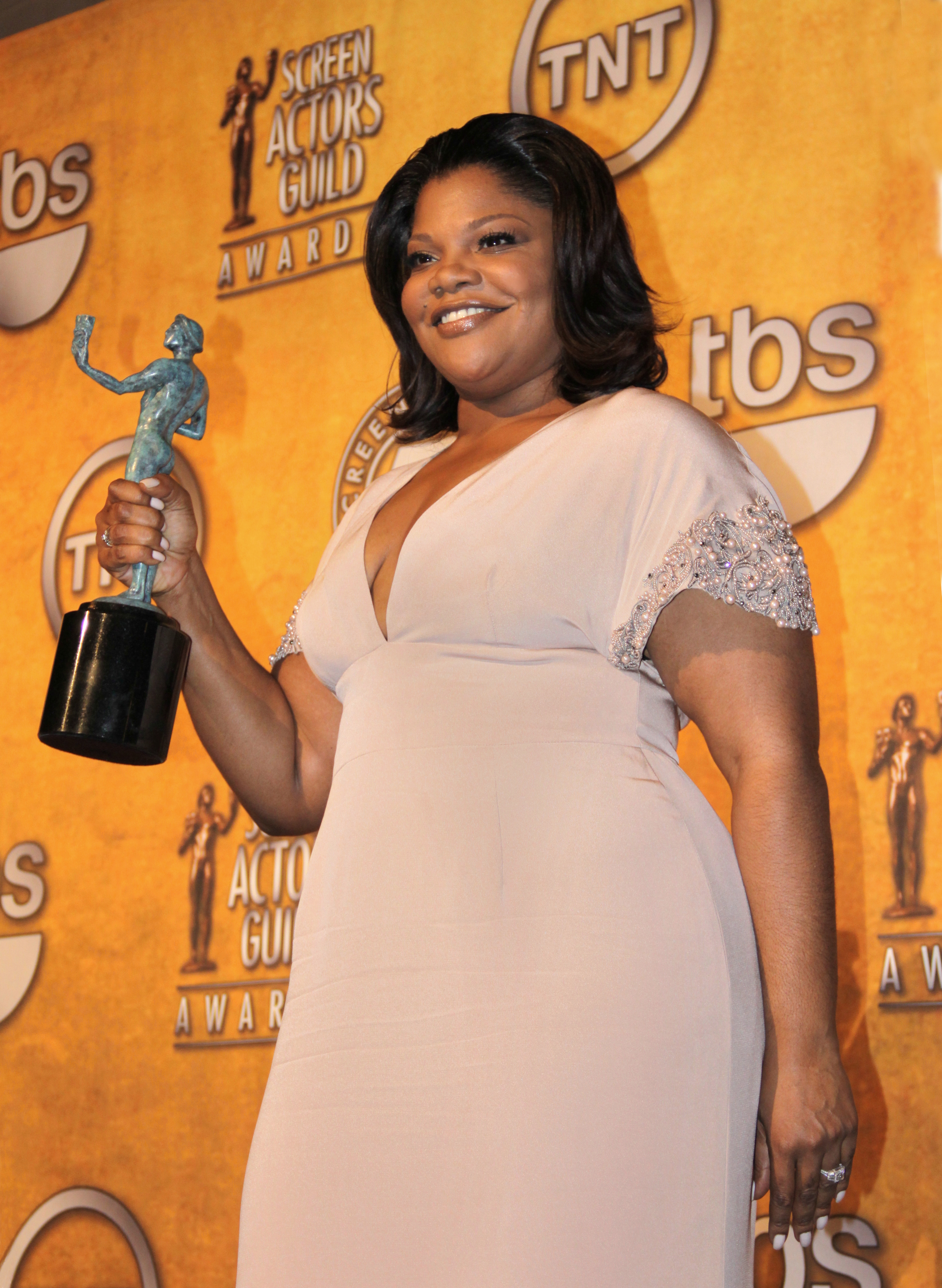
Mo'Nique, Outstanding Performance by a Female Actor in a Supporting Role winner

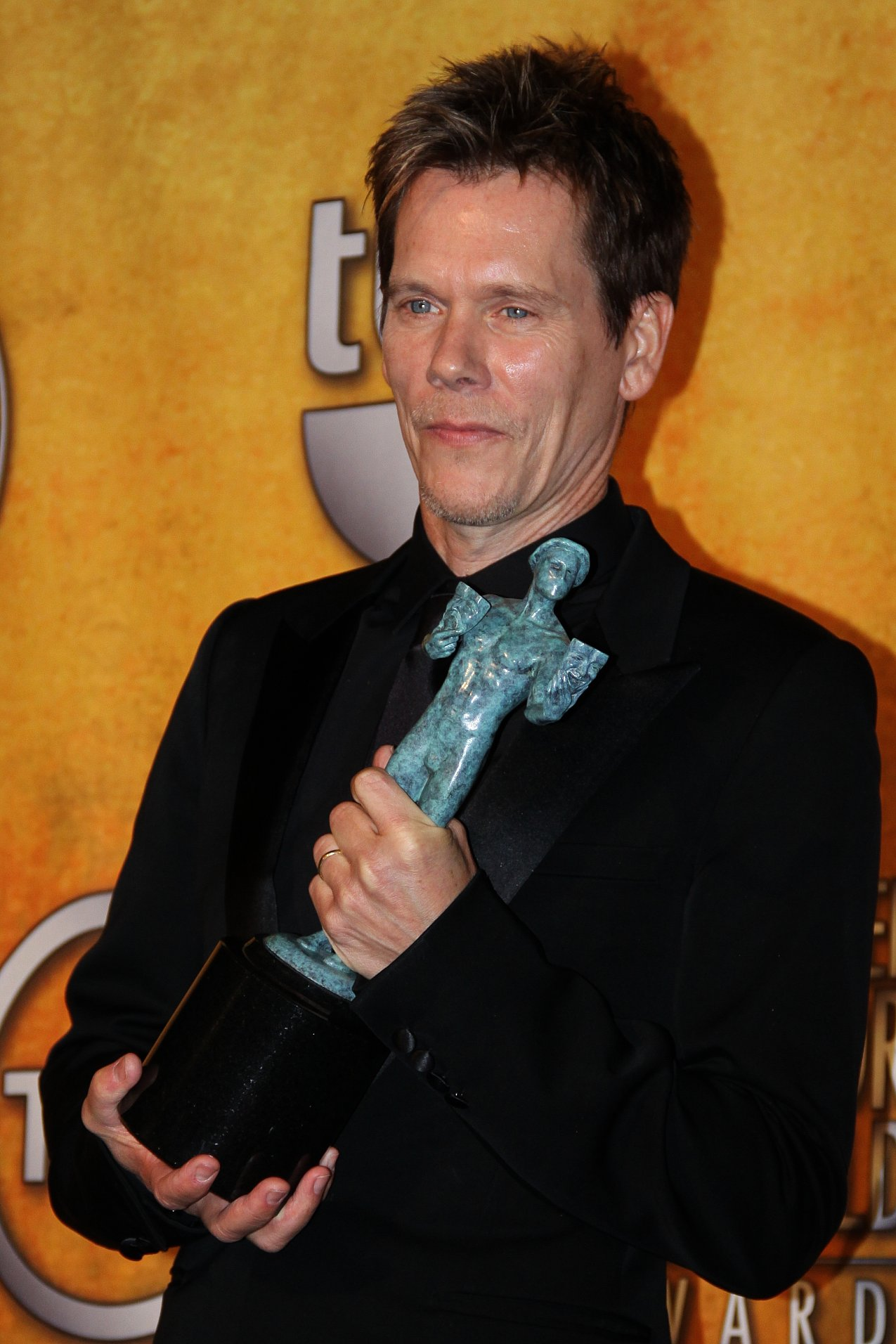
Kevin Bacon, Outstanding Performance by a Male Actor in a Miniseries or Television Movie winner

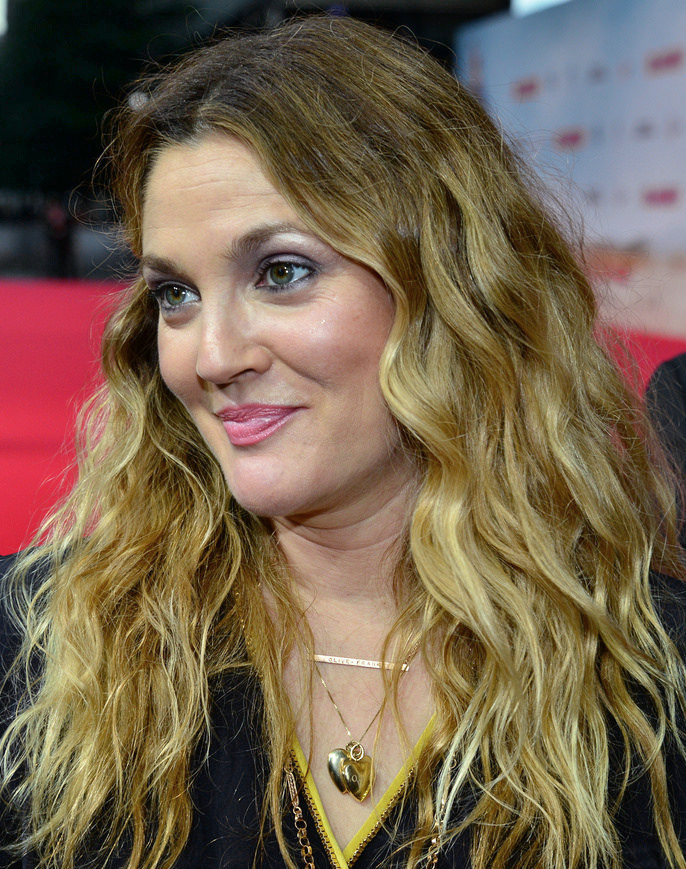
Drew Barrymore, Outstanding Performance by a Female Actor in a Miniseries or Television Movie winner

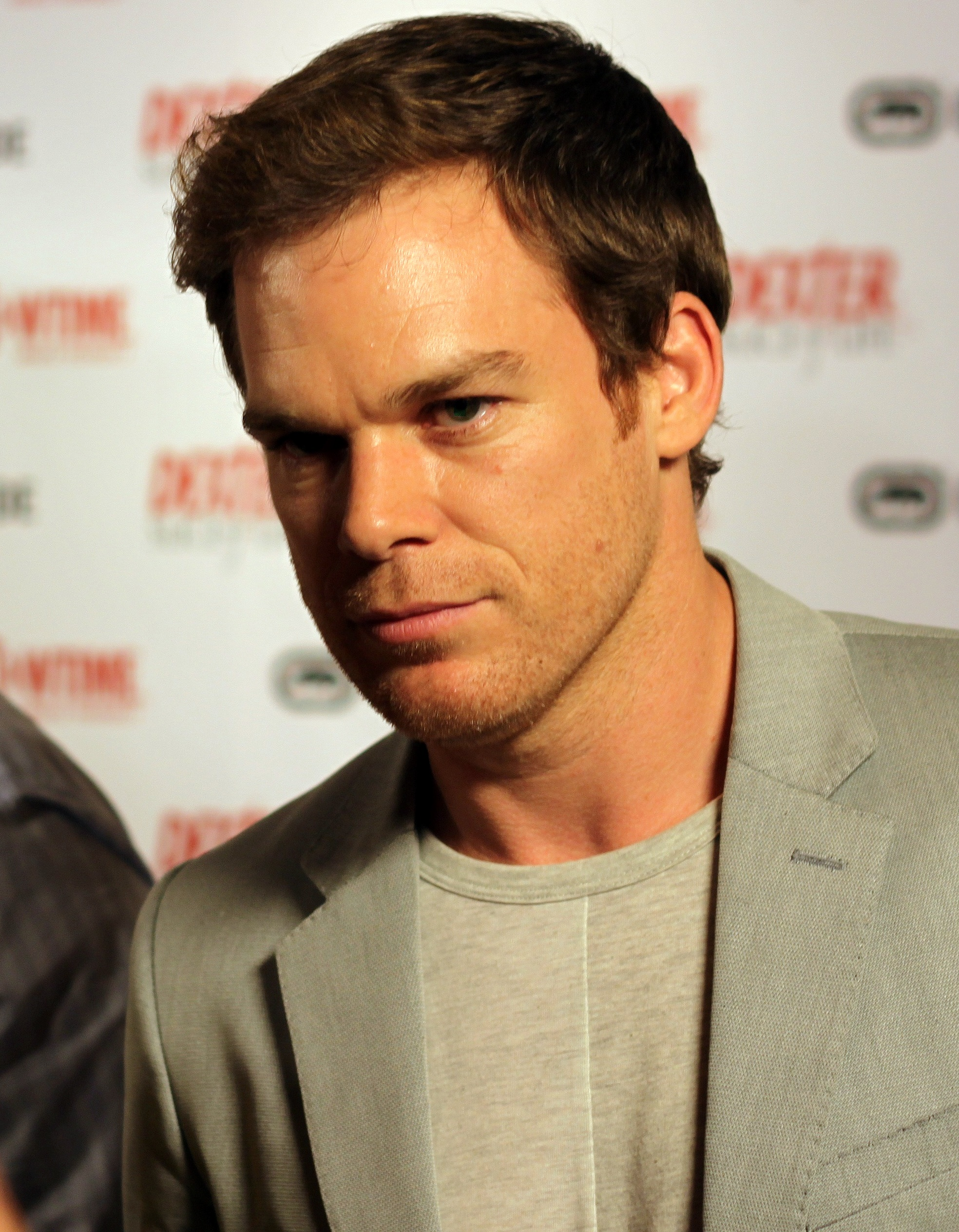
Michael C. Hall, Outstanding Performance by a Male Actor in a Drama Series winner

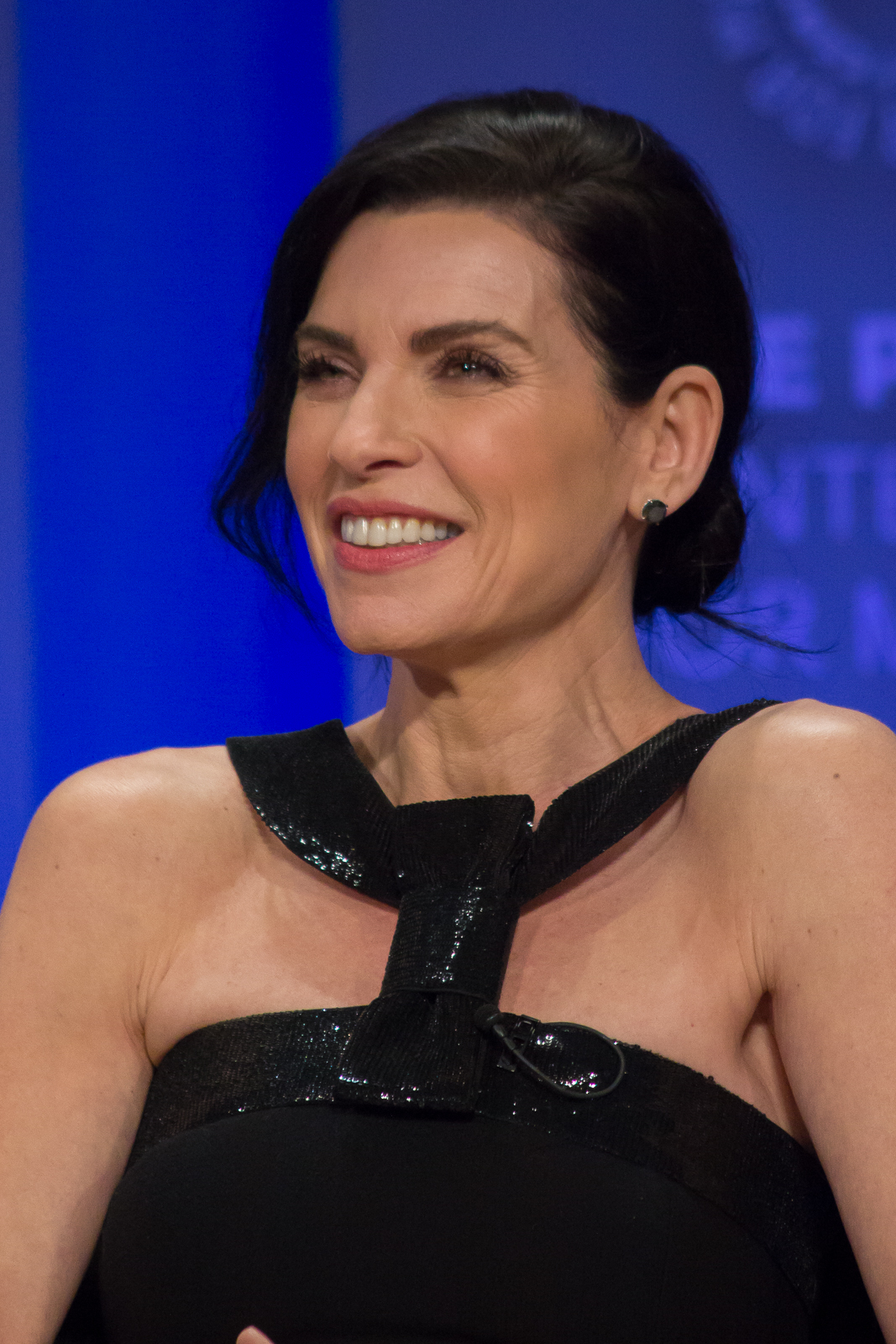
Julianna Margulies, Outstanding Performance by a Female Actor in a Drama Series winner

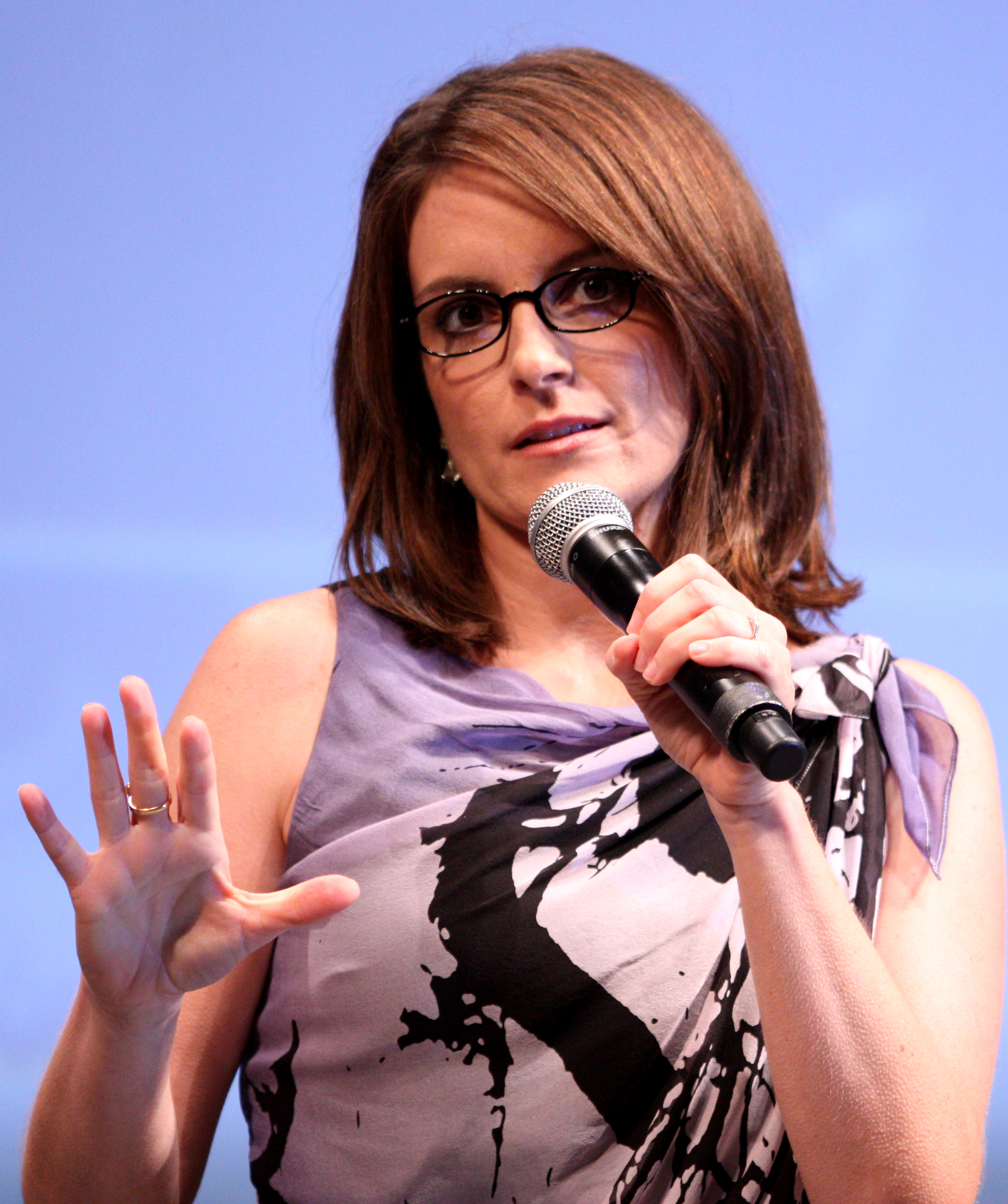
Tina Fey, Outstanding Performance by a Female Actor in a Comedy Series winner

=== Film ===
| Outstanding Performance by a Male Actor in a Leading Role | Outstanding Performance by a Female Actor in a Leading Role |
|---|---|
| **Jeff Bridges – Crazy Heart as Otis "Bad" Blake**; George Clooney – Up in the Air as Ryan Bingham; Colin Firth – A Single Man as George Falconer; Morgan Freeman – Invictus as Nelson Mandela; Jeremy Renner – The Hurt Locker as Sgt. First Class William James | **Sandra Bullock – The Blind Side as Leigh Anne Tuohy**; Helen Mirren – The Last Station as Sofya Tolstoy; Carey Mulligan – An Education as Jenny Miller; Gabourey Sidibe – Precious: Based on the Novel 'Push' by Sapphire as Claireece "Precious" Jones; Meryl Streep – Julie & Julia as Julia Child |
| Outstanding Performance by a Male Actor in a Supporting Role | Outstanding Performance by a Female Actor in a Supporting Role |
| **Christoph Waltz – Inglourious Basterds as Col. Hans Landa**; Matt Damon – Invictus as Francois Pienaar; Woody Harrelson – The Messenger as Cpt. Tony Stone; Christopher Plummer – The Last Station as Leo Tolstoy; Stanley Tucci – The Lovely Bones as George Harvey | **Mo'Nique – Precious: Based on the Novel 'Push' by Sapphire as Mary Lee Johnston**; Penélope Cruz – Nine as Carla Albanese; Vera Farmiga – Up in the Air as Alex Goran; Anna Kendrick – Up in the Air as Natalie Keener; Diane Kruger – Inglourious Basterds as Bridget von Hammersmark |
Outstanding Performance by a Cast in a Motion Picture
**Inglourious Basterds – Daniel Brühl, August Diehl, Julie Dreyfus, Michael Fassbender, Sylvester Groth, Jacky Ido, Diane Kruger, Mélanie Laurent, Denis Ménochet, Mike Myers, Brad Pitt, Eli Roth, Til Schweiger, Rod Taylor, Christoph Waltz, and Martin Wuttke**; An Education – Dominic Cooper, Alfred Molina, Carey Mulligan, Rosamund Pike, Peter Sarsgaard, Emma Thompson, and Olivia Williams; The Hurt Locker – Christian Camargo, Brian Geraghty, Evangeline Lilly, Anthony Mackie, and Jeremy Renner; Nine – Marion Cotillard, Penélope Cruz, Daniel Day-Lewis, Judi Dench, Fergie, Kate Hudson, Nicole Kidman, and Sophia Loren; Precious: Based on the Novel 'Push' by Sapphire – Mariah Carey, Lenny Kravitz, Mo'Nique, Paula Patton, Sherri Shepherd, and Gabourey Sidibe
Outstanding Performance by a Stunt Ensemble in a Motion Picture
**Star Trek**; Public Enemies; Transformers: Revenge of the Fallen

=== Television ===
| Outstanding Performance by a Male Actor in a Miniseries or Television Movie | Outstanding Performance by a Female Actor in a Miniseries or Television Movie |
|---|---|
| **Kevin Bacon – Taking Chance (HBO) as Lt. Col. Mike Strobl**; Cuba Gooding Jr. – Gifted Hands: The Ben Carson Story (TNT) as Ben Carson; Jeremy Irons – Georgia O'Keeffe (Lifetime) as Alfred Stieglitz; Kevin Kline – Great Performances: Cyrano de Bergerac (PBS) as Cyrano de Bergerac; Tom Wilkinson – A Number (HBO) as Salter | **Drew Barrymore – Grey Gardens (HBO) as "Little" Edith Bouvier Beale**; Joan Allen – Georgia O'Keeffe (Lifetime) as Georgia O'Keeffe; Ruby Dee – America (Lifetime) as Mrs. Harper; Jessica Lange – Grey Gardens (HBO) as "Big" Edith Bovier Beale; Sigourney Weaver – Prayers for Bobby (Lifetime) as Mary Griffith |
| Outstanding Performance by a Male Actor in a Drama Series | Outstanding Performance by a Female Actor in a Drama Series |
| **Michael C. Hall – Dexter (Showtime) as Dexter Morgan**; Simon Baker – The Mentalist (CBS) as Patrick Jane; Bryan Cranston – Breaking Bad (AMC) as Walter White; Jon Hamm – Mad Men (AMC) as Don Draper; Hugh Laurie – House (Fox) as Dr. Gregory House | **Julianna Margulies – The Good Wife (CBS) as Alicia Florrick**; Patricia Arquette – Medium (CBS) as Allison DuBois; Glenn Close – Damages (FX) as Patty Hewes; Mariska Hargitay – Law & Order: Special Victims Unit (NBC) as Det. Olivia Benson; Holly Hunter – Saving Grace (TNT) as Grace Hanadarko; Kyra Sedgwick – The Closer (TNT) as Det. Brenda Leigh Johnson |
| Outstanding Performance by a Male Actor in a Comedy Series | Outstanding Performance by a Female Actor in a Comedy Series |
| **Alec Baldwin – 30 Rock (NBC) as Jack Donaghy**; Steve Carell – The Office (NBC) as Michael Scott; Larry David – Curb Your Enthusiasm (HBO) as himself; Tony Shalhoub – Monk (USA Network) as Adrian Monk; Charlie Sheen – Two and a Half Men (CBS) as Charlie Harper | **Tina Fey – 30 Rock (NBC) as Liz Lemon**; Christina Applegate – Samantha Who? (ABC) as Samantha Newly; Toni Collette – United States of Tara (Showtime) as Tara Gregson; Edie Falco – Nurse Jackie (Showtime) as Jackie Peyton; Julia Louis-Dreyfus – The New Adventures of Old Christine (CBS) as Christine Campbell |
Outstanding Performance by an Ensemble in a Drama Series
**Mad Men (AMC)** – Alexa Alemanni, Bryan Batt, Jared Gilmore, Michael Gladis, Jon Hamm, Jared Harris, Christina Hendricks, January Jones, Vincent Kartheiser, Robert Morse, Elisabeth Moss, Kiernan Shipka, John Slattery, Rich Sommer, Christopher Stanley, and Aaron Staton; The Closer (TNT) – G. W. Bailey, Michael Paul Chan, Raymond Cruz, Tony Denison, Robert Gossett, Phillip P. Keene, Corey Reynolds, Kyra Sedgwick, J. K. Simmons, and Jon Tenney; Dexter (Showtime) – Preston Bailey, Julie Benz, Jennifer Carpenter, Brando Eaton, Courtney Ford, Michael C. Hall, Desmond Harrington, C. S. Lee, John Lithgow, Rick Peters, James Remar, Christina Robinson, Lauren Vélez, and David Zayas; The Good Wife (CBS) – Christine Baranski, Josh Charles, Matt Czuchry, Julianna Margulies, Archie Panjabi, Graham Phillips, and Makenzie Vega; True Blood (HBO) – Chris Bauer, Mehcad Brooks, Anna Camp, Nelsan Ellis, Michelle Forbes, Mariana Klaveno, Ryan Kwanten, Todd Lowe, Michael McMillian, Stephen Moyer, Anna Paquin, Jim Parrack, Carrie Preston, William Sanderson, Alexander Skarsgård, Sam Trammell, Rutina Wesley, and Deborah Ann Woll
Outstanding Performance by an Ensemble in a Comedy Series
**Glee (Fox)** – Dianna Agron, Chris Colfer, Patrick Gallagher, Jessalyn Gilsig, Jane Lynch, Jayma Mays, Kevin McHale, Lea Michele, Cory Monteith, Heather Morris, Matthew Morrison, Amber Riley, Naya Rivera, Mark Salling, Harry Shum Jr., Josh Sussman, Dijon Talton, Iqbal Theba, and Jenna Ushkowitz; 30 Rock (NBC) – Scott Adsit, Alec Baldwin, Katrina Bowden, Kevin Brown, Grizz Chapman, Tina Fey, Judah Friedlander, Jane Krakowski, John Lutz, Jack McBrayer, Tracy Morgan, and Keith Powell; Curb Your Enthusiasm (HBO) – Larry David, Susie Essman, Jeff Garlin, and Cheryl Hines; Modern Family (ABC) – Julie Bowen, Ty Burrell, Jesse Tyler Ferguson, Nolan Gould, Sarah Hyland, Ed O'Neill, Rico Rodriguez, Eric Stonestreet, Sofia Vergara, and Ariel Winter; The Office (NBC) – Leslie David Baker, Brian Baumgartner, Creed Bratton, Steve Carell, Jenna Fischer, Kate Flannery, Ed Helms, Mindy Kaling, Ellie Kemper, Angela Kinsey, John Krasinski, Paul Lieberstein, B. J. Novak, Oscar Nuñez, Craig Robinson, Phyllis Smith, and Rainn Wilson
Outstanding Performance by a Stunt Ensemble in a Television Series
**24 (Fox)**; The Closer (TNT); Dexter (Showtime); Heroes (NBC); The Unit (CBS)

=== Screen Actors Guild Life Achievement Award ===
- Betty White

== Multiple nominations ==
=== Film ===
| Nominations | Film |
|---|---|
| 3 | Inglourious Basterds |
| 3 | Precious: Based on the Novel 'Push' by Sapphire |
| 3 | Up in the Air |
| 2 | An Education |
| 2 | The Hurt Locker |
| 2 | Invictus |
| 2 | The Last Station |
| 2 | Nine |

=== Television ===
| Nominations | Program |
|---|---|
| 3 | 30 Rock |
| 3 | The Closer |
| 3 | Dexter |
| 2 | Curb Your Enthusiasm |
| 2 | Georgia O'Keeffe |
| 2 | The Good Wife |
| 2 | Grey Gardens |
| 2 | Mad Men |
| 2 | The Office |

== Multiple wins ==
=== Film ===
| Wins | Film |
|---|---|
| 2 | Inglourious Basterds |

=== Television ===
| Wins | Program |
|---|---|
| 2 | 30 Rock |

== In Memoriam ==
Sigourney Weaver introduced the "In Memoriam" segment which honored:

- Natasha Richardson
- Monte Hale
- Henry Gibson
- Betsy Blair
- Robert Ginty
- Ed McMahon
- Philip Carey
- Dom DeLuise
- Brittany Murphy
- Carl Ballantine
- Ron Silver
- Dennis Cole
- John Quade
- Richard Todd
- Fred Travalena
- Cheryl Holdridge
- Joseph Wiseman
- Arnold Stang
- Gene Barry
- Collin Wilcox Paxton
- Farrah Fawcett
- Russ Conway
- Soupy Sales
- Gale Storm
- Steven Gilborn
- Lou Jacobi
- Dick Durock
- Michael Jackson
- Wayne Tippit
- Harve Presnell
- Alaina Reed Hall
- James Whitmore
- Jim Hutchison
- Karl Malden
- Paul Burke
- Edward Woodward
- Frank Aletter
- Bea Arthur
- David Carradine
- Jennifer Jones
- Patrick Swayze
