= Taking Chance =

2009 television film directed by Ross Katz

- Official film poster
- Genre: Historical drama
- Written by: Michael Strobl; Ross Katz
- Directed by: Ross Katz
- Starring: Kevin Bacon
- Composer: Marcelo Zarvos
- Country of origin: United States
- Original language: English

Production
- Executive producers: Brad Krevoy; Cathy Wischner-Sola; Ross Katz
- Producer: Lori Keith Douglas
- Cinematography: Alar Kivilo
- Editors: Lee Percy; Brian A. Kates
- Running time: 77 minutes
- Production companies: Civil Dawn Pictures; Motion Picture Corporation of America

Original release
- Network: HBO
- Release: January 16, 2009

Taking Chance is a 2009 American historical drama television film directed by Ross Katz, from a screenplay by U.S. Marine Lieutenant Colonel, Retired Michael Strobl and Katz, based on the journal of the same title kept by Strobl, who also served as military consultant. Kevin Bacon's portrayal won him a Golden Globe Award for Best Actor – Miniseries or Television Film and a Screen Actors Guild Award for Outstanding Performance by a Male Actor in a Miniseries or Television Movie, among others.

Taking Chance premiered at the Sundance Film Festival on January 16, 2009, and aired on HBO in the United States on February 21, 2009. The film received generally favorable reviews from critics. At the 61st Primetime Emmy Awards, it earned ten nominations, such as Outstanding Television Movie and Outstanding Lead Actor in a Miniseries or Movie for Bacon, and won one for Outstanding Single-Camera Picture Editing for a Miniseries or a Movie.

== Plot ==
The movie is based on the recollections of U.S. Marine Lieutenant Colonel Michael Strobl. Strobl becomes self-reflective about his duties assigned to the task of the funeral arrangements for deceased soldiers in contrast to ambitions of active duty in warfare for which he joined the Corps. He decides that he will take the assignment of looking after the remains of Private First Class even though military protocol would normally assign an NCO (Non-Commissioned Officer) to such an assignment. He escorted the remains of fallen Marine Private First Class Chance Phelps (posthumously promoted to Lance Corporal) from Dover Air Force Base to Dubois, Wyoming.

Phelps was fatally wounded by gunfire on April 9, 2004 near Baghdad during the Iraq War at approximately 1:30 p.m. (Arabian Standard Time), which was presented by audio only at the beginning of the film. Immediately following the audio, two United States Marine Corps casualty assistance calls officers (Sergeant Burton and Major Mike Thompson) wearing their Class A dress blues uniforms silently drive from Salt Lake City, Utah to Dubois, Wyoming during the late night and pre-dawn morning hours. Thompson and Burton arrive at the house of Phelps' mother to notify her and Phelps' stepfather at 2:00 a.m. (Mountain Standard Time) on April 10, 2004, even though they are only seen walking in slow cadence up to and knocking on the front door, despite the actual names of the casualty assistance calls officers not being publicly disclosed. Strobl is first seen scanning the list of Iraq War casualties on the Department of Defense website, where he learns of Phelps' death and notices he previously resided in Strobl's hometown of Clifton, Colorado. This motivates Strobl to volunteer to escort Phelps from the Dover Air Force Base mortuary to his final resting place of Dubois Cemetery. Strobl attended both Phelps's funeral and his memorial service, meeting Major Thompson, as well as discovering that Phelps was an exceptional Marine and well-liked by his fellow Marines. After drinks at the local Veterans club, he confides to the ranking veteran in charge there that he harbors envy for the active duty that Phelps experienced in the field. The ranking veteran tells him to reconsider his words, and that the duty he performs for the grieving families is a high honor which he may have underestimated. Strobl reflects on the ranking veteran's words, meets Phelps' family (which includes Phelps' mother Gretchen Phelps Mack, father John Phelps, sister Navy Petty Officer Kelly Phelps, stepfather Jeff Mack, stepmother Chris Phelps, and Kelly's fiancé Army Sergeant Robert Ordoff) to return Phelps' personal items, fulfills his duty of managing the last remains of a fallen Marine, before he returns home to his wife Stacey, daughter Olivia, and son Nate. Finally, a tribute to Phelps is shown through pictures and videos of him prior to his tragic loss at the film's conclusion.

Strobl later wrote an essay about the entire experience, the emotions he felt, and the people he met. It was published in the blog Blackfive on April 23, 2004 and shared widely on the Internet.

== Cast ==
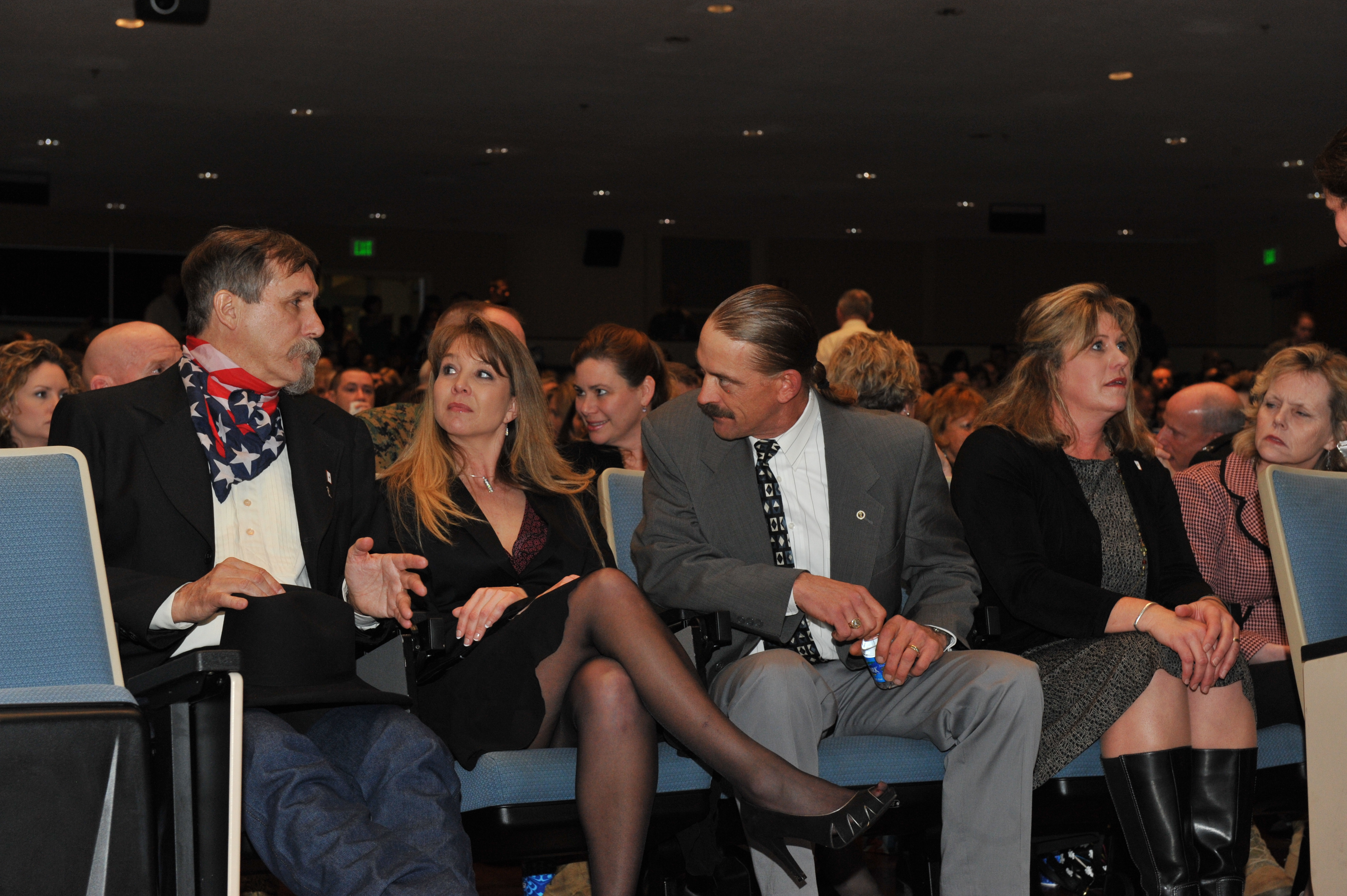
Family members of Chance Phelps attend the Virginia premiere in February 2009.

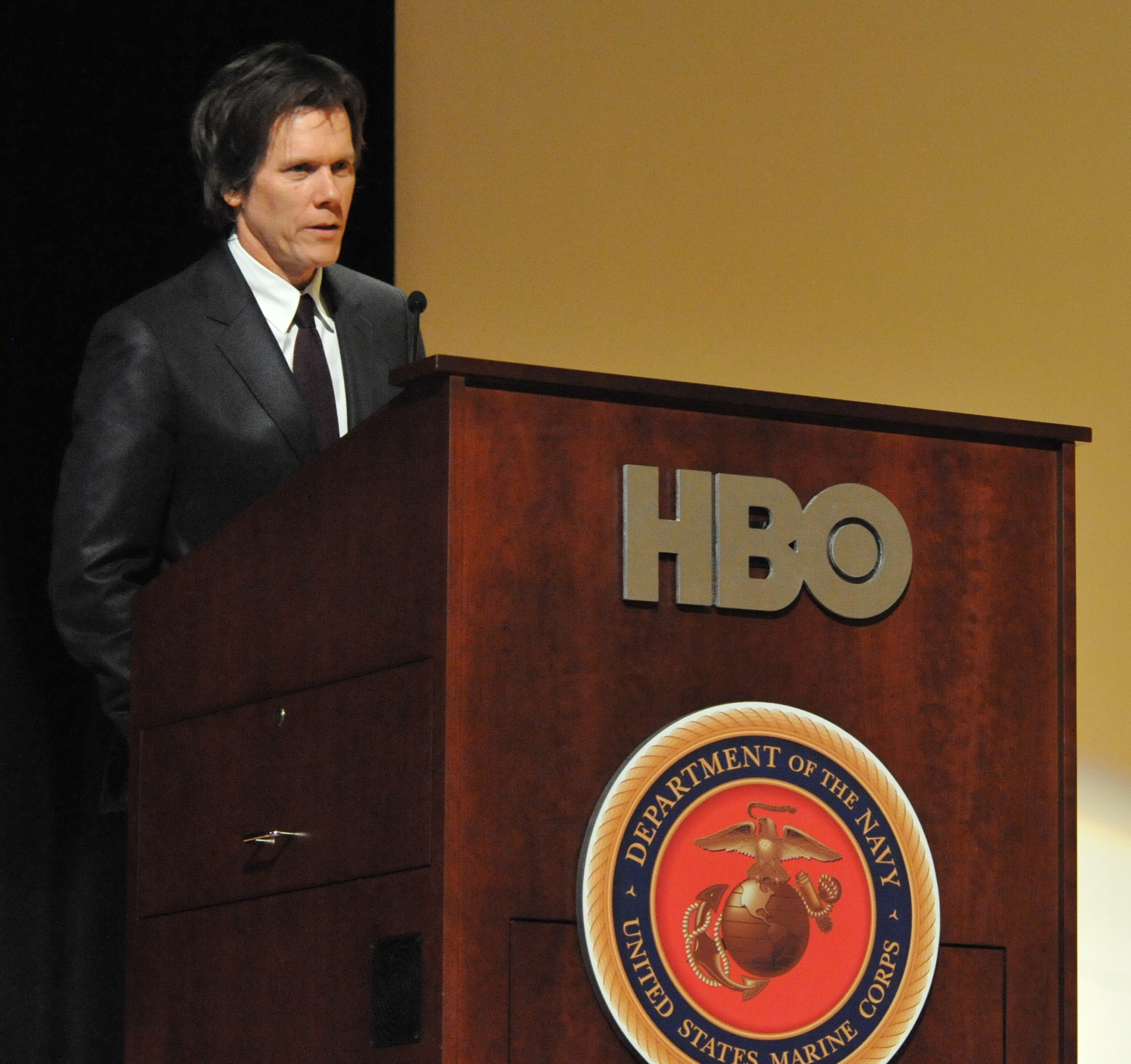
Kevin Bacon speaking before the premiere

- Kevin Bacon as Lieutenant Colonel Michael Strobl
- Nicholas Reese Art as Nate Strobl
- Blanche Baker as Chris Phelps
- Tom Bloom as Navy Chaplain
- Guy Boyd as Gary Hargrove
- James Castanien as Sergeant Robert Orndoff
- Gordon Clapp as Capt. Tom Garrett
- Mike Colter as Master Gunnery Sergeant Demetry
- Henry Coy as Sergeant Burton (credited as Marine Driver)
- Joel de la Fuente as Ticketing Agent
- Liza Colón-Zayás as Ticketing Agent
- Ann Dowd as Gretchen Phelps Mack
- Tate Ellington as A.V. Scott
- Noah Fleiss as Army Sergeant
- Julian Gamble as Jeff Mack
- Tom Aldredge as Charlie Fitts
- Enver Gjokaj as Corporal Arenz ('Sergeant' in film's dialogue)
- Brendan Griffin as Major Mike Thompson
- Adam Hayes as Dover Team Leader
- Danny Hoch as TSA Agent
- Ruby Jerins as Olivia Strobl
- Tom Kemp as Business Man
- John Bedford Lloyd as General Kruger
- John Magaro as Rich Brewer
- Matthew Morrison as Robert Rouse
- Maximilian Osinski as Sergeant Neuman
- Wolé Parks as Major Schott
- Del Pentecost as Minneapolis Cargo Handler
- Dominic Colon as Minneapolis Cargo Handler
- George Rabidou as Marine First Sergeant delivering U.S. Flag to parent during funeral.
- Christina Rouner as Tall Flight Attendant
- Victor Slezak as Sergeant Mulcahy
- Felix Solis as Philly Cargo Worker
- Steven Hand as Philly Cargo Worker
- Sarah Thompson as Annie
- Paige Turco as Stacey Strobl
- Sharon Washington as Mortuary Technician
- Julie White as Colonel Karen Bell
- Emily Wickersham as Petty Officer Kelley Phelps
- William Wise as Larry Hertzog
- Tom Wopat as John Phelps
- Richard Reed as Rifle Detail Staff Non Commissioned Officer

== Critical reception ==
Taking Chance received generally favorable reviews. On Metacritic it has a score of 76 out of 100 based on 16 reviews. Review aggregator Rotten Tomatoes gave it a 57% rating based on reviews from 7 critics.

One review from The Baltimore Sun, said that it "... is one of the most eloquent and socially conscious films the premium cable channel has ever presented," and USA Today, said "A small, almost perfectly realized gem of a movie, Taking Chance is also precisely the kind of movie that TV should be making." On the other end is Slant Magazine, saying "Instead of well-drawn characters or real human drama, we are presented with a military procedural on burial traditions. The film desperately wants the viewer to shed tears for its fallen hero without giving a single dramatic reason to do so."

The film was the most-watched HBO original in five years, with over two million viewers on the opening night, and more than 5.5 million on re-airings. Critics often attribute this success to its apolitical nature, not directly depicting nor offering an opinion of the Iraq War.

Former Secretary of Defense Robert Gates wrote in his 2014 memoir Duty: Memoirs of a Secretary at War that the film had an "important impact" on his decision to allow the media access to the transfer of fallen service members at Dover Air Force Base in February 2009. During a White House press conference in 2017, former White House Chief of Staff and Retired Marine Corps General John F. Kelly, who was next to Chance when he was killed and is the father of First Lieutenant Robert Kelly who was killed in action in Afghanistan, recommended that the Washington press corps watch the film in order to understand the solemnity and dignity of the process of returning fallen military service members to their families.

== Accolades ==
Year	Award	Category	Nominee(s)	Result	Ref.
2009	Humanitas Prize	90 Minute or Longer Network or Syndicated Television	Michael Strobl and Ross Katz	Won	
2009	Online Film & Television Association Awards	Best Motion Picture		Nominated	
2009	Online Film & Television Association Awards	Best Actor in a Motion Picture or Miniseries	Kevin Bacon	Nominated	
2009	Online Film & Television Association Awards	Best Direction of a Motion Picture or Miniseries	Ross Katz	Nominated	
2009	Online Film & Television Association Awards	Best Writing of a Motion Picture or Miniseries	Michael Strobl and Ross Katz	Nominated	
2009	Online Film & Television Association Awards	Best Editing in a Motion Picture or Miniseries		Nominated	
2009	Online Film & Television Association Awards	Best New Titles Sequence in a Series, Motion Picture or Miniseries		Nominated	
2009	Online Film & Television Association Awards	Best Production Design in a Motion Picture or Miniseries		Nominated	
2009	Online Film & Television Association Awards	Best Sound in a Motion Picture or Miniseries		Nominated	
2009	Primetime Emmy Awards	Outstanding Television Movie	Brad Krevoy, Cathy Wischner-Sola, Ross Katz, William Teitler, and Lori Keith Douglas	Nominated	
2009	Primetime Emmy Awards	Outstanding Lead Actor in a Miniseries or Movie	Kevin Bacon	Nominated	
2009	Primetime Emmy Awards	Outstanding Directing for a Miniseries or Movie	Ross Katz	Nominated	
2009	Primetime Emmy Awards	Outstanding Writing for a Miniseries or Movie	Michael Strobl and Ross Katz	Nominated	
2009	Primetime Creative Arts Emmy Awards	Outstanding Art Direction for a Miniseries or Movie	Dan Leigh, James Donahue, and Ron Von Blomberg	Nominated	
2009	Primetime Creative Arts Emmy Awards	Outstanding Main Title Design	Michael Riley, Dru Nget, Dan Meehan, and Bob Swensen	Nominated	
2009	Primetime Creative Arts Emmy Awards	Outstanding Music Composition for a Miniseries, Movie or Special (Original Dramatic Score)	Marcelo Zarvos	Nominated	
2009	Primetime Creative Arts Emmy Awards	Outstanding Single-Camera Picture Editing for a Miniseries or Movie	Lee Percy and Brian A. Kates	Won	
2009	Primetime Creative Arts Emmy Awards	Outstanding Sound Editing for a Miniseries, Movie or Special	Rickley Dumm, Frank Gaeta, David Grant, Tim Boggs, Catherine Harper, Chris Moriana, and Johnny Caruso	Nominated	
2009	Primetime Creative Arts Emmy Awards	Outstanding Sound Mixing for a Miniseries or Movie	T.J. O'Mara and Rick Ash	Nominated	
2009	Satellite Awards	Best Motion Picture Made for Television		Nominated	
2009	Satellite Awards	Best Actor in a Miniseries or Motion Picture Made for Television	Kevin Bacon	Nominated	
2009	Sundance Film Festival	Grand Jury Prize: Dramatic	Ross Katz	Nominated	
2009	Television Critics Association Awards	Outstanding Achievement in Movies, Miniseries and Specials		Nominated	
2010	American Cinema Editors Awards	Best Edited Miniseries or Motion Picture for Television	Lee Percy and Brian A. Kates	Nominated	
2010	American Society of Cinematographers Awards	Outstanding Achievement in Cinematography in Motion Picture/Miniseries Television	Alar Kivilo	Won	
2010	Cinema Audio Society Awards	Outstanding Achievement in Sound Mixing for Television Movies and Miniseries	T.J. O'Mara and Rick Ash	Nominated	
2010	Critics' Choice Awards	Best Picture Made for Television		Won	
2010	Directors Guild of America Awards	Outstanding Directorial Achievement in Movies for Television or Miniseries	Ross Katz	Won	
2010	Golden Globe Awards	Best Miniseries or Television Film		Nominated	
2010	Golden Globe Awards	Best Actor – Miniseries or Television Film	Kevin Bacon	Won	
2010	Producers Guild of America Awards	David L. Wolper Award for Outstanding Producer of Long-Form Television	Lori Keith Douglas, Ross Katz, Brad Krevoy, and Cathy Wischner-Sola	Nominated	
2010	Screen Actors Guild Awards	Outstanding Performance by a Male Actor in a Miniseries or Television Movie	Kevin Bacon	Won	
2010	Writers Guild of America Awards	Long Form – Adaptation	Michael Strobl and Ross Katz	Won	

== See also ==
- Vietnam Campaign Medal, a medal left on the casket by Phelps' father
- Vietnam Service Medal, a medal left on the casket by Phelps' father
