= Adult Beginners =

- Theatrical release poster
- Directed by: Ross Katz
- Screenplay by: Jeff Cox; Liz Flahive
- Story by: Nick Kroll
- Produced by: Jared Ian Goldman; Nick Kroll; Pau Bernon; Sam Slater; Marcus Cox; Karrie Cox
- Starring: Rose Byrne; Nick Kroll; Bobby Cannavale; Joel McHale
- Cinematography: Vanja Cernjul
- Edited by: Paul Frank
- Music by: Marcelo Zarvos
- Production companies: Burn Later Productions; Duplass Brothers Productions; Through Films
- Distributed by: RADiUS-TWC (North America); Universal Pictures (International)
- Release dates: September 8, 2014 (TIFF); April 24, 2015 (United States)
- Running time: 90 minutes
- Country: United States
- Language: English
- Budget: $2 million
- Box office: $108,808

Adult Beginners is a 2014 American comedy drama film directed by Ross Katz and written by Jeff Cox and Liz Flahive based on a story by Nick Kroll. The film stars Rose Byrne, Kroll, Bobby Cannavale, and Joel McHale.

RADiUS-TWC acquired the North American distribution rights of the film during its premiere at the 2014 Toronto International Film Festival. The film was released in a limited release in theatres and VOD on April 24, 2015.

== Cast ==
- Rose Byrne as Justine
- Nick Kroll as Jake
- Bobby Cannavale as Danny
- Joel McHale as Hudson
- Caleb and Matthew Paddock as Teddy
- Paula Garcés as Blanca
- Jane Krakowski as Miss Jenn
- Jason Mantzoukas as Herman
- Bobby Moynihan as Paul
- Josh Charles as Phil
- Neil Casey as Neil
- Mike Birbiglia as Braden
- Caitlin FitzGerald as Kat

== Production ==
=== Casting ===
On November 1, 2013, it was announced that Nick Kroll, Rose Byrne, and Bobby Cannavale were attached to star in Brother's Keeper - the original title which later changed to Adult Beginners. On December 10, 2013, Caitlin FitzGerald has been cast as Kat, Jake's girlfriend "who dumps him after his tech startup fails and he moves back to his family home."

This film marks the third onscreen appearance of actual couple Bobby Cannavale and Rose Byrne after having both appeared in Annie in 2014 and Spy earlier in 2015.

=== Filming ===
Principal photography took place in New York including a house on Elk Avenue in New Rochelle, New York for a month in January and February 2014.

== Release ==
Adult Beginners had its premiere at the 2014 Toronto International Film Festival on September 8, 2014. It was released on April 24, 2015 in a limited release in and through VOD on April 24, 2015 in the United States.

=== Marketing ===
The first trailer was released on March 14, 2015, titled "Make Me Jealous".

== Reception ==
=== Box office ===
During its opening weekend, Adult Beginners debuted with a total of $36,657 across ten theatres. As of September 24, 2015, the film has grossed $104,808 in North America.

=== Critical response ===
Adult Beginners received generally mixed reviews from critics. Review aggregator Rotten Tomatoes gives the film a 49% approval rating based on reviews from 78 critics, with an average score of 5.76/10. The website's critical consensus reads: "Perfectly pleasant yet never particularly engaging, Adult Beginners is a mild middle-of-the-road comedy content to coast on the charms of its talented cast." Metacritic gives the film a score of 57 out of 100 based on reviews from 26 critics.

Adult Beginners gained a fairly positive response at the Toronto International Film Festival, with Nikola Grozdanovic of Indiewire giving it a B+ grade, saying "it’s not perfect, but as far as feature debuts go, there’s very little you can fault Adult Beginners for. Slightly pedantic and maudlin at times, with telegraphed metaphors and some rushed pacing, it’s still hard to call any of these hiccups major flaws. Katz, with the help of an inspired cast and an emotionally intelligent and mature screenplay, has succeeded in depicting the trials and tribulations of adults who, all for respectfully different yet equally weighty reasons, often make a three-year-old the most mature person in the room." He also praised the supporting roles of McHale, Krawkowski, and particularly Moynihan. Phil Brown of Collider gave the film a B− grade calling it "cute". "It’s a very heartfelt, sweet, funny, moving and deliberately small movie that does exactly what it’s supposed to do and then rolks [sic] credits before wearing out it’s [sic] welcome. [...] It’s a little wisp of a comedy with enough warm sentiments and observations about eccentrically neurotic adults to slip in a little emotional sting."

Justin Chang of Variety said of the film that "it’s the sort of casual hangout vibe that feels so lived-in, it’s a shame when the film begins to devolve into the sort of rigged reconciliations and easy epiphanies it had largely avoided, up to a point. [...] Still, those imperfections are forgivable, even fitting, for a modest, well-assembled charmer that represents a welcome branching out for most of the key talents involved." Furthermore, at the South by Southwest Film Festival, Michael Roffman of Consequence of Sound said "you don’t need to rush out and see Adult Beginners. However, it’s an ideal Netflix viewing in the near future, when the winter shifts into something awful and the afternoon begs for a little couching."
