= Chance Phelps =

United States Marine

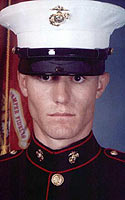
- Official photo
- Born: July 14, 1984; Riverton, Wyoming
- Died: April 9, 2004 (aged 19); Ramadi, Al Anbar, Iraq
- Burial place: Dubois, Wyoming
- Military career
- Allegiance: United States
- Branch: United States Marine Corps
- Service years: 2003–2004
- Rank: Lance Corporal (posthumous promotion)
- Unit: 3rd Battalion 11th Marines
- Conflicts: Iraq War † * Battle of Ramadi * Operation Vigilant Resolve
- Awards: Bronze Star Medal; Purple Heart Medal; Combat Action Ribbon; National Defense Service Medal; Global War on Terrorism Service Medal

Chance Russell Phelps (July 14, 1984 – April 9, 2004) was a Private First Class in the United States Marine Corps, posthumously promoted to Lance Corporal. He served with 2nd Platoon, Battery L, 3rd Battalion, 11th Marine Regiment (3/11), 1st Marine Division, and I Marine Expeditionary Force, during Operation Iraqi Freedom.

Phelps was killed in Iraq as the convoy he was escorting came under heavy fire. His story is the subject of an HBO movie, Taking Chance.

== Biography ==
Chance Russell Phelps was born on July 14, 1984 in Riverton, Wyoming to John Phelps and Gretchen Mack. John served during the Vietnam War in the United States Navy upon receiving his draft notice, and later when he had settled in Dubois, Wyoming, he joined the town's Veterans of Foreign Wars. He moved to Craig, Colorado as a young boy, later moving to Clifton, Colorado, where he graduated from Palisade High School in 2003.

Phelps was motivated to join the Marines by the events of September 11, 2001. After attending recruit training at Marine Corps Recruit Depot San Diego, he attended artillery school at Fort Sill, Oklahoma. He was finally assigned to 3rd Battalion, 11th Marines, with which he deployed to Iraq in February 2004.

== Death ==
Phelps was killed in action at approximately 13:30 (1:30pm) on April 9, 2004 at the age of 19, outside Ar Ramadi, Iraq. His unit was conducting convoy escort (including the assistant commander of the 1st Marine Division, Brigadier General John F. Kelly) when they came under heavy small arms fire, including rocket-propelled grenades. Despite being wounded, he refused evacuation, instead manning his M240 machine gun (or an M2 .50 caliber machine gun) to cover the evacuation of the rest of his convoy. Upon withdrawal, he sustained a fatal wound to the head.

== Honors ==
Phelps was buried in Dubois, Wyoming, on April 17, 2004, with full military honors. His remains were escorted home by Lt. Col. Michael Strobl, whose accounts of the escort were recorded in an article he wrote titled "Taking Chance". In attendance were his parents, stepparents, sister, the Chief of Naval Intelligence (for whom his sister was an aide), and every veterans' organization within 90 miles (140 km). Several days later, a memorial service was held in Camp Ramadi, Iraq, by his unit. Some time after that, Phelps was officially awarded a posthumous promotion to Lance Corporal. A baseball field constructed in Camp Ramadi was dedicated in his memory as Phelps Field. In mid-2005, a mess hall at Marine Corps Air Ground Combat Center Twentynine Palms was named Phelps Hall, with his citation posted on a boulder in front. Phelps is also memorialized by a rock garden at the 3/11 office and at the Dubois VFW post, as well as a plaque that travels with Battery L wherever it deploys and a battery mascot named after the Marine. The Theater at NMMV (National Museum of Military Vehicles) is named the Chance Phelps Theater outside Dubois, Wy.

=== Awards ===
Phelps' awards include:

Bronze Star w/ Valor device		Purple Heart
Combat Action Ribbon	Marine Corps Good Conduct Medal	National Defense Service Medal
Iraq Campaign Medal	Global War on Terrorism Service Medal	Sea Service Deployment Ribbon

=== Media attention ===
Phelps was the subject of a video segment originally broadcast on the News Hour with Jim Lehrer on April 20, 2004, entitled A Fallen Son. PBS ran a segment on Phelps' journey home as part of their Operation Homecoming documentary in the America at a Crossroads series on April 16, 2007.

==== Taking Chance ====
In 2009, an HBO movie, Taking Chance, based on Strobl's essay of the same name, was released.
