= Michael Strobl =

Retired United States Marine Corps officer

Michael R. Strobl, Ph.D.
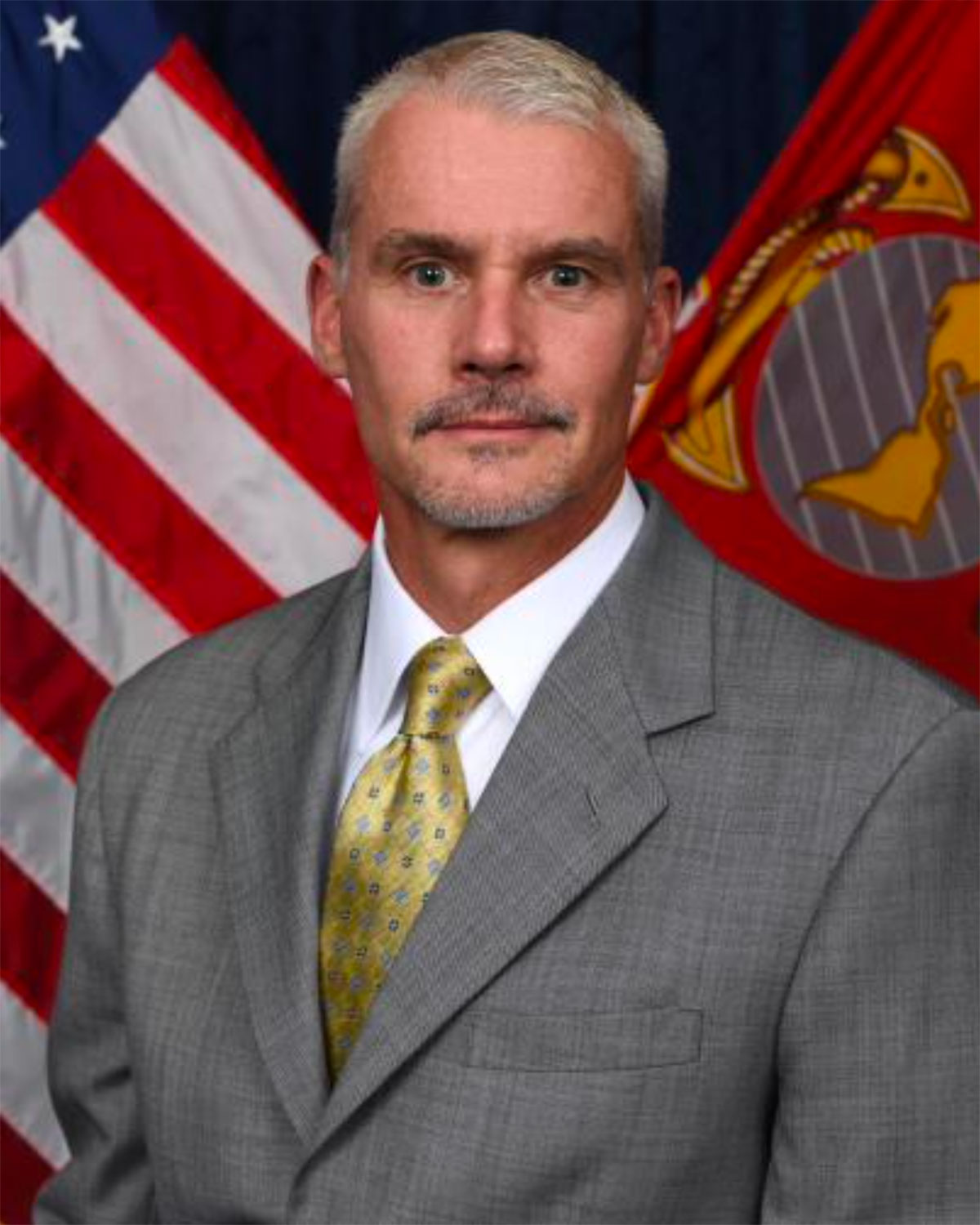
- Michael R. Strobl, PhD (2023); Assistant Deputy Commandant; Manpower & Reserve Affairs, USMC
- Born: 1966 (age 59–60); Grand Junction, Colorado
- Education: Colorado Mesa University (BBA); Averett University (MBA); Naval Postgraduate School (MS); George Mason University (PhD)
- Military career
- Allegiance: United States
- Branch: United States Marine Corps
- Service years: 1983–2007
- Rank: Lieutenant Colonel
- Conflicts: Operation Desert Storm
- Other work: Deputy Director, Manpower Plans & Policy Division, DOD; Assistant Deputy Commandant for Manpower and Reserve Affairs, USMC

Michael R. Strobl (born 1966) is an author and retired U.S. Marine Corps officer from Stafford, Virginia. Since 2021, he has been serving as the Assistant Deputy Commandant for Manpower and Reserve Affairs Headquarters, United States Marine Corps.

== Early life ==
Michael Strobl was born in 1966 in Grand Junction, Colorado. He enlisted in the United States Marine Corps in 1983, at age 17.

He earned a Bachelor’s of Business Administration (BBA) degree from Colorado Mesa University, a Master’s of Business Administration (MBA) degree from Averett University, a Master’s of Science (MS) degree in Manpower Systems Analysis, with distinction, from the Naval Postgraduate School, and a Ph.D. in economics from George Mason University.

== Career ==
=== Commission and tours ===
He was commissioned as second lieutenant in December 1987, with the MOS of artilleryman. During Operation Desert Storm, he was deployed to both Saudi Arabia and Kuwait, serving in both the 13th and 15th Marine Expeditionary Units. He served as an artillery platoon commander with the 11th Marines, battery commander with the 12th Marines, and Battalion Operations Officer and Regimental Fire Direction Officer with the 10th Marines.

His later tours included roles as instructor and Staff Platoon Commander at The Basic School; Assistant Operations Officer, Total Force Structure Division (MCCDC); and Head, Officer Distribution Branch at HQMC, Manpower & Reserve Affairs.

After retiring from the Marine Corps in 2007, Strobl accepted a position as an Operations Research Analyst in the Office of the Secretary of Defense (Cost Assessment and Program Evaluation) at the Pentagon. While serving at CAPE, he was the lead analyst on military manpower and compensation issues, as well as the Defense Health Program. He was appointed to the Senior Executive Service in September 2016 and served as the Deputy Director, Manpower Plans and Policy Division until assuming his current position as Assistant Deputy Commandant, Manpower & Reserve Affairs, Headquarters Marine Corps, in August 2021.

=== Escort for Chance Phelps ===
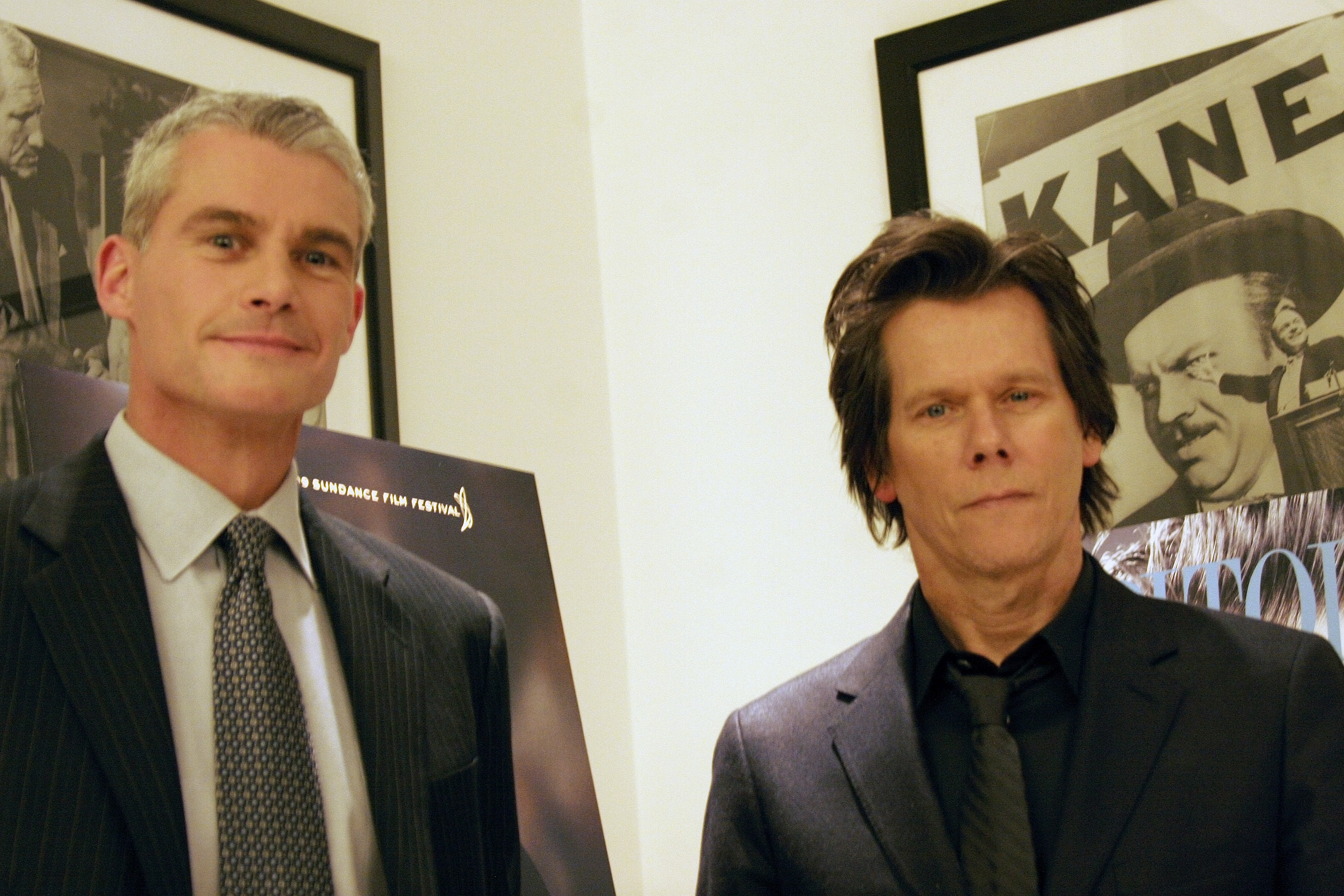
Michael R. Strobl and Kevin Bacon at the premiere of Taking Chance (2009)

LtCol Strobl was the final military escort for the remains of Lance Corporal Chance Phelps, (Note: At the time of his death, Phelps was a private first class (PFC). He was posthumously promoted to Lance Corporal.) a Marine killed in the Iraq War on April 9, 2004, outside Ar Ramadi, Iraq.

At the time, Strobl assigned to the Combat Development Command in Quantico, working as Marine Corps manpower analyst. After reading a Department of Defense press release about Phelps’ death, which listed Clifton, Colorado, as his hometown—a suburb of Strobl’s own hometown of Grand Junction—Strobl volunteered to escort Phelps’ remains from Dover Air Force Base in Delaware to their final resting place. However, Phelps had only lived in Clifton for his senior year of high school. His final destination and resting place would be Dubois, Wyoming, where he spent his early childhood.

During the trip, Strobl kept a diary of his experience. After returning home, he wrote an essay from the notes in the diary and shared it with Phelps' father, John. Strobl's 12-page narrative essay followed his journey with the remains of Lance Corporal Phelps from the military mortuary at Dover Air Force Base to Philadelphia, Minneapolis, Billings, Riverton, and Dubois. With the approval of John Phelps, a condensed version of the essay appeared in the San Francisco Chronicle on May 2, 2004, titled "A Marine's Journey Home". Subsequently, a longer version of the essay appeared in the July 2004 issue of Marine Corps Gazette as "Taking Chance".

Strobl's essay was the basis for the 2009 HBO film, Taking Chance. Strobl was portrayed in the film by Kevin Bacon. Strobl, along with the film's director, Ross Katz, wrote the screenplay for the film. Subsequently, he and Katz won the Writers Guild of America Award in Long Form Adaptation in Television at the Writers Guild of America Awards 2009 and were nominated for the Primetime Emmy Award for Outstanding Writing for a Miniseries, Movie, or a Dramatic Special.

== Decorations and awards ==

| Navy and Marine Corps Commendation Medal | Combat Action Ribbon | |
| Navy Unit Commendation | National Defense Service Medal w/ 1 service star | Southwest Asia Service Medal |
| Sea Service Deployment Ribbon w/ 2 service stars | Kuwait Liberation Medal (Saudi Arabia) | Kuwait Liberation Medal (Kuwait) |

Strobl received the Vietnam Veterans of America President's Award for Excellence in the Arts at the organization's national convention in Louisville, Kentucky, in August 2009.

== See also ==
- List of notable United States Marines
