= Bonnie Rychlak =

American female artist/sculptor

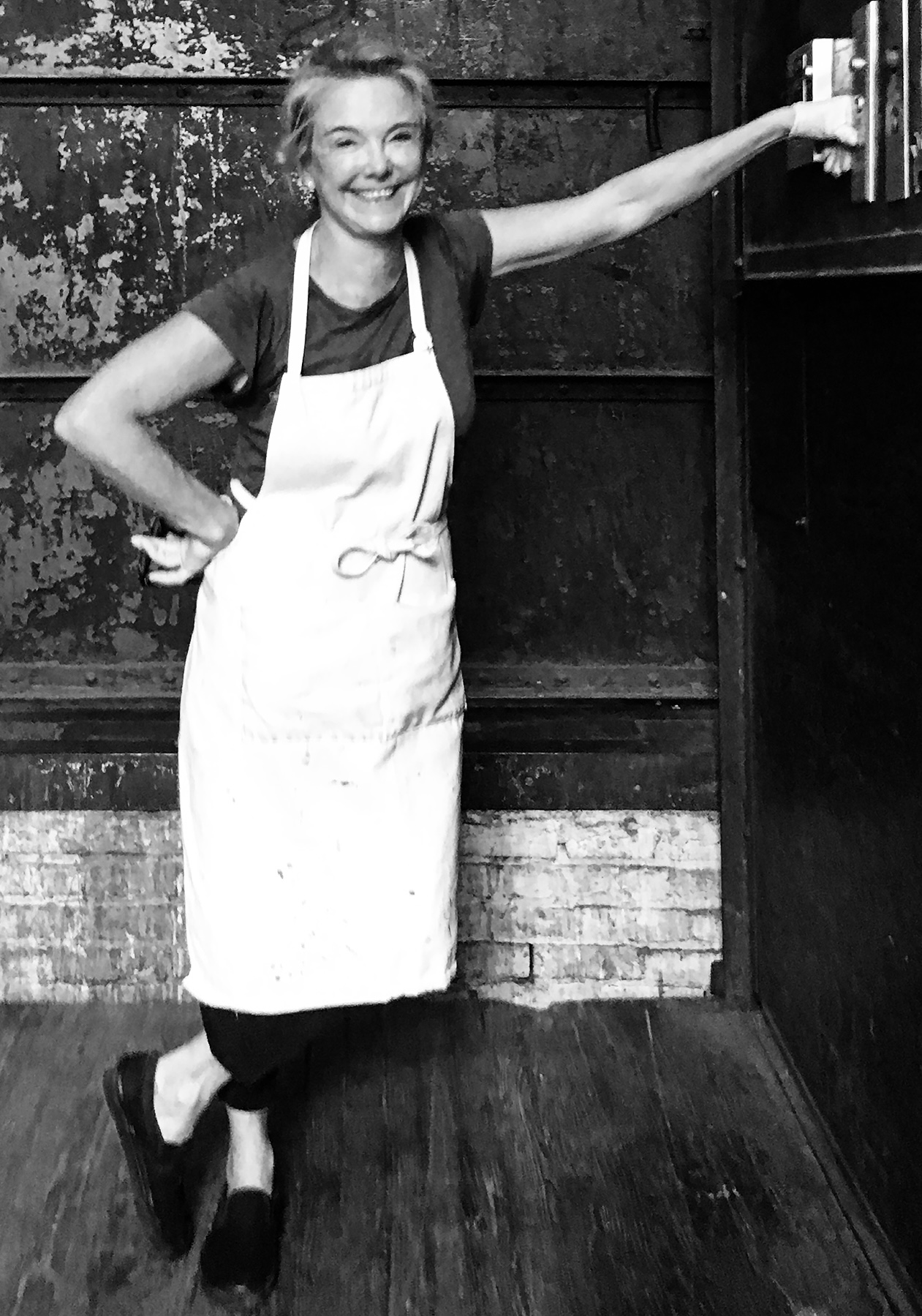
- Born: 1951 (age 74–75); Venice, California, United States
- Education: University of California at Los Angeles University of Massachusetts, Amherst
- Known for: Sculpture; Isamu Noguchi Expertise
- Awards: National Endowment for the Arts Rockefeller Foundation; American Academy in Rome
- Website: Bonnie Rychlak

Bonnie Rychlak (born 1951) is an American artist, curator, and writer. She is known for her wax sculptures representing functional urban forms and actions of evacuation and for her practice of carving, casting wax, and melting it into fabric. Influenced by the work of Eva Hesse and the encaustic paintings of Brice Marden and Jasper Johns, she employs wax as a medium for sculpture in its own right rather than simply as a transition to being cast in bronze. Her work has been featured in various solo and group exhibitions and is included in collections in the United States, Europe and Asia.

Rychlak is also recognized as an authority on the sculptor Isamu Noguchi, having curated numerous international exhibitions and authored the accompanying catalogs. Her many publications on his art are cited in related scholarship.

== Education and early career ==
Rychlak was born in Venice, California. After attending Venice High School, she studied at Santa Monica College and the University of California at Los Angeles, graduating with a Bachelor of Arts. Rychlak received a Master of Fine Arts in sculpture in 1976 at the University of Massachusetts, Amherst. She married the artist Brian Gaman in 1973; together they built a notable modernist art retreat in Springs, Long Island not far from the Pollock-Krasner House and Study Center.

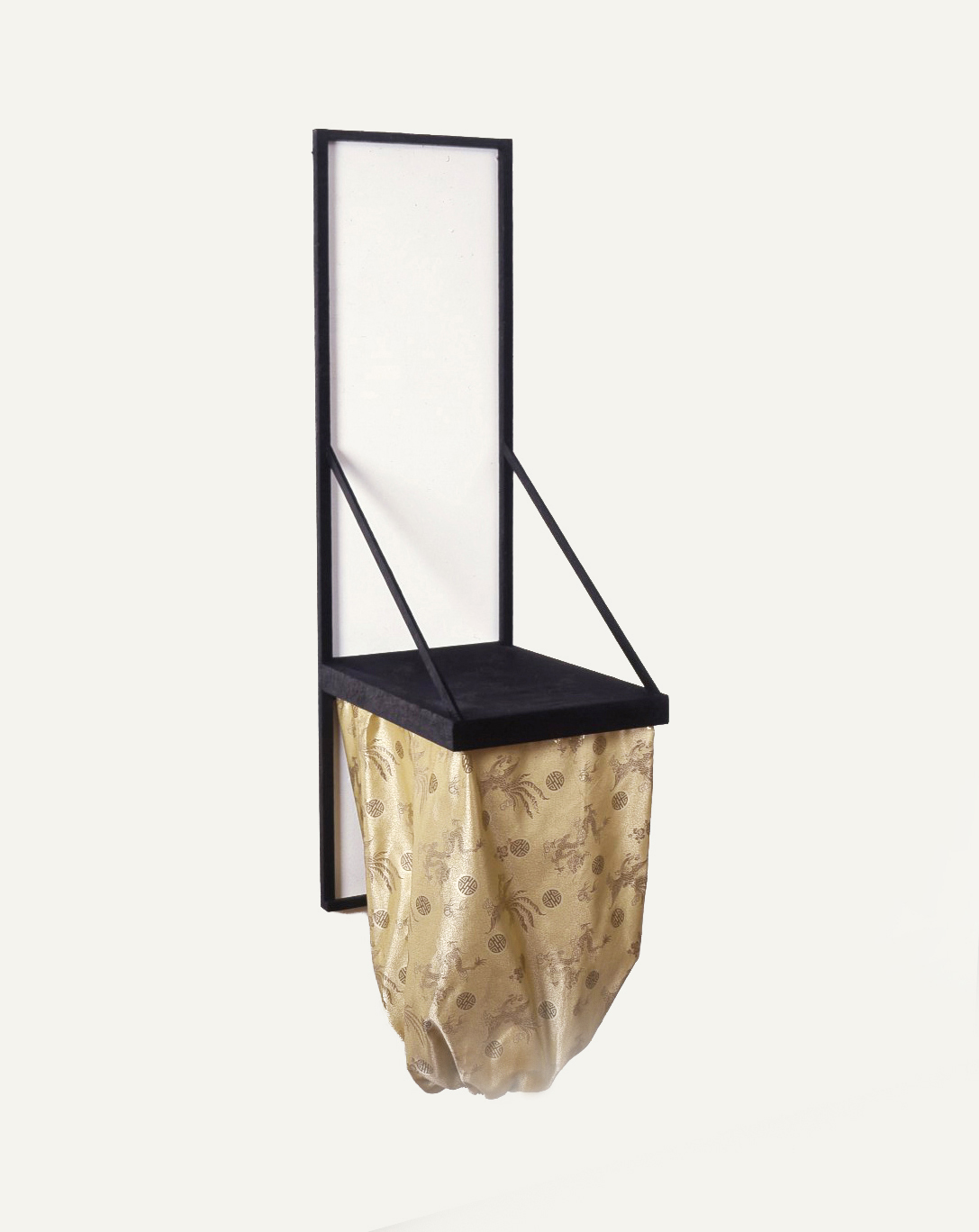
Suspended Chair Installation White Columns, 1986 Photo: Kevin Noble

Rychlak's inclusion in "Selections from the Artist Files" at Artist Space in 1986 on the heels of "New Uses," a consequential group show at White Columns, helped establish her artistic recognition in the New York art world, along with her first one-person gallery exhibition at the Rastovsky Gallery in 1988. In the same year, she was invited to participate alongside art world notables such as Faith Ringgold, Nancy Azara, and Hannah Wilke in a group show of 12 women sculptors at New York's A.I.R. Gallery. The exhibition, "Blue Angel: The Decline of Sexual Stereotypes in Post-Feminist Sculpture," aimed to "shatter the stereotype that feminism is in any way monolithic."

In the 1980s, Rychlak created parodies from the minimalist agenda. Reviewing an exhibition of her work, critic Ephraim Birnbaum was drawn to "her brilliant parodies of the minimalist cube. As a feminist riposte to the po-faced embargoes of Judd et al, they are priceless, converting mutely literal primary structures into no doubt rage-inducing upholstered, pillowed, buttoned and bowed boxes."

In a review of the works in Rychlak's 1989 solo exhibition at the Rastosky Gallery in New York, Art News critic Tiffany Bell, noted that “Rychlak contrasts the implied utility of the form with the preciousness of encaustic-a traditional material for art making. One might say it’s about transformation-either art humbled by the use of the mundane material or the materials made elegant and beautiful by the use of artistic form."

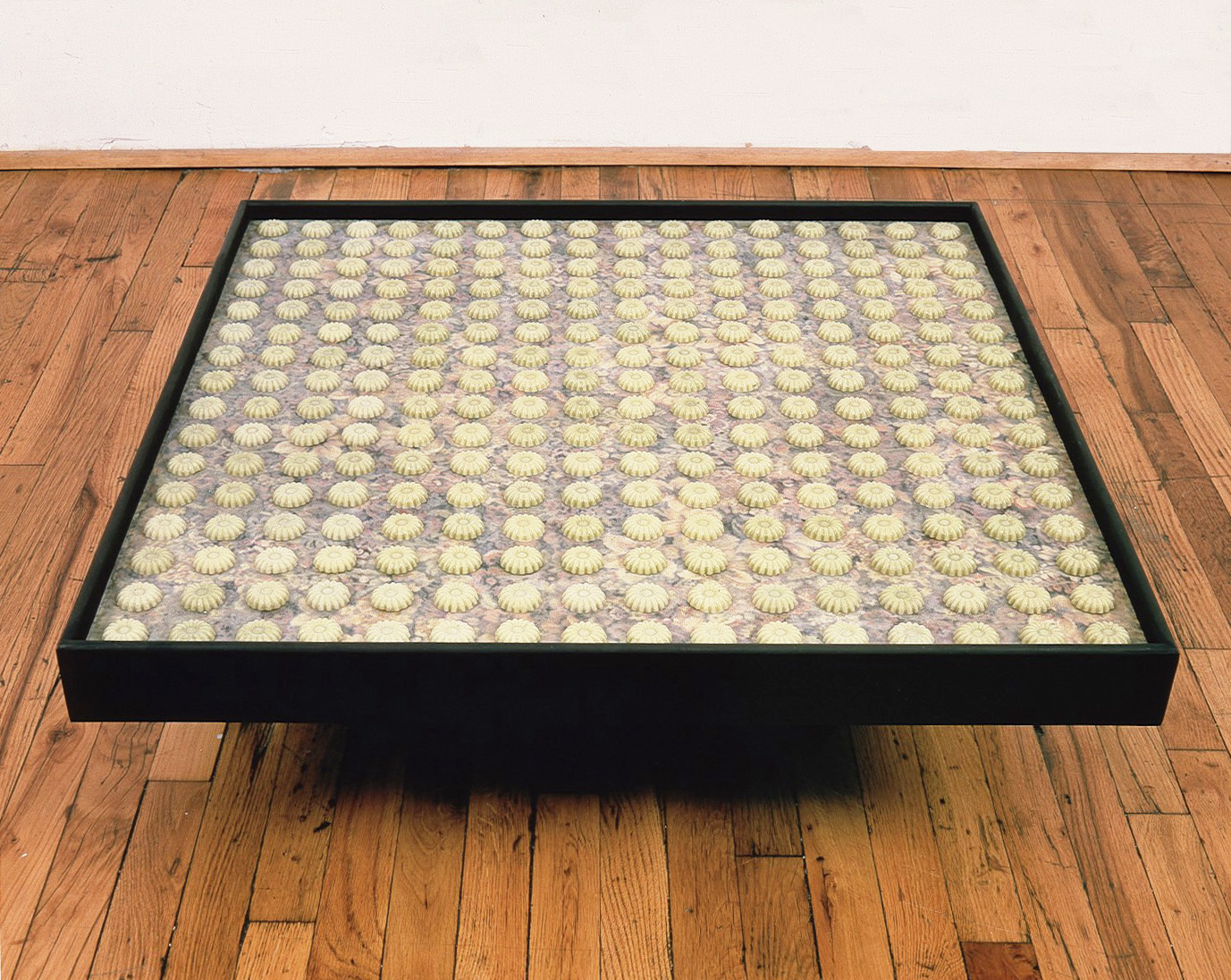
Coffee Table After Hesse Photo: Kevin Noble

Reviewing the same 1989 solo show for Arts Magazine, critic Robert Morgan addressed Rychlak’s neo-minimalist approach, noting that “Bonnie Rychlak’s show at Rastovski (February 2–25) is an extension of neo-minimalist sensibilities but without the distancing effects seen in works by such artists as Ronald Jones, Allan McCollum, and Louise Lawler. Rychlak’s artful abstractions, often based on furnishings, have an erotic intertextuality that brings geometry back in touch with tactile reality."

Rychlak's work in the 1990s, which she termed photo narratives, "is strongly illustrative of an invitation to plumb unassailable depths in a series based on photographs, evoking cut up and hand colored 'secrets' covered by thickly pebbled glass. The image inside the clean white box, reminiscent of medicine cabinets, can be read as banal or sinister, or just mysterious."

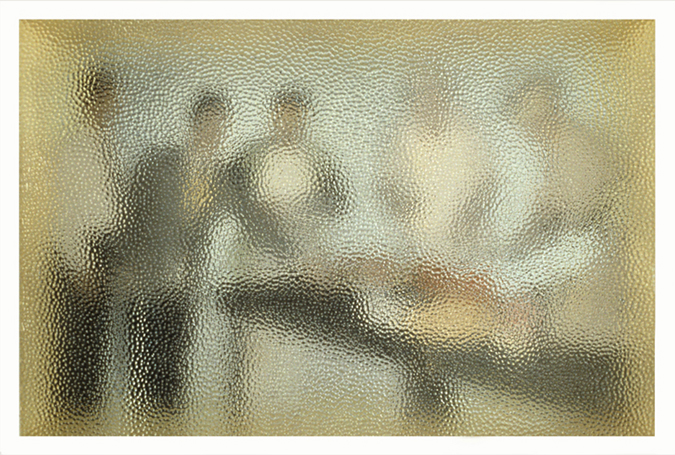
The Lesson Photo: Kevin Noble

When a Village Voice critic visited Rychlak’s studio on Lafayette Street before her show opened in 1994 at Gallery Three Zero, she was struck by the familiarity of the images in shadow boxes behind mottled-glass coverings. "Rychlak’s hand colored photo blowups of family snapshots mounted on mirror several inches beneath the blurring glass are mementos from her childhood,” she noted.

Along with these "photo narratives," as Rychlak refers to them, her sculptures in wax have been a constant enterprise throughout her forty-year artistic career.

== Later work ==
Briefly experimenting with colored resin in the early 2000s, Rychlak opted to return exclusively to carving of wax. "Her sculptures in wax share in a tale of disruption and playful decrepitude. She describes her practice as blunt but joyfully humorous," notes one critic. "Her current subjects are unfixed, drifting between ambiguity and the actual, drawing on unsettling juxtapositions of materials and metaphors."

In 2021, Rychlak collaborated with fellow New York artist Jeanne Silverthorne, mounting the exhibition Down and Dirty at the Lupin Foundation Gallery at the University of Georgia. The exhibition, which subsequently traveled to the Arts Center at Duck Creek in East Hampton, NY, and Project ArtSpace in New York City (2023), showcased conceptual and formal affinities between the two artists' works. "The dichotomy between ugly and beautiful is foundational for both artists," wrote curator Terrie Sultan in the catalog for the exhibition, "as is the recognition that tough topics are often best addressed and alleviated with humor."

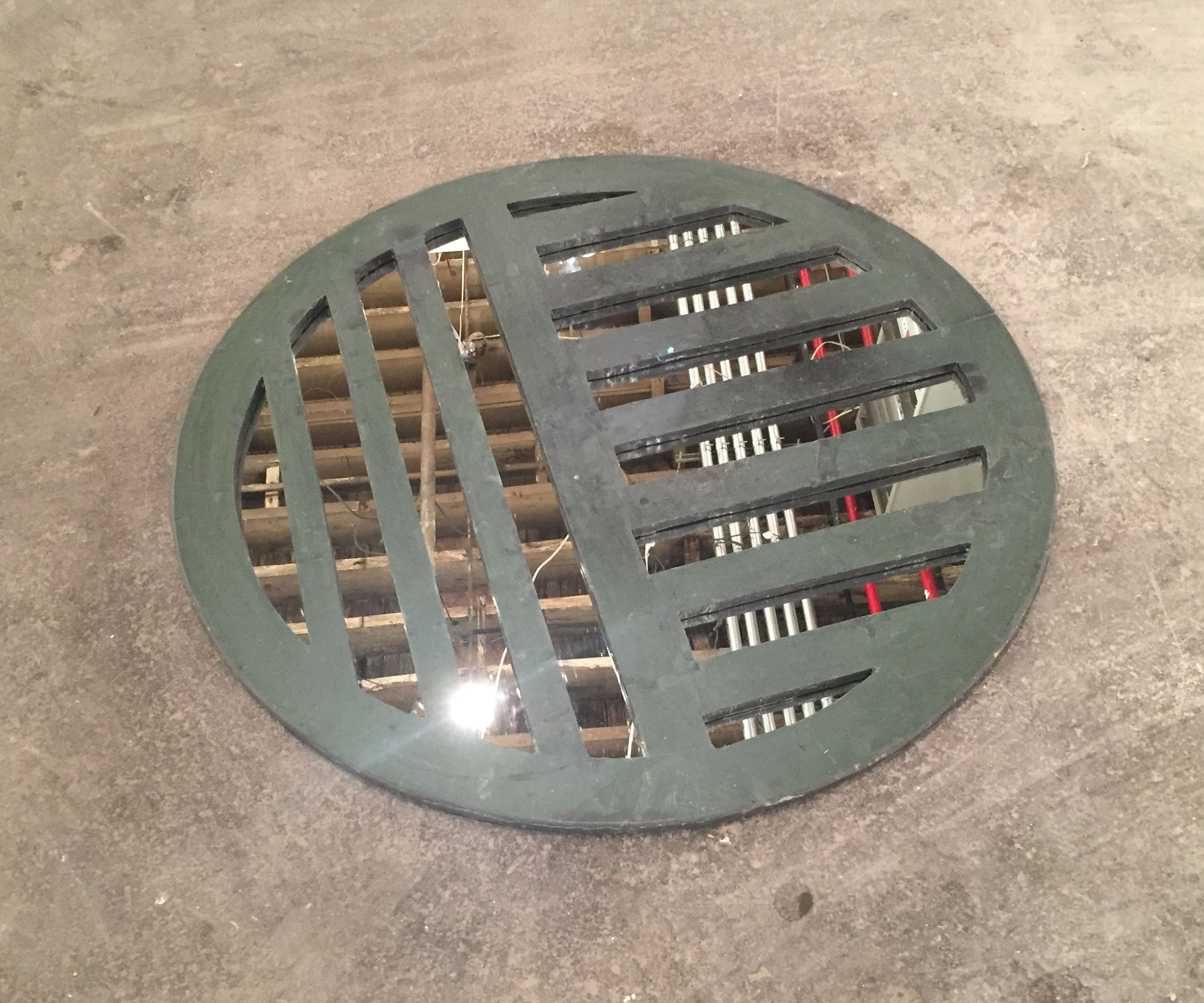
Looking Up Looking Down, 2021 Photo: Bonnie Rychlak

Turning her attention specifically to Rychlak's work, Sultan notes that "[t]he common floor drain--practical, functional, and so ubiquitous as to be almost invisible--is in [her] hands, simultaneously a geometric abstraction and a metaphoric conduit: The world is going down the drain, emotions drain away, countries experience brain drain [. . .] For Rychlak, however, the drains don't open. They imply another world, the mysterious, the unknowable down below, and what might lurk there."

Rychlak's recent work embraces the dysfunctional and unwanted, forms that invoke urbanism, industry, and the failed environment. Her process is labor-intensive and transformative, using mutable materials such as beeswax and paraffin. This work was featured in the exhibition "Bonnie Rychlak: Don't overplay it, sugar" at the Catskill Art Space (2025). In the accompanying catalog, Joanna Issak wrote: "The exploration of dichotomies is integral to Rychlak's artistic approach, which consistently seeks to expose the profound within the profane, the extraordinary within the banal, the beautiful in the abject, and the psychological within the physical."

The Revolution Will Not Be Televised, 2026

Rychlak's multi-piece sculpture, "The Revolution Will Not Be Televised," was one of several outdoor works featured in "Revolution" at Sylvestor Manor, Shelter Island, New York, from the June 13-October 4, 2026. The concept for the three "shelters," made of wood, burlap, and mirrors and sized respectively for a father, mother, and child, was based on the image of wigwams, as Woodland nuclear-family homes were popularly characterized. Not intended to mimic or represent the traditional structure or meaning of the wigwam, they infer accommodation for protection, a shield for security, a safe house, or a refuge from the environment. They evoke mysterious retreats, ones used perhaps to house dogs, hide Continental Army soldiers, shelter indigenous peoples, or enslaved families. Instead of the conventional communal fire pit in the center of the huts, Rychlak placed a cast-glass drain, evoking the metaphoric role these objects play throughout her practice. What was inside the huts was equally impenetrable; mirrors blocking the doorways only reflected the outside. The installation's ambiguity underscored the location's dark history as a slave plantation.

A solo show of Rychlak's work at The Bridgehampton Museum, Long Island, NY, in 2026 showcased her most recent encaustic sculptures provocatively displayed on the walls below the conventional height of painting, creating a tension in the perception of the works as sculpture or painting. In a review of the show, critic Saul Ostrow noted: "These works are neither reliefs nor shaped paintings in any settled sense. Each occupies the wall as painting traditionally has yet refuses the wall’s authority to determine what kind of object it is." Ostrow continues "The dome-like forms Rychlak makes consist of padded tapestry or fabric stretched across a wooden support, with occasional hardware serving structural and decorative ends refuse both the rigidity usually associated with sculpture and the elasticity of stretched canvas. Encaustic wax thickens and seals the fabric surface, producing a translucent skin that is at once soft, rigid, filmy, smooth, and unstable. It binds disparate elements and discourses into a singular form while retaining the associations her materials and forms carry. The resulting form is simultaneously swollen and compressed, tactile and resistant. In this synthesis, Rychlak does not resolve the problems of specificity and contingency but gives material form to their persistence.

Rychlak's work is in important private collections in Japan, the United Kingdom, Verona, Italy, and the United States. In the U.S., they are in private collections in New York, East Hampton, Los Angeles, and San Francisco. Public collections in the United States showcasing her work include The Bridgehampton Museum, New York, the History of Art and Architecture department at Harvard University, Columbia Presbyterian Medical Center / Fine Arts Collection of the US General Services Administration (GSA), and the Department of Art at the University of California, Los Angeles (UCLA). In Japan, her work is in the collections of Shizuoka-ken Prefectural Museum of Art.

== Curatorial career ==
As a curator, Rychlak worked for the Noguchi Museum for thirty years (1980-2010) beginning her association with the foundation as an assistant to Isamu Noguchi (1980-1988). As a leading authority on Isamu Noguchi and his œuvre, she was also managing editor of his catalog raisonne. Her numerous exhibitions and writings include a foreword to the reprint of Noguchi's 1968 autobiography, Isamu Noguchi: A Sculptor's World as well as other seminal essays that accompanied exhibitions.

Noguchi and the Figure (1999) was Rychlak's first international curatorial project. Organized for Museo de Arte Contemporaneo de Monterrey and the Museo Rufino Tamayo in Mexico City, it was the first critical analysis of Noguchi's sculptures in relation to the figure. In all of her writings about Noguchi and his work, she examined his legacy through his process and strategies, allaying art history's tendency to mythologize him. Through some of her essays and exhibitions, she reflected on the popularized exemplification of his "spirituality" as well as his understudied advances related to Japanese conventions of ceramics and furniture design.

In 1981, Noguchi introduced Rychlak to thousands of negatives and notebook drawings connected to a world travel grant he received from the Bollingen Foundation in the 1950s that took him around the world over a period of six years. Hoping to use the material for another autobiography, Noguchi kept it private during his lifetime. Rychlak ultimately staged an exhibition of this project fifteen years after Noguchi's death, illustrating Noguchi's deep interest in other cultures and the journey's impact on his artistic evolution.

During the Bollingen Journey exhibition at the Noguchi Museum, Elena Foster, founder and creative director of Ivory Press, visited the presentation and subsequently selected photographs for publication from the thousands of images not exhibited. Rychlak advised and wrote the commentary for the deluxe limited-edition book produced by Ivory Press.

After her employment at the Noguchi Museum, Rychlak organized On Display in Orange County: Modern and Contemporary Sculpture in 2011, which subsequently was incorporated into the Pacific Standard Time project in California. She was also a curatorial consultant to noted entrepreneur, art patron, and philanthropist Henry Segerstrom and his estate from 2011 to his death in 2015. She produced several exhibitions for cultural projects in South Coast Plaza, California, and authored a monograph on the renowned individual. Simultaneously she taught at the Pratt Art Institute and sat on the exhibition committee for the LongHouse Reserve in East Hampton, New York. In 2012, she organized an outdoor sculpture exhibition for the LongHouse. From 2011 to 2018, she was a curatorial partner with Peter Hopkins, director and founder of ArtHelix, a Brooklyn gallery, helping organize several exhibitions for the gallery.

== Awards ==
Bonnie Rychlak received a grant from the National Endowment for the Arts (1976), a fellowship from the Rockefeller Foundation for a residency at the Bellagio Center (1985), the Prix de Rome from the American Academy in Rome (1990), and two residencies at the Bogliasco Foundation (2013 and 2020).

== Selected publications ==
- "On Noguchi's Studio and the Bollingen Archives," transcribed interview for Looking Forward: Ivory Press at Twenty-Five, London and Madrid: Ivory Press, 2021, p. 53-548.
- "Noguchi. Myth. Graham. A Spiritual Quest," in Noguchi Between East and West, Exhib. cat. Basil & Elize Goulandris Foundation Museum of Contemporary Art. Andros, Greece: Umberto Allemandi & C., 2010, p. 29-47.
- The Courage of Imagination: The Cultural Legacy of Henry T. Segerstrom. New York and Paris: Assouline Publishers, 2013.
- Diversities of Sculpture/Derivations from Nature. Exhib. cat. East Hampton: LongHouse Reserve, 2012.
- "In Search of the Authentic," in Design: Isamu Noguchi and Isamu Kenmochi. New York: Five Ties Publications, 2007, p. 21-53.
- "Introduction," Isamu Noguchi and the Bollingen Journey: Photographs and Drawings. London: Ivory Press, 2007.
- "Noguchi’s Romance With Ceramics," in Metamorphosis in Clay: Noguchi in Kamakura. Exhib. cat. Madrid: Fundacion ICO, 2006, p. 215-228.
- "Shifting Desires for Parks and Playgrounds: Noguchi's Landscape Designs," in Isamu Noguchi: Connecting the World Through Sculpture. Exhib. cat. Yokohama: The Yokohama Museum of Art, 2005, p. 15-18.
- "Constructing the Dance and Assembling The Sculpture" in Noguchi and Graham: Selections from the Dance. Exhib. cat. New York: The Noguchi Museum, December, 2004, p. 39-47.
- "Sitting Quietly: Isamu Noguchi and the Zen Aesthetic," in Isamu Noguchi, Master Sculptor. Exhib. cat. The Whitney Museum of American Art and the Hirshhorn Museum. London: Scala Publishers, 2004, p. 10-28.
- "Forward," A Sculptor's World by Isamu Noguchi. Reprint from 1968. Gottingen: Steidl, April 2004.
- "A Glimpse of Isamu's Life and Works," in Isamu Noguchi, Human Aspect as a Contemporary: 54 Witnesses in Japan and America, The Shikoku Shimbun, Kagawa, Japan. 2002, p. 034-036.
- "Noguchi and the Figure," in Noguchi y la Figura. Exhib. cat. Mexico City: Museo de Arte Contemporaneo de Monterrey and The Museo Rufino Tamayo, Monterrey and Mexico City, 1999.
- "Noguchi and Graham," Martha Graham Dance Company One Hundred Years, Ed. NYC Dance Project, New York: Black Dog & Leventhal Pub., 2025, 278-281.
