= Connie Kemmerer =

American businesswoman and philanthropist

Constance Anne Kemmerer, commonly known as Connie Kemmerer, is an American businesswoman and philanthropist. Kemmerer served as a co-owner of the Jackson Hole Mountain Resort in Teton Village, Wyoming in the Jackson Hole valley. She jointly owned the resort with her siblings, Jay and Betty, since 1992. Their family connection to Wyoming dates to the late nineteenth century when their great-grandfather, Mahlon Kemmerer, financed the founding of the Kemmerer Coal Company. Kemmerer, Wyoming, which started as a company town for Kemmerer Coal Company, is home to the first J. C. Penney store.

== Early life and education ==
Kemmerer grew up in Short Hills, New Jersey, a community in Millburn, New Jersey. After graduating from the Beard School (now the Morristown-Beard School) in Orange, New Jersey in 1962, she studied at Finch College in Manhattan, New York City. Kemmerer earned her master's degree in art history from Indiana University Bloomington. She later earned her Ph.D. in anthropology.

== Integrative health and adventuring activities ==
In 2003, Kemmerer co-founded the Integrative Healthcare Foundation, which now goes by the name Teton Wellness Institute. While serving as chair of the Institute, she organized a presentation by adventurist Lori Schneider. On May 23, 2009, Schneider become the first person diagnosed with multiple sclerosis to reach the summit of Mount Everest, the highest mountain on Earth. Kemmerer served as Schneider's climbing partner when they climbed to the summit of Mount Kilimanjaro in Tanzania, the tallest mountain in Africa, in 2011. After working with missionaries in Ethiopia as a young adult, Kemmerer had first climbed the mountain at age 20.

== C. M. Ranch ==
In 1997, Kemmerer jointly purchased the C. M. Ranch in Dubois, Wyoming with Jay and Betty Kemmerer. The dude ranch is one of the oldest continually operating guest ranches in the U.S. Charles Moore, the son of a trader at Fort Washakie on the Wind River Indian Reservation, started C. M. Ranch in 1927 and ran it until the 1950s. C. M. Ranch lies adjacent to Whiskey Mountain, home to the largest wintering Rocky Mountain Bighorn Sheep herd in North America. The ranch's location in a valley in the Wind River Mountain Range near Shoshone National Forest enables its guests to visit Yellowstone National Park with a short drive by car. The south entrance to the park is about 60 miles from the ranch.
