= Jeanne Silverthorne =

American sculptor

- Born: 1950 (age 74–75); Philadelphia, Pennsylvania, United States
- Education: Temple University
- Known for: Sculpture, installation art
- Awards: Guggenheim Fellowship, Joan Mitchell Foundation, Anonymous Was a Woman Award
- Website: Jeanne Silverthorne

Jeanne Silverthorne (born 1950) is an American sculptor, known for cast-rubber sculptures and installations that explore the artist's studio as a metaphor for artistic practice, the human body and psyche, and mortality. She gained prominence in New York City in the 1990s, as one of several material-focused sculptors who critiqued the austere, male-dominated Minimalist movement by embracing humble, unorthodox media and hand-made, personal and ephemeral qualities championed by artists such as Eva Hesse and Louise Bourgeois. She treats the studio as a physical and conceptual site to be excavated, documented and inventoried, examining in the words of Sculpture's Jan Riley "the end of studio arts … and the impossibility of this mode of expression regaining its former creative validity and vitality in today’s world." Art in America critic Raphael Rubinstein wrote that, like the late studio paintings of Philip Guston, Silverthorne examines "deeply melancholic realms, enlivened by the occasional mordant joke, in which lowly objects are relentlessly and lovingly queried for a meaning they never seem quite ready to yield."

Jeanne Silverthorne, Pneuma Machine (in daylight and glowing in the dark), kinetic rubber sculpture, dimensions variable, 2005.

Silverthorne has been recognized with a Guggenheim Fellowship, Joan Mitchell Foundation Award, and Anonymous Was a Woman Award, among others, and her art has been acquired by institutions including the Museum of Modern Art (MoMA) and San Francisco Museum of Modern Art. She has exhibited internationally, in solo shows at the Phillips Collection, Whitney Museum of American Art, Institute of Contemporary Art, Philadelphia (ICAP) and PS1, and group exhibitions at MoMA, Albright-Knox Gallery and Haus der Kunst (Munich), among others. Silverthorne is based in New York and has taught at the School of Visual Arts since 1993.

== Education and early career ==
Jeanne Silverthorne was born in 1950 in Philadelphia, Pennsylvania. After earning a BA from Temple University in 1971, she studied at the Pennsylvania Academy of the Fine Arts and married environmental lawyer, publisher and author Robert Emmet Hernan, before returning to Temple to complete an MA degree (1974). For most of the 1980s, she split time between New York City and Philadelphia, making sculpture, exhibiting in both cities, teaching, and writing art, film and theater reviews for Artforum; in 1988 she permanently settled in New York.

Her early work balanced conceptual interests in the body, everyday objects, and linguistic and artistic representation with materialist concerns for mass, tactility and surface, which she explored in cast hydrocal or epoxy table and floor sculptures. This work included cast prosthetic devices, often paired with short phrases suggesting loss or lack; piles of jumbled-ribbon with wind-up keys ("DNA sculptures") that portrayed genetic code as a messy, disorderly toy and scientific descriptions of life as inadequate; a primitive, Venus of Willendorf-type torso; and cast objects representing ideas (Light Bulbs, 1986; Thought Bubble, 1987). Reviews characterize these sculptures as anti-heroic, anti-formalist, anthropomorphic and reminiscent of aspects of work by Jasper Johns, Claes Oldenburg, Fischli & Weiss and Richard Tuttle, among others; New York Times critic Roberta Smith described them as "burnt offerings, small catastrophes that have just walked out of a cartoon."

== Mature work: the artist's studio ==
Beginning in the early 1990s, Silverthorne turned her attention to the artist's studio, regarded as a romantic anachronism or ruin, including its outmoded infrastructure and sculptural tradition, objects and tools, detritus, and the artist herself. She exploited the fleshy, light-deadening nature of cast rubber and dramatic shifts in scale (microscopic views, miniatures, extreme enlargements) to give ordinary elements qualities of absurdity, futility, morbidity and unfamiliarity. Conceptually, this work investigates metaphors for the human body and its systems, the artist's creative process and psyche, decay, and the exhaustion of studio-art conventions of authorship and the hand, mastery and mimesis, originality, and timelessness; Artforum noted in this project a sense of profound loss and romanticism beneath "cool strategies."

Jeanne Silverthorne, Untitled (Chandelier), rubber, dimensions variable, 1995.

Silverthorne gained increasing attention through the decade with exhibitions at Rocca Paolina (Italy), ICA Boston, Wright Museum of Art, Deste Foundation (Athens) and the Whitney Museum, among others. Critics describe these exhibitions as sardonically humorous, sprawling arrangements of cast, excavated studio objects—often forming Rube Goldberg-like systems or organisms—unified by snaking skeins of wires, cables and tubes connected to cast outlets, transformers and fuse boxes that functioned like drawings in space. Her 1994 McKee Gallery show featured an immense, nonfunctional cast chandelier hung at eye-level; Holland Cotter described the show as a perfectly preserved, perverse industrial dystopia with "a post-Vesuvian chill." Michael Kimmelman called her 1997 show "good creepy fun" that made "the inorganic organic [and] the functional functionless."

In exhibitions at ICAP (1996) and the Whitney Museum at Philip Morris (1999), Silverthorne reworked tiny casting fragments resembling packing-case noodles into large black rubber sculptures that offered an ironic, absurdist take on the persistence of 19th-century artistic tropes and contemporary desperation for new visual forms. The Whitney installation (The Studio Stripped Bare, Again, referencing Duchamp) featured swags of black electrical cords hung from a high atrium ceiling and spilled across floors, which converged on a grey, cast light bulb suspended over two of the tiny fragments under a magnifying glass. Village Voice critic Kim Levin called the bulb—a cartoon signifier of artistic inspiration—a sinister, "imploded metaphor of modern genius" that Silverthorne switched off, extinguishing "the whole modern project"; Artforum's David Frankel described the show as "a haunted meditation on artmaking and productivity, body and thought, inspiration and inertia."

Jeanne Silverthorne, Knothole, rubber and phosphorescent pigment, 24.25" x 20.5" x 5", 2011.

=== Framed reliefs and machines ===
Silverthorne's late-1990s Whitney and McKee shows also featured flesh- and ochre-colored reliefs based on microscopic views of human skin and glands, which she enlarged, molded and cast, and framed in ornate, black cast-latex frames. These works make explicit her studio-as-body metaphor, yet their swarming patterns, swirls and protuberances also portray the body as foreign and strange. Reviews liken them to surrealistic alien terrains, giant Victorian cameos gone mad, abstract paintings or grotesque fairy-tale mirrors engendering "cycles of fascination and disgust."

In subsequent exhibitions, Silverthorne fashioned the reliefs as objectified emotional states, often in conjunction with machine-like apparatuses. Fear Machine and Tear Machine (2002, Shoshana Wayne Gallery) connected the reliefs Dry Mouth (2002) and Aching (2001) through cords, pipes and switches to apparent "emotional engines" that Los Angeles Times critic Holly Myers characterized as "simultaneously beautiful and grotesque, delicate and monstrous." Big Grief and Little Grief (2003, McKee) conjoined reliefs of a throat and tear ducts to, respectively, a rubber speaker emitting an empty word-balloon and a pipe yielding a cartoon teardrop.

In later work, Silverthorne shifted to floral reliefs (e.g., Knothole, 2011). Her 2008 McKee show featured blue, white and pink blossoms, dead-black rubber frames, and feeding bees, ladybugs and flies that Artforum described as "lurid vitality coexist[ing] with decay." Her show at The Phillips Collection (2013) was a tragicomic exploration of the classical vanitas themes of the transience of life and beauty and futility of pleasure, which juxtaposed paintings from the museum's vaults with her own sculptures and reliefs such as Phosphorescent Pink With Flies and Dandelion Clock.

=== Figurative and DNA portraits ===
In the early 2000s, Silverthorne began including tiny (less than one foot), antiheroic self-portraits in her exhibitions. Shows at Shoshana Wayne (2002) and the Albright–Knox Gallery (2003) featured a centrally located Plexiglas vitrine containing two identical female figures (one with red hair, the other with gray) with their knees drawn up, that Holly Myers suggested were the "vehicles" within which Silverthorne's surrounding emotional machines operated. Other self-portraits depict Silverthorne seated with legs outstretched on cast shipping crates (Jeanne (Up and Down), 2008), trapped in a clear box, and as an unraveling figure (Unstrung, 2014).

Jeanne Silverthorne, Jeanne (Up and Down), rubber and phosphorescent pigment, 9" high, 2008.

Silverthorne also created portraits of family members and close friends in luminescent rubber (e.g., of her mother, in Under a Cloud, 2003), which relate to her larger project as "ghosts" that accompany her in the studio. The portraits often include a subject's actual hair and DNA reports that trace genetic ancestry back over thousands of years and provide unique genetic "fingerprints." The juxtaposition of human hair and industrial rubber raises themes common to her reliefs—frailty, biological decay, longevity, toxicity—while the intimacy and idiosyncrasy of the renderings and DNA reports highlight tensions between uniqueness and authenticity and the common and copied.

=== Later exhibitions ===
Silverthorne's later exhibitions have been described as compendia of her prior bodies of work and preoccupations—existential, sometimes macabre meditations leavened by humor, skepticism about artmaking, and new wrinkles, such as kinetic elements, metaphorical vignettes, cast shipping crates, observer-like caterpillars and ecological themes. Her 2008 McKee show included Untitled (Bad Ideas), a discard bin overflowing with lightbulbs (all cast in rubber), and Pneuma Machine (2005), a kinetic installation of interconnected, small rubber appliances in phosphorescent yellow-bone color that intermittently shuddered to motorized life, which critics likened to an operating table or to the work of Samuel Beckett, but in sculpture. Later shows featured vignettes that served as metaphors for Silverthorne and her creative process: casts of her studio floor invaded by weeds and insects; a moth drawn to light; Suicidal Sunflower (2014), a black-and-white flower strangled by an electric cord noose; Self-Portrait as a Fly With Glasses (2017).

Silverthorne's exhibition “Down the Hole and Into the Grain” (Shoshana Wayne, 2014) consisted of fifty sculptures of mainly office items (actual-size chairs and desks, computers, light bulbs and fixtures, supplies) in neat rows like storage areas, their ordinariness upset by oversize pencils, caterpillars and flies and undersized figurines and skeletons. In her 2019 show at Marc Straus, Silverthorne drew on Mary Shelley's Frankenstein to examine the Promethean role of the artist and the dilemma of creations taking on lives of their own. The Brooklyn Rail compared her dull, cast lightbulbs (that can't shine) and outlets without electricity to corporeal phantoms, like the fictional monster, that imitate perfectly but are divorced from the reality; the show included the sculpture Frankenstein, a glowing book propped open on a plinth with text meticulously copied from original in invisible ink that was made visible by UV light.

Silverthorne collaborated in 2021 with fellow New York artist Bonnie Rychlak in mounting the exhibition Down and Dirty at the Lupin Foundation Gallery at the University of Georgia. The exhibition, which subsequently traveled to the Arts Center at Duck Creek in East Hampton, NY and Project ArtSpace in New York City (2023), showcased conceptual and formal affinities of the two artists' work. "The dichotomy between ugly and beautiful is foundational for both artists," wrote curator Terry Sultan in the catalog for the exhibition, "as is the recognition that tough topics are often best addressed and alleviated with humor."

== Awards and collections ==
Silverthorne was recognized with a John Simon Guggenheim Memorial Fellowship in 2017, a Joan Mitchell Foundation Award in 2010, and an Anonymous Was A Woman Award in 1996, the award's inaugural year. She has also received grants from the Penny McCall Foundation Grant (2002) and National Endowment for the Arts (1980) and fellowships from the Civitella Ranieri Foundation (1995) and Pennsylvania Council on the Arts (1982).

Her work belongs to the public collections of the Museum of Modern Art, San Francisco Museum of Modern Art, Whitney Museum, Museum of Fine Arts, Houston, Albright–Knox Gallery, Denver Art Museum, Fonds national d'art contemporain (FNAC, France), Honolulu Museum of Art, Leeum, Samsung Museum of Art (Korea), The Phillips Collection, RISD Museum, and Weatherspoon Art Museum, among others.

== Other sources ==
- Flynn, Tom. The Body in Three Dimensions, New York: Harry N. Abrams, Inc., 1998.
- Isaak, Jo Anna. Feminism and Contemporary Art, New York: Routledge, 1996.
- Seigel, Jeanne. "Eva Hesse’s Influence Today? Conversations with Three Contemporary Artists," Art Journal, Summer, 2004, p. 72–88.
- Von Hardenberg, Irene. Im Atelier, Gerstenberg Verlag, 2005.
