= Stephanie Brody-Lederman =

Contemporary artist based in New York, United States

Stephanie Brody-Lederman is a New York painter, book artist, and sculptor whose mixed media works combine visual imagery with words. In 1977-1978 her art was included in the major exhibition American Narrative/Story Art--1967-1977 at the Contemporary Arts Museum in Houston, Texas.

== Education ==
She attended Finch College in NYC, where she received a B.S. degree in Design in 1961. The Finch Alumni Association toured her loft art studio in Dumbo as part of a 2011 fundraising event. She earned an M.A. in Painting from Long Island University, C.W.Post, Greenvale, New York, in 1975, and also attended the University of Michigan School of Architecture

== Exhibitions ==
Brody-Lederman's mixed media art since the early 1970's has been included in many important museum exhibitions along with contemporary artists such as Jennifer Bartlett, Lynda Benglis and Jackie Winsor. In 1980 her art was shown at the Summit Art Center in Summit, New Jersey. Stephanie Brody-Lederman has had solo exhibitions at Guild Hall Museum in East Hampton, New York, Islip Art Museum, East Islip, New York and Musée Bourdelle in Paris. Her art is in many public collections including Museum of Modern Art, New York, and the Cooper-Hewitt Museum. She has been represented by OK Harris Gallery.

In 1977, her art was included in a group exhibition at the New Jersey State Museum in the Trenton Capitol Complex. In 1978 her solo exhibition in a Nassau County, Long Island museum was closed after four hours by the museum's failure to comply with fire regulations. In 1980 her art was shown at the Summit Art Center in Summit New Jersey. Kathryn Markel Fine Arts, Inc. represented Lederman, along with Barton Lidice Benes and Pat Lasch at Art 1981 at the Chicago Navy Pier Show, and her art shown at a Kathryn Markel group show was reviewed.

A reviewer of her 1995 exhibit Summer Light at Louisiana State University at Shreveport described her art as both puzzling and avant garde. In 2000, Lederman contributed a painted bovine called "Hot Tips" to the New York City CowParade. In 2001, a reviewer compared Lederman's exhibition Tropisms and Small Fires in Fort Myers, Florida to Jean Dubuffet's description of l'art brut.

She had a solo exhibition in 2013 at OK Harris Gallery in New York’s SoHo district, South of Houston Street in Manhattan, and is a regular exhibitor there. In 2017 she continues to participate in group exhibitions in The Hamptons, winning first place in the Guild Hall's 70th Anniversary show. Her art was selected for the 2017-2018 group show Text Me:How We Live in Language at the Museum of Design Atlanta (MODA).

In 2018 her painting "Outdoor Girl" was bought by Shakespeare and Company (bookstore) in Paris. The painting will be installed in the bookstore during the winter of 2018/19 and was shown previously at Guild Hall and Arlene Bujese gallery.

== Biography ==
Brody-Lederman was an only child, born in New York City. She has said that “My family moved a lot. It was stressful. I found an outlet for what I was thinking and feeling in drawing and painting." Her father was a real-estate broker and owned a gallery for a short period.

== Honors and awards ==
Her artwork has been featured on the covers and pages of The Paris Review and L’Oeil Magazines. Her painting "Rover has soft ears" appeared in On The Issues Magazine in 2009. Among her grants and awards are New York Foundation for the Arts, LMCC (Lower Manhattan Cultural Council), Artists Space, Percent for Art, SOS Grant, Hassam and Speicher Award, New York Foundation for the Arts/NEA LINE Grant, Ariana Foundation for the Arts Grant, E.D Foundation Grant and Percent for Art award. Her art was featured in the Alexandria Quarterly, The Art Edition 2016.
