= Nancy Azara =

American sculptor (1939–2024)

- Born: Annunziata Jean Azara; October 13, 1939; New York City, New York, U.S.
- Died: June 27, 2024 (aged 84); New York City, New York, U.S.
- Education: Empire State College; Finch College
- Known for: Sculpture; Collage
- Movement: Feminist Art Movement
- Website: nancyazara.com

Annunziata Jean Azara (October 13, 1939 – June 27, 2024) was an American sculptor. Her work involved sculpture using carved, assembled and highly painted wood with gold and silver leaf and encaustic. The wood, the paint and the layers that make up the sculpture record a journey of memory, images and ideas. Azara's other art pieces involved collages, banners, prints where she continuously reshaped the elements and materials. Azara worked and carved in wood for many years because of the presence and symbolism inherent in trees and because the metaphor of the tree is a "stand-in" for herself. This statement and representation of tree as “self” and woman was timely in a world which is losing touch with its primal essence.

== Life and career ==
Nancy J. Azara was born in the Dyker Heights section of Brooklyn, New York, and named after her mother, Annunciata (Como) Azara. Her father, Joseph Azara, owned an air conditioning business. She was a graduate of Finch College, NY; Empire State College, SUNY and also studied at the Art Students League of New York and at the Lester Polakoff Studio of Stage Design.

After graduating from Finch, she became a costume designer for the theatre. Known for her artwork that encompasses feminism, healing and individual connection to the divine, she developed her political views and signature style as a part of the 1970s feminist art movement in the United States. She was included in the feminist publication Heresies and most recently in the Woman's Art Journal.

In 1979, Azara co-founded a feminist art school, the New York Feminist Art Institute in 1979–1990 with Miriam Schapiro, Carol Stronghilos, Irene Peslikis, Lucille Lessane and Selena Whitefeather. NYFAI's mission was to examine issues relating to gender, self, and identity through a non-traditional curriculum. Within the context of group sessions, students concentrated on developing a better understanding of themselves and their position as women before embarking on the study of artistic technique. The chronic shortage of funding ultimately forced NYFAI to close in 1990, although some of its innovative art programs continue in other venues.

Azara died of congestive heart failure on June 27, 2024, at the age of 84.

== Exhibitions ==
Azara more recently exhibited her work I am the Vine, You are the Branches at St. Ann and the Holy Trinity Church, Brooklyn Heights, New York and Of leaves and vines . . . A shifting braid of lines at SACI Gallery in Florence, Italy. Azara has been included in notable exhibitions such as the traveling exhibition in 2006, How American Women Artists Invented Post-Modernism. Rutgers University, New Brunswick, New Jersey.

In 2004, she was commissioned by the Robert Wood Johnson Hospital in Hamilton, New Jersey to create a piece that honored the doctors’ service. The work stands 28 ft. (total) long x 6.5 ft. high x 8in. deep and is in a long corridor near both the operation room and the emergency room of the hospital.

In 2008-2009, she re-exhibited Heart Wall, a 24 ft. installation in the lobby of 340 Madison Avenue, New York, New York for 18 months.

In 2015 through August 8 – September 6, 2015, her exhibition Shifting Ecologies II, curated by Marianne Van Lentwas at The Athens Cultural Center.

In 2016 through October 1–30, 2016, her exhibition On Knowing Unknowing: A Material Narrative was at the Ortega y Gasset Projects.

In 2018 through October 7 – November 25, 2018, her exhibition Crossing Boundaries: Material As Message was at the RoCA, Rockland Center of the Arts.

In 2019 through January 18 – February 16, 2019, her exhibition Art on Paper was at the Brooklyn Gallery.

In 2019 through May 17 – June 30, 2019, her exhibition Labyrinths of the Mind was at the Woodstock Byrdcliffe Guild, Kleinert/James Center for the Arts. "An exhibition displaying artists withdrawing from the digital, media, and public fray within which we live to make their art out of their own mind experience."

In 2019 through August 24 – October 6, 2019, her exhibition The Meeting of the Birds was at the Kaaterskill Gallery. "Nancy Azara’s work in the upcoming exhibition, Meeting of the Birds, includes: seven mixed media works, collages on paper from the Crow and Sandal Series, three banners made with crow imagery, sized to the gallery’s windows; a series of sculptures carved in wood with steel, painted and gilded, and a selection of small paintings".

Her most recent exhibition, Ink: New Print was at the Brooklyn Gallery through January 31 – February 29, 2020. This exhibition shows the rapid changes of printmaking through the last three decades, including technological developments and modes of production.

== Awards ==
Azara received a fellowship from the Civitella Ranieri Foundation, Umbertide, Italy (2010); an Elan Lifetime Achievement Award from the Women's Studio Center (2004); a Chikraniketan Fellowship, Kovalam Junction, Kerala, South India (2001); a Bogliasco Foundation Fellowship, Genoa, Italy (2000) and a Susan B. Anthony Award from the National Organization for Women (NOW) (1994), among others.

In 2002, Azara authored the book Spirit Taking Form: Making a Spiritual Practice of Making Art.

== Teaching ==
Azara continued to teach workshops based on her development of “The Consciousness-Raising, Visual Diaries, Art Making” workshop at NYFAI. She also co-organized REPRESENT, a series of inter-generational dialogues to encourage discussion across generations about contemporary issues, for women in the arts and feminism(s) in the arts. The topics originate from the participants. Questions have included: What is feminist art? How should it be historicized? Personal definitions of “power” in your art, in life? How do you see yourself within the canon of white male artists? Everyone is welcome. She co-presented a paper on the topic with Katie Cercone at the 2012 CAA Conference in Los Angeles, "Necessary Positions: Intergenerational collaboration in feminist art and activism" and a panel Recovering a Lost Cultural Herstory 1969–1982: NYC Feminist Artists Speak Out, organized by Nancy Azara, Marjorie Kramer and Kay Turner with Prof. Aseel Sawalha, PhD, Assoc. Prof. of Anthropology at Fordham University.

== Feminism in Writing and Art ==
Azara has contributed to many publications on feminism and art including: "Our Journey to the New York Feminist Art Institute" (reprint) "In Pursuit of the Divine" in 2003, "Our Journey to the New York Feminist Art Institute." "Spirit Taking Form: Making a Spiritual Practice of Making Art" in 2002, "The Language of Art is Still Defined by Men" in 2015.

Starting her Feminism Art journey in the 1970's, she found an empowerment within by exploring feminism through consciousness raising sessions. Azara performed 'primitive' drawings and sculptures that went against her lessons in art school. Simple shapes and forms became her muse, "realizing they had emotional import as an expression in shapes and colors of the emotional dialogue taking place" Azara’s work records a journey of spirit, memory, and ideas around the unseen and the unknown, reflecting on time and mortality through facets of her personal history as a female artist.

“In 1970, I would rarely find women’s art in a public setting. When I did find women’s art in exhibits, it was a single artist’s work here and there, usually tucked in among the men’s work. It’s been a long struggle, but a heartening one to come to, to find so many women artists working, and showing, speaking in their art about their visions, their lives, translating into color and form their unique voices—making public their presence. We may not so easily realize it now, but considering millenniums of lack of recognition and rejection, making and showing art is a courageous act for women.”

Her works following the feminist agenda making sculptures, carving pieces of wood that are logs or milled lumber, ranging in size from 1 foot to 12 feet or more. The work is often gilded with metal leaf, painted with tempera, encaustic, and oils, stained and sometimes burned or bleached. These formal properties are the psychic outer layer. Within the psychic inner layer is the voice of my heart and what resides within it. Azara discusses the meaning of her artworks, which is about the nature of memory, yearning and desire. "All my work is about the brilliance of light, about the shadows and the darkness, about a history of what was, about the nature of memory, yearning, and desire".

The Orange Branch with Gold by Nancy Azara, 32" x 20" x 12," was carved and painted wood with gold leaf. It is a homage to the tree, with its treeness celebrated by a hot orange light presence.Tree Altar, 6"x 3" x 2", carved, painted wood with gold leaf, was made from a Christmas tree that was once chosen for its beauty. It had adorned someone's home, and was subsequently discarded. This sculpture retrieves it and endows it with interior beauty. Orange Branch with Gold and Tree Altar are about memory. They are memorial trees. The Circle with Seven Hands, 5" x 40," is a large, protected enclosure that implies a human presence, a great mother. Sometimes it was a dwelling, with a golden red sunset glow emanating from the inside. The Great Coat, 10"x 3" x 2," is a large, tall garment with the sense of a human having worn it, and having left its radiance in the coat, manifesting a spirit intrinsic to us all.

Her most recent work, the Crow and Sandal series of works on paper, the recurring motif of the crow acts as a symbolic messenger and metaphorical self-portrait, while the sandal (which in Hinduism represents a realization of the spiritual) functions as a symbol of the infinite. Here, as in other works, the images’ repetition suggests an attempt to examine and suspend their power in time and space.
