= Zarina (artist) =

Indian artist (1937–2020)

- Born: Zarina Rashid; 16 July 1937; Aligarh, United Provinces, British India
- Died: 25 April 2020 (aged 82); London, England
- Education: Atelier 17
- Website: zarina.work

Zarina Hashmi (née Rashid; 16 July 1937 – 25 April 2020), known professionally as Zarina, was an Indian American artist and printmaker based in New York City. Her work spans drawing, printmaking, and sculpture. Associated with the minimalist movement, her work utilized abstract and geometric forms in order to evoke a spiritual reaction from the viewer.

== Biography ==
Zarina Rashid was born on 16 July 1937 in Aligarh, India, to Sheikh Abdur Rashid, faculty at Aligarh Muslim University, and Fahmida Begum, a homemaker. Zarina earned a degree in mathematics, BS (Honors) from the Aligarh Muslim University in 1958. She then studied a variety of printmaking methods in Thailand, and at Atelier 17 studio in Paris, apprenticing to Stanley William Hayter, and with printmaker Tōshi Yoshida in Tokyo, Japan. She lived and worked in New York City.

During the 1980s, Zarina served as a board member of the New York Feminist Art Institute and an instructor of papermaking workshops at the affiliated Women's Center for Learning. While on the editorial board of the feminist art journal Heresies, she contributed to the "Third World Women" issue.

Zarina died in London from complications of Alzheimer's disease on 25 April 2020.

On 16 July 2023, a Google Doodle inspired by Zarina's works was published to commemorate what would have been her 86th birthday.

== Artistry ==
Zarina's art was informed by her identity as a Muslim-born Indian woman, as well as a lifetime spent traveling from place to place. She used visual elements from Islamic religious decoration, especially the regular geometry commonly found in Islamic architecture. The abstract and spare geometric style of her early works has been compared to that of minimalists such as Sol LeWitt.

Zarina's work explored the concept of home as a fluid, abstract space that transcends physicality or location. Her work often featured symbols that call to mind such ideas as movement, diaspora, and exile. For example, her woodblock print Paper Like Skin depicts a thin black line meandering upward across a white background, dividing the page from the bottom right corner to the top left corner. The line possesses a cartographic quality that, in its winding and angular division of the page, suggests a border between two places, or perhaps a topographical chart of a journey that is yet unfinished. For her Delhi series, she created a woodcut print based on an engraving of the city of Shajahanabad as it stood before the siege of 1857.

A major work addressing these themes is the 1999 portfolio Home Is a Foreign Place. It consists of thirty-six woodcuts with letterpress additions, each pairing a monochromatic geometric image with a single word in Urdu. Zarina selected terms connected with place and memory (including “home”, “threshold”, “distance”, and “border”) and had them written in Nastaliq script by a calligrapher in Pakistan. She then developed abstract images from the words, turning memories of her childhood house into a visual vocabulary of displacement, language, and belonging.

== Awards and fellowships ==
- 2007: Residency, University of Richmond, Richmond, Virginia
- 2006: Residency, Montalvo Arts Center, Saratoga, California
- 2002: Residency, Williams College, Williamstown, Massachusetts
- 1994: Residency, Art-Omi, Omi, New York
- 1991: Residency, Women's Studio Workshop, Rosendale, New York
- 1990: Adolph and Esther Gottlieb Foundation grant, New York Foundation for the Arts Fellowship
- 1989: Grand Prize, International Biennial of Prints, Bhopal, India
- 1985: New York Foundation for the Arts Fellowship, New York
- 1984: Printmaking Workshop Fellowship, New York
- 1974: Japan Foundation Fellowship, Tokyo
- 1969: President's Award for Printmaking, India

== Solo exhibitions ==
Year	Name of exhibition	Name of gallery	Place
2019–20	Zarina, A Life in Nine Lines	Kiran Nadar Museum of Art	New Delhi, India
2019–20	Zarina: Atlas of Her World	Pulitzer Arts Foundation	St. Louis, USA
2018	Zarina	Luhring Augustine	New York, USA
2018	Zarina: Weaving Darkness and Silence	Gallery Espace	New Delhi, India
2017–18	Zarina: Dark Roads	Asian/Pacific/American Institute at New York University	New York, USA
2016	Life Lines	Gallerie Jeanne Bucher Jaeger	Paris, France
2014	Zarina: Descending Darkness	Luhring Augustine	New York, USA
2014	Zarina: Folding House	Gallery Espace	New Delhi, India
2012–13	Zarina: Paper like Skin	Armand Hammer Museum of Art and Culture Centre	Los Angeles, USA
2012–13	Zarina: Paper like Skin	Solomon R. Guggenheim Museum	New York, USA
2012–13	Zarina: Paper like Skin	The Art Institute of Chicago	Chicago, USA
2011	Zarina Hashmi: Noor	Galerie Jaeger Bucher	Paris, France
2011	Zarina Hashmi: Recent Works, Gallery	Gallery Espace	New Delhi, India
2011	Zarina Hashmi: Anamnesis, 1970–1989	The Contemporary Art Gallery	Mumbai, India
2009	The Ten Thousand Things	Luhring Augustine	New York, USA
2007	Directions to My House	Shanghai Contemporary 07 Art Fair	Shanghai, China
2007	Zarina: Paper Houses	Gallery Espace	New Delhi, India
2007	Weaving Memory 1990–2006	Bodhi Art	Singapore
2006	Zarina: Silent Soliloquy	Bodhi Art	Singapore
2005	Zarina Counting, 1977-2005	Bose Pacia	New York, USA
2004	Cities, Countries and Borders, Prints by Zarina	Gallery Chemould	Mumbai, India
2004	Cities, Countries and Borders, Prints by Zarina	Gallery Espace	New Delhi, India
2004	Cities, Countries and Borders, Prints by Zarina	Chawkandi Gallery	Karachi, Pakistan
2004	Cities, Countries and Borders, Prints by Zarina	Gallery Rohtas 2	Lahore, Pakistan
2003	Maps, Homes and Itineraries	Gallery Lux	San Francisco, USA
2002	Home is a Foreign Place	Korn Gallery, Drew University	Madison, New Jersey
2001	Zarina, Mapping a Life, 1991–2001	Mills College Art Museum	Oakland, USA
2000	Home is a Foreign Place, Admit One	Gallery Espace	New York, USA
2000	Home is a Foreign Place, Admit One	Chawkandi Gallery	Karachi, Pakistan
1994	Homes I Made	Faculty Gallery	University of California, Santa Cruz
1993		Chawkandi Gallery	Karachi, Pakistan
1992	House with Four Walls	Bronx Museum of the Arts	New York, USA
1990	Zarina: Recent Work; Bronze, Cast Paper, Etchings	Roberta English Gallery	San Francisco, USA
1985	Zarina Hashmi: Paper Works	Art Heritage	New Delhi, India
1985	Zarina Hashmi: Paper Works	Chitrakoot Gallery	Calcutta, India
1985	Zarina Hashmi: Paper Works	Gallery Cymrosa	Bombay, India
1985	Zarina Hashmi: Paper Works	Chawkandi Gallery	Karachi, Pakistan
1983		Satori Gallery	San Francisco, USA
1981	Zarina: Cast Paper Works	Hebert F. Johnson Museum of Art, Cornell University	Ithaca, New York, USA
1981	Zarina: Recent Cast Paper Works	Orion Editions	New York, USA
1977		Gallery Alana	Oslo, Norway
1976		India Ink Gallery	Los Angeles, USA
1974	Zarina: Screenprints, Tapestries	Triveni Kala Sangam	New Delhi, India
1974	Serigraphs by Zarina	India Ink Gallery	Los Angeles, USA
1973	Zarina: Woodprints	India Ink Gallery	Los Angeles, USA
1972		Chanakya Gallery	New Delhi, India
1972		Gallery F-15, Jeløya	Moss, Norway
1971		Chanakya Gallery	New Delhi, India
1971		Cultural Centre Ora	Athens, Greece
1970	Graphics by Zarina	Pundole Art Gallery	Bombay, India
1969		Gallery Chanakya	New Delhi, India
1968		Kunika-Chemould Art Centre	New Delhi, India

== Selected exhibitions ==
Zarina was one of four artists/artist-groups to represent India in its first entry at the Venice Biennale in 2011.

The Hammer Museum in Los Angeles organized the first retrospective of her work in 2012. Entitled Zarina: Paper Like Skin, the exhibition traveled to the Solomon R. Guggenheim Museum and the Art Institute of Chicago.

In 2016, the Metropolitan Museum of Art presented Workshop and Legacy: Stanley William Hayter, Krishna Reddy, Zarina Hashmi that examined their professional collaboration.

During the 2017–18 academic year, Zarina was the Artist-in-Residence at the Asian/Pacific/American Institute at NYU. The residency culminated in a solo exhibition, Zarina: Dark Roads (6 October 2017 – 2 February 2018) and a publication, Directions to My House.

Examples of her work are in the permanent collections of the Museum of Modern Art, the Whitney Museum of American Art, the Menil Collection, the National Gallery of Art, and the Bibliothèque nationale de France.
