= Gardello Dano Christensen =

American writer (1907–1991)

- Born: 1907 Fremont County, Wyoming, U.S.
- Died: 1991 (aged 83–84)
- Occupation: Writer
- Spouse: Eugenia Burney

Gardell Dano Christensen (1907, Fremont County, Wyoming – 1991) was an American writer who lived in Dubois, Wyoming, with his wife, author Eugenia Burney.

== Bibliography ==
- Colonial Delaware (1974). Nashville, TN: Thomas Nelson. ISBN 0-8407-7118-5. Co-author Eugenia Burney.
- Home Port Revisited: Stories and poems (1970). San Pedro, CA: Double-A Printing Co. Co-author Marion Reel.
- Colonial New York (1969). Camden, NJ: Thomas Nelson.
- Buffalo Horse (1961). New York: Thomas Nelson.
- The Buffalo Robe (1960). New York: Thomas Nelson.
- Buffalo Kill (1959). New York: Thomas Nelson.

=== Children's books ===
- Mrs. Mouse Needs a House (1958). New York: Henry Holt.
- Chuck Woodchuck's Secret (1957). New York: Henry Holt.
- All on a Mountain Day (1956). New York: Thomas Nelson. Co-author Aileen Lucia Fisher.
- Mr. Hare (1956). New York: Henry Holt.
- The Fearless Family (1955). New York: Henry Holt.
- Monkeys (1955). New York: Morrow. Co-author Herbert Spencer Zim.
- Duff, the Story of a Bear (1950). New York: D. McKay. Co-author William Marshall Rush.
