= New York Feminist Art Institute =

Non profit organization

- Abbreviation: NYFAI
- Formation: June 1979
- Founders: Nancy Azara, Miriam Schapiro, Selena Whitefeather, Lucille Lessane, Irene Peslikis and Carol Stronghilos
- Dissolved: 1990
- Type: Non profit organization
- Purpose: School, community and gallery for women artists
- Location(s): 325 Spring Street, New York (1979–1985) and 91 Franklin Street, New York (1985–1990)
- Coordinates: 40°43′4.73″N 74°0′17.97″W
- Main organ: Board of directors/ Collective
- Website: www.nyfai.org

New York Feminist Art Institute (NYFAI) was founded in 1979 by women artists, educators and professionals and ran until 1990. NYFAI offered workshops and classes, held performances and exhibitions and special events that contributed to the political and cultural impact of the women's movement at the time.

The women's art school focused on self-development and discovery as well as art. Nancy Azara introduced "visual diaries" to artists to draw and paint images that arose from consciousness-raising classes and their personal lives. In the first half of the 1980s the school was named the Women's Center for Learning and it expanded its artistic and academic programs. Ceres Gallery was opened in 1985 after the school moved to TriBeCa and, like the school, it catered to women artists. NYFAI participated in protests to increase women's art shown at the Museum of Modern Art, The Whitney Museum of American Art and other museums. It held exhibitions and workshops and provided rental and studio space for women artists. Unable to secure sufficient funding to continue its operations, NYFAI closed in 1990. Ceres Gallery moved to SoHo and then to Chelsea and remained a gallery for women's art. However, a group continues to meet called (RE)PRESENT, a series of intergenerational dialogues at a NYC gallery to encourage discussion across generations about contemporary issues for women in the arts. It is open to all.

== History ==
New York Feminist Art Institute opened in June 1979 at 325 Spring Street in the Port Authority Building. The founding members and the initial board of directors were Nancy Azara, Miriam Schapiro, Selena Whitefeather, Lucille Lessane, Irene Peslikis and Carol Stronghilos. A board of advisers was established of accomplished artists, educators and professional women. For instance, feminist writer and arts editor at Ms. Magazine Harriet Lyons was an adviser from its start.

Drawing upon the Feminist art movement, the founders sought to create a community to support women artists. The organization provided a framework for members, for analyzing the development of their work, within the social and psychological contexts of their gender identity.

The Joint Foundation provided a grant that allowed the organization to operate initially. The American Stock Exchange, The Eastman Fund, America the Beautiful Fund, RCA, the Ford Foundation and the NEA also provided grants to the organization. It held biannual open houses and annual benefits to raise funds. One of the earliest was very successful and had Louise Nevelson as a guest of honor. Open house honorees were Alice Neel, Elaine de Kooning, Vivian Browne, Louise Bourgeois, Lenore Tawney, Faith Ringgold, Nancy Spero, Elizabeth Murray and The Guerrilla Girls among others.

In April 1981 the organization held a weekend conference "Political Consciousness/ Political Action: Dialogues and Strategies for the 80s" to help women gain a greater sense of personal power and discover ways to engage in the political process.

In 1984 NYFAI moved to a new location on Franklin Street in TriBeCa. This new location had gallery space for the cooperative Ceres Gallery, additional space for its school and had rental studio and storage space for artists.

In 1984 they co-sponsored a Museum of Modern Art protest, "Women Artists Visibility Event" with the Women's Interart Center, the Heresies Collective, and the Women's Caucus for Art's New York chapter. They protested the few numbers of women in MoMA's grand-reopening and "An International Survey of Recent Painting and Sculpture" exhibition; Of 165 exhibitors, only 14 of them were women. Buttons with the statement, "The Museum of Modern Art Opens but Not to Women," were worn by 400 protesters.

The Institute, which had struggled with ensuring it had sufficient funding for some time, shut down its operations by 1991. Rutgers University Libraries received its library and archives. The non-profit Ceres Gallery moved in 1992 to SoHo and then Chelsea at 547 West 27th Street.

== Women's Center for Learning/ New York Feminist Art Institute ==
The Art Institute focused on self-discovery and art education. First years students participated in consciousness-raising classes developed by Nancy Azara where students created "visual diaries" by recording their feelings and thoughts by writing, painting or writing words into art journals. It taught the history of anthropology and art and feminist theory. Art studies included drawing, sculpture, and painting. It was a program that required inspiration and self-motivation, students did not have grades. Performance was measured by teachers assessments and student self-assessments. Students were offered the opportunity to work as apprentices with professional artists. Part-time students attended weekend workshops and evening courses.

The school added the title the "Women's Center for Learning" in the early 1980s. Focused on personal development, it added writing and psychology classes. Its art program was expanded to include basketry, puppetry, printmaking, papermaking, poetry, filmmaking and much more.

Harmony Hammond, Louise Fishman, Arlene Raven, Barbara Hammer, Elke Solomon, Sarah Draney and Zarina Hashmi were instructors and Leila Daw, Faith Ringgold, May Stevens and Darla Bjork taught weekend workshops at the school.

The school closed in 1990.

== Ceres Gallery ==
Ceres Gallery is a feminist, not-for-profit, alternative gallery in New York City, dedicated to the promotion of contemporary women in the arts. It provides an exhibition space intended to increase public awareness of women's art and to address women's historically limited access to commercial galleries. The gallery also serves as a space for a range of artistic and political views. Over the years Ceres has encouraged not only artists but writers, musicians, dancers, poets and storytellers to perform in the gallery. According to the gallery, its members regard the arts as an important social service, holding that art has the capacity to educate and to enrich people's lives.

Ceres provides a showcase for women artists regardless of age, artistic style or commercial viability to exhibit their work in New York City, many for the first time. All work meets professional standards of excellence but is not restricted in style, medium or theme. Through its progressive programing, the Gallery has become a gathering place for educational and community activities and in addition to providing the general public with a place to expand their knowledge of contemporary art is also a place for women artists to gather for support and friendship. Many artistic and political events are presented throughout the year with participation by gallery artists, artists not affiliated with the gallery and others from the larger arts community. The gallery operates as a cooperative which means members vote on all decisions including the review of possible new members and they participate in monthly meetings to plan the overall direction of the gallery. In addition, Ceres has a professional Director, Stefany Benson, to facilitate the smooth running of all programs and exhibitions. Currently, Ceres has a roster of showing artists from the New York metropolitan area and from across the country with a small number from countries outside the U.S.

Ceres Gallery was founded in 1984 by Rhonda Schaller, Polly Lai and Darla Bjork, and Regina Corritore in conversation with NYFAI director, artist Nancy Azara as a program of the New York Feminist Art Institute (NYFAI, 1979–1990). Early members included: Carol Goebel, Phyllis Rosser, Joan Arbeiter, Sandra Branch, Regina Corritore, and Vivian Tsao. The gallery was first located at 91 Franklin Street in Tribeca on the ground floor of the building which housed the New York Feminist Art Institute (NYFAI). Large salon style shows, joint exhibitions and others were held yearly such as: “Reflections: Women in Their Own Image” and “Heroic Female: Images of Power.” In 1993 it moved to 584 Broadway in SoHo where it remained until 2003. Ceres Gallery has 2000+ square feet in one of Chelsea's premier art destination buildings, The Landmark Arts Building, 547 West 27th Street. Members still at Ceres include Carol Goebel, Phyllis Rosser, Regina Corritore, and Vivian Tsao.

In 2024 Ceres Gallery celebrated its 40th anniversary. It has fifty artists from the New York metropolitan area, across the United States, and other countries.

2024 Artists include:
Mary Ahern,
Marilyn Banner,
Marcy Bernstein,
Jo-Ann Brody,
Rae Broyles,
Elizabeth Myers Castonguay,
Regina Corritore,
Pat Cresson,
Elizabeth DeMayo,
Anne Drager,
Hagar Fletcher,
Nina Fletcher,
Pamela Flynn,
Jayne Gaskins,
Carol Goebel,
Susan Grabel,
Judith Greenwald,
Melanie Hickerson,
Hollis Hildebrand-Mills,
Minako Ito,
Carla Rae Johnson,
Nancy Kahlow-Curtis,
Susan Kaplow,
Tania Kravath,
Carole Kulikowski,
Heidi Kumao,
Linda Kunik,
Libbet Loughnan,
Virginia Mallon,
Child Maloff,
Lynne Maypole,
Anne Mondro,
Christine Mottau,
Nishimura,
Liz Ndoye,
Mary Alice Orito,
Francine Perlman,
Nancy Quin,
Elizabeth Downer Riker,
Yu Rong,
Phyllis Rosser,
Jane Seavers,
Ann R. Shapiro,
Pamela Shields Roule,
Shirley Steele,
Jane Stevens,
Michelle Stone,
Kathlene Tracy,
Vivian Tsao,
Carlyle Upson,
Micaela de Vivero
Judy Werlin.

== Exhibitions ==
- 1981 - "Transformations," New York Coliseum NYFAI curators: Judith Chiti, Catherine Allen and Linda Hill.
- 1985 - "Reflection: Women in Their Own Image"
- 1986 - "The Heroic Female: Images of Power"
- 1987 - "The Political is Personal"
- 1988 - "Work of the Spirit"
- 1989 - "Beyond Survival: Old Frontiers, New Visions"
- 1990 - "Memory/Reality"
