= National Museum of Military Vehicles =

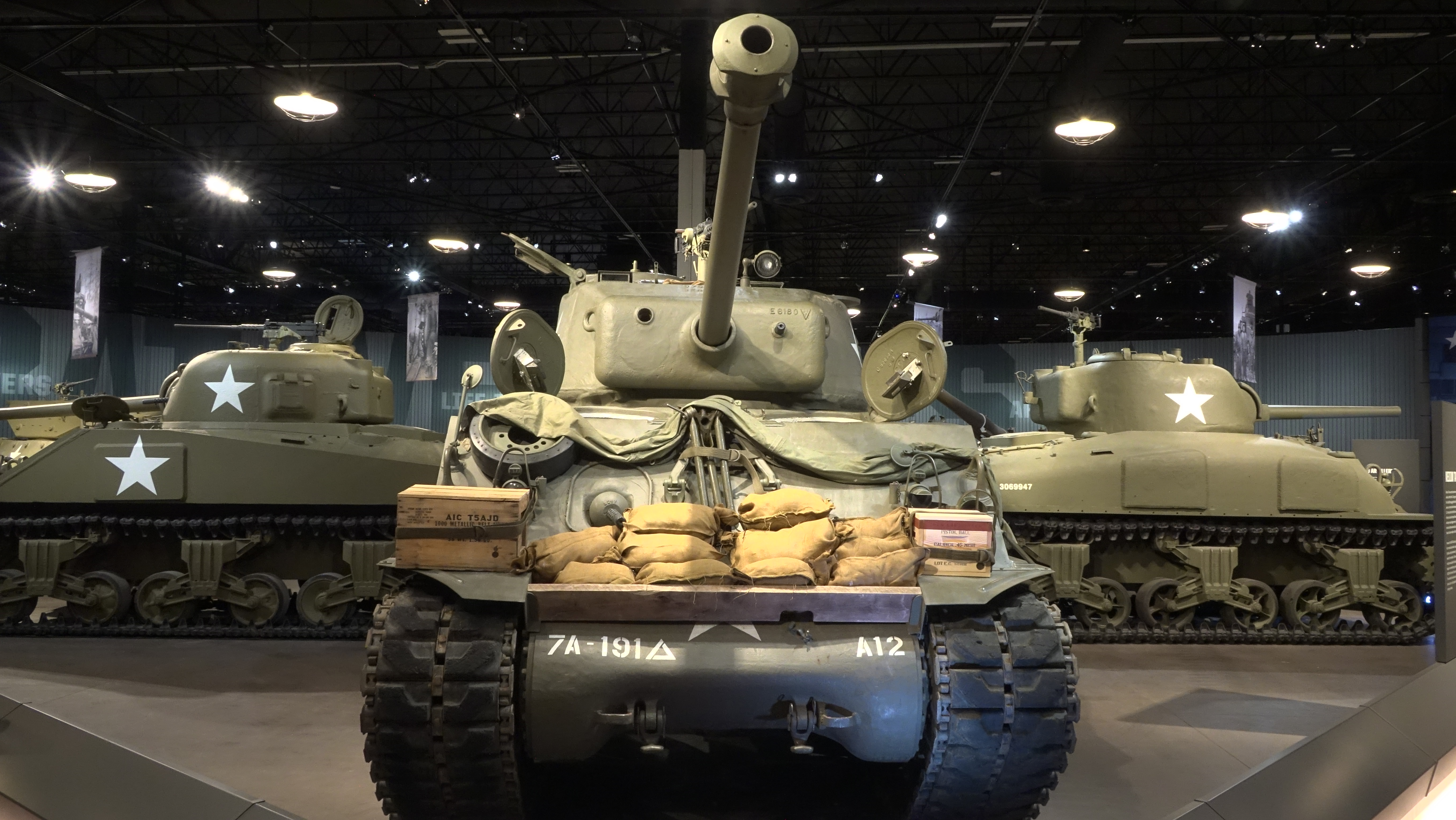
- M4 Medium Tank on display at the National Museum of Military Vehicles

- Location within the United States
- Established: 2020
- Location: 6419 US Highway 26 Dubois, Wyoming 82513
- Coordinates: 43°28′24.61″N 109°29′46.43″W
- Type: Military history museum
- Founder: Dan Starks
- Public transit access: No
- Website: www.nmmv.org

The National Museum of Military Vehicles is a military history museum in Dubois, Wyoming.

Established in 2020, the 160,000-square-foot (15,000 m^{2}) museum was founded by Dan and Cynthia Starks and built between May 2017 and August 2020. More than 500 military vehicles and a significant firearms collection are on display at the museum along with other artifacts. Starks, a former lawyer and medical industry CEO, funded the $100 million museum.

Items on display include hardware ranging from the Spanish American War up until the Iraq War and War in Afghanistan (2001-2021). The museum contains four main galleries and an outdoor "Wall of Reflection".

A second major building on campus, The Poolaw Building, opened in September 2022. The building is named after First Lieutenant Pascal C. Poolaw Sr., who served with the United States Army in World War II, the Korean War, and the Vietnam War. He is the United States' most decorated Native American, with 42 medals and citations, including four Silver Stars, five Bronze Stars, as well as three Purple Hearts – one for each war.

The tour begins in the Unknown Soldiers Weapons Vault, whose main attraction is the rifle used to fire the first shots at the Battle of Bunker Hill. Guests will also find the Karl Smith collection - a world-class, extensive review of U.S. bayonets, muskets and swords; an Assembly Room with high-tech audio and video and seating for up to 500; The Canteen, a restaurant for guests; a commercial kitchen and administrative offices.

In 2023, the National Museum of Military Vehicles has received awards such as the TripAdvisor "Traveler's Choice" award for two years in a row and has received increased media coverage.
