= Suzanne Hoyt =

American equestrian and philanthropist

Suzanne Kate Hoyt (1934–2010) was an American equestrian and rancher. Hoyt won her first equestrian award at age five. During her equestrian career, she won several other titles and qualified for the Olympics. In 1950, she captured three blue ribbons and the hunter seat championship at the Rock Spring Horse Show. That September, she also earned an award for horsemanship at an event run by the New Jersey chapter of the Society for the Prevention of Cruelty to Animals.

== Early life and education ==
Hoyt was born in South Orange, New Jersey on August 13, 1934. She graduated from the Beard School in Orange, New Jersey (now Morristown-Beard School) in 1952. Hoyt served as class president during all four years of high school. During her senior year, she represented the Beard School at a national Presbyterian Youth Conference. Hoyt then attended Mount Holyoke College in South Hadley, Massachusetts and Finch College in Manhattan.

== Philanthropy for colleges and universities ==
Hoyt gave money to fund the Christian Brothers Scholarship Fund at the College of Santa Fe (now the Santa Fe University of Art and Design), the Simmons Scholarship Fund at Santa Fe Community College and the Golden Apple Scholarship Fund. Recognizing the impact of this philanthropy, Hoyt received election to the Board of Trustees of the College of Santa Fe. Serving for four years, she achieved acclaim as the first woman president of the board. In 1988, the College of Santa Fe awarded Hoyt an honorary Doctorate of Humane Letters.

== Affordable housing ==
Hoyt donated to the Property Tax Assistance Fund at the Santa Fe Community Foundation. Providing affordable housing for families in need, she also donated land for 50 sites known as Old Las Vegas Place.

== Board service ==
Hoyt served on the board of directors of the Maternal and Child Health Center and received election to president. She also served on the board of directors of the School of American Research, the Acequia Madre parent-teacher association, the Santa Fe Chamber Music Festival, the Santa Fe Boys Club, the New Mexico Children's Foundation, the Santa Fe Community Foundation, and the Santa Fe chapter of Planned Parenthood.

== Ranching ==
In 1960, Hoyt and her husband purchased a cattle ranch in Santa Fe known as old Buckman Ranch. (The ranch goes by the name Santa Fe Ranch today.) They subdivided the front areas of the ranch during the 1970s to create a subdivision known as La Tierra. La Tierra represented an example of one of the first environmentally sensitive developments in New Mexico.

== Honors and recognition ==
In 1991, The Santa Fe New Mexican, a newspaper, named Hoyt as "One of Ten Who Make Santa Fe a Better Place". The National Society of Fund Raising Executives awarded her their Outstanding Philanthropist of the Year Award in 1998. In 1995, New Mexico State University awarded her an honorary doctorate in law.
