= Chalda Maloff =

German-American artist

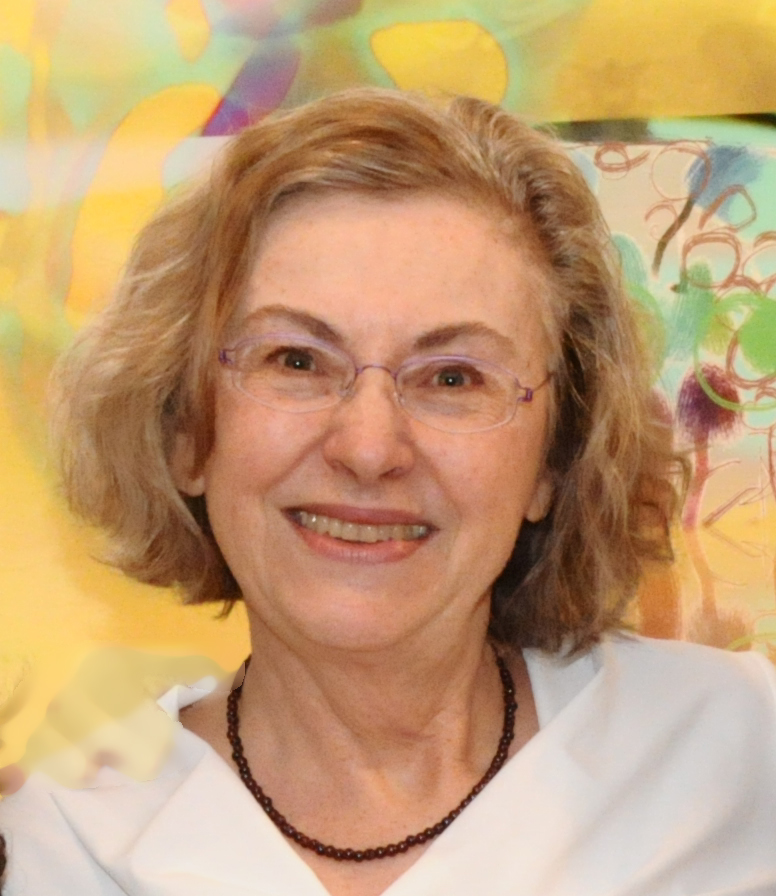
- Born: 1946 (age 79–80); Frankfurt am Main, Germany
- Education: University of California at Berkeley
- Alma mater: University of Texas School of Public Health
- Movement: Digital painting
- Awards: Barbara Jordan Media Award; 1988

Chalda Maloff (born 1946, Frankfurt am Main, Germany) is an author and contemporary artist raised in the United States. Her artwork has been exhibited throughout North and South America and in Europe. She has received awards from the Butler Institute of American Art, the Visual Arts Society of Texas, and other arts institutions. She has authored two books, including Business and Social Etiquette with Disabled People (1988). She received the Barbara Jordan Media Award, sponsored by the Texas Governor's Office in 1988.

== Early life and education ==
The daughter of Tania Maloff and Sasha Maloff, she grew up in California attending the Castilleja School and later in Nevada. She holds a Bachelor of Arts in Art History and a Master of Science in Computer Science from the University of California at Berkeley, and a Doctorate in Human Ecology from the University of Texas School of Public Health. She is married to Russell Zears.

== Studio art ==
Maloff's aesthetic style is characterized by geometric compositions, the illusion of back lighting, transparencies, and spatial ambiguity. She has worked in various artistic media, including aquatint, ceramics, oils, and acrylics. However, since 2002 she has devoted herself almost entirely to the medium of digital painting.

Her work has been exhibited in several solo exhibitions, including a show in August 2007 at the Thomas Knight Gallery in California, in 2010 in Virtuous Realities at the Jung Center in Texas, and also in 2014 at Mill and Leaf in the Arboretum in Austin, TX.

At the VIII Salón de Arte Digital, Museo de Arte Contemporáneo del Zulia in Maracaibo, Venezuela, her work was commended by the jurors for its “poetic abstract expression and purity of execution.”

In 2008 her work was included in the inaugural exhibit of the Museum of Computer Art in New York City.

Maloff is a member of Ceres Gallery, an artist-run organization in New York City dedicated to the promotion of contemporary women in the arts.

== Literary work ==
Chalda Maloff is the author of Business and Social Etiquette with Disabled People. The book has been credited in several publications such as Living with Disabilities: 6 Volume Basic Manuals for Friends of the Disabled by Hannah Carlson and Dale Bick Carlson. Maloff's book was also reviewed in the Houston Chronicle, Journal of Visual Impairment and Blindness, the Houston Business Journal, and Successful Meetings. Maloff's publication was endorsed by the National Easter Seals (U.S.) Society and dozens of other national institutions for disability advocacy. From the entertainment community, the book was endorsed by musician George Shearing, and actor Raymond Burr. The foreword was written by singer Mel Tillis.

Maloff is also the author of a graduate level textbook entitled Computers in Nutrition that has been referenced in the Journal of Parenteral & Enteral Nutrition, and a seminal article on computer music composition and performance, The Fourth B, published in SIGART, a publication for the Association for Computing Machinery (Issue 54).

In 1981, Chalda Maloff published a paper entitled, A Study of the Relationship Between Self-Assessment and Clinical Evaluation of Hearing Status on the study of the relationship between self-assessment and clinical evaluation of the hearing status.
