= Ramshorn Peak =

Mountain in Wyoming, United States

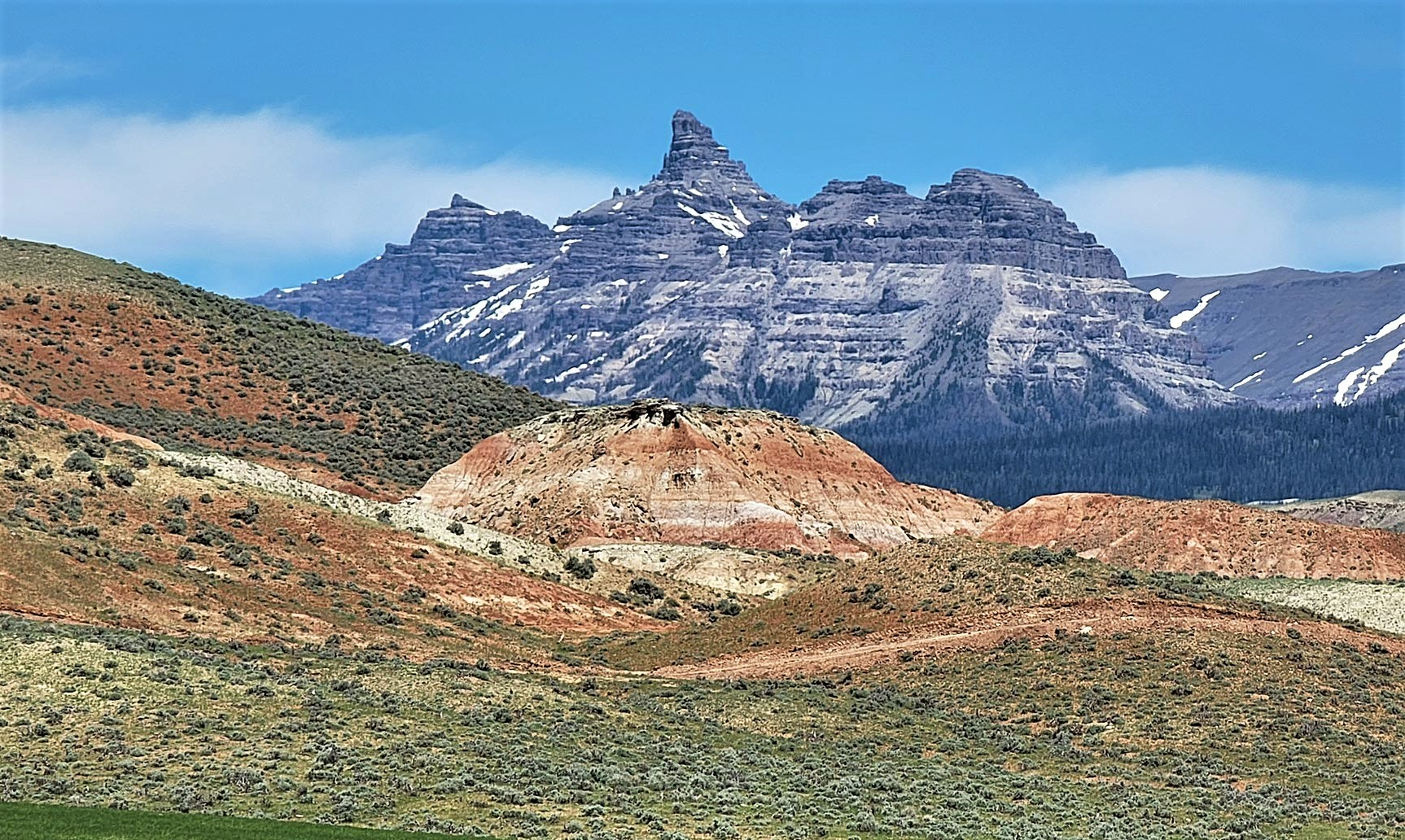
- South aspect

Highest point
- Elevation: 11,635 ft (3,546 m)
- Prominence: 515 ft (157 m)
- Parent peak: Peak 11841
- Isolation: 2.29 mi (3.69 km)
- Coordinates: 43°43′20″N 109°43′37″W

Naming
- Etymology: Ram's horn

Geography
- Location within Wyoming Location within the United States
- Location: Fremont County, Wyoming, U.S.
- Parent range: Absaroka Range; Rocky Mountains
- Topo map: USGS Ramshorn Peak

Geology
- Rock type(s): volcanic breccia, conglomerate

Climbing
- First ascent: 1960
- Easiest route: class 5 North ridge

Ramshorn Peak is an 11,635-foot-elevation (3,546-meter) mountain summit located in Fremont County of Wyoming, United States.

== Description ==
The peak is situated approximately 16 miles east of the Continental Divide in the Absaroka Range. It is set in the Washakie Wilderness, on land managed by Shoshone National Forest. Topographic relief is significant as both the east and west aspects rise 2,000 feet (610 meters) in one-half mile. The nearest town is Dubois, Wyoming, 16 miles to the south-southeast, and the peak is a conspicuous landmark seen from U.S. Route 26 / U.S. 287. The mountain's name has been officially adopted by the United States Board on Geographic Names, and was in use in 1914 when published in an USGS bulletin. The first ascent of the summit was made July 13, 1960, by H. & Mrs. Kellogg.

== Climate ==
According to the Köppen climate classification system, Ramshorn Peak is located in an alpine subarctic climate zone with cold, snowy winters, and cool to warm summers. Due to its altitude, it receives precipitation all year, as snow in winter, and as thunderstorms in summer. Precipitation runoff from the mountain drains into tributaries of the Wind River.

== See also ==
- List of mountain peaks of Wyoming

== Gallery ==
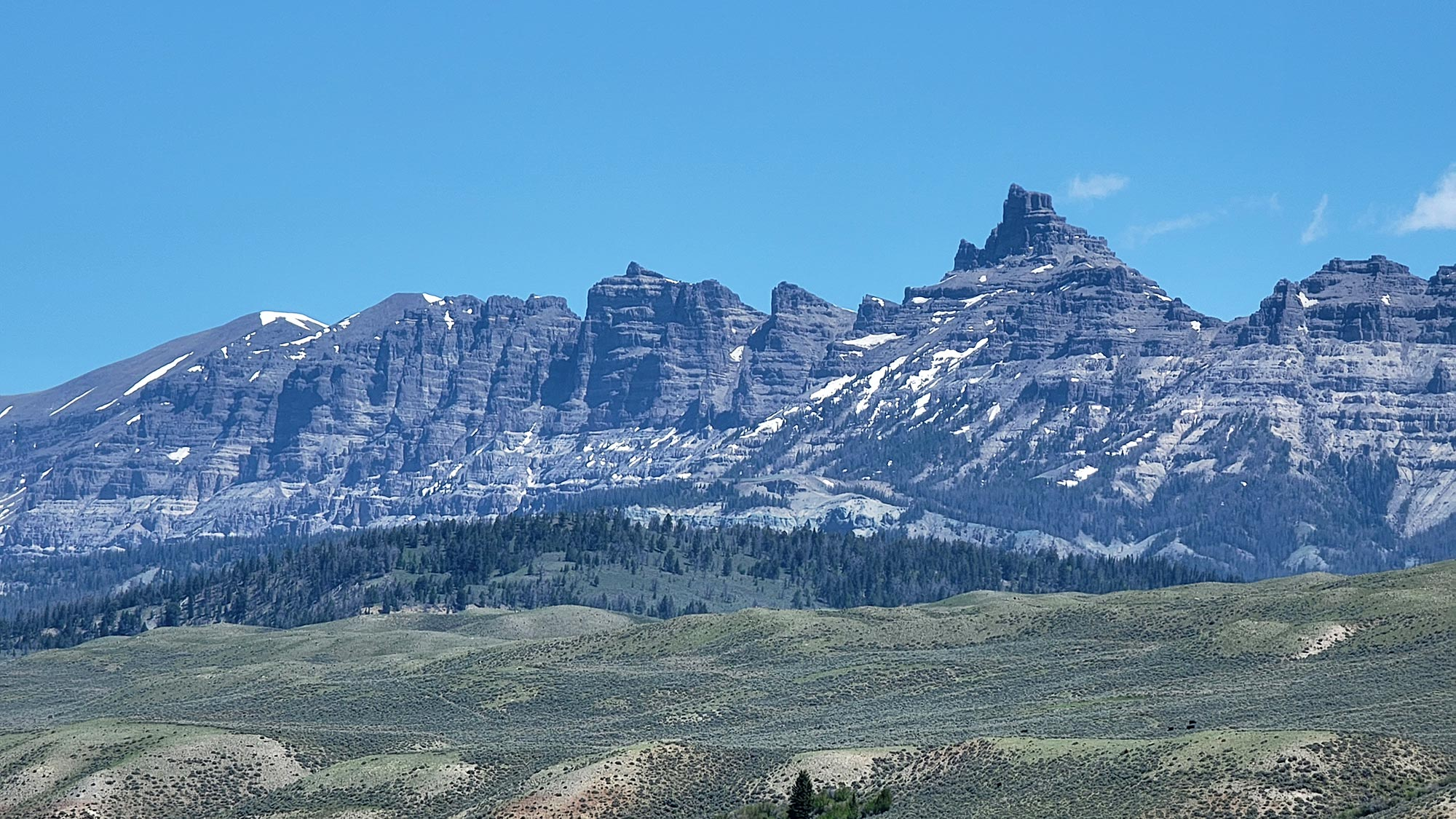
Ramshorn Peak from SSW at Union Pass, zoomed in

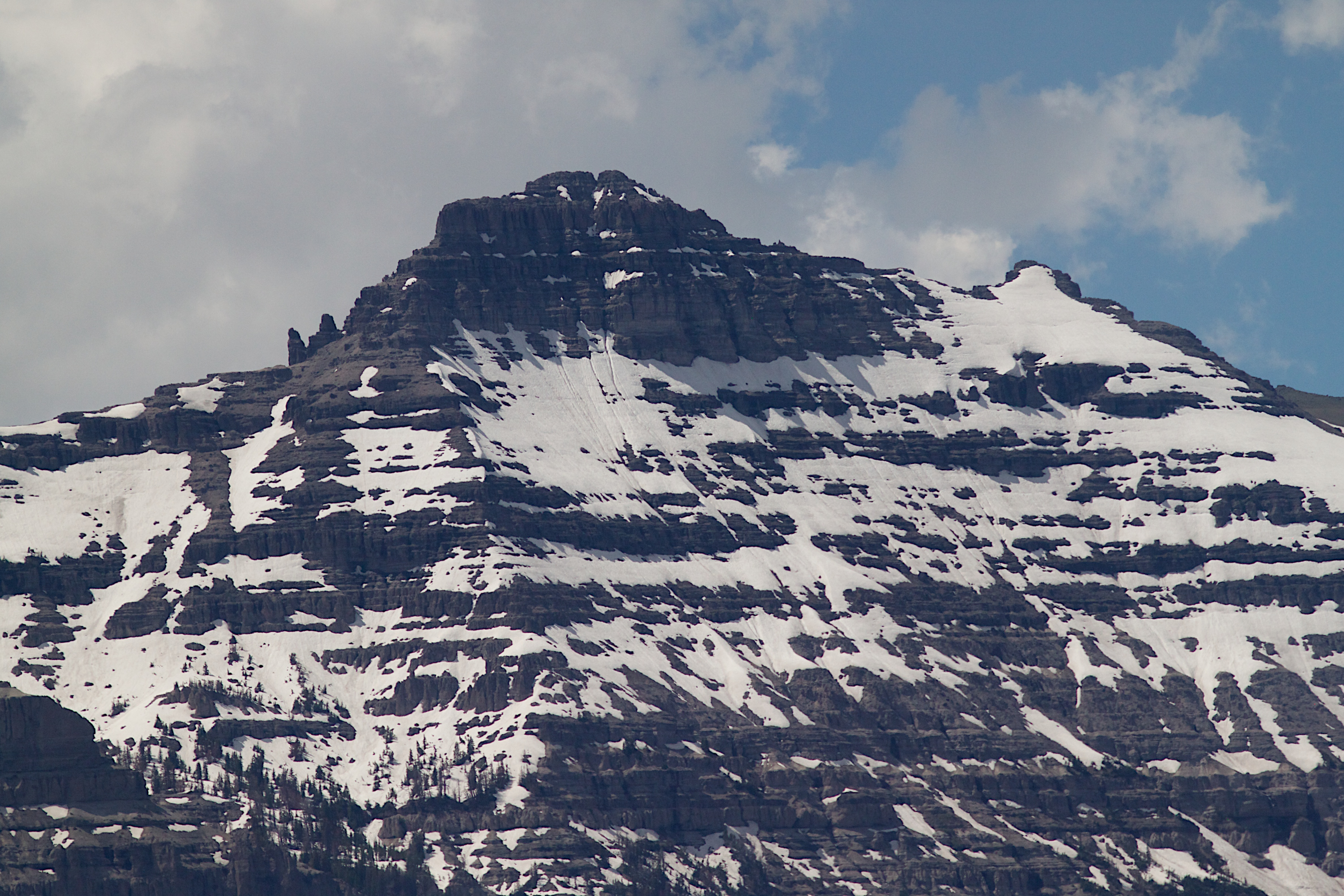
Southeast aspect

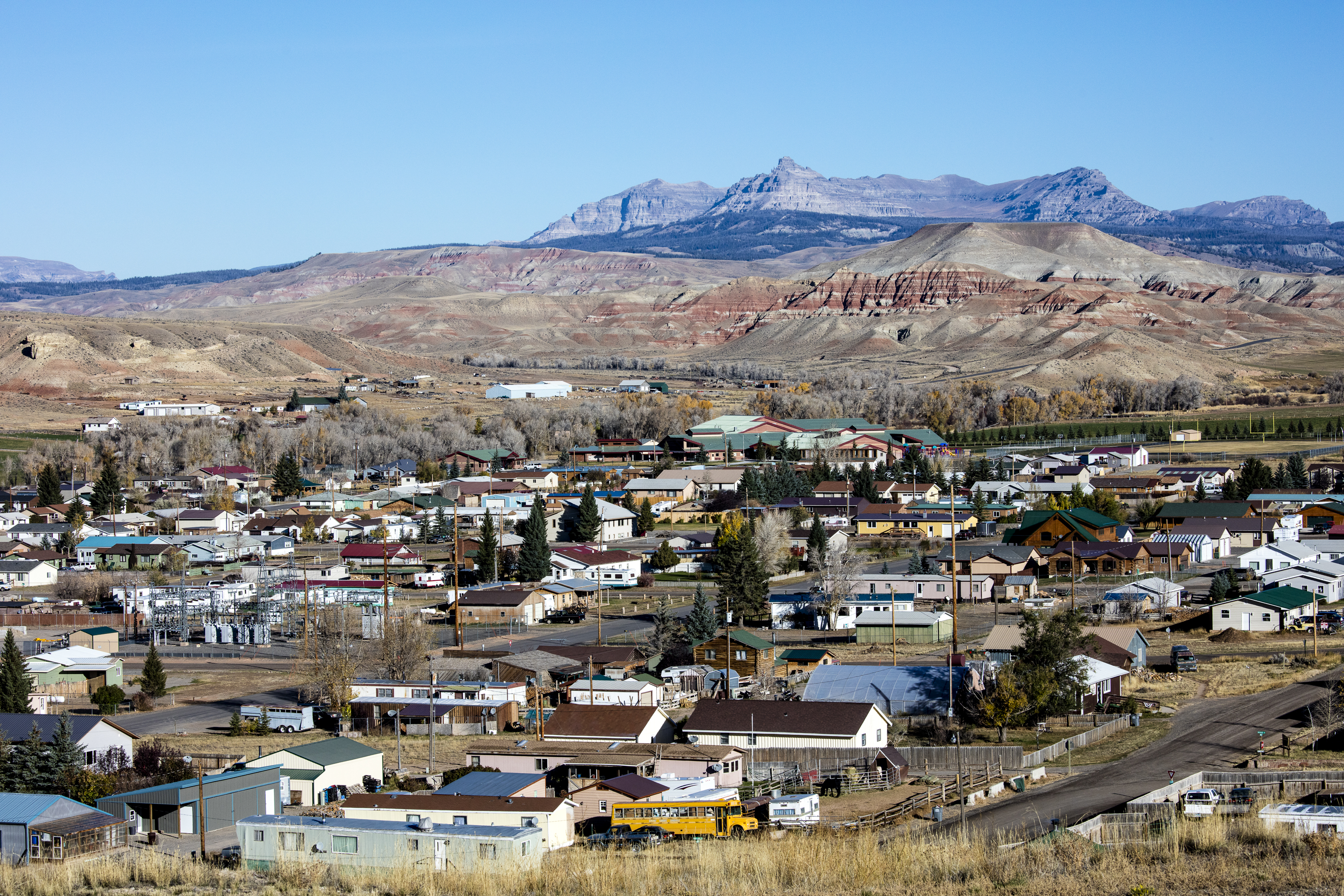
Dubois with Ramshorn Peak to the north
