= Finch College =

Former women's college in New York City

Coordinates: 40.7754°N 73.9619°W

- Upper East Side, Manhattan, New York

Information
- Type: baccalaureate women's college
- Established: 1900 (secondary school); 1952 (baccalaureate institution)

Finch College was an undergraduate women's college in Manhattan, New York City. The Finch School opened as a private secondary school for girls in 1900 and became a liberal arts college in 1952. It closed in 1976.

== Founding ==
Finch was founded in 1900 as The Finch School by Jessica Garretson Finch (née Garretson, later Cosgrave; 1871–1949), an alumna of Barnard College and New York University. She was a prominent women's rights activist and socialist.

Finch believed that the education she had received at Barnard College had not prepared her for a vocational life, so she decided to open a school to emphasize practical education. She developed a curriculum that was strongly based on both the liberal arts and hands-on learning, with special emphasis on workshops and studio art lessons.

Showing her desire to mix the theoretical with the practical, Finch hired a diverse faculty for the school. In addition to faculty from nearby Columbia University, Finch hired actors, fashion designers, politicians, poets, musicians, and other individuals working in the New York City area.

== Location ==
Finch was located on Manhattan's Upper East Side, an area of wealthy residents and one of the most expensive real estate districts in the United States. Nearby women's colleges included Marymount Manhattan College and Hunter College, both of which became coed in the cultural shift of the 1960s. The college's campus consisted of a grouping of townhouses on East 78th Street, between Madison Avenue and Park Avenue.

The Finch campus housed several resources for the public, including the Finch College Museum of Art and the Little Lenox Theatre.

Since Finch College closed in 1976, most of its former campus has been used by the Ramaz School, a Modern Orthodox Jewish preparatory school.

== The college ==
In 1952, Finch began offering a four-year college curriculum in most liberal arts fields, leading to a bachelor's degree. Finch was noted for its international focus and diversity among learning levels. Many students came from abroad, often from high-income areas. In 1960, the college launched its study abroad program, the Finch Intercontinental Study Plan. It also offered special tuition assistance and tutoring to students from minority and lower-class backgrounds.

In its later years, the college was best known for its strong art program. Several noted artists, including Edmond Casarella and Hedda Sterne, taught courses or displayed at the college. Finch established the Finch College Museum of Art in 1959. It has published more than 100 books on art, especially art history.

== Closure ==
By 1970, Finch, like most other women's colleges, was struggling to attract students against the competition of the coeducation movement that began in the 1960s. It had fewer than 400 students, and applications declined in the period following the Vietnam War. Many families sought more diverse schools.

Although Finch had maintained its tuition among the highest in the country, reflecting its traditional status as a school for young women from wealthy backgrounds, the college's endowment was too small to generate sufficient income to support its operation. It was not successful in attracting federal funding to subsidize tuition for lower-income students, nor could it merge with another college.

In 1975, Finch's president, Rodney O. Felder, announced his intent to close the college. Finch formally closed the next year, passing its student records to Marymount Manhattan College.

== Alumnae ==
In 1993, the Finch College Alumnae Association (FCAA) was founded in order to preserve the college's history and provide fellowship for alumnae. In addition to traditional alumni services, the FCAA Foundation offers scholarships to students transferring from community colleges in New York, New Jersey, and Connecticut to baccalaureate institutions.

=== Notable alumnae ===
- Nancy Azara, NYC artist, sculpture and collage
- Stephanie Brody-Lederman, painter, book artist, and sculptor
- Anne Cox Chambers, primary owner of Cox Enterprises
- Lois Chiles, actor and former fashion model
- Marjorie Content, photographer and bookstore owner
- Kathleen Cavendish, Marchioness of Hartington, sister of U.S. President John F. Kennedy
- Tricia Nixon Cox, daughter of U.S. President Richard Nixon
- Arlene Francis, actress, radio and television talk show host, and panelist on What's My Line?
- Pegeen Vail Guggenheim, painter
- Suzanne Hoyt, equestrian
- Caroline Howard Hume, philanthropist and art collector
- Marion Jorgensen, civic leader and philanthropist
- Connie Kemmerer, businessperson and philanthropist
- Joan Whitney Kramer, singer/songwriter
- Francine LeFrak, businessperson and philanthropist
- Felicia Meyer, artist
- Suzanne Pleshette, actor and co-star of The Bob Newhart Show
- Patsy Pulitzer (1928–2011), model, socialite and philanthropist
- Isabella Rossellini, Italian actress, model, author, and daughter of actress Ingrid Bergman and film director Roberto Rossellini
- Grace Slick, rock musician, member of the Jefferson Airplane and Jefferson Starship (transferred to University of Miami after two years)
- Gloria Hatrick Stewart, actress and wife of Jimmy Stewart
- Janet L. Wolff, advertising executive

== See also ==
- List of current and historical women's universities and colleges
- List of defunct colleges and universities in New York
