= Dubois, Wyoming =

- Town
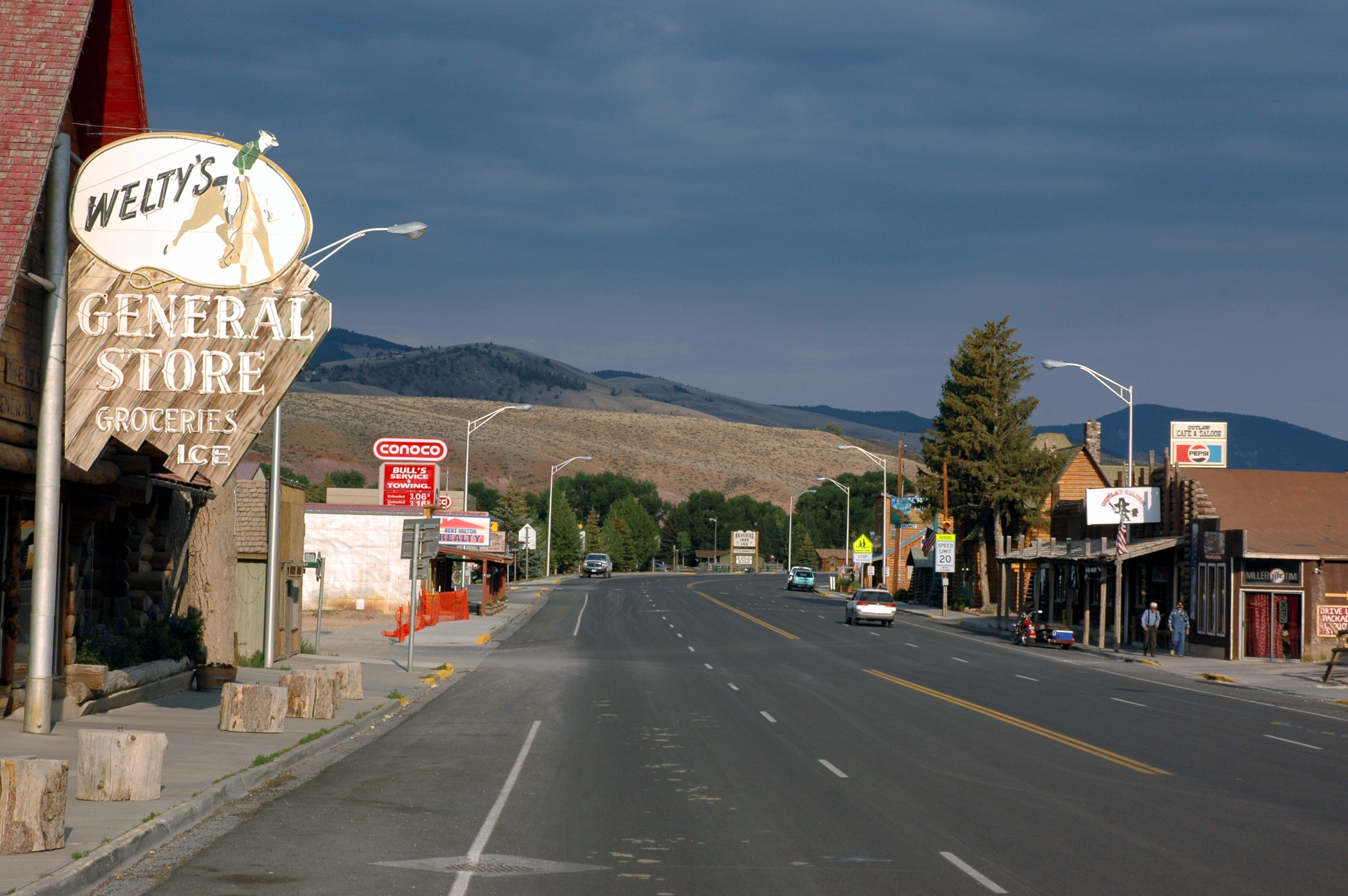
- Along the main street in Dubois
- Motto: "Where Real Cowboys Work and Play"
- Location of Dubois in Fremont County, Wyoming
- Coordinates: 43°32′08″N 109°38′09″W
- Country: United States
- State: Wyoming
- County: Fremont

Area
  - Total: 3.49 sq mi (9.04 km^{2})
  - Land: 3.48 sq mi (9.01 km^{2})
  - Water: 0.012 sq mi (0.03 km^{2})
- Elevation: 6,946 ft (2,117 m)

Population (2020)
  - Total: 911
  - Density: 261.0/sq mi (100.77/km^{2})
- Time zone: UTC-7 (Mountain (MST))
  - Summer (DST): UTC-6 (MDT)
- ZIP code: 82513
- Area code: 307
- FIPS code: 56-21415
- GNIS feature ID: 2412450
- Website: Town of Dubois, Wyoming

Dubois (/ˈduːbɔɪz/, DOO-boyz) is a town in Fremont County, Wyoming, United States. The population was 971 at the 2010 census, but dropped to 911 in the 2020 census.

While the Town of Dubois includes 3.49 square miles (9.0 km^{2}) within the Town Limits which constitutes a population density of 261 people per square mile, the 82513 ZIP Code ("Dubois, Wyoming") includes 1,537.47 square miles (3,982.0 km^{2}) and has a total population of 1,549 which is a population density of about 1 person per square mile. For comparison, the Dubois ZIP Code is 324 square miles (840 km^{2}) larger than the entire state of Rhode Island.

== History ==
The original residents of Dubois wanted to name the town Tibo, after the Shoshone language word for "stranger" or "white man," which was the Natives' affectionate name for their Episcopal priest, Father John Roberts. However, the postal service found this name unacceptable, so Governor Joseph M. Carey chose Dubois after his friend Fred Dubois, an Idaho senator at the time. In protest, the citizens of Dubois rejected the French pronunciation of "deh-bwah", instead opting for Du, with u as in "Sue"; bois, with oi as in "voice". This local legend is most likely not true as the town in Idaho, named after the same Idaho Senator, is pronounced the same way as the town in Wyoming. The accent is on the first syllable.

Petroglyphs created by the Sheepeater Native Americans who first settled in the Dubois area

The first occupants of the mountains and valleys surrounding what is now Dubois were members of the Sheepeaters, a group of Mountain Shoshone. They included the Wind River area in their regular annual migrations from the Great Plains through the mountains of Yellowstone and beyond. The Wind River Valley surrounding Dubois contains numerous remnants of these people who lived in the area for many hundreds of years before they were relocated into a nearby reservation. Relics of their existence in the mountains and valleys around Dubois include numerous prehistoric petroglyphs, hunting traps and blinds, and stone tepee circles.

The first Europeans to enter the area were trappers Francois and Louis Verendrye in 1742–43. In the years to follow, the Wind River valley was visited regularly by the Astorians and other fur trappers and hunters through the early 19th century. The first homesteaders arrived in the late 1870s.

Butch Cassidy (Robert LeRoy Parker) owned and managed a ranch on the outskirts of Dubois, beginning in 1890. It is said that he was a frequent customer at Welty's General Store in Dubois, which is still in operation. A statue erected in the center of Dubois is modeled after Butch Cassidy.

Charles Moore built the first of many dude ranches in the area, Ramshorn Ranch and Camp Yellowstone, at the mouth of the DuNoir Creek west of Dubois in 1907.

St. Thomas Episcopal Church was founded in 1910 by Reverend John Roberts, an Episcopal missionary who served the Native American tribes on the Wind River.

In 1913, the town expanded with the addition of a hotel, a bar, and a general store, anticipating the arrival of Scandinavian lumber workers brought there by the Wyoming Tie and Timber Company the following year. All of these structures are still standing. Dubois was incorporated in 1914.

In the landscape surrounding Dubois are visible the remains of wood flumes constructed by the tie hacks who provided the railroad ties that helped to develop the American West. These Scandinavian immigrants cut logs into ties and sent these via the flumes to the Wind River where they floated to Riverton, about 70 miles east, for processing.

On December 30, 2014, several businesses burned to the ground in the downtown area. The air temperatures at the time of the blaze were hovering near -35 °F with wind chills in the range of 50 below zero (-50 °F). Firefighters battled freezing equipment and gear throughout the night to get the fire under control. The blaze was ruled accidental. The origin of the fire appeared to be inside the rear of the "Main Street Mart" building in the attic above a wood stove. The fire was most likely caused by charring (pyrolysis) that resulted from the chimney coming into contact with building materials. Approximately half a block of Downtown Dubois was destroyed by the fire. In July 2016, a wildfire on the outskirts of Dubois again prompted evacuations.

In August 2020, the National Museum of Military Vehicles opened southeast of Dubois. The privately funded $100M museum was founded by Dan Starks, a former lawyer and CEO of St. Jude Medical. It contains 500 fully restored military vehicles, artillery pieces, naval vessels and aircraft dating from 1897 to the present, depicting the American experience in World War II, the Korean War, and the Vietnam War with a focus on the people who used the equipment as much as on the equipment itself.

== Geography ==
The town is on U.S. Route 26 and is the beginning of the Wyoming Centennial Scenic Byway, U.S. Route 26 crossing the Continental Divide at Togwotee Pass. The Wind River runs through the town.

According to the United States Census Bureau, the town has a total area of 3.43 square miles (8.88 km^{2}), of which 3.42 square miles (8.86 km^{2}) is land and 0.01 square miles (0.03 km^{2}) is water.

=== Climate ===
According to the Köppen Climate Classification system, Dubois has a warm-summer humid continental climate, abbreviated "Dfb" on climate maps. The hottest temperature recorded in Dubois was 100 °F (38 °C) on July 28, 1978, while the coldest temperature recorded was −49 °F (−45 °C) on December 5, 1972.

Climate data for Dubois, Wyoming, 1991–2020 normals, extremes 1907–present
Month	Jan	Feb	Mar	Apr	May	Jun	Jul	Aug	Sep	Oct	Nov	Dec	Year
Record high °F (°C)	63 (17)	68 (20)	71 (22)	83 (28)	90 (32)	95 (35)	100 (38)	95 (35)	93 (34)	85 (29)	74 (23)	66 (19)	100 (38)
Mean maximum °F (°C)	51.3 (10.7)	51.8 (11.0)	59.9 (15.5)	69.5 (20.8)	76.3 (24.6)	83.7 (28.7)	88.1 (31.2)	86.8 (30.4)	81.9 (27.7)	73.6 (23.1)	61.4 (16.3)	50.0 (10.0)	87.3 (30.7)
Mean daily maximum °F (°C)	35.9 (2.2)	36.9 (2.7)	44.5 (6.9)	50.5 (10.3)	60.0 (15.6)	70.2 (21.2)	79.4 (26.3)	78.1 (25.6)	68.8 (20.4)	55.7 (13.2)	42.3 (5.7)	34.2 (1.2)	54.7 (12.6)
Daily mean °F (°C)	24.3 (−4.3)	24.7 (−4.1)	31.5 (−0.3)	37.3 (2.9)	46.0 (7.8)	54.5 (12.5)	61.4 (16.3)	60.0 (15.6)	51.8 (11.0)	41.0 (5.0)	30.5 (−0.8)	23.5 (−4.7)	40.5 (4.7)
Mean daily minimum °F (°C)	12.6 (−10.8)	12.5 (−10.8)	18.5 (−7.5)	24.0 (−4.4)	32.0 (0.0)	38.8 (3.8)	43.5 (6.4)	41.9 (5.5)	34.8 (1.6)	26.2 (−3.2)	18.6 (−7.4)	12.7 (−10.7)	26.3 (−3.1)
Mean minimum °F (°C)	−10.2 (−23.4)	−11.3 (−24.1)	−1.1 (−18.4)	10.3 (−12.1)	20.3 (−6.5)	29.5 (−1.4)	35.7 (2.1)	33.0 (0.6)	23.8 (−4.6)	10.8 (−11.8)	−4.6 (−20.3)	−11.6 (−24.2)	−20.6 (−29.2)
Record low °F (°C)	−48 (−44)	−42 (−41)	−38 (−39)	−13 (−25)	3 (−16)	18 (−8)	22 (−6)	20 (−7)	5 (−15)	−17 (−27)	−26 (−32)	−49 (−45)	−49 (−45)
Average precipitation inches (mm)	0.25 (6.4)	0.47 (12)	0.54 (14)	1.28 (33)	1.97 (50)	1.39 (35)	0.97 (25)	0.89 (23)	1.30 (33)	0.88 (22)	0.58 (15)	0.34 (8.6)	10.86 (277)
Average snowfall inches (cm)	4.8 (12)	8.1 (21)	8.2 (21)	9.9 (25)	4.0 (10)	0.6 (1.5)	0.0 (0.0)	0.0 (0.0)	0.8 (2.0)	4.8 (12)	7.6 (19)	6.5 (17)	55.3 (140.5)
Average precipitation days (≥ 0.01 in)	4.7	6.5	7.3	8.8	11.0	8.9	7.3	7.5	6.9	6.9	6.8	5.6	88.2
Average snowy days (≥ 0.1 in)	3.9	5.5	5.1	4.4	1.9	0.3	0.0	0.0	0.5	2.5	4.8	5.0	33.9
Source 1: NOAA
Source 2: National Weather Service

== Demographics ==
Historical population
Census	Pop.	Note	%±
1920	243		—
1930	177		−27.2%
1940	412		132.8%
1950	279		−32.3%
1960	574		105.7%
1970	898		56.4%
1980	1,067		18.8%
1990	895		−16.1%
2000	962		7.5%
2010	971		0.9%
2020	911		−6.2%
U.S. Decennial Census

=== 2010 census ===
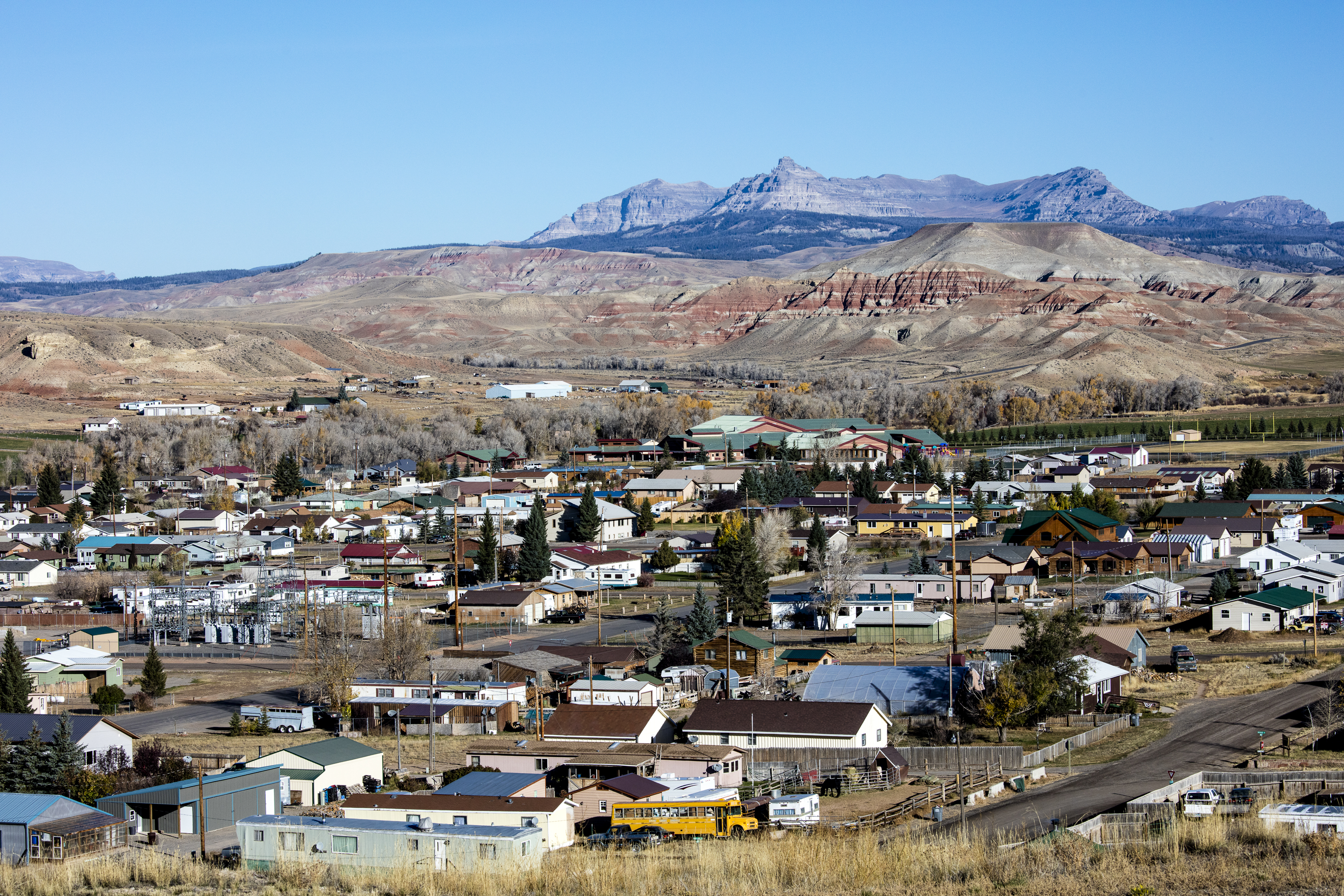
Dubois with Ramshorn Peak to the north

As of the census of 2010, there were 971 people, 507 households, and 256 families residing in the town. The population density was 283.9 inhabitants per square mile (109.6/km^{2}). There were 625 housing units at an average density of 182.7 per square mile (70.5/km^{2}). The racial makeup of the town was 95.8% White, 0.4% African American, 0.9% Native American, 1.2% Asian, 0.2% from other races, and 1.4% from two or more races. Hispanic or Latino of any race were 0.4% of the population.

There were 507 households, of which 14.4% had children under the age of 18 living with them, 41.4% were married couples living together, 5.9% had a female householder with no husband present, 3.2% had a male householder with no wife present, and 49.5% were non-families. 40.6% of all households were made up of individuals, and 17.2% had someone living alone who was 65 years of age or older. The average household size was 1.92 and the average family size was 2.55.

The median age in the town was 51.6 years. 13.8% of residents were under the age of 18; 5.4% were between the ages of 18 and 24; 18.9% were from 25 to 44; 36.7% were from 45 to 64; and 25.1% were 65 years of age or older. The gender makeup of the town was 49.9% male and 50.1% female.

=== 2000 census ===
As of the census of 2000, there were 962 people, 451 households, and 274 families residing in the town. The population density was 370.3 people per square mile (142.9/km^{2}). There were 556 housing units at an average density of 214.0 per square mile (82.6/km^{2}). The racial makeup of the town was 96.15% White, 0.10% African American, 1.25% Native American, 0.31% Asian, 0.31% from other races, and 1.87% from two or more races. Hispanic or Latino of any race were 1.14% of the population.

There were 451 households, out of which 22.6% had children under the age of 18 living with them, 49.4% were married couples living together, 8.4% had a female householder with no husband present, and 39.2% were non-families. 32.6% of all households were made up of individuals, and 8.9% had someone living alone who was 65 years of age or older. The average household size was 2.13 and the average family size was 2.68.

In the town, the population was spread out, with 20.9% under the age of 18, 5.1% from 18 to 24, 25.9% from 25 to 44, 29.6% from 45 to 64, and 18.5% who were 65 years of age or older. The median age was 44 years. For every 100 females, there were 99.2 males. For every 100 females age 18 and over, there were 100.8 males.

The median income for a household in the town was $28,194, and the median income for a family was $33,409. Males had a median income of $28,125 versus $16,719 for females. The per capita income for the town was $15,657. About 9.9% of families and 12.0% of the population were below the poverty line, including 13.8% of those under age 18 and 3.7% of those age 65 or over.

== Government ==
Dubois has a mayor and town council. There are four council members.

In 2022 Patricia Neveaux became mayor. She replaced John Meyer who did not seek re-election. Meyer became mayor in 2019 when Twila Blakeman, who had served two terms, did not seek re-election.

== Arts and culture ==
The Dubois Museum preserves and interprets the natural and social history of the Upper Wind River Valley as the National Bighorn Sheep Interpretive Center focuses on public education about the biology and habitat of the Rocky Mountain Bighorn Sheep with focus on the largest herd of Rocky Mountain Bighorn sheep in the coterminous United States that winter in the Whiskey Basin of Whiskey Mountain adjacent to the Fitzpatrick Wilderness in the Shoshone National Forest. The Center preserves and interprets the relationships of the Bighorn sheep.

Annual cultural events include a national art show and a quilt show, a horseback chariot race, and celebrations during July 4 weekend. During summer months, a square dance and a rodeo including local and regional competitors take place every week.

Dubois has a public library, a branch of the Fremont County Library System.

== Education ==
Public education in the town of Dubois is provided by Fremont County School District #2. The district has one campus which serves Kindergarten - Grade 12. In 2014, Dubois Public Schools built onto the existing Elementary/Middle School to create a K-12 school. As of the 2014-2015 school year, the district enrollment for Dubois Schools was 146.

== Highways ==
- - U.S. Route 26 and U.S. Route 287 run concurrently through Dubois, on West Ramshorn.

== Notable people ==
- Butch Cassidy (1866–1908), the train and bank robber, owned a ranch on the outskirts of Dubois
- Gardello Dano Christensen (1907–1991), writer of westerns and children's books
- Trudy Dittmar (born 1944), nature writer, essayist
- Kate M. Fox (born 1955), chief justice of the Wyoming Supreme Court
- Matthew Fox (born 1966), actor most known for his work in the ABC drama series Lost
- Woodie Held (1932–2009), baseball player; originally from Sacramento, California
- Michael Hossack (1946–2012), drummer for The Doobie Brothers
- Connie Kemmerer, businesswoman, philanthropist; co-owns a dude ranch near Dubois
- Jay Kemmerer (born 1947), businessman, philanthropist owns a dude ranch near Dubois
- Gale W. McGee (1915–1992), former United States Senator
- Chance Phelps (1984–2004), US Marine killed in Iraq, subject of the film Taking Chance
- Gerry Spence (1929-2025), trial lawyer established the Trial Lawyers College near Dubois

== See also ==
- Dunoir, Wyoming
- Camp Dubois, Wyoming
