= Carol Stronghilos =

American artist (1925–2010)

Carol Stronghilos (June 18, 1925 – October 3, 2010) was an American artist. In 1979, Stronghilos co-founded the New York Feminist Art Institute.

She has exhibited her paintings at the Whitney Museum, the Aldrich Museum, the Newark Museum and the Brooklyn Museum.

== Solo exhibitions ==
1972, Carol Stronghilos, Brooklyn Museum.
