= Whiskey Mountain =

Mountain in Wyoming, United States

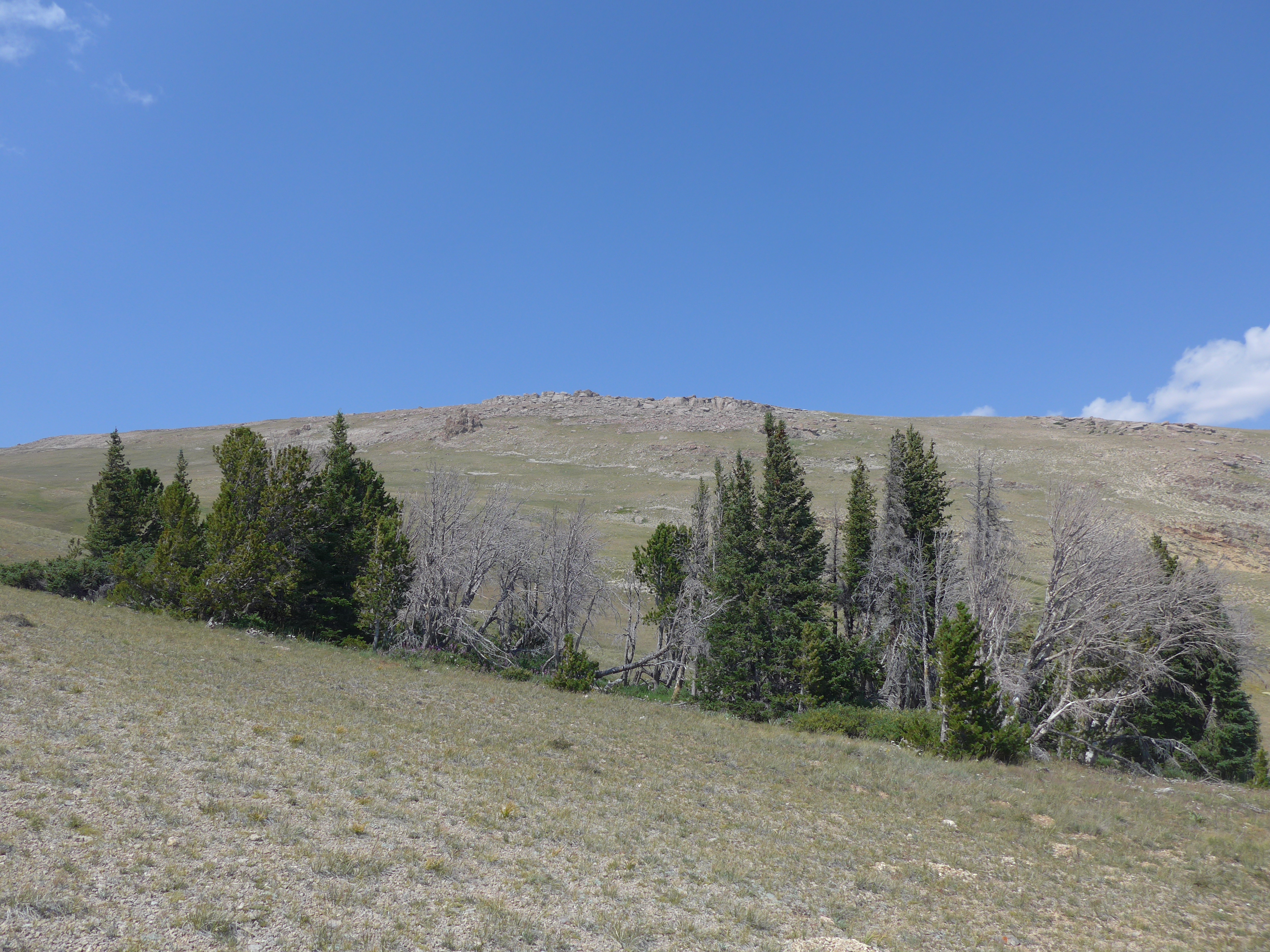
- Whiskey Mountain from south

Highest point
- Elevation: 11,157 ft (3,401 m)
- Prominence: 677 ft (206 m)
- Coordinates: 43°25′49″N 109°37′22″W

Geography
- Location within Wyoming Location within the United States
- Location: Fremont County, Wyoming, U.S.
- Parent range: Wind River Range
- Topo map: USGS Torrey Lake

Climbing
- Easiest route: Hike

Whiskey Mountain (11,157 ft (3,401 m)) is located in the northern Wind River Range in the U.S. state of Wyoming. Located 5 mi (8.0 km) south of Dubois, Wyoming, Whiskey Mountain is within the Whiskey Mountain Wilderness Study Area, which has the largest wintering concentration of Rocky Mountain Bighorn sheep in the coterminous United States.

== Hazards ==
Encountering bears is a concern in the Wind River Range. There are other concerns as well, including bugs, wildfires, adverse snow conditions and nighttime cold temperatures.

Importantly, there have been notable incidents, including accidental deaths, due to falls from steep cliffs (a misstep could be fatal in this class 4/5 terrain) and due to falling rocks, over the years, including 1993, 2007 (involving an experienced NOLS leader), 2015 and 2018. Other incidents include a seriously injured backpacker being airlifted near SquareTop Mountain in 2005, and a fatal hiker incident (from an apparent accidental fall) in 2006 that involved state search and rescue. The U.S. Forest Service does not offer updated aggregated records on the official number of fatalities in the Wind River Range.
