= Camp Dubois, Wyoming =

Historical place in Fremont County, Wyomingy, United States

Camp Dubois
- Location within Wyoming Location within the United States
- 43°28′53″N 109°52′36″W
- Location: Union Pass, Dubois, Wyoming

History
- Built for: Wyoming Tie and Timber Company (1914-1947); United States Army (1944-1946)

Site notes
- Governing body: United States Forest Service

Tie Hack Historical Monument
- Tie Hack Historical Monument

- Location within Wyoming Location within the United States
- 43.646500°N 109.925750°W
- Location: U.S. Route 26, Dubois, Wyoming

History
- Built: 1946
- Built for: Wyoming Tie and Timber Company

Site notes
- Architect: Boris Gilbertson
- Architectural style: 14-foot limestone monument
- Governing body: United States Forest Service

Camp Dubois is a historical site at Union Pass in the Wind River Range in Fremont County of western Wyoming in the United States. Camp Dubois was 9 miles (14 km) west of the community of Dubois, Wyoming. Camp Dubois is at about 9,212 feet (2,808 m) elevation on the Continental Divide in the Shoshone National Forest, near the Little Warm Spring Creek. Camp Dubois opened in July 1944 and operated as World War 2 Prisoner of war (POW) camp. The camp was also called a Tie Camp. The camp closed in January 1946. Today there are a few remains of the camp. Before the POW camp, the site was a timber camp of the Wyoming Tie & Timber Company starting in 1914. The Wyoming Tie & Timber Company build the Tie Hack Historical Monument in 1946.

== Wyoming Tie & Timber Company timber camp ==
Camp Dubois Tie driver, taking log to the Wyoming Tie and Timber Company, to be made into railroad ties for the growing railroad industry. Dubois timber camps supplied the Chicago and Northwestern Railroad

Tie Camps opened near Camp Dubois in 1913. Trees were cut and turned into railroad ties for the growing railroad industry. Dubois timber camps supplied the Chicago and North Western Railway. Those that cut railroad ties were nickname, Tie Hack. Before World War 2 most of the workers immigrant from Ireland, Sweden and Norway. Most Dubois timber camps were operated by the Wyoming Tie and Timber Company. At the largest Dubois timber camp is a 14-foot limestone monument overlooks former Tie Camp built in 1946 on U.S. Route 26 (Wyoming Centennial Scenic Byway) at 43.646500°N 109.925750°W. The Tie Hack Historical Monument was built by the Wyoming Tie & Timber Company. Tie Hack Historical Monument was carved by Boris Gilbertson. The Tie Hack Historical Monument has a tie hack clutching a broad-head ax and a cross cut saw and other workers cutting and moving ties. A Tie Hack Memorial Marker is also at the site. The Tie Hack Historical Monument is 12 miles (19 km) northwest of Dubois, Wyoming. In 1914 the first logging site for the Wyoming Tie & Timber Company was in Togwotee Pass. In 1868 the first Tie Hacking start in Medicine Bow Mountains to supply the Union Pacific Railroad.

On the base of the Memorial:

Erected to perpetuate the memory
of the hardy woods and river men
who made and delivered the cross
ties for the building and maintenance
of the Chicago and North Western
Railway in the western country
Wyoming Tie & Timber Company

== Prisoner of war camp ==
During World War II, starting in July 1944 German POWs were housed at Camp Dubois; for timber operations. Prisoner of war labor worked for civilian employers under the military officials and the Department of Agriculture's Extension Service. At Camp Dubois the Camp prisoners worked for the Wyoming Tie and Timber Company. Wyoming Tie and Timber had request POW workers, due to the war labor shortage. Wyoming Tie and Timber Company cut and made railroad ties at the Wyoming Tie and Timber sawmill. The camp worked six days a week, with Sunday off. The POW Labor Program benefited the US during wartime as there was a shortage of labor. About 150 POWs lived at the camp, with about 10 Army guards. Most POWs came from Camp Scottsbluff in Scottsbluff, Nebraska. The local logging companies paid the prisoner labor, now lumberjacks, the same as local civilians. The cut logs taken to the banks of the Wind River. In the spring, with a high river, the logs were bulldozed into the river. The logs were then floated down to Camp Riverton in Riverton. The pay was given in camp scrip. The scrip could be used at the camp store for candy, soda pop, stamps to write home and other items. The war ended, the camp closed in January 1946. During World War II, two large POW base camps, (Camp Douglas and Fort Francis E. Warren), and seventeen smaller camps that did agricultural and timber work were located in Wyoming. Other smaller camps in Wyoming were: Basin, Wyoming (sugar beet harvest), Clearmont (sugar beet harvest), Deaver (sugar beet harvest), Camp Esterbrook (timber camp), Huntley (sugar beet harvest), Lingle (agriculture), Lovell (remodeling the Lovell Armory and Cavalry Barn, and then sugar beet harvest), Pine Bluffs (sugar beet and potato harvest), Powell (sugar beet harvest), Riverton (sugar beet harvest), Torrington (agriculture), Veteran (agriculture), Wheatland (agriculture), Ryan Park Camp (timber), Centennial POW Camp (timber) and Worland (agriculture).

== Exhibit ==
At the Wind River Historical Center is Camp Dubois: German Prisoner of War Camp Exhibit. The exhibit opened May 23, 2019. The grand opening was for the 75th anniversary in June 2019, the 75th anniversary of the POWs arrival. The Dubois Museum, Wind River Historical Center, at 43.537278°N 109.646222°W, has exhibits with original POW artifacts and camp life photos.

== Gallery ==
Dubois Wyoming Tie & Timber Company tie hacks at river in 1924

Wyoming Tie & Timber Company Tie hacks on river near Camp Dubois in 1924.

Wyoming Tie & Timber Company Tie drive in 1924 in the Washakie National Forest

== See also ==
- Camp Douglas (Wyoming)
- Dunoir, Wyoming
- Dubois Museum
- National Museum of Military Vehicles
- National Bighorn Sheep Interpretive Center
