= Dubois Museum =

History museum in Dubois, Wyoming

Coordinates: 43.537381°N 109.646124°W

- Location: 909 West Ramshorn St. Dubois, Wyoming, United States
- Type: Interpretive Center
- Website: Official website

The Dubois Museum is a 3,850-square-foot (358 m^{2}) museum preserving and interpreting the history of the Upper Wind River Valley and is located in the town of Dubois, Wyoming on U.S. Route 26 along the Wyoming Centennial Scenic Byway. The museum offers interpretive programs, exhibits, multi-media presentations, and special events.

== Exhibits ==
The center contains several permanent exhibits.

- The Natural History of the Upper Wind River Valley featuring displays including the geology of the Wind River including the Chugwater Formation, gastroliths, Turritella agates, and the flora and fauna including the native cutthroat trout and bighorn sheep
- The Mountain Shoshone, known as the Sheepeaters, and how they lived as interpreted from the steatite tools, horn bows crafted from bighorn sheep horn, and petroglyphs left from ancestors
- The Charlie Moore Collection presenting artifacts of the CM Ranch, the oldest continuously operating guest ranch in Wyoming.
- the Scandinavian loggers (tie hacks) who cut railroad ties for the nation's railroads in the national forests near Dubois as presented in the Wind River Tie-Hack Gallery
- The US Cavalry in Wyoming
- The homesteaders who settled in the late 1800s

Educational tours are also offered to area geological, archaeological, and historical sites of Sheepeater bighorn sheep traps, Plains Indians teepee rings, petroglyphs, and cabins from the “tie hack” era.

== See also ==
- CM Ranch and Simpson Lake Cabins
- National Bighorn Sheep Interpretive Center
- List of Registered Historic Places in Wyoming
- Camp Dubois, Wyoming
- Tie Hack Historical Monument
