= Camp Douglas (Wyoming) =

- Officer's Club, Douglas Prisoner of War
- U.S. National Register of Historic Places
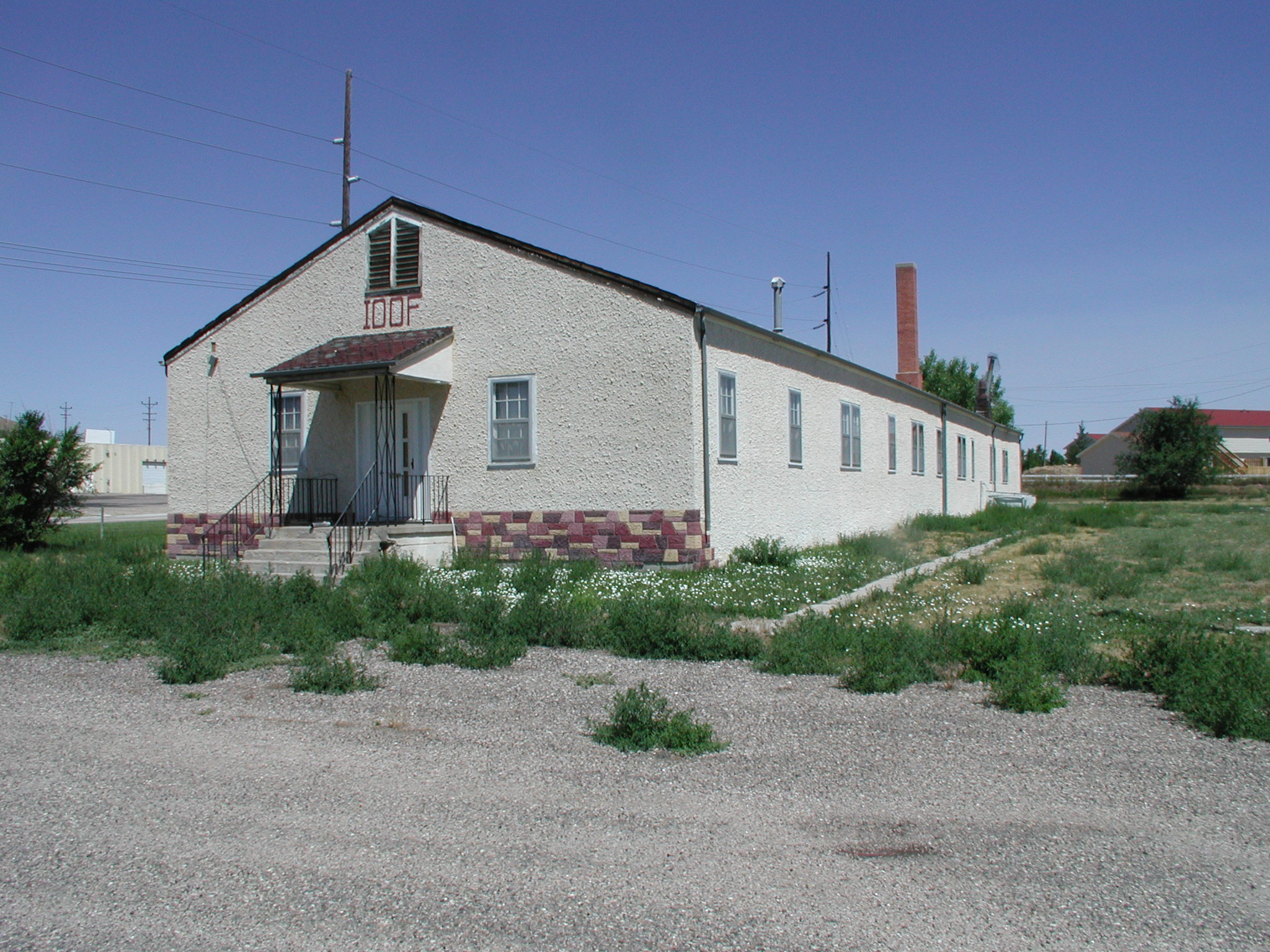
- Officer's Club from 1943

- Location within Wyoming Location within the United States
- Location: 115 S. Riverbend Dr., Douglas, Wyoming
- Coordinates: 42°45′24″N 105°24′20″W
- Area: 1.5 acres (0.61 ha)
- Built: 1943
- NRHP reference No.: 01000965
- Added to NRHP: September 8, 2001

Camp Douglas was an internment camp for Prisoners of War (POW) during World War II, located in the city of Douglas, Wyoming, United States. Between January 1943 and February 1946 in the camp housing first Italian and then German prisoners of war in the United States. While there are few remaining structures, the walls of the Officer's Club were painted with murals by three Italian prisoners. These paintings depicting western life and folklore are now registered with the United States Department of the Interior National Park Service on the National Register of Historic Places. The story of this POW camp is an important part of the history of the town of Douglas.

== Officer's Club ==
The Officer's Club on the site of the former Douglas POW Camp, constructed in 1943, is a one-story rectangular building measuring 37 feet wide and 132 feet long. The utilitarian, wood-framed building rests on a partial concrete pad and concrete footers.

Stucco applied during the 1980s covers the original walls that were sided with asbestos shingles. The gable roof is covered with asphalt shingles. An enclosed porch projects from the west side of the building. A tall brick chimney is located on the far northeast side of the roof.

A kitchen, pantry, and furnace room are located at the north end of the building which is accessed by a single door on the north side. South of the kitchen area on either side of a hallway are located two bathrooms, a hall closet, and a small game room. The majority of the building is devoted to a large club room from which one can access, through two separate doorways, the west side enclosed porch which also has a door leading to the small game room. The south side of the building beyond the club room consists of a large hallway and three separate rooms now used for storage. An exit doorway on the south side is covered with a small shed roof and concrete steps lead up to it.

The building includes numerous single and paired, wood-framed, six- over-six lite windows. The west side porch has banks of windows on its three sides; most have been stuccoed over. Most interior walls are covered with celotex although the walls of the club room and small game room are half-paneled. Floors in the kitchen and pantry area are concrete while others in the more public areas are wood. The kitchen and bathroom floors have been covered with linoleum and both entry halls are now carpeted. Ten wood trusses project through the newer drop ceiling in the club room. All other ceilings are the original celotex. Some globe light fixtures hang from the ceiling in the club room along with newer fluorescent units.

The club room features one of Wyoming's 20th-century treasures, sixteen murals painted by three Italian prisoners-of-war during 1943–1944. The rendered murals painted directly on the celotex walls depict icons of the mythical American west: cowboys, Indians, wagon trains, cattle drives, a stockade fort, and even the famous Old Faithful geyser in Wyoming's Yellowstone National Park. The murals gain special significance for the very reason that they are a vision of the west created by three Italians who had most likely only seen the fabled American West through a train window. The images they created were inspired from American movies and books.

Within the past year, an effort has been made by the local historic preservation board and the City of Douglas to assist the dedicated Odd Fellows in preserving this unique structure. Grant funds were received to hire a conservator for an analysis of the paintings and the development of a conservation plan. The next step is to find funding for the actual conservation of the murals. It is hoped that the building can one day be open to the public so they can view the murals. Few people in Wyoming today, outside of Douglas residents, are even aware the murals exist.

The building exhibits integrity of design, location, feeling, association, and workmanship. The stucco siding over the original has a negative impact on integrity of materials. Integrity of the setting has been compromised by nearby development that has taken place over the past thirty years.

The former Officer's Club at the Douglas Prisoner of War Camp is eligible for listing in the National Register of Historic Places under Criterion A for its association with the direct impact of World War II on hundreds of local communities in the United States.

Although armed conflict never reached the US shores, the effects of the war were nonetheless experienced in many different ways on the home front. The Douglas POW Camp exemplifies indirectly the strength and power the United States brought to the European war effort, especially the technological, mobilization, and organizational skills that were quickly marshaled for the war effort as evidenced by the rapid construction of various types of military facilities built in record time throughout the country.

The building also represents a new approach to construction techniques introduced on a mass scale during this time of rapid defense mobilization: the standardization of plans for pre-fab units, and assembly-line approach to construction of building with a planned temporary shelf life.

== Murals ==
Especially significant are the murals painted on the interior walls of the building by three Italian POWs. The images are of the American West and take on special meaning in that they were painted by men who had most likely not seen the west other than in movies and books. Although murals were painted at other military installations throughout the United States during the World War II period, a survey of other State Historic Preservation Offices revealed that only a few survive due to demolition of buildings never expected to remain standing long enough to qualify as "historic". The survey also indicated that these murals may be the only extant collection painted by Italian POWs as most others were reputed to be the work of German prisoners.

The Officers Club is located on the site of the former Prisoner of War Camp and was one of the 180 buildings constructed during a 95-day period in the spring of 1943 for an estimated cost of $1.1 million. The camp was among the 155 base camps and branch camps that were constructed throughout the United States during the war to house Prisoners of War captured in Europe and the African Theatre.

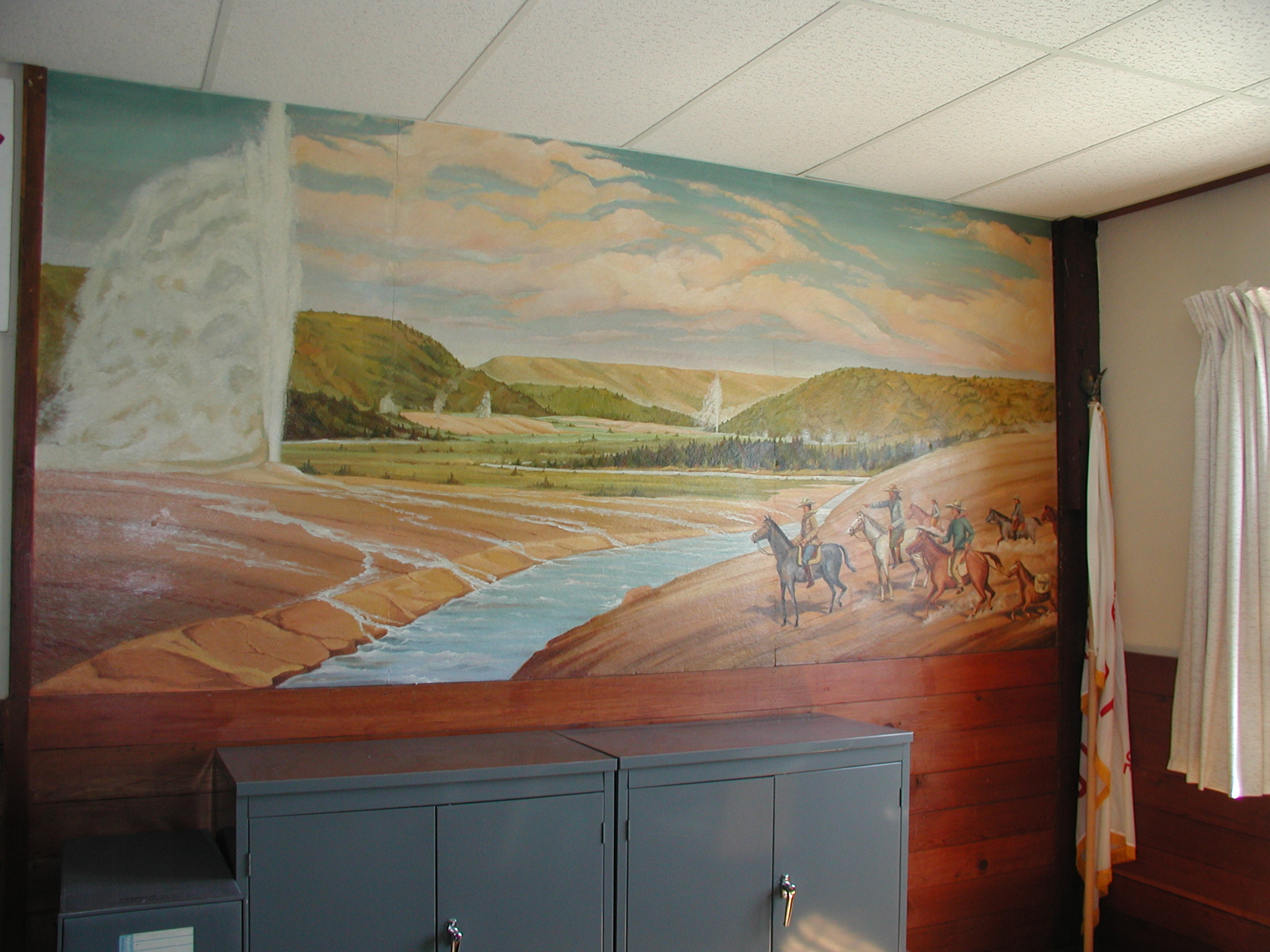
Yellowstone

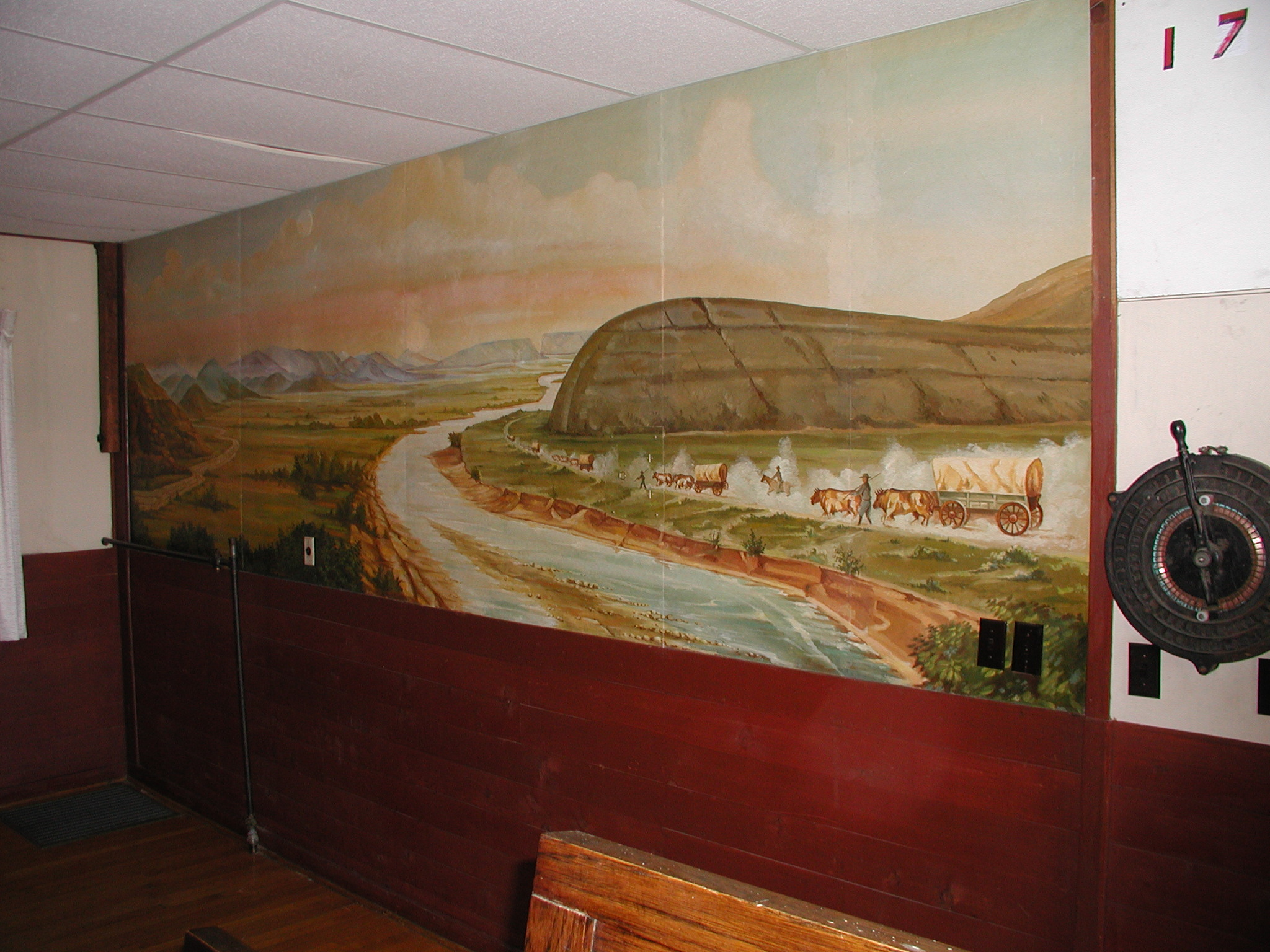
Independence Rock

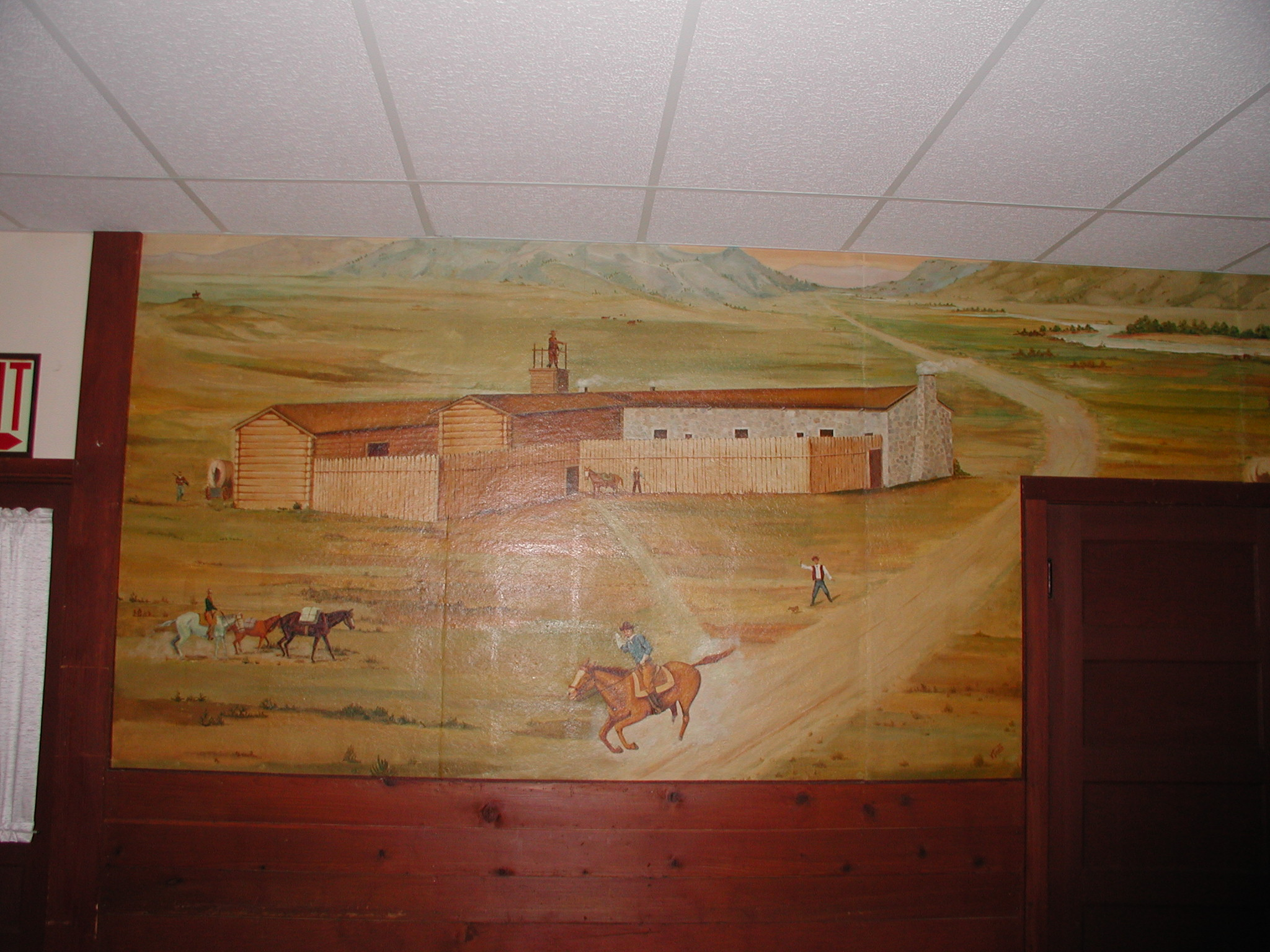
Western Fort

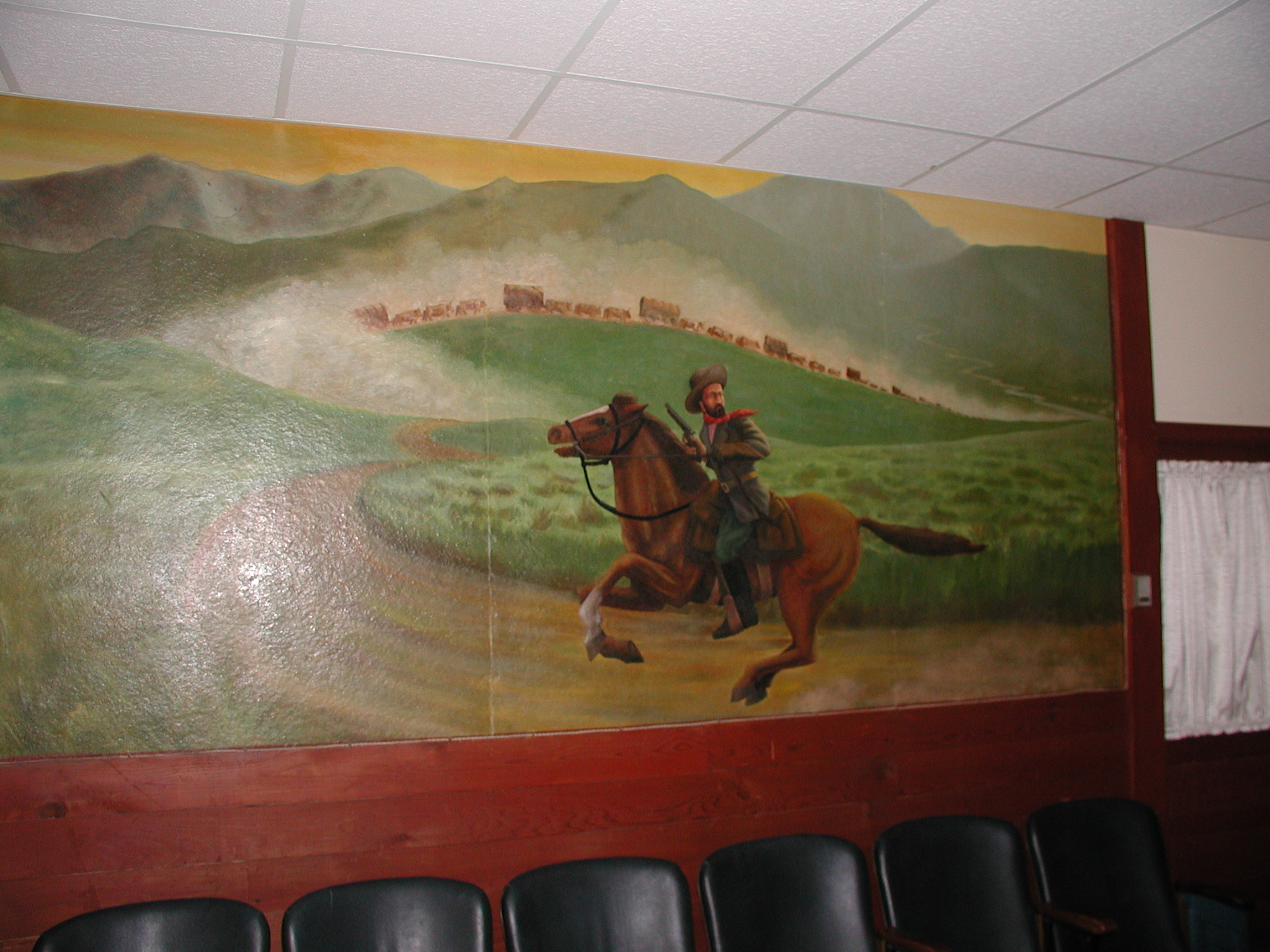
Wagon Train

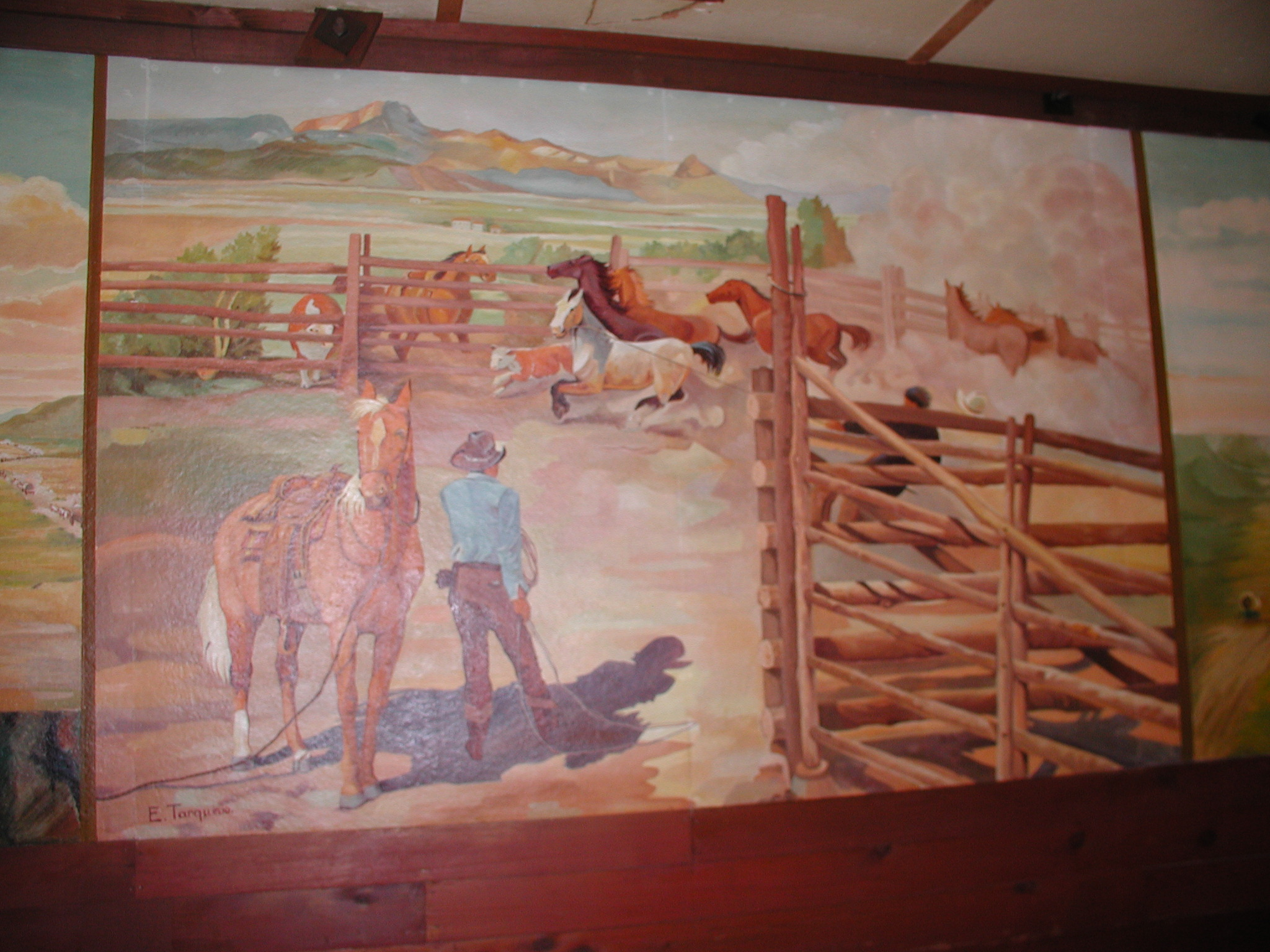
Round Up

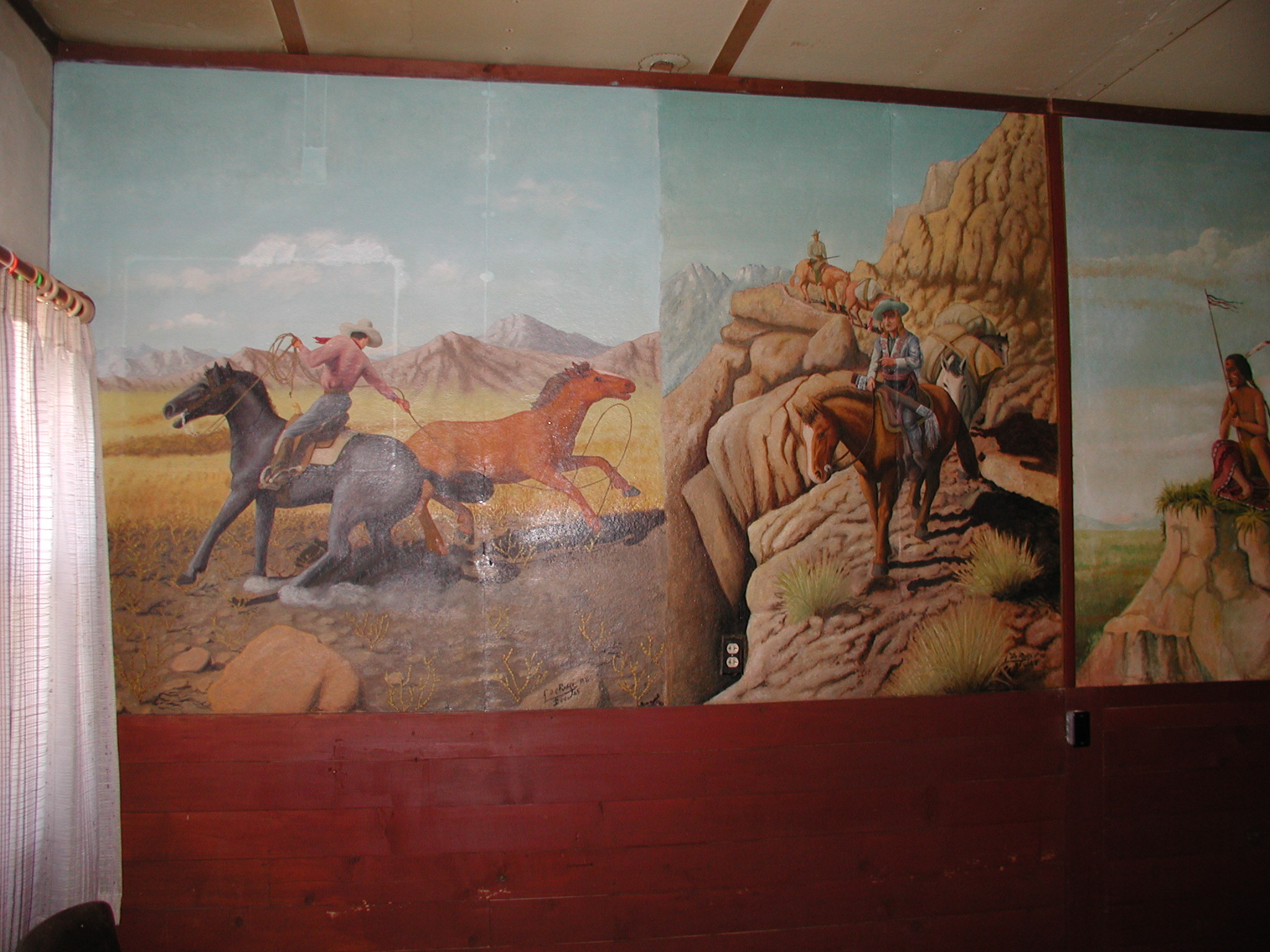
Branding/Rocky Trail

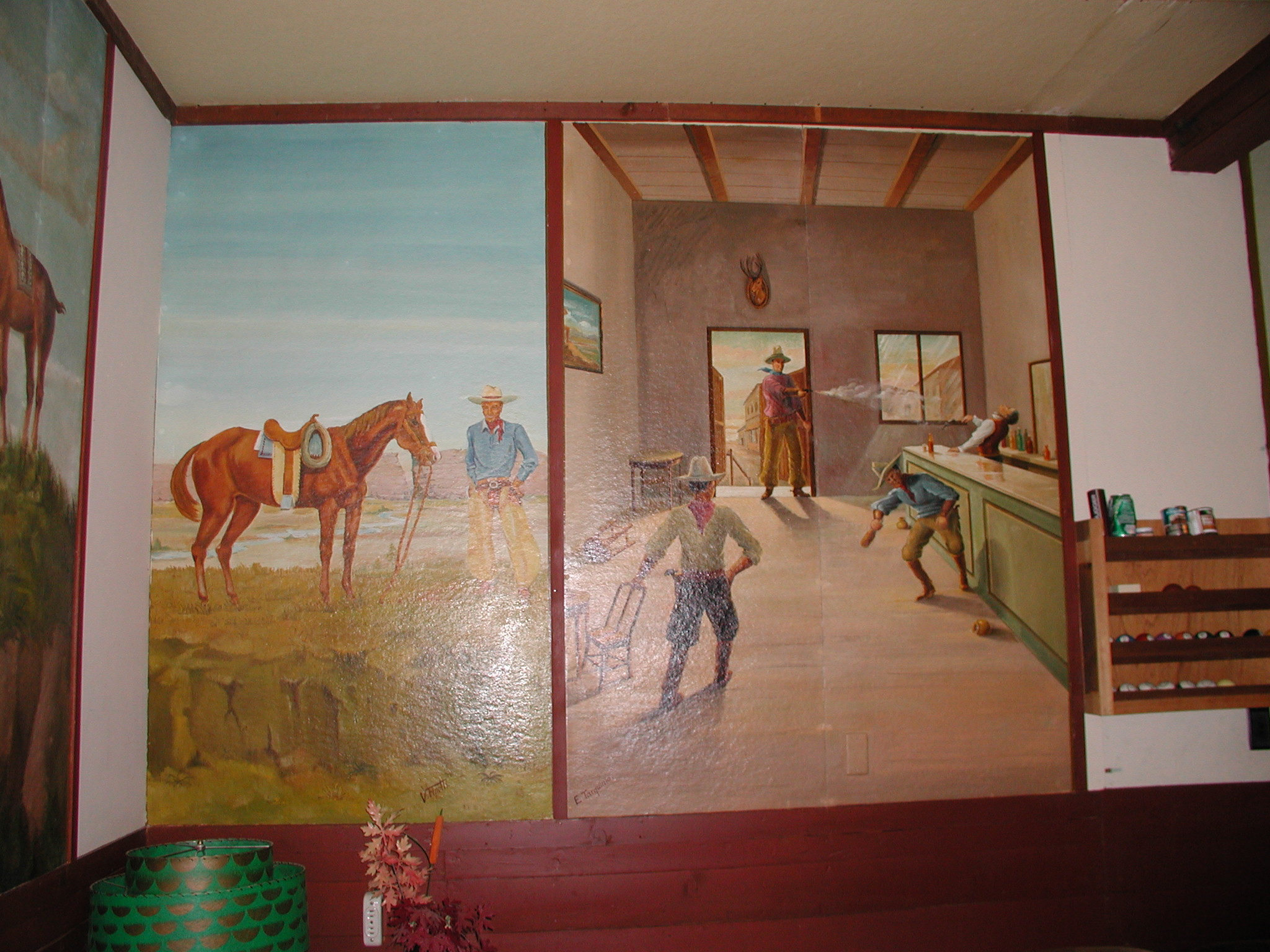
Western Saloon

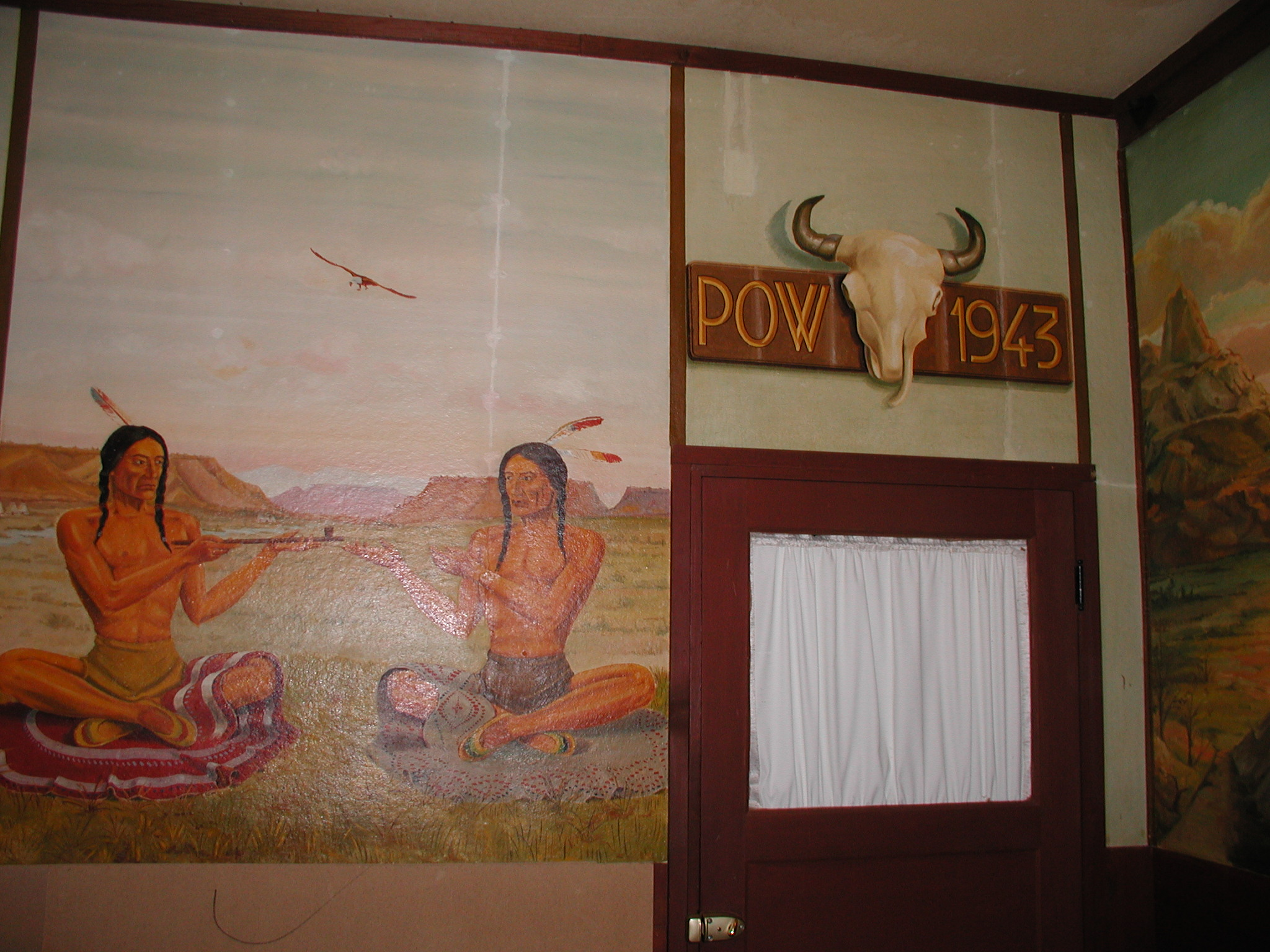
Indian Peace Pipe

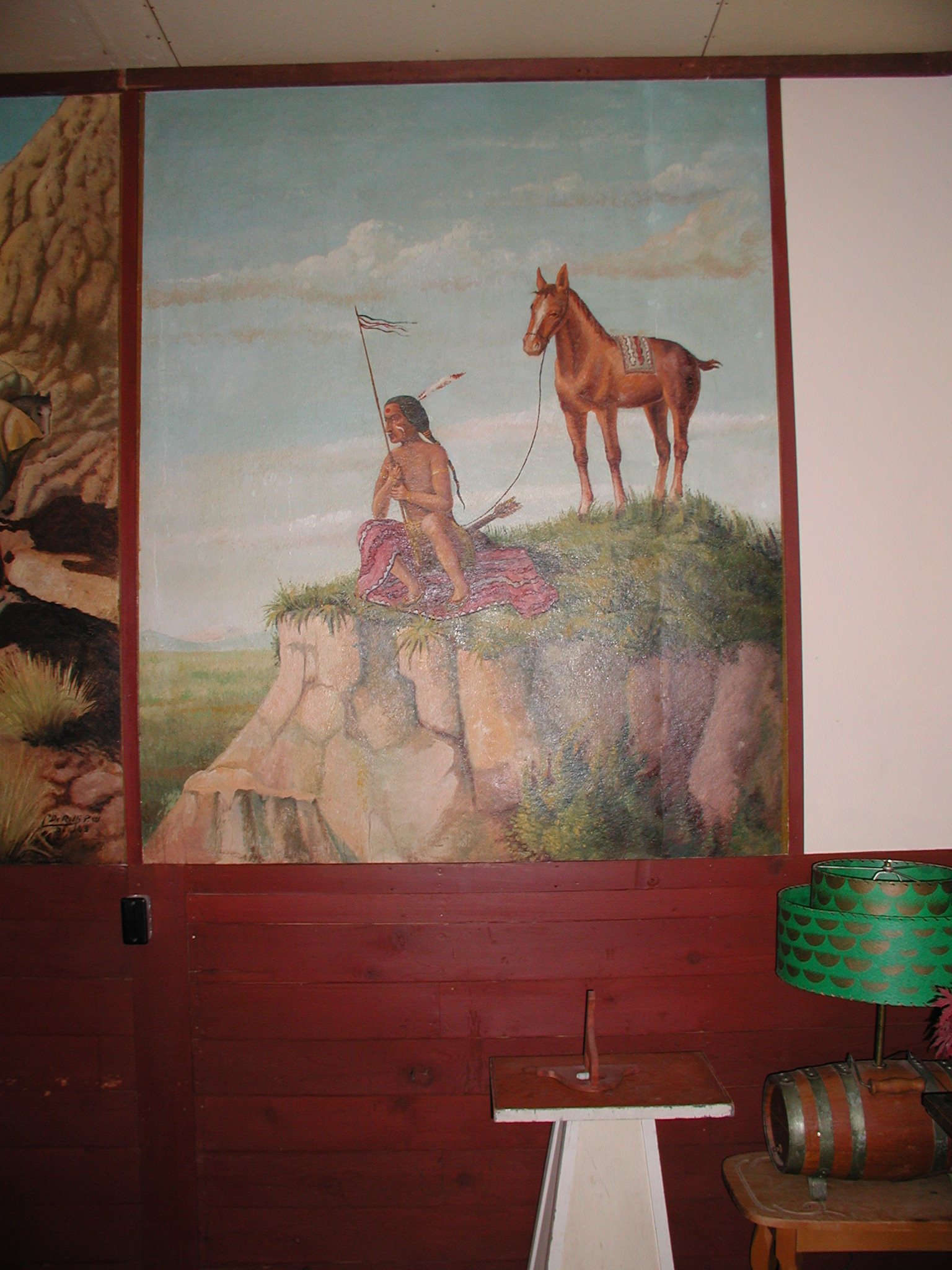
Indian Lookout

== Camp history ==
During 1942, the first year of the war for the United States, an estimated 2000 prisoners came to the United States. Overcrowded POW compounds overseas led U. S. military authorities to come up with an American internment program by September of that year. The immediate measures to accommodate over Italian 50,000 POWS held by the British in North Africa included reactivating Civilian Conservation Corps camps; opening unused portions of several major military bases; utilizing such facilities as fairgrounds, race tracks, armories, and auditoriums; and setting up "tent cities' in remote areas of the country. (Eventually almost half a million German POWs and about 4,000 Japanese POWs would also be brought to the U.S.)

The longer-range $50 million-dollar program of POW camp construction began in the fall of 1942. Security regulations dictated the camps be located in remote and isolated areas. No camps could be built within 170 miles inland from the east and west coasts; nor within a 150-mile-wide zone (240 km) along the Canadian and Mexican borders. Locations near shipyards, munitions plants, and other vital wartime industries were forbidden due to fears of sabotage. The ideal site, according to the Army Corps of Engineers, was an area of 350 acres (140 ha) of level and well-drained land located within five miles of a railroad and 500 feet (150 m) from any public road.

Construction of POW camps in the United States also abided by the international Geneva Convention agreements, signed by 47 world powers in 1929, which defined treatment of enemy prisoners. The U.S.A. made a much greater attempt to live up to the pact than the Axis powers. According to interpretation by American military leaders, camps had to be constructed to the minimum standards of a regular military compound.

The presence of a large POW camp would provide an economic boon to a state and the nearby communities so "Chambers of Commerce, business men, the Commerce and department, city mayors, and the state's political leaders sought to secure the establishment of military installations'" in Wyoming, according to historian T. A. Larson. These lobbying efforts resulted in the construction of a new air base at Casper, a large expansion at Cheyenne's Fort F. E. Warren, and the selection of a site on the outskirts of the small town of Douglas as the location for a POW camp.

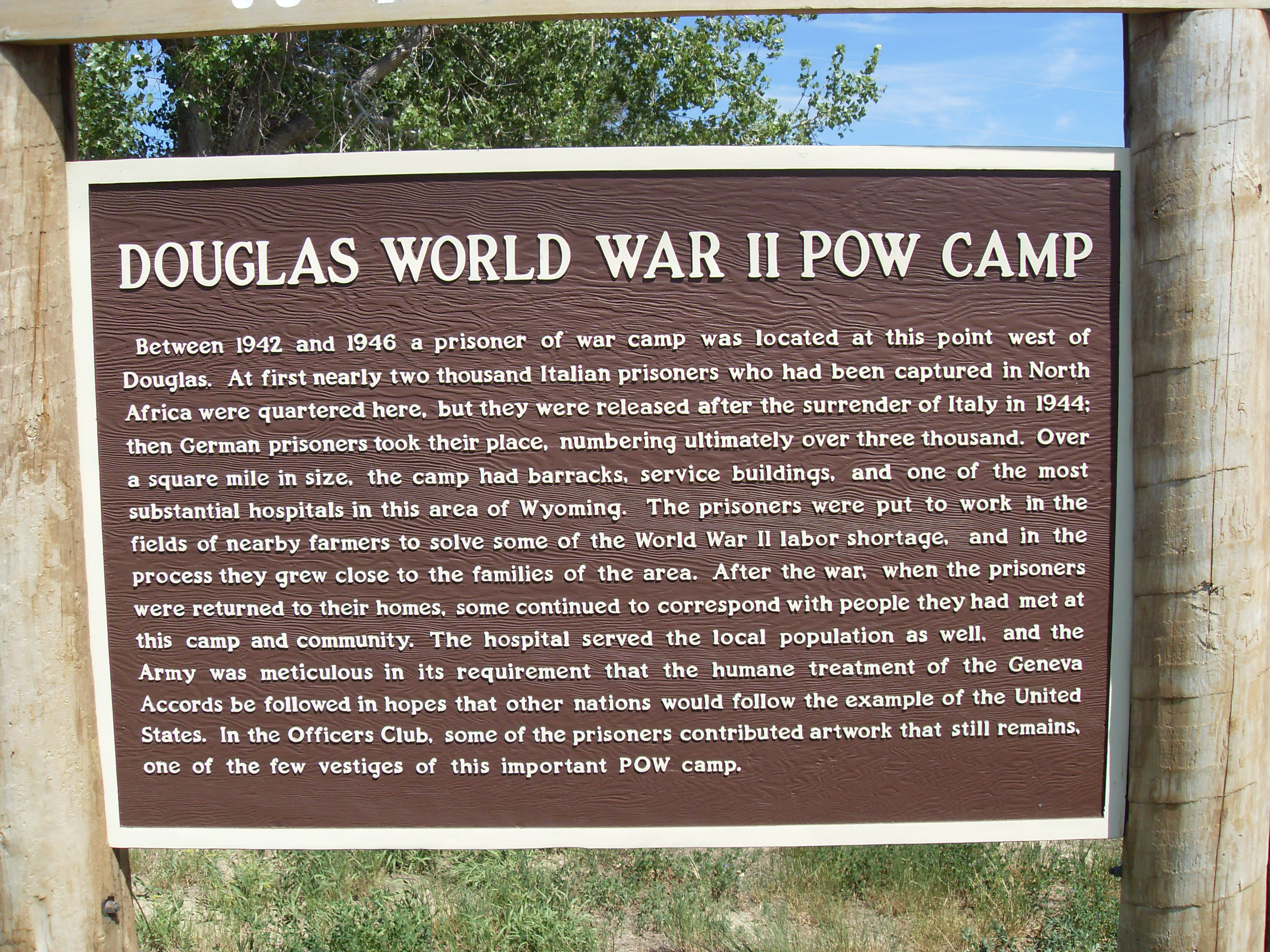
History of the camp on a sign at the entrance

The Douglas site met the defense regulations. Located in Converse County within one mile of a rail line that passed through downtown Douglas, the 687-acre site (278 ha) sat above the banks of the North Platte River. The federal government acquired the land through condemnation; a legal battle ensued in which the defendants were eventually awarded more money for their land than the government had initially proposed. Government surveyors and engineers arrived in Douglas in December, 1942, fueling rumors of the proposed POW camp although the official announcement did not come until January, 1943. Peter Kiewit and Sons of Omaha, Nebraska came in with the low bid and the company set up operations in Douglas by February. Four to five hundred construction workers used the 4-H buildings on the state fairgrounds as dorms and a dining hall. The government contract specified the buildings be completed within 120 days; Kiewit and Sons finished the job in 95 days.

The Officers quarters, clubhouse, and softball field were located at the north main entrance to the camp, outside the double rows of wired fencing (the inner fence was electrified) and guard towers that surrounded the rest of the complex. The hospital area and the troop barracks were built directly inside the fence. Beyond that, the prison complex was organized into three compounds, separated by wire electrified fencing, each with a capacity of approximately one thousand men. Auxiliary areas for prisoners included a large outdoor recreation area near the river, a softball field, and one football field. The camp also accommodated a variety of operational functions in buildings designed for the motor pool, a heating plant, warehouses, corrals, a K-9 dog unit, a sewage disposal plant, as well as a salvage yard and gravel pit.

The Douglas mayor urged local residents to rent any spare rooms in their houses to the incoming military personnel and their families as a housing crunch was inevitable in the town. The town leaders with the home front war effort quickly established a Service Men's Center in the downstairs room of the Moose Lodge. Moose members cleaned and remodeled the room while the ladies of the lodge scrounged up furniture and curtains from local donations. The Moose Lodge basement became a popular hangout for servicemen with daily hours from 5 p.m. till midnight, and stayed open till 2 a.m. on Saturday nights. The Center affiliated with the national USO organization during the final days of the war. The local newspaper focused on the anticipation and excitement of the arrival of the U. S. Army coming to their town, especially the officers, and downplayed any apprehension people may have felt about having an enemy population one mile away that outnumbered the townsfolk.

A role was planned for the prisoners as employees outside of the camp. As elsewhere throughout the United States, the departure of thousands of Wyoming's men to the war left the state with a critical shortage of agricultural labor. POWs provided a solution to the problem and performed many essential jobs related to agriculture, particularly harvesting crops whether it was cotton in the South or sugar beets and timber in Wyoming. In anticipation of the much-needed prison labor, local Converse County ranchers and farmers formed a corporation before the first prisoner arrived and appointed a manager to handle the governmental red tape involved in the contracting procedures.

== Camp opening ==
The first of the eventual five hundred plus Army personnel arrived at the camp in May and more filtered in throughout the summer of 1942. On June 20, before the camp received any POWs, the new facility was opened for the first and only time to the curious civilian population. Over two thousand people from seventeen Wyoming counties visited the site during the two-hour open house and, according to local newspaper reports, were especially impressed by the 150-bed hospital.

== Italian POWs ==
Italians were the first group of POWs that arrived in August, 1943 from, by train, most having arrived from North Africa by ship, to Virginia and other ports. A crowd gathered to watch the four hundred and twelve closely guarded captives from the Tunisian Campaign as they alighted from the train in Douglas and proceeded to march, in units of fifty, the one mile to the outlying camp. As routine for all incoming POWs, the Italian prisoners were checked into the camp through the hospital where they were examined and treated for minor disorders. Their clothes were searched and each man was issued new clothing and assigned to one of the three compounds. By year end, the number of Italian POWs at the camp had reached 1900 men and included one major, four captains, and twenty two lieutenants. The Italian officers had their own barracks and were assigned supervisory duties over their enlisted compatriots. The first prisoner to die from illness at the camp was a captain whose body was buried in a small cemetery plot on the camp grounds and later disinterred and sent back to Italy.

The prisoners enjoyed playing soccer and doing calisthenics outside in spite of the cold winter. One Italian prisoner learned American cooking at the camp and enjoyed cooking both American and Italian food for his fellow prisoners, the camp officers, and patients and staff at the hospital. A Catholic chaplain of Italian descent provided musical instruments to some of the prisoners. They set up a small Catholic church in the camp theater where they also put on musical and theatrical productions with costumes made of flour sacks.

Three Italian prisoners left a remarkable artistic legacy with the sixteen murals they painted almost sixty years ago that can be seen today on the walls of the Officers Club, one of only a few camp buildings still standing. These men, known for years only by their signatures on the murals- -V. Finotti, E. Tarquinio, and F. DeRossi - painted a variety of western scenes. One of them, Enzo Tarquinio, has been further traced, including his family connection to Sergio Tarquinio, a leading Italian cartoonist, who was Enzo's younger brother. The large murals, most are six feet high and some as long as fifteen feet, depict cowboys, bar shootouts, a Native American smoking a peace pipe, a wagon train, a frontier stockade fort, and most surprisingly, Yellowstone National Park's Old Faithful geyser erupting in front of a cowboy audience. Ironically, although they were right in the middle of cowboy country, they of course as prisoners would have had very little opportunity to explore it. No doubt, some of the western images came from American movies while others the artists may have seen in books. Other pieces of art were also left behind by the Italians, including works by Giannino Gherardi and Walter Discosti.

== German POWs ==
With the surrender of Italy in 1944, the Italian prisoners were quietly shipped out by early spring. Although the POW camp was vacant and deactivated in July, 1944, it was quickly reactivated a month later to prepare for incoming Germans prisoners. By the first of October, 1944, over 2000 German prisoners resided at the camp; the numbers peaked the following summer at 3,011.

The Germans were a less homogeneous group than the Italians, they ranged in age from 14 to 80 years old. Although the majority of German prisoners were characterized as "cooperative" by their guards, a number of hardcore Nazis made up part of the population and caused trouble for the guards by repeatedly cutting through fences to other compounds and harassing their more docile comrades. Camp censors put a halt to their camp newsletter after only two issues due to its rabid Nazi propaganda. A less political paper replaced it and ran for twenty issues.

Prisoners spent time in the camp library or became involved in sports. Others staged plays and concerts or the entertainment of not only their fellow prisoners but the public was invited as well. Artisans among the POWs sketched portraits and made such handcrafted items as shelves and decorative plaques which they glued together using dried cottage cheese from their meals. A number of these items were gifts to Douglas community members and are on display at the Douglas Pioneer Museum.

Like the Italian prisoners before them, the German POWs also provided thousands of hours in agricultural labor for which they were paid daily wages of $4.00. They received one-half of their wages in script they could use in the post exchange; the other half was set aside until their release from the camp. Some thrifty prisoners returned to their homeland with over $500 in savings.

POWs worked in the surrounding area and also were assigned to crop harvest crews in Clearmont, Wheatland, Basin, and Lovell. Others spent time as timber men in nearby Esterbrook and as far away as Ryan's Park in the Medicine Bow Mountains. Guards always accompanied the internees although security might become lax on the job site as escape attempts appeared to be less of a threat away from the camp.

== Escape attempts ==
There were several minor escape attempts at the camp. Guards found two prisoners hiding in a haystack down river from the camp, both clothed in six pairs of G.I. winter underwear. Three Germans hid their escape by the clever use of paper dummies that their comrades propped up during roll call. Another group of escapees made it south about twenty-five miles where they hid out for a week until their capture when they inquired what state they were now in.

== Camp closing ==
By August 1945, as the war wound down, the regional camp commander announced the end of POW labor and that prisoners would now be prepared for repatriation. The Douglas camp gradually released the prisoners beginning in November, 1945, until February 1, 1946, when the camp officially closed. Undoubtedly, there were mixed feelings on both sides as friendships between the prisoners and members of the local community had been forged in spite of being on opposite sides of the war. As a testament to the strength of those ties, correspondence continued for many years between former prisoners and Douglas residents. Overseas visits by Wyomingites and return visits to Douglas by the former POWs also cemented the bond they shared during the war.

The deserted Douglas camp became the property of the War Assets Administration, a federal agency established to dispose of surplus property and provide lumber and other materials for temporary government-approved housing programs. Federal agencies and local governments were given first priority to acquire surplus buildings before they were scrapped. Converse County purchased the camp hospital; the Community Country Club acquired the Officers Club; and School District 17 acquired fifteen buildings and 163 acres for an experimental farm which operated until 1969. Buildings purchased by a lumber company still stand south of the Officers Club. Spiegelberger Lumber and Building Company of Laramie dismantled 137 buildings.

By the 1980s, the site of the former POW camp had become unrecognizable. Interstate 25 cut through the camp, and businesses, housing subdivisions, two large mobile home parks, and a new school building covered many of the 687 acres that once made up the Douglas camp. Only a few local people fought to keep the history of the camp from fading forever.

Among those few were members of the Douglas Lodge #15, Independent Order of Odd Fellows. The Odd Fellows purchased the Officers Club from the Douglas Junior Chamber of Commerce in 1963 for $5,000. Over the years, the local I.O.O.F. lodge has maintained the building and taken pains to protect the unique murals painted by three Italian prisoners of war.

In 2015, the Officers' club became a Wyoming State Historic Site and is now maintained by WY State Parks, Historic Sites and Trails, a Division of WY State Parks and Cultural Resources. The Officers' Club is open to the public during the summer months only June–August and on specific days.

The listing of the former Officer's Club of the Douglas Internment Camp on the National Register of Historic Places is a tribute to those dedicated to its preservation today and to the thousands from the past who made a wartime home at the camp.

== See also ==
- Ryan Park Camp
- Camp Esterbrook
- Camp Dubois, Wyoming
- Centennial POW Camp
- Fort D. A. Russell (Wyoming)
- Wyoming Historical Landmarks

== Bibliography ==
- Bear, Kenneth L. Unpublished paper 'Recalling the Sagebrush Kriegies: Italian and German Prisoners of War Interned at Camp Douglas, 1943-1946'
- Douglas Pioneer Museum files. This excellent and extremely thorough document includes many newspaper clippings of the period from the two Douglas newspapers about the POW Camp and its impact on the local community.
- Douglas Pioneer Museum, Douglas, Wyoming: Douglas POW Camp files.
- Larson, T. A. Wyoming's War Years: 1941 - 1945. Reprint edition,
- Cheyenne, Wyoming Historical Foundation, 1993.
- Leonard, Peg Layton. West of Yesteryear. Johnson Publishing Co., Boulder, Co, 1976.
- Wasch, Diane Shaw, Perry Busch, Keith Landreth, et al., James Glass, "World War II and the U. S. Army Mobilization Program: A History of 700 and 800 Series Cantonment Construction"; Legacy Resources Management Program, United States Department of Defense; United States Department of the Interior, National Park Service, Cultural Resources.
