= Camp Esterbrook =

Historical place in Albany County, Wyomingy, United States

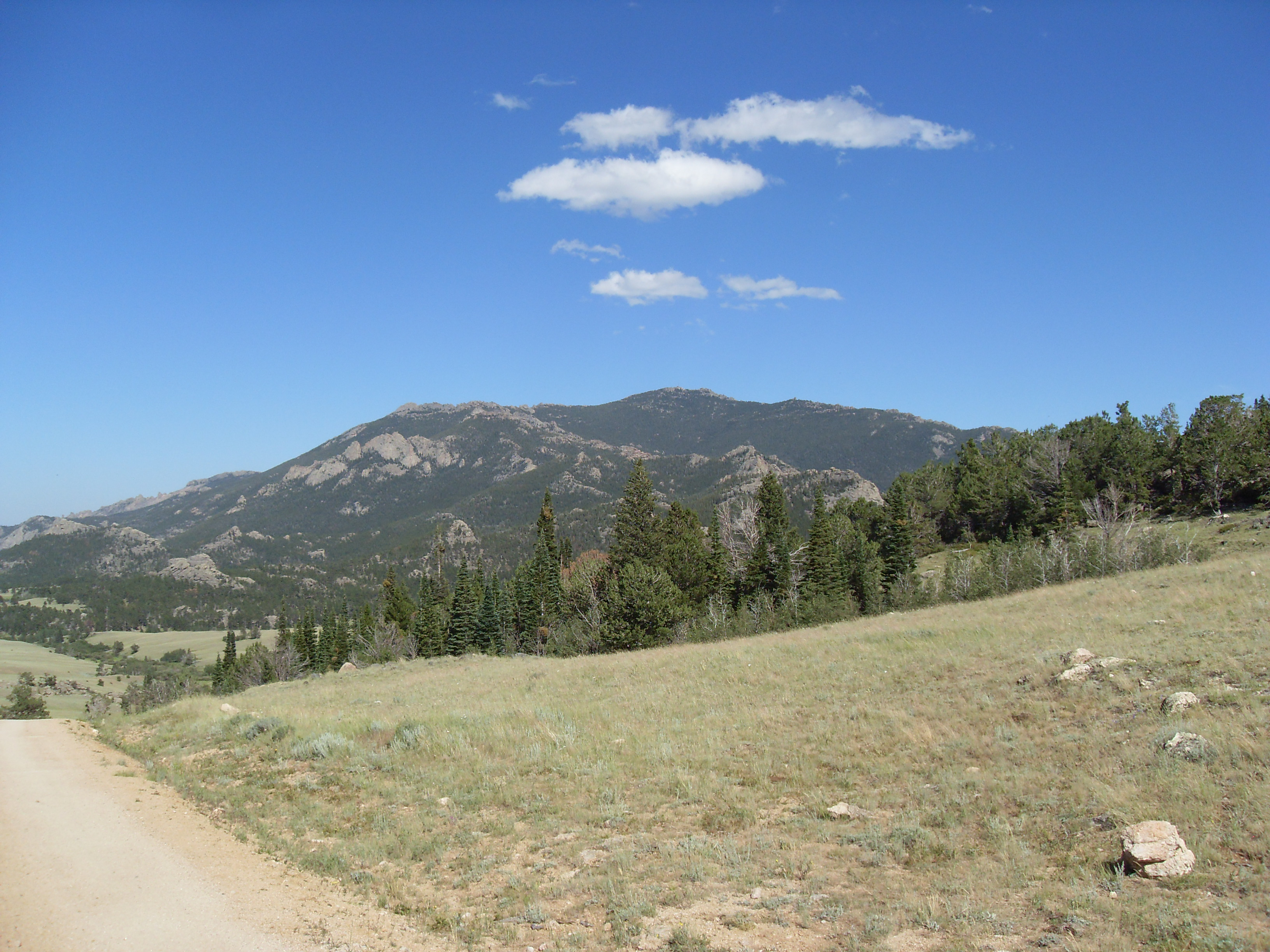
- Laramie Peak site of Camp Esterbrook

- Location within Wyoming Location within the United States
- 42.258472°N 105.481417°W
- Location: Laramie Peak area, Esterbrook, Wyoming

History
- Built for: Civilian Conservation Corps (1933-1939); United States Army (1944-1946)

Site notes
- Governing body: United States Forest Service

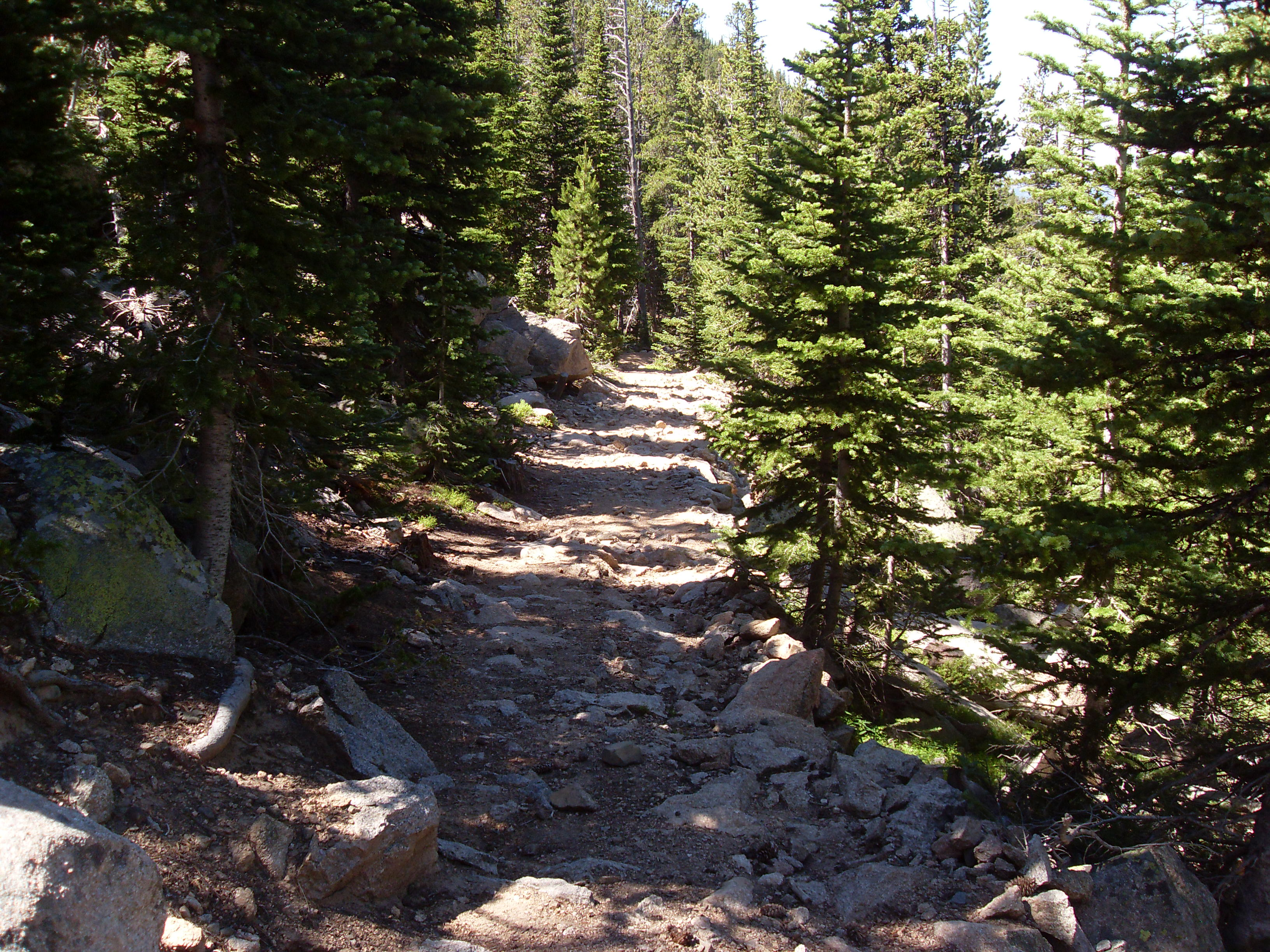
Trail to Laramie Peak

Camp Esterbrook is a historical site in the Medicine Bow National Forest in Albany County of eastern Wyoming in the United States in the Laramie Mountains. Camp Esterbrook was in the Laramie Peak area, closest town is the community of Esterbrook, Wyoming north of the camp. Camp Esterbrook is at about 7,400 feet (2,300 m) elevation near the Esterbrook Creek. Camp Esterbrook opened in spring 1944 and operated as World War 2 Prisoner of war (POW) camp. Today there are a few remains of the camp.

== Civilian Conservation Corps ==
Esterbrook CCC Camp was one of 15 United States Forest Service Civilian Conservation Corps camps in the state Wyoming during the Great Depression. Medicine Bow National Forest had other US Forest Service Civilian Conservation Corps camps: Ryan Park, Forest—at Pole Mountain, Chimney Park, Centennial Work Center, Arlington, Encampment, and French Creek. The worker first lived in tents and them built their own housing. The camp was made up of young unmarried men from the East Coast of the United States. The camp planted tree, build roads, trails, campgrounds, and US Forest ranger stations. The camp built the Esterbrook fire lookout. When needed the camp also worked as firefighters. Many of the Esterbrook CCC Camp projects are still in use today.

== Prisoner of war camp ==
During World War 2, starting in spring 1944 German prisoners were housed at Camp Esterbrook. Camp Esterbrook prisoners of war were used for timber operations. Prisoner of war labor worked for civilian employers under the military officials and the Department of Agriculture's Extension Service. The camp worked six days a week, with Sunday off. The POW Labor Program benefited the US as there was shortage of labor during the war. About 75 POWs lived at the camp, with about 7 Army guards. Most POWs came from Camp Douglas (Wyoming). The local logging companies paid the prisoner labor, now lumberjacks, the same as local civilians. The POWs cut timber for railroad ties`. Evidence can still be found of the camp, including building foundations, wells and latrine pits. At the end of the war the camp closed in January 1946. At first the camp held Italian POWs. In April 1944 the Italians POWs were moved out. German POWs moved in. In April 1944 the Italians were able to volunteer for Italian Service Units, this was non-combat duty in special service units of the United States Army. To join the Italian Service Unit, each Italians volunteer could sign a pledge to perform any non-combat duty to help the United States against the now common enemy, Nazi Germany.

During World War II, two large POW base camps, (Camp Douglas and Fort Francis E. Warren), and seventeen smaller camps that did agricultural and timber work were located in Wyoming. Other smaller camps in Wyoming were: Basin, Wyoming (sugar beet harvest), Clearmont (sugar beet harvest), Deaver (sugar beet harvest), Dubois (timber camp), Esterbrook (timber camp), Huntley (sugar beet harvest), Lingle (agriculture), Lovell (remodeling the Lovell Armory and Cavalry Barn, and then sugar beet harvest), Pine Bluffs (sugar beet and potato harvest), Powell (sugar beet harvest), Riverton (sugar beet harvest), Torrington (agriculture), Veteran (agriculture), Wheatland (agriculture), Ryan Park Camp (timber), Centennial POW Camp (timber) and Worland (agriculture).

== See also ==
- Camp Douglas (Wyoming)
