= Carbon County, Wyoming monuments and markers =

Historic places in Wyoming, United States

Map of Wyoming highlighting Carbon County

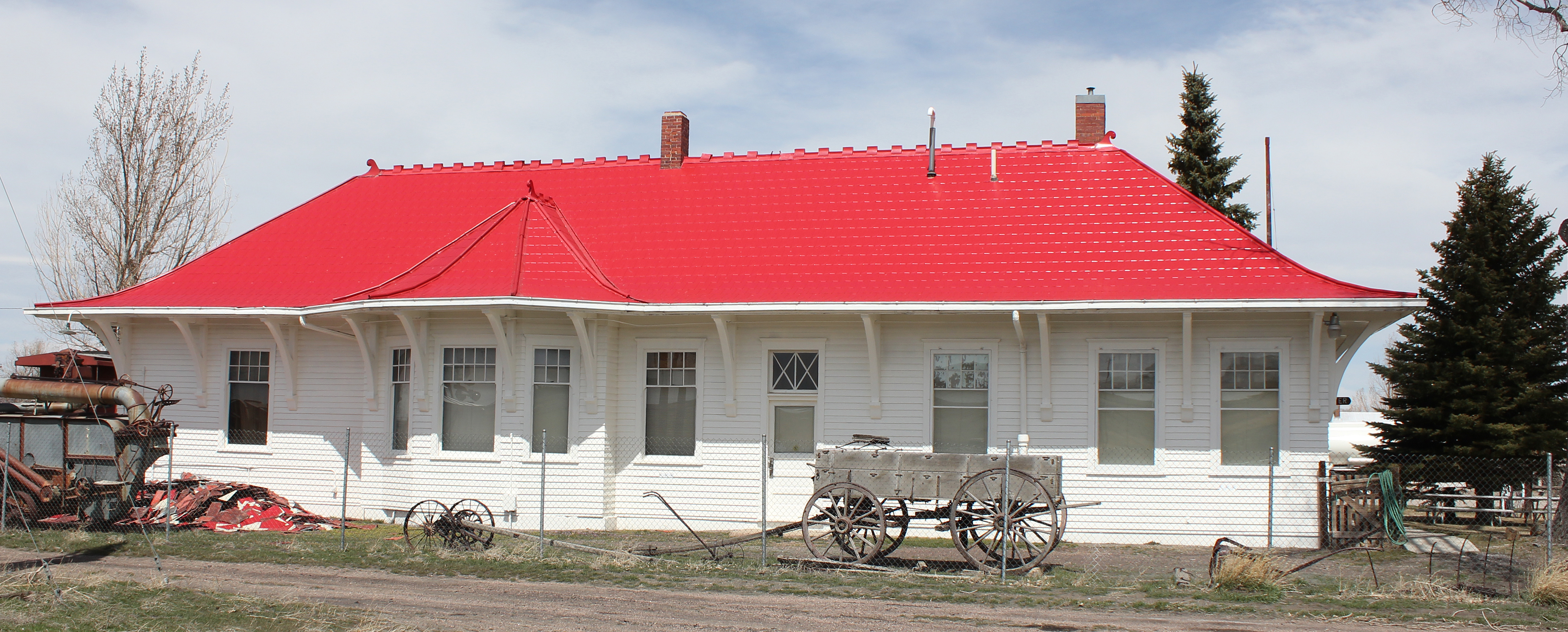
Medicine Bow Union Pacific Depot

Carbon County, Wyoming monuments and markers are markers, signs, and plaques installed at important historical sites in Carbon County, Wyoming. The historical markers were installed by the State of Wyoming, nonprofit organizations, and private parties. For the state, different departments have participated in the program including: Wyoming Division of State Parks and Historic Sites, the Wyoming Department of Transportation, and Wyoming Office of Tourism. The State of Wyoming has one of the oldest sign and marker programs in the United States.

== Markers ==
Carbon County, Wyoming Monuments and Markers
City	Landmark name	location	notes
Arlington	Old Rock Creek Stage Crossing	Elk Mountain and Arlington Road near I-80; 41.5948°N 106.2093°W	Overland Trail crossing 1862-1868
Elk Mountain	Overland Trail	Medicine Bow Road and Medicine Bow Ranger Station Road	Wagon and stagecoach route through Wyoming and Colorado which connected with the Oregon Trail.
Elk Mountain	Wagonhound Tipi Rings	I-80 and Elk Mountain Arlington Road	Prehistoric Native American campsite. Multiple markers at site.
Elk Mountain	Old Cherokee Trail	I-80 and Elk Mountain Arlington Road	Trail ran from Oklahoma, Kansas, Colorado, and Wyoming that was used from 1840s to 1890s.
Elk Mountain	Fort Halleck	Rattlesnake Pass Road near I-80; 41.698900°N 106.523100°W	Built in 1862, west of the Medicine Bow River at the north base of the Elk Mountain after Henry Wager Halleck
Encampment	Grand Encampment	201 McCaffrey Avenue	Site was rendezvous point of Indians and trappers.
Medicine Bow	Owen Wister	405 Lincoln Hwy	Wister wrote about pioneer Wyoming ranch life, wrote the 1902 novel The Virginian.
Medicine Bow	United Air Lines Flight 409	Hwy 130; 41.341530°N 106.305860°W	Bronze memorial plaque was dedicated in the Miner's Camp turnout to the loss of Flight 409.
Medicine Bow	Medicine Bow station	405 Lincoln Hwy	Medicine Bow Union Pacific Depot was built 1912–1919. National Register of Historic Places. Multiple markers at the site.
Medicine Bow	George A. Wyman	405 U.S Highway 30	George A. Wyman was 1st to across America from San Francisco to New York City in 1903 on motor bike.
Muddy Gap	Muddy Gap	State Highway 220 and U.S. 287; 42.362200°N 107.442983°W	Muddy Gap at a crossroads on Oregon Trail.
Rawlins	Rawlins Springs	201 5th Street	In 1867, Grenville M. Dodge looking for a route for the Union Pacific Railroad, found Rawlins Springs.
Rawlins	Rawlins Paint Mines	U.S. 287 near Gun Club Road	Ancient reddish rocks, hematite mined from 1870 to the early 1900s.
Rawlins	William Daley Flagpole	2415 West Pine Street	In honor of pioneer William Daley (1844-1922)
Rawlins	Rawlins Paint Mines	U.S. 287 near Gun Club Road	Ancient reddish rocks, hematite mined from 1870 to the early 1900s.
Rawlins	Northern Boundary of The Republic of Texas	904 West Walnut Street	On April 21, 1836, General Sam Houston defeated General Antonio López de Santa Anna, granting Texas the Texas northern boundary of The Republic of Texas was in Wyoming.
Ryan Park Camp	Ryan Park Camp	Hwy 130; 41.326667°N 106.492944°W	Civilian Conservation Corps camp then World War II Prisoner of war (POW) camp.
Saratoga	Thomas A. Edison	State Highway 70; 41.158617°N 107.009717°W	Edison camped near this spot in 1878, while on a fishing trip. A bamboo fishing pole was used later for a lamp bulb filament.
Saratoga	Saratoga World War II Veterans Memorial	113 East Bridge Avenue	World War II US Army Veterans Memorial.
Saratoga	Storer - Saratoga Lake Wetland	Saratoga Lake Campground Road; 41.474600°N 106.791700°W	Wyoming Game and Fish Department wetland.
Saratoga	Overland Trail; Platte River Crossing	Wyoming Highway 130; 41.614350°N 106.815367°W	Overland Trail at the Platte River crossing, 1861 to 1868.
Seminoe Dam	Seminoe Dam	42.155833°N 106.908333°W	Seminoe Dam on North Platte River built in 1939
Sinclair	Fenimore Chatterton	County Route 347 near I-80; 41.774383°N 106.947100°W	Sixth governor of Wyoming from 1903 to 1905.
Sinclair	Civil War Cannons	498 Lincoln Avenue	US Civil War Cannon use in oil field tank farm equipment.
Sinclair	The Parco Inn	400 Lincoln Avenue	1925 Inn built by Fisher and Fisher for Frank Kistler, founder of the Producers & Refiners Corporation (PARCO), National Register of Historic Places and Historic district.
Sinclair	Fort Fred Steele	County Route 347 and I-80; 41.778333°N 106.947500°W	The fort was built in 1868, where the railroad crossed the North Platte River. Multiple markers at the site.
Sinclair	Post Trader's House	Fort Fred Steele	Post Trader's House at Fort Fred Steele. Multiple markers at site.
Sinclair	Ranching Central	Fort Steele; I-80 rest area at Exit 228; 41.753717°N 106.951017°W	Ranching industry sheep and cattle. Multiple markers at site
Sinclair	Fort Steele Schoolhouse	Fort Fred Steel; County Route 347 and I-80; 41.778333°N 106.947500°W	Fort schoolhouse built in 1919. Multiple markers at site.
Sinclair	Fort Steele Enlisted Men's Barracks	Fort Fred Steel; County Route 347 and I-80; 41.778333°N 106.947500°W	Enlisted Men's Barracks of Fort Steele. Multiple markers at site
Wamsutter	The Overland Stage Station Route	State Highway 789; 41.457617°N 107.762300°W	The Overland Stage operated from 1862 to 1868, stopped at the Washakee Station.
Wamsutter	Overland Trail	State Highway 789 near I-80; 41.457800°N 107.762300°W	Overland Trail a busy trail in the 1860s for emigrants, freight and mail, and stagecoaches. Ran between the Missouri River and the west coast.

== See also ==
- List of National Historic Landmarks in Wyoming
- National Register of Historic Places listings in Wyoming
- Albany County, Wyoming monuments and markers
