= CM Ranch and Simpson Lake Cabins =

- U.S. National Register of Historic Places
- U.S. Historic district
- Location within Wyoming Location within the United States
- Nearest city: Dubois, Wyoming
- Coordinates: 43°28′08″N 109°39′03″W (CM Ranch)
- Area: 1,312.4 acres (531.1 ha)
- Built by: Charles Moore
- Architectural style: Log cabin
- NRHP reference No.: 92001249
- Added to NRHP: September 15, 1992

The CM Ranch and Simpson Lake Cabins are separate components of a single historic district associated with Charles Cornell Moore, a Fremont County, Wyoming dude ranch operator. The CM ranch, named after Moore, operated as a dude ranch from 1920 to 1942 and resumed operating in 1945. The Simpson Lake Cabins were purchased by Moore in 1931 and were operated as a hunting camp, continuing until 1997 when the CM ranch was sold to new owners and the Simpson Lake property was taken over by the U.S. Forest Service.. The sites are separated by 13 miles (21 km).

== CM Ranch ==
The CM Ranch is located in the Wind River Mountains at the mouth of Jakey's Fork Canyon, surrounded by red sandstone mesas at an altitude of 7,000 feet (2,100 m). The canyon is named after Charles Moore's father, J.K. Moore. The ranch was built starting in 1920 as a dude ranch, the oldest in Fremont County. Charles C. Moore was a Wyoming native who had studies in the East, obtaining a law degree at the University of Michigan, but also participating in Buffalo Bill's Wild West Show. Although he practiced law in Cheyenne, he developed ventures such as a boy's camping operation in the Yellowstone area. As these ventures prospered Moore moved into dude ranching, eventually becoming president of the Dude Rancher's Association. Moore's ranch prospered even through the Great Depression, but closed for World War II. It reopened in 1945. Moore sold the ranch to Les and Alice Shoemaker in 1952, and died in 1971. The ranch was sold to siblings Jay Kemmerer, Connie Kemmerer and Betty Gray in 1997.

=== Description ===
The CM Ranch is an extensive complex of log buildings, usually built on stone foundations. A complex of guest cabins surrounds the core of the ranch. The dining hall is the main building. Nearby is an office cabin, bunkhouses and an employee dormitory. Livestock are accommodated by a barn and corral. The recreation hall is a converted cabin with activity and quiet space. Larger cabins served as residences for long-term guests and the owners.

== Simpson Lake Cabins ==
The Simpson Lake Cabins are located in the present-day Fitzpatrick Wilderness in Shoshone National Forest on Simpson Lake. Access is by horseback. Before its purchase it was known as the Three Waters Hunting and Fishing Camp, built in 1928 by Nobe Harrison, Earl Nichols and Les Wright for touring hunters. The venture did not prosper and in 1931 they sold the camp to Moore. The camp was operated as a branch of the CM Ranch until 1997, when the CM was sold to new owners and the camp reverted to Shoshone National Forest.

=== Description ===
The camp complex includes three cabins, a meathouse, corrals and two outhouses. All structures are of log construction on stone foundation. All materials and furnishings were hauled by horse to Moon Lake, floated across and taken up to the site, again by horse.

== Designation ==
The CM Ranch and Simpson Lake Cabins were listed on the National Register of Historic Places on September 15, 1992. The ranch continues in operation. The cabins have been the object of maintenance work by HistoriCorps and are not in use.
