= Ryan Park Camp =

Historical place in Carbon County, Wyoming, United States

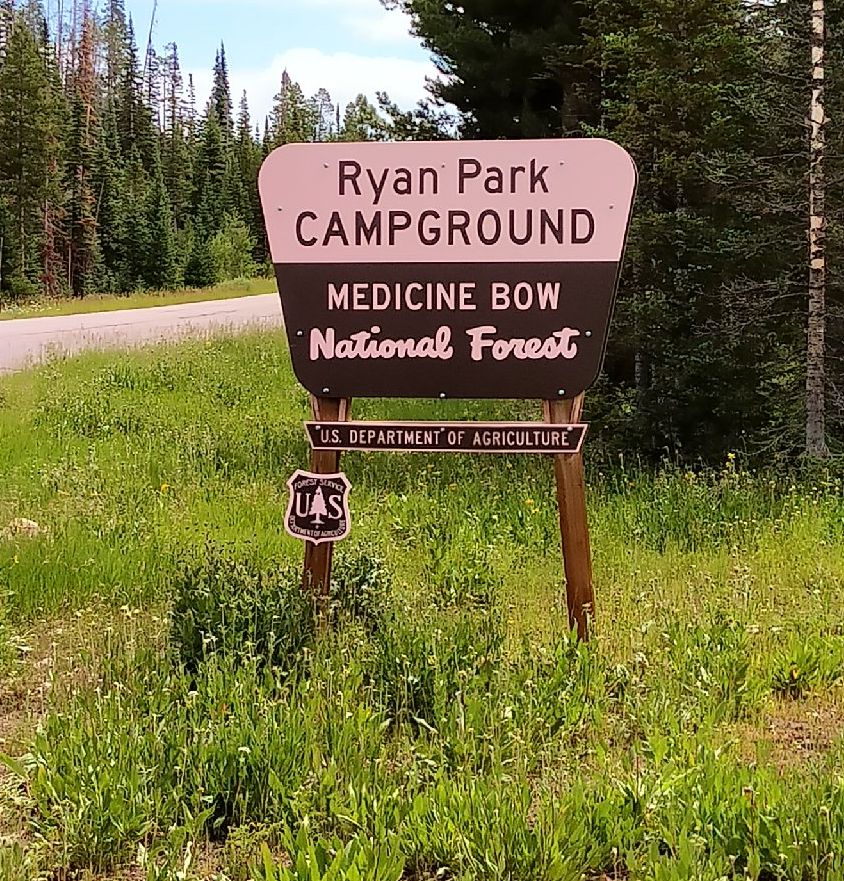
- United States Forest Service Ryan Park campground, site of the historical Ryan Park Camp

- Location within Wyoming Location within the United States
- 41.326667°N 106.492944°W
- Location: Ryan Park, Wyoming

History
- Built: 1930
- Built for: Civilian Conservation Corps (1930-1939); United States Army (1942-1945)

Site notes
- Governing body: United States Forest Service

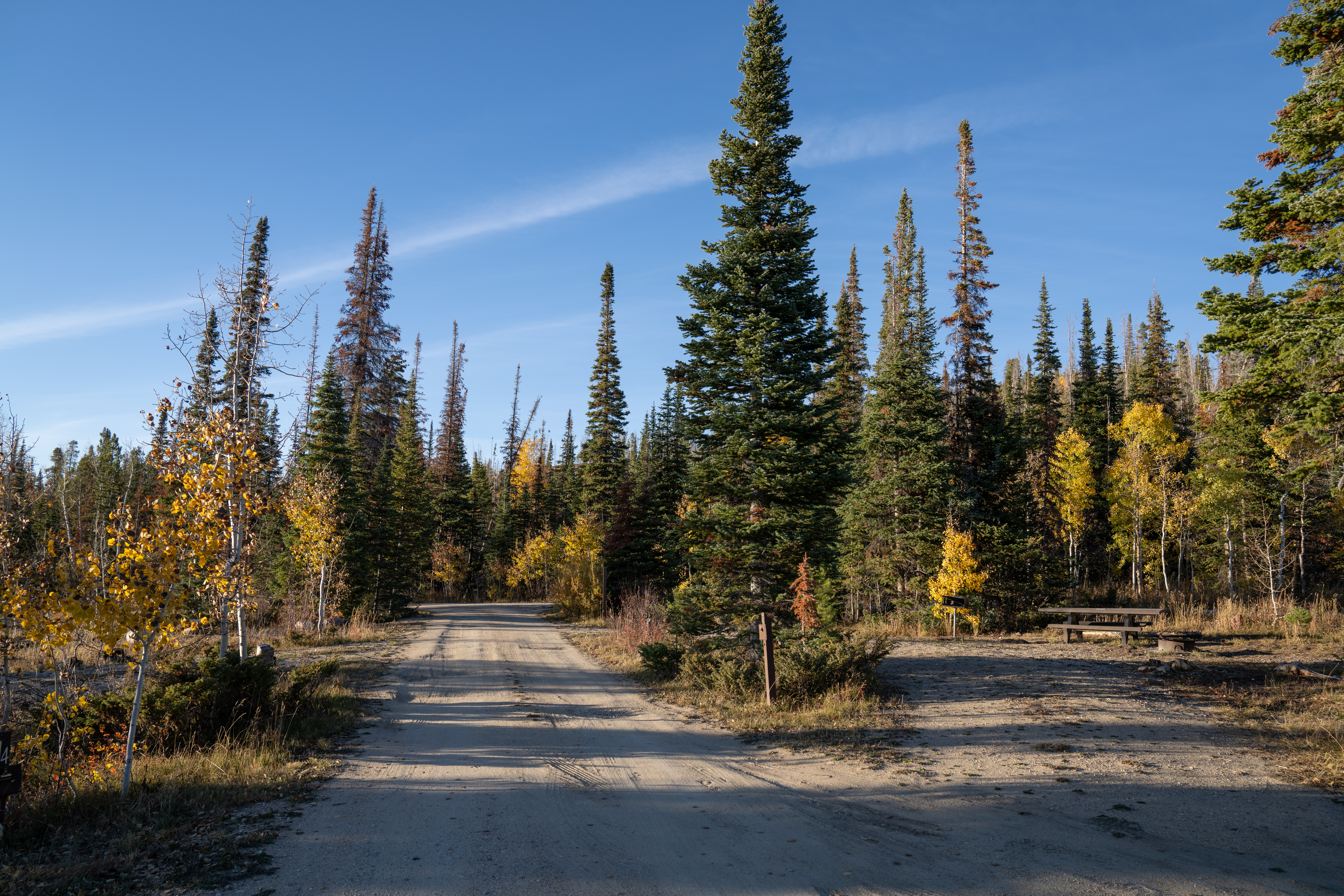
United States Forest Service Ryan Park campground, site of the historical Ryan Park Camp

Ryan Park Camp is a historical site, 1 mile (1.6 km) east of the community of Ryan Park, Wyoming in Carbon County, Wyoming. The camp opened in 1930 as a Civilian Conservation Corps (CCC) camp during the Great Depression. Ryan Park Camp is at 8,009 feet (2,441 m) elevation in the Snowy Range of Wyoming's Rocky Mountains in the Medicine Bow National Forest on Wyoming Highway 130. Civilian Conservation Corps was supervised by the United States Forest Service. Civilian Conservation Corps camp closed in 1939. From 1942 to 1945 Ryan Park Camp operated as World War 2 Prisoner of war (POW) camp. Today there are no remains of the camp. The site is now a United States Forest Service public campground. A historical maker is at the entrance to the campground. Ryan Park Camp is named after Tom T. Ryan, who in 1879 founded a sawmill on the site on the western slopes of the Medicine Bow Mountains.

== Civilian Conservation Corps ==
Ryan Park CCC Camp also called Ryan Park Side Camp (F-22-W), was one of 15 United States Forest Service Civilian Conservation Corps camps in the state Wyoming during the Great Depression. Medicine Bow National Forest had seven US Forest Service Civilian Conservation Corps camps: Ryan Park, Forest—at Pole Mountain, Chimney Park, Centennial Work Center, Arlington, Encampment, and French Creek. The worker first lived in tents and then built their own housing. The camp was made up of young unmarried men from the East Coast of the United States. The camp planted trees, built roads, trails, campgrounds, and US Forest ranger stations. The camp built the Brush Creek US Forest Ranger Station and Brush Creek Work Center, which is on the U.S. National Register of Historic Places list. When needed the camp also worked as firefighters. Many of the Ryan Park CCC Camp projects are still in use today.

== Prisoner of war camp ==
During World War 2, starting in 1942, Italian, German, and Austrian prisoners were housed at Ryan Park Camp. Ryan Park Camp prisoners of war were used for timber operations. Prisoner of war labor worked for civilian employers under the military officials and the Department of Agriculture's Extension Service. At Ryan Park the Camp prisoners worked for the R.R Crow Timber Company. R.R Crow had request POW workers, due to the war labor shortage. Crow Timber Company cut and made railroad ties at the Crow sawmill. The camp worked six days a week, with Sunday off. The POW Labor Program benefited the US as there was shortage of labor during the war. About 164 POWs lived at the camp, with about 40 Army guards. The local logging companies paid the prisoner labor, now lumberjacks, the same as local civilians. The pay was given in camp scrip. The scrip could be used at the camp store for candy, soda pop, stamps to write home and other items. At first the camp held Italians POWs. Locals enjoyed the Italians at Ryan Park as on Saturday afternoon they could hear the prisoners play music and watch them dance. In April 1944 the Italians POWs were moved out. German and Austrian POWs moved in. In April 1944 the Italians were able to volunteer for Italian Service Units, this was non-combat duty in special service units of the United States Army. To join the Italian Service Unit, each Italians volunteer could sign a pledge to perform any non-combat duty to help the United States against the now common enemy, Nazi Germany. About 200 young German POWs worked at Ryan Park Camp. Ryan Park Camp has one German escape event. Four German POWs escaped in July 1944, three days later they were found in the grandstand of near by rodeo. At the end of the war the camp closed in 1945. During World War II, two large POW base camps, (Camp Douglas and Fort Francis E. Warren), and seventeen smaller camps that did agricultural and timber work were located in Wyoming. The next closest POW camp to Ryan Park POW Camp was the Centennial POW Camp on Mullen Creek, the former Mullen Creek CCC Camp. Other smaller camps in Wyoming were: Basin, Wyoming (sugar beet harvest), Clearmont (sugar beet harvest), Deaver (sugar beet harvest), Dubois (timber camp), Camp Esterbrook (timber camp), Huntley (sugar beet harvest), Lingle (agriculture), Lovell (remodeling the Lovell Armory and Cavalry Barn, and then sugar beet harvest), Pine Bluffs (sugar beet and potato harvest), Powell (sugar beet harvest), Riverton (sugar beet harvest), Torrington (agriculture), Veteran (agriculture), Wheatland (agriculture), and Worland (agriculture).

== Campground ==
At the site of the former Prisoner of war camp is now the United States Forest Service Ryan Park campground. Ryan Park campground has 47 single camp sites on three loops. The Campground is open seasonally from June to September, but dates are weather dependent. An interpretive trail, called the Moose Trail, follows perimeter of the Ryan Park Campground. Ryan Park Campground is 23 miles (37 km) east of Saratoga, Wyoming.

== See also ==
- Camp Douglas (Wyoming)
- Carbon County, Wyoming monuments and markers
