= Wyoming Centennial Scenic Byway =

Scenic highway in Wyoming, United States

Wyoming Centennial Scenic Byway National Forest Scenic Byway

Route information
- Maintained by WYDOT
- Length: 163 mi (262 km)
- Component highways: US 26; US 189

Major junctions
- South end: Pinedale
- North end: Dubois

Location
- Country: United States
- State: Wyoming
- Counties: Sublette, Teton, Fremont

Highway system
- Scenic Byways; National; National Forest; BLM; NPS; Wyoming State Highway System; Interstate; US; State

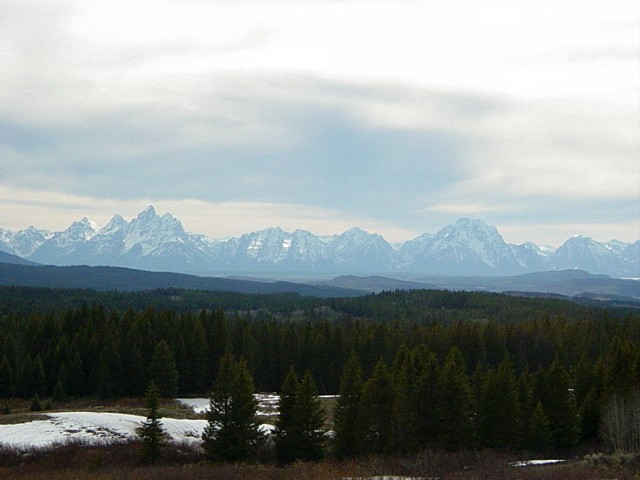
Teton Range from just east of Togwotee Pass on the Wyoming Centennial Scenic Byway

Wyoming Centennial Scenic Byway is a 163 miles (262 km) scenic byway in the U.S. state of Wyoming. The Byway connects the communities of Dubois, Jackson, and Pinedale. It traverses Sublette, Teton, and Fremont counties utilizing U.S. Route 26 (US 26) and US 189. It was designated as a Forest Service Byway in 1989 and named for the 100th anniversary of Wyoming's statehood. It was designated because of its "cultural and historical background as well as the diverse variety and beauty in landscapes and ecosystems the Byway passes through".

== Route description ==
The scenic byway passes through both Shoshone and Bridger-Teton National Forests as well as Grand Teton National Park. It crosses the continental divide at Togwotee Pass.

Some sites along the trail are the National Bighorn Sheep Interpretive Center in Dubois, Museum of the Mountain Man in Pinedale, the Hoback canyon, and the National Museum of Wildlife Art in Jackson. There is also the National Elk Refuge in Jackson Hole.

The road passes along the Absaroka Range while in Shoshone National Forest and Teton Range while in Bridger-Teton National Forest. These mountains display high meadows, coniferous and aspen meadows and opportunities to see elk, pronghorn, coyote, moose, and various raptors. A section of the Byway runs parallel to Blackrock Creek which gives views of alternating wide valleys and meadows and narrow forested canyons. There are also sagebrush flats, willows, and ranch land.

== Major intersections ==
County	Location	mi	km	Destinations	Notes
Sublette	Pinedale	0	0.0	US 191	Southern terminus.
Sublette	Daniel Junction			US 189 south	
Teton	Jackson			US 26 / US 89 / US 191 / WYO 22	
Teton	Moran Junction			US 26 / US 287	
Fremont	Dubois	163	262		Northern terminus.
1.000 mi = 1.609 km; 1.000 km = 0.621 mi

== See also ==
- Tie Hack Historical Monument
