= HistoriCorps =

American non-profit organization

- Established: 2013
- Type: Nonprofit focused on preservation of historic buildings
- Location: Colorado
- Website: www.historicorps.org

HistoriCorps is a 501(c)(3) nonprofit whose volunteers and staff work to save and preserve historic places in the USA which require repair.

In its first year as a nonprofit, HistoriCorps had preserved over 150 historic structures in 24 states. HistoriCorps has formalized partnerships with federal, state, and local governments as well as community-based nonprofits. Federal partners include the U.S. Forest Service, Bureau of Land Management, National Park Service, and the U.S. Fish and Wildlife Service.

In 2022, HistoriCorps volunteers completed more than 40 projects to restore and preserve historic structures across the USA, including fire lookout towers, cabins that were the residence of early European-American pioneers, ranger stations, ranches, and structures originally built by the Civilian Conservation Corps (CCC).

The work of HistoriCorps and its volunteers has been cited by the US Forest Service, the Advisory Council on Historic Preservation, California State Parks, the Aspen Daily News, Cronkite News, and KCRA.

== See also ==
- Architectural conservation
- Historic preservation
- Cultural heritage management
- Cultural resources management
