= National Bighorn Sheep Interpretive Center =

Coordinates: 43.53731°N 109.64503°W

National Bighorn Sheep Center
- Established: 1993
- Location: 10 Bighorn Lane. Dubois, Wyoming, United States
- Type: Interpretive Center
- Website: Official website

The National Bighorn Sheep Center (formerly known as the National Bighorn Sheep Interpretative Center) is a 2,775-square-foot (257.8 m^{2}) Interpretive Center dedicated to public education about the biology and habitat of the Rocky Mountain Bighorn Sheep with specific focus on the currently largest herd of Rocky Mountain Bighorn sheep in the coterminous United States that winter in the Whisky Basin of Whisky Mountain adjacent to the Fitzpatrick Wilderness in the Shoshone National Forest. The Center preserves and interprets the relationships of the Bighorn sheep and is located in the town of Dubois, Wyoming on U.S. Route 26 along the Wyoming Centennial Scenic Byway. The museum offers interpretive programs, exhibits, multi-media presentations, and special events.

== Exhibits ==
The center contains several permanent exhibits including the four native wild sheep of North America, an International Super Slam with twelve shoulder mounts of international species of wild sheep, and "Snowflake", the albino Rocky Mountain bighorn sheep.

- The Natural History of the Bighorn sheep featuring displays including the geology of the Wind River, the flora and fauna including the native cutthroat trout and bighorn sheep
- The Mountain Shoshone, known as the Sheepeaters, and how they lived as interpreted from the steatite tools, horn bows crafted from bighorn sheep horn, and petroglyphs left from ancestors
- The role of creative conservation to create and preserve habitat.

== See also ==
- Dubois Museum
