= Fort D. A. Russell (Wyoming) =

Former US Army post in Cheyenne, Wyoming

- U.S. National Register of Historic Places
- U.S. National Historic Landmark District
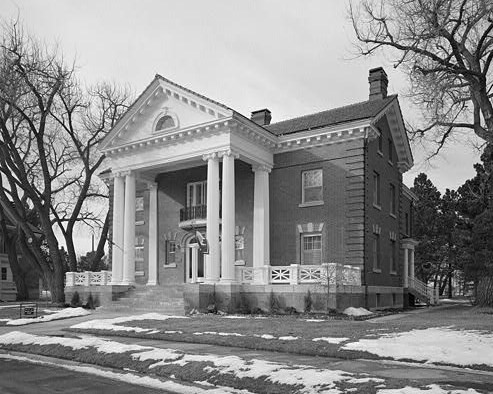
- Commanding Officer's Quarters, Fort David A. Russell

- Location within Wyoming Location within the United States
- Location: Laramie County, adjacent to west side of Cheyenne, Wyoming
- Coordinates: 41°09′59″N 104°51′46″W
- Area: 630 acres (250 ha)
- Built: 1867
- NRHP reference No.: 69000191

Significant dates
- Added to NRHP: October 1, 1969
- Designated NHLD: May 15, 1975

Fort D. A. Russell, also known as Fort Francis E. Warren, Francis E. Warren Air Force Base and Fort David A. Russell, was a post and base of operations for the United States Army, and later the Air Force, located in Cheyenne, Wyoming. The fort had been established in 1867 to protect workers for the Union Pacific Railroad. It was named in honor of David Allen Russell, a Civil War general killed at the Battle of Opequon. In 1930, the fort's name was changed to Fort Francis E. Warren. In 1949, it became Francis E. Warren Air Force Base.

Over the years, the base served as home for numerous influential American military leaders such as Carl Spaatz, Black Jack Pershing, Billy Mitchell, Walter Reed, and Mark Clark. A portion of the base was designated a National Historic Landmark District in 1975, for distinctively preserving many of the stages of its evolution from a frontier cavalry base to an Air Force base.

== History ==
Units of the 30th Infantry under Colonel John D. Stevenson began building the fort and nearby quartermaster depot (Cheyenne Depot) in August 1867. In September the first cavalry arrived, Company H of 2nd Cavalry In 1884, it became a permanent base. It was the home to three Black regiments: the 9th and 10th Cavalry and the 24th Infantry (the famous Buffalo Soldiers) for much of the late 19th century.

By the turn of the 20th century, Fort D. A. Russell was one of the largest cavalry bases in the United States and several more expansions in the early 20th century further increased its size.

In 1919, the airfield became active and soon served as the home field for over 100 military aircraft. During the transition from cavalry to airplanes, the post was commanded by Edmund Wittenmyer, a veteran of World War I. The last cavalry units on the post were deactivated in 1927. In 1930, the base was renamed Fort Francis E. Warren. Warren was a Medal of Honor recipient who served as Governor of Wyoming.

During World War II, Fort Francis E. Warren served as a training facility for the US Army Quartermaster Corps. A prisoner of war camp was also constructed on the site.

In 1949, the base was redesignated the Francis E. Warren Air Force Base and became part of the Strategic Air Command in 1958. The base became the headquarters for the 90th Strategic Missile Wing in 1963. The wing controlled over 200 ICBMs during the Cold War. The base was the only missile wing to have Peacekeeper missiles which were deactivated in October 2005.

On October 1, 1993, the Twentieth Air Force, which controls all of America's ICBM wings, relocated its headquarters to Warren.

The fort was designated a National Historic Landmark on May 15, 1975, while still Francis E. Warren Air Force Base.

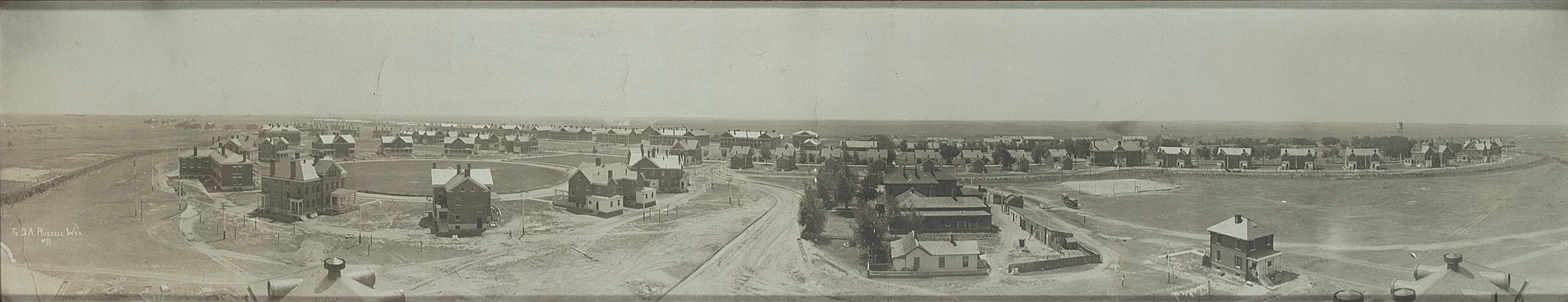
Fort D. A. Russell

== Renovations ==
The majority of the structures in the historic district have been maintained. At least 88 housing units have been abated for lead and asbestos materials. Three buildings were renovated in accordance with standards of the U.S. Secretary of the Interior. The Air Force was tasked to restore the two deck porches on many buildings in the district.

== See also ==
- Camp Douglas (Wyoming)
- Ryan Park Camp
- Centennial POW Camp
- Fort D. A. Russell (Texas)
