= Ryan Park, Wyoming =

Census-designated place in Carbon County, Wyoming, United States

- Census-designated place
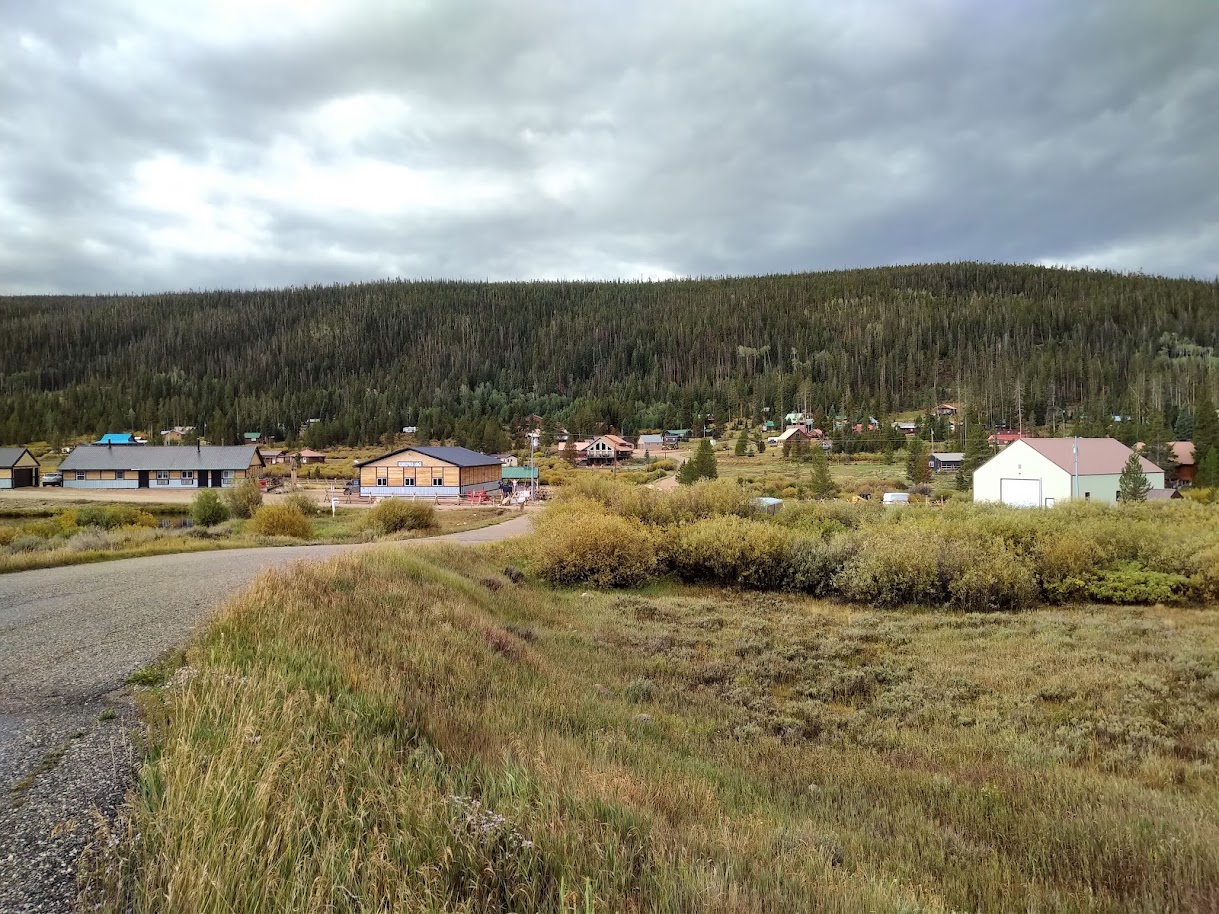
- Community of Ryan Park, Wyoming

- Location in Carbon County and the state of Wyoming

- Location within Wyoming Location within the United States
- Coordinates: 41°19′17″N 106°30′32″W
- Country: United States
- State: Wyoming
- County: Carbon

Area
  - Total: 2.1 sq mi (5.4 km^{2})
  - Land: 2.1 sq mi (5.4 km^{2})
  - Water: 0 sq mi (0.0 km^{2})
- Elevation: 8,359 ft (2,548 m)

Population (2010)
  - Total: 38
  - Density: 18/sq mi (7.0/km^{2})
- Time zone: UTC-7 (Mountain (MST))
  - Summer (DST): UTC-6 (MDT)
- Area code: 307
- FIPS code: 56-67670
- GNIS feature ID: 1602659

Ryan Park is a census-designated place (CDP) in Carbon County, Wyoming, United States, that is located within the Medicine Bow–Routt National Forest. "Ryan Park" is designated as an acceptable place name by the United States Postal Service for mailing addresses and is assigned the ZIP code (82331) of Saratoga, the nearest incorporated town. The population was 38 at the 2010 census.

Ryan Park Camp is a historical site 1 mile (1.6 km) west of the community of Ryan Park.

== Geography ==
According to the United States Census Bureau, the CDP has a total area of 2.1 square miles (5.4 km^{2}), all land.

== See also ==
- List of census-designated places in Wyoming
