= Huntley, Wyoming =

- CDP
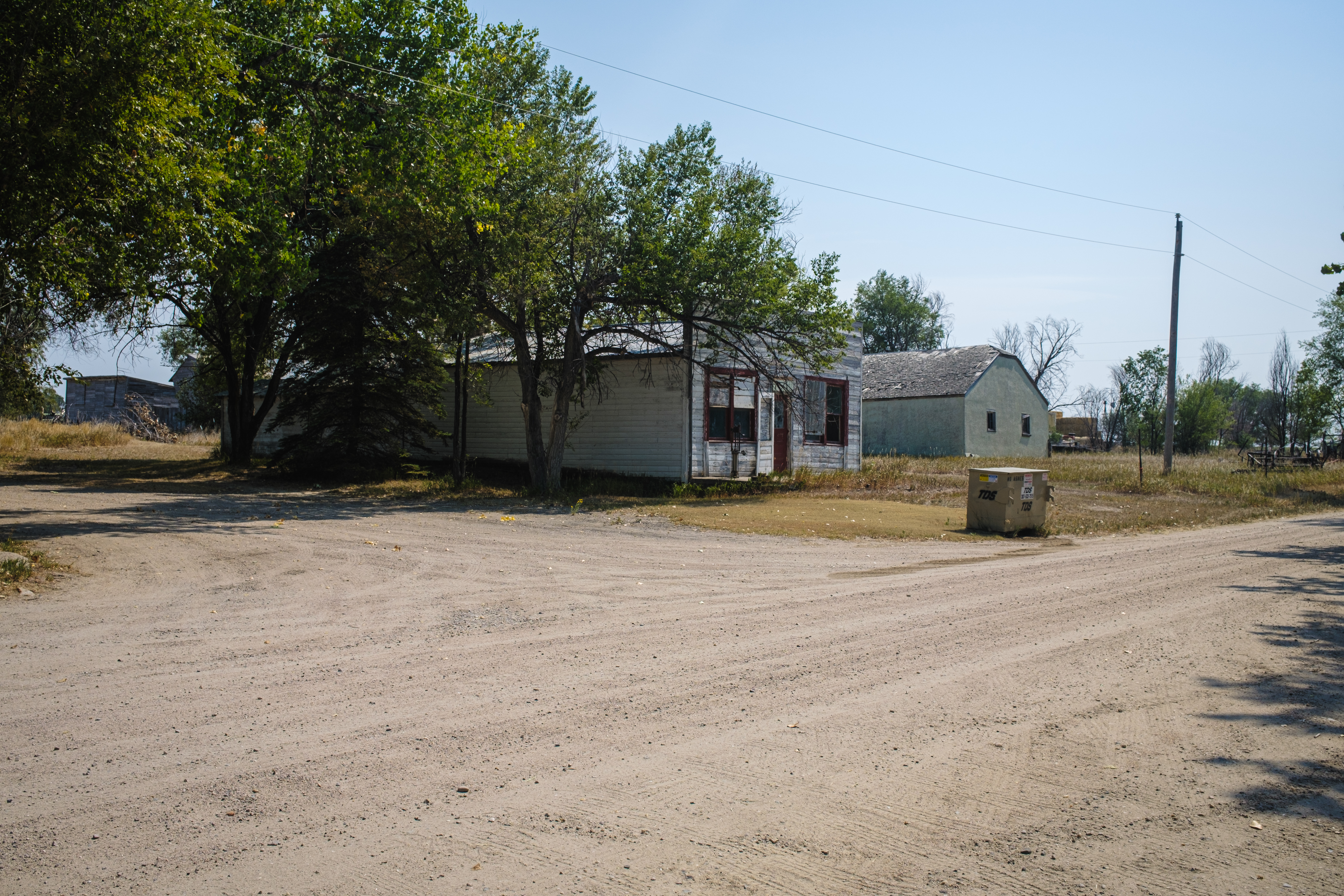
- Street view of Huntley

- Location in Goshen County and the state of Wyoming
- Coordinates: 41°55′58″N 104°08′46″W
- Country: United States
- State: Wyoming
- County: Goshen

Area
  - Total: 0.27 sq mi (0.7 km^{2})
  - Land: 0.27 sq mi (0.7 km^{2})
  - Water: 0 sq mi (0.0 km^{2})
- Elevation: 4,236 ft (1,291 m)

Population (2010)
  - Total: 30
  - Density: 110/sq mi (43/km^{2})
- Time zone: UTC-7 (Mountain (MST))
  - Summer (DST): UTC-6 (MDT)
- ZIP code: 82218
- Area code: 307
- FIPS code: 56-39250
- GNIS feature ID: 1589822

Huntley is a census-designated place (CDP) in Goshen County, Wyoming, United States. The population was 30 according to the 2010 census.

Former Wyoming Governor Stanley K. Hathaway grew up on a farm here, and graduated from Huntley High School as class valedictorian in 1941. He was the only one in his senior class.

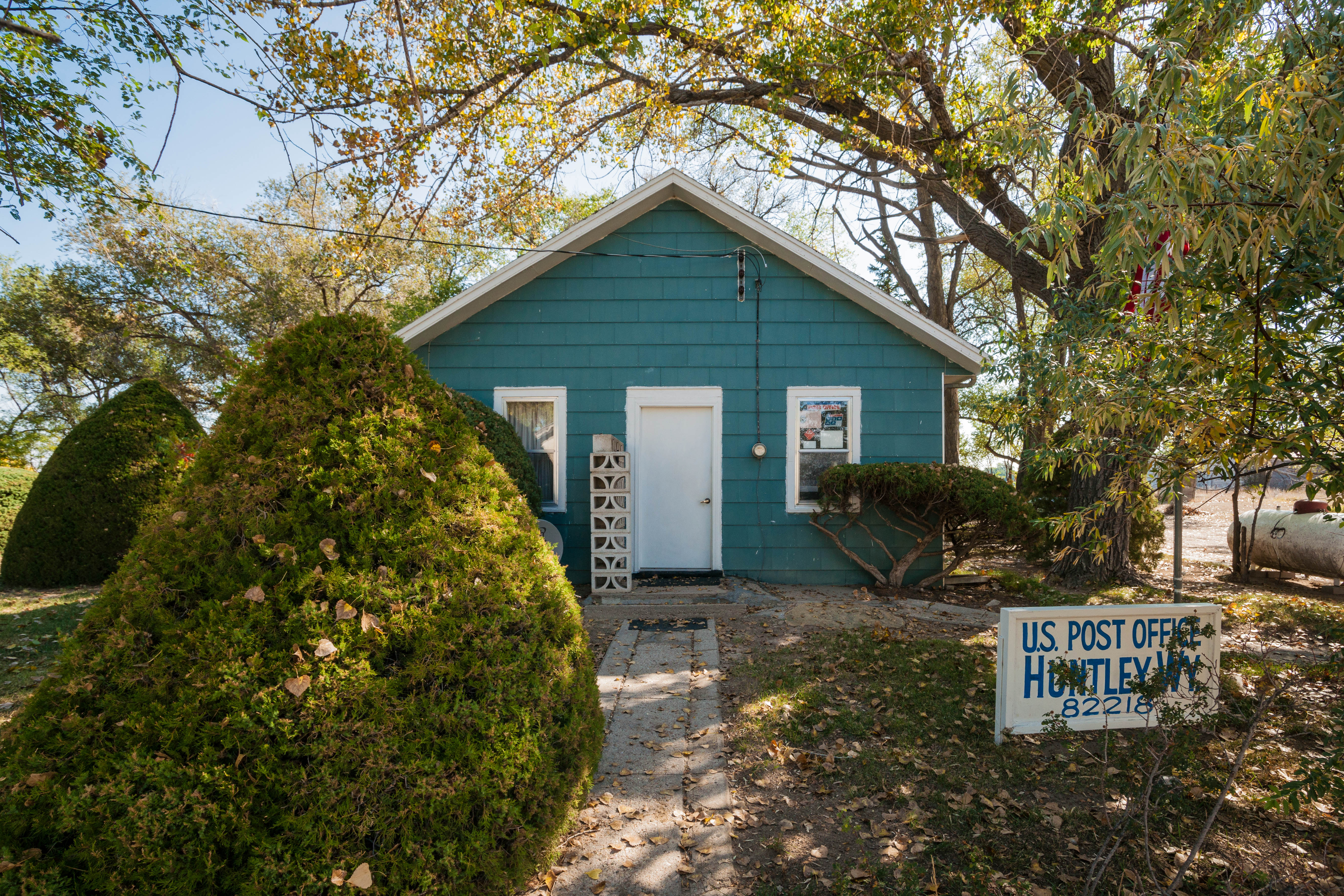
Post office

== History ==
Around 1900, a fund established by the wealthy European philanthropist Baron Maurice de Hirsch to promote farming in the United States, sponsored about 50 families by supporting them in establishing a new community around what is now Huntley, eight miles (13 km) south of the North Platte River, and five miles (8.0 km) west of the Nebraska border.

The new residents came mostly from New York and Pennsylvania, as well as some from Europe. On July 6, 1906, six men from the community first filed claims for 160-acre (65 ha) homesteads located in and around present-day Huntley. Most of the homesteaders and their families started out there living in sod dugouts that they built for use as dwellings.

Among the challenges for the new residents was that the nearest water was about half a mile away in the Katzer Canal, and obtaining needed supplies was difficult, as the closest general store was in Mitchell, Nebraska, about 15 miles (24 km) to the east. Most of the settlers did not originally own horses, and walked to Mitchell to purchase supplies—carrying flour, sugar, beans, rice and salt back to their homesteads in knapsacks. About a year later, however, Baron de Hirsch's fund sent $500, a huge sum in those days, to each family. With this financial support from de Hersch, the settlers were then able to purchase horses, wagons, machinery, a milk cow, and tools. Before long, Huntley had a post office, a church, a grocery store, and a lumber yard.

In 1908, de Hirsch sponsored another 40 or 45 more families coming to Wyoming, who settled in an area a few miles northeast of present-day the Huntley, known as the community of Allen, and a school and a synagogue were established.

== Geography ==
According to the United States Census Bureau, the CDP has a total area of 0.3 square mile (0.7 km^{2}), all land.

== Demographics ==
As of the census of 2000, there were 21 people, 9 households, and 6 families residing in the CDP. The population density was 77.3 people per square mile (30.0/km^{2}). There were 9 housing units at an average density of 33.1/sq mi (12.9/km^{2}). The racial makeup of the CDP was 100.00% White.

Of the 9 households, 33.3% had children under the age of 18 living with them, 66.7% were married couples living together, and 33.3% were non-families. Another 33.3% of all households were made up of individuals, and 11.1% had someone living alone who was 65 years of age or older. The average household size was 2.33 persons, and the average family size was 3.00.

In the CDP, the population consisted of 28.6% under the age of 18, 28.6% from age 25 to 44, 28.6% from age 45 to 64, and 14.3% who were 65 years of age or older. The median age was 34 years. For every 100 females, there were 61.5 males. For every 100 females age 18 and over, there were 87.5 males.

The median income for a household in the CDP was $30,625, and the median income for a family was $30,625. Males had a median income of $13,750 versus $0 for females. The per capita income for the CDP was $9,688. None of the population or families were below the poverty line.

== Education ==
Public education for the community of Huntley is now provided by Goshen County School District #1 in Torrington.

== Infrastructure ==
=== Highways ===
- U.S. Highway 85
- WYO 92
- WYO 158
- WYO 161

== Notable people ==
- Stanley K. Hathaway - 27th Governor of Wyoming, 1967–1975; 40th U.S. Secretary of the Interior, 1975.

== See also ==
- List of census-designated places in Wyoming
