= Centennial Work Center =

- U.S. National Register of Historic Places
- U.S. Historic district
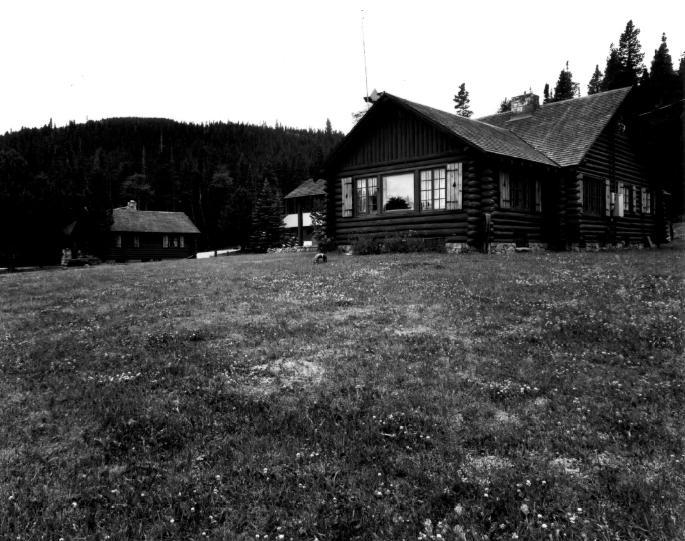
- Centennial Work Center, front of residence and office.

- Location within Wyoming Location within the United States
- Nearest city: Centennial, Wyoming
- Coordinates: 41°18′28″N 106°9′25″W
- Area: 5 acres (2.0 ha)
- Built: 1938
- Architect: USDA Forest Service, Region 2
- Architectural style: USFS rustic architecture
- MPS: Depression-Era USDA Forest Service Administrative Complexes on Medicine Bow NF MPS
- NRHP reference No.: 94000273
- Added to NRHP: April 11, 1994

The Centennial Work Center in Medicine Bow National Forest near Centennial, Wyoming was built in 1938. It was built to replace the nearby Centennial Ranger Station. It was designed by USDA Forest Service, Region 2 in USFS rustic architecture and served as a government office. It was listed on the National Register of Historic Places for its architecture. The listing included three contributing buildings, a bunkhouse, a combined office and bunkhouse, and a garage, on 5 acres (2.0 ha).

The office/bunkhouse and bunkhouse are both of horizontal saddle-notched log construction with wood shingled gable roofs. Both were built in 1938 and 1939. The office contains an office/living room, kitchen, bunk room, small utility room and a basement under the living room and kitchen. It was originally built with an attached two car garage, but this was converted into a bunk room in 1964. The bunkhouse contains a kitchen, three bunk rooms, living room with stone fireplace, dining room, bathroom and a full basement. A brass plaque in front of the bunkhouse memorializes Robert Fechner, who was National Director of the Civilian Conservation Corp (CCC) from 1933 until his death in 1939.

The garage is a rectangular wood-frame building with log siding. It contains two bays, two workrooms, and two small storage rooms. It was built from 1938 to 1940, with a 450 square foot addition to the south end in 1962.

All three contributing structures were built mostly by crews from the Mullen Creek Camp (F-36-W) of the CCC, with some work also being done by Ryan Park Side Camp (F-22-W) crews. The Mullen Creek Camp was at the Centennial Work Center, on the southeast corner along Mullen Creek.

During World War II, the Mullen Creek CCC Camp became the Centennial POW Camp. The Centennial POW Camp opened in July 1945 for German POWs. The Centennial POW Camp was a timber camp. German POWs were paid to work for the Wyoming Timber Company. The workers cut over 2,000,000 feet of timber by mid-November 1945, when the camp closed.

== See also ==
- Ryan Park Camp
