= A.I.R. Gallery =

Art gallery in New York, US

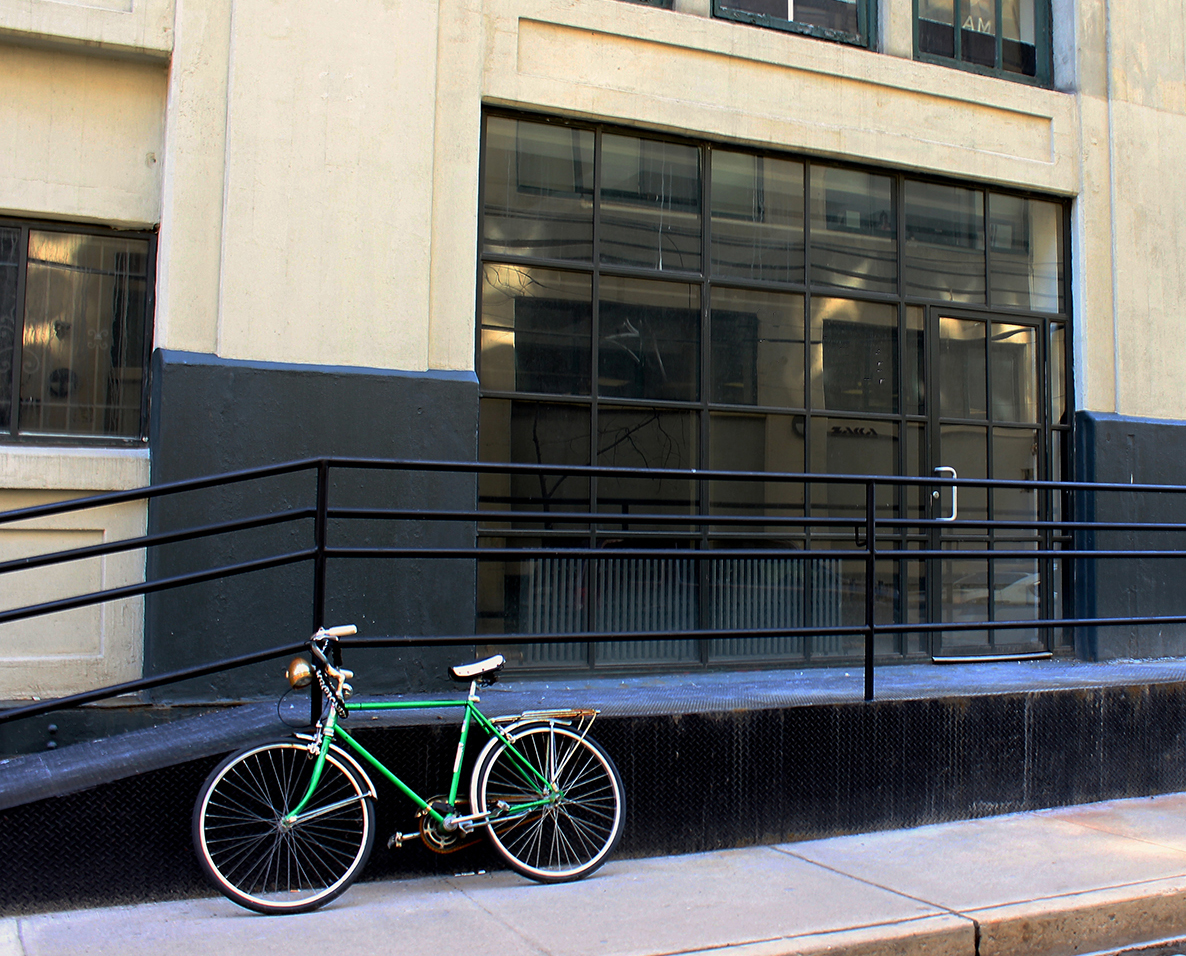
A.I.R. Gallery, 155 Plymouth St, Brooklyn

A.I.R. Gallery (Artists in Residence) is the longest running all female artists cooperative gallery in the United States. It was founded in 1972 with the objective of providing a professional and permanent exhibition space for women artists during a time in which the works shown at commercial galleries in New York City were almost exclusively by male artists. A.I.R. is a not-for-profit, self-underwritten arts organization, with a board of directors made up of its New York based artists. The gallery was originally located in SoHo at 97 Wooster Street, and was located on 111 Front Street in the DUMBO neighborhood of Brooklyn from 2008 until 2015. In May 2015 the gallery moved to its current location in DUMBO at 155 Plymouth Street.

A.I.R. is a non-profit organization that aims to show the diversity and artistic talent of women and non-binary artists, to teach, to challenge stereotypes of female artists, and to subvert the historically male-dominated commercial gallery scene, with the overall hope to serve as an example for other artists who wish to realize their own art cooperative endeavors.

== History ==
Founded in 1972, A.I.R. is the longest running non-profit, artist-run gallery for women in the country. According to art critic Lee Ann Norman "A.I.R. is not the first female-focused collective gallery...[but] perhaps been the most influential, inspiring the creation of several other women-focused, artist-run collective spaces across the country including Womanspace in Los Angeles (1973–1974), Artemisia in Chicago (1973–2003), WARM in Minneapolis (1976–1991), and even SOHO20 in Manhattan (1973 – present), among others."

The announcement for the gallery's first exhibition elaborates its founding concept best, stating, "A.I.R. does not sell art; it changes attitudes about art by women. A.I.R. offers women artists a space to show work as innovative, transitory and free of market trends as the artists' conceptions demands." Based on the feminist principles of economic cooperation and decision by consensus, A.I.R. continues to offer an alternative venue for women that protects the creative process and the individual voice of the artist.

Barbara Zucker and Susan Williams, two artists and friends, confronted the challenges of finding a dealer and decided to look for other women artists to start a co-op. Feminism at that time had barely penetrated the New York Art scene and a 1970 Whitney Museum protest drew attention to the less than 5 percent female representation. Directed by activist art critic Lucy Lippard, the two, together with Dotty Attie and Mary Grigoriadis, visited 55 studios to select and invite women artists to form a co-op.

At the first meeting on March 17, 1972, in Williams' loft, women artists met, among them were Maude Boltz, Linda Vi Vona, Nancy Spero, Louise Bourgeois, Howardena Pindell, Ree Morton, Harmony Hammond, Cynthia Carlson and Sari Dienes. For the artists themselves, their work and exhibition goals were all about quality. Still, having to deal with feminist politics was in the center, which meant fighting prejudices and fears that the showings would be considered second-rate. After the opening, one man said grudgingly, "Okay you did it; you found 20 good women artists. But that's it."

The gallery was structured to be both an exhibition space for art by women and a radical, progressive, and even subversive, not-for-profit institution. Its cooperative nature and its democratic structure have meant that the members vote on all decisions and participate in monthly meetings to plan exhibitions, programs, and the overall direction of the gallery. Each artist pays membership dues and thus has ownership over the organization itself and their own career. In this way, the structure of A.I.R. differs from that of dealer-driven galleries. Incoming artists are chosen through a rigorous peer review process that includes reviewing the works of applicants, lengthy discussions and a studio visit by current members. Each artist has to curate her own show, which allows for experimentation and risks that are not always possible in commercial settings. The group soon acknowledged the importance of building a heritage; collaborations and international group shows, in parts curated by their members, were established. The fellowship program in its earliest years provided sponsorship on a case-by-case basis as funds were available.

The gallery's archive is held at Fales Library at NYU.

== Name ==
The name "A.I.R." arose when, in a first meeting, artist member Howardena Pindell suggested "Jane Eyre". From that came "air" – then, "A.I.R." This was also a reference to the "Artist in Residence" Certification given by the city to allow artists to live in otherwise illegal Soho commercial spaces.

== Programs ==
Monday-Night Program Series 1972–1981; Current Issue Series 1982–1987 (both programs included general-audience panels on criticism, the market, public art as well as "how-tos" – for example 'tax night', and so on); Exhibition Programs: Solo Shows of Gallery Artists; Sponsored Solo Shows for Fellowship Artists; Group Shows of National Artists; Group Shows designed to include a broader community of women artists such as the "Generations" invitational series and juried Biennial Exhibitions; Lectures/Symposia/Panels; Fellowship Program; Internship Program

The Fellowship Program, founded in 1993, is open to women and non-binary artists who have never had a solo show in NYC, or who have not had a solo show in NYC in the last ten years, outside of an educational or not-for-profit venue. The Fellowship Program is structured to give the Fellows the opportunity to develop their work in preparation for a solo show, to build relationships with other artists and arts professionals, and acquire skills necessary to maintain a not-for-profit gallery or arts organization. The Fellows leave the program with a series of naturally forged relationships, experiences, and essential skill sets that are necessary to continue their careers as visual artists.

Fellowship artists include (1993–2021): Tenesh Webber, Diyan Achjadi, Angie Eng, Debra Hampton, Juri Kim, Sheila Manion-Artz, Fay Torres Yap, Elizabeth Zechel, Enid Crow, Christine Gedeon, Marni Horwitz, Fay Ku, Diane Meyer, Jinnine Pak, Hye-Kyung Kim, Jill Parisi, Sarah Blackwelder, Pattie Lee Becker, Soyeon Cho, Betsy Alwin, Megan Biddle, Margarida Correia, Stephanie Lempert, Brynna K. Tucker, Claudia Vieira, Lauren Simkin Berke, Barbara Hatfield, Kharis Kennedy, Katherine Dolgy Ludwig, Anita Ragusa, Hanna Sandin, Nivi Alroy, Monica Carrier, Ari Tabei, Elena Wen, Jennifer Williams, Jennifer Wroblewski, Damali Abrams, Suzanne Broughel, Kira Nam Greene, Jee Hwang, Keun Young Park, Annette Rusin, Jiyoon Koo, Juliana Cerqueira Leite, Meghan Mcinnis, Anne Percoco, Sam Vernon, Elisabeth Waterston, Rachel Farmer, Dina Kantor, Amelia Marzec, Jayanthi Moorthy, Laura Petrovich-Cheney, Susan Stainman, Ian Gerson, Shanti Grumbine, Jessie Henson, Sujin Lee, Hannah Smith Allen, Naho Taruishi, Aimée Burg, Annie Ewaskio, Bang-Geul Han, Einat Imber, Katherine Tzu-Ian Mann, Régine Romain, Željka Blakšić, Amber Esseiva, Sara Mejia Kriendler, Amanda Turner Pohan, Alexandria Smith, Claudia Sohrens, Fanny Allié, Andrea Burgay, Shadi Harouni, Daniela Kostova, Kameelah Janan Rasheed, Negin Sharifzadeh, Manal Abu-Shaheen, Elizabeth Hoy, Eleanor King, Marykate Maher, Alison Owen, Naomi Elena Ramirez, Rachelle Dang, H. A. Halpert, Sareh Imani, Victoria Manganiello, Aliza Shvarts, Crys Yin, Melanie Crean, Isabella Cruz-Chong, Kim Dacres, Macon Reed, Gabriela Vainsencher, Zhiyuan Yang, Aya Rodriguez-Izumi, Caroline Wayne, Daniela Puliti, Dominique Duroseau, Karen Leo, Megan Pahmier, Aika Akhmetova, Destiny Belgrave, Lizania Cruz, Kyoung Eun Kang, Sky Olson, Bat-Ami Rivlin.

== Reception ==
A.I.R. Gallery has played a widely recognized role in the art world since the institution's founding. In 1978, notable feminist painter Sylvia Sleigh commemorated the 21 current members (including Sleigh herself) of A.I.R. through her painting A.I.R. Group Portrait. In the essay "The Enemies of Women's Liberation in the Arts Will be Crushed", Art Historian Meredith Brown praises how A.I.R. "created a wide-ranging network of individuals and organizations that collectively rallied to counter the patriarchy of the art establishment". Art Historian Lenore Malen similarly acknowledges the influence of A.I.R. stating "New York City where I moved in 73 I saw how the women's collectives: A.I.R., Soho 20, and others were shaping the feminist art movement". While many acknowledge the influence of A.I.R. on feminist art, the gallery has received some criticism in its use of government funding. In her article "The Balance Sheet: A.I.R. and Government Funding", Meredith Brown argues that "A.I.R. began to rely on financial support from sources whose bureaucratic complexities necessitated the gallery shift its organizational structure, if not compromise its feminist principles".

== Gallery locations ==
The first, self-renovated location for the inaugural A.I.R. exhibition was 97 Wooster Street, which opened on September 16, 1972. After occupying a gallery space at 63 Crosby Street from 1981 to 1994, A.I.R. Gallery was located at 40 Wooster Street from 1994 to 2002, at 511 West 25th Street from 2002 to 2008 and opened a new space at 111 Front Street # 228, Dumbo - Brooklyn, New York, starting with The History Show on October 2, 2008. In May 2015, A.I.R. Gallery moved to a new location. The current address is 155 Plymouth St, Brooklyn, NY 11201.

== Founding members ==
Dotty Attie, Rachel bas-Cohain, Judith Bernstein, Blythe Bohnen, Maude Boltz, Agnes Denes, Daria Dorosh, Loretta Dunkelman, Mary Grigoriadis, Harmony Hammond, Laurace James, Nancy Kitchell, Louise Kramer, Anne Healy, Rosemary Mayer, Patsy Norvell, Howardena Pindell, Nancy Spero, Susan Williams, Barbara Zucker

== Current members ==
There are five tiers of membership programs for women and non-binary artists at AIR Gallery. The New York Artist membership is open to self-identified women artists residing in the New York area. The National Membership program includes 22 women and non binary artists throughout the United States. Alumnae membership is open to any former New York, National, and Fellowship Artists who wish to remain a part of the gallery. After maintaining 7 years of membership at A.I.R., artists will automatically be eligible for the Adjunct Program.

== Artists ==
Artists whose works have been exhibited at the gallery include:

- Dotty Attie
- Nancy Azara
- Susan Bee
- Judith Bernstein
- Stephanie Bernheim
- Blythe Bohnen
- Ohan Breiding
- Enid Crow
- Rosalyn Drexler
- Mary Beth Edelson
- Jane Gilmor
- Sarah Beth Goncarova
- Judith Henry
- Sue Hettmansperger
- Jungil Hong
- Janice Kluge
- Marcia Kure
- Ellen McMahon
- Ana Mendieta
- Ann Schaumburger
- Dolgor Ser-Od
- Erin Siegal
- Yvonne Shortt
- Elke Solomon
- Nancy Spero
- Nancy Wilson-Pajic
- Janise Yntema
- Sylvia Sleigh
