= Howardena Pindell =

American painter

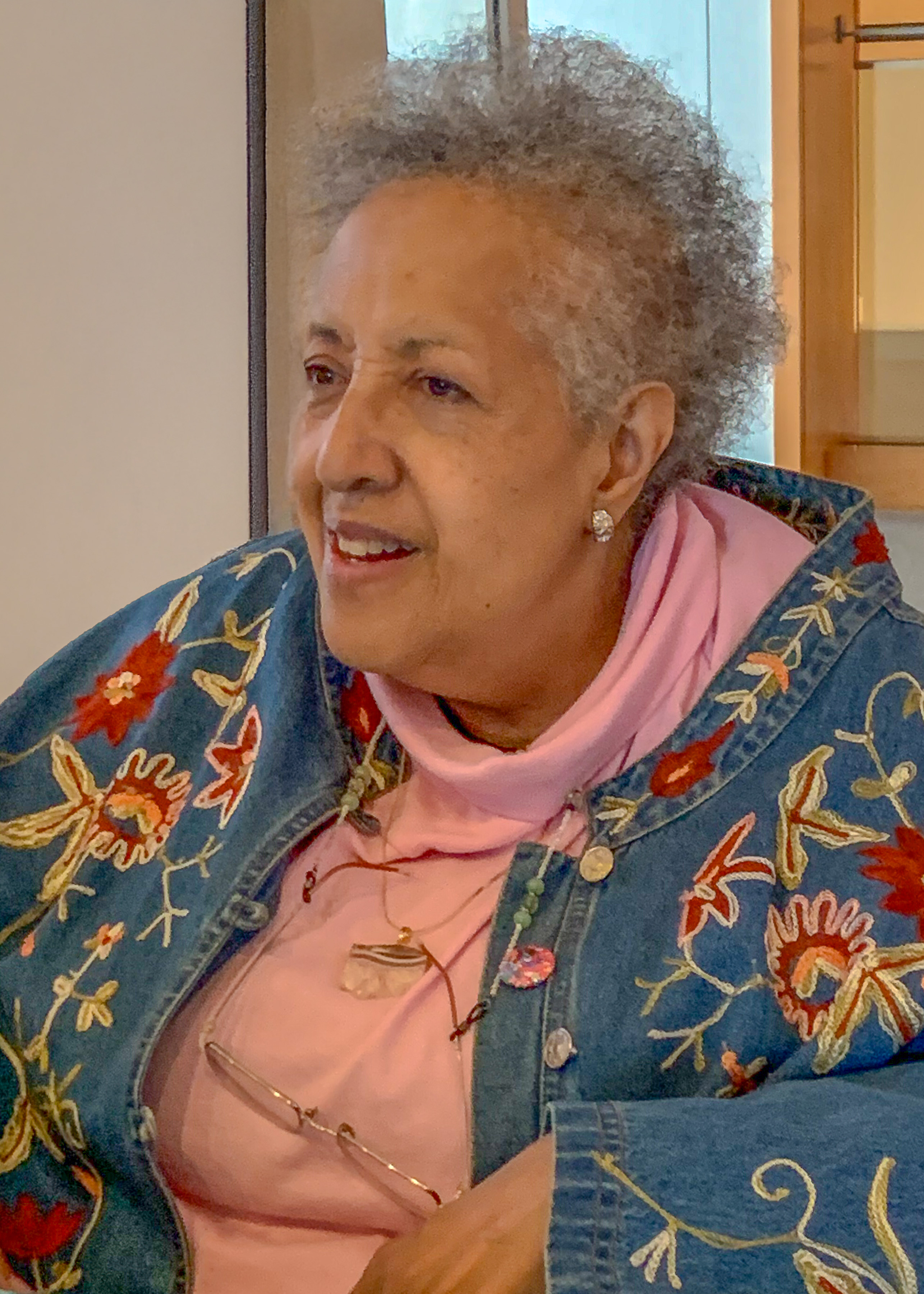
- Pindell in 2019
- Born: April 14, 1943 (age 83); Philadelphia, Pennsylvania, U.S.
- Education: Boston University, Yale School of Art and Architecture
- Occupations: Artist, curator, educator
- Known for: Painting, collage, video art, mixed media
- Awards: Guggenheim Fellowship (1987)

Howardena Pindell (born April 14, 1943) is an American artist, curator, critic, and educator. She is known as a painter and mixed media artist who uses a wide variety of techniques and materials. She began her long arts career working with the New York Museum of Modern Art, while making work at night. She co-founded the A.I.R. Gallery and worked with other groups to advocate for herself and other female artists, Black women in particular. Her work explores texture, color, structures, and the process of making art; it is often political, addressing the intersecting issues of racism, feminism, violence, slavery, and exploitation. She has created abstract paintings, collages, "video drawings," and "process art" and has exhibited around the world.

== Early life and education ==
Howardena Pindell was born on April 14, 1943, in Philadelphia, Pennsylvania, and was raised in the neighborhood of Germantown. Her parents were Mildred (née Lewis) and Howard Douglas Pindell; she was an only child. She graduated from the Philadelphia High School for Girls, where she acted and designed scenes for the school's stage play. From a young age, she demonstrated promise in figurative art classes at the Philadelphia College of Art, the Fleisher Art Memorial, and the Tyler School of Art.

She received her BFA degree in 1965 from Boston University, and her MFA degree in 1967 from Yale University. Pindell had studied color theory under Sewell Sillman.

== Career ==
In 1967, Pindell began working in the Arts Education Department at the Museum of Modern Art (MoMA) in New York City. In 1969, Pindell gained recognition for her participation in the exhibition American Drawing Biennial XXIII at the Norfolk Museum of Arts and Sciences, and by 1972, had her first major exhibition at Spelman College in Atlanta. By 1977, she assumed a curatorial position in the Department of Prints and Illustrated Books at MoMA. As MoMA's associate curator, Pindell would spend nights creating her own pieces, drawing inspiration from many of the exhibits hosted at the museum (especially Akan batakari tunics of the museum's African Textiles and Decorative Arts exhibit). She concluded her professional experience with the MoMA, by 1979.

In 1972, Pindell co-founded the A.I.R. Gallery, which was the first artist-directed gallery for women artists in the United States. There were twenty artist cofounders, including Nancy Spero, Agnes Denes, Barbara Zucker, Dotty Attie, Judith Bernstein, Harmony Hammond, Mary Grigoriadis, Maude Boltz, Louise Kramer, and others. Pindell was the only Black woman co-founder. At the first meeting, held on March 17, 1972, Pindell suggested naming the gallery the "Eyre Gallery" after the novel Jane Eyre by Charlotte Brontë. The artists ultimately chose the name "A.I.R. Gallery", the initials standing for "Artists in Residence". The gallery allowed women artists to curate their own exhibitions, giving them the choice to take risks with their work, which contrasted with the practices of commercial galleries. However, when Pindell raised issues of racial exclusion in A.I.R. meetings, she found her colleagues indifferent at best, hostile at worst. Her experiences with A.I.R. were a major influence on her video work Free, White, and 21. She left the A.I.R. Gallery in 1975.

In the mid-1970s, she traveled abroad as a guest speaker and lecturer. Her seminars included "Current American and Black American Art: A Historical Survey" at the Madras College of Arts and Crafts in India, in 1975, and "Black Artists, U.S.A." at the Academy of Art in Oslo, Norway, in 1976.

Pindell is currently a professor of art at Stony Brook University, where she has taught since 1979. In the 1980s, Pindell was the victim of a hate crime at Stony Brook, where she found her office door covered in black paint. Upon filing a complaint, she reported that no action was taken by the University. She was also visiting professor in the Art department of Yale University, from 1995 to 1999.

In 2010, Pindell was interviewed for the film !Women Art Revolution (2010).

In 2024, White Cube sold Pindell's "Untitled, 1975" for $1.75 million at Art Basel Paris. From November 20, 2024, to January 8, 2025, White Cube Hong Kong will host a one-person show of Pindell's new paintings.

== Art criticism and critiques of the art world ==
Pindell is notable for releasing several articles criticizing diversity of representation within the visual art industry. In 1978, she commented on her travels throughout Nigeria in 1973, to where she witnessed a gendered divide between artists. She argued that the lack of female artists was a product of economic and cultural pressures that make female artistic presence a rarity in the nation. In 1988, Pindell documented the racial makeup of artist representations in New York City. She noted that at most 12% of artists (in both the private and public sector) were nonwhite during the 1986/1987 New York City exhibition season.

While working at MoMA, Pindell created a statistical report, featured in the March 1989 issue of ARTnews. This report spanned seven years, where she surveyed art institutions and galleries in New York State that featured Black, Asian, Hispanic, and Native American artists and designers. In her findings, she reported that out of 64 of the surveyed institutions and galleries, 54 showcased white artists at a baseline of 90%. A year later, Pindell elaborated on her findings, criticizing practices of censorship that disenfranchised Black artists under the guise of elitism- highlighting de facto practices that simultaneously eliminated and tokenized the presence of Black artists in museums.

In January 2020, Pindell filed a lawsuit against the G. R. N’Namdi Gallery. The lawsuit sought the return of more than 20 artworks, with Pindell alleging untimely payments and nondisclosed information about artwork purchases during nine solo shows at N'Namdi Galleries- between 1987 and 2006. Pindell has cited discrimination against Black artists as a contributing factor to fiduciary manipulation, joining Al Herbert and Herbert Gentry as a group of artists who have expressed difficulties working with the N'Namdi family.

== Artistic style ==
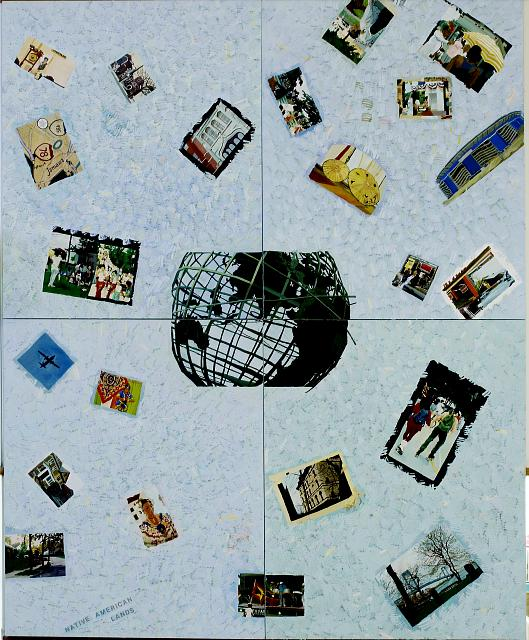
Pindell's 1989 painting Queens, Festival, in the lobby of the Joseph P. Addabbo Federal Building, Queens, New York. The work is acrylic, paper, and gouache on canvas.

Following her graduation from the MFA program specializing in painting at Yale University in 1967, Pindell moved to New York City. In New York, she began to work with abstraction and collaging, finding inspiration in the work of fellow grad school student Nancy Silvia Murata. By the 1970s, she began developing a unique style, rooted in the use of dots and reminiscent of minimalism and pointillism. From working with dots, Pindell began making use of the scrap circles of oak tag paper that resulted from the production of her pointillist works. David Bourdon writes: "By 1974, Pindell developed a more three-dimensional and more personal form of pointillism, wielding a paper punch to cut out multitudes of confetti-like disks, which she dispersed with varying degrees of premeditation and randomness over the surfaces of her pictures." One example of this is a 17 x 90 inch, untitled drawing-collage from 1973; Pindell used more than 20 thousand hand-numbered paper dots to form vertical and horizontal rows with rhythmic peacefulness, uniting order and chaos.

In 1973, her work with circles received acclaim at a show in the A.I.R. Gallery in SoHo, where her style had solidified into expression through "large-scale, untitled, nonrepresentational, abstract paintings". The late 1940s to early 1950s were muses, as Pindell drew inspiration from a root beer bottle she remembered from a childhood trip while with her parents in Ohio. The bottom of the mug had a big red circle on it, a mark once placed on dishes and silverware used to serve people of color in the racially segregated United States so that their utensils and serving ware could be distinguished from those for "Whites only." Because of this, Pindell experienced the circle as "a scary thing" and the shape preoccupied her as an artist. Experimenting with circles in pieces such as Untitled #3C actually enabled her to repair her relationship with the shape, as she told the New York Times: “I get great pleasure out of punching holes.”

Pindell also began work on her "Video Drawings" series in 1983. At the advice of her doctor, Pindell bought a television for her studio to encourage her from working long hours on her dot works. She became interested in the artificial light from her television monitor, and began to write out small numerals on acetate, which she stuck to the TV screen. She then photographed her drawings placed over the monitor. These experiments led to a long series of works that featured her drawings over sporting events and news broadcastings, including televised elections.

The spray paintings of the early 1970s, which made use of the scrap pieces of paper from which holes had been punched, were dark and smoldering, yet there was also a shimmering light. This appearance of light would carry on as Pindell began building up the punched out dots on the canvas, sometimes even sprinkling glitter across the surface, too. These canvases were rich visual feasts of color and light.

In these years, Pindell described feeling great influence in her work from the Black Power and feminist movements, as well as from exposure to new art forms during her day job at MoMA and her travels abroad (particularly to Africa). She became fascinated by African sculpture exhibited at MoMA and in the Brooklyn Museum of Art, and began to mirror the practice of encoding and accumulation in her own work. The material of these pieces also informed Pindell's work: while African art embraces the use of objects in sculpture such as beads, horns, shells, hair, and claws, so Pindell's collages began to incorporate additional elements including paper, glitter, acrylic, and dye.

By the 1980s, Pindell was also working on unstretched canvas. A few large-scale works have a similar effect of looking totally white from a distance but actually being made up of tiny dots of colored paper, sequins, and paint. Pindell likened this experience of viewing her paintings to whitewashing her own identity to make it more palatable for the art world. However, she was met with criticism because this work was not overtly political in appearance. At this time, she also began combining the ideas of the video drawings and the hole-punched works; she started adding numbers to each individual hole punch and arranging them in extremely neat rows.

In 1979, Pindell was in a traumatic car accident, from which she suffered severe memory loss. It was at this point that her work became much more autobiographical, in part as an effort to help herself heal. Her painting Autobiography (which was part of an eight-painting series on her recovery), used Pindell's own body as the focal point. For this piece, she cut and sewed a traced outline of herself onto a large piece of canvas as part of a complex collage. She also started collaging postcards from friends and from her own travels into her work. She would often cut the postcards into angular strips and paste them an inch or so apart, leaving room to paint between the strips. The repetition of forms created a vibrating, fractured feel. Her reason for using postcards was to spark her memory that had been affected in the car accident.

In 1980, she made a video called Free, White, and 21, in which she appears in a blonde wig, dark glasses, and with a pale stocking over her head, appearing as a caricature of a white woman. "You really must be paranoid," Pindell says, performing as the white woman, "I have never had experiences like that. But, of course, I am free, white and 21." Pindell engages in a satirical critique, discussing instances of racism that she has experienced throughout her life. She asserted that the "white feminist who wishes equality for herself too often remains a racist in her 'equality.'" From this vantage point, Pindell began expending a particular focus on racism in the art world, a subject on which she has published multiple writings. In 1980, she openly addressed the persistent presence of racism within the feminist movement, organizing a show at the A.I.R. Gallery titled The Dialectics of Isolation: An Exhibition of Third World Women Artists of the US. She became increasingly aware that she had often been selected for exhibition as a token black among a group of other artists. She and Carolyn Martin cofounded a cross-generational black women's artist collective called Entitled: Black Women Artists that has since grown to international membership, likely due to Pindell's consistent travel and lecturing. Over the years, she has visited five continents and lived in Japan, Sweden, and India for periods of time, all the while producing new work and lecturing/writing on racism and the art community.

Throughout the 1980s, she continued to work with expressions of identity through her painting, particularly on her own negotiation of multiple identities, as her heritage includes African, European, Seminole, Central American, and Afro-Caribbean roots, along with her position as ethnically Jewish, raised Christian. During this time, her pieces also became increasingly political, addressing women's issues, racism, child abuse, slavery, and AIDS. According to Pindell, among critics of this new work, "There was a nostalgia for my non-issue related work of the 1970s."

In the 1990s, Pindell displayed a series of memorial works and a sequence of "word" paintings, in which her body in silhouette is overlaid with words such as "slave trade." This later series is reminiscent of an earlier work about South Africa that features a slashed canvas roughly stitched back together and the word "INTERROGATION" laid on top.

Aside from her writing, Pindell's work has been recognized in an emerging conversation of Black abstract artistry. In 2021, she was compared to Jack Whitten, Sam Gilliam, and Charles Gaines as part of an experimental wave of Black artists originating from late 20th century.

Pindell's work was included in the 2021 exhibition Women in Abstraction at the Centre Pompidou. Her work was included in the 2024 exhibition Making Their Mark: Works from the Shah Garg Collection at the Berkeley Art Museum and Pacific Film Archive (BAMPFA).

== Awards ==
Pindell has received a Guggenheim Fellowship in painting in 1987, the Most Distinguished Body of Work or Performance Award, granted by the College Art Association in 1990, the Studio Museum of Harlem Artist Award, the Distinguished Contribution to the Profession Award from the Women's Caucus for Art in 1996, two National Endowment for the Arts Fellowships and a United States Artists fellowship in 2020.

She also holds honorary doctorates from the Massachusetts College of Art and Design and Parsons The New School for Design.

== Collections ==
- Buffalo AKG Art Museum, Buffalo, New York
- Brooklyn Museum, Brooklyn, New York
- Corcoran Gallery of Art, Washington, D.C.
- Fogg Art Museum, Harvard University.
- Heckscher Museum of Art, Huntington, New York
- High Museum of Art, Atlanta, Georgia
- Institute of Contemporary Art Boston, Boston, Massachusetts
- Kemper Art Museum, Washington University in St. Louis.
- Louisiana Museum of Modern Art, Copenhagen, Denmark
- Metropolitan Museum of Art, New York City
- Mint Museum of Art, Charlotte, North Carolina
- Museum of Contemporary Art, Chicago, Illinois
- Museum of Fine Arts, Boston, Boston, Massachusetts
- Museum of Fine Arts, Houston, Houston, Texas
- Museum of Modern Art, New York City
- National Academy Museum, New York
- National Gallery of Art, Washington, D.C.
- Pennsylvania Academy of the Fine Arts, Philadelphia, Pennsylvania
- Pérez Art Museum Miami, Florida
- Philadelphia Museum of Art, Philadelphia, Pennsylvania
- Smithsonian Museum of American Art, Washington, D.C.
- The Studio Museum in Harlem, New York City
- Virginia Museum of Fine Arts, Richmond, Virginia
- Wadsworth Atheneum, Hartford, Connecticut
- Walker Art Center, Minneapolis, Minnesota
- Whitney Museum of American Art, New York City
- Yale University Art Gallery, New Haven, Connecticut
- Zimmerli Art Museum, Rutgers, The State University of New Jersey, New Brunswick.
