= Nancy Cohen =

American visual artist

Nancy M. Cohen
- Born: Queens, New York, United States
- Education: Columbia University; Rochester Institute of Technology
- Known for: Sculpture, papermaking, drawing, installation
- Spouse: Cullen Schaffer
- Awards: Pollock-Krasner Foundation; New York Foundation for the Arts
- Website: nancymcohen.com

Nancy Cohen, Estuary: Moods & Modes, (detail of wall component), handmade paper, wire and salt, 376" x 132" x 96", 2007.

Nancy M. Cohen is an American visual artist. Her art often defies categorization, merging forms such as drawing, tapestry, sculpture and installation, and moving between abstraction and reference to the body and natural environment. She typically works with handmade paper and glass and repurposed objects, materials that underscore qualities such as fragility, liminality, transparency, tactility and provisionality. Since 2007, she has focused on abstracted interpretations of water ecologies affected by human development. This work balances celebration and critique, finding beauty amid destruction as it conveys the dissonance between the constancy of nature and a virulent built environment. Sculpture critic Jonathan Goodman writes, Cohen's "forms—drawings of glass and wire— offer spectacular visions of what art can be when taken from the ruins of nature. There is a vulnerability to [her] work that moves it from the descriptive to a lyrical consideration of loss, though survival always remains a possibility."

Cohen has been awarded fellowships, grants and residencies from organizations including the Pollock-Krasner Foundation, New York Foundation for the Arts, Brodsky Center, Corning Museum of Glass and MacDowell. Her work belongs to the collections of institutions including the Asheville Art Museum, Bergstrom-Mahler Museum of Glass, Memphis Brooks Museum of Art, and Montclair Art Museum. She has exhibited at those museums as well as at the SculptureCenter, The Textile Museum and Newark Museum of Art, among other venues.

Cohen is based in Jersey City, New Jersey.

== Life and career ==
Cohen was born in Queens, New York and grew up along Long Island Sound. Her lifelong experience on the periphery of water in New York and industrial New Jersey has been a key inspiration in her work. By high school, she developed an interest in art and apprenticed with ceramic artist and painter Marylyn Dintenfass. She majored in ceramics at the Rochester Institute of Technology (BFA, 1981), eventually turning her focus to sculpture at Columbia University. After earning an MFA there in 1984, she studied with sculptor Barbara Zucker at the Skowhegan School of Painting and Sculpture. After graduating, Cohen taught at the National Academy of Design, Parsons School of Design and Pratt Institute, and later, at Queens College from 2004 until her retirement in 2023.

Cohen's early sculptures and wall assemblages consisted of found objects blended with mixed materials that reviews described as fleshy and visceral. She exhibited this work in group shows at the alternative spaces Art in General, A.I.R. Gallery and White Columns and at the Jersey City Museum between 1986 and 1994. During this period, she also produced larger works and outdoor installations, for venues such as the Socrates Sculpture Park, after learning welding through a Pollock-Krasner grant. Following a 1992 residency at Dieu Donné, she turned to papermaking, a medium notable for its malleability and translucence. She received broader critical attention for this work, through reviews of solo exhibitions at Kouros Gallery (1998, 2004) and Snug Harbor (1996), among others.

In the 2000s, Cohen has had solo shows and installations at the Noyes Museum, Katonah Museum of Art, UrbanGlass, Bergstrom-Mahler Museum of Glass, and Accola Griefen and Kathryn Markel galleries in New York, among others. She appeared in surveys of paper and fiber art at institutions including the Milwaukee Art Museum, The Textile Museum and CODA Museum (Netherlands), and of glass work at the Kentucky Museum of Art and Craft and Frederik Meijer Gardens & Sculpture Park. She has also produced a number of collaborative projects, with artists, papermakers and environmentalists. Among them are several with Anna Boothe, including the glass installation Between Seeing and Knowing (2013/2017), and Sensation: Interior View (2006), a sculptural collaboration with molecular biologist Shirley Tilghman.

== Work and reception ==
Critics identify sensations of transition and transformation as central to Cohen's work. These qualities are a product of her experimentation with materials (translucent paper, glass, wire) and forms that foster tensions between frailty and resilience, transparency and opacity, interior and exterior, the organic and architectonic, the arbitrary and planned, and gravity, weight and balance. Curator Mary Birmingham notes, Cohen's "materials physically embody the same qualities she finds in nature and people—fragility and strength. She has worked with glass and handmade paper, attracted by their translucency and ability to be structure and surface simultaneously. There is an inherent tension in their potential breakability that makes them effective metaphors for both the fragile ecosystem and the aging body." Cohen has been influenced by sculptors including Louise Bourgeois, Alberto Giacometti and Nancy Graves.

Nancy Cohen, Gurney, glass, rubber, sand, cement and lace, 28" x 60" x 16", 2002.

=== Sculpture and public art, 1990–2004 ===
Cohen's work in the 1990s featured abstract, organic forms made of steel, cloth, adobe, rope, wood, wax and found objects that suggested pods or cellular configurations. Her outdoor installation, A Community of Shelter (Thomas Paine Park, 1992) consisted of six low, sculptures supported by steel armatures tied to trees. New York Times critic Michael Kimmelman compared them to the abstractions of Martin Puryear or Richard Deacon and natural forms of shelter, adding that their evocative shapes "sympathetically and obliquely referred to the homeless and their ingenuity in creating makeshift places to sleep." For Only Connect (Snug Harbor, 1998), a public installation in a botanical garden greenhouse, Cohen suspended "cocoons" of translucent Abacá paper stretched over foliage-filled branches, garden implements and steel that suggested ghostly but aggressive outgrowths of the hothouse plants below.

In exhibitions at Kouros Gallery (1998, 2004), Cohen presented enigmatic found-object and assemblage works (e.g., Gurney, 2002). The earlier show evoked feminine themes, using domestic items (silverware, kitchen utensils, broken glassware) that were partially concealed by taut Abacá ovals evoking protective sheaths and wombs (e.g., Distention, 1998). New Art Examiner reviewer Rachel Selekman observed "strength of form and fragility of means imbue Cohen's sculpture with a presence of gritty elegance that breathes with life." The scavenged-object sculptures in the latter show were compared to biomorphic combinations encountered along an urban beach offering "a tenuous balance of whimsy and thoughtfulness."

=== Works on paper, sculpture and installations, 2005–present ===
Beginning in the latter 2000s, Cohen shifted to handmade paper works, multi-part installations and glass sculptures inspired by the shifting marsh ecology of the New Jersey/New York river system. Her exhibition "Water Ways" (Noyes Museum, 2008) was anchored by her most ambitious work up to that point, Estuary: Moods and Modes. An imposing, undulating installation of layered, handmade and hand-colored Abacá pulp—some stretched like parchment skins over wire armatures—it referenced a biotic ecosystem of the Mullica River that she had observed for months. Sculpture critic Dominique Nahas described the work as simultaneously bas-relief, walk-around sculpture, installation and diagrammatic drawing in space, with "delicately colored, nearly translucent, swirling and trailing papers evoking the fragile balance and power of nature," various flows, and shifting topography and weather.

Nancy Cohen, Blue Storm of our Anxieties, paper pulp and handmade paper, 70" x 81", 2020.

In the traveling installation Hackensack Dreaming (2013–15) and her "Marsh Drawings" (2016), Cohen evoked the persevering "novel ecosystems" that arose at the confluence of built environments and a wetlands section of the Hackensack River that was once a cedar forest. The installation consisted of two large sections divided by a narrow passage that combined drawings and glass objects, organic and plant designs, and facsimiles of surviving cedar stumps, all unified by a blue color palette. Critics dubbed the work an inner landscape of "controlled anarchy" conveying both the toxicity of human impact and a sense of hard-won beauty. Cohen's expansive, three-dimensional paper-fiber murals, such as Marsh Drawing (roundabout) (2016), recall woven tapestries in their drape, scale, physicality and tableaux-like function and echo mutations of riverscapes in their wet formative processes.

In exhibitions between 2017 and 2024, Cohen continued to explore water-related transformation and fluidity, while expanding to themes involving the ephemerality of memory and life, human struggle and survival, particularly during the COVID-19 era. These shows were often split between two bodies of work—freestanding or suspended organic sculptures made from pieces of glass and paper tapestries whose use of translucent materials, line and form blurred distinctions between internal and external, skin and structure, and delicacy and durability.

The exhibition "Atlas of Impermanence" (Visual Art Center of New Jersey (2021) centered on nine monumental paper tapestries whose grids of rectilinear sheets recalled quilts, maps or landscapes seen from above. Covered with abstract shapes and lines, their surfaces alluded to places and objects in the material world ranging from the personal sheltering spaces of the pandemic (e.g., Blue Storm of Our Anxieties) to climate- or catastrophe-stricken rivers and landscapes (e.g., Beneath the Surface, Fire Season). Curator Jennifer Scanlan called the tapestries "a glimpse into the ways that place is constructed in our minds—as a series of visual impressions, but also moods, textures, sensations, and echoes of earlier spaces. Beautifully and evocatively constructed out of texture, color, and light, the works function as maps for us to follow into our own memories." The show "The State We're In" (Kathryn Markel, 2024) included freestanding amalgamations of glass and wire that Mario Naves deemed tactile, unassuming, deeply felt and interior in effect, "with a counterintuitive sensitivity of flesh."

== Recognition ==
Cohen has received fellowships and grants from the Pollock-Krasner Foundation, New Jersey State Council on the Arts, Brodsky Center, Puffin Foundation and Jersey City Arts & Culture Trust Fund. In 2022, she received the Murray Reich Distinguished Artist Award from the New York Foundation for the Arts. She has been an artist-in-residence at MacDowell, Millay Arts, Tides Institute and Museum of Art, Women's Studio Workshop and Yaddo, as well as materials-oriented institutions such as the Archie Bray Foundation for the Ceramic Arts, Bullseye Glass, Dieu Donné, Pilchuck Glass School, Pyramid Atlantic Art Center, and WheatonArts, among others.

Her work belongs to the public art collections of the Asheville Art Museum, Bergstrom-Mahler Museum of Glass, Hunter Museum of American Art, Hunterdon Museum of Art, Memphis Brooks Museum of Art, New Jersey State Museum, Montclair Art Museum, Noyes Museum of Art, Smith College Museum of Art, Weatherspoon Art Museum, Yale University Art Gallery, and Zimmerli Museum, among others.
