= Jane Gilmor =

American sculptor and performance and social practice artist

- Born: June 23, 1947 (age 78); Ames, Iowa, U.S.
- Education: Iowa State University (B.S.); University of Iowa (M.A., M.F.A.)
- Known for: Intermedia, Installation art, Social practice
- Movement: Feminist art, Performance art
- Awards: National Endowment for the Arts Fellowship (1986); Tanne Foundation Award (2011); Fulbright Senior Scholar (2003)
- Website: janegilmor.com

Jane Gilmor (born June 23, 1947) is an American intermedia artist and educator known for her work in performance art, installation art, and social practice. She is associated with the "Iowa School" of experimental art that emerged from the University of Iowa's Intermedia Program under Hans Breder in the 1970s. Gilmor is a Professor Emeritus at Mount Mercy University.

Her work is characterized by the use of embossed metal foil, found objects, and humor to critique social structures, particularly regarding women, labor, and migration. She has been an affiliated member of A.I.R. Gallery in New York City since 1985.

== Biography ==
Gilmor was born in Ames, Iowa. She attended Iowa State University, graduating with a Bachelor of Science in Textile Design in 1969. She subsequently attended the School of the Art Institute of Chicago (SAIC) before returning to Iowa to earn a Master of Arts in Teaching (1973) and a Master of Fine Arts (1977) from the University of Iowa.

Her role in the 1970s feminist art movement is documented in the biographical dictionary Feminists Who Changed America, 1963–1975, which describes her as a "leader in the women’s art movement of the 1970s in the Midwest and nationally." As a graduate student, she traveled to the Woman's Building in Los Angeles to exhibit video work and to New York City to organize exhibitions centered on goddess imagery.

At the University of Iowa, Gilmor was a student of Hans Breder in the Intermedia Program. During this time, she was a peer of Ana Mendieta. While both artists utilized body-centric performance and goddess iconography, art historian Joy Sperling notes that Gilmor distinguished her work by incorporating satire and humor into these themes. Gilmor's contributions to this era are further noted in the seminal survey The Power of Feminist Art.

Gilmor began her teaching career at Mount Mercy University (then Mount Mercy College) in 1973, where she introduced the institution's first women's studies courses, including "Women's Art History" and "Art, Gender and Politics." She served as a Professor of Art until her retirement in 2012.

== Work ==
=== Early performance and personas ===
In the 1970s, Gilmor developed performance works that critiqued female stereotypes and consumer culture. Her most significant early work was the All-American Glamour Kitty Pageant (1976). Gilmor entered her own cat, "Kitty Glitter," into the commercial competition as an embedded performance, documenting the event to create satirical video and installation works. Artifacts from this project, including the "Official Score Card," were later archived and featured in Cabinet magazine.

Following this, she developed the personas "Kitty Glitter" and "Erma." She performed as these characters at archaeological sites in Greece and Egypt, producing a series of "photo tableaux" titled Great Goddesses (1977–1981). These works juxtaposed ancient ruins with domestic or absurdist costuming to comment on the mythology of the feminine, a practice cited by art historian Lucy Lippard in her survey of the era, Overlay.

=== Installations and materiality ===
In the 1980s and 1990s, Gilmor began using industrial aluminum foil and metal repoussé as a primary medium, covering furniture, rooms, and architectural elements in embossed metal skins. This technique was noted by art historian Joy Sperling as a method of "satirizing the search for meaning" while creating "shrines to the ordinary." Major installations from this period include Beds (1994) and Windows (1995), the latter created for the University of Iowa Hospitals and Clinics.

=== Social practice ===
Since the 1980s, Gilmor’s practice has focused on community-based collaboration (social practice). She conducts workshops where participants—often from marginalized groups such as the homeless, immigrants, or factory workers—create embossed metal tiles or share oral histories which are incorporated into large-scale installations.

- Un(Seen) Work (2010): Commissioned by the Faulconer Gallery at Grinnell College, this project involved collaboration with local industrial and service workers to document the "invisible" labor force of the Midwest.
- Bed/Shoe/Home (2017): A project focused on housing insecurity in Champaign-Urbana, Illinois, created while she was a Miller Endowed Scholar at the University of Illinois.

== Exhibitions and collections ==
Gilmor's work has been exhibited extensively in the United States and internationally. She has been an affiliated member of A.I.R. Gallery in New York since 1985.

=== Select exhibitions ===
- Breakfast on Pluto, Figge Art Museum, Davenport, IA (2022).
- Bed/Shoe/Home, University of Illinois at Urbana-Champaign (2017).
- Cooperative Consciousness, Kochi-Muziris Biennale, Kerala, India (2016).
- Un(Seen) Work, Faulconer Gallery, Grinnell College, Grinnell, IA (2010).
- Great Goddesses: Sculpture and Photo Tableaux, Real Art Ways, Hartford, CT (1988).
- Young Americans, Solomon R. Guggenheim Museum, New York, NY (1980).

=== Collections ===
Her work is held in numerous permanent collections, including:

- Museum of Contemporary Art, Chicago
- Des Moines Art Center
- Figge Art Museum

== Awards ==
- National Endowment for the Arts (NEA) Visual Artist Fellowships (1986).
- MacDowell Fellowship (1988).
- McKnight Foundation Interdisciplinary Fellowship (1996–1997).
- Tanne Foundation Award (2011).
- Fulbright Senior Scholar, University of Évora, Portugal (2003).
