= Stephanie Bernheim =

American artist

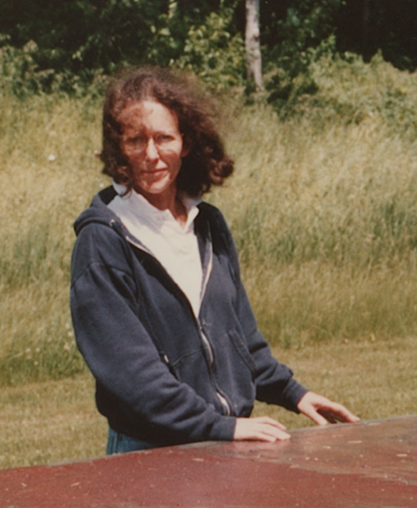
- Making Reliefs on Glass
- Born: Stephanie Hammerschlag; New York, New York
- Website: stephaniebernheim.com

Stephanie Bernheim is an American artist known mainly for her early Wall Reliefs, process paintings and Palmpics. She was a member of A.I.R. Gallery and founded the A.I.R. Fellowship Program in 1993. Bernheim lives and works in New York City.

== Early life and education ==
Bernheim was born in New York, NY. She studied art and art history at Sarah Lawrence College, Bronxville, NY where received a B.A. degree and New York University, New York, NY, where she studied with Milton Resnick and Ad Reinhardt and received an M.A. degree.

== Career ==
In 1991, Stephanie Bernheim and Elizabeth Munro Smith organized, “Who Cares About Feminism?: Art and Politics in the Nineties” with participants: Eleanor Munro, moderator and panelists: Maren Hassinger, Joyce Kozloff, Grace Stanislaus and Barbara Zucker. In 2017, there was a book published on Bernheim's work: Stephanie Bernheim: From Paint to Pixels with essay by Kara L. Rooney and short text by Richard Milazzo.

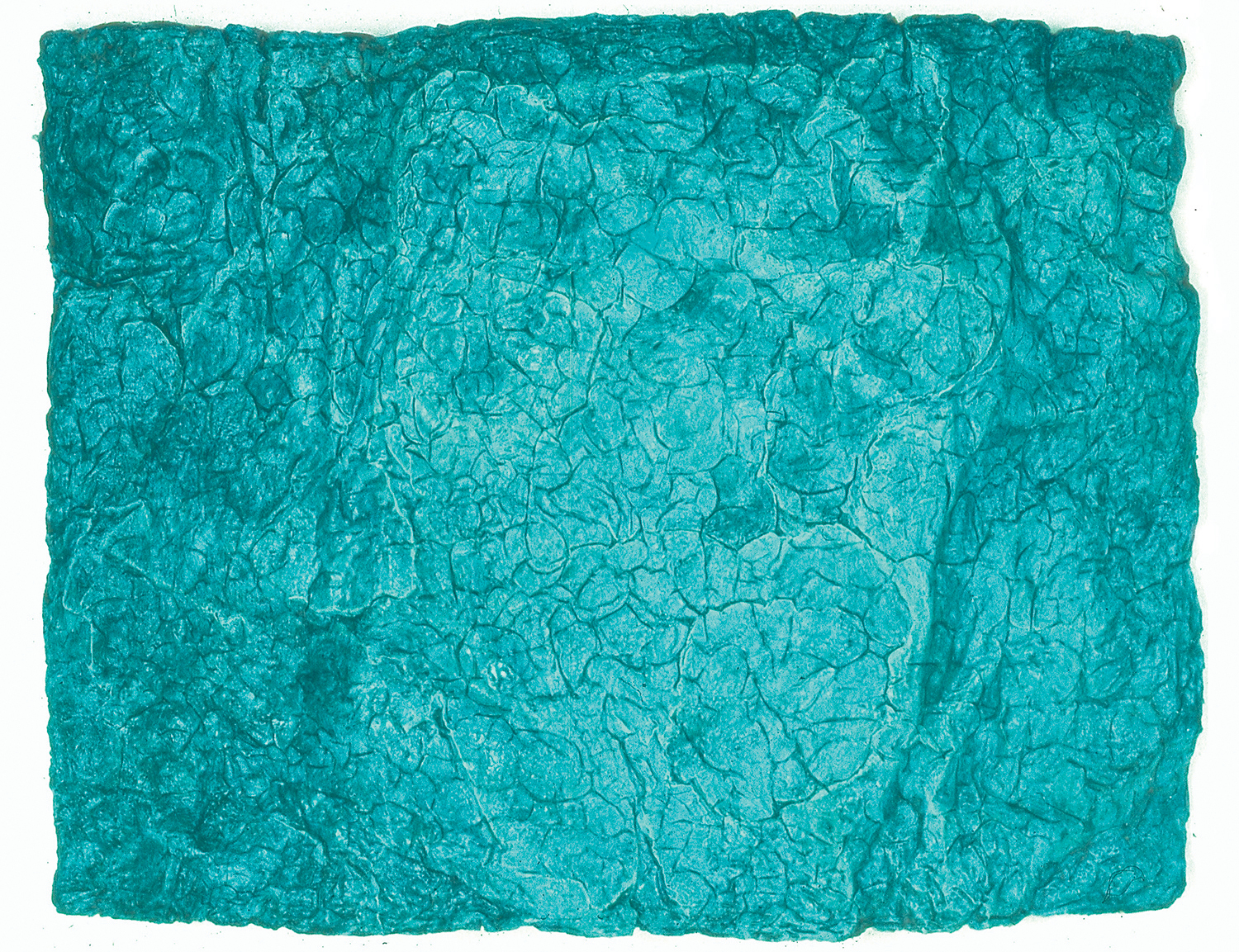
Blue Baby, 1981

== Notable exhibitions ==
"Special Projects," at MoMA P.S.1., NYC (1981), "Houses for Hereafter," A.I.R. Gallery, NYC (1990), "Hinterglasmalerei," A.I.R. Gallery, NYC (1994), "Pine Plains Paintings," Tricia Collins Grand Salon, NYC (1997), "Palm Project," A.I.R. Gallery, Brooklyn, NY (2011) "Figures and Grounds: Approaches to Abstraction," The Arts Club of Chicago, Chicago, IL (2012), "Stephanie Bernheim: Pixels and Particulates," Hudson Hall, Hudson, NY (2018).

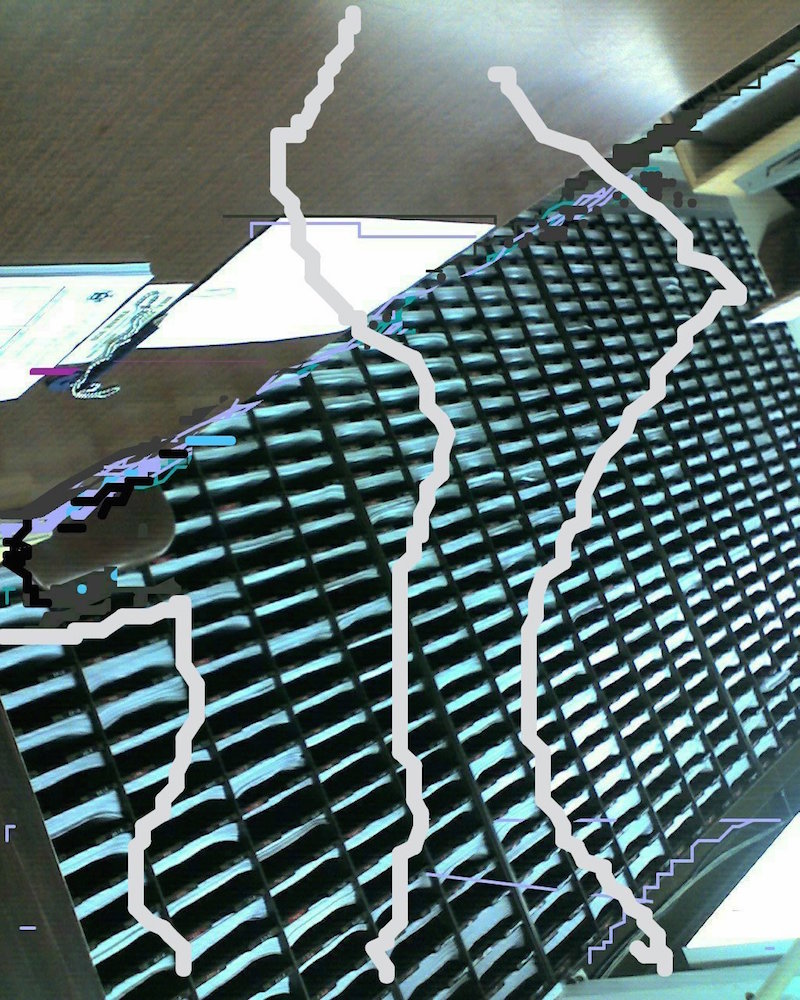
Albanyblugrid, 2016

== Major collections ==
- The Art Museum at Princeton, Princeton, NJ
- The Cincinnati Museum, Book Collection, Cincinnati, OH
- Franklin Furnace, New York, NY
- The Metropolitan Museum of Art, New York, NY
- Milwaukee Museum of Art, Milwaukee, WI
- Yale University Art Gallery, New Haven, CT
- Estee Lauder Corporation, New York, NY;
- Washington Country Museum of Fine Arts, Hagerstown, MD.

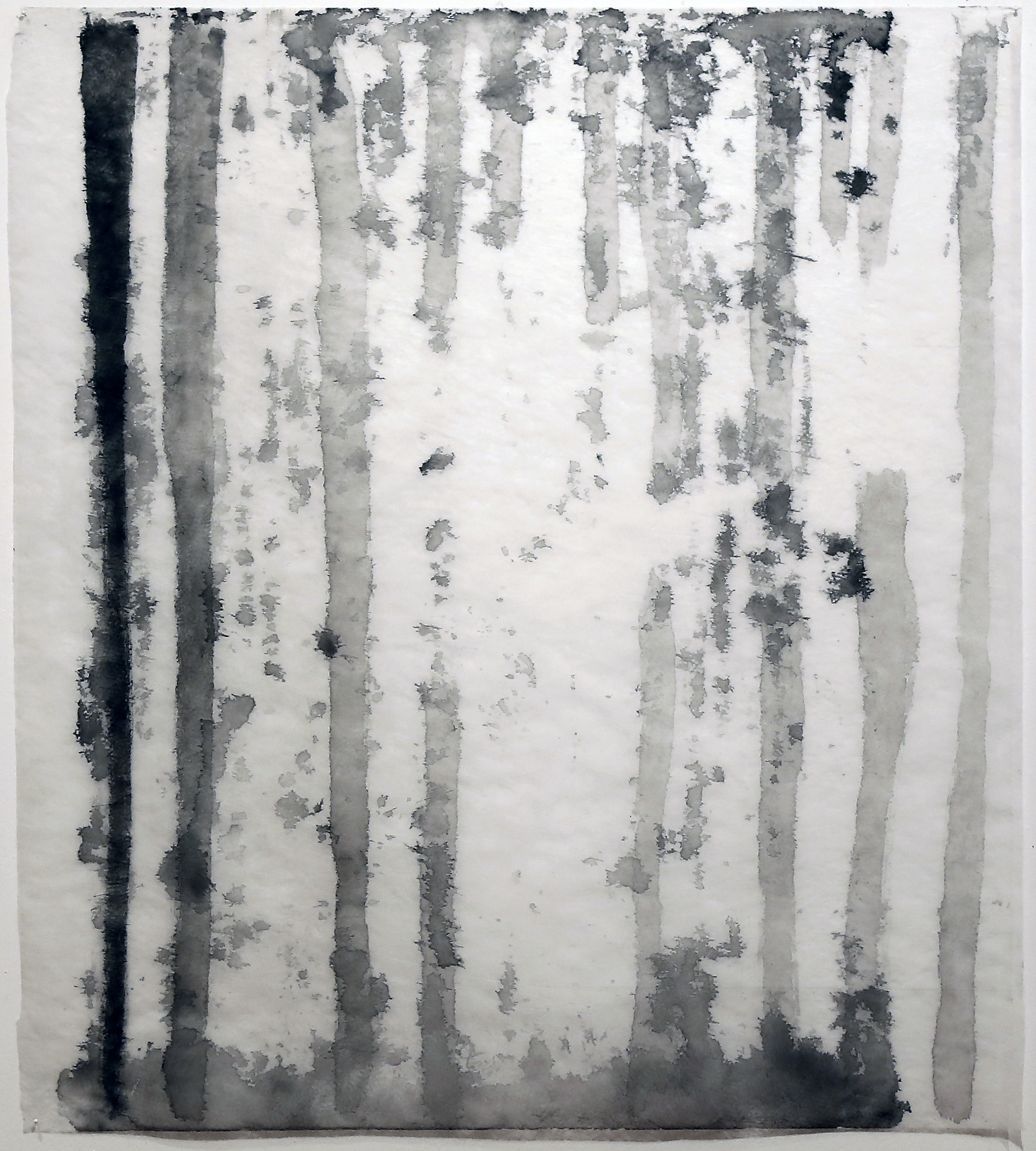
Lutradur Painting 18, 2018
