= Patsy Norvell =

American artist

- Born: Patsy Ann Norvell; 1942; Greenville, South Carolina
- Died: October 12, 2013 (aged 70–71)
- Education: Bennington College; Hunter College
- Known for: sculpture, installation art, public art
- Movement: feminist art
- Spouse: Robert Zakanitch
- Awards: National Endowment for the Arts; Pollock-Krasner Foundation
- Website: https://www.airgallery.org/patsy-norvell

Patsy Ann Norvell (1942–2013) was an American visual artist who worked in sculpture, installation art and public art. She was a pioneering feminist artist active in the Women's movement since 1969. In 1972 she was a founder of A.I.R. Gallery which was the first cooperative gallery in the U.S. that showed solely women's work. Her work has been exhibited in galleries and museums in the U.S. and abroad. She received numerous grants, awards and residencies for her achievements, including the Pollock-Krasner Foundation and the National Endowment for the Arts. She created permanent public art works for the New York City subway system, designed and created lobby and plaza installations in Los Angeles, CA, New Brunswick, NJ, Bridgeport, CT, and Bethesda, MD. Her work has received historical and critical acclaim, and has been written about in books, journals and newspapers including, Art in the Land: A Critical Anthology of Environmental Art, in Sculpture (magazine), the Los Angeles Times, The New York Times and numerous other publications.

== Education ==
She attended Oakwood School in Poughkeepsie, New York and graduated from there in 1960. Novell received her Bachelor of Art degree from Bennington College in art and mathematics, and a Masters of Art from Hunter College in sculpture.

== Involvement in the Women's Movement ==
Norvell was a prominent figure in the Women's Movement, actively participating since 1969. Norvell was involved in several artist consciousness raising groups to raise awareness of issues of gender inequality to the greater public. She went on to start consciousness-raising groups of her own.

Norvell exhibited in 13 Women show in 1972 in New York City. Also in 1972 she co-founded A.I.R. Gallery the first women's cooperative gallery. A.I.R. Gallery is a permanent exhibition space that supports an open exchange of ideas and risk–taking by women artists in order to provide support and visibility.

Her image is included in the iconic 1972 poster Some Living American Women Artists by Mary Beth Edelson.

== Notable works ==
Norvell's early work focussed on the natural world and how she could recapture nature for internal spaces. She worked mainly with painted steel and later with glass and wood. She also worked with autobiographical references, approached using nontraditional techniques.

Her 1973 work, Hair Quilt is a 5' by 8' wall piece made from clippings of her friends hair and scotch "magic" tape. The hair is arranged in patterns occupying 20 quilted squares.

In 1979 Norvell wanted to further explore her interest in outdoor versus indoor spaces. She used glass as a material the explores volume, limits surface and transparency. In 1979 she created Glass Garden. Glass Garden functions as a greenhouse or pure structure that can be indoors or outdoors. Her use of glass continued, employing methods of sandblasting it with botanical motifs. Norvell was asked to create several public art installations, including a piece at the Beverley and the Courtelyou subway stations in the borough of Brooklyn in New York city. The work uses a geometric design in the fence that is sandblasted into the glass with images of ivy. The overall design includes sand-blasted bay windows, arched windows, stairway windows and painted steel fencing.

Her other permanent installations include Newsstands in Manhattan, and plaza and lobby installations in Los Angeles, CA; New Brunswick, NJ; Bridgeport, CT; and Bethesda, MD, among others.

== Exhibitions ==
In 1972 her work was exhibited in a pioneering show of women art, 13 Women, that originated in New York City. In 1973, Norvell worked with others to found the A.I.R. Gallery, the first women's cooperative gallery in the United States. She had a retrospective exhibition at the Vassar College Art Gallery, entitled, Patsy Norvell: Ten Years 1969 - 1979. She has shown at the Brooklyn Museum, A.I.R. Gallery (New York, NY), MoMA P.S. 1 (Long Island City, NY), Wallace Art Gallery, SUNY Old Westbury, Hillwood Art Gallery, (Long Island University). During her lifetime, she had thirteen solo exhibitions, and participated in 98 group exhibitions.

== Permanent collections ==
Norvell's work is in the collection of the Smithsonian American Art Museum and the Whitney Museum of American Art.
