= Ree Morton =

American visual artist (1933–1977)

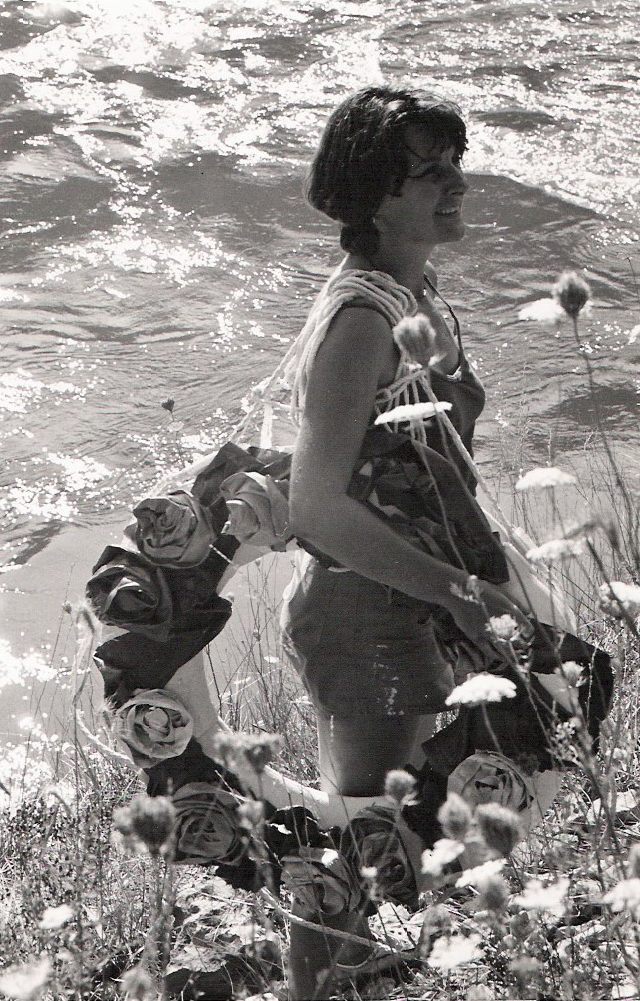
- Ree Morton in Maid in the Mist (1976)
- Born: August 3, 1936; Ossining, New York
- Died: April 30, 1977 (aged 40); Chicago, Illinois
- Education: Tyler School of Art
- Movement: Postminimalist

Ree Morton (August 3, 1936 – April 30, 1977) was an American visual artist who was closely associated with the postminimalist and feminist art movements of the 1970s.

== Life and career ==
Ree Morton was born on August 3, 1936, in Ossining, New York. A mother of three and the former wife of a navy officer, Morton lived a relatively nomadic life and began her artistic practice as a hobby through drawing. She decided to become a full-time artist in the late 1960s, receiving a BFA from the University of Rhode Island in 1968 and an MFA from the Tyler School of Art at Temple University in 1970.

Morton worked in a variety of mediums including sculpture, drawing and installation. Morton deployed "confrontational innocence," as described by art historian Lucy Lippard, and humor in her sculptures that referenced everyday decorative forms such as curtains, ruffles and swags. Morton self-described her work as "light and ironic on serious subjects without frivolity." Her piece Bake Sale (1974), for instance, was spurred on by a male faculty member at the Philadelphia College of Art who suggested that women on the faculty should stick to bake sales. Formally, Bake Sale (which features a comically low table covered with cakes and pastries against a wall of Celastic bows) typifies the playful interrelationships of objects Morton sought to create in her work.

Curator Marcia Tucker describes Morton's work as "unusual in its totality; it incorporates painting, sculpture, real and crafted objects, natural and artificial materials. The work is intelligent without being intellectual, narrative without being literary and ironic without being whimsical. Its multiplicity, contradictory and slightly perverse nature, its response to natural forms and its sources in primitive human phenomena result in a unique sculptural mode." Morton's art frequently combined an interest in poetry, language, and semiotics.

Though she mostly received attention for her sculptural work during her lifetime, Morton continued to draw, write and sketch throughout her career. Morton died at the age of 40 in a car accident in Chicago, Illinois on April 30, 1977.

== Public works ==
=== Artpark residency ===
From July 21 to August 17, 1976, Ree Morton participated in the residency program at Artpark in Lewiston, New York. Her work there was created around the natural beauty and the history of the site involving both painting and landscape. She developed two works during the residency, Regarding Landscape, and The Maid of the Mist.

In Regarding Landscape, Morton utilized a pre-existing wall in front of a waterfall along the Upper Gorge Trail. There she started by decorating the wall with arches, drapery, roses, and streamers. In her statement in the Artpark Visual Arts Program catalog, Morton specified that her intention was, “to increase the theatrical, dramatic quality already present at the site; to make the location as much like a diorama as possible.” The second part of this piece was to glue paintings of various shots of the landscape onto surrounding rocks, bordered by a colorful frame. The idea for this was for the paintings to be juxtaposed to the actual landscape that it references.

For Maid of the Mist, Morton painted a thirty-five-foot ladder yellow and decorated it with Celastic ribbons and roses and incorporated two life preservers decorated with flowers and streamers into the event as well. The ladder was placed on the hill, going into the water, with one life preserver in the water tied to the shore and another tied to Morton's waist. She cut the rope connecting the life preserver floating in the water and released it into the current. This piece directly references the legend of the Maid of the Mist, where a maiden was sent over the falls as a bride to the Niagara River. Morton refers to The Maid of the Mist as both a “symbolic rescue” and a “memorial event”.

=== Something in the Wind ===
Developed in 1974, Something in the Wind was an installation of over one hundred flags on the schooner Lettie G. Howard at the South Street Seaport Museum in New York. Each hand-sewn flag featured the first name of someone close to Morton, from her children to artists such as Barbara Kruger, Rosemary Mayer, Italo Scanga, and Laurie Anderson, along with an associated drawing. Originally conceived as an installation for Rockefeller Center, the piece was intended to bring private life and relationships into public space.

== Reception and early exhibition history ==
Ree Morton's work has been revered by artists, critics and curators since 1973 when her Souvenir Piece was the inaugural exhibition at Artists Space (selected by Nancy Graves) in 1973. In December, Artforum published Lucy Lippard's essay Ree Morton: At the Still Point of the Turning World (reprinted in Lippard's seminal 1976 book From the Center). Morton had a solo exhibition in the lobby gallery of the Whitney Museum of American Art in 1974.

== Legacy and posthumous exhibition history ==
Following her untimely death, in 1980 the New Museum in New York City presented Ree Morton: Retrospective 1971-1977, organized by Alan Schwartzman and Kathleen Thomas. The exhibition traveled to the Renaissance Society at the University of Chicago, Albright-Knox Art Gallery (Buffalo, NY), University of Colorado Museum (Boulder), and to the Contemporary Arts Museum Houston. In 2000, the Robert Hull Fleming Museum at the University of Vermont hosted an exhibition titled The Mating Habits of Lines: Sketchbooks and Notebooks of Red Morton, curated by Morton's friend, the artist Barbara Zucker. The exhibition also traveled to the Rosenwald Wolf Gallery at the University of the Arts in Philadelphia.

Morton enjoyed a successful artistic career during her lifetime, and has often been cited as an inspiration by a diverse group of artists including Lari Pittman, Jeanne Silverthorne and more recently, Alex DaCorte. In 2007, Marc Foxx Gallery in Los Angeles, organized For Ree which included the work of Jim Hodges, Evan Holloway, Susan Philipsz, Amada Ross-Ho and Frances Stark, alongside works by Morton.

Between 2008 and 2015, three solo museum exhibitions on Morton were organized. An extensive exhibition of her work was displayed at the Generali Foundation in Vienna, Austria in 2008; an exhibition of her works on paper and related sculpture was shown at Drawing Center in New York in 2009, titled At the Still Point of the Turning World after a T.S. Eliot quote that Morton kept above her desk; and in 2015, the Museo Nacional Centro de Arte Reina Sofía presented a retrospective of Morton's work called Ree Morton: Be a Place, Place an Image, Imagine a Poem. In 2018 the Institute of Contemporary Art, Philadelphia held the first major solo museum exhibition of Morton's work in the United States in over 35 years.

== Selected exhibitions ==
=== Selected solo exhibitions ===
- 2018: The Plant That Heals May Also Poison, Institute of Contemporary Art, University of Pennsylvania
- 2016: Something in the Wind, Alexander and Bonin, New York
- 2015: Be a Place, Place an Image, Imagine a Poem - Ree Morton: A retrospective, Museo Nacional Centro de Arte Reina Sofía, Madrid
- 2009: At the Still Point of the Turning World, The Drawing Center, New York
- 2008-2009: The Deities Must be Made to Laugh. Works 1971-1977, Generali Foundation, Vienna
- 1999-2002: The Mating Habits of Lines: Sketchbooks and Notebooks of Ree Morton, Fleming Museum of Art, University of Vermont, Burlington; The University of the Arts, Philadelphia; Art in General, New York
- 1998: Celastic works and Drawings: 1974-77, Alexander and Bonin, New York
- 1997: Ree Morton (1936-1977), Annemarie Verna Galerie, Zürich
- 1993: Works from 1971-1974, Brooke Alexander, New York
- 1985: Manipulations of the Organic, Solomon R. Guggenheim Museum, New York
- 1982: Ree Morton. Selected Works: 1974-1976, Max Protetch Gallery, New York
- 1980-1981: Ree Morton: Retrospective 1971-1977, The New Museum, New York; Contemporary Arts Museum, Houston; University of Colorado Museum, Boulder; Albright-Knox Gallery, Buffalo, NY; Renaissance Society at the University of Chicago
- 1977: Ree Morton 1936-1977, Grey Art Gallery, New York University
- 1977: Droll/Kolbert Gallery, New York
- 1976: Regional Pieces, Bykert Gallery, New York
- 1974: To Each Concrete Man, Whitney Museum of American Art, New York
- 1973: Souvenir Piece, Artists Space, New York

=== Selected group exhibitions ===
- 2020-2021: Don't Let This Be Easy, Walker Art Center, Minneapolis, MN
- 2016: Drawing Dialogues: Selections from the Sol LeWitt Collection, The Drawing Center, New York
- 2012-2013: Once Removed: Sculpture’s Changing Frame of Reference, Yale University Art Gallery, New Haven
- 2010-2011: Singular Visions, Whitney Museum of American Art, New York
- 2007-2009: WACK! Art and the Feminist Revolution, Museum of Contemporary Art, Los Angeles; National Museum of Women in the Arts, Washington, DC; MoMA PS1, New York; Vancouver Art Gallery
- 2005: Looking at Words: The Formal Presence of Text in Modern and Contemporary Works of Art, Andrea Rosen Gallery, New York
- 1995: In a Different Light, Berkeley Art Museum, Berkeley, CA
- 1990-1991: Word as Image: American Art, 1960–1990, Milwaukee Art Museum; Oklahoma City Museum of Art; The Contemporary Arts Museum, Houston
- 1984: Content: A Contemporary Focus 1974-1984, Hirshhorn Museum and Sculpture Garden, Washington, DC
- 1979-1980: The 1970s: New American Painting, The New Museum, New York; National Museum, Belgrade; National Museum, Zagreb; Moderna Galerija, Ljubljana; Fiera della Sardegna, Cagliari, Sardinia; Civica Galleria d'Arte Moderna, Palermo, Sicily; North Jutland Museum, Copenhagen; Geodesic Dome in Nepliget Park, Budapest; Geodesic, Dome in Parcul Herastan Park, Bucharest; BWA Gallery, Torun, Poland; Ministry of Culture, Łódź, Poland; National Museum, Warsaw
- 1978: Matrix/Berkeley 2, Berkeley Art Museum, Berkeley, CA
- 1976: Contemporary Women: Consciousness and Content, Brooklyn Museum
- 1976: Improbable Furniture, Institute of Contemporary Art, University of Pennsylvania; La Jolla Museum of Contemporary Art, CA; Museum of Contemporary Art, Chicago
- 1975: Personal Concern, Material Support, Institute of Contemporary Art, Boston
- 1973: Biennial Exhibition of Contemporary American Painting and Sculpture, Whitney Museum of American Art, New York

== Selected collections ==
- Berkeley Art Museum and Pacific Film Archive, CA
- Institute of Contemporary Art, Boston
- Albright-Knox Art Gallery, Buffalo
- Harvard University Art Museums, Cambridge, MA
- Art Institute of Chicago
- Museum of Contemporary Art, Chicago
- Los Angeles County Museum of Art
- Museum of Contemporary Art, Los Angeles
- Museo Nacional Centro de Arte Reina Sofía, Madrid
- Museum of Contemporary Art, North Miami
- Walker Art Center, Minneapolis
- Yale University Art Gallery, New Haven
- Brooklyn Museum, New York
- Museum of Modern Art, New York
- Solomon R. Guggenheim Museum, New York
- Whitney Museum of American Art, New York
- Allen Memorial Art Museum, Oberlin, OH
- Pennsylvania Academy of the Fine Arts, Philadelphia
- Philadelphia Museum of Art
- Museu de Arte Contemporânea, Fundação Serralves, Porto
- Rhode Island School of Design Museum
- Generali Foundation, Vienna
- National Gallery of Art, Washington DC

== Selected bibliography ==
- Folie, Sabine and Lafer, Ilse, eds., with texts by Ammer, Manuela, Folie, Sabine, Lafer, Ilse, and Ribas, João. Ree Morton: Be a Place, Place an Image, Imagine a Poem, ex. cat. Madrid: Museo Nacional Centro de Arte Reina Sofía, 2015 ISBN 9788480265171
- Ribas, João, ed., with texts by Butler, Cornelia H., Schwartzman, Allan and Lippard, Lucy R. At the Still Point of the Turning World, ex. cat. The Drawing Center, New York, 2009 ISBN 9780942324488
- Folie, Sabine, ed., with texts by Baldon, Diana, Folie, Sabine, Molesworth, Helen, and Neubauer, Susanne. Ree Morton: Works 1971–1977, ex. cat. Vienna: Generali Foundation, 2009 ISBN 978-3941185302
- Cohen, Janie, Schwartzman, Allan and Zucker, Barbara. The Mating Habits of Lines: Sketchbooks and Notebooks of Ree Morton, ex. cat. Burlington, VT: Robert Hull Fleming Museum, University of Vermont, 2000 ISBN 9780934658072
- Schwartzman, Allan, and Thomas, Kathleen. Ree Morton – Retrospective 1971 – 1977, ex. cat. New York: The New Museum, 1980
- Morton, Ree. “Analects” in Sondheim, Alan, ed. Individuals: Post-Movement Art in America. New York: E.F. Dutton, 226–245, 1977 ISBN 978-0525474289
