= Ellen McMahon =

American graphic designer and professor (born 1951)

- Born: 1951 (age 74–75)
- Occupations: Artist, illustrator, educator, graphic designer
- Title: Professor in the School of Art and Associate Dean for Research in the Arts
- Website: "Ellen McMahon"

Ellen McMahon (born 1951) is a professor in the School of Art and Associate Dean for Research in the Arts in the College of Fine Arts at the University of Arizona.

== Biography ==
McMahon attended Southern Oregon State College and in 1978 received a Bachelor of Science degree in biology, she continued her education at the University of Arizona and earned her Master of Science degree in Scientific Illustration in 1983. McMahon continued her education at Vermont College and received a Master of Fine Arts in Visual Art in 1996.

She uses a range of media to examine the relationship between visual art and how people might apply artistic practice to address environmental issues.

== Work ==
McMahon's early work, from the 1990s to 2005, looked at the intimacy of relationships between a mother and child. Since 2005 she has focused her educational approach on how creative practice might contribute to environmental awareness. She received a Fulbright Fellowship in 2007 to work at the Center for the Study of Deserts and Oceans in Mexico (CEDO) and presented at the ICOGRADA World Design Congress in Cuba. She has developed projects that connect artists, students, scientists and community organizations in this effort. McMahon was the project director and co-editor of the publication Ground|Water: The Art, Design and Science of a Dry River in 2010. The book looks at how different factors such as environmental change and water policy have affected groundwater in the Southwest.

Her work has been featured in Mother Reader: Essential Writings on Motherhood, AIGA Journal of Graphic Design, in an essay titled Outside the Cookie Cutter: Approaches to Teaching Graphic Design, Representations: Journal of the Design Communication Association, in an essay titled Exchanges: A collaborative Teaching Project, The Education of the Graphic Designer, edited by Steve Heller, in an essay titled Have Sign Will Travel: Cultural Issues in Design Education, and in the Longwood Arts Journal, a publication of the Longwood Arts Project, in an essay titled Maternity, Autonomy, Ambivalence and Loss.

== Group exhibitions ==
2002 –2004 “Rounce and Coffin Western Books Exhibition,” traveling to over thirty public and academic libraries over two years. Originating at Occidental College, Los Angeles

1997, 1999, 2001, 2003 “Arizona Biennial," Tucson Museum of Art, Tucson, Arizona

1997, 1998, 2002 “Generations," A.I.R. Gallery, New York City

1998 “Cleavage: an exhibition on the breast,” Adams State College, Luther Bean Museum, Alamosa, Colorado (traveled to Jonson Gallery of the University of New Mexico Art Museum)

1998 “The Fragmented Body: Violence or Identity?” W. Keith and Janet Kellogg University Art Gallery, California State Polytechnic University, Pomona, California

1998 “Low Land Horizon,” Cullity Gallery, Western Australia University School of Architecture and Fine Arts, Perth, Australia

1998 “Visual Arts Fellowship Recipients Exhibition,” Tucson/Pima Arts Council Gallery, Tucson, Arizona

1996 “Transforming the Mirror: Women in Photography,” Marshal/Reade Gallery, Boston, Massachusetts

1996 “International Photography and Digital Imaging Exhibition,” Wellington B. Gray Gallery, East Carolina University, Greenville, North Carolina

1996 “An Invitational Exhibition of U.S. Posters in Rzeszow," originating in Rzeszow Poland, venues to date: Rzeszow Art Gallery, Czestochowa Town Art Gallery, Krosno Art Gallery, Przemysl Center of Artbeen, and locations in Bydgoszcz and Zakopane, traveled to several locations in Hungry and Slovakia in 1998

1995 “Josten, McMahon, Penn,” three-person exhibition, funded by grants from the Arizona Commission on the Arts and the Tucson/Pima Arts Council, Dinnerware Artist's Cooperative Gallery, Tucson, Arizona

1995 “Billboards for Democracy,” Hunter College, New York City

1995 “Deadly Responses: Murder and Suicide by Women,” Longwood Arts Project, a program of the Bronx Council on the Arts, Bronx, New York

1995 “Public as Private,” Boulder City Arts Commission Gallery, Boulder, Colorado

1994 “The University and College Designers Association Annual Exhibition,” Minneapolis, Minnesota

1993 “It’s All Relative,” Galleria Mesa, Mesa, Arizona, Juror's Award

1993 “Beyond Words,” Woman Made Gallery, Chicago, Illinois

== Solo Exhibits ==
2002 “Maternal Matter: Books, Cards and Drawings,” California State University, San Marcos, California

1997 “Redressing the Mother: Photographs, Text, and Objects,” A.I.R. Gallery II, New York City

1997 “Mama Do You Love Me,” an installation of objects, light, and sound, Icehouse Alternative Art Space, Phoenix, Arizona

1996 “Maternity, Autonomy, Ambivalence and Loss,” Wood Gallery, Vermont College of Norwich University, Montpelier, Vermont
