= Diyan Achjadi =

Indonesian-born Canadian artist, printmaker and animator

- Born: Jakarta, Indonesia
- Education: Bachelor of Fine Arts from Cooper Union and Master of Fine Arts from Concordia University
- Known for: printmaking
- Notable work: Girl in the City, The Further Adventures of Girl, Java, Toile, Drift, Coming Soon, How Far Do You Travel

Diyan Achjadi is a Vancouver-based printmaker, drawer and animator whose practice explores themes of cross-culture imaginings, influences and contaminations. She was born in Jakarta, Indonesia to a West-Javanese father and English-Canadian mother.

== Early life and education ==
As a child and teen Achjadi lived in Hong Kong, London, Jakarta and Washington, DC before moving to New York for ten years. Her formative years involved navigating different educational, political and cultural systems, which influenced her art work. She received a BFA from the Cooper Union (New York, NY) and an MFA from Concordia University (Montreal, QC). After teaching at the University of Maryland, she moved to Vancouver in 2005. She has exhibited her work in galleries and film festivals across Canada and beyond.

== Career ==
Diyan Achjadi is currently an Associate Professor of Print Media at the Emily Carr University of Art + Design in Vancouver, BC.

== Art ==
Achjadi's work explores cross-cultural narratives through printmaking, drawing and animation. The following are some examples of her work:

=== Girl ===
In this series of animations; web projects; large-scale, ink-jet prints; and multimedia installations, a cartoon girl depicted in bright colours plays in war-torn areas and environmental disaster sites, or parachutes into cities. The works investigate the impacts of militarism and war on children, and consider gender roles and violence in children's media. In Further Adventures with Girl, the character Girl is transposed into scenes of environmental disaster.

=== Coming Soon ===
Coming Soon is a public art project that consists of a series of prints published each month from 2018 to 2019. The prints were installed monthly on buildings and fences around Vancouver, BC. The prints depict construction sites with pylons, construction netting and other construction materials to explore the impact of rapid urban development on residents and visitors to the city.

=== How Far Do You Travel ===
Achjadi's artwork, NonSerie (In Commute), which reconfigures historical Indonesian illustrations, covered a Vancouver TransLink bus as part of a year-long project curated by the Contemporary Art Gallery.

== Selected exhibitions ==
2006

- See Girl (March, Girl, March!), Access Artist Run Centre, Vancouver, BC.

2009

- Sugar Bombs: Diyan Achjadi and Brendan Tang, Kamloops Art Gallery, Kamloops, BC.

2010

- Construction Site: Identity and Place, Kamloops Art Gallery, Kamloops, BC

2011

- Further Adventures of Girl, Art Gallery of Greater Victoria, Victoria, BC

2015

- Residue: Tracing the Lore: Diyan Achjadi and Brendan Tang, Malaspina Printmakers, Vancouver, BC

2016

- Cultural Conflation: Diyan Achjadi and Shawn Hunt, Richmond Art Gallery, Richmond, BC.
- Residue: Tracing the Lore: Diyan Achjadi and Brendan Tang, Open Studio, Toronto, ON.
- Pattern Migration, Art Gallery of Mississauga, ON.

2017

- Animate: Diyan Achjadi and Alisi Telengut, Carleton University Art Gallery, Ottawa, ON.
- Façade Festival, Vancouver Art Gallery, Vancouver, BC.

2018

- Memories of the Future III: Diyan Achjadi and Cindy Mochizuki, Roedde House Museum, Vancouver, BC.
- Surface Handling: Diyan Achjadi and Brendan Tang, Dunlop Art Gallery, Regina, SK.

== Awards and grants ==
- 2017 Public Art Commission from the City of Vancouver
