= Enid Crow =

American photographer (born 1968)

- Born: 1968 (age 57–58)
- Citizenship: American
- Movement: Feminist art
- Website: www.enidcrow.com

Enid Crow (born 1968), is an American feminist artist who is best known for self-portrait photographs. She has had solo shows at A.I.R. Gallery (NYC), Holocene (Portland), and Constance Art Gallery (Iowa). Her photographs have been published in Venus Zine, riffRAG, 24/7, Altar. From 1991-1992, she was a member of Johannes Birringer's dance theatre company—AlienNation Co. -- in Chicago, Illinois. From 1997 to 2000 she studied Noh drama in Japan. From 2005 to 2008, she performed with Justin Duerr in the self-described lo-fi craft pop band the Vivian Girls Experience, based on the work of artist Henry Darger.

== Education ==
Crow has degrees from multiple universities. She studied at the State University of New York at Geneseo where she earned a bachelor of arts degree in Dramatic Arts. Next, she did her graduate studies in theater and performance at Northwestern University. Interestingly, Crow also has multiple degrees in fields unrelated to art and performance. Crow received a degree in Education from the University of Florida along with a J.D. degree from New York University.

== Style and technique ==
Much of Crow’s work exhibits a self-portrait format in which she often dresses up as various characters. Most of her work is organized into series which usually abide by a certain theme or message. For example, she pictured herself as working class laborers in “Happy Workers”, gay men in “Faggots”, stereotypical male archetypes in “History of Mustaches”, and a class of people in distress in “Disaster.” In these series, she adapts her looks, her clothes, and her surroundings to mimic the character she is trying to portray. Crow has stated that her characters are “Archetypal people and usually the way I think of the character is.” Many of her photographs are intentionally comical.
