= Rachel Farmer =

American artist

Rachel Farmer (born 1972 in Provo, Utah) is an American artist. She is primarily known for her ceramic sculpture and installations. Farmer's work explores Mormon history from a feminist and queer perspective, and is informed by her roots in the Utah area.

== Education ==
Farmer received a BFA from Brigham Young University in 1995, and an MFA from the School of the Art Institute of Chicago in 1997.

== Work ==
Farmer's work re-imagines history with a focus on the lives of women. Her small clay figurines enact gestures and roles that give life to the often invisible story of women. Her work has been described as "personal and meditative" and as "transforming traditional narratives of ancestry". Farmer's multimedia installations often incorporate photography, video, and textile arts. In her solo exhibition at the Leslie-Lohman Museum of Gay and Lesbian Art, Farmer created quilts for her installation using techniques learned as a child. She hosted several quilting bees in the making of the quilts.

== Recognition ==
Farmer is the recipient of an A.I.R. Gallery Fellowship and a Visual Art Grant from the Money for Women/Barbara Deming Fund. She has participated in artist residencies at the Museum of Arts and Design in New York, NY and the Brush Creek Arts Residency in Saratoga, WY. Her work is included in the Feminist Art Base (digital archive) at the Brooklyn Museum.

== Exhibitions ==
- Ancestors, A.I.R. Gallery, New York, NY
- Ancestors Traversing Quilts, Leslie-Lohman Museum of Gay and Lesbian Art, New York, NY
- Looking Forward, Looking Back, Granary Arts, Ephraim, UT
