= Blythe Bohnen =

American artist

- Born: 1940 (age 85–86); Evanston, Illinois
- Education: Smith College (BA); Boston University (BFA); Hunter College (MFA)
- Known for: Drawing, photography

Blythe Bohnen (1940-2022) is an American artist known for her minimalistic graphite drawings and photographs that represent aspects of motion. She uses shutter speed.

== Early life and education ==
Bohnen earned a Bachelor of Arts in art history at Smith College, Bachelor of Fine Arts at Boston University, and Master of Fine Arts at Hunter College.

== Art career ==
She was one of the founding members of A.I.R. Gallery, established in New York City in 1972, the first not-for-profit, cooperative exhibition space for women in the United States.

Bohnen's work is generally conceptual in nature, often in the form of self-portraits that capture the motions of her body. She originally created works using predominantly graphite, but added photography to her repertoire in 1974 to continue her exploration of movement and the human form, titling each work after the motions she was making to create each work.

Her drawings feature a grid format that she used to arrange the severely limited and carefully executed motions of her hand that she captured in the graphite, resulting in monochromatic drawings that assert their reality as markings on paper instead of an illusion of something else, as seen in Motion Touching Five Points with Graphite Stick (1973), One Motion with Graphite Stick, Horizontal and Vertical (1974), and Motion Touching Five Points (1975; Art Institute of Chicago).

In contrast to her drawings, which focus on the motions of the arm and hand, Bohnen's photographs primarily address the motions of the head. With her photography, Bohnen used various shutter speeds to overlap blurred images to provoke strong emotional and intellectual reactions about motion and identity, as in Self-Portrait: Vertical Elliptical Motion, Large (1974; Asheville Art Museum) and Vertical Motion Up Medium: Pivotal Motion Medium (1983; Brooklyn Museum).

== Collections ==
Her work is included in collections of the Asheville Art Museum, the Brooklyn Museum, the Art Institute of Chicago, the International Center of Photography, and the Museum of Fine Arts Houston.

== Publications ==
Blythe Bohnen. Being There and Not Being There, ed. David Hall Gallery, Wellesley, Massachusetts 2023, ISBN 978-1-7355143-0-7, 168 pages, with essays by Silke von Berswordt-Wallrabe, Suzanne Hudson, Anna Lovatt, Karen Irvine, David Mather.
