= Sue Hettmansperger =

American visual artist

- Born: 1948 (age 77–78); Akron, Ohio, United States
- Education: University of New Mexico
- Known for: Painting, drawing, collage
- Awards: Guggenheim Fellowship, National Endowment for the Arts
- Website: Sue Hettmansperger

Sue Hettmansperger (born 1948) is an American artist known for paintings and collages that work across the spectrum of modernist abstraction and representational imagery. Her work explores the interconnectedness of human, botanical and inorganic systems, scientific concepts and ecological concerns. She has been awarded Guggenheim and National Endowment for the Arts fellowships and her work belongs to the public collections of the Metropolitan Museum of Art, Art Institute of Chicago and Des Moines Art Center, among other institutions. She lives and works in Iowa City and is Professor Emerita of Art at the University of Iowa.

Sue Hettmansperger, "Iterations" series, oil painting on linen, group of four, 56" x 55", 2021.

== Early life and career ==
Hettmansperger was born in Akron, Ohio in 1948. She grew up in Albuquerque, New Mexico and the region's landscape is said to have had a longstanding influence on her color palette and interest in nature. She studied at the Yale University Summer School in Art in 1971 and earned a BFA and MA in lithography and drawing from the University of New Mexico in 1972 and 1974, respectively. In 1977, she joined the art faculty at the University of Iowa, where she taught until 2018.

Hettmansperger's first featured exhibitions were at the Roswell Museum and Art Center in New Mexico (1976) and Frumkin and Struve Gallery in Chicago (1980, 1981). In the two Chicago shows she presented abstract colored pencil and mixed-media drawings consisting of mazes of looping, overlapping strips, quadrants, zigzags and geometric shapes that formed shallow but complex spaces. She received significant attention from Chicago art critics Alan Artner and David Elliot of ARTnews. Eliot wrote that Hettmansperger's enigmatic spaces adapted the minimal forms of Constructivism and American Precisionism to create work that was "tactile in its crisp architecture, yet sensuous and spirited … almost spookily mysterious."

In 1989, Hettmansperger began a long affiliation with A.I.R. Gallery in New York City—the first women artists' cooperative established in the United States—which included seven solo exhibitions between 1990 and 2014. She has also had solo shows at Artemisia Gallery in Chicago (1995) and Swarthmore College (2019), and appeared in group exhibitions at the Art Institute of Chicago, Cedar Rapids Museum of Art, Figge Art Museum, Hal Bromm Gallery and Hyde Park Art Center, among others.

== Work and reception ==
Critics relate Hettmansperger's work formally to the American modernist tradition of abstract or abstracted art rooted in nature (e.g., Georgia O'Keeffe, Arthur Dove and Marsden Hartley) and, in its interest in natural beauty, to 19th-century natural history painters such as Audubon and Charles R. Knight. Curator Kathy Edwards has characterized the images as "simultaneously landscape, bodyscape, and mindscape." Hettmansperger's influences range from the formal theories of Josef Albers to scientific concepts involving topology, biology, botany and physics to the southwest desert landscape. Her work has often begun with small-scale experiments in collage that can function as distinct artworks or serve as compositional studies for her oil paintings.

Sue Hettmansperger, "Iterations" series, mixed media collage on paper, 12" x 11", 2021.

Hettmansperger's individual canvasses, drawing installations and multi-panel works from the 1990s featured shifting aggregations of invented shapes, organic and manufactured forms, human anatomy and cartographic diagrams floating on fields of muted, dusk-like color. Critics have described her vocabulary as a symbolic, personal ecology of complex interconnectedness that places disparate imagery and subjects—and in the collages, materials—in a "democratic dialogue." Mario Naves wrote that her works "evoke the natural world as both a scientific discipline and an ecological conundrum."

In the 2000s, writers have noted a more dystopic ecological urgency in Hettmansperger's paintings, expressed through saturated colors, emblem-like forms, imagery of industrial by-products, and distortions created through digital manipulation. Generally, these works feature lone, multi-dimensional structures of interwoven elements that float near the center of undefined spaces and have been likened to "debris captured by a river current or ocean gyre" by curator Andrea Packard. Matt Freedman wrote that the Chimera paintings (2007) conveyed "the distinctiveness not only of contemporary and modernist art, but also of the postmodern human condition." Joe Fyfe suggested that the "Entanglement" series (2010–1) depicts images of wreckage, like "fossilized remains of the present found in some extremely distant future."

The collages, paintings and polyptychs of Hettmansperger's "Iterations" series (2015–9) employ limited palettes and flattened surfaces that compress space using overlapping abstracted forms and aerial perspectives. Writers have interpreted them as elegies that mourn a lost connection to nature and have linked them in spirit to surrealist work and metaphysical paintings by Giorgio de Chirico that expressed the horrors of war.

Hettmansperger has also collaborated with composer Lawrence Fritts on the video and sound works Mapppaemundi and Natural Language (both 2008), which explore the interrelationship of human and natural worlds as a cyclical feedback loop, using mathematical, biological, visual and sonic structures.

Sue Hettmansperger, Shadows, graphite on paper, 14" x 14", 1979.

== Public recognition ==
Hettmansperger has been awarded fellowships from the John S. Guggenheim Foundation (2008) and National Endowment for the Arts (1983), a grant from the Iowa Arts Council (2009), and artist residencies at Yaddo, Ucross Foundation, the Roswell Museum and Art Center and MacDowell Colony. Her work belongs to public collections of the Metropolitan Museum of Art, Art Institute of Chicago, Albuquerque Museum, Cedar Rapids Museum of Art, Des Moines Art Center, and Roswell Museum and Art Center, among others. Her work also appears in the 2005 Midwest and 15 Years (2009) volumes of New American Paintings.
