= Amelia Marzec =

American artist (born 1980)

Amelia Marzec (born 1980) is an American Interactive Artist based in New York City.

== Art ==
Marzec's work explores the effects that various technologies (particularly telecommunications) and the social conditions that surround them have on aspects of our interpersonal relationships such as privacy, intimacy, and publicity. She has frequently cited her experience of losing hearing in one ear, as well as her experience working inside a media giant compromised by the PRISM program (America Online) as formative.

== Career ==
Marzec received her Bachelor of Fine Arts (BFA) from Mason Gross School of the Arts in New Brunswick, New Jersey and her Master of Fine Arts (MFA) from Parsons School of Design. Her work has been exhibited at Flux Factory, New York Hall of Science, Governor's Island, MIT, SIGGRAPH, and the DUMBO Arts Festival. She has been awarded a residency at Eyebeam, the A.I.R. Gallery Emma Bee Bernstein Fellowship, a full commission for LUMEN, and a nomination for the World Technology Awards for Art.

Her work has been featured in Wired, Make, and Hyperallergic.
