= Louise Kramer =

American artist (1923–2020)

- Born: December 5, 1923; New York City, New York, U.S.
- Died: April 7, 2020 (aged 96)
- Occupation: Artist
- Known for: Printmaking; Drawing; Sculpture

Louise Kramer (December 5, 1923 – April 7, 2020) was an American artist who was known for working in a wide range of media, from printmaking to drawing, sculpture, and site-specific installation.

She was one of the founding members of the New York all-women cooperative, A.I.R. Gallery, in 1972.

Kramer has had solo shows at CUNY Graduate Center, May Museum, A.I.R. Gallery, B.J. Spoke Gallery, Central Hall Gallery, and Nassau County Museum of Fine Art. Her work has been included in numerous group shows including the Whitney Museum, the Brooklyn Museum, S.F. MoMA, and the Jewish Museum.

Her work is held in public collections including Smithsonian American Art Museum, Nassau Community College, Nassau County Museum of Fine Arts, Oberlin College Gallery (Oberlin, OH), CUNY Graduate Center (New York, NY) and University of Iowa Museum of Art.

Kramer has been reviewed in "The New York Times", "New York Times Magazine", "New York Magazine", "Artforum", "Art News", "The Village Voice", "Newsday", "Bridge Magazine", and "Arts Magazine". She has received fellowships and awards from the National Endowment for the Arts and the New York State Council on the Arts-CAPS.

Venues/organizations: A.I.R. Gallery, Smithsonian American Art Museum, Nassau Community College, Nassau County Museum of Fine Arts, CUNY Graduate Center, University of Iowa Museum of Art.
