= Maude Boltz =

American artist

- Born: 1939; Pottsville, Pennsylvania
- Died: 2017 (aged 77–78)
- Known for: fiber artist

Maude Boltz (1939-2017) was an American artist and co-founder of the A.I.R. Gallery.

== Biography ==
Boltz was born in 1939 in Pottsville, Pennsylvania. She attended the Philadelphia College of Arts and Yale University. In 1972 Boltz co-founded the A.I.R. Gallery, a female artists cooperative gallery in New York City. In 1978 Boltz's work was included in a show at MoMA PS1 entitled Overview: An Exhibition in Two Parts by the A.I.R. Gallery. She died in 2017.

Her image is included in the iconic 1972 poster Some Living American Women Artists by Mary Beth Edelson.

Boltz's work is in the collection of the Smithsonian American Art Museum and the Whitney Museum of American Art.
