= Dotty Attie =

American painter

- Born: 1938 (age 87–88); Pennsauken, New Jersey
- Education: B.F.A., Philadelphia College of Art (1959)
- Known for: Painting, printmaking, photography
- Awards: Beckmann Fellowship (1960)
- Elected: National Academy (2013)

Dotty Attie (born 1938) is an American feminist painter, and the co-founder of the first all-female cooperative art gallery in the US, A.I.R. Gallery. Her work has been exhibited and is in museum collections, including the Whitney, the Museum of Modern Art, and the National Gallery in London. She also has an all-female punk rock band named after her. Attie resides in New York City.

== Early life and work ==
Attie was born in Pennsauken, New Jersey, and discovered her interest in art at an early age, as she found that she was interested in drawing. She was heavily influenced by her father, who brought her to art classes in Philadelphia and provided her with art books, most notably ones with illustrations of works by Jean-Auguste-Dominique Ingres. Although her favorite living artist happens to be Gerhard Richter.

Attie continued her education at the Philadelphia College of Art, where she graduated with a Bachelor of Fine Arts degree in 1959. While in college, Attie was primarily an Abstract Expressionist painter, but often realistically recreated the likeness of photographs on her canvases. Following her time at the Philadelphia College of Art, Attie continued her education through fellowships at the Brooklyn Museum of Art School in 1960, and the Art Students League in 1967.

== Feminism and A.I.R. Gallery ==
Attie's work in the 1960s received some attention, but gained far more recognition after her involvement in A.I.R. Gallery. In 1972, she co-founded A.I.R., a non-profit cooperative gallery and one of the first to exclusively feature the work of women artists. As an early artist-member, Attie helped the group to choose a gallery space and recruit members. Attie had her first solo show at the gallery in 1972. Shortly after, she felt the freedom to rediscover her early passion for drawing. Later, she was an integral part of the gallery's establishment of an international presence, and helped to secure shows in Paris, Israel, and Japan.

While still a member of A.I.R., Attie began to solidify her personal style, which remained fairly consistent throughout her career; she typically deconstructed existing images—such as Old Master paintings and early 20th Century black-and-white photographs—and her works often included text to create a narrative. Therefore, some of her works contain small pictures that were copied from other, sometimes famous, works by Caravaggio, Gustave Courbet, Thomas Eakins, and Ingres. Some of these pictures have been taken from the backgrounds of earlier works, bringing new perspectives to features which may have been formerly overshadowed. This produces a quality of differing scale, paired with short segments of text, which creates a cinematic quality throughout. The text and pictures are related, but do not contribute to a clear narrative, allowing the viewer to fill in the blanks left by the artist. Furthermore, her multi-panel paintings explore the depictions of the body in the history of art and critique the gender bias in the art world. By reanalyzing famous paintings, she emphasizes the hidden undertones within these works that degrade women previously unnoticed due to the male gaze with which they were originally painted. Because Attie, at times, has meticulously repainted well-known works but presented them in fragments or with other modifications, her work has addressed the concepts of originality and reproduction.

Attie's work is often characterized by her identification with feminism. She has explained, that feminism "means no barriers between what a woman chooses to do, and what is acceptable by societal and familial standards." These ideals are present in her work, which often contains manipulated images of women that accentuate their vulnerability, often featuring lewd acts of a sexual nature.

== Awards and recognition ==
Dotty Attie received multiple grants for her artwork, one being the Creative Artist Public Service Grant in 1976-77 and another being the National Endowment for the Arts Grant, which she won in 1976-77 and 1983–84.

== Later career ==
Her most recent exhibitions have been at the P.P.O.W. Gallery in New York City. What Would Mother Say (2009) featured children engaging in actions which, while innocent, may be construed by adults as provocative or shameful; each work is accompanied by two panels of text. More recently, The Lone Ranger (2013) served as a follow-up to What Would Mother Say and included a photo of a boy kissing a horse. According to Attie, that little boy grew up to be the Lone Ranger. Attie expresses that “All of my (her) work is about our hidden selves, the part of us we don’t want to share with others”, and this was her inspiration for “The Lone Ranger”. The overarching idea of the show is that "If a little boy does something, he will grow up to be a hero. But the little girls, doing the same thing, they all become whores." In 2013 she was working on a series of painting called the “Worst Case Scenarios”.

Attie's paintings are in the collections of The Museum of Modern Art, Whitney Museum of American Art, the Brooklyn Museum, the National Gallery in London, and many others.

In addition to numerous honors in the art world, such as her induction into the National Academy in 2013, Attie has the unusual distinction of having a punk rock band named after her; the female-led indie quartet Dottie Attie, based in Portland, Oregon, formed in 2013. Attie has been photographed wearing the band's t-shirts.

== Personal life ==
Attie's first life partner was David Attie, a prominent American commercial and fine art photographer with whom she had two sons, the widely published mathematician Oliver Attie and TV writer Eli Attie. Her current partner is David Olan, a classical composer.
