= Hans Breder =

German-American interdisciplinary artist

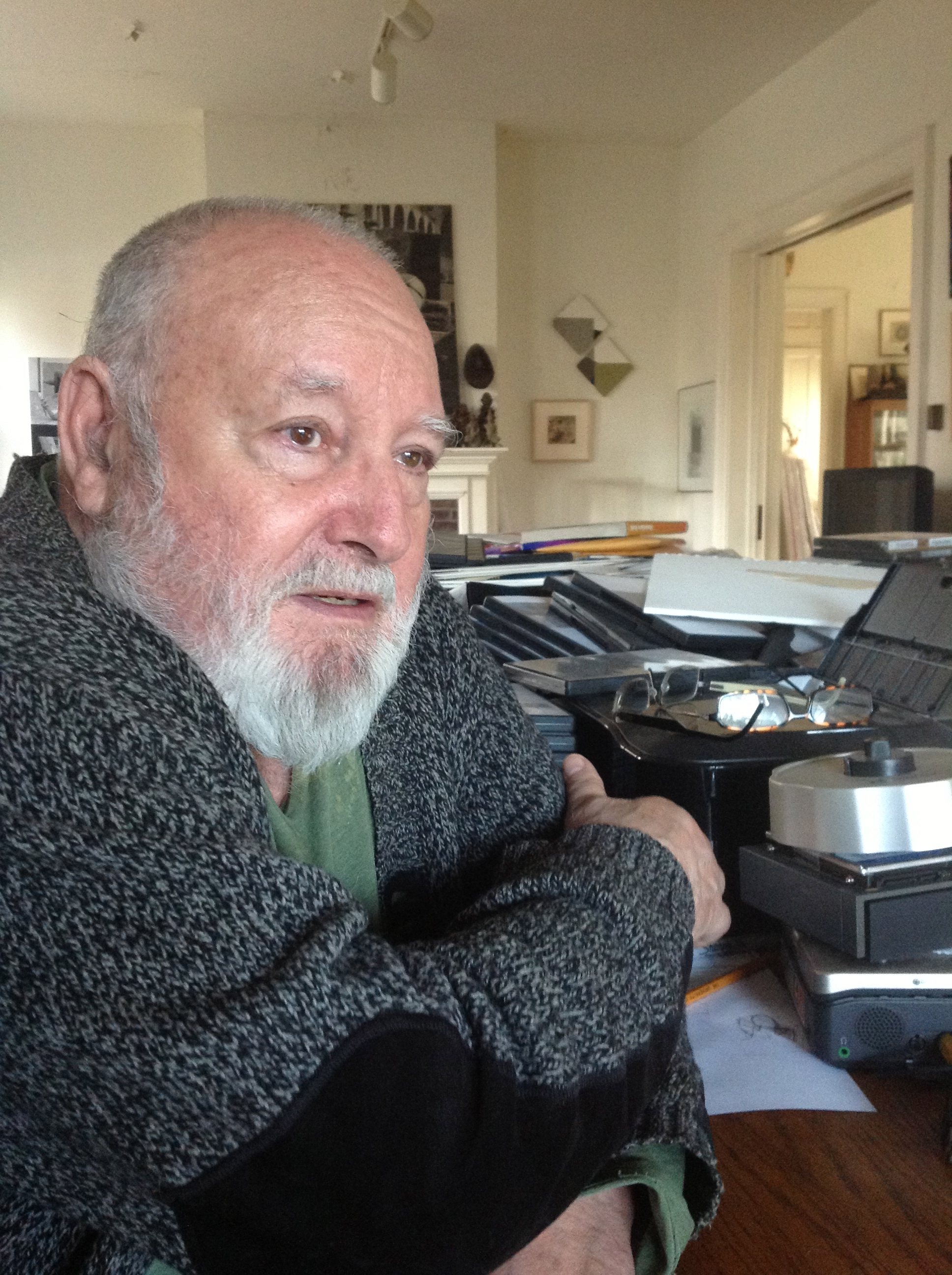
- Hans Breder, 2012
- Born: Hans Dieter Breder; October 20, 1935; Herford, Germany
- Died: June 18, 2017 (aged 81); Iowa City, Iowa, United States
- Education: Hochschule für bildende Künste Hamburg in Hamburg.
- Known for: Intermedia, Sculpture, Painting, Video art
- Spouse: Barbara Welch Breder

Hans Dieter Breder (October 20, 1935 – June 18, 2017) was a German-American interdisciplinary artist. He lived and worked in Iowa.

== Early life ==
Breder studied painting under Willem Grimm at the Hochschule für bildende Künste Hamburg and received a scholarship from the Studienstiftung des deutschen Volkes to study art in New York City in 1964. Once in the U.S. he worked as an assistant to the sculptor George Rickey.

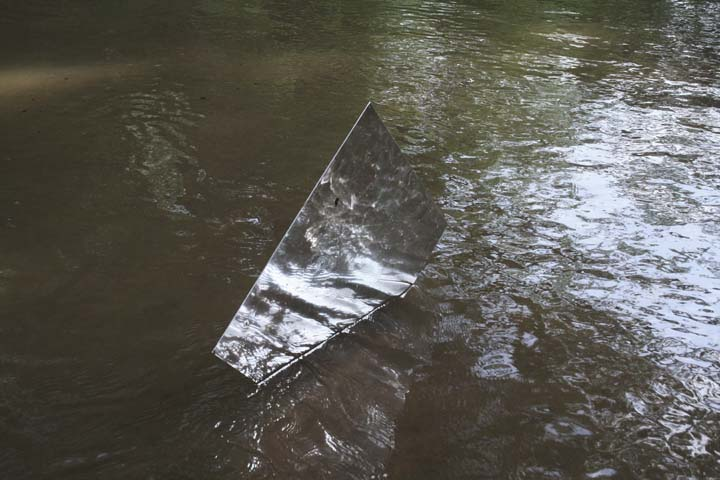
Space-Time (1964) Hans Breder

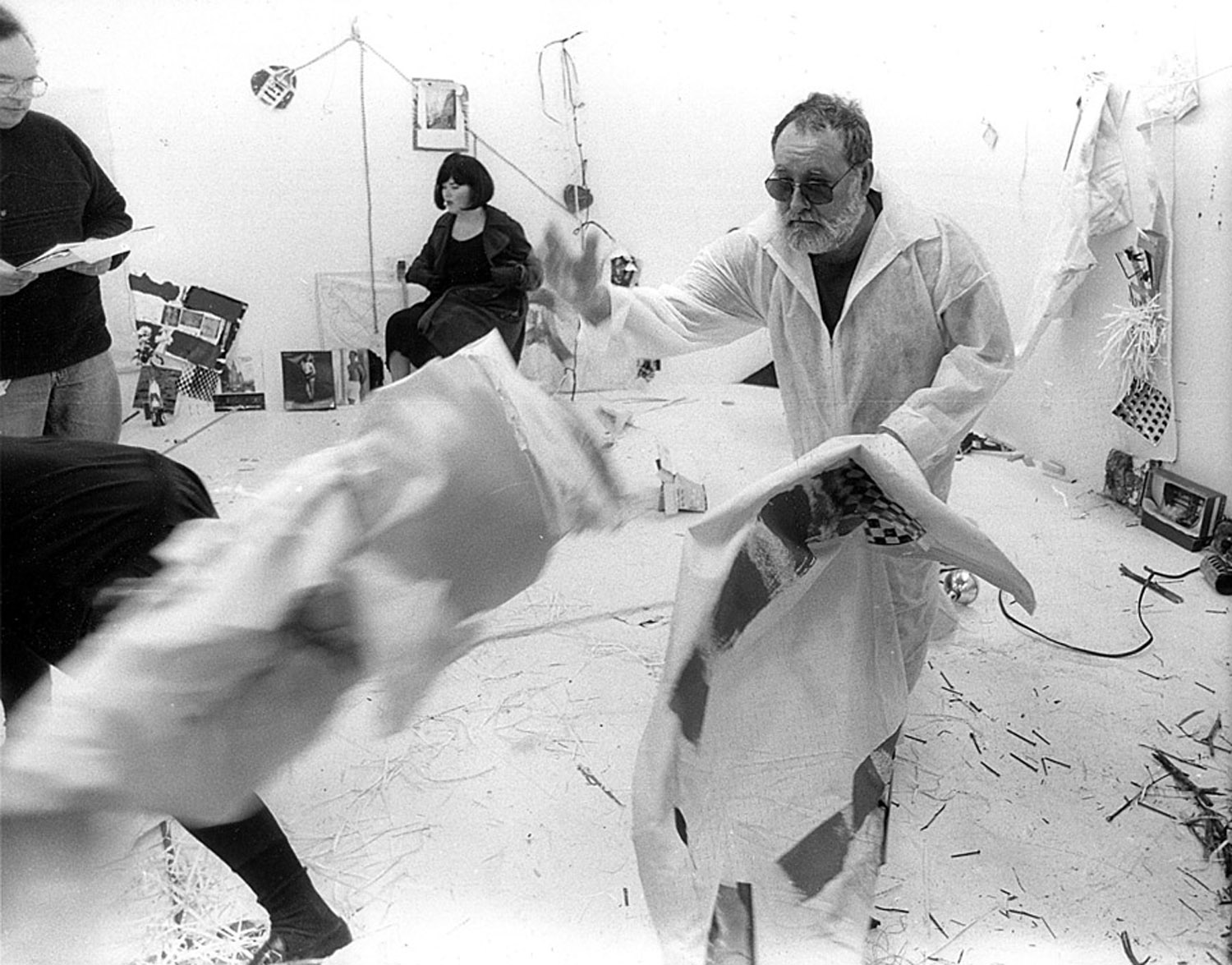
Boxed-In (1993) Intermedia Performance

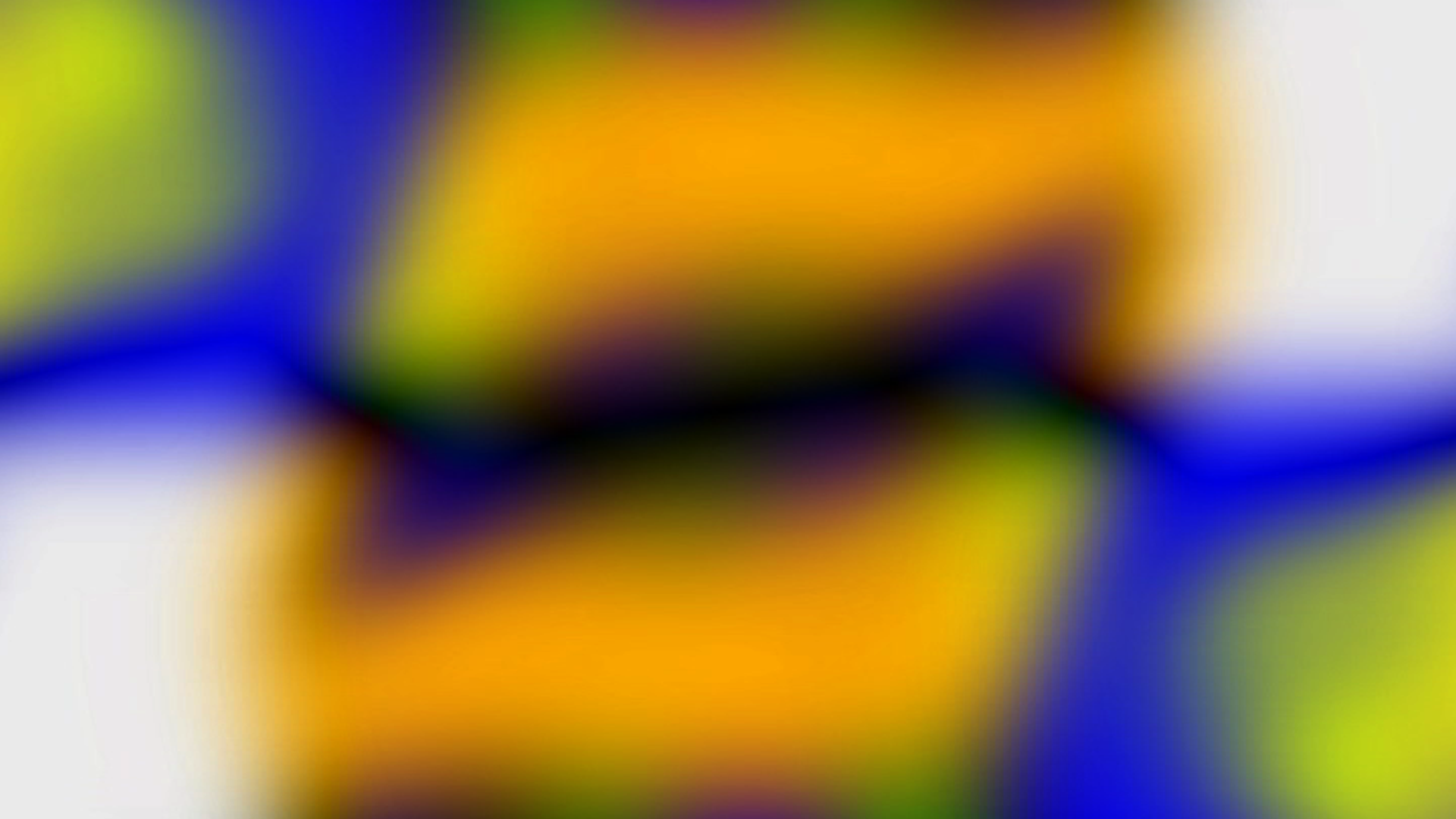
Jetztzeit, video installation still, 2012

== Career ==
Breder taught as an art professor at the University of Iowa from 1966 to 2000. In 1968 he founded the Intermedia program at Iowa, notable alumni include Karen Gunderson (artist) Gunderson was the first person to graduate with a degree in Intermedia in the country under his program in 1968. Gunderson has often said "she didn't think she could have gotten to her way of painting with the black paint if she hadn't learned to think as an intermedia artist." Other artists include Ana Mendieta and Charles Ray. Visiting Artists to the program included Hans Haacke, Allan Kaprow, Willoughby Sharp, Robert Wilson, Vito Acconci, Elaine Summers, Nam June Paik, Dennis Oppenheim, Carolee Schneemann, Karen Finley, Ben Vautier, George Kuchar, Yvonne Rainer, Trinh Minh-ha, Donald Kuspit, Roselee Goldberg, John Hanhardt, Barbara London, and many others. Breder received an Honorary Doctorate from the Technische Universität Dortmund in 2007 and retired as F. Wendell Miller Distinguished Emeritus Professor of Art in 2000.

== Intermedia Program ==
In an effort to create a position opposed to increased specialization and limited interdisciplinary experience, Breder proposed the Intermedia Program in the School of Art and Art History at the University of Iowa in 1967–1968 and it was approved in 1968. The focus was to be artist-oriented rather than art-oriented, in order to emphasize the belief that artistic creativity is a continual challenge. Therefore, intentionally, "no overall intermedia 'style' or philosophy is created."

"My program conceived of intermedia not as interdisciplinary fusing of different fields into one, but as a constant collision of concepts and disciplines. It was performance-oriented, and video was an inherent aspect. Although initially used in a documentary mode, video almost immediately became an integral aspect of many student performances and was soon used as a medium in its own right."

Breder further explained his intermedia concept in the September, 2012 issue of Artforum: "..Digital technology allows me to excavate new worlds of microcosmic event horizons. in Herodias, 2011, I aim for a dematerialization of content by entering into the microstructure of sound and imagery; I seek the immaterial or what in physics people speak of as ephemeral phenomena that cannot be reduced to mere things. The radically microcosmic experience creates an effect that is at once both abstract and real."

== Exhibitions ==
Breder's works have been presented in numerous exhibitions in the United States and internationally. He was exhibited with the Richard Feigen Gallery (1967-1972), the Mitchell Algus Gallery, and Hachmeister Gallery. He was included in Kineticism: System Sculpture in Environmental situations, (Official Olympic Games Exhibition), University Museum of Arts and Science, Mexico City, Mexico (1968); Painting Beyond the Death of Painting: Imagistic and Abstract Work, the first group exhibition of American Art at Kuznetzky Most Exhibition Hall, Moscow, USSR (1989); An American Odyssey 1945/1980, Circolo de Bellas Artes, Madrid, Spain (2004); Ana Mendieta and Hans Breder: Converge, Lelong Galerie, New York (2008), Mind's Mirror', Ethan Cohen Gallery, New York (2014), ...Inmixing: A Survey of Works from 1964 to Present, WhiteBox, New York (2009-2010), Kollisions Felder (Collision Fields), Museum Ostwall, Dortmund, Germany (2013). He was a participant in the Whitney Biennial Exhibition in 1987, 1989, and 1991. Among the institutions his work has been collected by are the Hirshhorn Museum and Sculpture Garden, Washington, D.C.; the Whitney Museum of American Art, New York City; the Walker Art Center, Minneapolis. the National Gallery of Art, Washington, D.C. His Intermedia Archive is installed permanently at the Museum Ostwall, Dortmund, Germany.

== Personal life ==
During the 1970s, Breder had a personal and artistic relationship with Ana Mendieta, who studied in the Intermedia Program he founded at the University of Iowa. Art historian Julia P. Herzberg describes Breder as Mendieta's "companion, confidant, and mentor", whose influence encouraged her interest in performance, conceptual art, and multimedia work. Mendieta spent numerous summers in Mexico during this period, where she experienced important developments in her work. Breder sometimes assisted with and documented her work. Robert Katz describes an early performance in Oaxaca in which Breder, following Mendieta's instructions, helped arrange a sheet around her body and photographed the resulting work with a 35 mm camera.

Since 1984, Breder was married to Barbara Welch Breder who lectured on the critical history of advertising and consumer culture in the University of Iowa's Department of Communication Studies for nearly three decades. She also created the Iowa City Yoga Center (1975–2000).

Breder died in Iowa City, Iowa on June 18, 2017.
