= Sarah Beth Goncarova =

American artist

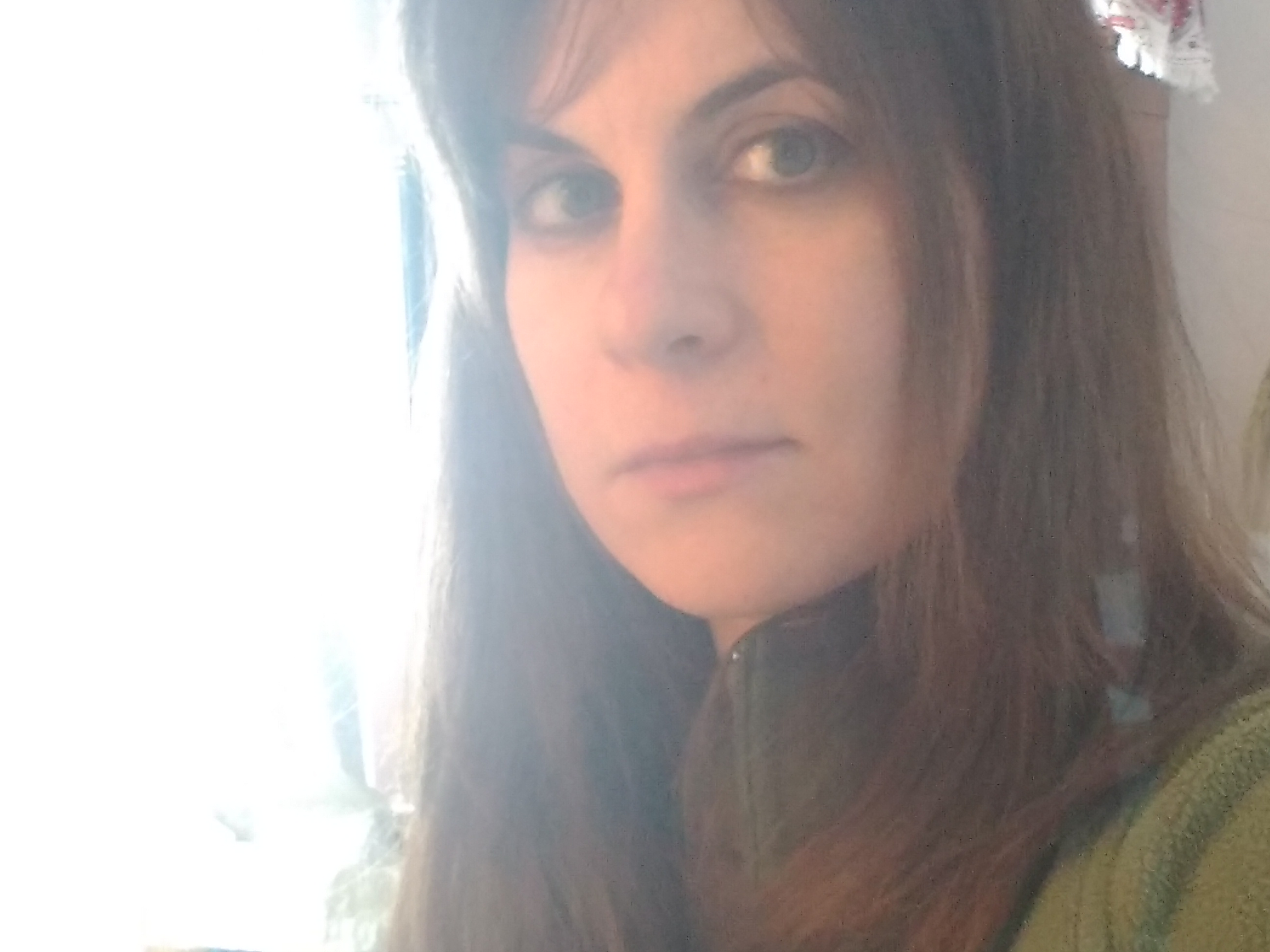
- Born: United States
- Education: University of Maryland School of Architecture; Virginia Commonwealth University School of the Arts; University of Oregon
- Known for: Sculpture; Painting; Installation art Writing
- Movement: Contemporary; Feminist art

Sarah Beth Goncarova (born 1980) is an American writer, composer, and visual artist known for environmental experiential light-sound installations, poetry, children's adventure novels, and writing for film and television.

== Early personal life ==
Sarah Beth Goncarova was born in 1980. Her father was an environmental scientist and her mother, an art teacher. At an early age she studied to play the piano and later reported experiencing chromesthesia, saying "when I would listen to music, I would visualize sinuous colorful shapes in space." She performed with the Alexandria Symphony Orchestra at an early age, with her public debut at age nine. Kim Allen Kluge conducted that debut, and Andre Watts loaned Goncarova his personal piano for the performance. Goncarova graduated from Virginia Commonwealth University School of the Arts, receiving a Bachelor of Fine Art in Sculpture. She received her master's degree in architecture from the Maryland School of Architecture.

== Career ==
Goncarova incorporated plaster, fibers, and ink, and devoted herself full-time to these works, with a small exhibition in San Francisco in December 2006, and a solo show in Palo Alto, California in October 2007.

By 2008 her paintings were primarily portraits, landscapes, and still lives. She then embarked on The Wake Project in 2009, where seemingly calm landscapes belie underlying disasters. For example, Lighter Fluid depicts a vibrant seascape, where the bright ripples in the water are the result of an oil spill. Her solo exhibition Lush/Bleak occurred during the summer of 2009, and in the Blue Planet group show at San Francisco's SOMArts Cultural Center Gallery. She also began exhibiting in shows with feminist themes during this time, including the Control show juried by Guerrilla Girls West, and Reversing the Gaze: Man As Object.

Goncarova returned to minimalist and purely abstract paintings in her Rainy Season, Dawn, Night Spin and Cosmos series in 2010–2011, which showed at galleries including New Haven's John Slade Ely Center for Contemporary Art. In 2011, her larger than life work "Hunks of Burnin’Love" was selected by the curator of painting and sculpture at the San Francisco Museum of Modern Art for exhibition at the Sanchez Arts Center in Pacifica, California.

In 2012 she created a series of large-scale sculptural installations, working with textiles, called Keeping Time With Needle and Thread. This allowed her to resume sculpting while continuing using feminist themes, referencing cloth, sewing, and needlecraft as "women's work," while avoiding any literalism in pictorial work. These made their public debut at Gallery 195 in New Haven, and have been also exhibited at the Whitney Center, the Kehler-Liddell Gallery, and the A.I.R. Gallery in Brooklyn. The Hiestand Galleries of Miami University selected the large-scale piece "May–June (2012)" from this series for their Young Sculptors' Exhibition of 2013 as part of her nomination for the prestigious William and Dorothy Yeck Award. In 2013, Goncarova received grants from the Barbara Deming Memorial Fund and from the Puffin Foundation for her textile-sculptures.

In August 2013, Goncarova won sponsorship from Artspire, a program of the New York Foundation for the Arts, for the continuation of her series Keeping Time with Needle and Thread, in which she furthers her exploration of the definitions of sculpture, combining needle-crafts, sculpture, sound and performance art.

== Writing ==
In 2012 Goncarova co-authored and edited Sonia's Song, Sonia Korn-Grimani's World War II and post-war memoir.
