= Roedde House Museum =

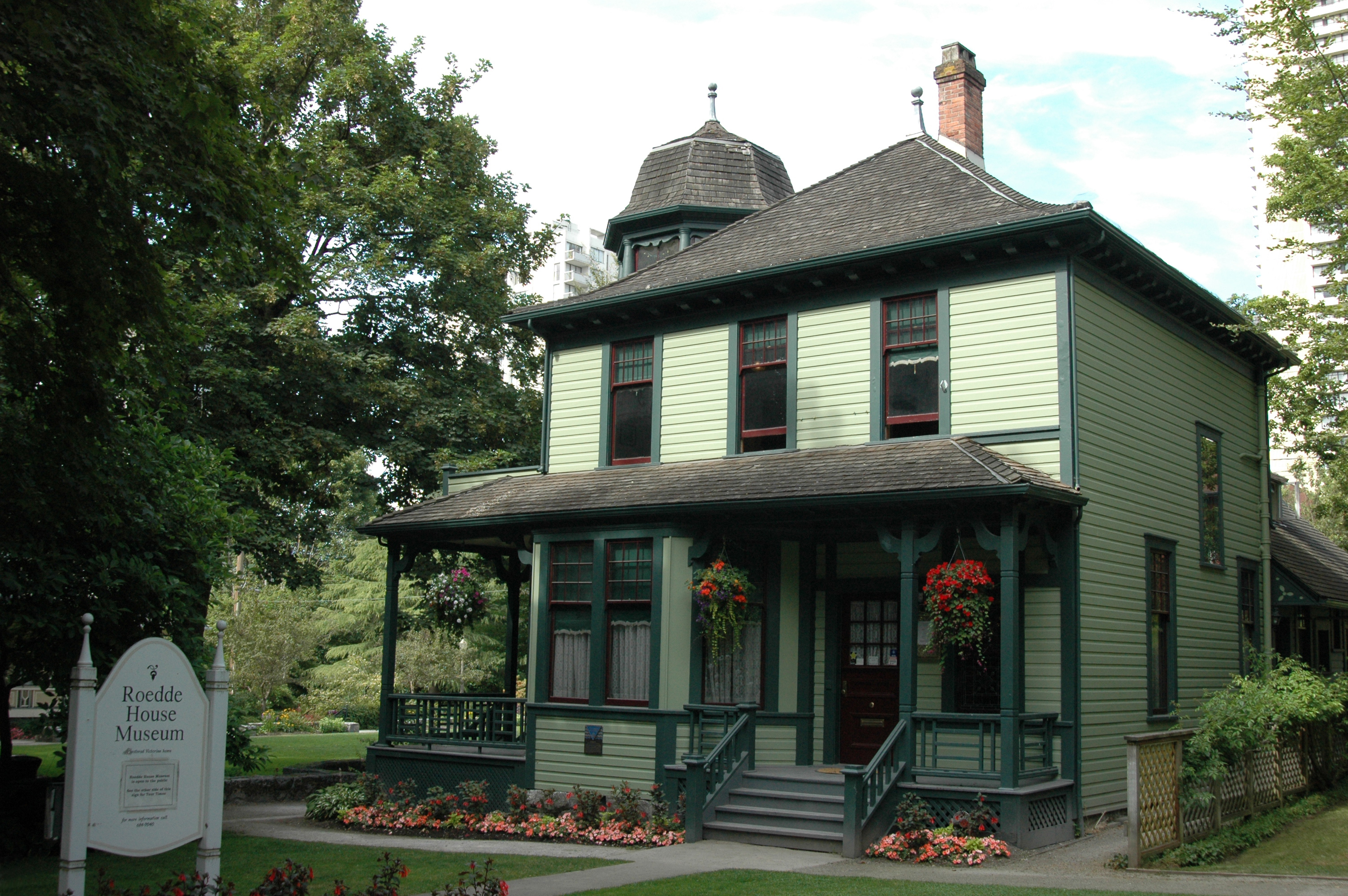
- Exterior of the museum
- Established: May 12, 1990; 36 years ago (Note: The following date was when the museum was opened to the public. The house was built in 1893.)
- Location: 1415 Barclay Street Vancouver, British Columbia, Canada
- Coordinates: 49.2869°N 123.1322°W
- Type: Museum (Victorian era)
- Website: http://www.roeddehouse.org/en/

The Roedde House Museum is a late-Victorian home located at 1415 Barclay Street in Vancouver, Canada. It was the home of Gustav Roedde and his family. The house was built in 1893 and was allegedly designed by architect Francis Rattenbury in the Queen Anne Revival style. After having been a rooming house for years, the house was restored and refurnished in the 1980s and has been open to the public as a museum since 1990.

== History ==
=== Roedde's family home ===
Gustav Roedde (1860-1930) emigrated from Grossbodungen, Germany to Cleveland, US in 1882 where he completed his apprenticeship as a bookbinder. During a Halloween party, he met Matilda Cassebohm (1862-1951), who emigrated from the island of Helgoland, Germany. The two were married in Cleveland in 1883. Together they lived in different cities; San Francisco, California and Victoria, British Columbia, before settling down in Vancouver, British Columbia in 1888. Gustav Roedde's bookbindery blossomed along with Vancouver's quick development. His skills, such as the paper marbling technique, made him a successful businessman. The company continues to operate as G.A. Roedde Printers under new ownership.

Roedde's family home was completed in 1893. The house's alleged architect, Francis Rattenbury (1867-1935), was an ambitious English immigrant. He also designed The Empress Hotel and Vancouver's 1910 provincial courthouse (currently the Vancouver Art Gallery). The Roedde House's asymmetrical plans, verandas and turret are all features of the Queen Anne Revival style. Both the interior and exterior of the house are made of cedar and fir, due to the cheap availability of lumber at the time.

The family grew to include seven children and three St. Bernard dogs. The family's first born, Anna Henrietta died at age four after eating poisoned berries. When World War I began, the sons Walter Herman Widemann (adopted) and William August travelled to Europe to fight for the British army and returned safely. During that time, daughter Emma Cather moved back to the Roedde House with her two daughters, Emma Gwendolyn and Kathleen Frances. Stories have been passed down, that the children used to play in the upstairs storage room to hear the adults’ conversations on the lower floor. In 1925, daughter Anna Catherine was killed at age 28, while on duty as a nurse at the Vancouver General Hospital. During the same year, the family moved to a new home on Drummond Drive, in Point Grey.

=== Preservation and museum ===
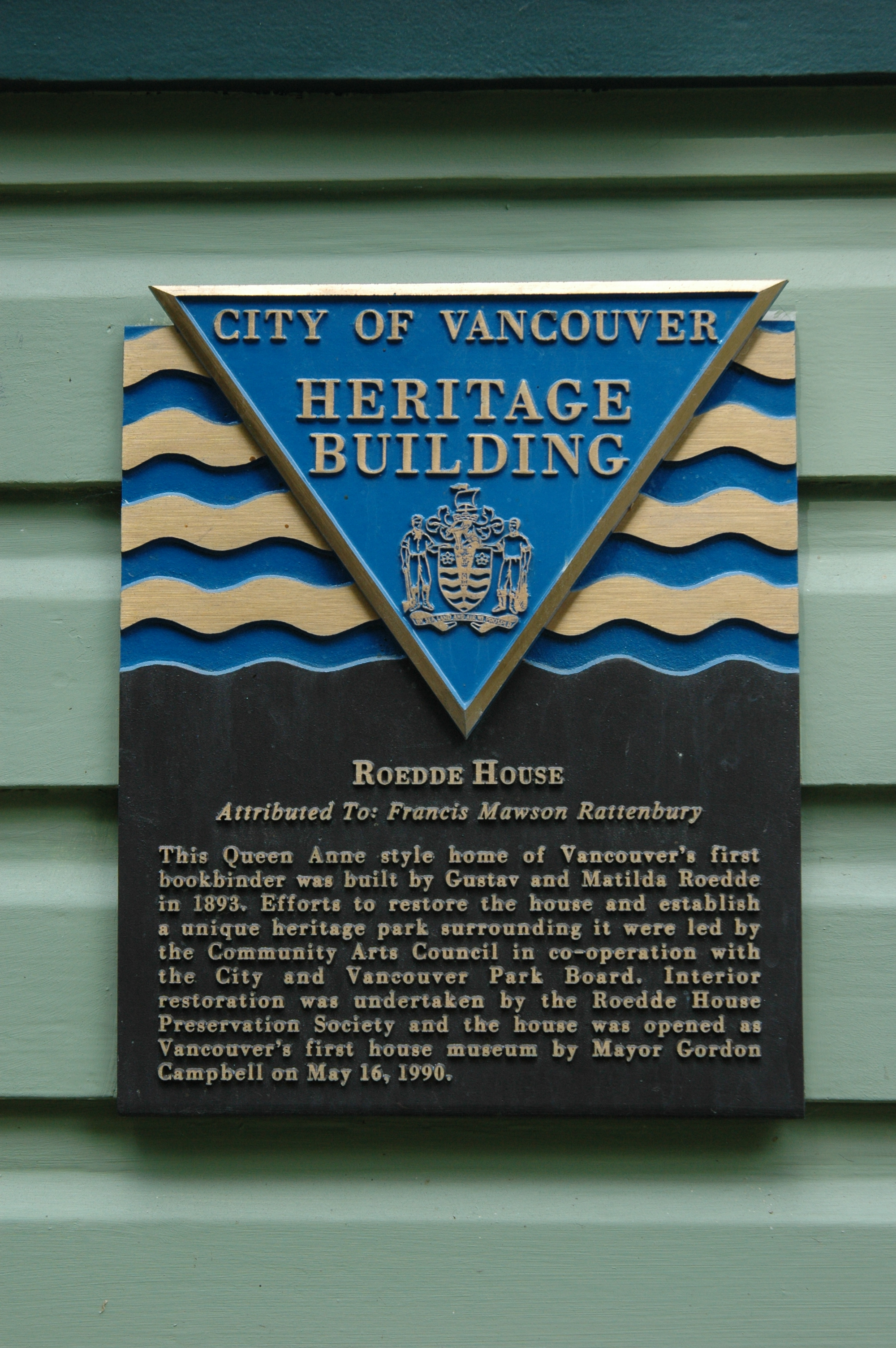
Heritage building plaque on Roedde House. Roedde House was named a Class-A Heritage Building in 1970 by the City of Vancouver.

In the late 1970s, the house was at risk of being demolished. The Community of Arts Council of Vancouver urged that the building not be torn down due to its historical significance. They succeeded and the house was designated a “Class A Heritage Building” in 1976, which meant that the house could not be moved, nor the exterior walls changed. The City of Vancouver restored the exterior of the house. In 1984, the Roedde House Preservation Society was formed to implement the interior restoration. Historical records were used to insure the house replicated what it would have looked like between 1893 and 1925. Stripping down wallpaper helped discover the original colours of the walls and the house was furnished with all the accoutrements of middle-class life in the 1890s.

On May 12, 1990, the Roedde House Museum was officially opened by then-Mayor Gordon Campbell.

== Museum operations ==
The museum's collection of over 2,700 artifacts includes furniture, clothing, books and household items; some of which were owned by the Roedde family. Highlights include, the George III longcase clock manufactured in 1775, the upright Steinway piano dated 1893 and other interesting items like the stereoscope, the chestnut roaster and the universal bread maker.

In addition to guided tours, the museum features Classical and Jazz Concert series. On Sunday Tea and Tour, the museum serves the “Roedde House Blend”, made especially by the Metropolitan Tea Company for the Museum.
