= Sam Vernon =

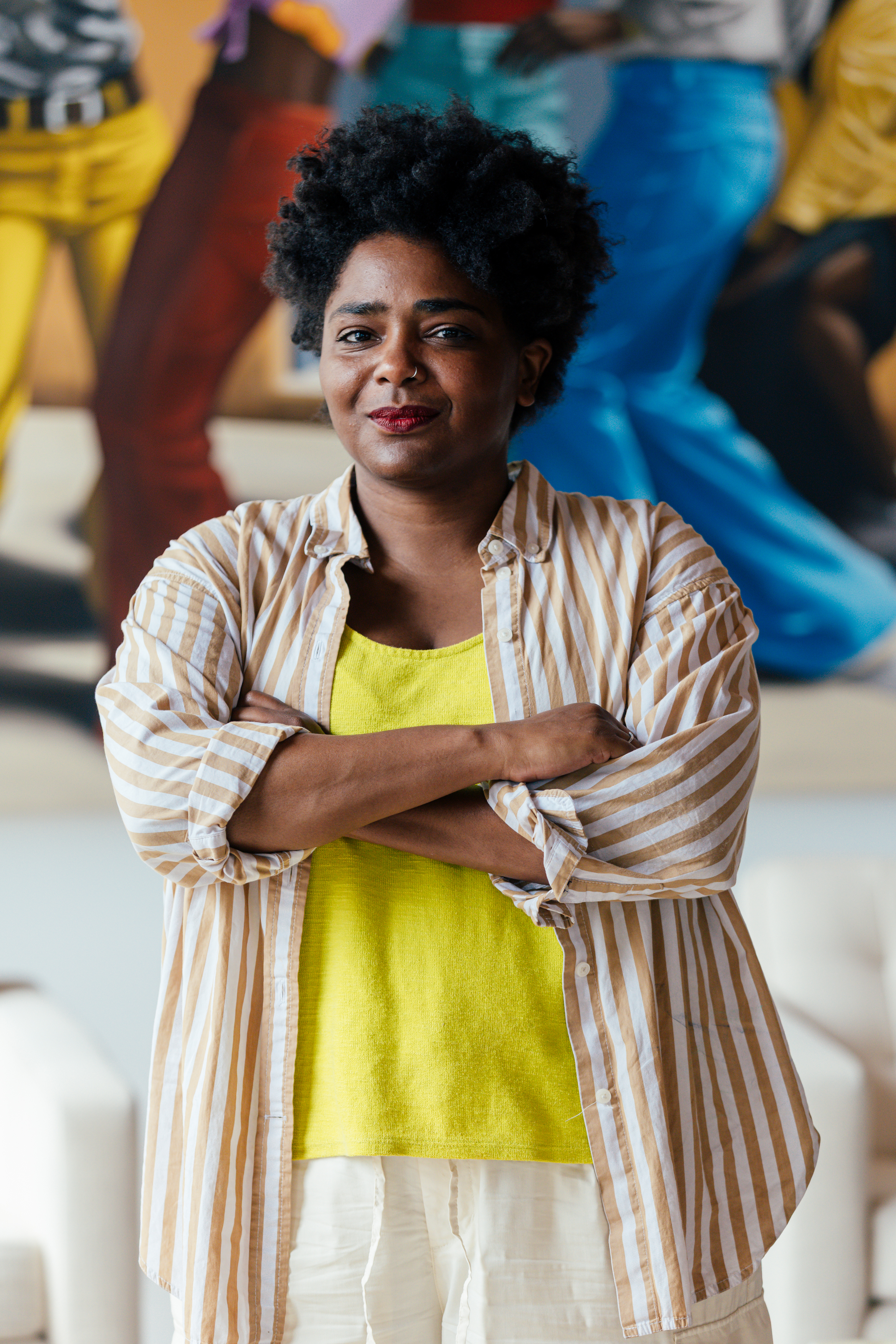
- Born: New York City
- Education: Cooper Union, New York City; Yale University, Connecticut
- Known for: Installations
- Website: samvernon.com

Sam Vernon (born 1987) is an installation and performance artist. She works in various media to create her artwork, including sculpture, paintings and photographs. She is interested in "honor[ing] the past while revising historical memory" through works that explore her own personal identity. Several of her art pieces also convey a certain narrative, and this is done through Vernon's various Xerox drawings.

== Early life ==
Sam Vernon was born in Brooklyn, NY and attended Suitland High School.

== Education ==
Sam Vernon earned her BFA from The Cooper Union in 2009 and her MFA in Painting/Printmaking at Yale School of Art in 2015.

== Career ==
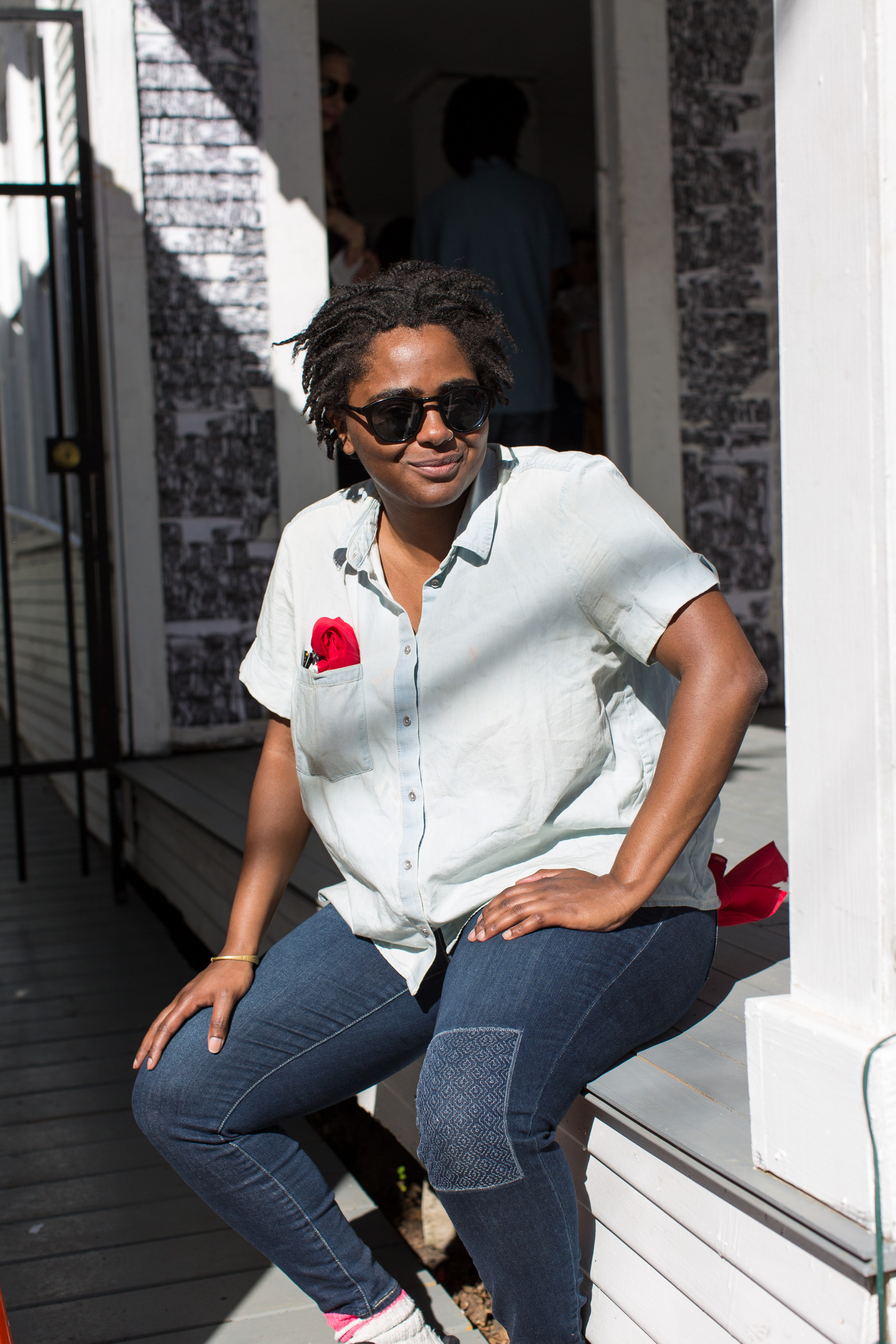
Vernon in 2017

Vernon was included in the 2013 group exhibition Pattern Recognition at MoCADA. In 2016 she presented the large installation How Ghosts Sleep (Seattle) at the Seattle Art Museum in 2016. She contributed to Jeffrey Deitch's 2016 Coney Art Walls project.

In September 2016, Vernon presented the installation Rage Wave in a partner program between Interstitial gallery in Georgetown and the Seattle Office of Arts & Culture. The work was featured in both Interstitial and Seattle Presents gallery. The multimedia piece involved xerox copies of photographs, drawings and writings exploring themes of systematic racism and exploitation in African American history.

Vernon's often large-scale work draws on themes of oppression, nightmares, and memories. Vernon makes drawings, installations, paintings and sculptural components. Her installation and performances evoke African-American history through her exploration of personal narrative and identity.

Vernon is an assistant professor at Pratt Institute, where she teaches drawing.
