= Barbara Zucker =

American artist (born 1940)

- Born: 1940 (age 85–86); Philadelphia, Pennsylvania
- Education: Hunter College
- Known for: Sculpture
- Awards: Giverny Fellowship, Lila Acheson Wallace Foundation, National Endowment for the Arts, Sculpture, The UCross Foundation, Yaddo, National Academy Museum Proctor Award.

Barbara M. Zucker (born 1940) is an American artist known for her sculpture. As of 2018 she was Professor Emerita, University of Vermont, and based in Burlington, Vermont.

Born in Philadelphia, Zucker received a Bachelor of Science degree at the University of Michigan before receiving a Master of Arts from Hunter College. She has taught at La Guardia Community College; Fordham University; Philadelphia College of Art; the University of Vermont as a professor on the studio art faculty from 1979, being chair of the Department of Art from 1979 to 1985; and Yale University. She has served as an artist-in-residence at Florida State University and Princeton University. Zucker began a series of works based on the shape of chairs in the 1960s; the following decade saw her move into installation art. She has since come to explore fan shapes, and more recently began to create works with motors. She is a National Endowment for the Arts Fellow for 1975, and was awarded a fellowship from Reader's Digest in 1990 to work in Giverny. She has had numerous solo shows, and co-founded the A.I.R. Gallery, the first women's co-operative gallery in the U.S., in New York City in 1972. From 1974 to 1981 she was an editorial assistant at Art News, and she has written for that publication, The Village Voice, Art Journal, and Women's Studies. Her work may be found in numerous private and corporate collections, as well as the Whitney Museum of American Art.

Her image is included in the iconic 1972 poster Some Living American Women Artists by Mary Beth Edelson.
