= SoHo 20 Gallery (painting) =

1974 diptych oil painting by Sylvia Sleigh

SOHO 20 Gallery
- Artist: Sylvia Sleigh
- Year: 1974
- Medium: Oil on two canvases
- Dimensions: 182.9 cm × 243.8 cm (72 in × 96 in)
- Location: University of Missouri–St. Louis

SOHO 20 Gallery is a diptych painting by the Welsh-born American artist Sylvia Sleigh containing portraits of the collective members of the New York art gallery SOHO 20. It is oil on canvas with each panel measuring 72 × 96 inches. Sleigh also created a group portrait of the A.I.R. Gallery members. Carrie Moyer, writing in The Brooklyn Rail, states that the paintings could be "read today like detailed history paintings that record the birth of the Feminist Art Movement". Andrew Hottle notes that "Sleigh borrowed and redefined a format most recognizably used by seventeenth-century Dutch artists, such as Frans Hals and Rembrandt, for portraits of militia groups, regents, and observers of anatomy lessons."

In 2019, SOHO 20 Gallery was included in the exhibition Women Defining Themselves: The Original Artists of SOHO 20 at Rowan University Art Gallery in Glassboro, New Jersey. Forty-five years after the painting was made, five of the women represented (Elena Borstein, Marge Helenchild, Cynthia Mailman, Rosalind Shaffer, and Sharon Wybrants) were photographed in front of Sleigh's diptych at the opening reception.

== Members depicted in the painting ==
Identified in Womanart and The Power of Feminist Art

- Elena Borstein
- Barbara Coleman
- Maureen Connor
- May Ann Gillies
- Joan Glueckman
- Eunice Golden
- Marge Helenchild
- Cynthia Mailman
- Marion Ranyak
- Marilyn Raymond
- Rachel Rolon de Clet
- Halina Rusak
- Lucy Salick
- Rosalind Shaffer
- Sylvia Sleigh
- Eileen Spikol
- May Stevens
- Suzanne Weisberg
- Sharon Wybrants
