= Soho20 Chelsea =

Art gallery in New York City

Coordinates: 40.75139°N 74.00421°W

SOHO20 Artists, Inc., known as SOHO20 Gallery, was founded in 1973 by a group of women artists intent on achieving professional excellence in an industry where there was a gross lack of opportunities for women to succeed. SOHO20 was one of the first galleries in Manhattan to showcase the work of an all-woman membership and most of the members joined the organization as emerging artists. These artists were provided with exhibition opportunities that they could not find elsewhere.

== 1973—1981 ==
SOHO20 was founded by two artists, Joan Glueckman and Mary Ann Gillies, who modeled SOHO20 after A.I.R. Gallery (est. 1972), the first all-women cooperative art gallery in New York City. While attending a meeting of Women Artists in Revolution (WAR) in late 1972, Glueckman and Gillies met Agnes Denes, who told them about A.I.R. Gallery and encouraged them to establish another all-women cooperative exhibition venue, citing "much need for women's galleries." Marilyn Raymond, a businesswoman and friend of Glueckman's, handled the business matters while Glueckman and Gillies looked for artists to join the gallery. A cooperative structure was chosen for financial reasons. The name of the gallery was derived from its location at 99 Spring Street in the Manhattan neighborhood of Soho (formatted entirely in uppercase as SOHO) and an anticipated 20 artist-members.

According to the original press release, "In keeping with the feminist ideal of women defining themselves, the criterion for membership is professional excellence without restriction of style, medium, or theme." From the outset, the artist-members reflected a diversity of styles, subjects, and mediums. In addition to Glueckman and Gillies, the original members were Elena Borstein, Barbara Coleman, Maureen Connor, Eunice Golden, Marge Helenchild, Cynthia Mailman, Marion Ranyak, Rachel Rolon de Clet, Halina Rusak, Lucy Sallick, Morgan Sanders, Rosalind Shaffer, Sylvia Sleigh, Eileen Spikol, May Stevens, Suzanne Weisberg, and Sharon Wybrants. In order to give every member an opportunity to exhibit, the gallery initially held two concurrent solo shows at a time. The premiere exhibitions in October 1973 featured works by Sylvia Sleigh, who exhibited The Turkish Bath (1973) and several other paintings, and Maureen Connor, who showed a group of giant "breathing flowers" that alternately inflated and deflated. After the 1973–74 exhibition season, Sleigh, Helenchild, Stevens, and Weisberg left the gallery. Shirley Gorelick, Kate Resek, and Susan Hoeltzel became members in 1974; Vernita Nemec, C.R. Peck, Diane Churchill, and Noreen Bumby joined SOHO20 in 1975, following the departures of several other artists.

In 1974 Sylvia Sleigh created a portrait of the group.

In 1975, SOHO20 began to hold annual group exhibitions in addition to solo shows by member-artists. Showing Off opened the 1975–76 exhibition season. The art critic John Perreault responded positively to Showing Off, saying that most group shows "are the bane of reviewers" but this was "a fine show far above the level of most such things." In the 1975–76 season, the artists of SOHO20 also arranged their first exchange exhibition with Hera (est. 1974), an all-women cooperative gallery in Wakefield, Rhode Island. The galleries exchanged group shows in an effort to expose viewers to the breadth of women's work. Invitational exhibitions, which tended to reflect a diversity similar to that of the gallery's member-artists, were likewise introduced in 1975 as a "community service" that gave viewers "a broad new look at new talent."

== 1982—1996 ==
In 1982, SOHO20 moved to a new space at 469 Broome Street, another location in Soho. The gallery obtained legal, non-profit 501(c)(3) status in 1989, which made it possible for SOHO20 to receive funding from the New York State Council on the Arts for two multi-year exhibition series, Ageless Perceptions and Emerging Women Artists. Drawing attention to the work of mature women, each Ageless Perceptions exhibition highlighted several artists, including Lil Picard, Esther Gentle, Dorothy Dehner, Sari Dienes, and Jane Teller. Also added to the schedule were guest-curated exhibitions, such as New Visions (1986-87), a show of works by four artists who had no gallery affiliation, including Lorna Simpson.

During the 1980s, favorable reviews of artist-members were featured in The New York Times and mainstream art periodicals. A group of sublime drawings by Eve Ingalls, inspired by summers spent in the Idaho wilderness, were recognized for their combination of calligraphic, east Asian art forms and an empirical sensibility. Martha Edelheit's miniature sculpted "fliers," frozen in daring acrobatic poses, were praised for their "feeling of power tempered by sensuous grace." In her paintings of fields in upstate New York and Nova Scotia, Marion Ranyak's artistic touch was described as being "delicate as a bird" while the light in her works was "always at that point of gray heat that sets everything in a landscape in motion." Nancy Azara, Harriet Mishkin, and Linda Cunningham were also reviewed positively.

At the time, SOHO20 also placed greater emphasis on exhibitions that exposed relevant social and political issues. In 1985, Private Gone Public attempted to reveal how artists "formulate a private view of life, environment, the world, into a comprehensible visual symbology." The exhibition included works by May Stevens, Howardena Pindell, Sue Coe, Erika Rothenberg, Nancy Spero, and Bonnie Lucas—"six 'gut issue' artists," as described by Grace Glueck in The New York Times. In 1989, South African Mail: Messages from Inside consisted of more than 400 works by 200 artists from South Africa, conceived as a form of resistance against apartheid. The exhibition was curated by Janet Goldner with funding from the United Nations Special Committee against Apartheid. An exhibition in 1990, curated by Faith Ringgold, was made as a tribute to the civil rights workers killed in Mississippi in 1964, and featured works by six African-American women artists, including Beverly Buchanan, Joyce J. Scott, and Clarissa Sligh. SOHO20 was also among the many arts organizations that responded to concerns over censorship and attempts to defund the National Endowment for the Arts in 1989, which followed the widely publicized controversies around exhibitions of works by Andres Serrano and Robert Mapplethorpe. Blacklisted/Whitewashed/Red Handed (1990) addressed issues of censorship, funding restrictions, and First Amendment to the United States Constitution rights through the works of SOHO20 artists and artist-interns from Washington Irving High School. Also in 1990, SOHO20 partnered with the Organization of Pan Asian American Women to present an art auction of works by Asian artists to benefit the New York Asian Women's Center (now known as Womankind), which serves the survivors of human trafficking, sexual and domestic violence, and later-in-life abuse. In 1994, SOHO20 hosted an invitational exhibition called Effect or Infect: Art and Ecology, which addressed the state of world ecology.

== 1996—2015 ==
In 1996, SOHO20 moved to a third location at 545 Broadway, and then relocated for the fourth time to 511 West 25th Street in Chelsea in 2001. SOHO20 also began to invite literary artists for readings, and hosted events led by the organization Artists Talk on Art between 2003 and 2010. In 2007, the gallery organized an all-media juried exhibition, Adam's Rib, Eve's Air in Her Hair, which explored the many manifestations of Eve, including Lilith, to whom the second part of the exhibition title refers. SOHO20 hosted its first all-woman video show in 2008, followed by various film screenings.

In late 2009, the gallery relocated to its fifth location on West 27th Street. An exhibition of talks and dialogues called INTERNATIONAL FOCUS-Women in Crisis (2010) dealt with human rights issues such as sex trafficking, child soldiers, and genital mutilation; it later continued under the name CONVERSATIONS, with experts speaking on a variety of topics including "Voices of Muslim Women." The series continued with "What’s Old is New Again: The Legacy of the Feminist Art Movement of the 70s" (2010) and "Louise Nevelson: Empress of Environmental Sculpture" (2013). Another project, "Savoir-Faire," began in 2009 as a platform for women performance artists to realize projects that had not been seen previously. Implemented around the same time were the Artist Studio Residency Program and "SIGHT unSEEN," an ongoing series of gallery tours through the Chelsea arts district, led by guest curators, writers, and artists.

== 2015—present ==
After 42 years in Manhattan, SOHO20 relocated to the Brooklyn neighborhood of Bushwick in August 2015; its informal, site-specific name—SOHO20 Chelsea—reverted to SOHO20 Gallery. As of July 2019, the gallery left its location in Brooklyn and programming went "on temporary hiatus."

== Current and past artist-members ==
- Nancy Azara
- Elizabeth Bisbing
- Vivian E. Browne
- Fran Bull
- Maureen Connor
- Eunice Golden
- Martha Edelheit
- Emily Fuller
- Moira Geoffrion
- Nancy Goldring
- Shirley Gorelick
- Lucy Hodgson
- Cynthia Mailman
- Phyllis Mark
- Juanita McNeely
- Vernita Nemec
- Marion Ranyak
- Ann Rowles
- Morgan Sanders
- Karin Schneider
- Sylvia Sleigh
- May Stevens
- Sharon Wybrants
