= Eunice Golden =

American painter (1927–2025)

- Born: Eunice Wiener; February 18, 1927; New York City, U.S.
- Died: April 3, 2025 (aged 98); East Hampton, New York, U.S.
- Known for: Painting, photography, filmmaking
- Movement: Figurative art, feminist art

Eunice Golden (née Wiener; February 18, 1927 – April 3, 2025) was an American feminist painter from New York City, known for exploring sexuality using the male nude. Her work has been shown at the Whitney Museum of American Art, Brooklyn Museum, Bronx Museum of the Arts, Westbeth Gallery, and SOHO20 Gallery. She died on April 3, 2025, at the age of 98.

== Early life, education, and political involvement ==
Eunice Golden's father, Samuel Wiener, fled Russia after a pogrom. Her mother, Jean (née Gurtov) Wiener, was the American-born daughter of Russian immigrants. Eunice Wiener was born and raised in Brooklyn, New York. Golden studied psychology at the University of Wisconsin before leaving school to focus on her art. She rebelled against the patriarchal views of her father and sought "to demystify the male nude and sexuality", as noted by the art historian Gail Levin. Her work paralleled ideas that emerged in women's liberation movement of the late 1960s and early 1970s. In 1971, Golden joined the Ad Hoc Women Artists' Committee (est. 1970), a subgroup of the Art Workers' Coalition that picketed the Whitney Museum of American Art in a series of actions over four months.

In 1973, Golden joined the "Fight Censorship Group," which was organized by Anita Steckel in response to restrictions imposed on the sexually explicit works in Steckel's solo exhibition, The Sexual Politics of Feminist Art (1973), at Rockland Community College. In addition to Steckel and Golden, "Fight Censorship" included Judith Bernstein, Louise Bourgeois, Martha Edelheit, Juanita McNeely, Barbara Nessim, Joan Semmel, and Hannah Wilke. Also in 1973, she was a founding member of the all-women cooperative art gallery SOHO20, where her work was exhibited until 1981.

== Work ==
Golden's paintings in the 1960s and 1970s focused on the male nude as a way to explore sexuality, struggle, and desire. She later explained that her early paintings of the male anatomy were not "heretical" or "revolutionary" but "a stream of consciousness outpouring of emotionally and sensually charged images that reflected who I was: a heterosexual woman with erotic needs and fantasies, yet struggling to redefine myself. ... In retrospect, I saw that I had unwittingly addressed, on a subliminal level, ideologies, experiences, and perceptions of a broad audience."

By the mid-1970s, Golden's feminist position was necessary to understand the larger impact of her erotic work. In particular, her Male Landscapes addressed the "phallacy" of male power as Golden's voyeuristic role reversed the erotic gaze from the long-established notion of the male as viewer and female as sexualized object. The art critic Peter Frank recognized the "visual power" her Male Landscapes as "quite compelling." In 1977, her Landscape #160 was included in Nothing But Nudes, an exhibition at the Whitney Museum of American Art, and was praised in Art International by Carter Ratcliff.

In 1973, Golden began to explore performance, body-art, photography and film. Her group of films, Blue Bananas and Other Meats (1973), extends the painted Male Landscapes into performances in which the male body is covered with an assortment of foods, much like the Spring Banquet by the Surrealist artist Meret Oppenheim.

In the 1980s, her work focused on portraits and satiric anthropomorphic studies. In the 1990s she completed her Swimmers series, which was centered around the closeness of mother and child. Golden's work was included in the 2022 exhibition Women Painting Women at the Modern Art Museum of Fort Worth.

== Publications ==
- Golden, Eunice; Kenny, Kay (Spring-Summer 1982). "Sexuality in Art: Two Decades from a Feminist Perspective." Woman's Art Journal 3 (1): 14–15.
- Golden, Eunice (Spring 1981). "The Male Nude in Women’s Art—Dialectics of a Feminist Iconography." Heresies #12, 3 (4): 40–42.
- Golden, Eunice (May–June 1975). "On the Censorship of Phallic Imagery." Artworkers News. p. 3.
- Golden, Eunice (April 1967). "On the Business of Art." Artworkers News. p. 26.
