= Anita Steckel =

American feminist artist (1930–2012)

- Born: Anita Arkin; February 24, 1930; Brooklyn, New York, United States
- Died: March 16, 2012 (aged 82); Manhattan, New York, United States
- Education: Art Students League of New York
- Known for: Painting and Photomontage
- Awards: Pollock Krasner Grant (2005)

Anita Steckel (née Arkin; February 24, 1930 – March 16, 2012) was an American feminist artist known for paintings and photomontages with sexual imagery. She was also the founder of the arts organization "The Fight Censorship Group", whose other members included Hannah Wilke, Louise Bourgeois, Judith Bernstein, Martha Edelheit, Eunice Golden, Juanita McNeely, Barbara Nessim, Anne Sharpe and Joan Semmel.

== Early life and education ==
Steckel was born in Brooklyn, New York, to Russian Jewish immigrants Dora and Hyman Arkin. Her mother was reportedly abusive and her father was a gambler. She left home after an early graduation from the High School of Music & Art in Manhattan (now Fiorello H. LaGuardia High School of Music & Art). As a single young woman, Steckel dated Marlon Brando and worked on a Norwegian freighter that traveled to South America for two months. She also worked as a dancing instructor, where she won a competition and was crowned the "Mambo Queen of Southern California". She then went back to New York to study at Cooper Union, and Alfred University, as well as completing advanced study at the Art Students League of New York with Edwin Dickinson She also taught for several years at The Art Students League of New York. She worked and lived most of her time in a studio in Greenwich Village. In 1970, Steckel moved to the Westbeth Artists' Housing in Manhattan, New York, where she lived the rest of her life.

== Artwork ==
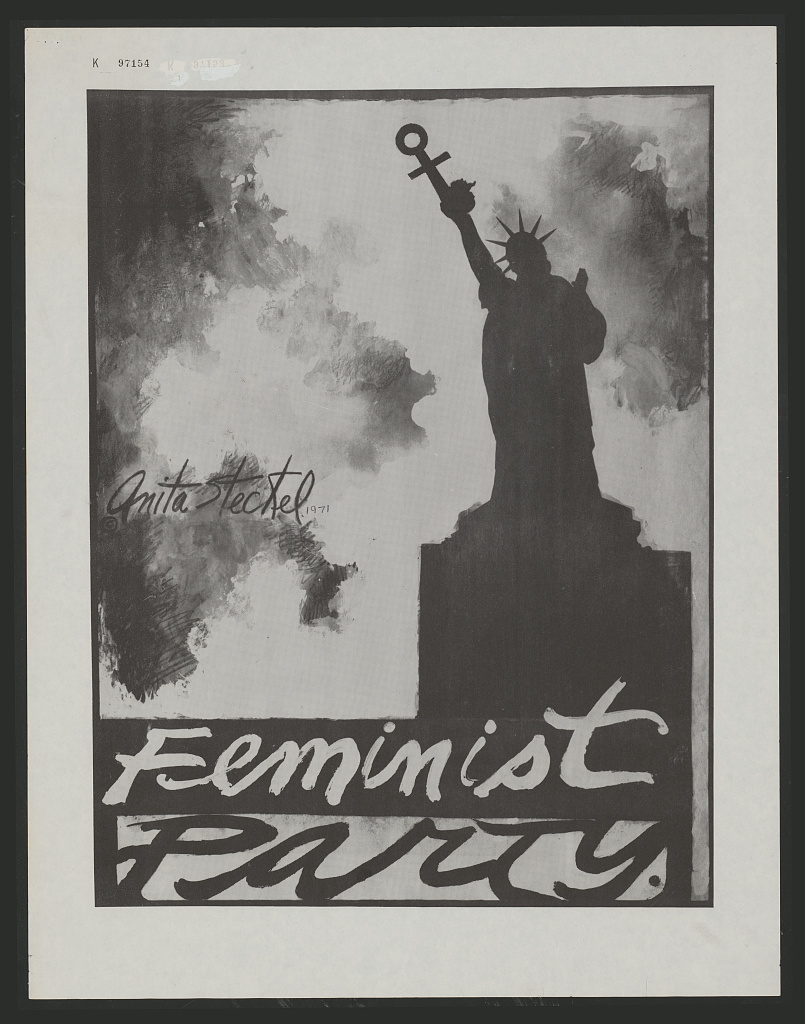
"Feminist Party" poster. 1971

Steckel began showing her work in both solo and group exhibitions beginning in the late 1960s. Her first publicly recognized work, a photomontage series titled "Mom Art" in 1963, included critiques of racism, war, and sexual inequalities. In her "Giant Woman" series of works, Steckel painted oversized nude women onto photographs of city scenes, an idea associated with a Women's movement theme that women had "outgrown their roles" in society as previously defined. In 1972, her work was exhibited at the Women's Interart Center in New York alongside pieces by the influential feminist artists Judy Chicago, Miriam Schapiro and Faith Ringgold.

Steckel came to public attention after her solo exhibition, The Sexual Politics of Feminist Art, held at Rockland Community College in 1972. The exhibition was controversial because Steckel's work was sexually explicit and some local authorities called for the closure of the show, or at least to move it to a "more appropriate venue", such as the men or women's restroom. She later explained that the Giant Women Series photomontages were a response to what she felt, that "men seemed to own the city." In The New York Skyline series a mother feeds her muscle-man son sperm and tells him to "Eat your power honey before it grows cold."

She created a series of artworks concerning erections, in defense of which she said, “If the erect penis is not wholesome enough to go into museums, it should not be considered wholesome enough to go into women. And if it’s wholesome enough to go into women, it’s wholesome enough to go into museums.” The political content of her art was not limited to feminism, extending to larger issues of justice, and she explained that "When you come from a culture that has been the underdog in a very brutal way, you tend to speak out against injustice." Her immigrant parents were not religiously observant, but Jewish culture was part of her childhood experience, and the content of her adult art contains these cultural references. In Skylines of New York the Hudson River is filled with gefilte fish and Hitler "is depicted as a patriarchal menace with his throat being sliced by a nude female figure wielding an ax between her legs."

She also made a piece titled “Subway” in 1973 which, to quote Richard Meyer of Artforum magazine, “The work was based on Steckel’s memories of men exposing themselves on the subway when she was a young woman riding from her parents’ home in Brooklyn to school in Manhattan. Here, her exposure lays claim to the men’s implicit assertion of power as it reactivates the trauma of witnessing their acts, which she refers to in a line of a limerick she wrote: ‘Those sexual shocks every day / Turned me into a difficult lay.’”

In 2001, Steckel's work was exhibited at the Mitchell Algus Gallery.
