= Ce Roser =

American artist (born 1925)

Cecilia Roser (born 1925) is an American artist who has been active in New York City since the 1960s. While studying in Berlin, Roser learned of a female artist named Käthe Kollwitz. Kollwitz, who worked until the day she died, was an inspiration to Roser. Remarking that she would like to live that way too, Roser proceeded to emphasize the need for young artists, especially women, to find a fitting predecessor and mentor.

== Background ==
Roser was born in Philadelphia, Pennsylvania in 1925. Ever since childhood, Roser had been painting and drawing. She studied under the Japanese calligrapher Hidai Nankoku (b. 1912) during his New York City visit. Roser later transferred the experience of rendering abstract characters on paper to painting on canvas. Although the experience with Hidai paid homage to her Asian ancestry, Roser's work does not fall into the East Asian art tradition. According to Peter Townsend, Roser's work seems “oriental only to those who don’t know oriental art.”

In addition to Kollwitz and Hidai, Roser admired Emil Nolde's watercolors and the way Claude Monet transformed nature into paint. Hans Uhlmann, Charmion von Wiegand, and Sari Dienes also served as other mentors for her vivid, lively, and daringly delicate work.

Roser turned 100 in 2025.

== Art ==
Roser has stated that it is for others, not her, to say what tradition her art belongs to; yet many critics categorize her work as abstract. Abstract art focuses on what a person sees: color, shape, size, and scale. It does not directly depict objects in the visible world. Roser's work exemplifies the idea that art is a bridge between the verbal and pre-verbal world, a blending of the reality and perception of life. Roser believes that the “communication of painting can express the architecture, landscape, aerial views, free associations, random choices and unexpected juxtapositions of perceptions and feelings that constitute life experience.” Roser's abstraction and distinct style of purposefully using colors has been described as “suggesting a symbolic language of earth and mountain topography.” That critique continues on to stress that her work is a great example of "perception shifts" and her abstraction is able to “engage the viewer through ambiguity.”

John Russell described her work as “something of the headlong imagery of Kandinsky's early ‘Improvisations’” and referred to her "recognizable images which come and go" with color that is "everywhere light, clear, clean and free." The use of expansive white space helps in her emphasis of crisp clean color which is used with distinct intention so much that Roser is regarded as "very good on the edges of her pictures, too, with plenty of action backed up into the corners." This increase in white space, praised by many critics, came about as a translation of the sunlight that she saw flickering on the Hudson River from her New York studio.

While some critics claim that her work is "best suited for watercolor," Roser's style is bold, vibrant and unintentionally intimate. Her colorful style and broad brush strokes "become abstract elements that float over the picture plane." The organic nature of her paintings reflect a process based on feeling and through the rhythm and underlying harmony, viewers are given a pleasurable experience for the eyes. Roser's work embodies childlike verve and spirited expression while remaining seemingly delicate.

Roser's work is in the collection of the Smithsonian American Art Museum, the Whitney Museum of American Art, and the Metropolitan Museum of Art. Her image is included in the iconic 1972 poster Some Living American Women Artists by Mary Beth Edelson. She is also a member of American Abstract Artists.

== Women in the Arts Foundation (WIA) and Women Choose Women ==
Women in the Arts (WIA) was founded by both Cynthia Navaretta and Ce Roser as a protest against the chauvinism of art galleries. The foundation was created as a solution to the failure of galleries to actively exhibit works by women artists. The Women in the Arts Foundation continues work to overcome discrimination against women artists by providing information that aids women in functioning effectively as professional artists. Since its creation in 1971, WIA has obtained grants from the National Endowment for the Arts, Exxon Corporation, Mobil Foundation, the Eastman Fund, and Consolidated Edison thus allowing its objective to be achieved. Currently WIA is open to all women interested in the arts.

"Women Choose Women Exhibition" was organized as the first exhibition by WIA. The exhibition was held in 1973, at the New York Cultural Center, after Mario Amaya responded to an exhibition proposal that the WIA group sent to every major art museum in New York. The works that were exhibited were selected by a committee composed of WIA members, including Pat Passlof, Ce Roser, Sylvia Sleigh, Linda Nochlin, Elizabeth C. Baker, and Laura Adler. In all, 109 artists were selected from among the 700 anonymous submissions that were received to be exhibit in the show. Among those chosen for the exhibition were Audrey Flack, Hannah Wilke, Alice Neel, May Stevens, and Faith Ringgold. The exhibition was historic because a female panel, composed mainly of artists, selected the work of their sisters to be exhibited. “Women Choose Women” sought to represent the ability of all artists in order to overcome the hierarchy and bureaucracy of the museums.

Roser was a supporter of exhibiting in alternative spaces and stressed how exhibiting at the Mary H. Dana Artists Series opened a window that introduced her work to Lawrence Alloway. Her painting Double Vision (1991) was in the collection of her colleague, Sylvia Sleigh, who was married to Alloway. Today, the painting is part of the Sylvia Sleigh Collection at Rowan University. Roser also exhibited at the East Hampton Guild Hall "Artist of the Region," a show that sought to revel under-recognized talent.

== Selected solo exhibitions ==
- Ingber Gallery, NYC (1986, 1983, 1981, 1980, 1977)
- Elaine Benson Gallery, Long Island (1985, 1981, 1971)
- Ruth White Gallery, NYC (1967, 1964, 1961)
