= The Sister Chapel =

Visual arts installation conceived by Ilise Greenstein

The Sister Chapel (1974–1978) is a visual arts installation, conceived by Ilise Greenstein (1928–1985) and created as a collaboration by thirteen women artists during the feminist art movement. Before its completion, the critic and curator Lawrence Alloway recognized its potential to be "a notable contribution to the long-awaited legible iconography of women in political terms." The Sister Chapel is on permanent display at the Center for Art and Social Engagement, an initiative of the Rowan University Art Gallery in Glassboro, New Jersey.

== Origin and name ==
In 1973, the abstract painter Ilise Greenstein moved from Great Neck, New York, to Miami, Florida, where she experienced "frustration, anxiety and isolation" at being separated from the art scene in New York. This led to an "intense period of self-exploration" that resulted in the concept for The Sister Chapel. Originally planned as a hall of fame for women, The Sister Chapel evolved from a written concept in early 1974 to become a celebration of female "role models" who were chosen by women and portrayed by women.

The nominal pun regarding the Sistine Chapel ceiling was intentional. As the Sistine Chapel represented an apex of global and western culture, and a realization of the patriarchal conceptualization of history, The Sister Chapel comprised an invitation for people to re-imagine familiar, often unconscious presumptions about gender roles, recognition and relations from a female perspective. Greenstein explained that she was questioning the "version of creation" in the Sistine Chapel by asking, "where was woman in man's relation to God?" As Gloria Feman Orenstein explained in 1977, "This chapel, then, is not about the creation of man, but the birth of woman."

== Component works of art ==
The Sister Chapel features eleven panels that represent contemporary and historically significant women, deities and mythological figures, and conceptual heroic women. Each "role model" was selected and painted by a different artist, which allowed the participants to retain their individual styles:

- Bella Abzug—the Candidate (1976) by Alice Neel
- Betty Friedan as the Prophet (1976) by June Blum
- Marianne Moore (1977) by Betty Holliday
- Joan of Arc (1976) by Elsa M. Goldsmith
- Artemisia Gentileschi (1976) by May Stevens
- Frida Kahlo (1976) by Shirley Gorelick
- God (1977) by Cynthia Mailman
- Durga (1977) by Diana Kurz
- Lilith (1976) by Sylvia Sleigh
- Womanhero (1977) by Martha Edelheit
- Self-Portrait as Superwoman (Woman as Culture Hero) (1977–78) by Sharon Wybrants

Each of the monumental figures occupies a nine-by-five-foot canvas, arranged in a circle, into which viewers are invited to enter. Above the eleven panels hangs the circular abstract painted ceiling by Ilise Greenstein (1976). Its mirrored center invites viewers to see themselves in the company of the heroic figures of this "sisters universe," and to develop a new way of looking at history, culture, and themselves.

A tent-like fabric enclosure, designed by Maureen Connor in 1976, was meant to create an intimate space approximately 25 feet in diameter. For financial reasons, the structure was not executed in the 1970s but a model was constructed and shown at the premiere exhibition.

== Exhibitions ==
The installation premiered in January 1978 at P.S.1 in Long Island City, New York. It was positively reviewed in The New York Times and Newsday

After its premiere at P.S.1, The Sister Chapel was exhibited at SUNY–Stony Brook (November–December 1978), Cayuga County Community College (November–December 1979), and the Associated Artists Gallery in Fayetteville, New York (March–April 1980). At the last two venues, Greenstein's Ceiling for the Sister Chapel, Wybrants's Self-Portrait as Superwoman, and Connor's model for the Chapel structure were not exhibited. After 1980, The Sister Chapel fell into obscurity, although it continued to be mentioned in publications about women artists.

The Sister Chapel was eventually revived by Andrew Hottle, a professor of art history at Rowan University, whose research for a book about the installation led him to reunite the component works. In 2016, for the first time in 37 years, The Sister Chapel was exhibited in its entirety at the Rowan University Art Gallery in Glassboro, New Jersey. The new exhibition included Sharon Wybrants's recreation of her Self-Portrait as Superwoman because the original is lost. This was the first installation of The Sister Chapel to present the works inside the fabric enclosure designed by Maureen Connor. In The Philadelphia Inquirer, the art critic Edith Newhall wrote that "Hottle has produced something of an art-world miracle" by finding and reuniting the paintings.

In March 2019, the installation went on permanent display in the Center for Art and Social Engagement at Rowan University.

== Recognition ==
When The Sister Chapel was reunited in 2016, its historical importance was recognized by The Huffington Post, The Philadelphia Inquirer, and Artnet. The Sister Chapel was also featured in a segment of State of the Arts, a locally produced program on NJTV (now NJ PBS).

In March 2018, Travel + Leisure grouped The Sister Chapel with the Rothko Chapel, Matisse Chapel, Le Corbusier's Notre Dame du Haut, and other chapels that "combine artistry with worship."

The Sister Chapel was featured in a fashion photography spread in the August 2019 issue of Harper's Bazaar, serving as an environment for two pairs of sisters who wear Christian Dior clothing designed by Maria Grazia Chiuri; an interview with Chiuri by Robin Morgan accompanies the photographs.
