= Sylvia Sleigh =

Welsh-American artist (1916–2010)

- Self-Portrait at Belsize Square 1941
- Born: 8 May 1916; Llandudno, Caernarvonshire, Wales
- Died: 24 October 2010 (aged 94); New York City, New York
- Education: Brighton School of Art
- Known for: Painting
- Notable work: Philip Golub Reclining (1971); The Turkish Bath (1973)
- Spouse: Lawrence Alloway (m. 1954; died 1990)
- Awards: Distinguished Artist Award for Lifetime Achievement, College Art Association (2008); Lifetime Achievement Award, Women's Caucus for Art (2011)
- Website: sylviasleigh.com

The Turkish Bath (1973)

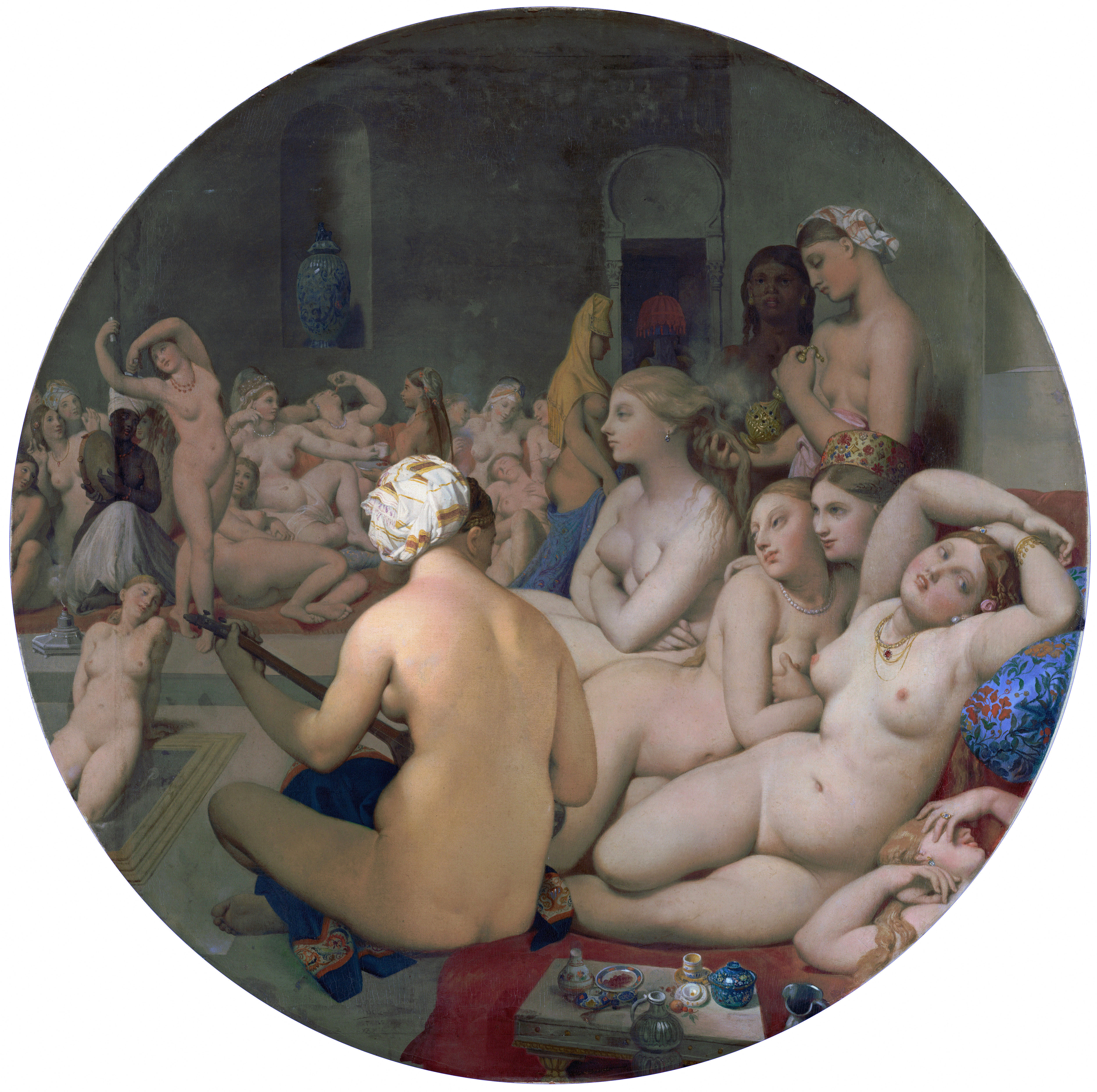
The Turkish Bath (1862) by Jean-Auguste-Dominique Ingres

Sylvia Sleigh (8 May 1916 – 24 October 2010) was a Welsh-born naturalised American realist painter who lived and worked in New York City. She is known for her role in the feminist art movement and especially for reversing traditional gender roles in her paintings of nude men, often using conventional female poses from historical paintings by male artists like Diego Vélazquez, Titian, and Jean-Auguste-Dominique Ingres. Her most well-known subjects were art critics, feminist artists, and her husband, Lawrence Alloway.

== Early life and education ==
Sleigh was born in Llandudno, and raised in England. She studied at the Brighton School of Art. For a time, she worked at a clothing shop in Bond Street, where she recalled "undressing Vivien Leigh". Sleigh later opened her own business in Brighton, England, where she made hats, coats, and dresses until she closed her shop at the start of World War II. She returned to painting and moved to London in 1941 after marrying her first husband, an English painter named Michael Greenwood. Her first solo exhibition was in 1953 at the Kensington Art Gallery in London. Sleigh met her second husband, Lawrence Alloway, an English curator and art critic, while taking evening classes to study art history at the University of London; they married in 1954 and moved to the United States in 1961. The following year, Alloway became a curator at the Solomon R. Guggenheim Museum.

== Work and feminism ==
=== Male nudes ===
Around 1970, from feminist principles, she painted a number of works reversing stereotypical artistic themes by featuring nude men in poses that were traditionally associated with women, like the reclining Venus or odalisque. Some directly alluded to existing works, such as Philip Golub Reclining (1971), which appropriates the pose of the Rokeby Venus by Diego Velázquez. The model was the son of the artists Nancy Spero and Leon Golub. This work also presents a reversal of the male-artist/female-muse pattern typical of the Western canon and is reflective of research into the position of women throughout the history of art as model, mistress, and muse, but rarely as artist−genius. Unlike earlier male artists, Sleigh individualized her nude subjects instead of representing them as generalized types.

The Turkish Bath (1973), a similarly gender-reversed version of Jean Auguste Dominique Ingres's painting of the same name, depicts a group of artists and art critics, including her husband, Lawrence Alloway (reclining at the lower right), Carter Ratcliff, John Perreault, and Scott Burton. Also shown are two views of Sleigh's frequent model, Paul Rosano. One pose borrowed directly from Ingres's painting is found in the figure of Rosano, seated on the left and playing a guitar with his back turned to the viewer. Alloway reclines in the conventional pose of an odalisque. Ingres's painting has many nude women but Sleigh minimized the number and painted only six men. She carefully painted individual body hairs. Over the course of her career, Sleigh painted more than thirty works that feature her husband as a subject. While somewhat idealized, Sleigh's figures remain highly individualized. She often used her husband and friends as models because they were important to her.

In her male nudes, the subject "is used as a vehicle to express erotic feelings, just as male artists have always used the female nude". In works such as Paul Rosano Reclining (1974) and Imperial Nude: Paul Rosano (1975), Sleigh portrayed her male subjects in stereotypical female poses in order to comment on past biases in which male artists have depicted sexualized female nudes.

Other works equalize the roles of men and women, such as Concert Champêtre (1976), in which all of the figures are nude, unlike its similarly composed namesake by Titian (earlier credited to Giorgione), in which only the women are unclothed. As Sleigh explained, "I feel that my paintings stress the equality of men and women (women and men). To me, women were often portrayed as sex objects in humiliating poses. I wanted to give my perspective. I liked to portray both man and woman as intelligent and thoughtful people with dignity and humanism that emphasized love and joy." Likewise, her painting of Lilith (1976), created as a component of The Sister Chapel, a collaborative installation that premiered in 1978, depicts the superimposed bodies of a man and woman to emphasize the fundamental similarities between the two genders.

=== Feminist activism ===
In 1972, Sleigh played a significant role in securing a venue and serving as a juror for Women Choose Women, a major exhibition of more than 100 works by female artists at the New York Cultural Center in January and February 1973.

Sleigh was a founding member of the all-women, artist-run SOHO 20 Gallery (est. 1973) and later joined the all-women cooperative A.I.R. Gallery (est. 1972), which opened a year before SOHO 20 and inspired its organizational structure. Sleigh painted group portraits of the artists in both organizations. The SoHo 20 Gallery Group Portrait was painted in 1974. Her A.I.R. Group Portrait (1977–78) is considered to be a document of the feminist movement, especially the centering of women in cooperative galleries. Among the feminist artists in A.I.R. Group Portrait are Nancy Spero, Howardena Pindell, Agnes Denes, Sari Dienes, Blythe Bohnen, Dotty Attie, and Mary Beth Edelson. Sleigh painted herself standing next to Howardena Pindell. Between 1976 and 2007, Sleigh painted a series of 36-inch portraits which feature women artists and writers, including Helène Aylon, Catharine R. Stimpson, Howardena Pindell, Selina Trieff, and Vernita Nemec.

In a 2007 interview with Brian Sherwin, Sleigh was asked if gender equality issues in the mainstream art world, and the world in general, had changed for the better. She answered, "I do think things have improved for women in general there are many more women in government, in law and corporate jobs, but it's very difficult in the art world for women to find a gallery." According to Sleigh, there is still more that needs to be done in order for men and women to be treated as equals in the art world.

During the last two decades of her life, Sleigh purchased or negotiated trades of over 100 works of art by other women and exhibited her growing collection at SOHO 20 Gallery in 1999. These included paintings, sculptures, and prints by Cecile Abish, Dotty Attie, Helène Aylon, Blythe Bohnen, Louise Bourgeois, Ann Chernow, Rosalyn Drexler, Martha Edelheit, Audrey Flack, Shirley Gorelick, Nancy Grossman, Pegeen Guggenheim, Nancy Holt, Lila Katzen, Irene Krugman, Diana Kurz, Marion Lerner-Levine, Vernita Nemec, Betty Parsons, Ce Roser, Susan Sills, Michelle Stuart, Selina Trieff, Audrey Ushenko, Sharon Wybrants, and many others. In 2011, the Sylvia Sleigh Collection was donated to the Rowan University Art Gallery and forms the core of its permanent collection.

=== Invitation to a Voyage ===
In 2006, Sleigh donated her largest painting, Invitation to a Voyage: The Hudson River at Fishkill (1979–1999), to the Hudson River Museum. In fourteen panels totaling 70 feet in length, Sleigh's panorama occupies two walls when exhibited. She was inspired by the pastoral works of Antoine Watteau, Giorgione, and Édouard Manet. Included are Sleigh's husband, Lawrence Alloway, and a group of friends who were mostly artists and art critics. They are picnicking, posing, painting, and interacting against the backdrop of the Hudson River and the nearby woods. The "Riverside" and "Woodside" sections, each consisting of seven panels, are exhibited opposite each other for an immersive experience.

== Recognition ==
Between 1953 and 2010, Sleigh had more than 45 solo exhibitions at colleges and universities, professional art galleries, and museums, most notably at Douglass College, University of Rhode Island, Ohio State University, Northwestern University, Philadelphia Art Alliance, Milwaukee Art Museum, and Butler Institute of American Art. A posthumous traveling solo exhibition was held at the Kunstnernes Hus in Oslo, Kunsthalle Sankt Gallen in Switzerland, CAPC musée d'art contemporain de Bordeaux, and the Tate Liverpool between 2012 and 2013.

Sleigh's work is in the permanent collections of the National Portrait Gallery in London, Art Institute of Chicago, National Museum of Women in the Arts, Virginia Museum of Fine Arts, Akron Art Museum, and others.

Sleigh taught at the State University of New York at Stony Brook in 1978 and at the New School for Social Research from 1974 until 1977 and between 1978 and 1980. As a visiting professor of painting, Sleigh was awarded the Edith Kreeger Wolf Distinguished Professorship at Northwestern University in 1977. She received a grant from the National Endowment for the Arts in 1982 and a Pollock-Krasner Foundation Grant in 1985.

In February 2008, Sleigh was interviewed by Lynn Hershman Leeson, who included a portion of the interview in her documentary !Women Art Revolution.

In 2008, Sleigh was honored with the Distinguished Artist Award for Lifetime Achievement by the College Art Association. She was similarly recognized by the Women's Caucus for Art, which posthumously awarded Sleigh the organization's Lifetime Achievement Award in 2011. She died of complications from a stroke in October 2010.

Sleigh's work was included in the exhibition Women Painting Women (2022) at the Modern Art Museum of Fort Worth and Framing the Female Gaze: Women Artists and the New Historicism (2023) at Lehman College Art Gallery, where her work was the "touchstone" for the exhibition.
