= Elena Borstein =

American artist (born 1946)

- Born: Elena Borstein; 1946 (age 79–80)
- Known for: Painting
- Website: elenaborstein.com

Elena Borstein (born 1946) is an American artist. She attended Skidmore College and the University of Pennsylvania. She taught at York College for over three decades. Her image is included in Sylvia Sleigh's 1974 group portrait SoHo 20 Gallery depicting the founding members of the SoHo 20 Gallery.

Her work is in the collection of the Museum of Modern Art (MoMA) and her work was exhibited in the MoMA 1979 group show Gifts of Drawing. York College Art Gallery held a retrospective exhibition of her work entitled The Gift of Art: 1985–2015, which featured her work that was donated to the university.
