= Renée E. Rubin Miller =

American painter and sculptor

Renée Rubin Miller
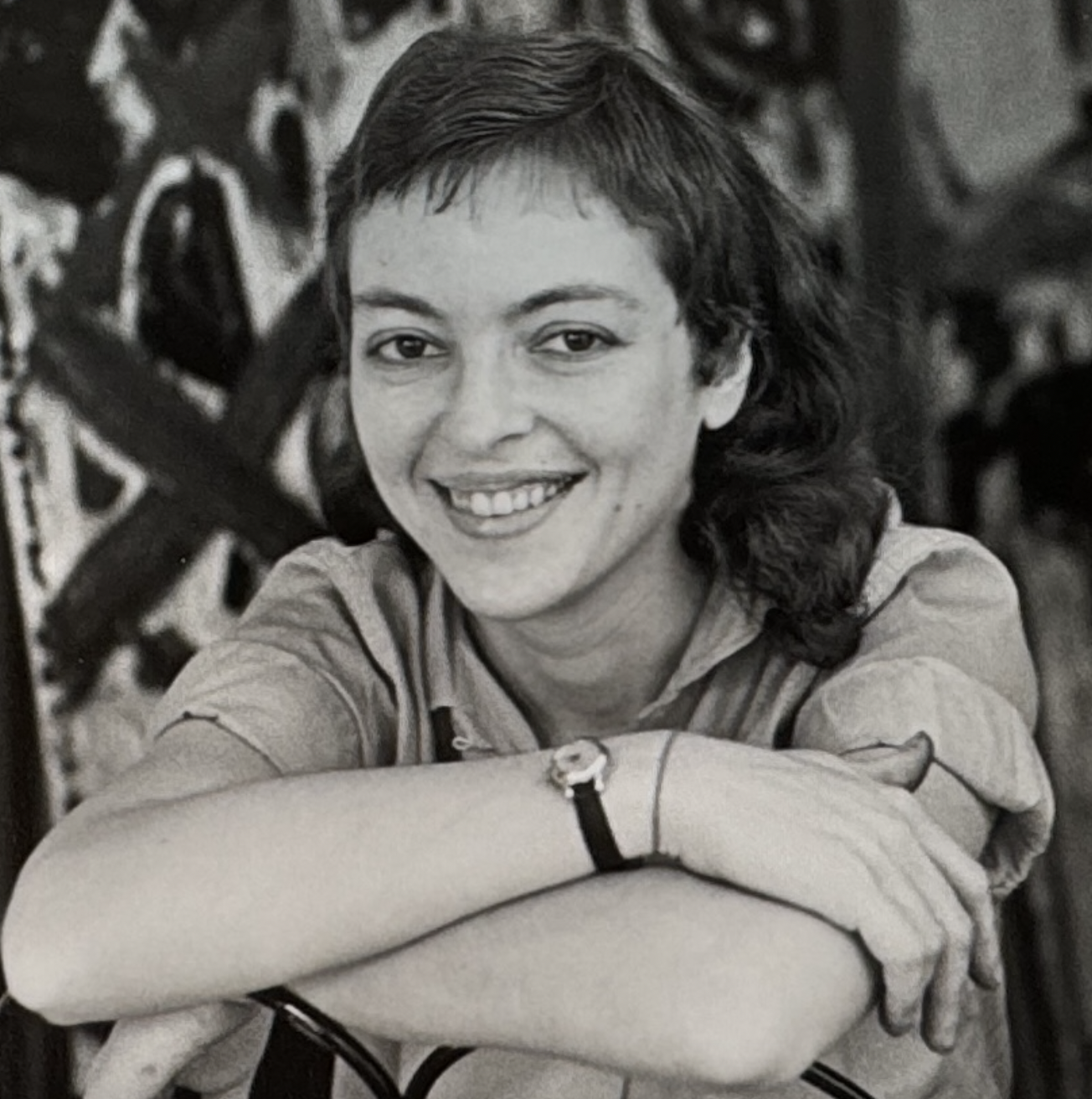
- Renée E. Rubin Miller in her studio, early 1960s. Courtesy of the Miller family archive.
- Born: November 9, 1929; Brooklyn, New York
- Died: March 8, 2025 (aged 95)
- Education: Hans Hofmann School of Fine Art; Brooklyn Museum Art School; National Academy of Design
- Known for: Painting, sculpture, abstract expressionism
- Notable work: Bug, Mask, and Stars, Coney Island Pinball

Renée E. Rubin Miller (9 November, 1929 - 8 March, 2025) was an American painter and sculptor associated with the New York avant-garde of the early 1960s. She was a member of the Reuben Gallery, where she exhibited alongside artists including Allan Kaprow, Jim Dine, Claes Oldenburg, and Red Grooms. Her work was exhibited at the Martha Jackson Gallery and the Solomon R. Guggenheim Museum, and was included in the 2017 exhibition Inventing Downtown: Artist-Run Galleries in New York City, 1952-1965 at New York University's Grey Art Gallery. Her later work drew critical attention in Gallery & Studio magazine, and in 2026 was the subject of a retrospective at the Hollis Taggart Gallery.

== Early life and education ==
Miller was born in Brooklyn, New York, where she attended Midwood High School. She received formal training from several major institutions, including the New York School of Painting and Sculpture, Hans Hofmann School of Fine Art, National Academy of Design, Ogunquit School of Painting and Sculpture, Nicolai Abracheff School of Fine Art, Brooklyn Museum Art School, and the Harry Engel School of Art.

== Artistic career and the downtown avant-garde ==
In the late 1950s, Miller joined the Reuben Gallery, an artist-run cooperative in Manhattan that became associated with the emerging Happenings movement and the downtown New York avant-garde. She exhibited alongside artists including Allan Kaprow, Jim Dine, Martha Edelheit, Claes Oldenburg, and Red Grooms. The Reuben Gallery was founded by Anita Rubin, Miller's sister.

Miller's early works were shown in exhibitions such as New Forms, New Media at the Martha Jackson Gallery in 1963 and Eleven from the Reuben Gallery at the Guggenheim Museum in 1965. Eleven from the Reuben Gallery was an exhibition organized by art critic Lawrence Alloway. In the accompanying exhibition essay, Alloway described Miller's extension paintings as "steam-rollered bouquets." The New York Times described the eleven artists of the show as seeking "to bring art back to the frame of human reference." The review identified the group's use of "commercial or mechanical debris" and unconventional materials as part of an artistic example spreading "like a forest-fire." In Allan Kaprow's 1965 Assemblages, Environments, and Happenings, Miller's Bug, Mask, and Stars was reproduced on a full-page photographic spread opposite a work by fellow abstract expressionist Jackson Pollock.

The Reuben Gallery's role in postwar American art has received renewed scholarly attention since the 2010s. Miller's work was included in the 2017 exhibition Inventing Downtown at New York University's Grey Art Gallery, which examined artist-run galleries in New York between 1952 and 1965. Art historian Melissa Rachleff devoted several pages to Miller's role as a woman in the 1960 Reuben Gallery exhibitions, describing her training and singling out her 1958 extension painting Coney Island Pinball as a work that "anticipated Pop." In a review of the exhibition, critic Blake Gopnik highlighted Miller's Coney Island Pinball, describing her as another "godmother" alongside Martha Edelheit of the "vitally goofy" extension style. Martha Edelheit, recalling her first arrival in New York in the late 1950s, identified Miller as one of the first woman artists she met and credited her, along with Allan Kaprow, with introducing her to the downtown art world and the Reuben Gallery.

After her early artistic period, Miller continued to work privately before returning to public exhibitions in the late 1990s under her maiden name. She exhibited at the Pleiades Gallery in Manhattan through the 2000s and 2010s. Her 2007 solo exhibition, "Old Masters: Self Portraits and Still Lifes," and her 2009 solo exhibition, "Artists Uncovered," each centered on depictions of art history's "Old Masters." Reviewing the 2009 show for Gallery & Studio magazine, critic Ed McCormack called Miller "a consummately engaging and ultimately rewarding painter." A separate 2006 review in the same magazine, by critic Jeannie McCormack, praised Miller's self-portrait That's Me as "a tour de force of Magic Realism."

In 2026, the Hollis Taggart Gallery mounted the retrospective Renée Miller: The Devil's Snare, accompanied by an essay by scholar Emily Chun examining Miller's role in the Reuben Gallery and postwar New York art.

== Selected exhibitions ==
- Renée Miller: The Devil's Snare, Hollis Taggart Gallery (2026)
- Inventing Downtown, Grey Art Gallery, NYU (2017) Rachleff, Melissa. Inventing Downtown: Artist-Run Galleries in New York City, 1952–1965. Grey Art Gallery, NYU, 2017.
- New Forms, New Media, Martha Jackson Gallery (1963)
- Eleven from the Reuben Gallery, Guggenheim Museum (1965)
- Solo and group shows, Reuben Gallery (1960–1961)
- Remnants of War, National Arts Club (2008)
- Solo shows, Pleiades Gallery (2007, 2009, 2013)
- Audubon Artists competitions, Salmagundi Club (1998–2016)
- Allied Artists juried shows, National Arts Club (2010–2011)
- Catharine Lorillard Wolfe Art Club, National Arts Club (1999)
- Director's Choice, Viridian Gallery (2007)
