= Ann Rowles =

American sculptor

- Born: 1947
- Education: University of North Carolina at Chapel Hill
- Known for: Sculpture
- Website: http://www.annrowles.com

Ann Rowles is an American mixed-media sculptor. She lives and works in Atlanta, U.S.

== Early life and education ==
Rowles received a Bachelor of Arts degree in Studio Art in 1969, and a Master of Fine Arts degree in Sculpture in 1990, both from the University of North Carolina at Chapel Hill.

== Career ==
Rowles has had several solo exhibitions in the United States, and participated in many group shows in the US and abroad. She has been a visiting artist at the Vermont College of Fine Arts and Western Carolina University, among others, and served as a juror and curator at venues throughout the Southeastern US. Rowles has been active with the Women's Art Movement since 1980, and affiliated with SOHO20 Gallery since 1992. She is the co-founder of the Women’s Caucus for Art of Georgia and has been on the National Women's Caucus for Art Board of Directors since 2004.

== Work ==
Rowles uses mixed media to investigate the material substance and structure of the human body. Her major series of work include Re-constructions (2014- ); Contortions (2004–13); Hyperplasia (1989–98); and Vests (1982-). Prior to 2000, Rowles’s work dealt with the social and emotional associations of clothing. For Vests, she created soft, suspended sculptures from a variety of materials, such as vinyl, rubber, plastic toys, zippers, and chenille wire, which playfully critique gender norms. With the Contortion series, Rowles turned to the structure of the body itself, crocheting forms suggestive of osteoporotic bones and digestive tracks. Specifically invoking the aging body, the sculptures were inspired by the artist’s experience of caring for her elderly mother. For Re-Constructions, Rowles created suspended sculptures out of molded layers of sheer fabric, to which she added wire mesh, crepe hair, rubber, bone, and silkscreened imagery. The visceral, skin-like quality of this work is reminiscent of Louise Bourgeois’s sculptures of the 1960s.

=== Major solo exhibitions ===
Riffs and Contortions, The Arts Exchange Gallery, Atlanta, GA, 2013.

Soft Works, Jim Cherry LRC Gallery, Georgia Perimeter College, Clarkston, GA, 2009.

Cut to Size, Chelsea Gallery, Western Carolina University, Cullowhee, NC, 2003.

Closet Installation: Memory & Fantasy, Artspace, Raleigh, NC; University of North Carolina at Charlotte, Cone Galleries, Charlotte, NC; Durham Art Guild, Durham, NC; Gallery A, Raleigh, NC; Brevard College, Brevard, NC.

Threads, Spirit Square Center for the Arts, Charlotte, NC; Meredith College, Weems Gallery, Raleigh, NC.

Hyperplasia, Hanes Art Center, University of North Carolina at Chapel Hill, Chapel Hill, NC; Durham Art Guild, Durham, NC, 1988.

Garments, Center/Gallery, Carrboro, NC, 1987.

Emerging Icons, Center/Gallery, Carrboro, NC, 1987.

=== Public collections ===
William King Regional Art Center, Abingdon, VA.

North Carolina Center for the Advancement of Teaching, Cullowhee, NC.
