= Morgan Sanders =

American painter, photographer, and author (1934–2021)

- Born: 1934; Salt Lake City, Utah, U.S.
- Died: April 27, 2021 (aged 86–87)
- Education: Reed College
- Known for: Children's literature, painting, photography
- Notable work: Alexander and the Magic Mouse (1969)

Morgan Sanders (1934 – April 27, 2021), also known as Martha Sanders, was an American painter, photographer, poet, and author of the children's book Alexander and the Magic Mouse.

== Children's book and comic strips ==
Sanders earned a B.A. in Literature at Reed College in 1955. She wrote Alexander and the Magic Mouse (1969) under the nom-de-plume Martha Sanders. It is a children’s book about an Alligator from China who lives with an Old Lady, a Brindle London Squatting Cat, a Magical Mouse, and a Yak. Although Sanders was a working artist, the French illustrator Philippe Fix was responsible for the pictures. According to one reviewer in 1970, they "make the book the success it is." The same reviewer likened the colors of Fix's illustrations to "yesteryear's tintypes," which "set the Victorian scene and show Alexander to best advantage." Sanders created her own illustrations for Branwell Snit, a comic strip that appeared between 1975 and 1977 in Wisdoms Child, a pennysaver in New York City. The comic strip similarly featured a cast of talking animal characters: Branwell F. Snit, a cogitating prodigy feline named after Branwell Brontë and based on Sanders's actual cat of the same name; Monroe, an undifferentiated bird; and Kenneth, a shaggy dog. In 2016, Sanders published her entire Branwell Snit comic strip series in The Branwell Snitbook: The Complete Branwell Snit Cat Comix.

== Poetry ==
Throughout her adult life, Sanders wrote poetry, which eventually "approached the Wordsworthian ideal of natural and yet heightened language." In 1975, one of her poems was included in an anthology of works by contemporary female poets. Sanders published a collection of her poems and a selection of her drawings in Looking for Lola: Poems & Drawings by Morgan Sanders, which was released in 2018. Most of the poems were written while she was living in New York City in the 1960s.

== Paintings and wall constructions ==
In 1973, Morgan Sanders was a founding member of SOHO20, the second all-women cooperative art gallery in New York City. For her initial exhibition at SOHO20 in early 1974, she showed three-dimensional wall constructions that combined painting and found objects. In his review, the art critic Peter Frank described the "progressions of dissimilar elements" as "episodic" and praised their suggestion of "a stream-of-consciousness narrative, with rapid, exhilarating changes of venue." At SOHO20 in 1975, Sanders exhibited four sets of photographs and three large paintings that depicted the aging interiors of turn-of-the-twentieth-century architecture on the Upper West Side of Manhattan, including Tiemann Place. The paintings, which showed the "marble of a lobby, metal work of a bannister, floor tiles, and masonry details," were segmented in a collage-like manner. A large nocturnal view of her apartment was similarly "disjointed," as if "the canvas was painted in sections," according to a reviewer in the New York Times.

== Photography ==
Sanders increasingly turned to photography in the late 1970s and began to create photographic series, such as Harlem Walls and Trucks. She showed Harlem Walls at the New York Public Library. Trucks was exhibited at The Camera Club of New York in 1980, and at the Viking Union Gallery in Bellingham, Washington shortly after Sanders moved there in 1982. The next year, she showed a photographic series called Flowers and Stones at Fairhaven College. Shot with a telephoto lens, the works were meant to be seen from a distance of 20 to 25 feet, which made the flowers "become the dipping and sweeping figures of dancers in flowing gauze gowns," in the words of one reviewer. By the end of the 1980s, she was photographing the countryside in Whatcom County, Washington.
