= Susan Sills =

American artist

Susan Sills (1941 - April 25, 2025) was an American artist involved in the international art scene from the early 1990s through the early 2020s.

Although she also created abstract ink drawings, and painted commissioned portraits, Sills is best known for her life-size painted wood cutouts based on the Old Masters. Sills produced over 100 different wood cutouts, and found innovative ways to bring these well-known icons of art into the present day. Her work is found in collections in Japan, New York City, and throughout the United States. Sills had 20 solo exhibitions and participated in numerous group shows. Sills was based in Brooklyn, New York, and represented by Viridian Artists gallery.

== Work ==
Most of Sills's work consists of life-size wood cutouts of Old Master subjects. While preserving the character and style of each iconic figure, she reimagines it in the context of today's world. As noted by Marilyn Becker, Sills's works have been "painstakingly painted in the style, technique and manner of each of their originators." In order to bring each two-dimensional character into a three-dimensional space, Sills reproduces them on the scale of actual humans and surrounds them with props, some of which are deliberately anachronistic. For example, her wood cutout of Princess Margarita from Diego Velázquez's Las Meninas is the same size as a real child. Sills's cutout of the young subject from Édouard Manet′s The Fifer (1994; Rowan University Art Gallery, Sylvia Sleigh Collection) is also the same size as a real child. In Utamaro, Utamaro, I'll See Utamaro, Sills's cutouts of Kitagawa Utamaro′s Geisha with String and Geisha with Mirror are "seated" on a real straw mat before a few empty McDonald's containers, two empty Pepsi cans, and pairs of chopsticks. The two life-size figures are painted in Utamaro's style, but reimagined in the context of the 21st-century world of fast food and carbonated beverages. In After Rivera, The Flower Carrier, the man from Diego Rivera’s painting is kneeling on an artificial patch of grass and flowers. Another work, What Sybil Saw, features the prophet from Michelangelo's Delphic Sybil. At her feet are several scroll-like photographs of David, which were obviously not a part of Michelangelo′s original.

Although artists have been painting “after the Old Masters” for centuries, Sills “has been recognized as owning the art form of the painted cutout.” Ed McCormack has suggested that Sills's cutouts show “how great works of art come into our lives to stay” and “make the world a better place by their presence.” Her work demonstrates that “the work of painters long dead can continue to have a vital presence in the life and work of contemporary artists” and that even in the 21st century, artists and viewers can find a way to relate to art from centuries ago.
