= Martha Edelheit =

American artist living in Sweden

- Born: Martha Ross; September 3, 1931 (age 94); New York City, New York, U.S.
- Education: University of Chicago, New York University, Columbia University; Michael Loew, Meyer Schapiro
- Known for: Painting, Constructions, and Film
- Spouse: Henry Edelheit M.D (married September 1951–December 1981)
- Partner: Sam Nilsson (1995–December 9, 2020)
- Children: 1
- Website: marthaedelheit.com

Martha Edelheit, (born September 3, 1931, in New York City), also known as Martha Nilsson Edelheit and as Martha Ross Edelheit, is an American-born artist living in New York City. She is known for her feminist art of the 1960s and 1970s, which focuses on erotic nudes.

== Early life ==
Edelheit was born September 3, 1931, in New York City. She always painted, starting in early childhood, and was initially trained as a pianist. Her grandparents were immigrants from Romania. She first lived in Sunny Side, Queens, and at the age of 10, moved to The Amalgamated in the Bronx with her parents. She attended the High School of Music and Art as a music student. Edelheit subsequently studied at the University of Chicago from 1949 to 1951, at New York University in 1954, and at Columbia University in 1955 and 1956. She received a BS in Early Childhood Education from the later institution in 1956, and also audited classes with Meyer Schapiro.She took a studio class with Michael Loew at his studio in NYC in 1957 and 1958. In 1951 she married Henry Edelheit, who was a medical student at the University of Chicago and subsequently became a psychoanalyst in New York.

== Career ==
Edelheit was a pioneer in the feminist art movement. She is known for her early works of erotic art . She began painting male and female nudes in the early 1960s, and was in the vanguard of figurative work that would gain attention in following decades .

Her earliest works are her abstract Extension Paintings from 1958–1961. This is followed by the Children's Game series from 1960–1962. During the 1960s she also began to work three-dimensionally, using mannequin body parts and found objects. In 1961, she began creating her erotic watercolors. She returned to this series in 2015. In 1962, she began to paint tattoos, dreams, and fantasies on her figures. In 1966 she exhibited at the Byron Gallery. This exhibition was the first to feature her Flesh Wall series of male and female nudes, erotic watercolors, and body part constructions.

Between 1972 and 1975 she produced her Back Painting series. In 1975, she began painting self portraits. In 1978, she created a group of graphite drawings on rag paper titled Flesh and Stone. Throughout the 1980s, she explored monoprints, oil pastels, colored pencils, ink, and graphite. In 1981, her husband died—an event that, together with other major losses in her life, gave rise to many of her subsequent grief series. Between 1980 and 1985, she worked with wood cutouts painted on both sides. This period also saw the creation of her Paper Doll Book (1984), a free-standing 6 × 4 ft plywood book with movable cutout body parts. In 1988, she produced a small group of bronze sculptures and began a series of works on paper that used string as the drawing medium. In 1989 Edelheit produced the sets for Bateaux des Revés, a dance production by Suzanne Gregoire which was performed on the lake in Central Park.

In 1993 she moved to the village of Svartsjö, Sweden, 32 km outside of Stockholm. Living in the countryside, far from public transportation made it difficult for her to have human models. She started working with her neighbors which were sheep, cows and chickens. In parallel, she worked with figure skating imagery from the Olympics, giving birth to the Ice Dancers series of 1998. In 2016, with the elections in the United States, she made USA November 8, a series of gutted, flayed, and slaughtered sheep.

Since 1961, Edelheit has participated in numerous group exhibitions, including 11 from the Reuben (1965, Guggenheim Museum), Three Centuries of the American Nude (1975, New York Cultural Center), BLAM! (1984, Whitney Museum of American Art), and Inventing Downtown: Artist-Run Galleries in New York City, 1952-1965 (2017, Grey Gallery, New York University) and Sixties Surreal (September 2025-January 2026, Whitney Museum of American Art). Throughout the 1970s, as the women's art movement flourished, Edelheit was an active participant in women-only group exhibitions, including Women Choose Women (1973, New York Cultural Center), Works on Paper—Women Artists (1975, Brooklyn Museum), Sons and Others (1975, Queens Museum of Art), and the traveling collaborative feminist installation The Sister Chapel (1978–80). Womanhero (1977), Edelheit's painting for The Sister Chapel, is a monumental female transmutation of Michelangelo's David, tattooed with images of Nut, Kali, Athena, Diana, and Guanyin to symbolize women's shared power over the course of many centuries.

Edelheit has also done production design for smaller theaters in New York from 1971 to 1974. She made four short experimental films in the 1970s, that were shown in film venues in the U.S. and Europe. Among them are: Hats, Bottles & Bones: A Portrait of Sari Dienes (1977) an artist portrait on Sari Dienes, shown at the Museum of Modern Art, and part of her film collection at the Anthology Film Archives. Edelheit taught filmmaking between 1976 to 1980. She was a visiting artist at CalArts, Valencia, California in 1973; and an artist-in-residence at the Wilson College, Chambersburg, Pennsylvania in 1975; the University of Cincinnati in 1975; and the Art Institute of Chicago, Chicago, Illinois in 1976. She was a guest lecturer at Montclair State College, Montclair, New Jersey in 1980; and the New School, New York, New York in 1977. In 2023 her work was included in the exhibition Action, Gesture, Paint: Women Artists and Global Abstraction 1940-1970 at the Whitechapel Gallery in London.

Edelheit lived in Sweden from 1993 until 2024. Her official biography states that she moved back to New York City in July 2024.

In March 2025 she curated Erotic City at Eric Firestone Gallery in New York. The Guardian reported that, at age 93, she curated over sixty works. In January 2026, her work was acquired by the Norton Museum of Art in West Palm Beach, Florida.

== Activism ==
Edelheit was a member of Fight Censorship (est. 1973), founded by Anita Steckel. Fight Censorship was composed of several women artists whose work focused on eroticism, including Joan Semmel, Judith Bernstein, Hannah Wilke, Juanita McNeely, Barbara Nessim, Eunice Golden, Carolee Schneemann, and Joan Glueckman. They lectured and educated the public about erotic art and the negative effects of censorship.

In 1977, Edelheit became an associate of the Women's Institute for Freedom of the Press (WIFP).

Edelheit was a member of Women in the Arts, Women/Artist/Filmmakers Inc, the Women's Caucus for Art (WCA) and an associate member of Soho20 Chelsea Gallery.

Her image is included in the 1972 poster Some Living American Women Artists by Mary Beth Edelson.

== Sweden ==
Martha Edelheit lived on a ten and a half acres of land in Svartsjölandet in Sweden, with her partner Sam Nilsson, from 1993 to 2024. Her partner died in 2020 and she moved back to New York City in 2024.

== Theatre sets ==
- The Wonderful Adventures of Tyl, Jonathan Levy] Triangle Theatre, 1971
- Message from Garcia + Was I Good?, two-act play by Rosalyn Drexler, New Dramatists Workshop, 1971
- The Whore and the Poet, by Sandra Hochman + Break A Leg, by Ira Levin, Urgent Theater, 1974
