= John Perreault =

American art historian

John Lucas Perreault (New York, New York, August 26, 1937 – September 6, 2015, New York, New York) was a poet, art curator, art critic and artist.

== Early life ==
Perreault was born in Manhattan and raised in Belmar and other towns in New Jersey. He studied briefly at Montclair State Teachers College, after which he enrolled in a poetry workshop at the New School for Social Research. His first book of poetry, Camouflage, was published in 1966, followed by Luck (1969) and Harry (1974).

== Professional work ==
Perreault was an editorial associate for ARTnews in the 1960s, an art critic for The Village Voice (1966–74), and senior art critic for The SoHo Weekly News (1975–82). He also worked briefly as the chief curator at the Everson Museum (1982). From 1985 to 1989, he was the first professional curator at the Newhouse Center for Contemporary Art in Staten Island. He was also senior curator at the American Craft Museum (1990–93). In later years, Perreault was interested in craft and served as the executive director of UrbanGlass. From 2004 until 2014, he wrote a blog called Artopia: John Perreault's art diary.

== Art and art criticism ==
As an art critic, Perreault's writing was clear and accessible. He championed the avant garde, including Minimalism, Land Art, and Pattern & Decoration. His work was published in 0 to 9 magazine, a journal which experimented with language and meaning-making. In 1968, when several names were used to describe the art now known as Minimalism, he predicted that the term minimalism would "stick."

In the 1970s, with the rise of the feminist art movement, he frequently wrote in support of art by women. In 1974, for example, he praised Sylvia Sleigh's recent nudes, calling them "as daring as ever, perhaps even a little bit more daring" and noting that she was "always willing to challenge herself and her viewers." The following year, he responded positively to Shirley Gorelick's paintings of African-American sitters. In his review of a group show at SOHO20 called Showing Off (1975), Perreault characterized Sharon Wybrants's Self-Portrait as Superwoman (Woman as Culture Hero) (1975) as "more than slightly tongue-in-cheek. But it demonstrates that women artists have egos too, sometimes just as big as any man's. And why shouldn’t they?" Perreault also praised Alice Neel's portrait of the art historian Linda Nochlin (now at the Museum of Fine Arts, Boston), calling it "a knock-out" and remarking that "Nochlin looks as if she has just had about enough of Courbet, whereas her daughter is the perfect imp."

At times, Perreault served as a subject for artists, including Alice Neel, whose John Perreault (1972) is now owned by the Whitney Museum of American Art. The two met when Perreault was working for ARTnews, but the portrait was painted for The Male Nude (1973), an exhibition that Perreault curated at the School of Visual Arts. As he later recalled, Neel thought he resembled a faun. Perreault also appears with other art critics—all unclothed—in Sylvia Sleigh's The Turkish Bath (1973). Perreault was later portrayed in Sleigh's 14-panel Invitation to a Voyage: The Hudson River at Fishkill (1979–99), now owned by the Hudson River Museum. In 1975, a bust-length portrait of Perreault was painted by Philip Pearlstein. Perreault later wrote a monograph on Pearlstein's drawings and watercolors, published in 1988.

Like other art critics, including John Ruskin and Clement Greenberg, John Perreault was also an artist. He created drawings, paintings, and found object constructions. Perreault's first exhibition of paintings and sculptures was in 1965. Later, he aimed "to attack what he calls the art supplies racket" by using "alternate media," such as Colgate toothpaste and oil-soaked beach sand. Another preferred medium was instant coffee grounds, which he used "in honor of" George Washington, "the 'inventor' of instant coffee," who once maintained a residence near Bellport, New York, where Perreault lived.

== Personal life ==
In 2008, Perreault married Jeff Weinstein, his partner of 32 years, in Provincetown, Massachusetts, after same-sex marriage was legalized there. Weinstein, who began as a restaurant critic, has held positions as an arts editor at The SoHo Weekly News (1977–79), editor of visual arts and architecture criticism at The Village Voice (1981–95), fine arts editor at The Philadelphia Inquirer (1997-2006), and editor of arts and culture at Bloomberg News (2006–07).

== Death ==
Perreault died in 2015, aged 78, from complications following gastrointestinal surgery.
