= Vernita Nemec =

Vernita Nemec (born 1942 in Painesville, Ohio), also known by the performance name Vernita N'Cognita, is a visual and performance artist, curator, and arts activist based in New York City. She earned her BFA at Ohio University in 1964 and has resided in New York City since 1965. She is also known for her soft stuffed sculpture, collages, artist's books, photographs, and installations. Nemec adopted the pseudonym "N'Cognita," a pun on incognito, as a way to honor artists who have not become well-known.

== Early work ==
Nemec began her multifaceted career in art making, curating, and arts activism in 1969, at MUSEUM: A Project for Living Artists. That year, with Carolyn Mazzello, she originated and contributed to X-12, one of the first exhibitions to feature only women artists. In the early 1970s, she was a member of Art Workers Coalition and Women Artists in Revolution (WAR), along with Nancy Spero, Leon Golub, Cindy Nemser, and Lucy Lippard. She also wrote for the feminist art periodical, Womanart. Nemec worked with other arts activist groups, including Art Against Apartheid and Political Art Documentation/Distribution (PAD/D).

Nemec became an artist-member of SOHO 20 Gallery in 1975. For her second solo show at SOHO 20, Nemec painted the gallery's 50-foot wall orange and covered it with orange paper, pencil and xerox self-portraits, stuffed dolls with her own face, and fabric silhouettes, as “a recording of the artist’s life (real or imaginary) and an exercise in self-searching."

In 1978, Nemec, Barnaby Ruhe, and Bill Rabinovitch organized the Whitney Counterweight, an exhibition that protested the elitism of the Whitney Biennial. As she explained to Grace Glueck of the New York Times, "We've felt from the beginning that the idea of the Whitney Biennial as an overview of American art was a very limited concept."

== Later work ==
In subsequent years, Nemec shifted her activism to helping artists. From 1989 to 1999, she was President and part-time Executive Director of Artists Talk On Art. In 1999, she became the part-time director of Viridian Artists, an artist-owned gallery in the Chelsea district of New York City. From 1994 to 2011, she organized 19 exhibitions of Art from Detritus around the United States; they consisted of environmental art made from recycled materials. Nemec's own visual art includes detritus works, for which she has been labeled an "environmental artist".

Nemec's performance work began with film backgrounds for the experimental filmmaker Phill Niblock. Her performances include audio projects for Tellus Audio Cassette Magazine, work with Linda Montano, gallery appearances, guerrilla performances, and appearances in large venues, such as Judson Church, as part of a series of programs curated by Movement Research.

Nemec was the last woman painted by the feminist artist Sylvia Sleigh in a series of 36-inch portraits, completed between 1976 and 2007, which feature women artists and writers.
