= Lucy Hodgson =

American sculptor and printmaker

- Born: 1940 (age 85–86); Damariscotta, Maine
- Education: Oberlin College, New York University
- Known for: Sculpture
- Spouse: Cervin Robinson

Lucy Hodgson (born 1940 in Damariscotta, Maine) is an American sculptor and printmaker based in the New England and New York City. For years, her work celebrated the emotive power of land and seascapes. More recently it focused on her anger and disapproval of the destruction of the environment, particularly by the oil and gas industry and the recent controversy surrounding fracking and the Keystone Pipeline.and the devastation of ancient monuments in the Middle East.

== Early life and career ==
Hodgson attended Oberlin College and earned an M.A. in Anthropology at New York University. Her background in anthropology was highly influential because it seemed to better address the relationship between art and culture than more traditional academic art curricula. Hodgson was fascinated by the impermanent materials used to create artifacts in pre-literate societies, and by how much care went into the creation of such ephemeral art objects. She is similarly unconcerned with the impermanence of many of her works; they are intended to weather and rot, and remind the viewer of the brevity of life.

Early in her career, the artist worked and gained skills at The Printmaking Workshop in New York City. Hodgson taught printmaking there as at Franklin and Marshall Collegewhere she also taught drawing.. She is affiliated with SOHO 20 Artists Inc., has had fourteen solo exhibitions, and participated in numerous group exhibitions in New England and around the world. Her work is in a number of public and private collections, including the Neuberger Museum of Art, Biblioteque Nationale, and the New York University Print Collection, as well as AT&T, Long Lines, Seiko, the Manufacturers Hanover Bank, Citicorp, Atlantic Richfield Co. and Chase Manhattan Bank.

== Work ==
=== Media and materials ===
During the 1980s through 2009, Hodgson often reconstituted building materials (shingles, vinyl roofing, etc.), in addition to natural materials such a wooden stumps, twigs, and reeds. These are combined to address the "conversion of natural elements into ones that will destroy the world as we know it," as in the juxtaposition of dying trees laden with industrial steel pipes and other human-made material. The tension between human intention and natural forces is a repeated motif in her body of work. In printmaking, Hodgson's works are limited to small editions, as she is opposed to mass production.

=== Site-specific works and assemblages ===
Lucy Hodgson's work is heavily influenced by nature. For Standing Remains: Remains Standing (1992), a site-specific work in West Kingston, Rhode Island at the South County Center for the Arts, Hodgson utilized a thirteen-foot-high maple tree trunk that was damaged by a hurricane. The piece was abstract, and she worked organically while carving into it with only hand tools, following the tree's natural shape, as opposed to having a fixed form in her mind. The trunk was still rooted and alive, which provided extra challenges in the work, but was characteristic of her interest in organic forms and natural forces. She acknowledged that the trunk was impermanent, and certainly subject to change through the passage of time, but rejected the idea that art must be permanent. Hodgson has remarked that she is interested in trees "for their very anthropomorphic qualities."

Rhyming the River (2006), an assemblage exhibited in Summer Show at the Tamarack Gallery, is a wall-mounted, horizontal triptych of cutout, interlocking wooden designs. As described by one reviewer, "While the negative spaces of the cutouts, and their overlapping shadows, create three-dimensional rhythms, the short, straight wood-grain lines offer a two-dimensional counterpoint."

=== Shingle sculptures ===
River's Revenge (2004) was part of the Sculpture In & By the River exhibition curated by Ann Jon on the banks of the Housatonic River in Massachusetts on the grounds of the Norman Rockwell Museum. The exhibition drew attention to the endangered river, historically and environmentally; thus, Hodgson's work was a natural fit, with her interest in the history of the region and environmental issues. Hodgson created a "snaking, writhing form made of New England house shingles, a testimony to the destructive power of floods," of which the Housatonic has a long history. She initially used shingles as bases for sculptures but became "interested in them for their own qualities." Bore (2005), exhibited in Sculpture in the Public Arena in Great Barrington, Massachusetts, is another lengthy structure composed of wood and shingles in a wave pattern, resembling an "undulating snake." It portrays a tidal bore, in which the incoming tide forms waves that travel up a river or inlet against the current. Hodgson's wood and shingle sculpture, All Fall Down (2009), which was exhibited in Contemporary Sculpture at Chesterwood 2013, likewise alludes to an "uncontrollable body of water that is open-mouthed and ready to consume and inundate anything that comes across its path." Her earliest undulating shingle sculpture, Surge (2003), fabricated originally for a World Heritage site at the Schokland Museum, Ens, NL, was later among the works in the Flux Art Fair (2016), in which art was positioned in Marcus Garvey Park in Harlem, NYC.

=== Recent work ===
More recent work, Pipelines and Power Stations (2013), concerns the destruction of the natural environment, specifically caused by hydraulic fracturing, through a series of pump-like forms made of twisting welded pipes. Her more playful series, Last Stand (2017), consists of similar constructions but are made of boxes, cages, poured concrete, pipes, animal skulls, antlers, and other objects found in nature, which are intended to prompt the viewer to question "whether they are an industrial imitation of nature, or, through the evolution of the anthropocene, if this is what nature has become."

== Awards and honors ==
Hodgson has been awarded residencies in South Korea and Hungary, as well as funding from The Netherlands America Foundation (2003). In 2004, she was a fellow at the MacDowell Colony.
