= Phyllis Mark =

American artist (1921–2004)

Phyllis Mark was an American modern artist (January 20, 1921 – May 23, 2004). She was a leading proponent of kinetic sculpture, rotating indoor works on motors, outdoor works by wind or water. Mark also had an enduring interest in light. She first generated light within the work itself, using small electric bulbs. Later she began to work in polished metal, creating interactions between the work, its reflections, and cast shadows. She was an early proponent of sculptural editions, first in small scale, her Sculpture-to-wear, art conceived as jewelry, later in her larger kinetic works. Throughout her career, Mark explored concepts in her art alongside pure abstraction. An important example in two dimensions is a form of picture writing that she termed Color Alphabet. In her sculptures, conceptual interests, always implicit, became increasing explicit over time. In late career she executed a number of large-scale works, photographed the work and its intended site, and "sited" the work in photomontage.

== Life and career ==
Mark was born in New York City and centered her career there. She studied with Grace Greenwood, a 'New Deal' social realist painter active in the WPA, and with Seymour Lipton, a major proponent of abstract expressionist sculpture, both at The New School. Fritz Glarner was a family friend and was a sounding board and mentor at important stages of her career.

=== Early career ===
Mark began her career as an expressionist figural painter in the early 1950s. Later in that decade and in the early '60s, her painting became increasingly abstract, tending to shapes that evoke plant and primitive life forms, so-called Biomorphism. The evolution of Mark's painting in these years can be traced in three one-woman exhibitions in her native New York City, the first at the Verna Wear Gallery, 1957, the second and third at the Kaymar Gallery, 1962 and 1964.

=== Wood relief sculpture ===
In the mid '60s Mark first experimented with wood relief. Most of these reliefs had a raised biomorphic black shape against a white background. Some hid small lights behind the relief, others added visible lights. The raised relief and added lights transformed the shadows of the work from an incidental and passive element of gallery installation to a manipulated element of composition: form and shadow. The artist exhibited works of this stage in a one-woman show at the Ruth White Gallery, Manhattan, NY, in 1966.

=== Anodized aluminum ===
Soon after her 1966 show, Mark began working in polished, anodized aluminum. These sculptures continued her biomorphic interests, but the polished surfaces of the sculpture created shadows and reflected light: form, shadow, reflection. Fabricators produced these works to the artist's design and under her supervision. Some were unique works, but Mark began at this time to commission numbered editions of her designs, "multiples".

=== Suspended and table-top kinetic sculpture ===
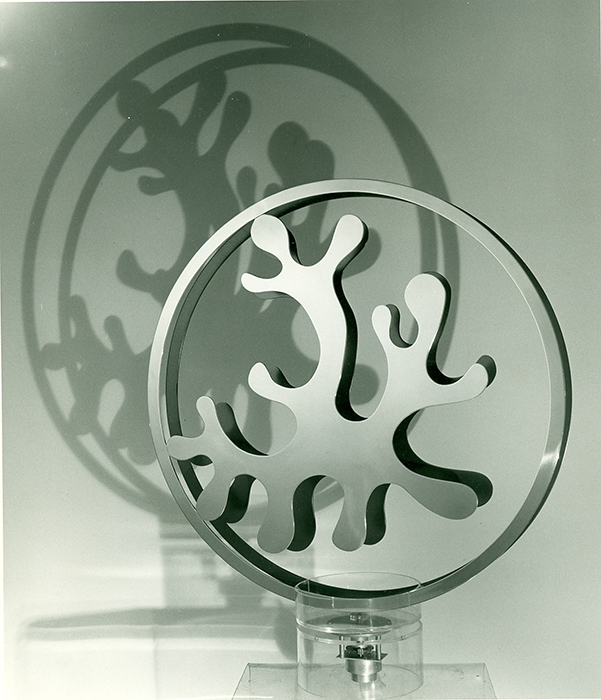
Early table-top kinetic sculpture on motorized base. Bacchanal, 1968. Polished anodized aluminum. 24”.

Mark's earliest kinetic sculptures moved on rotating bases. In later works she suspended central planar forms within one or more circular, oval or rectangular frames: the interior elements moved within their rotating frames.

Sculpture with moving elements, kinetic sculpture, remained a guiding interest of this artist through the rest of her career. Her first aluminum and early kinetic sculptures were exhibited at Ruth White Gallery in 1968.

=== Sculpture-to-wear ===
In the early 1970s Mark conceived the idea to execute her designs in miniature as jewelry, her Sculpture-to-wear. A major turning point of her career came in 1972, when the Museum of Modern Art commissioned an edition of 100 Sculpture-to-wear, individually numbered, 23-karat gold-plated aluminum, for sale in its gift shop. This edition, entitled Kinetic Circle, was followed by a second MoMA gift shop commission, Quadrille, again an edition of 100 in gold-plate. In agreement with MoMA, the artist manufactured these same designs in aluminum, unplated, in numbered editions of 250, for sale elsewhere. These same years saw the artist initiate other Sculpture-to-wear designs, editions of 100/250, including Seahorse Oval, Aztec Memory, Arabesque, Enclosed Triangles, some ten designs in all. These were for sale at her one-woman exhibitions, and were on permanent display at a number of galleries, including Gimpel & Weitzenhoffer in Manhattan; Fontana Gallery, Narberth, PA; Gallerie 99, Bay Harbor Islands, FL; Images Gallery, Toledo, OH; and Rubiner Gallery, Royal Oak, MI.

=== Color alphabet ===
Alongside her sculpture, Mark continued her early work in two dimensions. Important among these works was a series of visual poems executed in a pictorial alphabet. She created this visual language by pairing small, simple, visually distinct compositions, one for each letter of the alphabet, and transcribing poems and short phrases to their visual equivalent. The sequence of forms is difficult, nearly impossible to decode fluently back to the original (to guide the viewer she usually included the original text to one side or in the margins of the composition), but the repetition of common pronouns and prepositions is visually evident, and common letter groupings and patterns of the language introduce visual rhythms that structure the whole.

=== Outdoor kinetic sculpture ===
The earliest of Mark's large metal sculptures, although not explicitly conceived for outdoor setting, were suitable for the outdoors, and several were so exhibited at the Elaine Benson Gallery, Bridgehampton, NY, first in 1974.

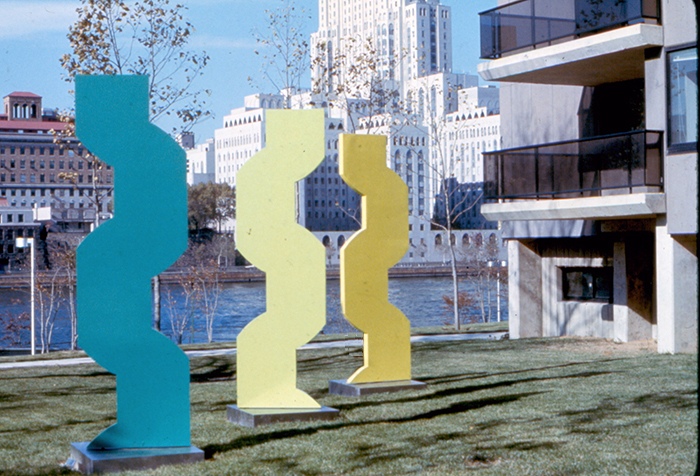
Wind Intervals, 1976. Stainless and enameled steel. Each unit, 11' tall on a 3' square base. The units turn in the wind.

Soon after, Mark began to actively explore the kinetic potential of outdoor siting. She completed and sited the earliest of these works, Wind Intervals, under the auspices of a non-profit artists' collaborative active at that time, Artists Representing Environmental Arts (A.R.E.A.), and the New York City Department of Cultural Affairs. Wind Intervals stood on New York's Roosevelt Island from 1976 to 1983.

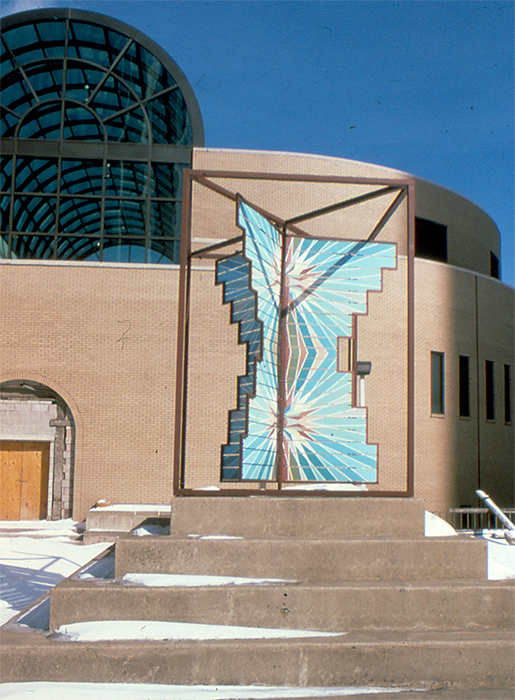
Pyramid Butterfly installed in Robert Moses Plaza, Fordham University at Lincoln Center, NYC, 1985. Painted steel and aluminum. 9,5' H x 8' W x 6.5' D. Center pivots in the wind.

A late example of her large outdoor kinetic sculptures, Pyramid Butterfly, 1985, stood in Robert Moses Plaza, Fordham University at Lincoln Center, from spring 1985 to fall 1986.

=== Later career ===
Toward 1989 and throughout the 1990s, Mark executed a series of large-scale sculptures, photographed the works and their intended sites, and sited the works in photomontage. These sculptures and photomontages were exhibited in a one-woman show entitled Improbable Sites at SOHO20 Gallery, New York, NY, in 1990. This site-specific art developed the conceptual considerations of artistic form and siting that were already present, if less explicit, in her work with A.R.E.A.

== Archives ==
Museum of Modern Art (MOMA), New York, NY. Miscellaneous archival materials. Smithsonian, Archives of American Art, Phyllis Mark papers, 1930-1977. Papers from 1977 to the artist's decease remain at present with her estate.
