= Cynthia Mailman =

American painter (1942–2025)

- Born: December 31, 1942; Bronx, New York City, U.S.
- Died: December 19, 2025 (aged 82); Sunset Park, Brooklyn, New York City, U.S.
- Education: School of Industrial Art, Pratt Institute, Mason Gross School of the Arts
- Occupations: Painter, educator
- Notable work: God (1977), created for The Sister Chapel; Commuter Landscape (1979)

Cynthia Mailman (December 31, 1942 – December 19, 2025) was an American painter and educator. She was known for figurative and landscape works done in a "cool, pared-down" style. Her early paintings were presented from a perspective inside the artist's VW van, looking outward, and include mirrors, wipers or other interior elements against the exterior landscape. By doing this, Mailman put the observer in the driver's seat, which is also the artist's point of view. According to Lawrence Alloway, "The interplay of directional movement and expanding space is a convincing expansion of the space of landscape painting".

== Education ==
Mailman graduated with an academic diploma in Advertising Art and Illustration from the School of Industrial Art (SIA), earned a BS in Fine Art and Education from Pratt Institute, and received an MFA in painting from the Mason Gross School of the Arts, Rutgers University.

== Feminism ==
Cynthia Mailman was an active participant in the feminist art movement. She was an original member of SOHO20 Artists (est. 1973), often called SOHO20 Gallery, a feminist, artist-run exhibition space. Mailman also participated in The Sister Chapel, a collaborative installation that celebrated female role models, which premiered at P.S.1 in January 1978. For The Sister Chapel, Mailman painted God, a monumental painting of the supreme deity in the form of a powerful nude woman.

== Commissions ==
In 1979, Mailman was commissioned to create a mural for the PATH concourse at the original World Trade Center station. The commission was by the Port Authority of New York and New Jersey through the CETA Artist Project. The 8-by-54-foot mural was entitled Commuter Landscape, a view of the Pulaski Skyway as seen through the train windows. It was seen by over 100,000 people a day. It was destroyed in the first terrorist attack on the WTC in 1993. Mailman declined to recreate it afterwards. Other commissions came from City Walls, Inc. for a 24-by-26-foot wall mural in Staten Island, and from The Wall Street Journal for the 2000 Cow Parade in NYC

== Collections ==
During her lifetime, Mailman had over 20 solo exhibitions and participated in numerous group shows. Her work is in the permanent collections of the Everson Museum, the Jane Voorhees Zimmerli Art Museum, the Staten Island Museum, as well as the Sylvia Sleigh Collection at the Rowan University Art Gallery. Her work is also in numerous private collections. Mailman has received grants from the New York State (1976, 1987) and Staten Island, NY (1987) art council, as well as from the NJ Committee on the Humanities (1979) and a CAPS grant (1976). Her work has been reviewed and discussed in many major newspapers and art journals.

== Early Life and Death ==
Mailman was born in the Bronx, New York on New Years Eve. She has a younger sister, Pamela. Mailman married Silver Sullivan and they lived in Brooklyn Heights, Brooklyn and Stapleton, Staten Island. Mailamn died at Calvary Hospital in Sunset Park, Brooklyn, New York on December 19, 2025, at the age of 82.
