= Emily Fuller =

American painter

Emily Rutgers Fuller
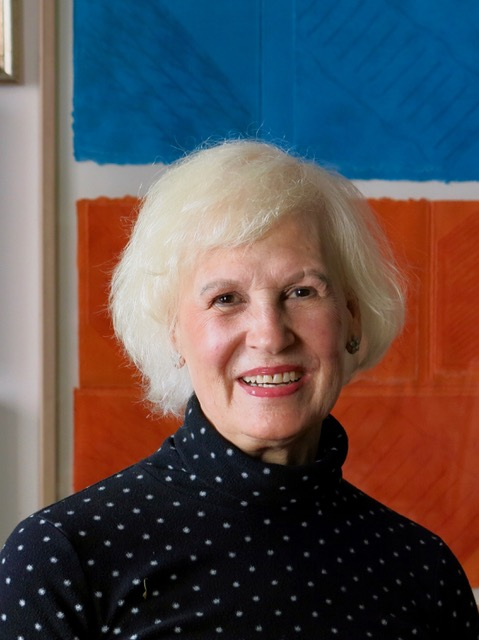
- Born: August 9, 1941 (age 85); New York, New York
- Occupation: Artist
- Website: www.emilyrutgersfullerart.com

Emily Rutgers Fuller (born August 9, 1941) is an American artist who has been working in a variety of media since the Seventies. Also known as Emily R. Fuller, and Emily Fuller Kingston, she lives and works in New York City and Dutchess County, New York.

Fuller describes herself as "a contemporary painter who finds subject matter in New York State's Harlem River Valley in northeast Dutchess County." Her work was praised by the critic John Russell of The New York Times in the course of an article, "Art: New Drawings at the Modern". Among praise for her work, he concluded: "There is nothing wrong with a department that can range with an easy assurance from de Chirico and Modigliani to Miss Fuller."

Michael Florescu, writing for Arts magazine in 1979, suggested that “Fuller’s works …are stimulative rather than meditative…maps charting a sequence of movements rather than of resting places, which speak of the inevitable need for definition. It would express itself thus: ‘I am myself (rather than anyone else) because I have traveled, and where I have set foot I have left my mark.’”

== Early life ==
Fuller was born in New York City and raised on Long Island. Her sensitivity to color, texture and composition was formed early in life by exposure to her parents' extensive gardens.

She was also influenced by the work of her grandmother, Lucy Washington Hurry (1880–1950), a still-life watercolorist who studied at the Art Students League of New York with Kenyon Cox and Fayette Barnum, and whose work was shown at the Philadelphia Water Color Exhibition alongside that of Edith Emerson, Jessie Willcox Smith, Clifton Wheeler, Violet Oakley and Jules Guerin in 1919.

== Education ==
Fuller studied at the School of the Museum of Fine Arts, Boston, between 1962 and 1966, at Tufts University in 1966, at the Art Students League in New York (where she was taught by Richard Mayhew) during 1968 and 1969, and at the School of Visual Arts in New York (where she was taught by John A. Parks) during 1998 and 1999.

Originally an abstract artist, Fuller has also been sewing paper and canvas works since 1977. She learned how to sew at the Garland Junior College (now known as Simmons University) in Boston, where it was a required course.

She has said, "The art of Dutch, French and German paintings from the 16th through the 18th centuries is very appealing to me." More contemporary influences included Nancy Graves, Jasper Johns, Christo, Henri Matisse,and Willem de Kooning.

== Career ==
Fuller's first solo show was at 55 Mercer, an artist-run gallery in New York City, in 1972. In a review for ARTnews magazine, the artist/writer Bill Beckley singled out “a piece which combines various tones of grey and black [which] hangs elegantly from its four axes, all superfluous color eliminated.”

Fuller’s “Strip Hanging #4,” a hanging plastic sculpture, was praised by Elizabeth Weatherford in a 1973 assessment for Ms. magazine: “[Fuller] returns artwork to areas of feeling, seeing in the process of cutting and sewing a return to the craftsmanship of goods made by hand; goods that are not unfamiliar to people.”

One of her paper pieces was shown in a group show called "New Art for the New Year" at the Museum of Modern Art in February 1978. Among the other artists exhibited were Jim Dine, Jasper Johns, Philip Pearlstein, James Rosenquist, Frank Stella, and Tom Wesselmann.

Fuller's work has also been exhibited abroad. It was included in UNESCO's "Féminin-dialogue Peinture/Couture" in Paris in 1977, and in "Neue Stofflichkeit" (New Materialism) at the Bonn Women's Museum in Germany in 1984.

Fuller's mature style was described in some detail as part of a review of her one-woman show in Millbrook, New York in 2015: "The multi-media works evoke the glory of the surrounding area, fields, mountains and trees, but with a variety of materials, colors, and stories to tell that are far different from the landscapes one usually expects to see…. The myriad materials used, creations of a playful and creative imagination, run from paper to canvas to textiles, sewn, glued, painted, photographed – many with a touch of glitter and metallic paint."

Fuller's work is in the collection of the Museum of Modern Art.

== Personal life ==
In 1970 Fuller married Carl John Kingston ll, known as CJ. He was named after his grandfather, Carl John Kingston, a mining engineer from the Upper Peninsula of Michigan, who with his wife, Caroline Los Kamp Kingston, bought a farm outside Casablanca, Chile in the early part of the 20th Century. The farm is still owned by the Kingston family, who founded Kingston Family Vineyards on the property in the early 1990s.

Before the birth of their son, John Kingston became ill with cancer of the liver and Intestines; their son, Sam Kingston, was only seven months old when his father died on October 27, 1972. Fuller's second marriage ended in divorce.
