= Marion Ranyak =

American painter

Marion Lorraine Ranyak
- Born: 25 January 1925; New York City
- Died: 22 August 2018 (aged 93); Stamford, Connecticut
- Education: Wheelock College
- Known for: Painting

Marion Lorraine Ranyak (25 January 1925 — 22 August 2018) was an American painter who lived and worked in Rye, New York, and was a founding member of SOHO20.

== Early life and education ==
Born Marion Hannig in New York City, she was the daughter of William A. Hannig and Carolyn Exner Hannig. Her father was a public school principal and later a member of the Board of Examiners (1921–53), an agency in New York City that set personnel standards for administrators and educators. Her mother operated a successful family-owned sand and gravel company. In 1950, Marion Hannig married John A. Ranyak; they divorced in the mid-1970s

In 1946, after an unsatisfactory educational experience at Wheelock College, Marion Ranyak spent six weeks in Provincetown, Massachusetts, where she studied with the painter Hans Hofmann. The result, she said, was a "very strong feeling of the two-dimensionality of the surface" which was "always there" in her paintings. Ranyak also began to travel—to California, France, and eventually Italy. While her husband was enrolled at MIT and she was raising their three children, Ranyak had little time to paint; she ceased for 14 years but resumed work in 1962. Reading Betty Friedan’s The Feminine Mystique, as she later noted, "gave me a support that I got nowhere else in my life." Ranyak identified as a feminist and supported many liberal causes.

== Work ==
Ranyak was a founding member of SOHO20 (est. 1973), the second all-women, artist-run art gallery in New York City. At SOHO20, she initially exhibited painted geometric abstractions and cement "sandcastings," but an interest in photography led her to explore more realistic views of nature. Her small paintings of pebbles, stones, rocks, grass, and leaves—exhibited at SOHO20 in 1978—emphasize flatness through simplified but precise forms. Ranyak's acrylic paintings were positively reviewed in The New York Times by Vivian Raynor, who described her landscapes as "modest" but with "an air of authority." Raynor later wrote that Ranyak "makes Neil Welliver look like an Expressionist." Ranyak was praised by another critic for her ability to suggest texture while using flatly applied acrylic paint, as in Nova Scotia—Grassy Slope (1985). Her later paintings of fields in upstate New York were well received by Michael Brenson, who wrote, "She touches the canvas as delicately as a bird … The light in her paintings is always at that point of gray heat that sets everything in a landscape in motion."

Ranyak remained a full member of SOHO20 until 1988 and continued as an associate member until 1995. In later years, she lost interest in the urban art scene and exhibited primarily in Westchester County, New York. She died on 22 August 2018, in Stamford, Connecticut)
