= Shirley Gorelick =

American painter (1924–2000)

- Born: Shirley Fishman; 24 January 1924; Brooklyn, New York
- Died: 19 October 2000 (aged 76); Washington, DC
- Education: Teachers College, Columbia University; Brooklyn College
- Occupations: Painter, sculptor, printmaker
- Spouse: Leonard Gorelick (m. 1944)
- Children: Jamie S. Gorelick, Steven M. Gorelick
- Website: shirleygorelick.com

Shirley Gorelick (24 January 1924 – 19 October 2000) was an American figurative painter, printmaker, and sculptor. She "rejected both the extremes of nonobjectivity and photographic exactitude," choosing instead to use a range of sources that included photographs, live models, and her own sculpted life studies.

== Early life and education ==
Born Shirley Fishman in Brooklyn, New York, she attended Abraham Lincoln High School. Her teacher, Leon Friend, arranged for guest lectures by commercial and fine artists. Shirley Fishman had the opportunity to study with three of them: Chaim Gross, Moses Soyer, and Raphael Soyer. Gross influenced her early sculptural work, which features squat figures with thick limbs. While attending Brooklyn College, where she earned her B.A. in 1944, she met Leonard Gorelick (1922–2011), a fellow student. They married in 1944 and shared an enthusiasm for art and culture. Leonard Gorelick was an orthodontist and later a collector of cylinder seals. He combined his interests by investigating the authenticity of cylinder seals through the use of dental technology, especially electronmicroscopy. Shirley Gorelick earned an M.A. at Teachers College, Columbia University in 1947. That year, she studied for several weeks with Hans Hofmann in Provincetown. For a short time in the late 1950s, she was a student of the painter Betty Holliday and, in the early 1960s, learned printmaking in the Long Island studio of Ruth Leaf.

== Early work (1945–1965) ==
By the mid-1960s, Shirley Gorelick had worked in various media, including painting in oils and acrylics, intaglio printmaking, drawing in silverpoint, and sculpting in terracotta, stone, and wood. She initially explored a variety of artistic styles and was influenced by Cubism, Surrealism, Expressionism, and Abstract Expressionism, but became uncomfortable with the modernist distortion of the human figure and began a return to realism. In 1959, her focus turned to expressively rendered female nudes, often seated or reclining, which were painted with loose, fluid brushstrokes that allowed her to liken the body to a landscape. Responding to her first solo exhibition, at the Angeleski Gallery on Madison Avenue in 1961, Stuart Preston commented on the "impressive warmth" of Gorelick's nudes while noting that "form is abstracted and played around with such lavish complexity as almost to defeat its own ends as figure depiction." By 1965, she was reimagining canonical works of art, including Pablo Picasso's Les Demoiselles d'Avignon (1907) and Giorgione's Concert Champêtre by recasting the figures as more lifelike studio models. Her Homage to Picasso I (1965), for example, uses nude models with real volume instead of rendering them in Cubist facets.

== Realist work (1965–1995) ==
Between 1967 and 1969, Gorelick created a series on the theme of the Three Graces but represented ordinary, mature, and finally African-American women in place of the traditional, idealized European nudes. This led her to focus on a Black model named Libby Dickerson (1921-1995), who appears alone, doubled, and with her interracial family in a series of paintings and etchings that were completed between 1970 and 1974. Dickerson and her family are portrayed informally and illuminated with by strong light source. When the works were exhibited at SOHO 20 Gallery in 1975, the art critic John Perreault enthusiastically remarked, "There is a classical humanism going on here. For her subjects live. They puncture the 'picture plane' with their eyes and their lives. She has invented the palette for black skin, sorely needed." Gorelick's Willy, Billy Joe, and Leroy (1973), a portrayal of three African-American men standing in the artist's studio with The Family II (1973) as a backdrop, was also praised by art critics. As inspiration, Gorelick continued to draw upon earlier artists, including Paul Cézanne, Paul Gauguin, and Johannes Vermeer, but her realist works synthesized her sources and modern subjects more completely.

As the feminist art movement gained momentum, Gorelick was a founding member of Central Hall Artists Gallery (est. 1973), an all-women, artist-run gallery in Port Washington, New York. She also joined SOHO 20 (est. 1973), a women-only and specifically feminist cooperative gallery in New York. Though not one of the founding artist-members of SOHO 20, her tenure with the gallery began in 1974, at the start of the second season. Between 1975 and 1986, Gorelick had six solo exhibitions at SOHO 20 and participated in numerous group shows.

Gorelick's next series, Three Sisters (1974–77), depicts a trio of sibling models who range from seventeen to twenty-one years of age, robed and nude, in a leaf-patterned garden. They are far more individualized than the figures in her works of the early 1960s. Described by one reviewer as a group of "flabby teenagers who are ... the products of leisurely, suburban living," Gorelick's unidealized figures were meant to reveal psychological states, with varying degrees of pain, questioning, anger, and confusion communicated by nuances of position, gesture, or facial expression. As described by Lawrence Alloway in 1977, Gorelick's work had taken on "a new lyrical undercurrent. This comes through most fully in a large painting of 'Three Sisters', each one of whom appears twice, once nude, once loosely robed. Thus three become a crowd, but the echoes of paired likeness and familial resemblance imply a pattern of kinship. The girls, all posed toward the spectator, stand in a garden, ankle deep in leaves, against an overgrown wall."

In 1976, Gorelick painted a nine-foot portrait of Frida Kahlo for The Sister Chapel, a feminist collaboration by thirteen artists which celebrated female role models. Gorelick appropriated a number of elements from Kahlo's own paintings, as well as photographs that were taken of the Mexican painter. By this time, Gorelick's work was recognized for her use of "all sources of information," including photos, models, and xeroxes, "to get as close to the core of her subjects as possible."

In 1977, Gorelick turned to representations of middle-aged couples, either together or individually, as in Gunny and Lee I (1977), The Barnetts (1979–80), and Dr. Joseph Barnett I (1981). The earlier series depicts Lee Benson (1922-2012), an academic and historian who wrote The Concept of Jacksonian Democracy (published in 1961), and his wife Eugenia, known as Gunny. Gorelick's portraits of the Bensons, including Gunny and Lee II (1979), were described in The New York Times as "dynamic visual experiences, made dynamic through well-crafted and provocative compositions. Miss Gorelick especially likes to group two people together, something she does with flair, demonstrating a strong psychological nexus between the two sitters." Her slightly later series on the theme of middle-aged couples, begun in 1980, features Dr. Joseph Barnett (1926-1988) and Dr. Tess Forrest (1922-2009), both psychoanalysts. Gorelick's imperious Tess in a Blue Dress (Dr. Tess Forrest) (1980) shows the sitter in her office with a backdrop of books, "catching us with a gaze both shrewd and confident," as one reviewer noted. In the portraits of the Bensons and Barnetts, the figures are over life-size, close to the viewer, and cropped.

Gorelick's final series, begun in 1982, is a group of landscape paintings representing the Gorges du Verdon, which she was inspired to paint after a trip to the area. The paintings feature fragmentary glimpses of the vast landscape and "juxtapose cool hard granite, lush greenery and calm sky."

== Works in public collections ==
- Night Flowers (c. 1963-64), Housatonic Museum of Art, Bridgeport, CT
- Three Graces I (1967), National Museum of Women in the Arts, Washington, DC
- Self-Portrait in a Fur Hat (1968), Housatonic Museum of Art, Bridgeport, CT
- Seated Figure (1973), Brooklyn Museum, Brooklyn, NY
- Three Sisters III (1974), Hillwood Art Museum, Long Island University, C.W. Post Campus, Brookville, NY
- Beth (1976), Rowan University Art Gallery, Glassboro, NJ
- Frida Kahlo (1976), Rowan University Art Gallery, Glassboro, NJ
- Harold N. Proshansky (1992–93), Graduate Center, City University of New York, New York, NY
- "Three Graces", Norton Museum of Art, West Palm Beach, Florida
