= Organization of Pan Asian American Women =

The Organization of Pan Asian American Women is a public policy organization founded in 1976, which aims to address the concerns of Asian-Pacific American women, and to increase their participation in policy making and leadership. The influence of Pan Asian American Women working towards a common goal while raising awareness on issues affecting this intersectional group.

Shirley Hune explains in her Anthology on Asian America and Pacific Islander women about their contribution to a larger history. For Pan-Asian American women, it is important to emphasize expectations that pertains to inclusion and the unintentional racism that comes attached to the Anglo-Saxon connotation of an Asian in America. In search of scholarly articles on Pan Asian American Women, not much is written about the women who were put in detainment camps during WWII on Angel Island. Angel Island, much like Ellis Island in New York, is located in the San Francisco Bay area. Migrants from Asia would travel by boat to Angel Island in hopes of living the “American dream”. Once America became involved in WWII, news spread that the Japanese became allies for Germany. Americans threaten by the alliance caused plenty of Asians arriving to Angel Island then relocating to internment camps. In Hune's explanation, it becomes clear that there was a voice missing in the narrative of the women fugitives in camps. With new resurgence and insight to Second Wave feminism during the 1970s the Asian American/ Pacific Islander women reclaimed the idea of the roles these women had while in a state of oppression. Thus, the Organization of Pan Asian American Women emerged.
