= Sharon Wybrants =

American painter

Sharon Wybrants (born 1943 in Miami Beach, Florida) is an American painter, performance artist, and educator.

== Education and early career ==
Wybrants earned an AFA at Sullins College (1961–63), a BFA at Ohio Wesleyan University (1963–65), and an MA in Painting, Fine Art at Hunter College (1972–74). In 1973, using the married name Sharon Wybrants-Lynch, she was a founding artist-member of SOHO20 Gallery, the second all-women cooperative exhibition space in New York City. She remained with the gallery until 1978. Her first solo show at SOHO20, in December 1973, was favorably reviewed in Arts Magazine. She exhibited paintings and drawings of "vigorous, creative women whose faces defy any judgment based on culturally-defined standards of feminine beauty," including an expressive self-portrait called Revolutionary Woman (1973), which was later acquired by Western Illinois University. For her second solo exhibition at SOHO20, Wybrants showed painted "images of exaggerated feminine sensibility," and again received a positive review in Arts Magazine. Wybrants also exhibited in group shows, including The Eye of Woman (1974, Hobart and William Smith Colleges) and Year of the Woman (1975, Bronx Museum of the Arts). In 1974, she received the Childe Hassam Purchase Award from the American Academy of Arts and Letters.

== Self-portraits ==
In a group show at SOHO20 called Showing Off (1975), Wybrants exhibited Self-Portrait as Superwoman (Woman as Culture Hero) (1975), a ten-foot-high pastel study for a projected monumental oil painting that the critic John Perreault described as "more than slightly tongue-in-cheek. But it demonstrates that women artists have egos too, sometimes just as big as any man's. And why shouldn't they?" Also on view was another pastel, Wybrants's Self-Portrait in Superwoman Costume with Rauschenberg in the Background (1975), which humorously shows the artist with a picture of Robert Rauschenberg tacked to the wall behind her like a pin-up. The oil version of Self-Portrait as Superwoman (Woman as Culture Hero) (1977–78) was intended for The Sister Chapel, a collaborative feminist installation that celebrated eleven historic, mythical, and conceptual female "role models." Wybrants's self-portrait is a tribute to her own achievements as a woman and as an artist, but it was also intended to communicate something of the uncertainty and personal suffering behind the groundbreaking accomplishments of the feminist art movement. Although the original Self-Portrait as Superwoman disappeared in the 1980s and was probably destroyed, Wybrants recreated the painting for a new exhibition of The Sister Chapel at Rowan University Art Gallery in 2016.

In 1976, the pastel version of Self-Portrait as Superwoman was used as the image on a poster to promote an Equal Rights Amendment Work Conference sponsored by the New York chapter of the National Organization for Women. The pastel version was also exhibited a second time at SOHO20 in Superwoman, Beauty and the Beast, Wybrants's third solo show at the gallery. Also displayed was a series of twelve self-portraits that documented the year-long breakup of Wybrants's marriage, each reflecting "a different mood and a different way of seeing herself," as noted by the art critic Ellen Lubell. The paintings ranged from During the Separation (1976), which Marjorie Kramer likened to "a wild animal looking for possible dangers," to Cathartic Conversation with Al Hansen (1976), which is looser and far less constrained. Wybrants's twelve self-portraits were praised by reviewers in Arts Magazine, ARTnews, The Feminist Art Journal, Womanart, and The SoHo Weekly News.

== Performance art ==
Between 1978 and 1980, Wybrants created a number of performances in addition to working as a painter. Master Lady and Her Four Master Pieces (1980), for example, featured Wybrants being dragged around a stage by a group of young men on leashes who were wearing bondage-type costumes. For some of her performances, Wybrants collaborated with colleagues, including the artist and designer Dan Kainen.

== Later career ==
While living in Woodstock, New York between 1981 and 1984, Wybrants hosted a weekly cable television talk show called "Fire, It's a Verb." According to her, "While we talked, I'd draw my guest's pastel portrait that showed on the live video. It was a bit of a challenge to complete it in a half hour, to have it look good all the time, and conduct an interview." In 1990, Wybrants was the founding director of Challenged Artists Together, a non-profit art organization for children, adolescents, and adults with disabilities in Las Cruces, New Mexico. She taught studio art, digital art, and art history at the Berkshire School from 1997 until 2009. Between 1981 and 2012, her works were exhibited in Puerto Rico, New Mexico, Massachusetts, Illinois, New York, and Italy. In 2010, Wybrants was awarded an artist residency at the Millay Colony for the Arts. She continues to paint and still creates self-portraits, one of which was exhibited in Selfies & Self-Portraits: 21st C Artists See Themselves (2017) at Viridian Artists in New York City.
