= Juanita McNeely =

American feminist artist (1936–2023)

Juanita McNeely (March 13, 1936 – October 18, 2023) was an American feminist artist known for her bold works that illustrate the female experience in her nude figurative paintings, prints, paper cut-outs, and ceramic pieces. Feminist emotional elements in her work include the portrayal of female experiences such as abortion, rape, and menstruation. Her recurring health problems and expressive figurative compositions have prompted comparisons to Frida Kahlo. According to McNeely, "we as women must continue the struggle to hold on to our rights, or let the children lead the way."

== Early life ==
McNeely was born in Ferguson, Missouri on March 13, 1936 to Robert and Alta McNeely. In her early years, McNeely spent time at the Saint Louis Art Museum, where she saw works by Paul Gauguin, Henri Matisse, and the German Expressionists. At the age of 15, after winning an art scholarship for an oil painting, McNeely dedicated her life to art. She enrolled in the St. Louis School of Fine Arts at Washington University in St. Louis and began to study art. Under the careful eye of Werner Drewes, who served as her inspiration, McNeely began rigorous training in composition and technique. By her sophomore year, the professors allowed her to work without models at her request because of her intuitive knowledge of the human form. She graduated with her BFA in 1959.

After being hospitalized for a year in high school for excessive bleeding, McNeely was diagnosed with cancer in her first year of college, and given three to six months to live. She has identified this experience as the reason why she was unafraid to talk about "the things that are not necessarily pleasant." Another obstacle in her early years was sexism in the art world. She later recalled that an anatomy teacher pulled her aside during class and told her "Look, you will never make it as an artist...because you're too skinny and you don't look like a good f...k." This experience also contributed to the feminist themes in her work.

After a short hiatus in Mexico, McNeely began her graduate studies at Southern Illinois University, where she worked on a Happening with Allan Kaprow. She subsequently went to Chicago, where she persuaded the Art Institute of Chicago to give her a job while she continued to paint and exhibit in solo and group shows.

== Professional life ==
Woman's Psyche (1968) at the Rubell Museum DC in 2022

While at Southern Illinois University, McNeely decided that she was ready to go to New York City, where she moved in 1967 with her husband and opened a studio in the East Village. In 1968, she completed Woman's Psyche, a multi-panel work that Sharyn Finnegan has described as a "tragic vision of monthly bleeding." Maryse Holder characterized it an image of "an Everywoman deep with primal mysteries" in the " depths of the female experience."

In New York, McNeely's health deteriorated when another tumor was found. Because she was pregnant and abortion was then illegal, the doctors could do little to treat her. This adversity and lack of control over her own body fueled McNeely's feminism. She was one of the first to address the issue of abortion in her painting, Is it Real? Yes it is (1969).

Is it Real? Yes it is! (1969) at the Whitney Museum in 2023

In 1970, McNeely joined Prince Street Gallery, an artist's collective that exhibits contemporary abstract and figurative artists. It was established in Soho in 1970 as an outgrowth of the Alliance of Figurative Artists McNeely extensively exhibited at Prince Street Gallery in the 1970s, which gave her the artistic freedom to express what she needed to say as a woman artist. In 1970, she also moved into Westbeth, the affordable artist's residence in the West Village, where she would live for the rest of her life.

In 1975, McNeely was again diagnosed with cancer, which prompted her to remove material possessions and live lightly, which is echoed in the light colors and lone, simple figures that are found in her work of that period. Moving Through (1975) exemplifies this particular stage in McNeely's life and career. After divorcing her first husband, she met the sculptor Jeremy Lebensohn, whom she later married. From 1981 to 1982, they lived and traveled for six months in France, where McNeely suffered an accident that damaged her spinal cord and forced her to use a wheelchair. This disability inspired her to paint and make the "ugly and terrible beautiful for herself."

McNeely continued to exhibit late into her life, including in a solo exhibition at Brandeis University. Her exhibition, Indomitable Spirit, embodied the spirit and courage it took to challenge misogyny and patriarchy. McNeely has also become a spokesperson at all of the events of the International Organization of Jean Kennedy Smith and Ambassadors Wives under the auspices of Very Special Arts from 1990 until 1994, an organization that promotes access and visibility of the arts, and creates opportunities for disabled artists. She was the judge of an art exhibit held in honor of the 200th anniversary of the laying of the first corner stone of the White House at a ceremony for that exhibit at the White House. Also under the auspices of the VSA, McNeely was judge and teacher for the International Yamagata Art Program.

== Involvement in the Feminist Art Movement ==
McNeely showed Woman's Psyche (1968) in First Open Show of Feminist Art, an all-women exhibition that was organized by Marjorie Kramer. She also joined several feminist artist groups, including Women Artists in Revolution and the Redstockings. McNeely was also a member of the all-women cooperative gallery, SOHO 20 Gallery, where she had a solo show in 1980.

McNeely was an early member of Fight Censorship (est.1973), founded by Anita Steckel, a group of women artists who explored female sexuality and the erotic needs or experiences of women. Fight Censorship sought to change the conservative society that barred feminist artists from jobs and exhibitions. To accomplish this, they lectured and educated the public about erotic art and the negative effects of censorship.

== Themes ==
=== Eroticism ===
Many of McNeely's works center around erotic imagery. Her art takes a dark look at the violent and sometimes bloody sexual experiences of women. As suggested by Joseph Slade, the success of McNeely's erotic art can be shown by the efforts to censor it. Her art has been described as illustrating the fear in most women of "physical vulnerability, embodying all of [her] sexual functions and their possibly devastating consequences."

=== Women's experience ===
Another theme in McNeely's work is the female perspective. Her work focuses on the fact that sex is central to a woman's life but women are not allowed to comment on it. Her art shows the violence, torture, and pain of experiences in a woman's life such as abortion, rape, and menstruation. The notion that biology defines a woman's identity is also present. Chameleon (1970), for example, depicts a nude woman in vibrant colors lying on a table. She is sexual from her own perspective and active in her sexuality, which is clearly a female experience.

=== Nude/violence/pain ===
The nude paired with violence, pain, and blood is a recurring theme in McNeely's work. She relates to her audience by using the female nude as an active agent. She also uses her own experience and perspective as a woman to create a strong connection to the pain, blood, and violence that comes with birth and womanhood. In The Tearing, for example, a half skeletal woman gives birth surrounded by blood and gore, insinuating that birth is also a death. She also shows the pain and violence of motherhood in Delicate Balance (1970) by depicting a mother as a contorted, bleeding madwoman balancing on a tightrope.

== Death ==
McNeely died in her home in Manhattan, on October 18, 2023, at the age of 87.
