= Barbara Nessim =

American artist, illustrator and educator

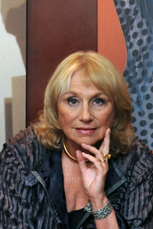
- Born: 1939 (age 86–87); New York City, New York
- Known for: Illustration, contemporary art, digital art
- Website: barbaranessim.com

Barbara Nessim (born 1939) is an American artist, illustrator, and educator whose work has played a significant role in expanding the boundaries between illustration, fine art, and digital media.

== Early life ==
Nessim was born in New York City in 1939. Motivated by art from a young age, she studied at the Pratt Institute in New York from 1956 to 1960. After graduating from Pratt she briefly worked in textile design while building her career as a freelance illustrator. Nessim received encouragement from her former teacher, Robert Weaver, to enter the Society of Illustrators 2nd annual competition in 1960 where she was awarded a Special Mention for a series of seven innovative monotype etchings titled, Man and Machine. One of these works was also the cover of Communication Arts Magazine's 2nd issue.

Nessim was immediately noticed by leading Art Directors of the day, notably Henry Wolf and Robert Benton from Esquire Magazine. Her illustration work continued to appear in magazines of the time, namely, Harpers Bazaar, Redbook, and the Ladies Home Journal, as well as "low brow" magazine titles such as, Escapade and Swank. Nessim's illustration work was always informed by the fine art that she continued to create for herself in her studio.

in the 1960's Nessim also designed her own line of clothing and engineered prints for Lady Van Husen which she named Lady Vantastic, all while continuing to create her fine art, along with illustrations for magazines.

By the 1970's she was designing and illustrating posters for many clients, including Lincoln Center. She also embarked on designing a line of shoes in 1973 for the Carber Shoe Company in Italy.

== Career ==
Nessim was one of very few full-time professional women illustrators working in the United States during the 1960s; she was able to carve a niche for her work in the competitive graphic design field, illustrating record album covers, calendars, and magazine covers for major publications such as Rolling Stone, Time, Ms, New York Magazine, The Boston Globe, Show and Audience. She established her own graphic design firm in 1980, Nessim and Associates, with a group of fellow illustrators to work on corporate projects.

Nessim produced many works in ink and watercolor, and later incorporating computer graphics into her arsenal of mediums she mastered. She has been teaching computer art since 1980. Nessim has taught at the School of Visual Arts, Fashion Institute of Technology, and Pratt Institute, all in New York.

Her works have been exhibited worldwide, including at the Kunst Museum and The Louvre. The Museum of Modern Art in Sweden, Smithsonian Institution in Washington, DC, the Victoria and Albert Museum, and the Hungarian National Gallery in Budapest all hold work of hers in their permanent collections.

Nessim’s art resides in permanent collections at The Whitney Museum of American Art (NY), Los Angeles County Museum of Art (CA), DePaul Museum of Art (IL), School of Visual Arts (NY), Victoria and Albert Museum (UK), Szépmüvészeti Museum (HU), The World Trade Center observation deck -- pre 09/11/01 (NY), National Portrait Gallery (DC), The Louvre (France), The Cooper Hewitt Museum (NY), the Smithsonian Institution (NY), The Museum of Modern Art - Lund Konsthall (Sweden), Arizona State University (AZ), The Henry Babbage Library Art Gallery at University of Connecticut (CT), High Point University (NC).

Nessim has been the subject of solo exhibitions at institutions and galleries such as The DePaul Museum of Art (IL), Derek Eller Gallery (NY), The National Arts Club (NY), The Phi Centre (Quebec), Little Big Man Gallery (CA), Bard Graduate Center (NY), Rodale Building Lobby Gallery (NY), Conde Nast (NY), DFN Gallery (NY), Sienna Patti Gallery (MA), Bitforms Gallery (NY), Centro Colombo-Americano (Columbia), Adams Landing Art Center (NY), Sangre de Cristo Arts Center (CO), Grace Gallery (NY), Shiseido Ginza Gallery (Japan), Coors Gallery (CO), The Benson Gallery (MA), Corridor Gallery (PA)

== Digital art pioneer ==
Barbara Nessim was one of the first artists to seriously pursue digital art and illustration. In 1980 she was invited to participate in the Massachusetts Institute of Technology's Visible Language Workshop (VLW), a program designed to carry out experiments for advanced graphics research. Nessim was unable to attend the VLW, but her conversations with MIT staff about the possibilities of computer-generated art intrigued her. As a result, she searched for a computer to work on near her home in New York City. Nessim found a sympathetic sponsor at Time Incorporated's Time Video Information Services (TVIS). Time had computers and invited her to be an Artist in Residence. She was “allowed to work on the computers from 5 p.m. to 9 a.m., and went there for a period of two years until 1983.” Using manuals to teach herself to navigate the complicated programs, she became proficient at creating computer art and assembled an impressive body of digital work. Since then Nessim has used the computer in her work as an artist, illustrator, teacher, and innovator. Digital technology has provided new ways to create and exhibit her work, including “35mm slides, CIBA-chromes, videos, early non-archival inkjet prints, Polaroid, as well as pastel hand-colored tiled larger artworks, 3-D Stereo-pair works, very large modular works hand-painted with acrylics, unique archival inkjet prints printed on canvas, and ‘randomly’ moving software art shown on a wall-mounted monitor.” Her 1991 Random Access Memories (RAM) show at the Rempire Gallery in NYC had, as part of the larger exhibition, an installation where the participants could produce and take away their own unique catalog of Nessim's work. it predicted the widespread digital "print on demand" industry that is changing the nature of publishing as we know it. In 2009 Nessim launched The Model Project, a “cutting edge view of fashion’s hold on women” expressed in a series of large scale collages printed digitally on aluminum panels. The two-year project was a collaboration with a photographer, who photographed a fashion model in Nessim’s Manhattan studio loft. Nessim deconstructed the images, “juxtaposing cutouts of lips, hair, breasts and legs with jewelry and clothes to re-examine prevailing ideas about desire, beauty, fashion and commerce.” Nessim’s permanent installation, Chronicles of Beauty (an extension of The Model Project) was commissioned for New York City’s Eventi Hotel. Its central piece, A Current Past, is a 28' x 12' digital print on aluminum. Although she is smitten with digital technology, Nessim has not abandoned hands-on painting and drawing skills. She has employed both traditional and digital methods to produce her work: “I love working hands-on and I love working with the computer. They are two very different things. It would all depend on the approach I wanted to take for each artwork I was doing.” She acknowledged the difficulties illustrators have faced in adapting to the technology in a 2003 interview: “it is challenging to be constantly learning something new all the time. It is a bottomless pit. But that said, using new cutting edge tools and media opens up the creative process to new possibilities you cannot achieve using traditional methods.”

In early 2013, the Victoria & Albert Museum opened an extensive retrospective entitled Barbara Nessim, An Artful Life. The exhibition spanned Nessim’s works from the 1960s to the 2000s, and it also included an interview with the artist. All of the hundred artworks shown became part of the V&A's permanent collection. A book of the same title, published by Abrams, was released in February 2013. The V&A display traveled to the Bard Graduate Center Gallery in New York City (9/15/2014 - 1/11/2015), where the curator, Douglas Dodds, vastly expanded the show's scope to occupy 3 floors of the gallery. Nessim also recorded a commentary for many of the works in the exhibition, and this was made available online.

== Publications ==
Nessim's work has been published in several books, which include:

- David Galloway, ed. Barbara Nessim: An Artful Life (New York: Abrams / London: Victoria and Albert Museum, 2013)
- Sketchbook 66 (Nessim & Associates, 2010, ISBN 9780982236703)
- Barbara Nessim: Black Truths, White Lies : Interactive Installation, Wall Pieces, Projections, Web-casting (Bitforms Gallery, 2003)
- Sketchbook Selections: 1996-2005 (Nessim & Associates, 2007, ISBN 9780980207811)
- Barbara Nessim: Random Access Memories : an Interactive Computer Art Exhibition (Sangre De Cristo Arts and Conference Center, 1991)
- Sketch Book (Barbara Nessim, 1975)
