= Judith Bernstein =

American visual artist (born 1942)

- Born: October 14, 1942 (age 84); Newark, New Jersey, U.S.
- Notable work: Screw Drawings
- Website: judithbernstein.com

Judith Bernstein (born October 14, 1942) is a New York artist best known for her phallic drawings and paintings. Bernstein uses her art as a vehicle for her outspoken feminist and anti-war activism, provocatively drawing psychological links between the two. Her best-known work features her iconic motif of an anthropomorphized screw, which has become the basis for a number of allegories and visual puns. During the beginning of the Feminist Art Movement, Bernstein was a founding member of the all-women's cooperative A.I.R. Gallery in New York.

Bernstein spent many years teaching in the School of Art+Design at SUNY Purchase College, where she is Professor Emerita. Her classes there focused on "outrageous, outscale" drawing, as well as drawing the figure. After retiring from SUNY Purchase, she experienced a rediscovery late in her career, as highlighted in her New York Magazine's 2015 profile titled "Judith Bernstein, an art star at last at 72". She has addressed the topic of her rediscovery in an interview with The New York Times, stating: "I call it a rebirth."

Throughout her life, Bernstein has also been involved in the Guerilla Girls, Art Workers' Coalition, and Fight Censorship Group. Her work is in the collection of the Museum of Modern Art, Whitney Museum of American Art, Brooklyn Museum, Jewish Museum, Carnegie Museum, Neuberger Museum, Migros Museum Zürich, Kunsthaus Zürich, Deste Foundation for Contemporary Art, Andy Hall Foundation, Alex Katz Foundation, and Verbund Collection.

== Personal life ==
Bernstein was born into a Jewish family in Newark, New Jersey, in 1942. Her mother was a bookkeeper and her father was a teacher. She learned about painting from her father, who painted with his friends in their basement. She earned her Master of Fine Arts and Bachelor of Fine Arts degrees from Yale University. Bernstein recalls: "Jack Tworkov, the head of the art department, said to me on the first day, 'We cannot place you.' Meaning that after I left Yale, I wouldn't get a job." At that time, women were rarely placed in university positions. Prior to studying at Yale University, Bernstein received a M.Ed. and B.S. at the Pennsylvania State University.

== Career ==
Throughout Bernstein's work there is playfulness within the repetition of a motif. Bernstein’s early drawings and paintings were influenced by both graffiti in men's bathrooms at Yale University and her view that paternalistic leadership resulted in the Vietnam War. She became fascinated with graffiti after reading an article in The New York Times in the 1960s about Edward Albee taking the title Who's Afraid of Virginia Woolf? from bathroom graffiti. In discussing these images, Bernstein has stated: "I realized that graffiti has psychological depth because when someone’s alone and releasing on the toilet, they’re also releasing from the subconscious. I began to use text like 'this may not be heaven but Peter hangs out here' in my drawings and paired it with crude images." Fun Gun (1967) is a painting of an anatomical phallus shooting bullets. The same year she created the Union Jack-Off series, made with charcoal and oil stick on paper. It features two phalluses in the shape of an X within the American flag with the words "Jack Off on U.S Policy in Vietnam."

Bernstein's most well-known artworks are her subsequent series of biomorphic screw drawings, which she began in 1969. These monumental pieces provocatively appropriate the image of the screw as a phallic symbol of oppression—as in the expression "being screwed"—and evoke ominous power. One of these works, Horizontal (1973), was censored from the exhibition "Focus: Women's Work— American Art in 1974" at the Museum of the Philadelphia Civic Center for "lacking redeeming social value", phraseology commonly applied to pornography. At the time, a petition letter was issued in protest, signed by many significant artists, critics, and curators, including Clement Greenberg, Linda Nochlin, Lucy Lippard, Louise Bourgeois, and the New Museum's Founding Director, Marcia Tucker.

Bernstein is an active feminist and founding member of the women's cooperative A.I.R. Gallery in New York. The A.I.R. Gallery gave Bernstein the first solo exhibition slot in 1973. In 1975 Bernstein was a panelist for a radio program about women "erotic" artists for WBAI-New York, where she discussed her experiences creating and showing her work. From 1981 to 1984 Bernstein created charcoal drawings of Venus in sexualized shapes, the series was called Anthurium Thru Venus. She continued to make art of phalluses, and in 1993 she created a painting called The Dance of large dancing phalluses referencing Matisse's Dance.

Because of pervasive sexism in the art industry, it was difficult to land exhibition engagements, and Bernstein had a hard time gaining recognition for her artwork until the 21st century. Some of her solo exhibitions include: Judith Bernstein at The Mitchell Algus Gallery in New York (2008), Signature Piece at Alex Zachary in New York (2010), four solo exhibitions at The Box LA (2009 - 2017), Birth of the Universe under blacklight at Gavin Brown's Enterprise in New York (2014), Judith Bernstein at Karma International in Zürich (2014), and Voyeur at the Mary Boone Gallery in New York (2015), which featured her Birth of the Universe series. In this exhibition, female genitalia filled the canvas, Bernstein employed an in-your-face and direct approach. Fluorescent color and rich oil paint portrayed the chaos and nuclear explosion that is the Big Bang with rage and the expanding universe. She has been included in numerous group exhibitions, including: The Comfort of Strangers at MoMA PS1 (2010), The Last Newspaper at the New Museum (2010), The Historical Box at Hauser & Wirth (Zürich in 2011 and London in 2012), Keep Your Timber Limber at ICA London (2013), and Toys Redux at Migros Museum in Zürich (2015). In 2012, the New Museum was the first museum to give Bernstein a solo exhibition. It was mini-retrospective titled Judith Bernstein: Hard, in which Bernstein scrawled her name on a glass wall from floor to ceiling. “It's about ego, male posturing, and also my own ego," she told New York Magazine.

In 2016, Bernstein had two solo shows; Dicks of Death at Mary Boone Gallery in New York City and Rising at the Kunsthall Stavanger in Norway, along with the launch of her artist catalogue, Judith Bernstein Rising (Mousse Publishing). Both of her 2016 solo exhibitions received critical acclaim. In a review of Dicks of Death, Art Observed stated: "The exhibition has a unique focus on delivering Bernstein’s new body of work alongside a selection of historic pieces from the ‘60s and ‘70s, when politics related to the civilian body were making headlines, especially in relation to the protests over the Vietnam War and the resultant force expended on the populace. Viewing Bernstein’s large-scale paintings, one finds it challenging to distinguish between her older and current works, both in style and content. Signifying the artist’s decades of resilient and enduring practice, this note additionally affirms how little progression has been made regarding the issues Bernstein has been tackling, even if the scenes and players have changed." She also launched her first artist book titled Dicks of Death in collaboration with Edition Patrick Frey and received the prestigious John Simon Guggenheim Fellowship for Fine Arts in 2016 .

She lives and works in New York City. Her image is included in the iconic 1972 poster Some Living American Women Artists by Mary Beth Edelson.
