= May Stevens =

American artist, educator, writer, and political activist (1924–2019)

- Born: June 9, 1924; Boston, Massachusetts, U.S.
- Died: December 9, 2019 (aged 95); Santa Fe, New Mexico, U.S.
- Education: Massachusetts College of Art; Art Students League; Académie Julian
- Known for: Painting; Prints
- Notable work: Big Daddy series (1968–1976); History Paintings series (1974–1981); Ordinary/Extraordinary series (1976–1991); Sea of Words series (1990)
- Movement: Feminist art

May Stevens (June 9, 1924 – December 9, 2019) was an American feminist artist, political activist, educator, and writer.

== Early life and education ==
May Stevens was born in Boston to working-class parents, Alice Dick Stevens and Ralph Stanley Stevens, and grew up in Quincy, Massachusetts. She had one brother, Stacey Dick Stevens, who died of pneumonia at the age of fifteen. By Stevens's account, her father expressed his racism at home but "never said these things publicly, nor did he act on them—to my knowledge. But he said them over and over."

Stevens earned a B.F.A. at the Massachusetts College of Art (1946), and studied at the Académie Julian in Paris (1948) and Art Students League in New York City (1948). She was granted an MFA equivalency by the New York City Board of Education in 1960 and was a postdoctoral fellow at the Bunting Institute of Radcliffe College in 1988–89. In 1948 she married Rudolf Baranik (1920-1998), with whom she had one child.

== Activism ==
Stevens' artwork frequently reflects her personal experiences and history. One instance of this is her "Sisters of the Revolution" series (1973-1976), which was inspired by her family's history of radical activism. The series portrays women from various historical periods who participated in revolutionary struggles, and Stevens utilized her family photographs as references for her paintings. Through this artwork, Stevens aimed to shed light on the significant yet frequently overlooked roles that women have played in political movements. Stevens was a founding member of the feminist group the Guerrilla Girls.

== Work ==
Over the course of her career, Stevens tended to work in series. Her body of work divides into several periods, each characterized by a particular theme or concern. She said that she "start[s] with an idea and I always have more to say about it." While her political commitment drove her earlier work, her later works tend to be lyrical.Stevens' artwork was shaped by various political and social movements such as feminism, civil rights, and anti-war activism, which she actively participated in. Her experiences as an activist were reflected in her art. For instance, Stevens' focus on women's experiences in her artwork was influenced by her feminist activism, while her works criticizing American foreign policy were a result of her anti-war activism. Stevens' artwork is an important contribution to the feminist art movement of the 1970s, and that it helped to expand the definition of what was considered "art." Moreover, her use of autobiography and personal experience in her art. Stevens often incorporated elements of her own life into her art, such as images of her family members, personal belongings, and places she had lived. She also used her own experiences to address broader social and political issues.

=== Freedom Riders ===
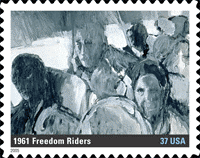
A painting by May Stevens on a 2005 stamp of the United States

The first series influenced by her political awareness is a group of paintings called Freedom Riders exhibited in 1963 at the Roko Gallery in New York. At her husband's request Martin Luther King, Jr. agreed to sign his name to the catalog's forward, in which the Freedom Riders' actions were praised as deserving mention in song and painting. These are the first works by Stevens in which her political awareness influenced the subject of her paintings. Based on the Freedom Riders, civil rights activists who challenged segregation in the South through riding segregated buses and registering voters, Freedom Riders, a haunting black and white lithograph of individual portraits, was also the title of a work in this exhibition. Although Stevens did not participate in their activities she strongly supported the Civil rights movement, and had taken part in protests in Washington, DC. In another work in the exhibition, Honor Roll (1963), the names of James Meredith, Harvey Gantt, and five other African American men, women, and children who were active in attempts to integrate schools in the South are scratched on the surface as if they were listed on a school's honor roll for academic distinction, Most of Stevens's Freedom Riders paintings were based images in newspapers and on television.

=== Big Daddy ===
Stevens created her Big Daddy series between 1967 and 1976, coinciding with the U.S. escalation of involvement in Vietnam. The image of "Big Daddy" is based on a painting she made of her father watching television in his undershirt in 1967 The series features images of her own father, as well as historical figures such as Joseph Stalin and Adolf Hitler, and includes text that critiques patriarchal power structures. Although the Big Daddy figure was initially inspired by Stevens' anger towards her father, whom she has characterized as an ordinary working-class man, with pro-war, pro-establishment, anti-Semitic, and profoundly racist attitudes, ultimately the figure became transmuted into a more universal symbol of patriarchal imperialism. In expansive, predominantly red, white and blue images that show the influence of Pop Art, she created a homogenized, phallic, ignorant, male persona that acted as a visual metaphor for all that she felt was hypocritical and unjust in the patriarchal power dynamics of family life. Stevens showed her metaphoric 'Big Daddy' in many guises. In Big Daddy Paper Doll (1970), he is centrally seated holding a pug dog on his lap, surrounded by an array of cut-out costumes: an executioner, soldier, policeman, and butcher. Although the bullet shaped head and bulldog on his lap exaggerate his potential violence and power, through the metaphor of the cut-out, Stevens contains his potency. In Pax Americana 1973, he sits helmet on head, pug dog on lap, as if clothed in the stars and stripes of the flag. Her work held a questioning mirror up to many Americans and what she considered to be their unconsidered positions on racial and sexually equality and foreign policy.

=== Feminist Historical Revisions ===
SoHo Women Artists (1977-1978) at the National Museum of Women in the Arts in 2023

During the early through mid 1970s, Stevens became increasingly involved in feminist political activities, making the connection between women's struggle against oppression and the civil rights and anti-war movements. As in her previous work, her political awareness was reflected in her art. After reading Linda Nochlin's essay "Why Have There Been No Great Women Artists?," Stevens became interested in Artemisia Gentileschi, and in 1976 she painted a nine-foot portrait of Artemisia Gentileschi for a feminist collaborative installation called The Sister Chapel. Between 1974 and 1981, Stevens created three large pictures that she called History Paintings. The series' title refers to the academic tradition of history painting but Stevens reconfigured art historical tropes from the perspective of her own life and other women artists to whom she was connected, drawing upon both her personal and political history In Artist's Studio (After Courbet), 1974 she placed herself in front of one of her Big Daddy paintings, in the pivotal position held by Courbet in his work, The Painter's Studio. Soho Women Artists (1977–78) is a group portrait of women in Stevens's political and artistic circle, including Lucy R. Lippard, Miriam Schapiro, Joyce Kozloff, and Harmony Hammond, who along with Stevens were among the founders of the Heresies Collective, which also, from 1977 to 1983, published the journal "Heresies: A feminist publication on arts and politics." Mysteries and Politics (1978), is reminiscent of a sacred conversation, in this case between thirteen women who influenced Stevens in their efforts to integrate their feminist politics, creativity, and family life.

=== Ordinary/Extraordinary ===
In her next series, Ordinary/Extraordinary, painted between 1976 and 1978, Stevens juxtaposed two women - Alice Stevens, her working-class, Irish Catholic mother and Rosa Luxembourg, the Polish Marxist philosopher and social activist, in order to compare, contrast, and ultimately find resonances between these two seemingly different women and their differing life paths - one private, in which her own interests were ignored, and the other public, yet whose powerful ideas and presence ultimately led to her destruction. Specifically, she wanted to "erode the polarized notion that one woman's life was special and the other forgettable." The figures had appeared together in two previous works, a collage originally published in Heresies, and in the painting Mysteries and Politics, discussed above. The works in this series are large and powerful. In Go Gentle (1983) constructed through a cascade of photographs, Stevens in her presentation of her mother who seems to press against the plane of the canvas, echoes but contradicts Dylan Thomas' wish for his father to "not go gentle into that good night." Alice alone is the subject of the monumental five-paneled Alice in the Garden, where she holds a bunch of dandelions, which Stevens' describes having thrown at her when she visited her mother at the nursing home where she spent her last years.

=== Later works: Sea of Words, Bodies of Water ===
Water was an important element of Stevens last two series, Sea of Words (begun in 1990), and Rivers and Other Bodies of Water (begun in 2001). By the 1990s, Stevens began to use words in her works; as she said, "words are everywhere." In the painting Sea of Words (1990–91), four luminous, wraithlike boats float on a glimmering "sea" constructed through semi-readable lines of flowing words, taken from the writings of both Virginia Woolf and Julia Kristeva. In her later works water itself became a major theme, as in Three Boats On a Green Sea (1999). Throughout her life water was special and evocative to her - she has written of the experience of swimming as a child and also the poem "Standing in A River" as an adult, in which she describes minnows swimming around her legs. The water is also a way of expressing grief for her lost loved ones, whose ashes she scattered in rivers, her son, her mother, and her husband.

== Exhibitions and recognition ==
In 1999, the Museum of Fine Arts, Boston, had a major retrospective of her work, entitled Images of Women Near and Far 1983-1997, the museum's first exhibition for a living female artist.

One of Stevens' Freedom Riders series was selected to illustrate the 1961 Freedom Riders in a 2005 panel of United States postage stamps called, "To Form a More Perfect Union." The panel of 37 cent stamps commemorated ten major milestones of the Civil Rights Movement with artwork from different artists.

Her solo exhibition in 2006 at the Minneapolis Institute of Art traveled to Springfield Museum of Art, MO and National Museum of Women in the Arts, Washington, DC. Stevens’ work is in numerous museum collections, including the British Museum, the Brooklyn Museum, the Cleveland Museum, The Fogg Art Museum, the Metropolitan Museum of Art, the Museum of Fine Arts, Boston, The Museum of Modern Art, New York, National Academy of Design, NY, National Museum of Women in the Arts, San Francisco Museum of Modern Art, Hood Museum of Art at Dartmouth College, and Whitney Museum of American Art. Stevens' work was included in the 2022 exhibition Women Painting Women at the Modern Art Museum of Fort Worth.

In 2023, the MassArt Art Museum (MAAM), at the Massachusetts College of Art and Design in Boston, opened May Stevens: My Mothers, a major career retrospective after the artist's passing in 2019. The show explored Stevens's interest in portraying her mother in juxtaposition with the image of Polish-German activist Rosa Luxemburg.
