= Maureen Connor =

American artist

- Born: 1947 (age 78–79); Baltimore, MD
- Education: Pratt Institute, 1973, MFA; College of New Rochelle, BA
- Known for: Installation, Video, Performance
- Awards: New York Foundation for the Arts, Smithsonian Research Fellow, Anonymous Was a Woman, National Endowment for the Arts, John Simon Guggenheim Memorial Foundation
- Website: www.maureenconnor.net

Maureen Connor (born 1947) is an American artist who creates installations and videos dealing with human resources and social justice. She is known internationally for her work from the 1980s to the present, which focuses on gender and its modes of representation.

Her work has been shown at MAK, Vienna; Portikus, Frankfurt; ICA, Philadelphia; and the Whitney Biennial among other venues. She has received grants from the Guggenheim Foundation, National Endowment for the Arts, New York State Council on the Arts, New York Foundation for the Arts and Professional Staff Congress of the City University of New York. She is Emeritus Professor of Art at Queens College, City University of New York (1990-2014), and a co-founder of Social Practice Queens, an experimental art program sponsored by Queens College and the Queens Museum of Art.

== Artwork ==
Since 2000, Connor has been developing Personnel, a series of interventions concerned with the art institution as a workplace, which explore the attitudes, needs and desires of the staff at various institutions. Personnel and related projects have been produced for a diverse group of venues that include, among others, Periferic 8 Biennial for Contemporary Art, Romania; the Department of Art and Design, University of Michigan, Ann Arbor, 2008; Glyndor Gallery, Wave Hill, Bronx, NY, 2006; Wyspa Art Institute, Gdańsk, Poland, 2004–7; Tapies Foundation, Barcelona, 2003; and the Queens Museum of Art, New York, 2001. She is currently working on an installation of Personnel for the Centre de Recherche en Droit Public, a think tank at the University of Montreal, as well as a book on Personnel to be published jointly by Wyspa Art Institute, Gdańsk, Poland, and Revolver Press, Frankfurt, Germany. In 2022 along with artist Landon Newton and architect Kadambari Baxi, Connor created Trigger Planting, a site-specific installation exhibited at Frieze NY, in May of 2022. The work incorporated abortifacient and emmenagogue herbs planted above the 26 United States with trigger laws, near-total bans, six-week bans, and or State constitutional amendments that prohibit protections on abortion, all of which would go into effect should Roe v. Wade be overturned. The work was presented by A.I.R. Gallery in partnership with National Women’s Liberation.

== Notable exhibitions ==
Connor's film, Appetites and Desires, was screened at the Museum of Modern Art, New York, in 1996. Her work has been presented in solo exhibitions in the U.S. at the Queens Museum, New York (2000–01); Alternative Museum, New York (1994-5); Wave Hill, Bronx, NY (2006); Institute of Contemporary Art, Philadelphia (1997); and other venues. International solo shows include Contradictions at the Akbank Sanat in Istanbul, Turkey (2012); Evidence, at the Museo de Arte Moderno, Buenos Aires, Argentina (1998); Maureen Connor at Galerie Sima in Nuremberg, Germany (1996); and others. Connor has had solo exhibitions at Acquavella Galleries, New York, NY; Curt Marcus Gallery, New York, NY; and PPOW Gallery, New York, NY.

Artworks and films by Connor have been shown in venues across the U.S. and Europe. In 2012, she exhibited It's the Political Economy, Stupid, at the Austrian Cultural Institute in New York, NY. At Alternativa in Gdańsk, Poland, she exhibited Materiality in 2012; at the same venue, in 2011, she showed Labor and Leisure. Also in 2011, Imaginary Archive was presented at Gallery 12 in Galway, Ireland. In 2010, Connor showed The Visible Vagina at David Noland Gallery and Wellington Collaboratorium: Imaginary Archive at Enjoy Gallery in Wellington, New Zealand. Addressing Identities was exhibited at the Katonah Museum of Art in Katonah, NY in 2009; and Uncle Bob's Variety Show in Off the Wall was exhibited at The Jewish Museum in New York City in 2008. Also in 2008, Connor had videos screened in the Örebro International Video Art Festival, Örebro Lans Museum, Örebro, Sweden.

In 2007, Connor participated in the Disonancifas: Artists Collaborations with Industry, a project in San Sebastian, Spain. Her work Re-Vision appeared at the Edith-Rus Haus für Medienkunst in Oldenburg, Germany, in 2006. Also in 2006, Feeding Desire was presented at the Cooper Hewitt Museum in New York, NY. Prior to that her work was included in Inside Out Loud at the Kemper Art Museum in 2005 and Corpus—Women Artists and Embodiment at the Limerick City Gallery of Art in 2004. Her animation work was shown in Animations, an exhibition held at the Kunst-werke Berlin e.V. in 2003; Banquette at Palau Virrena, Barcelona, Spain, in 2003; and ZKM | Center for Art and Media Karlsruhe, Germany. Connor's work was included in Mirror, Mirror at Mass MOCA in 2002; Foundation Tapies, Barcelona, in 2002; and the Consejeria de las Artes/Sala Plaza España, Madrid, also in 2002.

In the 1990s, Connor's work was shown widely. It appeared at Zentrum für Kunst und Mediatechnologie, Karlsruhe, Germany; Paco das Artes (in conjunction with the 1998 São Paulo Biennale), São Paulo, Brazil; Neue Gesellschaft für Bildende Kunst, Berlin, Germany; Museum für Angewandte Kunst, Vienna, Austria; The Armand Hammer Museum, Los Angeles, CA; and numerous other venues. In 1997, her work was featured in the exhibition, Queens Artists: Highlights of the 20th Century, at the Queens Museum of Art, Flushing Meadow, New York.

== Awards and honors ==
Connor has received numerous honors and awards for her work. She was awarded a Smithsonian Artist Research Fellowship (2011), and an Anonymous Was a Woman Award (2010). In 2000, she was artist in residence at Harvestworks Digital Media Arts, where she worked on video projects. In the same year, she received a NYSCA Media Project Grant for her work, Personnel, at the Queens Museum of Art and a NYSCA Finishing Funds Award for Growing Older at Queens Museum of Art. In 1999, she received an Individual Artists Fellowship from the New York Foundation for the Arts, and in 1995-96 a grant from the National Endowment for the Arts. The John Simon Guggenheim Memorial Foundation awarded Connor with a fellowship in 1995. During the years of 1991 through 2003, she received several PSC CUNY Grants, from the Research Foundation, of the City University of New York. In 1988, Connor was a visiting artist in residence at the New York Experimental Glass Workshop (now known as UrbanGlass).

== Thinner Than You (1990) ==
In the form of a sculpted dress, this artwork is 60 x 7.5 inches. Connor's thin, twisted dress sends a message about the notion of "skinny". Connor explores the guilt that some women may feel regarding their weight and the culture's view of perfect shape. Thinner Than You is against thinness and makes its questions its positive value. Thinner Than You shows various meanings in relation to the female body represented by Connor's dress sculpture. The empty dress can be interpreted to mean an "empty vessel".
