= List of feminist artists =

This is a list of feminist artists. The list includes artists who have played a role in the feminist art movement which largely stemmed from second-wave feminism.

== A ==
- Pacita Abad (1946–2004)
- Lida Abdul (born 1973)
- Marina Abramović (born 1946)
- Eija-Liisa Ahtila (born 1959)
- Peggy Ahwesh (born 1954)
- Jerri Allyn (born 1954)
- Ghada Amer (born 1963)
- Grimanesa Amorós (born 1962)
- Alice Anderson (born 1972)
- Nancy Angelo (born 1953)
- Eleanor Antin (born 1935)
- Janine Antoni (born 1964)
- Ida Applebroog (born 1929–2023)
- Mireille Astore (born 1961)
- Dotty Attie (born 1938)
- Helene Aylon (1931–2020)
- Belkis Ayón (1967-1999)
- Nancy Azara (born 1939)

== B ==
- Judy Baca (born 1946)
- Alison Bechdel (born 1960)
- Susan Bee (born 1952)
- María Luisa Bemberg (born 1995)
- Lynda Benglis (born 1941)
- Siona Benjamin (born 1960)
- Zarina Bhimji (born 1963)
- Anna Biller (born 1965)
- Phyllis Birkby (1932–1994)
- Dara Birnbaum (born 1946)
- Rocío Boliver (born 1956)
- Lizzie Borden (born 1958)
- Andrea Bowers (born 1965)
- Sonia Boyce (born 1962)
- Shary Boyle (born 1972)
- Phyllis Bramson (born 1941)
- Catherine Breillat (born 1948)
- Barbara Leoff Burge
- Marsha Burns (born 1945)
- Maris Bustamante (born 1949)
- Sheila Levrant de Bretteville (born 1940)
- Tiffany Lee Brown (born 1973)

== C ==
- Claude Cahun (1894–1954)
- Susana Campos (born 1942)
- María Magdalena Campos Pons (born 1959)
- Tammy Rae Carland (born 1965)
- Elizabeth Catlett (1915–2012)
- Helen Chadwick (1953–1996)
- Patty Chang (born 1972)
- Sarah Charlesworth (1947–2013)
- Shu Lea Cheang (born 1954)
- Judy Chicago (born 1939)
- Filiz Cicek
- Minna Citron (1896–1991)
- Tee Corinne (1943–2006)
- Michèle Cournoyer (born 1943)
- Renée Cox (born 1960)
- Enid Crow (born 1968)
- Nancy Cusick (1924–2010)

== D ==
- Max Dashu
- Nancy Davidson
- Vanessa Davis
- Diane DiMassa
- Kim Dingle
- Alejandra Dorado
- Orshi Drozdik
- Marlene Dumas
- Rachel Blau DuPlessis

== E ==
- Mary Beth Edelson
- Laurie Toby Edison
- Kari Edwards
- Tracey Emin
- Paz Errázuriz
- Bracha L. Ettinger
- Valie Export

== F ==
- Deej Fabyc
- Joyce Farmer
- Christina Fernandez
- Carole Feuerman
- Karen Finley
- Louise Fishman
- Audrey Flack
- Andrea Fraser
- Helen C. Frederick

== G ==
- Regina José Galindo
- Chitra Ganesh
- Cheri Gaulke
- Yishay Garbasz
- Eunice Golden
- Sarah Beth Goncarova
- Nancy Graves
- Jill Greenberg
- Lauren Greenfield
- Wynne Greenwood
- Roberta Gregory
- Grimes
- Lourdes Grobet
- Guerrilla Girls

== H ==
- Jasmin Hagendorfer
- Barbara Hammer
- Harmony Hammond
- Kathleen Hanna
- Karin Hannak
- Margaret Harrison
- Mary Harron
- Carla Harryman
- Faye HeavyShield
- Mercedes Helnwein
- Audrey Hemenway
- Lynn Hershman Leeson
- Eva Hesse
- Hannah Höch
- Hannah Holliday Stewart
- Jenny Holzer
- Rebecca Horn
- Irma Hünerfauth

== I ==
- Graciela Iturbide
- Neema Iyer

== J ==
- Mablen Jones
- Miranda July

== K ==
- Frida Kahlo
- Ann Kalmbach
- Vena Kava
- Mary Kelly
- Tatana Kellner
- Swati Khurana
- Vera Klement
- Anastasia Klose
- Kiki Kogelnik
- Joyce Kozloff
- Louise Kramer
- Barbara Kruger
- Yayoi Kusama

== L ==
- Natalia LL
- Suzanne Lacy
- Magali Lara
- Maria Lassnig
- Louise Lawler
- LasTesis
- Phoebe Legere
- Peta Lily
- Jia-Jen Lin
- Jacqueline Livingston
- Llanakila
- Irene Loughlin
- Mina Loy
- Lea Lublin

== M ==
- Sue Maberry
- Mail Order Brides
- Sarah Maple
- Liliana Maresca
- María Evelia Marmolejo
- Petra Mattheis
- Monica Mayer
- Rosemary Mayer
- Juanita McNeely
- Mary Meigs
- Ana Mendieta
- Marisa Merz
- Susan Michod
- Kate Millett
- Hayao Miyazaki
- Tracey Moberly
- Chantal Montellier
- Charlotte Moorman
- Ree Morton
- Ruth Mountaingrove
- Prema Murthy

== N ==
- Alice Neel
- Carol Heifetz Neiman
- Senga Nengudi
- Shirin Neshat
- Hương Ngô
- Polly Nor
- Patsy Norvell

== O ==
- Hildegard Ochse
- Lorraine O’Grady
- Yoko Ono
- Catherine Opie
- Orlan
- Tanja Ostojić

== P ==
- Julieta Paredes
- Marion Peck
- Irene Peslikis
- Howardena Pindell
- Adrian Piper
- Polvo de Gallina Negra
- Reeva Potoff

== R ==
- Arlene Raven
- Faith Ringgold
- Trina Robbins
- Rachel Rosenthal
- Martha Rosler
- Alexandra Rubinstein

== S ==
- Zilia Sánchez
- Jenny Saville
- Miriam Schapiro
- Mary Schepisi
- Carolee Schneemann
- Anne Seagrave
- Joan Semmel
- Fern Shaffer
- Rhonda Roland Shearer
- Cindy Sherman
- Laurie Simmons
- Monica Sjöö
- Sylvia Sleigh
- Jeanette Pasin Sloan
- Barbara T. Smith
- Jean Smith
- Kiki Smith
- Jenny Snider
- Joan Snyder
- Annegret Soltau
- Nancy Spero
- Annie Sprinkle
- M. Louise Stanley
- Jonny Star
- Anita Steckel
- Linda Stein
- Pat Steir
- Beth Stephens
- Meredith Stern
- May Stevens
- Lynne Stopkewich
- SubRosa

== T ==
- TART Artist Collective
- Paula Tavins
- Rini Templeton
- Mariette Teisserenc (born 1940)
- Robin Tewes
- Tlacuilas y Retrateras
- Cosey Fanni Tutti
- Betty Tompkins

== U ==
- Mierle Laderman Ukeles

== W ==
- Merrill Wagner
- The Waitresses
- June Wayne
- Carrie Mae Weems
- Anita Wetzel
- Margaret Wharton
- Susan Dorothea White
- Faith Wilding
- Hannah Wilke
- Martha Wilson
- Nancy Wilson-Pajic
- Jackie Winsor
- Lorena Wolffer
- Kristina Wong
- Saya Woolfalk

== X ==
- Márcia X

== Y ==
- Phyllis Yes
- Nancy Youdelman

== Z ==
- Constantina Zavistanos

== See also ==
- Feminist art movement in the United States
- List of contemporary artists
