= Suzanne Hall (disambiguation) =

Suzanne Hall is an Australian born British actress.

Suzanne Hall may also refer to:

- Suzanne David Hall (1927–2011), spy for the French resistance
- Suzan Hall (fl. 2000–2010), Toronto councillor
- Suzanne Hall (ethnographer), British sociologist

== See also ==
- Susan Hall, British Conservative politician
- Susan Hall (artist) (born 1943), American artist
- Susanna Hall (1583–1649), child of William Shakespeare and Anne Hathaway
- Suzanne Hill (born 1943), Canadian artist
