= Patricia Torres Ortiz =

Mexican artist

Patricia Torres, known as Patricia Torres (born in 1963, Mexico) is a Mexican artist. She uses different forms of visual expression, such as painting, drawing, printmaking, multimedia pieces and video. The themes in her work are related to the female body, its acceptance and the interventions that are made to normalize it, to ensure that it is accepted and valued in society.

Her works present a limited range of colors, and are almost monochromatic. In her paintings, the body appears surrounded by the objects of daily life, medical instruments or organic elements such as grass or hair.

Her pictorial work highlights the biological function of the body, as well as perception through the senses. She incorporates images of human organs, such as the intestine and kidneys, or of different bones, such as the spine and ribs; in some paintings, there exists a dividing line whose function is to create a circular reading, one in which the planes are inside of each other. Her iconographic discourse constitutes a reflection on the private (biological) life and the public life of the female body. Because of the feminist nature of her work, it is included as part of Archiva, an archival project by Mónica Mayer about Mexican artists.

== Education ==
She was simultaneously enrolled in high school and the studio arts program plastic arts directed by the Cultural Diffusion Directorate of the National Autonomous University of Mexico (UNAM). In 1982, she entered the Bachelor of International Relations program at UNAM. At the same time, she studied mural painting, screen printing and drawing at the National School of Studio Arts, at UNAM's Academia de San Carlos (ENAP).

She was Arnold Belkin’s student in an educational program related to photo applications in painting (1988) and one on muralism in (1984–86). From 1983 to 1985, she was his assistant in the completion of three murals. Patricia Torres led a group of students in the painting of the murals made at the Colegio Madrid from 1985 to 86.

She finished a Web Design certificate and a Mono Prints certificate at San Francisco State University, where she would ultimately earn her B.A. in Studio Art in 2008.

== Collaborations with Mexican feminist artists ==
In 1983, after participating in the Arte y Feminismo workshop, taught by Mónica Mayer in the postgraduate course at ENAP, Torres Ortiz collaborated in the formation of one of the first groups of women artists in Mexico called Tlacuilas y Retrateras, which organized La fiesta de quince años, a performance event at ENAP.

At the invitation of Mónica Mayer, Cecilia Sánchez Duarte and Patricia Soriano, in 1993 she participated in the exhibition Las santas del oficio, which was organized by the Pinto mi raya collective, and where works by more than 20 Mexican artists were exhibited.

Patricia Torres is one of the Mexican feminist artists (militant or not) selected by the Archiva project, whose objective is to make the artistic work of women visible. Her artistic record is illustrated with the piece Body, from 2012. The painter herself affirms that in this piece she works the idea of the female body without representing it, thus avoiding the act of converting it into an object.

== Awards ==
- 2014 - Fellowship from the Mexican National System of Creators in Visual Arts, for her project Un solo pelo.
- 2012 - Achievement Award from San Francisco State University, California, USA.
- 1998 - Fellowship from the Kala Art Institute, Berkeley, California, USA.
- 1997 - Honorable mention for her work in the III Bienal de Monterrey at the Museo de Monterrey, Nuevo León, México.
- 1995 - Honorable mention from the XI Bienal de Grabado Latinoamericano y del Caribe, San Juan, Puerto Rico.
- 1993 - Fellowship from the Mexican National Endowment for The Arts in Emerging Artists, México.
- 1988 - Prize from the VIII Bienal de Grabado Latinoamericano y del Caribe, San Juan, Puerto Rico.
- 1987 - National Youth Prize in Visual Arts (Honorable Mention), México, 1987.

== Artist residencies ==
- 2001 - Banff Centre for the Arts, Alberta, Canada.
- 1996 - Banff Centre for the Arts, Alberta, Canada.
- 1995 - National Endowment for the Arts-FONCA / The Fabric Workshop and Museum, Philadelphia, PA, USA.

== Teaching ==
In 2015, she taught the Guest Artist Workshop "Silk screening as a diversifying element in contemporary art," at the National School of Painting, Art and Printmaking "La Esmeralda", at the National Institute of Fine Arts.

== Work ==
Highlighted works include:

=== Painting ===
- Ácido,* oil on canvas, 51 x 41 cm.
- Adentro, *oil on canvas.
- Aire,* oil on canvas, 120 x 120 cm.
- Anónimo, oil on canvas, 1989.
- Antojo.
- Buscando en lo más profundo,* oil on canvas, 120 x 120 cm.
- Busto, oil on canvas, 112 x 112 cm.
- Café.
- Clítoris y hormonas,* oil on canvas, 100 x 120 cm.
- Clítoris, oil on canvas, 107 x 107 cm.
- Completamente de lado (Completely by the side), oil on canvas 109 x 117 cm.
- Comunicación interna (Internal communication), oil on canvas, 107 x 139 cm.
- Corriendo, *oil on canvas.
- Cuerpo (No Body), oil on canvas, 137 x 137 cm, 2012.
- Cuerpos.
- Cuestión de limpiar,* oil on canvas, 100 x 100 cm.
- De cabeza.
- Everybody knows about that,+ oil on canvas.
- Expresiones orgánicas,* oil on canvas, 120 x 120 cm.
- Fluido,+ oil on canvas.
- Fluyendo adentro y afuera,* oil on canvas, 20 x 16 cm.
- Goma de mascar (Gum), oil on canvas, 117 x 117 cm, 2012.
- Hablamos de sólo uno, oil on canvas, 102 x 102 cm.
- Hilo (Thread), oil on canvas, 122 x 122 cm.
- Hueso (Bone/ interconnection), oil on canvas, 102 x 102 cm.
- I feel something,+ oil on canvas.
- Implantes, oil on canvas, 102 x 102 cm, 2012.
- Luz,+ oil on canvas.
- Mujeres bañistas, 1988.
- Órganos (intestino),* oil on canvas, 100 x 100 cm, 2008.
- Orina (Urine), oil on canvas, 117 x 117 cm, 2012.
- Ovulando (Ovulate), oil on canvas, 102 x 107 cm.
- Para llegar, 1991.
- Para ver hoyos negros.
- Pasto II,*oil on canvas, 120 x 120 cm.
- Pelo 2 (Hair 2), oil on canvas, 117 x 122 cm, 2012.
- Pelo largo (Long hair), oil on canvas, 122 x 122 cm, 2012.
- Presencia (Presence), oil on canvas, 117 x 117 cm, 2012.
- Quemando, moviendo y excretando,* oil on canvas, 120 x 120 cm.
- Recuento,* oil on canvas, 100 x 120 cm.
- Respirando (Breathing), oil on canvas, 112 x 122 cm, 2012.
- Saliendo y entrando.
- Saliva, oil on canvas, 112 x 112 cm, 2012.
- Saltando (Jumping), oil on canvas, 122 x 117 cm, 2012.
- Seedling, oil on canvas, 122 x 122 cm.
- Sentimientos.*
- Sueño en la playa, 1988.
- Sumergir.
- Volando, 1996.
- Voz (Voice), oil on canvas, 107 x 107 cm.

=== Drawing ===
- Buildings, ink on paper, 74 x 56 cm.
- Contradictions, ink on paper, 74 x 56 cm.
- Key, ink on paper.
- Looking, ink on paper, 74 x 56 cm.
- Milk, ink on paper, 74 x 56 cm.
- Rapidity, ink on paper, 56 x 76 cm, 1997.
- Since then (Mirada), ink on paper, 74 x 56 cm, 2008.
- Structure, ink on paper, 76 x 56 cm.
- Vision, ink on paper, 74 x 56 cm.

=== Printmaking ===
- Ahora,* dry point, 75 x 55 cm, 2002.
- Conos,* dry point, 75 x 55 cm, 2002.
- Espalda,* dry point, 55 x 55 cm, 2002.
- Pasto,* dry point, 75 x 55 cm, 2002.
- Repitiendo,* linoleum, 75 x 55 cm, 2002.
- Sentidos,* dry point, 75 x 55 cm, 2002.
- Un pelo,* dry point, 75 x 55 cm, 2002.

=== Serigraphy ===
- Mirando,* screen print, 55 x 75 cm, 2001.
- Venus, screen print, 1988 (won the prize from the VIII Bienal de Grabado Latinoamericano y del Caribe, San Juan, Puerto Rico).

== Exhibitions ==
=== Solo exhibitions ===
- Un solo pelo, Galería Lourdes Sosa, Polanco, Mexico City, Mexico, 2014.
- We are talking about only one, Polanco Gallery, San Francisco, California, USA, 2005.
- Impressions, The Other Gallery, Banff Centre for the Arts, Alberta, Canada, 2001.
- Imágenes, Galería Arthaus, Polanco, Mexico City, Mexico, 1999.
- Icons, Kala Art Institute, Fellowship Awards Exhibition, Berkeley, California, USA, 1997.
- Letters from the heart, Robert Dana Gallery, San Francisco, California, USA, 1990.

=== Group exhibitions ===
- Mujeres en el arte, Galería Universitaria Fernando Cano, Toluca, Mexico City, 2015.
- Hearts, Galería Lourdes Sosa, Polanco, Mexico City, Mexico, 2009.
- Arte contemporáneo de Latinoamérica, Museum of Latin American Art (MOLAA), Los Ángeles, California, USA, 2007.
- · Artists of the Lourdes Sosa Gallery, Special Art Gallery, Miami, Florida, USA, 2004.
- Movimiento de Arte y Cultura Latino Americana (MACLA), Centro Cultural de Arte Latinoamericano, Annual Exhibition, San Jose, California, USA, 2001.
- XII Bienal de Grabado Latinoamericano y del Caribe, San Juan, Puerto Rico, 1998.
- VIII International Biennial Printing & Drawing Exhibit, Taipei, Taiwan, 1997.
- X Bienal de Grabado Latinoamericano y del Caribe, San Juan de Puerto Rico, 1995.
- IV Bienal Internacional de Pintura, Cuenca, Ecuador, 1994.
- Patricia Torres, Pintura, Galería Alan Blondel, Paris, France, 1993.
- Gráfica y magia de México, Houston, Texas, USA, 1991.
- Gráfica mexicana, itinerant exhibit in Latin America, National Autonomous University of Mexico (UNAM), Mexico City, Mexico, 1989.
- Feria Internacional de Gráfica, Foire Internationale d’Art Contemporain-Saga, Grand Palais, Paris, France, 1988.
- I Biennale Internationale de l’Estampe, Palais de Rois, Perpiñán, France, 1988.
- Ritos, Evento plástico, Escuela Nacional de Artes Plásticas, Academia de San Carlos, Mexico City, Mexico, 1984.
