= Bio-Arte =

Mexican feminist art collective

Bio-Arte is a feminist art collective, made up of the artists Nunik Sauret, Laita, Roselle Faure, Rose Van Lengen and Guadalupe García. It was founded in September 1983, with its first exhibition taking place at the Museo Nacional de Arte during the colloquium "Bordando sobre la escritura y la cocina" (Embroidering on writing and cooking).

== Context of Emergence ==
Bio-Arte, among other contemporary Mexican art collectives, developed in the 1970s continuing into the 1980s, within a social and artistic period known as "Los grupos" or "Generación de los Grupos,” proclaiming itself the antithesis of the Ruptura movement from the 1950s. After 1968, some younger artists and their artistic production were characterized by a demonstration of opposition to the governmental regime and the artistic system, in an effort to make art public and liberal.

In 1977, Helen Escobedo selected various groups to represent Mexico at the X Bienal de jóvenes (X Youth Biennial) in Paris. Upon her return, the works were exhibited at the El Museo Universitario de Ciencias y Artes (UNAM), where they captured the attention of the public and other artists, who began to form groups as a form of artistic experimentation, a questioning of conventional models and a manner of forming direct relationship with the public.

== Bio-Arte ==
The groups formed in this context were interested in political issues, social issues or the artistic system. Among them, Bio-Arte emerged with two other feminist collectives emerged, although with a very brief artistic activity.

Bio-Arte was focused on political art and social changes, and they sought to address these issues from the creation of new visual languages as their artistic proposal. One of their principal themes in their action at the MUNAL was the biological metamorphoses of women.

In addition to their action at MUNAL, they carried out two more artistic actions. One in the Museum of Fine Arts of Toluca during the exhibition "Mujeres artistas-artistas mujeres" (Women artists-artists women), and in their piece "Nacida entre mujeres" (Born among women), which took place during the project "La fiesta de XV años," a collaborative event with the other feminist groups (Polvo de Gallina negra and Tlacuilas y Retrateras).
