= Hans Peter Brondmo =

American computer scientist

Hans Peter Brøndmo
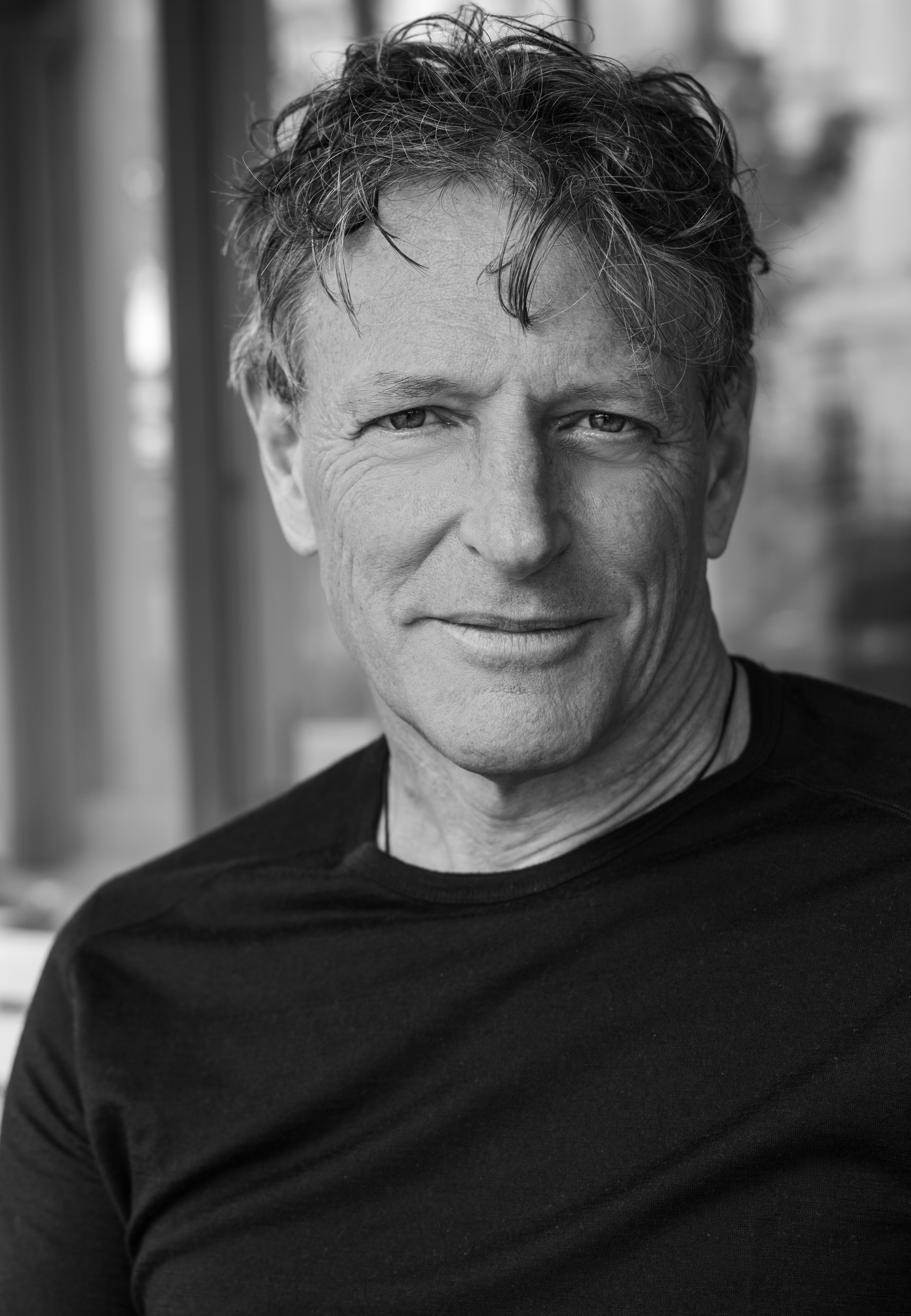
- Hans Peter Brøndmo in 2022
- Born: June 22, 1962 (age 64); Waterville, Maine
- Education: M.I.T
- Occupation: Computer Scientist
- Employer(s): X, formerly Google[x]
- Known for: technology entrepreneurship, robotics, photography

Hans Peter Brøndmo (born 22 June 1962) is an American-Norwegian computer scientist and technology entrepreneur. In 2016 he became vice president at X (formerly Google[x]) and general manager of the Everyday Robots project. He previously worked at Apple Computer on Hypercard development, founded startups in online marketing and social media and held executive positions at Nokia Corporation and Google.

== Early life and education ==
Brøndmo was born in Waterville, Maine, but moved before the age of one to Norway where he grew up outside of the town of Hønefoss, northwest of Oslo. He was educated in public schools and served a year in the Norwegian military before returning to the United States to study computer science at the Massachusetts Institute of Technology. While at MIT he interned as a research associate at CERN and enrolled in the Masters program in the MIT Media Lab and the MIT Technology and Policy Program. Brøndmo was part of MIT's Interactive Cinema research group, an early effort in interactive video story telling led by Glorianna Davenport. He is credited with inventing a type of animated computer graphics icon known as a Micon, or “motion icon” described in the 1990 BBC documentary “Hyperland” written by Douglas Adams.

== Career ==
After completing his undergraduate degree, in 1987 Brondmo co-founded Snappy Software, an expert systems software company with seed funding from Apple Computer. The following year he joined Apple Computer and worked on the company's Hypercard program from Japan. In 1990 he co-founded DIVA, or Digital Video Applications Corp., based in Cambridge, MA, where he served as the company's engineering director. Diva, which was the first commercial spin-off from Media Lab, developed a Macintosh-based video editing program known as VideoShop and was acquired by Avid Technology in 1993. Brondmo became an entrepreur-in-residence at Mohr Davidow Ventures. In 1997 he founded Post Communications which offered customized email marketing services, distinguished by giving the recipient control over the flow of marketing information. Post Communications was later sold to online marketing company, Netcentives. In 2002, he published "The Engaged Customer: The New Rules of Internet Direct Marketing". Brondmo went on to start Plum Ventures in 2005, a social networking service intended for small groups of friends and family. In the fall of 2009 Plum was acquired by the mapping division of Nokia. At Nokia he led a project team to reinvent the camera in the age of smartphones. The product was not commercialized after Nokia sold its mobile phone business to Microsoft. In 2013, he co-taught a class on computational photography at the MIT Media Lab. In 2016 Brondmo was hired by Google X to help the company reorganize its efforts in robotics. He now leads the Everyday Robot project at X (formerly Google X).

== Bibliography ==
- Brondmo, Hans Peter. The Engaged Customer: The New Rules of Internet Direct Marketing. United Kingdom: Piatkus, 2002.

== Congressional testimony ==
- Congressional testimony on internet privacy
- Congressional testimony on email spam

== Patents ==
- US 5101364, Davenport, Glorianna, "Method and facility for dynamic video composition and viewing", published 1992-03-32
- US 2013066840, Silva, Eric A. & Barss-Bailey, J., "Method and apparatus for resolving incoherent data items", published 2013-03-14
- US 20120094721, Brondmo, Hans Peter; Wang, M. & Lapierre, J., "Method and apparatus for sharing of data by dynamic groups", published 2012-04-19
- US 8868105, Kalofonos, Dimitris; Antoniou, Zoe & Peterson, Mark et al., "Method and apparatus for generating location stamps", published 2012-10-21
