= Sauret =

Sauret is a surname. Notable people with the surname include:

- Audrey Sauret (born 1976), French basketball player
- Émile Sauret (1852–1920), French violinist and composer
- Henriette Sauret (1890–1976), French feminist, author, pacifist, journalist
- Nunik Sauret (born 1951), Mexican printmaker
- Pierre François Sauret (1742–1818), French Army officer

== Other ==
- Sauret-Besserve, commune in the Puy-de-Dôme department in Auvergne-Rhône-Alpes in central France
