= Shirley Pettibone =

American artist (1936–2011)

- Born: 1936; Bakersfield, California
- Died: February 23, 2011 (aged 74–75); Los Angeles, California
- Website: shirleypettibone.com

Shirley Pettibone (1936 – 2011) was an American painter known for painting, and cloth sculpture.

Pettibone was born in Bakersfield, California in 1936. She attended Principia College and the Otis Art Institute. She was married to fellow artist Richard Pettibone. The marriage ended in divorce. She died on February 23, 2011 in Los Angeles.

Pettibone's work was included in the 1971 exhibition Twenty Six Contemporary Women Artists held at The Aldrich Contemporary Art Museum and the 2022 exhibition 52 Artists: A Feminist Milestone also at the Aldrich.

Her work is in the collection of the Aldrich Contemporary Art Museum and the Delaware Art Museum,
