= Women's Studio Workshop =

- Abbreviation: WSW
- Formation: 1974; 52 years ago
- Founder: Ann Kalmbach; Tatana Kellner; Anita Wetzel; Barbara Leoff Burge
- Headquarters: Rosendale, New York, U.S.
- Website: wsworkshop.org

Women's Studio Workshop (WSW) is a nonprofit visual arts studio and private press offering residencies and educational workshops, located in Rosendale, New York, United States.

The workshop was founded in 1974 by Ann Kalmbach, Tatana Kellner, Anita Wetzel, and Barbara Leoff Burge as an alternative space for female artists to create new work, gain artistic experience, and develop new skills. The studio operates throughout the year with artist residencies, gallery exhibitions, artist lectures, and diverse educational programs for children and adults. In addition, they operate a Summer Art Institute which includes options to study abroad. The studio supports projects in a wide range of media types, with a focus on book art, papermaking, and printmaking methods: screen printing, letterpress, etching, intaglio.

The workshop is represented in book arts and special collections of notable libraries, such as the Library of Congress, the National Museum of Women in the Arts, the Dexter Library, Maryland Institute College of Art, and James Branch Cabell Library, Virginia Commonwealth University. Editions by visiting artists published by the Women's Studio Workshop have been featured in overview exhibitions and symposiums on contemporary book arts such as the Codex Book Fair and Symposium, and the Pyramid Atlantic Book Arts Fair.

In 2025 the traveling exhibition A Radical Alteration: Women’s Studio Workshop as a Sustainable Model for Art Making presented examples of Artist’s Book Grant publications from WSW. The tour includes the Bainbridge Island Museum of Art and the National Museum of Women in the Arts.

== The Artists' Book Collection ==
The artists' books produced at the studio cover a range of topics from the political to the personal. The books come in a variety of forms, ranging from interactive puzzles that must be assembled to accordion folded books to books made with a variety of mixed media.
