= Twenty Six Contemporary Women Artists =

Art exhibition in New York (1971)

Twenty Six Contemporary Women Artists was an art exhibition held at The Aldrich Contemporary Art Museum from April 18 - June 13, 1971. It was the first show curated by Lucy R. Lippard. Lippard only included artists who had never had a solo exhibition. It featured 26 emerging New York based women artists.

In the preface to the catalog for the show Lippard stated:

The woman artist has tended to be seen either as another artist's wife, or girl, or as a dilettante. Now I know that, contrary to popular opinion, women are not any more "part-time artists" than anyone else.

== Artists ==
The 26 artist in the show were

- Cecile Abish
- Alice Aycock
- Cynthia Carlson
- Sue Ann Childress
- Glorianna Davenport
- Susan Hall
- Mary Heilmann
- Audrey Hemenway
- Laurace James
- Mablen Jones
- Carol Kinne
- Christine Kozlov
- Sylvia Mangold
- Brenda Miller
- Mary Miss
- Dona Nelson
- Louise Parks
- Shirley Pettibone
- Howardena Pindell
- Adrian Piper
- Reeva Potoff
- Paula Tavins
- Merrill Wagner
- Grace Bakst Wapner
- Jacqueline Winsor
- Barbara Zucker
