= Carol Kinne =

American artist and art teacher (1942–2016)

- Born: December 14, 1942; Utica, New York, US
- Died: March 18, 2016 (aged 73)
- Known for: Painting; teaching
- Movement: Modernism
- Spouse: Robert Huot

Carol Kinne (1942–2016) was an American artist and art teacher.

== Early life and education ==
Kinne was born in Utica, New York on December 14, 1942, to Thomas Kinne and Rosemary Allen Kinne. She attended schools in New Hartford, Newtonville, Mount Vernon, and Bronxville, all in New York State, graduating from Bronxville Senior School in June 1960. She then attended Syracuse University, the University of Buffalo, and Hunter College in New York City, then receiving a scholarship to attend Bennington College in Vermont. She obtained a Bachelor of Fine Arts degree in painting from Hunter in 1965, while at the same time working at the New York Public Library to fund her studies. She then returned to Bennington, from where she received a Master of Arts (MA) in painting and sculpture, studying with Paul Feeley among others.

== Career ==
After finalising her MA, she returned to New York City and began to teach at Hunter College. When the city almost went bankrupt in 1975, she lost her teaching job, eventually finding work with the Gallery Association of New York State in Hamilton, New York making crates for traveling exhibitions. In 1980 she got a teaching job at Colgate University in Hamilton. There she became interested in computer-generated art and created a digital studio class. She also taught at Rutgers University.

Kinne participated in many exhibitions in the US and in Paris, France. These included the one-woman show, Atomic Baby, at Colgate University, the title reflecting the fact that she was born a few days after the first uranium-fuelled nuclear reaction was achieved in the US. She was one of the exhibitors in the Twenty Six Contemporary Women Artists exhibition at The Aldrich Contemporary Art Museum in Connecticut, curated by Lucy R. Lippard in 1971. Her work, which often involved the use of grids, has been criticized as being formulaic. Married to the photographer and artist, Robert Huot, she frequently exhibited with him in Paris between 2004 and 2012.

In addition to her art and teaching she participated closely with the New York State Council on the Arts and the New York Foundation for the Arts. She was also a board member of Sculpture Space in Utica for twelve years.

== Death and legacy ==
Kinne died on March 18, 2016, in Columbus, New York.

In 2016 her husband bought a wooden building in Columbus that had previously been a Presbyterian and Congregational church and, later, the town hall. He restored the building and renamed it as “The Carol Kinne Memorial Columbus Center”. Opened in August 2018, it now displays her art.

One of her last collaborations with her husband was to reinterpret some classic works of art by replacing the young people in the originals with the artists' own aging bodies, an example being Sandro Botticelli's The Birth of Venus. The exhibition was held at the Arnaud Lefebvre gallery in Paris in 2021. In 2022 her work was included in the exhibition 52 Artists: A Feminist Milestone at the Aldrich Museum. This showed work by all but three of the 26 artists represented at the Twenty Six Contemporary Women Artists exhibition in 1971, together with 26 artists born after 1980.
