= Pinto Mi Raya =

Conceptual art project

Pinto Mi Raya is a conceptual art project by Monica Mayer and Victor Lerma.

== History ==
In 1989, Lerma and Mayer created the ongoing conceptual art project, Pinto Mi Raya, whose main function is as an archive that specializes in collecting and cataloging newspaper articles on contemporary art in Mexico. The project's objective is to stimulate the art system in Mexico through various activities, workshops, and performance interventions involving other practitioners such as El Balcón del CENIDIAP, De Crítico, artista y loco..., and El Mejor Amigo de Los Museos. Pinto mi Raya has also hosted radio programs such as “Pinto mi Raya: Donde las Artes Visuales Suenan” (ABCradio, 1999–2000) and has actively participated in various activist actions as part of the artistic community.

The original home of Pinto Mi Raya, including its mini-gallery, was Somberete #55 in the Colonia Condesa neighborhood of Mexico City.

In the 1998, publication 'Pinto mi Raya—A Brief Story of Almost 10 Years of Applied Conceptual Art Projects', Lerma and Mayer write: "This experience allowed us to detect some of the most serious problems in our art system, and little by little we started turning into a platform from which we could launch applied conceptual art projects to try to find solutions for them. In other words, we seek to lubricate the art system so it runs more smoothly. We also decided to become nomads."

== Publications ==
- Mayer, Mónica, Víctor Lerma, and Alfredo Ramírez. Arte público en el archivo de Pinto Mi Raya. México: Pinto Mi Raya, 2002.
- Mayer, Mónica, Víctor Lerma, Alethia Edurné González Cañetas, and Alejandra Sánchez Avilés. Mujeres artistas en el Archivo de Pinto Mi Raya, colectivas y textos varios. México: Pinto Mi Raya, 2003.
- Mayer, Mónica, Víctor Lerma, Alethia Edurné González Cañetas, and Alejandra Sánchez Avilés. Ojos y vidrio: las fotógrafas en el archivo de Pinto Mi Raya. México: Pinto Mi Raya, 2003.
- Mayer, Mónica, Víctor Lerma, and Miriam Urbano Alonso. Performance en el archivo de Pinto Mi Raya: versión actualizada de Mayo de 1991 a Mayo de 2005). [México]: Pinto Mi Raya, 2005.
