= Laurace James =

American artist

Laurace James (born 1937) is an American artist. She was a founding member of A.I.R. Gallery.

James’s work was included in the 1971 exhibition Twenty Six Contemporary Women Artists at the exhibition held at The Aldrich Contemporary Art Museum and the 2022 exhibition 52 Artists: A Feminist Milestone also at the Aldrich. Her work is in the collection of the Smithsonian American Art Museum and the Whitney Museum of American Art.
