= Richard Pettibone =

American painter (1938–2024)

- Born: January 5, 1938; Alhambra, California, U.S.
- Died: August 19, 2024 (aged 86); Cobleskill, New York, U.S.
- Education: Otis Art Institute
- Known for: Painting, sculpture

Richard Pettibone (January 5, 1938 – August 19, 2024) was an American artist. He was known for his appropriation art, a practice that involves replicating or reinterpreting existing artworks. He is best known for his meticulously crafted miniature copies of works by artists such as Andy Warhol, Roy Lichtenstein, Frank Stella, and Marcel Duchamp, which challenged conventional ideas of originality and authorship in modern art.

== Biography ==
Pettibone was born in Alhambra, California on January 5, 1938. He studied painting and design at the Otis Art Institute in Los Angeles, where he received his MFA in 1962.

His early exposure to the emerging Pop art movement, particularly Andy Warhol's 1962 exhibition of Campbell's Soup Cans at the Ferus Gallery in Los Angeles, had a lasting influence on his artistic direction. Pettibone recalled in Art in America: "Many, many of the other artists who saw it really hated it. They were pounding the tables with anger, screaming, 'this is not art!' I told them, this may be the worst art you've ever seen, but it’s art. It's not sports!" The experience was formative, inspiring Pettibone to produce his own Campbell's Soup Cans, which closely emulated Warhol's originals, even including Warhol's name rubber-stamped on the works alongside his own. In 1963, he saw Marcel Duchamp's retrospective at the Pasadena Art Museum, which also inspired him.

Pettibone had his first major exhibition at the Ferus Gallery in 1965, provoking strong reactions from critics and fellow artists. He also copied paintings by Frank Stella and Roy Lichtenstein, and sculptures such as Warhol's Brillo Boxes and Duchamp's readymades.

In addition to Pop art appropriations, Pettibone explored other subjects and styles. In the 1970s, he created Photorealist paintings, and in the 1990s, he produced series of book covers by the poet Ezra Pound, copying them with careful fidelity.

Although Pettibone was not as widely known as some contemporaries in the Pictures Generation, such as Sherrie Levine and Louise Lawler, he achieved institutional recognition. His work was the focus of a 2005 retrospective that originated at the Institute of Contemporary Art, Philadelphia, and was organized in collaboration with the Tang Museum and Art Gallery at Skidmore College and California's Laguna Art Museum.

Several of his miniature reproductions are in the Detroit Institute of Arts, the Museum of Fine Arts Boston, the Museum of Modern Art, the National Gallery of Art, and the Whitney Museum of American Art.

Near the end of his life, Pettibone lost vision in his right eye and could no longer create his miniature paintings. His final works were three 5 × 7-inch canvases featuring rubber-stamped dialogue in red and black ink from the film Barbie (2023).

His first marriage to fellow artist Shirley Pettibone ended in divorce.

Pettibone died on August 19, 2024, in Cobleskill, New York, at the age of 86. He was survived by his wife Nancy Pettibone (née Becker), who was a toy designer; his daughter from his first marriage, Claire Pettibone, a fashion designer; a stepson, and two granddaughters.
