= Grace Bakst Wapner =

American artist (1934–2025)

- Born: February 23, 1934; Brooklyn, New York, USA
- Died: June 23, 2025 (aged 91); Woodstock, New York
- Known for: Sculpture; ceramics; textile-based installations
- Spouse: Jerry Wapner

Grace Bakst Wapner (1934–2025) was an American sculptor, installation artist and ceramist.

== Early life and education ==
Bakst Wapner was born on February 23, 1934, in Brooklyn, New York, the daughter of Max and Fannie Bakst. She attended Midwood High School in Brooklyn, and Bennington College in Vermont, majoring in social science with the intention of pursuing a career in psychology, while taking a summer Master of Fine Arts course at Bard College in New York State.

== Career ==
Bakst Wapner initially started by doing clay sculpture, sharing a studio with the sculptor, Eva Hesse. From the late 1960s, she was using Styrofoam as a raw material, sculpting and painting it to resemble rocks. From the late 1970s she concentrated on installations made from satin and velvet, which were in bold colors and pioneered the use of fabric in art. These installations were influenced by the work of American anthropologist Edward T. Hall. She received a National Endowment for the Arts Fellowship in Sculpture Award in 1978–1979. She turned to ceramics in the late 1980s, adapting classical vases and urns to her style. She also painted ceramic works of flowers and rocks that were inspired by ancient Chinese and Japanese gardens. Continuing to experiment, in the 2000s she worked with painted textile wall pieces, following the minimalist ideas of her early work and incorporating the fabric-handling methods of her large installations. Bakst Wapner received an American Academy of Arts and Letters Purchase Program award in 2013 for her work The Western Wall to be purchased for a museum. She received an Outstanding Achievement in the Arts Award from the Woodstock Byrdcliffe Guild (WBG) in 2015. Towards the end of her life, her art combined both fabrics and ceramics and she also did painting. Throughout her career she taught and lectured at colleges, universities and art schools.

== Exhibitions ==
In 1971 her work was exhibited at the Twenty Six Contemporary Women Artists exhibition at The Aldrich Contemporary Art Museum in Ridgefield, Connecticut. This was an exhibition design to show women who had not previously had a solo exhibition. After that, her early work was often shown at the Mercer Gallery in New York. She had seven solo exhibitions there between 1973 and 1984. In 1987, 1989 and 1992 she exhibited at the Bernice Steinbaum Gallery in New York, a gallery that aimed to have women make up half of its roster of artists, and also in 1994 and 1998 when the gallery was known as the Steinbaum Krauss Gallery. After Steinbaum moved to Florida, Bakst Wapner had an exhibition at her Miami gallery in 2002. In total, she had around 30 solo exhibitions.

Her work is held by the Samuel Dorsky Museum in New Paltz, New York, by the Blanton Museum of Art in Austin, Texas, by the Sol LeWitt Collection, by the Racine Art Museum in Racine, Wisconsin, by the Hebrew Union College, by the Charleston Museum in Charleston, South Carolina, by the St. Paul Insurance Company and by Prestige Fine Art.

== Death ==
Bakst Wapner died on June 23, 2025, at her home in Woodstock, New York. Her husband, Jerry Wapner, predeceased her. They had two children.
