= Cecile Abish =

American artist and photographer

- Born: 1930 (age 94–95); New York City, US
- Education: Brooklyn College
- Known for: Sculpture, photography

Cecile Abish (born 1930) is an American artist known primarily for her works in sculpture and photography. Abish was an urban planner until 1965, when she devoted herself full-time to art. Her works have been shown in the Newark College of Engineering, the Institute of Contemporary Art in Boston, and the Architektur Zentrum in Vienna. Her late husband, the writer Walter Abish, wrote The Shape of Absence in 1990, based on her work.

== Sculpture ==
For many years, Abish's primary focus was sculpture installations. She frequently combined manufactured materials, such as particle board, and multitudes of marbles. Her work How 4 into 4 into 3 (1975) consists of homasote, marbles, and baking soda. This homosote is placed upright alongside the interior walls of a room, while the floor is covered with marbles. The marbles are separated next to the homosote, creating a shadow-like effect as if the marbles were light. This is reflected by the title of the work; in one corner, four particle boards create four shadows, in the opposite corner only three shadows are visible from the four particle boards.

Abish, Carl Andre, Beverly Pepper, and Tony Smith created a "Statement of Sculptors" that was published in the December 1975 issue of Art Journal. Abish's section was entitled "Duration of the Sculpture in Possession of a Surface." She argued that the surfaces upon which she works do not belong to her. She temporarily takes possession of the surface. In her view, sculpture has a significant impact on the world around it: "The thousands of marbles [referring to her work How 4 into 4 into 3] add a hard but penetrable surface to the surface…this new surface is an omnidirectional translucent flowing surface." Abish further explains the harmony that a surface has with a completed sculpture after the two are one: "Everywhere surfaces await the coming of sculpture. The coming of a new vision, as floors will drop away and the boundary lines will be drawn."

This idea is explored further in Near Where I live (1976), where several boards are laid on the ground, with thousands of marbles on the bare space between the boards. The boards have incisions on them in such a way that creates a channel across each board; gaps in the marbles continue the route. The result, says reviewer Barbera Cavaliere, "suggests a continuum within the structure… a sweeping arabesque motion only partially present in the incised arcs, enhancing the lyrical flow felt also in the scattered shiny marbles." In 1974, Lawrence Alloway wrote, "The work of Cecile Abish has been harder to see than it should have been. The distribution problem has arisen not only because she has no gallery, but because her works are usually erected on the spot." He concludes that the work of Abish demands to be seen and documented.

== Photography ==
Abish participated in "Deconstruction/Reconstruction: The Transformation of Photographic Information Into Metaphor", an art exhibition focused on photomanipulation. The exhibition featured artists by manipulating different photographs and reconstructing them into one. Specifically for Abish, multiple photographs were taken and were essentially cut into jigsaw puzzle pieces, which were then rearranged and reassembled to create new works, such as Firsthand. Abish also took photographs of museum interiors, which were used in Walter Abish's writing work What Else? to accompany the museological tone of the book. Many of Abish's photographs are silver gelatin prints.

== Work ==
Abish has exhibited in New York at the Alessandra Gallery, the Bykert Gallery, and the Michael Walls Gallery. She has also shown in Ohio, Massachusetts, and Michigan, as well as Germany, Austria, and France. She has been associated as a visual artist with the University of Massachusetts, Amherst College, Cooper Union, and Harvard University. She earned a BFA at Brooklyn College in 1953.

Abish’s work was included in the 1971 exhibition Twenty Six Contemporary Women Artists held at The Aldrich Contemporary Art Museum She was also included in the 2016 group exhibition FORTY at MoMA PS1.

Abish contributed the graphic art for volume 15 (April 1984) of Fiction International, the first issue published by San Diego University Press.
