= Ana Victoria Jiménez =

Mexican artist (1941–2025)

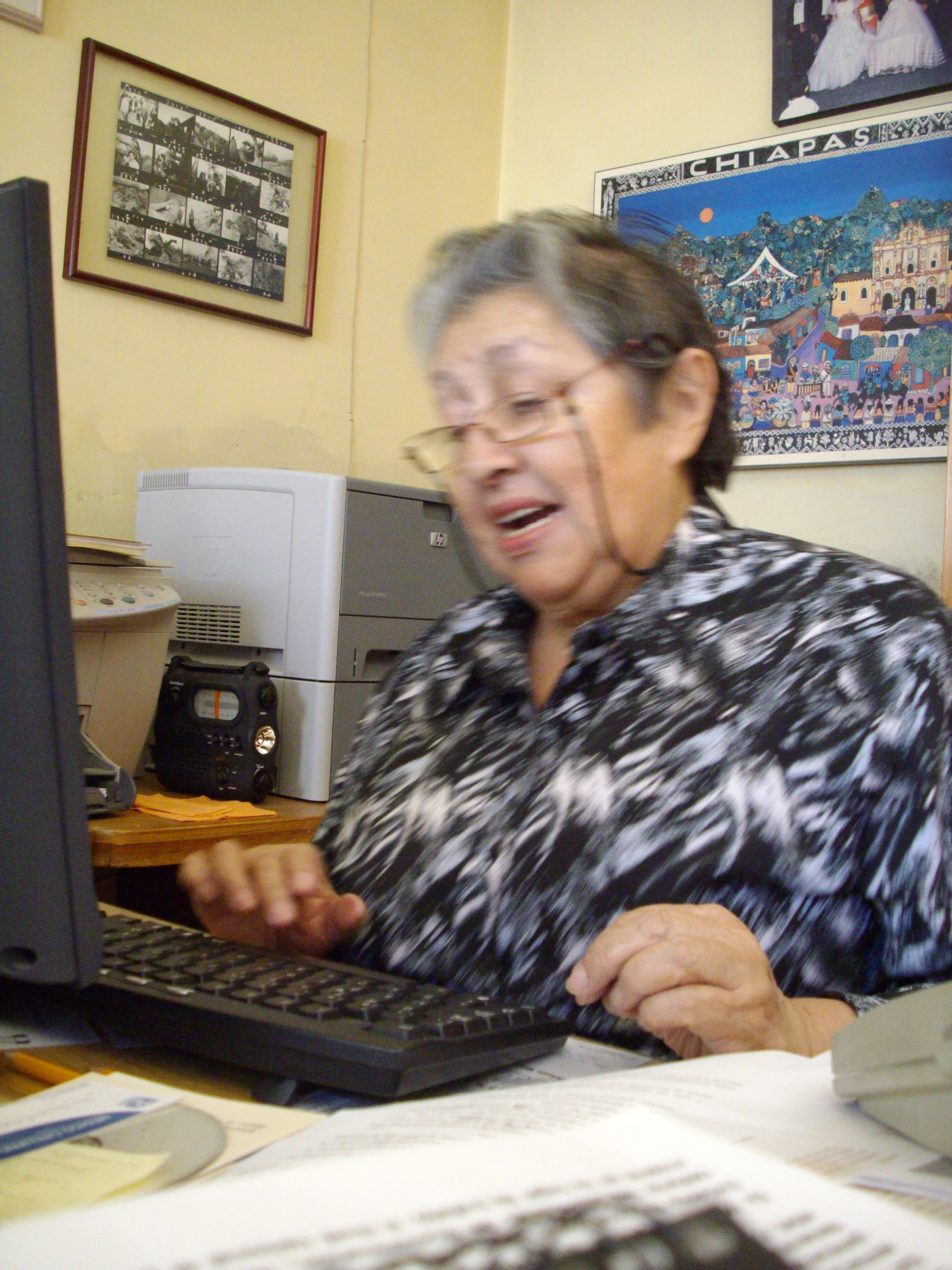
- Born: August 31, 1941; Mexico City, Mexico
- Died: November 23, 2025 (aged 84); Mexico City, Mexico
- Occupations: Photographer; Visual artist Feminist activist Archivist

Ana Victoria Jiménez (August 31, 1941 – November 23, 2025) was a Mexican photographer, editor and feminist activist, who actively participated in the second wave of Mexico's feminist movement. She was best known for her archive, Archivo Ana Victoria Jiménez, which contains photographs, posters, and flyers that demonstrated or related to women activism in Mexico.

== Background ==
Ana Victoria Jiménez was born in Mexico City on August 31, 1941. Her parents were Ana Álvarez and Ramiro Jiménez. She began her activism at the young age of seventeen. In her house, during the 1950s and 1960s, she and her family read many journals by Política and other newspapers, that informed on the political climate; she also had many friends that she would attend political conferences with. As most famously known for her photographs and archive, Jiménez's educational training did not involve photography. After finishing her studies at Sindicato de Pintores y Escultores, she worked as a typesetter in a print shop. Her job was to check for any spelling errors found in linotype presses. Years later, she worked for IBM where she spent much of her time utilizing a portable machine. Jiménez's activism and militancy was first enacted through the Mexican Communist Party and later on, in Mexico's feminist movement. It wasn't until her involvement with the women's movement, that Jiménez began her work as a photographer and archivist. After participating and documenting in the movement for many years, Jiménez decided to begin her work as an independent editor, co-author, and desktop publisher. She focused her writing on the history of the Unión Nacional de Mujeres Mexicanas (UNMM), its members, and artists. She also wrote through many Mexican journals, newspapers, and books, concentrating on themes such as: domestic work, women biographies, and campesinas (women peasants). In 2011, her documentations of the women's movement gained recognition and was exhibited as an archive at, the Universidad Iberoamericana. Thereafter, Ana Victoria Jiménez formed part of important exhibitions in the United States and continued her work as an editor and author in Mexico.

She did not attain a high school diploma. However, she did attend, Sindicato de Pintores y Escultores, in Mexico, where she studied graphic arts. It was not until later of her photography career that she took an instructional class with well known photographer, Alicia D'Amico. In 1974-75, Jiménez decided to continue her photography education by enrolling in classes that would train her on technique.

Jiménez died in Mexico City on November 23, 2025, at the age of 84.

== Activism ==
=== Communism ===
Jiménez was dedicated to activism from the 1960s onwards. In the beginning of her activist career, she formed part of the Communist Party. Within the Communist Party, specifically the Communist Youth League, she was able to become the secretary of the party's Comité Central (The central Committee). Also, during her participation in a communist party named Central Campesina Independiente and Frente Electoral del Pueblo (Central Peasant Independent and Electoral Front of the People), Jiménez was arrested and detained during an operation by Mexico City police, which was organized with the intent of stopping radical activity by communists. Furthermore, due to her position as the secretary of the Comité Central, Jiménez was able to travel to the Soviet Union, and other communist countries.

=== Feminist movement ===
Jiménez's active participation in Mexico's feminist movements, specifically during the post-revolution and second wave, allowed the activist to support feminist issues such as the legalization of abortion, equality, and recognition. Still considered a communist activist, Jiménez moved on to become member and founder of, Unión Nacional de Mujeres Mexicanas (UNMM). During her time with the UNMM, she became the group's representative at the International Democratic Federation of Women (FDIM), which was stationed in Berlin. With the FDIM, Jiménez and others constantly worked on bulletins for the group. Then, in the late 1970s, she decided to form part of Mujeres en Acción Solidaria (Women in Solidarity Action). After becoming part of Mujeres en Acción Solidaria (MAS), Jiménez's activism began to shift focus onto feminism. Gabriela Aceves Sepulveda tells us that through Mujeres en Acción Solidaria, specifically after the march towards Mexico's Mother's Monument (May 9, 1971), a march which demanded a change in the manipulation of Mother's Day and women objectification of the media, Jiménez actively began documenting demonstrations. Another group that Jiménez decided to join, in 1972, was Movimiento Nacional de Mujeres (MNM). MNM was established by Esperanza Brito de Martí and other women, whom worked in broadcasting and print media industries such as Martha de la Lama.

Furthering her involvement with the feminist world, Jiménez engaged in many feminist art collectives. Being part of feminist art collectives, according to Cecilia Fajardo-Hill, allowed Jiménez to question the discrimination in art that women faced. Her questioning, led her to produce work that mirrored personal experiences of women in the movement and creating exhibitions, which implemented the idea that one should challenge the patriarcal culture found in art. One of the feminist art organizations she became involved with was, Tlacuilas y Retrateras, founded by artist and feminist activist Mónica Mayer, which was one of the first feminist art collectives in its country and gained notoriety with its controversial work La fiesta de XV años.

== Works ==
=== Photography ===
Much of her recognized photography is those photographed during Mexican Feminist Movement. Many of Jiménez's images portray activist during protest and events such as the March for Decriminalizing Abortion (1977), in front of Mexico's Angel of independence, and the protest in the National Auditorium against the ideas posed by the Miss Universe contest of Mexico. During the time that Ana Victoria Jiménez was dedicated to photography, she sold some of her work and was even asked to create images for store catalogues. Her photos of feminist demonstrations were many times featured in the newspapers and magazines, but were not given credit. Jiménez claims that she decided to leave photography when she realized that it was not her line of work, unlike her work as an editor. She did however, continue capturing photos until the 1990s.

Jiménez began to create still photography in 1978, when she began to work with Cine Mujer, a collective which was founded by Rosa Martha Fernandez and Beatriz Mar. Cine Mujer was founded in 1975 with the purpose to create films that highlighted women's issues. Within Cine Mujer, Jiménez captured images for many films such as, Cosas de Mujeres 1975-1978 (Women's Matters). Cosas de Mujeres's objection was to reveal the abortion restrictions that women faced. The still images, which Jiménez created for the film, were presented in many campaigns that tried to decriminalize abortion. Another film that Jiménez created with Cine Mujer was, Rompiendo Silencio (Breaking the Silence), which was released in 1979 and centered on raped women. Both films, were captured in black and white, shot with 16mm, featured interviews, fictional narrative, still photography, and statistics. Gabriela Aceves claims that, Jiménez's still photography, showing demonstrations by feminist, contributed to placing Mexico's feminist movement in a state of credibility, and a place where they fought for global women issues.

Jiménez's first photographic essay was, Jiménez: 1985. This photographic essay, narrates a story in which a woman climbs up to a tree to speak of her youth, while also portraying wishes of getting married and fulfilling her dreams. The woman of this narrative, is eventually beaten by her husband and her children are taken away from her, resulting in her becoming crazy. According to Andrea Giunta, Jiménez's purpose of this photographic essay was to shed light on the influence that religion had on women in Mexico.

Other photographic essays that she created were, "Ensayo Sobre Todo Trabajo Domestico" (Essay on All Domestic Work) and Cuaderno de Tareas. Ensayo Sobre Todo Trabajo Domestico, is a photographic essay on domestic work, from 1978, containing many photographs that capture the daily lives of domestic workers. Cuaderno de Tareas, is also a project in essay form, that documents (from 1978-1981) a domestic worker; Jiménez shadowed a specific female domestic worker. In this project, viewers can see the pictures of the domestic worker performing her paid job, such as cleaning and washing clothes. Jiménez decided to highlight "focus" on the worker's hands “as she cooked, cleaned the bathroom, washed by hand, folded clothes, wrote on her type writer, and used the sewing machine." Cecilia Fajardo-Hill claims, that Jiménez's work in this project was intended to “recognize” the “value of work in the home” which was an issue that many feminist wrote about during this time.

Ana Victoria Jiménez's photographic style was highly associated with radical feminism by the end of the 1970s. According to Ana Victoria Jiménez, her style in photography was spontaneous when she first began to take photos. She utilized journals to read about techniques, but she did not know how to professionally handle a camera; she took photos as she pleased. After receiving some training in 1975, Jiménez claims to have known how to better handle a camera and take pictures. Before her training, she states that, she would capture images by a far distance because she was "afraid of the camera", but afterwards, she began to get close to the people she captured. During her time of working with collaborative groups, Jiménez built a dark room in her home, where she learned to develop photolithographs to produce negatives for print productions. She even experimented with photolithography to print her own photographs and works.

=== International Dinner Party ===
The International Dinner Party, was organized by Suzanne Lacy to celebrate her mentor, Judy Chicago. This exhibition was created in the context of Chicago's first exhibition. It took place at the San Francisco Museum of Modern Art. Jiménez documented and participated in this exhibition, which consisted of thirty-nine ceramic dinner sculpture plates on a table, tablecloths with metal, scraps of leather, and pieces of wood. The display was forty-four meters long and was displayed to the public for three months. Aside from recognizing Judy Chicago, the exhibition was also dedicated to many outstanding women like: Elvira Trueba, Adelina Zendejas, Amalia Castillo Ledón and Concha Michel.

=== "El juego de la sirena tratando de romper el círculo sin fin" ===
With Tlacuilas y Retrateras, Jiménez photographed and participated in the organized performance, "La Fiesta de Quinceaños", for an audience of more than two-thousand people. This performance took place at the San Carlos Academy, in downtown Mexico City. The performance was organized with the goal to analyze the event of quinceñeras, a "traditional celebration that marks the sexual rite of passage from girlhood to womanhood". The group staged performances imitating the dance usually performed by fifteen-year-old girls and their male chaperones. Other performances by Maris Bustamante, Mónica Mayer, Victor Lerma and Ruben Valencia formed part of "La Fiesta de Quinceaños". Aside from photographing the event, Jiménez created her own board game based on the board game, Snakes and Ladders, which she titled, "El juego de la sirena tratando de romper el círculo sin fin'". She recreated the board game by utilizing her own photos. Her version of the game demonstrated the life of Mexican women as a game "dictated by celebrations, traditional myths, and female archetypes including the mermaid, Sor Juana Inés de la Cruz" and social issues (like menstruation and violence against women).

=== Other works ===
Other works she participated in were Encuentro Femenismo Arte y Mujer (1979) and the exposition of Colectiva Mujeres Artistas-Artistas Mujeres (presented in the Museo de Bellas Artes de Toluca, in 1984).

== Exhibitions ==
- 2011- ¿Mujeres? ¿y que más?:Reactivando el Archivo de Ana Victoria Jiménez, Universidad Iberoamericana.
- 2017- Radical Women: Latin American Art, 1960-1985, Hammer Museum in Los Angeles.
- 2018- Radical Women: Latin American Art, 1960-1985, Brooklyn Museum of Art.
- 2019- Mexican Feminism in Protest: The Photography of Ana Victoria Jiménez, Wadham College.

== Collections ==
=== Archivo Ana Victoria Jiménez ===
Jiménez's involvement in the feminist movement consisted of participating in events but, the majority was her documentation of demonstrations by the feminist. In fact, between 1964-1990, Jiménez was able to gather and photograph more than three-thousand of the feminist's actions and protest in photographs and documents such as flyers and posters. The collected photographs and documents, which Jiménez saved, came to interest a group of scholars and feminist artist in 2009. The group's objection was to bring the set of photos and documents back to the public view; their efforts to make this happen became known as the Memora Project.

The Memora Project worked for many years, specifically, until 2011, to turn Jiménez's most recognized work into, Archivo Ana Victoria Jiménez. This archive of hers is located in the Biblioteca Francisco Xavier Clavigero, of the Universidad Iberoamericana, Mexico City. It was first integrated with the exhibition of ¿Mujeres? ¿y que más?: Reactivando el Archivo de Ana Victoria Jiménez, in 2011. The archive is a series, of over four-thousand pieces, of documented and collected photographs, flyers, and posters (collected between 1970-1990), that captured feminist protest and demonstrations in Mexico City. Gabriela Aceves Sepuvelda claims that Monica Mayer, whom was part of the Memora Project, was an important figure that helped transform Jiménez's collections into an archive.

The archive is divided into five themes. The first theme is titled, "La Posibilidad de la Memoria" (The Possibility of Memory), which gives an introduction to the exposition and archive as a whole, and informs the viewers of the content and characteristics of the archive. The second theme of the archive is "De Mujeres objeto a Muñecas en Acción" (From Women object to Dolls in Action), it explores the ways that the feminist movement shed light on many of the stereotypes attached to gender and the social and cultural effects the stereotypes has implicated. The third theme of the archive,"Revolución y Rebelión, Estrategias Artísticas y Culturales" (Revolution and Rebellion, Artistic and Cultural Strategies), focuses on specific techniques that the feminist movement utilized for dissemination and promotion. The fourth theme, "Diversidad de la militancia feminista" (Diversity of feminist militancy), highlights the complexity and diversity of the groups that have supported and been part of the feminist movement; it demonstrates the different ideologies and strategies that were utilized to reach equality of both genders in Mexico. The last theme of the archive, "¿Y tú qué haces?" (And what do you do?), poses an important question to the public, "What are you doing for the discovery and accomplishment of equality for both genders?". It took Jiménez almost twenty-one years after she took her last photo, which forms part of the archive, for a university to accept and publish her work as an archive.

== Publications ==
=== Author and editor ===
After her participation in the feminist movement in Mexico, Jiménez decided to focus on independent writing and editing publications that touched on women's issues. She also published many articles, essays, and interviews in magazines and newspapers within Mexico and other parts of Latin America. Specific magazines and newspapers she wrote for was Mujer y Arte, Revista Fem, Interviú, and Siempre.

- Author of photographic essay, Jiménez: 1985.
- Author of, “Mi primer Diario”, 1996.
- Author of, "Familias en transformación y códigos por transformar: construyendo las propuestas políticas de las mujeres para el código civil taller", México, D.F. : Grupo de Educación Popular con Mujeres, 1992.
- Author of, Feminismo en transición con feminism, 1997.
- Author of, "México, país de ilusiones: Ángel Bassols Batalla, una vida dedicada a la geografía. Notas autobiográficas", México : UNAM, 1997.
- Author and editor of, Columpio sobre el precipicio(narración fotográfica). Mexico City, 1985.
- Co author of, Breve historia de la participación política de las mujeres en México. In: Límites y desigualdades en el empoderamiento de las mujeres en el PAN, PRI y PRD. Las Ciencias Sociales Estudios de Género . Miguel Ángel Porrúa, Distrito Federal, México, pg. 33-61. 2008.
- Co-author of, "Paula Batalla, donde quiera que me paro, soy yo", Cidhal, 1988, pg.144.
- Co-author of, “La Cronología sobre la despenalización del aborto”, pg. 7-14. 1994, found in the book, “Sobre el aborto. Una antología”.
- Co-editor of, Memoria de la Unión Nacional de Mujeres Mexicanas, UNMMAC, México, 2000, pg. 368.
- Co-Author of, "Donde quiera que me paro, soy yo : autobiografía de una jaramillista", México, D.F. : Comunicación, Intercambio y Desarrollo Humano en América Latina, 1988.
- Co-Author of, "Finitas e infinitas : mujeres y vejez". from the series, Cuadernos cuerpo de mujer, Cuernavaca, Mor. : CIDHAL, [2006]. .
- Co-Author of, "DE ENTRE LA DESTRUCCION EMERGE LA RECONSTRUCCION DE LAS CONCIENCIAS", 1985.
- Co-Author of, Sembradoras de Futuros, Mexico UNNAMAC, 2000.
- Co-Author of, Manuales de Lectura y Redacción para personal administrativo del Instituto de Capacitación de la Industria de la Construcción (ICIC).
- Editor of, "La Lleca Cómo Hacemos lo que hacemos" , Mexico, 2008.

== Bibliography ==
1. Aceves-Sepúlveda, Gabriela. Women Made Visible: Feminist Art and Media in Post-1968 Mexico. Lincoln, NE.: University of Nebraska Press.
2. Aceves Sepulveda, Gabriela. 2013. "¿Cosas de Mujeres ?" : Feminist Networks of Collaboration in 1970s Mexico. Artelogie No. 5
3. Antivilo, Julia. Mares De Complicidades. Archivo Ana Victoria Jiménez. Encuentros De Feminismo y Arte.revistas.uchile.cl/index.php/NO/article/download/.../38339.
4. Chazan, May. Unsettling Activisms: Critical Interventions on Aging, Gender, and Social Change. Canadian Scholars, 2018.
5. Cook, Rebecca J., et al. El Aborto En El Derecho Transnacional: Casos y Controversias. Fondo De Cultura Económica, 2016.
6. Debroise, Olivier, et al. Le Era De La Discrepancia: Arte y Cultura Visual En México, 1968-1997; = The Age of Discrepancies: Art and Visual Culture in Mexico 1968-1997. 2014.
7. Gradskova, Yulia, and Sara Sanders. Institutionalizing Gender Equality: Historical and Global Perspectives. Lexington Books, 2015.
8. Mayer, Mónica. “Un Breve Testimonio Sobre Los Ires y Venires Del Arte Feminista En México Durante La Última Década Del Siglo Xx y La Primera Del Xxi.” Debate Feminista, vol. 40, 2009, pp. 191–218. JSTOR, www.jstor.org/stable/42625122.
9. Reyes Castellanos, Francisca and Jiménez, Ana Victoria. Sembradoras de Futuros. Memoria de la Unión Nacional de Mujeres Mexicanas. México, DF; UNMM. 2000.
10. Seminario Historia Del Arte y Feminismo: Relatos, Lecturas, Escrituras, Omisiones, 26 De Septiembre 2012. Museo Nacional De Bellas Artes, 2013.
11. Smith, Peter H., et al. Promises of Empowerment: Women in Asia and Latin America. Rowman & Littlefield, 2007.
