= Louise Parks =

American painter (born 1945)

Louise Parks (born 1945) is an American painter. She holds a Bachelor of Fine Arts degree from the Pratt Institute, and a Master of Fine Arts degree from Hunter College. Her work has been seen in numerous group and solo exhibitions, including Afro-American Artists: New York and Boston at the Museum of the National Center of Afro-American Artists in 1970 and the 1971 exhibition Twenty Six Contemporary Women Artists held at The Aldrich Contemporary Art Museum She has also been active as a curator, working with Milton Brown on a show of the work of Jacob Lawrence at the Whitney Museum of American Art in 1974.
