= Tlacuilas y Retrateras =

Mexican feminist art collective

Tlacuilas y Retrateras was one of the first feminist art collectives in Mexico. It was founded in May 1983 by Ruth Albores, Consuelo Almeda, Karen Cordero, Ana Victoria Jiménez, Lorena Loaiza, Nicola Coleby, Marcela Ramírez, Isabel Restrepo, Patricia Torres and Elizabeth Valenzuela based on a feminist art workshop taught by Mónica Mayer at the Academia de San Carlos, National School of Plastic Arts (UNAM).

The name of the group refers to the Nahuatl tradition of tlacuilos: men and women who, under the protection of the Goddess Xochiquetzal, “focused on the expression and interpretation of the universe of beliefs that ancient peoples held about time, space, their history and knowledge,” that were represented in murals and codices.

In 1984, the Tlacuilas y Retrateras collective separated shortly after presenting their controversial work La fiesta de XV años.

== Context ==
The social movements and revolutionary ideas that swept through the world during the 1960s and 1970s also had an important impact on the arts. Significantly, groups emerged with an active critical political stance as they confronted social problems that demonstrated the possibilities of using art to facilitate social transformation.

The second wave feminist movement, which had begun in the United States and Europe, gained strength along with these social movements. The questions raised by feminism are also evident in the postures of various artists, who exercised "... with greater impetus their right to self-representation, to talk about themselves, to socialize and denounce the problems they faced as women based on the slogan ‘The personal is political.’ Thus, they carried out a series of practices that included, for example, the re-appropriation of their body and the positive reinterpretation of it, challenging gender stereotypes, the questioning of everything understood as feminine and the active participation in protests using aesthetic elements."

In Mexico, feminist women's groups organized in the 1970s, and the ideas of women's liberation that were traveling around the world were also influencing Mexican women's’ artistic practices, Mónica Mayer, Magali Lara, Lourdes Almeida, Yolanda Andrade, Carla Rippey, Rosalba Huerta, Lucila Santiago were some of the artists whose work represents their reflection on being women and their condition in society. But it was not until 1983, that the first art collectives with openly feminist political positions were formed: Tlacuilas y Retrateras in May, Polvo de Gallina Negra in June and Bio-Arte in November. The three pioneer collectives collaborated in some actions together, although each with its own specificities.

Tlacuilas y Retrateras originated during the course on feminist art that Mónica Mayer taught at the San Carlos Academy from 1983 to 1984. Using as a point of departure the social context, group dynamics and the reading of texts written by historians, theorists and art critics such as Linda Nochlin and Lucy R. Lippard, that this group of visual artists, photographers, historians and art critics -Mayer's students- decided to form a feminist art group.

== Work ==
1983

- Research on the condition of visual artists in Mexico.
- Participation in feminist marches against rape and for the decriminalization of abortion.

1984

- Participation in the exhibition by Polvo de Gallina Negra collective titled Las mujeres artistas o se solicita esposa.
- Presentation of the work La Fiesta de XV años.

=== Research ===
The first action they organized as a collective was to conduct an investigation about the condition of visual artists in Mexico. It included approximately 400 visual artists, with whom they conducted a series of interviews with female artists, art school teachers and students, critics, officials of cultural institutions and owners of commercial galleries. Based on the results obtained, they developed the following lines of action:

1. Promote a meeting of Mexican women artists to discuss their problems.
2. Promote the same basic rights (childcare centers, social security, etc.) for artists as other workers.
3. Promote an in-depth study of Mexican visual artists and recuperate the tradition of women in art through promotion among researchers, the center for aesthetic studies, publications, and others.
4. Promote the formation of feminist art workshops, of awareness groups among artists and in art schools.
5. Promote a greater dissemination of the scope of art as a political tool for awareness.

On October 7, 1983, they participated in the march organized by feminists from the National Women's Network, during which they made banners. In that same year, during a protest in favor of decriminalizing abortion, they participated in the creation of a "Corona Luctuosa" which contained various objects and herbs that women use to induce an abortion at home and clandestinely, often risking their lives.

In 1984, they published the results of their research on the problem of visual artists in the feminist magazine Fem. They also participated in the exhibition "Las mujeres artistas o se solicita esposa" organized by the also feminist collective Polvo de Gallina Negra and exhibited at the Library of Mexico.

External audio
- Reconstrucción de la memoria del evento "La gran fiesta de XV años" organizado en 1984 por el colectivo feminista Tlacuilas y Retrateras".

Their most well-known work is La Fiesta de XV años, which was held in August 1984 at the Academia de San Carlos. Through this performance work they sought to:

a) To initiate a reflection on traditionally trivialized themes, b) to conceptualize from a feminist point of view, the sociocultural significance of the quinceañera, achieve a global artistic action that involves the participation of visual artists, intellectuals and the community in general, d) to call upon artists to submit their proposals on the quinceañera, e) to publicize the event in the mainstream media.

These objectives were achieved: more than 2,000 people from the artistic community and the public attended “La fiesta de XV años.” It included performances by Polvo de Gallina Negra, Bio-Arte and Tlacuilas y Retrateras, the organization of an exhibition of works by mostly women artists, and a roundtable discussion with advice for the quinceañeras. They also invited José Luis Cuevas and Raquel Tibol among other celebrities as godfathers and godmothers, read poetry by writers such as Magali Tercero and Patricia Vega, and the closing ceremony was organized by the Polvo de Gallina Negra collective with their performance titled Tres recetas.

In “La fiesta de XV años” they used a visual language derived from Conceptual Art, a transgressive act at the time, especially when addressing issues that were considered irrelevant: the ritual of the quinceañera party, sexuality, the questioning of that which is conceived of as feminine and gender roles. They also carried out a desecration of “cult” art: they dressed the replica of the Victory of Samothrace located in the central courtyard of the San Carlos Academy in a typical dress for the quinciñera party and surrounded it with dry ice.

The media's coverage and criticism was broad and totally adverse, which confirms their work as transgressive feminist intervention in the Mexican cultural-artistic sphere.

Shortly after La Fiesta de XV años, Tlacuilas y Retrateras concluded its existence as a collective. Their separation is attributed to various reasons, including: the difficulty of accepting themselves as feminist artists in a hostile environment, the adverse criticism of their work and the end of the workshop taught by Mónica Mayer.

== See also ==
- Mónica Mayer
- Polvo de Gallina Negra
- Bio-Arte
- Performance
