= Alexandra Rubinstein =

American contemporary artist

Alexandra Rubinstein is a contemporary artist based in Brooklyn, New York. She is known for her use of oil paints. Rubinstein's artworks involve feminist narratives in relation to the third-wave feminism movement, and her works have gained attention through her depiction of celebrities including Drake, Barack Obama, Pope Francis, Jon Hamm, Justin Bieber, Tom Hanks, and Jay-Z performing oral sex on women.

== Early life ==
Rubinstein was born in 1988 in Sverdlovsk, USSR, now known as Yekaterinburg, Russia. Her mother is Russian, and her father is Jewish. The family was given asylum after ten years. They immigrated to the UniteContentious materiald States in 1997 and settled in Pittsburgh. Rubinstein showed an interest in art when she was in high school, attending classes at Carnegie Mellon University.

== Education ==
Rubinstein earned a Bachelor of Fine Arts degree from Carnegie Mellon University in 2010. After graduating, she moved to New York City to pursue a career in art.

== Artistic career ==
Rubinstein currently works out of a studio in Brooklyn, New York. Rubinstein created a number of oil paintings following the realist tradition which were displayed in small-scale exhibitions across the United States.

=== Looking for Mr. Goodsex (2013) ===
This large series of oil paintings created by Rubinstein are images taken from vintage pornographic films from the '80s, predominantly those released around the time the pornographic film called "Deep Throat" was released. The frames were particularly striking as they focused on women's faces during sex, which was historically uncommon. There was a focus in the videos on women. The series of paintings then branched out into stills of men and women kissing to show vulnerability and the nature of sexual pleasure and romance.

=== Celebrity Cunnilingus (2014) ===
This series of oil paintings includes a variety of male celebrities during coitus including Damien Hirst, Drake, Pope Francis, Jon Hamm, Justin Bieber, Tom Hanks, Jay-Z, Justin Bieber, Ryan Gosling, Leonardo DiCaprio, James Franco and Barack Obama. Within this series, Rubinstein aims to empower women through the portrayal of pleasure from a female point of view. Rubinstein created this series after realizing there was a lack of focus on women in pornography. Rubinstein also includes herself in most of her works, particularly prominently in this series, to tell her story.

=== Thirsty (2015) ===
This series focused on the nature of heterosexual female sexuality through oil-on-panel images of '70s male porn stars. Rubinstein hoped to rattle the art world by representing women as the consumers of nude male imagery, rather than depicting women as objects being consumed. The works use a bottle opener to mimic the common decorative use of the female form, highlighting the notion that men are made into objects of ‘thirst,’ similar to that which follows a beer. The imagery promotes the idea that women are independent and can also have a beer, which is considered to be a male beverage.

=== Hands off my Cuntry (January 11, 2017) ===
This exhibition was curated by Savannah Spirit and displayed at the Undercurrent Projects in New York City. The show was featured in Spirit's HOTTER THAN JULY series and was displayed a week before Donald Trump's inauguration. The collection focused on erotic imagery and was designed to poke fun at Trump's right wing cabinet. 12 different artists contributed art pieces to the exhibition and 20 percent of the profits from the show went toward Planned Parenthood. This exhibition focused on the celebration of female sexuality in a provocative manner.

This exhibition gained Rubinstein a lot of publicity, particularly due to the presence of the then well-known painting "Thanks Obama" (2016, oil on panel) used in promotional products such as posters and flyers. The image is a photo-realistic painting of Barack Obama smiling, ready to perform cunnilingus on a faceless woman. The exhibition received a lot of backlash, especially Rubinstein's painting, because it was deemed "offensive and disrespectful." One of Rubinstein's paintings from the Thirsty series was also featured in the exhibition. The show's focus on erotica captured people's attention and brought them into the exhibition. Rubinstein's works consist of erotic nature, and the imagery she created brings attention to her personal beliefs.

== Style ==
Rubinstein is inspired by her adolescent trauma that continues to persist. Her work explores the relationships between gender, power, consumption, and culture. Through combining ordinary images with explicit ones, she creates a narrative that challenges traditional social constructs. Although she rarely depicts women, her work still includes both the cisgender and heterosexual female gaze of men's bodies depicted as passive and subject to scrutiny. With a focus on male genitalia, Rubinstein's art speaks about traditional masculinity and how it plays a role in intimidation and oppression in contemporary society.

Rubinstein's style is hyper-realistic and contemporary with a particular focus on female sexuality.

The oil on panel medium helps create the authenticity of human figures in her paintings, and the metaphors in the titles help convey her message.

== Reception ==
Some art critics have found Rubinstein's works offensive or revealing due to their overtly sexual content. Some news sources, such as BuzzFeed, have praised her works for the use of famous celebrities, not for the representation of female empowerment.
