= Anita Wetzel =

American artist

- Wetzel operating the hydraulic press at the Women's Studio Workshop (WSW) in 1979
- Born: May 27, 1949; Sauquoit, New York
- Died: March 14, 2021 (aged 71); Rosendale, New York
- Known for: book artist
- Website: anitawetzel.com

Anita Lynn Wetzel (1949 - 2021) was an American artist and co-founder of the Women's Studio Workshop.

== Biography ==
Wetzel was born on May 27, 1949, in Sauquoit, New York. She studied at the State University of New York at New Paltz. In 1974 she co-founded the Women's Studio Workshop (WSW) in Rosendale, New York along with fellow artists Ann Kalmbach, Tatana Kellner, and Barbara Leoff Burge.

Wetzel's interest in paper arts influenced WSW's focus on papermaking and artist's books. The workshop is still in existence and still publishes artists books.

She worked at WSW until 1980, when she departed for New York City, returning in 1995 where she served as director of development until 2017. She died on March 14, 2021, in Rosendale, New York.

Her work is in the collection of the Hudson Valley Visual Art Collections Consortium, Brooklyn Museum, the MassArt Library, the Smithsonian Libraries Artists' Books collection, and the library of the National Museum of Women in the Arts.

In 2021 WSW held a retrospective of her work entitled Walking Lightly, With Intention. The same year WSW created the Anita Wetzel Residency Grant.
