= Maris Bustamante =

Mexican interdisciplinary artist

- Born: November 20, 1949 (age 76); Mexico City
- Known for: Conceptual art; sculpting; theater; acting
- Notable work: La patente del Taco, 1979 Contra los superhéroes gringos,1979

Maris Bustamante (born November 10, 1949) is a Mexican transdisciplinary artist. She has presented her work in 21 solo exhibitions and over 400 group shows in Mexico and internationally. She has conceived, written, produced and executed more than 250 performances, installations, environments and two big “contraespectáculos” (anti-shows). Bustamante has also presented performance art pieces through television broadcasts, which she called "social performances" involving the non-arts public. She also designs sets, costumes, and props for theatre, television, and cinema. Bustamante is a respected teacher and for more than thirty years has been a professor at the Universidad Autónoma Metropolitana de la Unidad Azcapotzalco. Since the 1990s she has maintained a robust career as a researcher and writer on themes related to conceptual art, performance, and participation. Her writing has appeared in seminal books and exhibition catalogues, including Corpus Delecti: Performance Art of the Americas (2000), Arte [no es] Vida: Actions by Artists of the Americas, 1960–2000 (2008), and Asco: Elite of the Obscure, 1972–1987 (2011).

== Education ==
She studied at Escuela Nacional de Pintura Y Escultura "La Esmeralda", one of the two top art schools in Mexico, from 1968 to 1973.

== Artwork and performance ==
In the 1970s, she began working as a conceptual artist, participating in the Groups ("Los Grupos") Movement in México City. She worked with the group "NO GRUPO" since its founding in 1979, until its dissolution six years later. Since producing her first happening in 1971, she has researched non-traditional narratives.

From 1977 to 1983, No Grupo staged several performances each year. In 1979, Bustamante spearheaded their extremely satirical Patente del Taco (1984). The piece primarily consisted of Bustamante’s application for and reception of a patent for the taco, an indigenous Mexican food. The taco and patent were photographed in erotic ways, with the food arranged vertically and decorated with slogans such as “Atrévase a cometer un acto erótico cómase un taco” (commit an erotic act: eat a taco). The images were then blown up to a cartoonish side to symbolize the inflated role of machismo in Mexican culture.

In 1983, with Mónica Mayer, she founded the first feminist art collective in Mexico, Polvo de Gallina Negra (Black Hen Powder). Bustamante and Mayer's work combined radical social criticism and humour, exemplified by the group’s name: “Black Hen Powder – to protect us from the patriarchal magic which makes women disappear.”

For one performance, ¡MADRES! (1984), Bustamante and Mayer became pregnant at the same time so they could experience the conditions of pregnancy in Mexico. One element of the performance was a television series on Canal 2 de Televisa Mexico called “Mother for a Day,” in which Bustamante and Mayer “impregnated” famous men like anchorman Guillermo Ochoa (1987). A key discussion topic on the show was domestic life, with a focus on the massive amount of labor that goes into motherhood.
