= Hương Ngô =

Hong-Kong-born artist

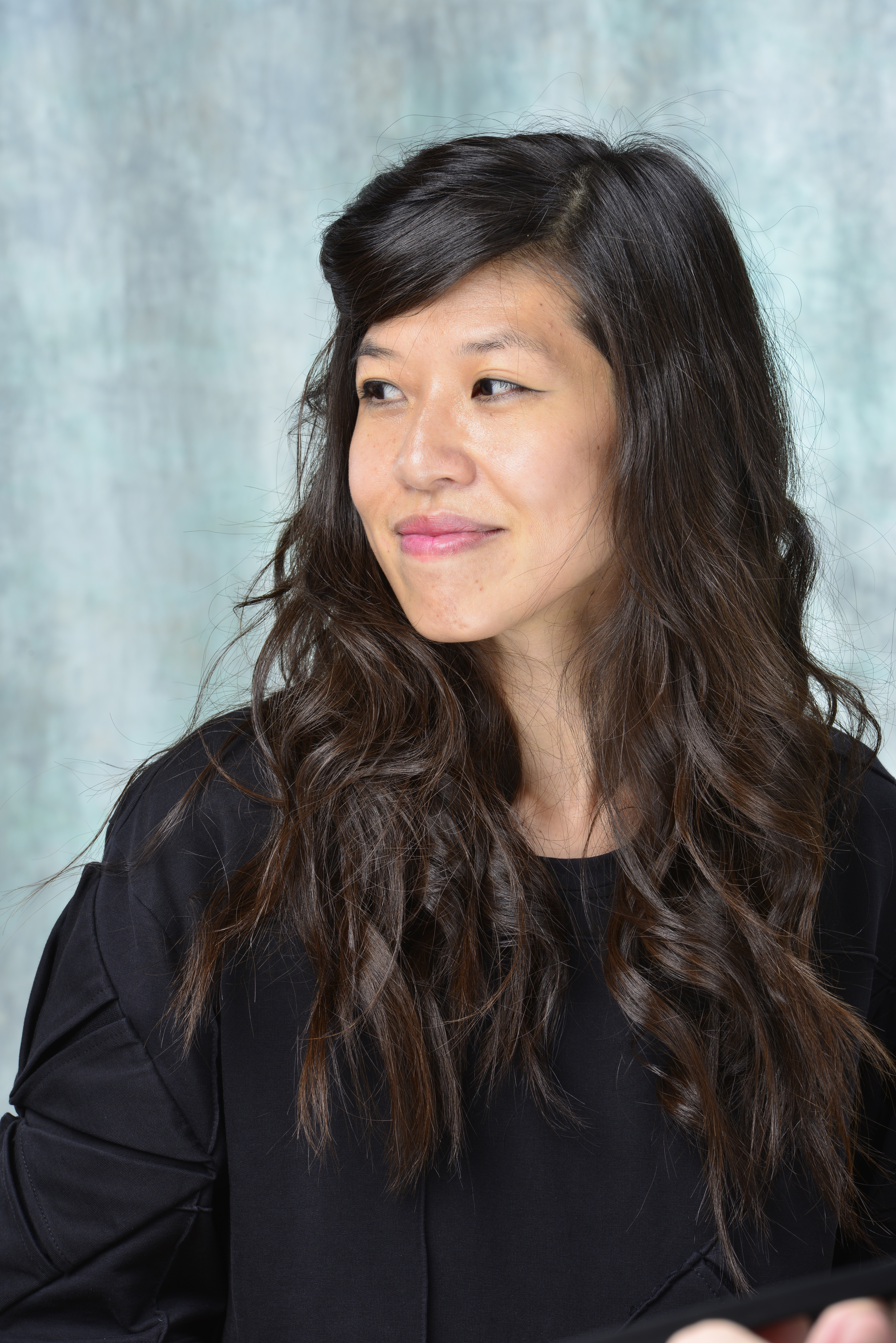
- Ngô in 2022
- Born: Hong Kong
- Education: University of North Carolina
- Years active: 2004–present

Hương Ngô is a Hong-Kong-born artist currently living in Chicago, Illinois. Her art practice is conceptual, research-based, and often takes the form of installation, printmaking, and non-traditional mediums. She received her BFA from University of North Carolina at Chapel Hill (2001), and her MFA in Art & Technology Studies from the School of the Art Institute of Chicago (2004) and is a graduate of the Whitney Independent Study Program. She is assistant professor at the School of the Art Institute of Chicago.

== Themes ==
Recurring themes in Ngô's work include decoloniality, intersectional feminism, and migration. Her most recent projects examine the history of women involved in the anti-colonial movement of French Indochina. Her work ESCAPE was a public performance. Other projects deal with political surveillance on oppressed populations.

== Works ==
In her exhibition To Name It Is to See It, at the DePaul Art Museum Ngô used fabric printed with patterns from a historical mural in the Paris Museum of the History of Immigration, combined with primary source material from several archives to comment on the role of women within the anti-colonial movement of French Indochina to reveal the intersectional effects of surveillance in political movements.

A figure who rises to the surface in Ngô's work is Nguyễn Thị Minh Khải (1910-1931), Vietnamese revolutionary and a leader of the Indochinese Communist Party during the 1930s. In her essay, art historian Faye Gleisser writes that Ngô, "makes materially manifest the discursive and collective historical process of ideology formation: the making and unmaking of Nguyễn Thị Minh Khải, the event". In her essay, Document as Event, art historian Nora Taylor writes that "Ngô considers her interventions [in the archives] to be performances of tests through acts of translation."

In the work The Opposite of Looking is Not Invisibility. The Opposite of Yellow is Not Gold, made in collaboration with artist Hồng-Ân Trương, the artists pair vernacular photographs of their mothers with texts from 1970s-era US congressional hearings regarding Vietnamese refugees. In an interview, the artists speak about their process and importance of working with family photographs:

We searched popular visual culture for images of Vietnamese Americans, but it turns out that public visual records have rarely included images of Asian Americans. So, we turned instead to the domestic archive and searched our own family albums for photographs of our mothers working as a way of making our mothers’ labor visible vis-à-vis the racialized body. We realized there was a common vernacular language at play in both of our families, and we began to pair up photographs in which our mothers’ labor had been erased, made hypervisible, or rendered invisible through their embodied performance as the successful refugee or the loving caretaker.

Hương Ngô has exhibited at the Museum of Modern Art as part of New Photography, 2018, Prospect 5 Triennial in New Orleans, and the Prague Biennial of 2005. She has exhibited at the Museum of Contemporary Art, Chicago, Contemporary Arts Center, Cincinnati, Kemper Museum of Contemporary Art, Kansas City, and the Madison Museum of Contemporary Art.

She is assistant professor at the School of the Art Institute of Chicago.

== Collections ==
Her works are in the collection of the Museum of Modern Art, Smith College, the Walker Art Center, and the Center for Book Arts.

== Awards ==
- Illinois Arts Council Fellowship, 2020
- 3Arts Next Level Award, 2020
- Camargo Core Fellow, 2018
