= Reeva Potoff =

American visual artist (born 1941)

- Born: 1941 (age 84–85); Waterbury, Connecticut, US
- Education: Yale University; Pratt Institute
- Known for: Sculpture, installation art, prints
- Awards: Rome Prize; New York Foundation for the Arts
- Website: reevapotoff.com

Reeva Potoff, Bristol Bluffs, Cardboard and architectural tracing paper, !2' x 8' x 32', 1977–78, Museum of Modern Art.

Reeva Potoff (born 1941) is an American visual artist based in New York City. Critics observe that her work takes a feminist approach that explores the observable world in order to emphasize themes such as impermanence, transformation and alternate modes of existence. From the 1970s to the mid-1990s, Potoff created monumental sculptural installations made from found and ephemeral materials, which investigated natural forms like cliffs, rock outcroppings or topographic terrain. Beginning in the late 1990s, she shifted toward collage-like, photo-based wall pieces, prints and scrolls whose imagery includes organic forms ranging from anthropomorphic to microbial, among other elements. New York Times critic Ken Johnson described her grid-based "Zero Gravity" printworks depicting an underwater female swimmer as "analytic yet evocative" with an "effect [that] is like a modern stained-glass window and almost mystically haunting."

Potoff has had solo exhibitions at the Museum of Modern Art (MoMA), Brooklyn Museum, and Indianapolis Museum of Art. Her work has appeared in group shows at the Aldrich Contemporary Art Museum, Institute of Contemporary Art, Philadelphia, Maryland Institute College of Art, and Newhouse Center for Contemporary Art, among others. Potoff has been awarded the Rome Prize, the New York Foundation for the Arts Murray Reich Distinguished Artist Award, and fellowships from the National Endowment for the Arts, MacDowell and Yaddo, among other recognition.

== Life and career ==
Potoff was born in 1941 and grew up in Waterbury, Connecticut. She has lived in New York since 1965. She studied art at Pratt Institute and Yale University, earning a BFA and MFA, respectively. After graduating, Potoff became involved in the feminist art movement and was later a member of the anonymous activist group, the Guerrilla Girls.

Potoff was featured in the MoMA exhibition "Projects: Reeva Potoff" (1978) as part of the Elaine Dannheisser Projects Series, as well as solo exhibitions at Louis Meisel Gallery (1980), the Brooklyn Museum (1991), Indianapolis Museum of Art (1992), Dartmouth College (1997) and Kouros Gallery (New York, 2001), among others. She appeared in group shows at the Albright-Knox Gallery ("Paper on Paper," 1980) and Artpark, and in the historic Aldrich Museum surveys "Twenty Six Contemporary Women Artists" (1971, curated by Lucy R. Lippard) and "52 Artists: A Feminist Milestone" (2022), which commemorated the earlier show.

Potoff taught art from 1971 to 2023, including terms at Bennington College, Princeton University, Columbia University (1981–99) and Pratt Institute (1987–89, 1999–2023).

== Sculptural installations, 1969–96 ==
Potoff's work throughout the 1970s centered on cliff-inspired sculptures and large-scale reliefs made from discarded cardboard and paper found in the streets of SoHo. The transient materials and displacement of archetypal landscape forms to interior settings underscored a sense of nature having been transformed into a cultural artifact. These installations included the Mica Schist works (1971–73), based on a rock outcropping in Central Park, and Bristol Bluffs, a 12-foot-high, 32-foot-long sculpture created at MoMA in 1978. Artforum critic Leo Rubinfien related the latter piece to disparate work—the metal reliefs of Frank Stella, the patchworks of Lucas Samaras and postminimalism—describing it as a "sort of Deco abstraction" that addressed nature with a critical sense of both celebration and irony.

In the 1980s, Potoff turned to permeable and transparent materials such as wire, mesh and netting in works that emphasized relationships between form, space and viewer. Tower of Babel (1989) was a 40-foot-long, sling-like net pasted with dictionary pages and dressmaking patterns that draped down from the railing of the Newhouse Center's second floor. An Artpark project, entitled Kindling (1990–91), consisted of lights and netting spread over arranged branches that illuminated the interior of a gorge. As the ambient light diminished, the artificial lights intensified, creating a light-filled ravine that extended from the Niagara park to the river below. In 1991, Potoff created the 20' by 60' by 40' installation Sewing and Reaping, A Weavers Tale for the grand lobby of the Brooklyn Museum. The work juxtaposed two tall, conical shapes and two forms constructed out of branches that were connected diagonally by transparent nets consisting of carbon paper, string, leaves, branches and encyclopedia pages. The intersecting nets swayed slightly, introducing an element of movement and lyricism to the monumental scale of the installation.

== Photo-based collages and wallworks, 1997–present ==
Reeva Potoff, Mold and Grey Stucco Wall, Inkjet print installation, archival inkjet prints, acetate insects, 12'3" x !0' x 12", 2000–03, Aldrich Museum of Contemporary Art.

Art in America critic Carey Lovelace suggests that Potoff's shift to photo-based wallworks in the late 1990s retained concerns from her 1970s installation practice: "an emphasis on materiality and process, the push/pull of surface versus depth and a reinterpretation of the female represented as object." The "Zero Gravity" series (1996–2005) featured underwater swimmers presented in a mediating, slightly loose grid format that ranged from single-page-size to 8-foot-square. Each image was printed as single color transparent acetates, with the grid configuration enabling Potoff to layer or control the hue or value of any given segment. The series was described as dreamlike and striking in its exploration of weightlessness, ambiguous underwater space and dark translucency.

Potoff's later print series feature a variety of forms—birds, alphabetic and numerical symbols, insects, and microbial forms such as mold, bacteria and viruses—arranged ambiguously across the picture plane. They consider themes such as growth, transformation, the passage of time and intricacies found in microscopic organisms. The towering print installation, Mold and Grey Stucco Wall (2000–03, Aldrich Museum) featured three archival inkjet prints of enlarged, micrographic images of mold initially grown in coffee dregs. These prints unspooled to the floor, giving the impression of scrolls, wallpaper or organic textiles. Additionally, acetate insects were adhered to the mottled, gray-blue prints, creating a disruption to the illusion of the pictorial surface.

== Recognition ==
Potoff has been recognized with grants and fellowships by the National Endowment for the Arts (1977, 1980), the American Academy in Rome (1980, Rome Prize) and Ludwig Vogelstein Foundation (1991), among others. In 2018, she was awarded the Murray Reich Distinguished Artist Award from the New York Foundation for the Arts. She has received artist residencies from Dartmouth College, the Djerassi Foundation, MacDowell and Yaddo.
