= Neema Iyer =

- Born: 1986 or 1987 (age 39–40)
- Education: Emory University (MPH)
- Occupations: Technologist, artist
- Website: neemaiyer.com

Neema Iyer (born c. 1986 – c. 1987), is a technologist and artist. She is the founder and the former executive director of Pollicy, a civic technology organization based in Kampala, Uganda.

== Early life and education ==
Iyer was raised in Nigeria by parents who are Tanzanian and Indian. She then attended Emory University and completed a Masters in Public Health with a focus on epidemiology and statistics before returning to Africa.

== Career ==
After Iyer moved to Uganda in 2013, she worked in information and communications technology, and then founded the civic technology organization Pollicy. Pollicy focuses on the intersection of data design and technology, and has received grant funding from Facebook and Mozilla. In 2014, she was the Text to Change programme coordinator in Uganda, which included work on a program to improve access to clean water.

Pollicy and Iyer have conducted research, including about gender-based violence in Africa, and online safety for women, with reports illustrated by Iyer. This includes the "Alternate Realities, Alternate Identities" study, in which the team spoke to 3,000 women across Uganda, Kenya, Ethiopia, South Africa, and Senegal to understand their experiences in online spaces and how technology platforms and legal systems respond to them. Pollicy also conducted the "Afrofeminist Data Futures" study, exploring feminist movements and digital connectivity across Africa. Iyer has also worked on multiple civic projects through Pollicy, including "Create Your Kampala", which worked with artists who create murals around the city as a springboard to engage local leaders on service delivery. In addition, her efforts in Pollicy push to highlight anti-human trafficking technology and efforts to engage women in politics. In 2020, after Iyer submitted the concept idea to the Mozilla Creative Awards, Pollicy partnered with Mozilla to create the "Choose Your Own Fake News" game, which her team spent months developing. Iyer drew the characters for the game, and emphasized in her designs the target audience of Africans. Other Pollicy projects include a mockumentary about digital security developed with support from the University of California, Berkeley Center for Long-term Cybersecurity, and a "Digital safe-tea" game designed with a "choose your own adventure" format to promote online safety awareness for women in Africa.

In July 2021, Iyer was appointed to the Global Women's Safety Advisory Board at Facebook. She was a 2021-2022 Digital Civil Society Lab fellow in the Stanford PACS program of the Stanford Center on Philanthropy and Civil Society, ]during which she authored "Automated Imperialism, Expansionist Dreams: Exploring Digital Extractivism in Africa," examining nine forms of digital extractivism and their parallels to colonial practices on the continent.As a PACS fellow, she studied digital extractivism, which she defines as "a form of extraction that’s made possible by digitization and exacerbated through borderless capitalism."Her work identifies nine different forms of digital extractivism: digital labor, illicit financial flows, data extraction, natural resource mining, infrastructure monopolies, digital lending, funding structures, beta testing, and platform governance. In 2022, Iyer and Pollicy announced a Digital Ambassadors program to promote the development of skills and access of young women in Africa to online technology.

In 2023, Iyer stepped down from her role as the executive director of Pollicy, and continues as an advisor and board member.

== Honors and awards ==
- 2021 Quartz Africa Innovator
- 2021 Digital Equality Award, Research and Knowledge Builder category, Coalition for Digital Equality (CODE)
- 2021–2022 Digital Civil Society Lab (DCSL) Practitioner Fellow, Stanford University
