= Ann Kalmbach =

American artist

- Born: 1950; Rochester, New York
- Known for: printmaker, book artist
- Partner: Tatana Kellner

Ann Kalmbach (born 1950) is an American artist and co-founder of the Women's Studio Workshop.

== Biography ==
Kalmbach was born in 1950 in Rochester, New York. She studied at the State University of New York at New Paltz and the Rochester Institute of Technology. In 1974 she co-founded the Women's Studio Workshop (WSW) in Rosendale, New York along with fellow artists Barbara Leoff Burge, Tatana Kellner, and Anita Wetzel.

She frequently collaborates with her life partner Tatana Kellner as Kakeart. In 2017 their collaborative book The Golden Rule, was a Special Merit Honoree at the Minnesota Center for Book Arts MCBA Prize.

Her work is in the collection of the Bridwell Art Library at the University of Louisville, the MassArt Library, the Memphis Brooks Museum of Art, the University of Michigan Library, the Walker Art Center, and the library of National Museum of Women in the Arts.
