= Paula Tavins =

American artist

- Born: 1939
- Died: 2019 (aged 79–80)

Paula Tavins (1939 – 2019) was an American artist known for her painting and sculpture.

Tavins attended the School of the Art Institute of Chicago and the California College of Arts and Crafts. Her work was included in the 1971 exhibition at the Aldrich Museum of Contemporary Art entitled Twenty Six Contemporary Women Artists curated by Lucy R. Lippard. Hyperallergic magazine refers to the 1971 show as arguably the first feminist exhibition in the United States. Tavins work was also included in the 2022 exhibition entitled 52 Artists: A Feminist Milestone. That exhibition celebrated the 51st anniversary of the 1971 show, including the original 26 artist and adding 26 emerging artists.

Tavins work is in the permanent collection of the Aldrich Museum, the New Mexico Museum of Art, as well the Sylvia Sleigh Collection of the Rowan University Art Gallery.
