= Susan Hall (artist) =

American visual artist

- Born: 1943 (age 82–83); Point Reyes Station, California
- Website: susanhallart.com

Susan Hall (born 1943) is an American artist. Hall was born in Point Reyes Station, California. She attended the California College of Arts and Crafts and the University of California, Berkeley.

Hall’s work was included in the 1971 exhibition Twenty Six Contemporary Women Artists held at The Aldrich Contemporary Art Museum and the 2022 exhibition 52 Artists: A Feminist Milestone also at the Aldrich. Her work is included in the collections of the Whitney Museum of American Art and the Brooklyn Museum.
