= Suzanne David Hall =

- Born: Suzanne Ledoux; January 23, 1927; Cherbourg, France
- Died: July 7, 2011 (aged 84); Kingsport, Tennessee, U.S.

Suzanne David Hall (January 23, 1927 – July 7, 2011) was a spy for the French resistance during World War II while still a teenager. During her training to become an opera singer, she relayed messages that helped bring about the Allied invasion of Normandy. The 2003 novel For Freedom: The Story of a French Spy by Kimberly Brubaker Bradley was based on interviews with Hall.

== Biography ==
Hall was born on January 23, 1927, in Cherbourg, France to Étienne and Désirée LeDoux David.

According to Bradley's book, Hall's conviction to fight for France began on the day she and her best friend Yvette went down to the beach. There they met Yvette's mother's friend, Madame Montagne, who was pregnant with a second child. A few minutes into conversation, German planes bombed the entire beach and town square. After the missiles ceased, Yvette and Suzanne looked up to find Madame Montagne lying dead with her small child also dead at her side. It was Wednesday, 29 May 1940. Hall was thirteen years old at the time.

Yvette was also badly injured. She never recovered.

Later, the Germans forced Hall and her family to move out of their house and into a dingy apartment. They used her and other houses on her street as a "home base". Three years later the Germans abandoned the home, and Hall and her family came back to it. All their belongings had been sold or ruined.

Two years after the bombing at the beach, Hall cut herself, and because there was no medication around to treat it, it became infected. She had to see her doctor, a Mr. Leclerc, about the abscess. As she was with her voice teacher at the time, Mr. Leclerc asked if she traveled much for her opera singing. She replied that she only traveled to Normandy and soon would to Paris. The doctor told her that he was a spy as well and asked if she would like to be a spy for the French Resistance.

Hall never told her name to any of the other spies. To them, she was spy number 22, the 22nd spy in Cherbourg, where she lived. All of the other spies she met also had numbers. She never knew their names. She only ever knew Dr. Leclerc's name. He had done this because names were dangerous.

When she was seventeen, Hall was captured by the Germans. She was interrogated for hours, but she never confessed. She was saved when the Allies landed nearby in 1944.

Soon afterward, she found out from another captured spy, number 14, that all of the others had confessed and been killed. Dr. Leclerc and his family had been shot in the street. For her brave service during the war, Hall was awarded the Croix de Lorraine by General Charles de Gaulle.

Hall married Larson Hall and had a son and daughter.

She died on July 7, 2011, in Kingsport, Tennessee, after having lived there for 64 years.
