= Tatana Kellner =

American artist (born 1950)

- Born: 1950
- Known for: photographer and book artist
- Partner: Ann Kalmbach
- Website: tatanakellner.com

Tatana "Tana" Kellner (born 1950) is an American artist known for her artist's book works and as a founder of Women's Studio Workshop.

== Early life and education ==
Kellner is the daughter of Holocaust survivors. She was born in Czechoslovakia and immigrated to Toledo, Ohio with her family in 1969.

Kellner received a BA from the University of Toledo in 1972 and a MFA from the Rochester Institute of Technology in 1982.

== Career ==
in 1974 Kellner was one of the founders of the Women's Studio Workshop in Rosendale, New York with fellow artists Ann Kalmbach, Barbara Leoff Burge, and Anita Wetzel. She has served as artistic director for the workshop's residency program. She produces limited-edition artist's books, as well as installation art and photography.

Kellner has received fellowships from the New York Foundation for the Arts, from the Center for Photography at Woodstock and the Empire State Crafts Alliance. She has received the Ruth & Harold Chenven Foundation Award and has been awarded residencies at the Visual Studies Workshop in Rochester, New York, the Artpark in Lewiston, New York and the MacDowell Colony in Peterborough, New Hampshire.

Her work is included in the collections of the Tate Library in London, the Toledo Museum of Art, the Metropolitan Museum of Art Library and the Museum of Modern Art Library. Her work is also in the collection of the New York Public Library, and the library of National Museum of Women in the Arts.

She frequently collaborates with her life partner Ann Kalmbach as Kakeart. In 2017 her collaborative book with Ann Kalmbach, The Golden Rule, was a Special Merit Honoree at the Minnesota Center for Book Arts MCBA Prize. Kellner has been named a "Papermaking Champion" by the North American Hand Papermakers
