= Polvo de Gallina Negra =

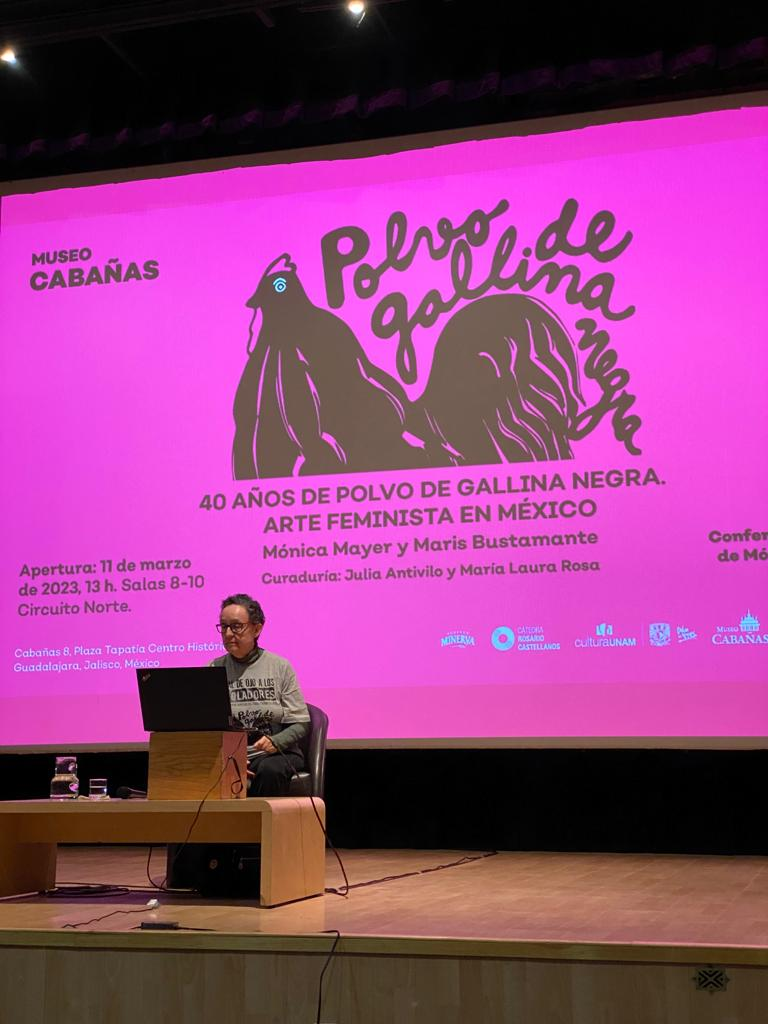
Monica Mayer at the opening of an exhibition

Polvo de Gallina Negra (in Spanish: Black hen powder) was a collective founded by Mexican visual artists Maris Bustamante and Mónica Mayer in 1983, the first group of the feminist art genre in Mexico. For ten years, their activities included demonstrations, exhibitions, conferences, publication of texts, participation in media, performance, curatorship, and mail art. Bustamante wrote, “[W]e grew while we built our families, so we had a lots of fun discovering that the social and cultural reality is penetrable.”

== Context ==
The 1970s were a time of complex sociopolitical change in Mexico, beginning with the crisis incited by the Tlatelolco Massacre in 1968. In the arts, the sociopolitical situation “defined a plastic language that looks for the narrow relation between the village, the politics and the art”.

Following the peak of the Generación de la Ruptura (The Breakaway Generation), the 1960s and 1970s saw the rise of different artistic groups who openly criticized their predecessors as "elitist, apolitical and mercantilist." These movements, known as The Groups, explored activities like performance and non-object art, and used unconventional artistic supports (objects, photocopies) and exhibition spaces (streets, alternative galleries).

In these years, the feminist movement in Mexico experienced a renaissance promoted by university students and urban women from Mexico City. The first feminist organization of this second wave was Movimiento de Acción Solidaria (MAS, 1971) with which Mónica Mayer and Ana Victoria Jiménez sympathized. Soon thereafter arose several additional groups: the National Movement of Women (MNM, 1973); the Movement of Women Liberation (1974); the Mexican Feminist Movement (MFM); and the Coalition of Feminist Women, which, in 1976, coordinated the MNM, MFM, La Revuelta and the Colectivo de Mujeres. Several artists joined these organizations "contributing with their creativity in demonstrations banners and with actions."

The rise of collaborative feminist art in the 1980s stemmed from these critical, cultural phenomena and from the feminist art course taught by Mónica Mayer at the Academy of Saint Carlos (ENAP-UNAM) from 1982-1984. As a consequence of these meetings, several important feminist art groups formed:

- Polvo de Gallina Negra (1983-1993), the first feminist art group in Mexico, founded by Maris Bustamante and Mónica Mayer.
- Tlacuilas y retrateras (1983-1984) initiated by Ruth Primes, Consuelo Almeda, Karen Lamb, Ana Victoria Jiménez, Lorraine Loaiza, Nicola Coleby, Marcela Ramírez, Isabel Restrepo, Patricia Torres, Elizabeth Valenzuela, and Mónica Mayer, whose most important visual project was La fiesta de quince años (The Party of Fifteen Years) (1984)
- Bio-art (1983-1984) founded by Guadalupe García, Laïta, Rose Go Lengen, Roselle Faure, and Nunik Sauret, whose creations oscillated between painting, fashion design, performance, and recording

== History, Goals, and Influences ==
Polvo de Gallina Negra was initiated by Maris Bustamante, Mónica Mayer, and Herminia Dosal in 1983 and was sustained by Bustamante and Mayer in subsequent years.

The group focused on the intersection of art and feminism, and revolved around the constant questioning of women's roles in Mexico, the construction of the feminine image in mass media, and the criticism of violence against women and machismo culture.

Prior to the group's formation, Bustamente and Mayer engaged with feminism and unconventional art practices in various ways. According to Bustamante, “Mexico is still an adverse country for women. [...] The deep class struggle we live, the racial prejudice and the oligarchic values create a social fabric where women are excluded from active roles and attacked directly simply because they are women.”

In her "Feminist Artist Statement," Mayer writes

"I became interested in feminism as an art student, when after a lecture on women artists, my fellow-male students said that women were less creative than men because we gave birth. Considering these were artists from a very liberal, politicized, generation, I realized unless I did something about it, no matter how good my work ever was, it would never be seen on equal terms. After that, a group of women friends from school started meeting and integrating these ideas to our work.

"In 1975 I read about The Woman’s Building in Los Angeles in a magazine and decided to study there. I finally joined the Feminist Art Program in 1978. In the meantime, I participated in the feminist movement in Mexico, in the group Movimiento Feminista and in the Colectivo de Cine Feminista, which was a feminist film collective. At the WB I also did my masters degree at Goddard College and wrote a thesis called 'Feminist Art: An effective political tool.' Suzanne Lacy was my advisor.

"In 1983, back in Mexico, I formed two feminist art groups. One of them was Polvo de Gallina Negra, with Maris Bustamante. Humor was the basis or our work."

The name for Polvo de Gallina Negra (Black Hen Powder) came from a “remedy against the evil eye, which we felt we needed given that we were women, women artists, and even worse, feminist artists.” In keeping with their interweaving of social criticism, performance, and humor, the group invoked their name in feminist incantations, such as “Black Hen Powder–to protect us from the patriarchal magic which makes women disappear”. The group enacted performances, often for the media, and engaged in various social interventions.

For "¡MADRES!"–a long-term set of social interventions on motherhood–Mayer and Bustamante decided to get pregnant and, in fact, gave birth to daughters three months apart. Other "¡MADRES!" performances included inviting prominent men–including a news anchor–to become a "Mother for a Day," and a competition in which people wrote letters to their mothers “with everything you ever wanted to tell her but didn’t dare”. Through the Madres series, Polvo de Gallina Negra became seen as "a champion of an intertwining of the feminist (a particularized political) and the aesthetic in the Mexican 1980s."

Polvo de Gallina Negra faced harsh opposition from other groups, which criticized the group for stereotyping and holding radical views.

== Works ==
- Evil eye to the rapists or the respect to the right of the extraneous body is the peace. Hemicycle to Juárez, October 7, 1983
- ¡MADRES! (Mothers!) - 1984
- The Women Mexican Artists or Requesting Wife - 1984
- The illusions and the perversions and Three recipes of Polvo de Gallina Negra group, 1984
- The mothers also love, 1988
- The New Year resolutions of Polvo de Gallina Negra feminist art group, 1989
- Reanimate fallen auras, 1989
