= Nunik Sauret =

Mexican artist (born 1951)

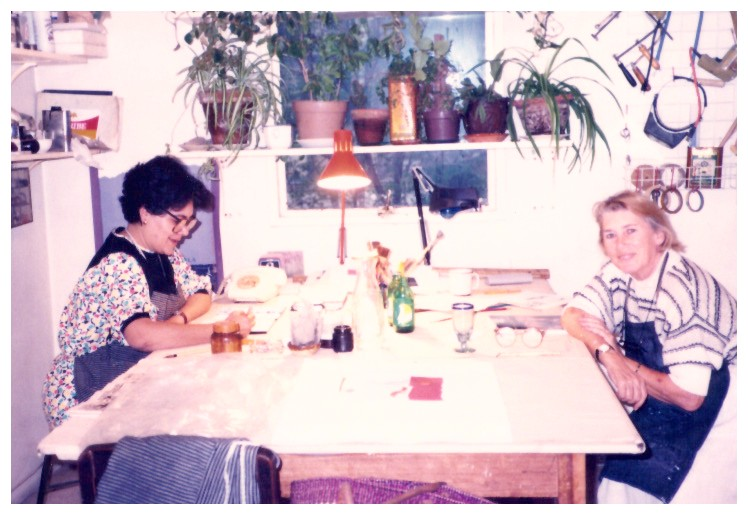
Nunik Sauret and English painter Joy Laville at Sauret's engraving atelier c 1985

Nunik Sauret (born May 12, 1951) is a Mexican printmaker.

Born in Mexico City, Sauret studied at the Escuela Nacional de Pintura, Escultura y Grabado "La Esmeralda" in her native city. Sauret was trained in the techniques of Japanese printmaking and graphics under prominent teachers: Kobayashi Keisei, Tatsuma Watanabe, and Kuniko Satake. In 1976 she became a member of the Taller de Grabado del Molino de Santo Domingo, an engraving workshop that was founded in the oldest flour mill in North America. She has created drawings and paintings, but is known mostly for her work as a printmaker; techniques which she has used include etching, drypoint, aquatint, mezzotint, and engraving. She has also taught, her pupils including Eva Laura Moraga.

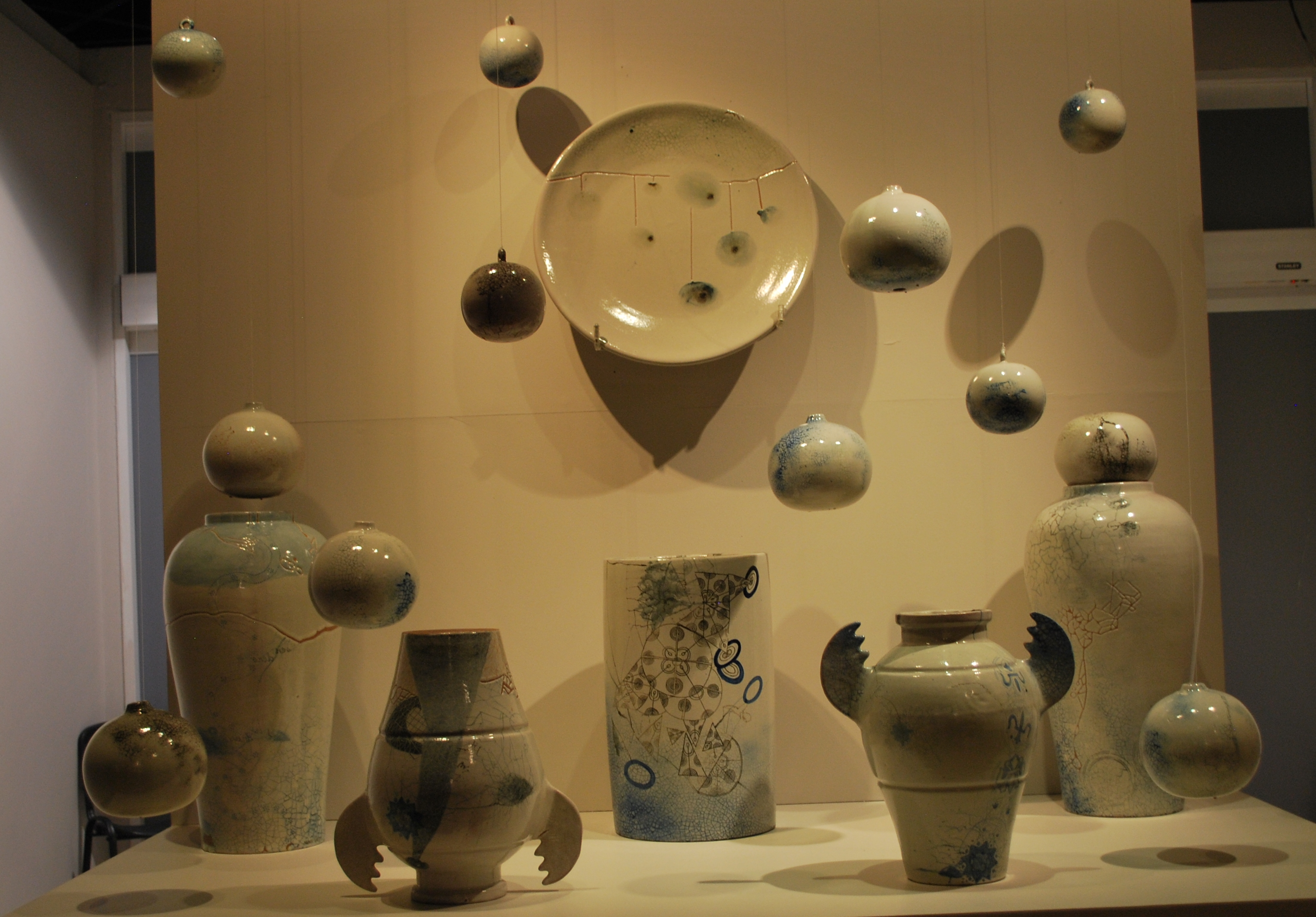
Group of Talavara pottery pieces with non traditional designs by Nunik Sauret and Uriarte Talavera as part of the Arte Sano 2.0 exhibit at the Museo de Arte Popular in Mexico City

Sauret is a feminist artist who has shown work with the Polvo de Gallina Negra group. In the early 1970s, she founded Colectivo Bio-Arte Bio-Arte along with other feminist artists, which was established to portray the biological transformation of women visually. She has shown her work widely both in Mexico and elsewhere, in solo and group shows. Sauret has been featured in more than 100 individual exhibitions including the Galería de Chapultepec (1969), Galería de Letras in Cali, Colombia (1976), Galería Ponce in México (1977), Galería de Arte Mexicano en México (1981), Matisse Gallery in Monterrey (1985), Museum of Contemporary Art in Morelia (1988), Museo de la Estampa in INBA México, (1990).
