= Barbara Leoff Burge =

American book artist

Barbara Leoff Burge (1933) is an American book artist. In 1974 she co-founded the Women's Studio Workshop (WSW) in Rosendale, New York along with fellow artists Ann Kalmbach, Tatana Kellner, and Anita Wetzel. Her work is in the Metropolitan Museum of Art, and the MassArt Library.

== Career ==
Leoff Burge is a co-founder of Women's Studio Workshop.

Her works are in the collections of Yale, Harvard, the Metropolitan Museum of Art and the Museum of Modern Art, among others.

In 2013 Leoff Burge was honored at the Women's Studio Workshop annual Gala Dinner. In 2018 she was included in the exhibit The Golden Age of New Paltz which exhibited New Paltz artists of the 1960s. In 2023 the town of New Paltz honored her 90th birthday with a parade and community festivities.

=== Works ===
- Kunst Comix: A phony art history, Women's Studio Workshop, 1983
- None of Your Damn Business, Women's Studio Workshop, 2009
