= Mablen Jones =

American artist (1943–2021)

- Born: 1943; Nutley, New Jersey
- Died: November 10, 2021 (aged 77–78); New York, New York

Mablen Jones (1943 – November 10, 2021) was an American artist. She is best known for the books she created.

Jones was born in 1943 in Nutley, New Jersey.

Jones' work was included in the 1971 exhibition Twenty Six Contemporary Women Artists held at The Aldrich Contemporary Art Museum.

She was married to fellow artist Robert Adzema for two decades. The couple co-wrote a book entitled The Great Sundial Cutout Book which was published in 1978. The marriage ended in divorce.

Jones co-authored Doing art together: the remarkable Parent-Child Workshop of the Metropolitan Museum of Art with Muriel Silberstein-Storfer in 1982. In 1987, Abbeville Press published her book Getting it on: the clothing of rock 'n' roll.

Jones died on November 10, 2021. She was struck by a pick-up truck when she was walking across the West Side highway near her loft apartment in SoHo.

Her work was included, posthumously, in 2022 exhibition 52 Artists: A Feminist Milestone at the Aldrich Museum. The show commemorated the 51st anniversary of Twenty Six Contemporary Women Artists
