= Audrey Hemenway =

American installation artist and sculptor (1930 – 2008)

- Born: 1930
- Died: 2008 (aged 77–78)

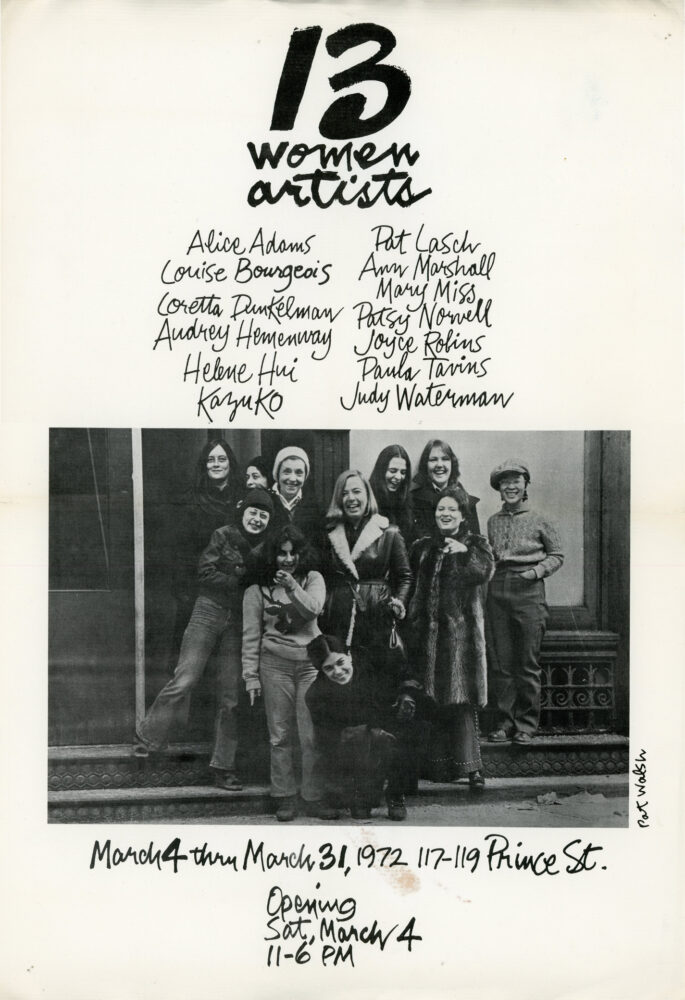
13 women 1972 exhibition poster

Audrey Hemenway (1930 – 2008) was an American installation artist and sculptor. She is known for her land art.

Hemenway’s work was included in the 1971 exhibition Twenty Six Contemporary Women Artists held at The Aldrich Contemporary Art Museum and the 2022 exhibition 52 Artists: A Feminist Milestone also at the Aldrich. In the 1972 she was part of the group exhibition of 13 Women Artists at the 117 Prince Street Gallery in New York City.

Her work is in the collection of the Aldrich Contemporary Art Museum and the New Mexico Museum of Art.
