= Glorianna Davenport =

American sculptor and installation artist

- Born: 1944
- Education: Mount Holyoke College
- Scientific career
- Fields: Interactive cinema
- Workplaces: Massachusetts Institute of Technology

Glorianna Davenport (born 1944) is an American artist, media maker, and conservationist. Davenport attended Mount Holyoke College. Davenport’s work was included in the 1971 exhibition Twenty Six Contemporary Women Artists held at The Aldrich Contemporary Art Museum

Davenport co-founded the MIT Media Lab, then directed the Interactive cinema research group from 1987–2004 and the Media Fabrics research group from 2004-2008.

In 1979-81, Davenport, working with cinematographer Richard Leacock, filmed and edited "Remembering Niels Bohr: 1885-1962".

In 1982-1987, Davenport produced, co-filmed, edited and designed an interactive delivery system for her documentary "New Orleans in Transition: 1983-1986". Conceived of as an in-depth cinematic case study of urban change before during and after the 1984 Louisiana World Exposition, the interactive video disc version of the film as delivered on a Project Athena workstation in 1987 invited students to view the movie based on a particular story thread or character and allowed students to edit material from the film and place it into their written papers.

In Wheel of Life, Davenport collaborated with Stanford Professor Larry Friedlander on a large-scale computer-enhanced theater space and narrative piece, which has become a model for augmented interactive spaces. This work was noteworthy for incorporating multiple users interacting simultaneously with a computer and with each other.

Davenport retired from the Massachusetts Institute of Technology in the Summer of 2008. From 2008 to the present, she has managed the transition of Tidmarsh Farms, a former 610 acre cranberry farm in Plymouth Massachusetts, into conservation and wetland restoration. In 2011, Davenport founded Living Observatory.
