= Mónica Mayer =

Mexican artist, activist and art critic

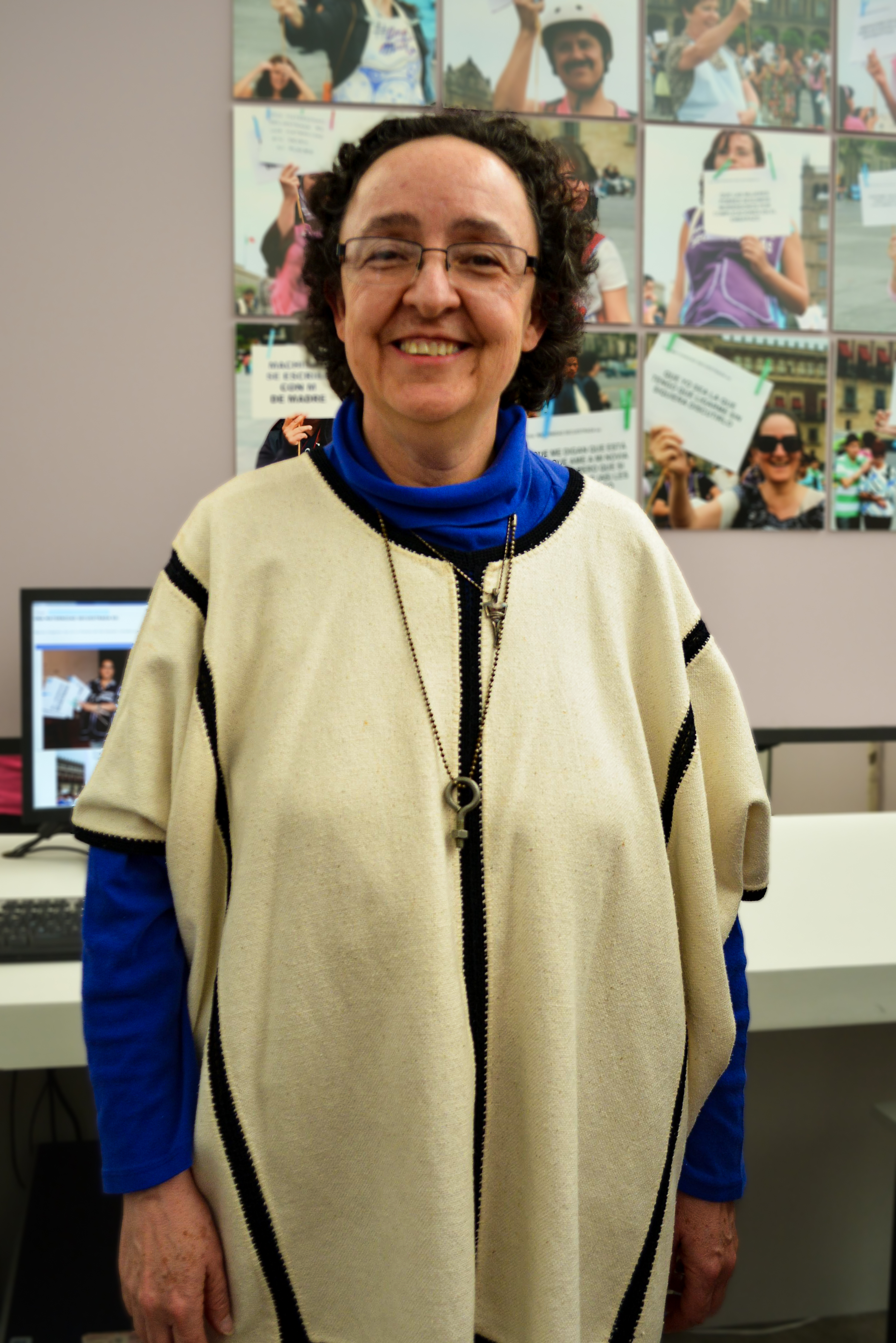
- Mónica Mayer
- Born: Mónica Mayer; 1954 (age 71–72); Mexico City, Mexico
- Education: Escuela Nacional de Artes Plásticas; Goddard College
- Occupations: Visual artist activist

Mónica Mayer (born 1954) is a feminist Mexican artist, activist, and art critic whose work includes performance, digital graphics, drawing, photography and art theory. As a conceptual artist, curator, art critic and art theorist she has been engaged in various forums and groups, and has organized workshops and collective movements. From 1988 to 2008, she was a columnist for Mexican newspaper, El Universal. She continues writing for various blogs.

Since the start of her career, Mayer has expressed disagreement with traditional definitions of art. Her restless spirit, criticism, and sense of humor can be seen throughout her work. Over the years, she has developed an important focus not only on her performances, drawings, and interventions, but also in her artistic contribution through writing, teaching, archiving, and active participation in the community.

== Early life and education ==
Mayer was born in Mexico City in 1954, and trained there as a visual artist at the Escuela Nacional de Artes Plásticas. Her interest in feminism was sparked while studying at art school. She participated in the feminist movement in Mexico with the groups Movimiento Feminista and Colectivo de Cine Feminista. She went on to earn a master's degree in the Sociology of Art at Goddard College, United States, with a thesis entitled Feminist Art: An Effective Political Tool. From 1978 to 1980, Mayer participated in the Feminist Studio Workshop at the Woman's Building in Los Angeles, California.

== Career ==
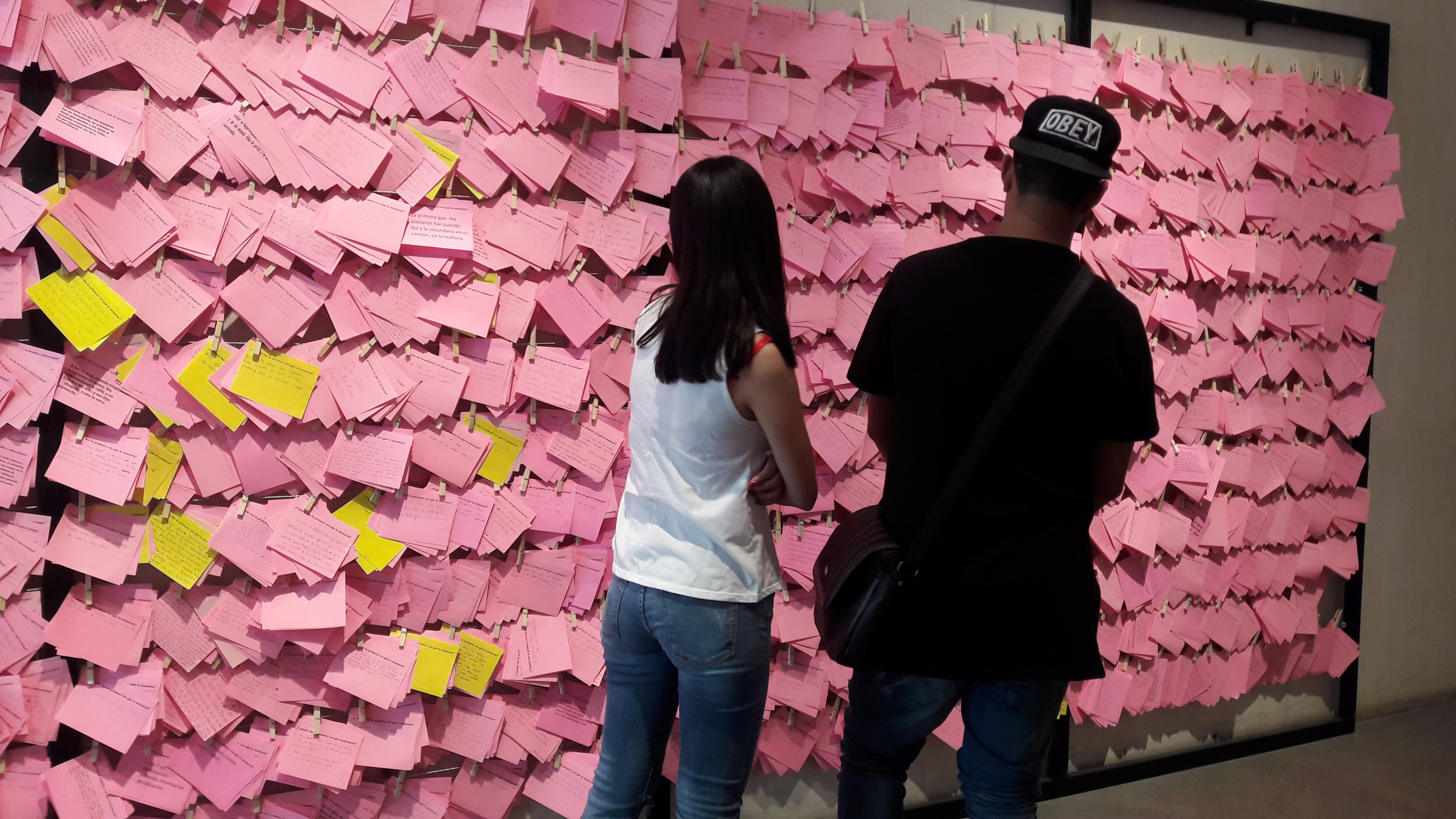
El Tendedero (The Clothesline). Mónica Mayer

In the late 1970s, Mónica Mayer's work took on a performative aspect leading up to one of her most famous pieces titled, "El Tendedero," which translates to 'the clothesline.' In 1978, Mayer walked the busy streets of Mexico City and distributed hundreds of pink postcards to women of diverse backgrounds with the prompt, "As a woman, what I hate most about the city is..." She received dozens of responses back, many of which spoke about the sexual harassment women were enduring around the city, and especially on public transportation. Mayer took those responses and pinned them up in several rows on a clothesline, as you would when drying ones clothing. This demonstration highlighted the issues of sexual harassment and gave a voice to many women who have often been silenced. Its presentation of using bright pink cards is meant to emphasize the female experience and the clothesline is a reference to the domestic daily work assigned to women in society. The first exhibition of this piece was in 1978 during the exhibition New Tendencies (curated by Mathias Goeritz) at the Museum of Modern Art in Mexico City. Because this piece was well-received, it was recreated as a slightly different version and displayed in Los Angeles, CA as part of Suzanne Lacy's project, Making it Safe in 1979.

In 1983, with Maris Bustamante, she founded the first feminist art collective in Mexico, Polvo de Gallina Negra (Black Hen Powder). Mayer and Bustamante's work combined radical social criticism and humour, exemplified by the group's name: "Black Hen Powder – to protect us from the patriarchal magic which makes women disappear." The group put on performances in the media and other various social interventions. That same year, she taught a workshop about "Women and Art" at the Escuela Nacional de Artes Plásticas, which later lead to the creation of another feminist art collective, Tlacuilas y Retrateras.

She has performed both on her own and with Victor Lerma in Mexico and Japan, and has presented her work in various museums. The majority of her performances consist of social interventions designed for specific settings. In 1989, with Víctor Lerma, Mayer created the ongoing conceptual project, Pinto mi Raya, whose main function is a newspaper archive that specializes in contemporary art in Mexico. The project's objective is to stimulate the art system in Mexico by conducting various activities, workshops and performance interventions involving other practitioners such as El Balcón del CENIDIAP, De Crítico, artista y loco..., and El Mejor Amigo de los Museos. Pinto mi Raya has also hosted radio programmes such as "Pinto mi Raya: Donde las Artes Visuales Suenan" (ABCradio, 1999–2000) and has actively participated in various activist actions as part of the artistic community.

In the 1998 publication 'Pinto mi Raya—A Brief Story of Almost 10 Years of Applied Conceptual Art Projects', Lerma and Mayer wrote: "This experience allowed us to detect some of the most serious problems in our art system, and little by little we started turning into a platform from which we could launch applied conceptual art projects in order to try to find solutions for them. In other words, we seek to lubricate the art system so it runs more smoothly. We also decided to become nomads."

She participated in the creation of the Sistema Nacional de Creadores de Arte del Fondo Nacional para la Cultura y las Artes de Mexico (National System of Artists for the National Funding for Mexican Culture and Arts) with the project De Archivos y Redes (From Archives and Networks) from 2012 to 2014, which was renewed for the period of 2015 to 2018.

An exhibition of her work "Si tiene dudas... pregunte: una exposición retrocolectiva de Mónica Mayer" (When in Doubt... Ask: Mónica Mayer's Artistic Project) was inaugurated at the Museo Universitario de Arte Contemporáneo de la Universidad Nacional Autónoma de México (UNAM) on February 6, 2016.

In October 2016, the Instituto de las Mujeres de la Ciudad de México (Women's Institute of Mexico City) awarded her the Omecíhuatl Medal for her "outstanding participation in education, arts, culture, and sports, which have inspired and impacted the development and empowerment of women".

In 2025, Mayer was a awarded the Distinguished Feminist Award in the category of Art by the College of Arts Association (CAA). Since 2007 this award honors "a person who, through their art, scholarship, or advocacy, has advanced the cause of equality for women in the arts." The Distinguished Feminist Award is presented as an Annual Recognition Award by CAA's Committee on Women in the Arts (CWA) at a ceremony at the Annual Conference. This is the first time a Mexican artist is recognized with this award.

== Awards and recognitions (selection) ==
- Distinguished Feminist Award (Art) by College Art Association (2025)
- Medalla de Bellas in Visual Arts category by Secretaría de Cultura del Gobierno de México y el Instituto Nacional de Bellas Artes y Literatura (INBAL) (2021)
- Medalla Omecíhuatl by the government of Mexico City and Instituto de las Mujeres de la Ciudad de México (2016).

== Conferences (selection) ==
Los ríos amputados. Juarez Autonomous University of Villahermosa (Tabasco (Mexico). June 5, 2009

== Exhibitions (selection) ==
- New Tendencies. Museo de Arte Moderno (Ciudad de Mexico, Mexico) 1978.
- Making it Safe. Santa Monica, California (USA) 1979.
- WACK! Art and the Feminist Revolution. Museum of Contemporary Art (Los Angeles, USA)
- La batalla de los géneros . Centro Gallego de Arte Contemporáneo (Santiago de Compostela, Spain). September to December 2007.
- Novela rosa o me agarró el arquetipo" Museo Carrillo Gil . Plantilla:México DF, 1987.
- National Gallery in Kingston (Jamaica)
- Candido Mendes Cultural Center in Rio de Janeiro (Brazil)
- Final&Sigue. Juarez University of Villahermosa (Tabasco, Mexico). June 2009
- Video a la mexicana. De sexo-s, amor y humor. Montehermoso Palace (Vitoria, Spain). May to September 2010
- "El Tendedero/The Clothesline Project." National Museum of Women in the Arts (Washington, DC). 2017*
- "El Tendedero/The Clothesline Project." Indianapolis Museum of Art (Indianapolis, IN). 2022

== Publications (selection) ==
Items of art criticism:

- Reviews by the conceptual space Pinto mi Raya.
- Columns in the newspaper El Universal (Mexico)
- Various items in Performance Research (UK)

Books:

- Mayer, Mónica. Rosa chillante: mujeres y performance en México. México: Conaculta/Fonca, 2004.
- Mayer, Mónica. Una Década Y Pico: Textos De Performance. [México, D.F.]: Ediciones al vapor, 2001.
- Mayer, Mónica. Translations: An International Dialogue of Women Artists. [Place of publication not identified]: [publisher not identified], 1980.
- Mayer, Mónica. Mónica Mayer: novela rosa o me agarró el arquetipo. México, D.F.: Museo de Arte Carrillo Gil, 1987.
- Mayer, Mónica. Una Década Y Pico: Textos De Performance. [México, D.F.]: Ediciones al vapor, 2001.
- Mayer, Mónica, Víctor Lerma, and Alfredo Ramírez. Arte público en el archivo de Pinto Mi Raya. México: Pinto Mi Raya, 2002.
- Mayer, Mónica, Víctor Lerma, Alethia Edurné González Cañetas, and Alejandra Sánchez Avilés. Mujeres artistas en el Archivo de Pinto Mi Raya, colectivas y textos varios. México: Pinto Mi Raya, 2003.
- Mayer, Mónica, Víctor Lerma, Alethia Edurné González Cañetas, and Alejandra Sánchez Avilés. Ojos y vidrio: las fotógrafas en el archivo de Pinto Mi Raya. México: Pinto Mi Raya, 2003.
- Mayer, Mónica, Víctor Lerma, and Miriam Urbano Alonso. Performance en el archivo de Pinto Mi Raya: versión actualizada de Mayo de 1991 a Mayo de 2005). [México]: Pinto Mi Raya, 2005.
- Mayer, Mónica. Escandalario: los artistas y la distribución del arte. [Mexico]: AVJ Ediciones, 2006.

== Further resources (selection) ==
'Mujeres en Acciòn, serie documental de performance', DVD by Josefina Alcazar featuring: Andrea Ferreyra, Edith Medina, Lorena Méndez, Lorena Orozco, Lorena Wolffer, Katnira Bello, Maris Bustamante, Thereza Lopez, Monica Mayer, Elizabeth Romero, Elvira Santamaria, Ma. Eugenia Chellet, La Congelada De Uva, Diana, Olalde, Gabriela Olivo, Katia Tirado, Nina Yhared. More info: http://www.thisisliveart.co.uk/resources/study-room

Henaro, Sol, Mónica Mayer, Karen Cordero Reiman, and Griselda Pollock. (2016). Mónica Mayer: When in Doubt . . . Ask: A Retrocollective Exhibition. Exhibition Catalog, Mexico and Barcelona: MUAC, Museo Universitario Arte Contemporáneo, Universidad Nacional Autónoma de México; Editorial RML Verlag.

McCutcheon, Erin L. (2013). “Feminism Unfolding: Negotiating In/Visibility of Mexican Feminist Aesthetic Practices within Contemporary Exhibitions”, Artelogie [En ligne], 5 | 2013, online 16 octobre 2013.

Zamora Betancourt, Lorena. 2007. El Imaginario Femenino en el Arte: Mónica Mayer, Rowena Morales y Carla Rippey (The Feminine Imaginary in Art: Mónica Mayer, Rowena Morales and Carla Rippey. Consejo Nacional pata Las Artes (CONACULTA), Instituto Nacional de Bellas Artes (INBA) and Centro de Investigación, Documentación e Información de Artes Plásticas (CENIDIAP).

Aceves Sepúlveda, G. (2013). “¿Cosas de Mujeres? : Film, Performance and Feminist Networks of Collaboration enunciated from Mexico in the 1970s.” In Artelogie Recherches sur les arts, le patrimoine et la littérature de l'Amérique latine 5: "Art et genre: femmes créatrices en Amérique Latine, Artelogie [En ligne], 5 | 2013, online 16 octobre 2013.

Aceves Sepúlveda, G. (2019). Women Made Visible: Feminist Art and Media in Post-1968 Mexico. (University of Nebraska Press).

Aceves Sepúlveda, G. 2023. “Re-Enacting/Mediating/Activating: Towards a Collaborative Feminist Approach to Research-Creation.” Technoetic Arts. Intellect, Vol 21, No 2, 175 – 191.

Argüello Manresa, Gemma. 2021. “Feminist Pedagogical/ Conversational Performance Art: The Work of Mónica Mayer.” Aesthetic Investigations 5 (1): 99–110.
