= 1992 in art =

Events from the year 1992 in art.

== Events ==
- 16 March - British fashion designer Alexander McQueen shows his first collection, partly inspired by The Silence of the Lambs (film).
- 12 October – Thyssen-Bornemisza Museum in Madrid is opened to the public as a gallery for the private art collection of the Thyssen-Bornemisza family.
- 31 October – Kunsthal in Rotterdam, designed by Rem Koolhaas, is opened as a gallery for modern art.

== Awards ==
- Archibald Prize: – Bryan Westwood – The Prime Minister (Paul Keating)
- Turner Prize: – Grenville Davey

== Works ==
- Magdalena Abakanowicz – bronzes
  - Becalmed Beings
  - Puellae
- Banksy – First graffiti art (in Bristol)
- Bust of Bernardo O'Higgins (Houston) (sculpture, Texas)
- Muriel Castanis – Ideals (sculpture, Portland, Oregon)
- Grenville Davey – Hal
- Anya Gallaccio – Red on Green
- Gibson/Ashbaugh – Agrippa (a book of the dead)
- Damien Hirst – Pharmacy (installation)
- Soraida Martinez – Verdadism
- Simon Patterson – The Great Bear (lithograph)
- George Rickey – Cluster of Four Cubes (sculpture, Washington, D.C.)
- James Rosenquist – Time Dust
- Brad Rude – A Donkey, 3 Rocks, and a Bird. (sculpture, Portland, Oregon)
- George Segal – Street Crossing (sculpture)
- Jack Vettriano – The Singing Butler
- Christopher Wool - "If You"

== Exhibitions ==
- "Circa 1492: Art in the Age of Exploration" at the National Gallery of Art in Washington D.C.
- Edward Delaney retrospective – Royal Hibernian Academy.
- Richard Hamilton retrospective – Tate Gallery.
- Sol LeWitt Drawings 1958–1992 – Kunstmuseum Den Haag (then known as Gemeentemuseum)
- Young British Artists – Saatchi Gallery, London (featuring Damien Hirst's The Physical Impossibility of Death in the Mind of Someone Living).

== Gifts (Bequests) ==
- Herbert and Dorothy Vogel collection given to National Gallery of Art in Washington, D.C.

== Births ==
- 29 January – George Pocheptsov, American painter

== Deaths ==
=== January to June ===
- 6 January – Richard Mortensen, Danish painter and educator (b. 1910)
- 27 January – Isabel Rawsthorne, English painter and model (b. 1912)
- 19 February – Lena Gurr, American painter and lithographer (b. 1897).
- 4 March – Art Babbitt, American animator (b. 1907).
- 6 March – Maria Helena Vieira da Silva, Portuguese-French abstract painter (b. 1908).
- 11 April – Alejandro Obregón, Colombian painter, muralist, sculptor and engraver (b. 1920).
- 28 April – Francis Bacon, Irish-born British figurative painter (b. 1909).
- 13 May – F. E. McWilliam, Irish sculptor (b. 1909).
- 6 June – Richard Eurich, English marine painter (b. 1903).
- 15 June – Brett Whiteley, Australian avant-garde artist (b. 1939).
- 18 June – Mordecai Ardon, Israeli painter (b. 1896).
- 28 June – John Piper, English landscape painter and designer (b. 1903).
- 30 June – André Hébuterne, French painter (b. 1894).
- 6 July – Richard Eurich, English sea- and landscape painter (b. 1903).

=== July to December ===
- 7 September – EQ Nicholson, English textile designer and painter (b.1908).
- 25 September – César Manrique, Spanish artist and architect (b. 1919)
- 30 October – Joan Mitchell, American Abstract Expressionist painter (b. 1925).
- 12 November – Giulio Carlo Argan, Italian art historian and politician (b. 1909).
- 27 November – Ivan Generalić, Croatian naïve art painter (b. 1914)
- 30 November - Bernard Lefebvre, French photographer (b. 1906)
- 23 December – Vincent Fourcade, French interior designer (b. 1934).
- 24 December
  - Peyo, Belgian comics artist (b. 1928).
  - Stella Skopal, Croatian sculptor (b. 1904).
