= Women's Interart Center =

New York City arts organization

- Formation: 1969
- Dissolved: 2016
- Type: Nonprofit corporation
- Headquarters: 549 W. 52nd Street
- Location: New York, New York
- Fields: Visual arts, performing arts, arts education

The Women's Interart Center was a New York City-based multidisciplinary arts organization conceived as an artists' collective in 1969 and formally delineated in 1970 under the auspices of Women Artists in Revolution (WAR) and Feminists in the Arts. In 1971, it found a permanent home on Manhattan's far West Side.

A trailblazing women's alternative space, the Center provided exhibition and performance venues, workshops, and training courses for artists in a wide range of media for over four decades, with a focus on developing women's skills, bringing their work to the public, and fostering innovation. Prominent visual artists exhibited at the Interart Gallery, which in 1976 mounted the first ever festival of black women's film. The Interart Theatre—the Center's off-off-Broadway stage—and its productions won numerous honors. The Center hosted the Women's Video Festival for several years and ran a video program responsible for a variety of notable works.

== History ==
The idea for the Women's Interart Center emerged in 1969 from the meetings of a group of women from various creative disciplines who gathered regularly in Lower Manhattan artist's lofts and other repurposed spaces to present their work to each other. In the summer of 1970, an overlapping group of artists affiliated with Women Artists in Revolution (WAR) and Feminists in the Arts requested a grant of $55,000 from the New York State Council on the Arts (NYSCA) to acquire a five-story building with space for administrative offices, galleries, and photography and graphics workshops. After the group's proposal was turned down, artists including Muriel Castanis, Nancy Edelstein, Jan McDevitt, and Jacqueline Skiles staged a protest on October 27, 1970. They ultimately received a grant of $5,000.

With this modest funding, the Women's Interart Center (WIC, Interart, or, most commonly, the Center) was established in July 1971 on the 9th and 10th floors of 549 W. 52nd Street, a largely abandoned property near the western edge of Manhattan's Hell's Kitchen neighborhood that had been taken over by the city. As later described by both critic Lucy R. Lippard and scholar Julie Ault, it was the "first women's alternative space" in New York. Co-founder and co-director Jacqueline Skiles oversaw the graphics workshops, and sculptor Dorothy Gillespie was an artist-in-residence. Among the other founding members were filmmaker and photographer Susan Kleckner and actor Margot Lewitin, former stage manager of La MaMa Experimental Theatre Club. In October 1971, the Center was registered with the state as a nonprofit corporation with a mission to "encourage and advance the development and expression of women's skills and creativity in all areas of the arts." A more substantial NYSCA grant the following year helped the group, encompassing over a hundred artist-members, to expand operations.

In early 1972, the Center held a massive "open show" with works by celebrated painters such as Louise Nevelson, Faith Ringgold, and Mimi Schapiro, along with other well-known figures including Yoko Ono, Judy Chicago, and Kate Millett. Later that year, the Center presented its first stage play: Random Violence by Jane Chambers, a key initiator of the group's theater program; first-time director Margot Lewitin would go on to direct and produce dozens of plays in the space. By 1973, Lewitin was leading the Women's Interart Center as a whole; Susan Milano, co-founder of the first Women's Video Festival at The Kitchen, joined to head up a new video program. That same year saw Louise Bourgeois design the sets, costumes, and poster for a Center stage production.

The multimedia organization by 1976 comprised an art gallery, off-off-Broadway theater, artist-in-residence studios, and workshops for silkscreen, ceramics, painting, film, and video, occupying five floors of the original site and another floor in a nearby building. Among the prominent visual artists who exhibited at the Interart Gallery, directed during this era by Francyne de St.-Amand, were Ida Applebroog, Gillian Ayres, Martha Edelheit, Howardena Pindell, a young Sophie Rivera, and Alice Neel, who participated in six shows in the mid-1970s. In 1975, Faith Ringgold curated an exhibition of black women artists. The following year at the Center, Ringgold, filmmaker Monica Freeman, poet Patricia Spears Jones, and critics Margo Jefferson and Michele Wallace organized the Sojourner Truth Festival of the Arts, recognized as the "first ever Black women's film festival". In 1978 and 1979, the Center held festivals of women's music, with concerts at other Manhattan venues as well as the Interart Gallery.

With Lewitin serving as artistic director for more than four decades, the Center presented many hundreds of performance, media, and visual arts events. The Interart Theatre and its productions won ten Obie Awards, along with an array of other honors. In the 1980s, JoAnne Akalaitis directed two acclaimed productions of the work of German playwright Franz Xaver Kroetz at the theater: Request Concert and, with her Mabou Mines group, Through the Leaves, which won four Obies. Other award-winning Interart productions were directed by Glenda Dickerson and Estelle Parsons. In 1985, Joseph Chaikin directed a new adaptation of work by Adrienne Kennedy. Wendy Kesselman, Myrna Lamb, and Susan Yankowitz were among the many women playwrights to have works premiere at the theater. In the middle of the decade, Interart received a Drama Desk Special Award "for nurturing women theater artists" and Lewitin was similarly honored by the Dramatists Guild of America. In the late 1980s, the stage hosted an extended run of Split Britches' Dress Suits to Hire. The Interart Annex at 53rd Street and 11th Avenue, one block from the Center's main location, presented plays in development as well as dance and experimental works. The Center's stages together provided a reliable "home base" for the Women's Experimental Theatre, led by Roberta Sklar and Sondra Segal.

The Center also vigorously promoted new and transdisciplinary media as exhibitor, producer, and educational institution. The annual Women's Video Festival relocated to the Center from 1975 through 1980, launching a catalogue and traveling show. In 1978, Susan Milano produced a major video installation exhibit, Back Seat. As an Interart artist-in-residence a few years later, Shirley Clarke created two innovative video pieces, Savage/Love and Tongues, in collaboration with Joseph Chaikin and Sam Shepard. PBS's Alive from Off Center aired Tongues in 1985 and, the following year, the Center's award-winning video production of Lee Breuer's "doo-wop opera" Sister Suzie Cinema. Interdisciplinary works by Meredith Monk and Lee Nagrin were produced by the Center at venues such as the Brooklyn Academy of Music, St. Mark's Church, and La MaMa.

In the 1980s, the Center became increasingly involved in community efforts to resist attempts by the city and major developers to transform the Hell's Kitchen neighborhood—specifically, the six-square-block Clinton Urban Renewal Area (CURA)—through the construction of luxury highrises and eviction of arts groups. In 1986, after four years of struggle, a community coalition with the Center at its heart defeated such a plan put forward by Ed Koch, New York's nominally "liberal" mayor. In retaliation, Koch threatened to put a swath of the CURA up for auction. "Not only would [an auction] cut out the community," Lewitin observed to the press. "It will cut out anyone who wants to do low-income housing." The local coalition sponsored a community-conceived development plan for the CURA intended to preserve its mix of working-class residents, small businesses, and nonprofit cultural organizations. The Clinton Community Master Plan, designed by Peterson Littenberg Architects, won urban design awards from Progressive Architecture and the American Institute of Architects.

In 1993, the Interart Theatre premiered a fully staged production of an opera by Sorrel Hays. With the city allowing the Center's main building, its elevators in particular, to fall into disrepair, it became increasingly infeasible to bring audiences to the 10th-floor theater. In late 1996 the Annex, now at 500 W. 52nd Street, became the organization's sole stage and the Interart Theatre Development Series, supporting diverse new work, was inaugurated. In 2002, a water tower collapse at 549 destroyed the gallery and left the Center with only one usable floor in its home building. From 2005 to 2015, Blessed Unrest staged ten world premieres and many other events at the Annex as Interart’s Resident Experimental Theater Company. In 2016, to make way for a development project, the Center was evicted from both of its city-owned locations and shut down.

== Archives ==
In 1981, Gillespie and Skiles donated a collection of the Center's records to the Archives of American Art. Additional records were donated to the Barnard College Archives at the Milstein Center for Teaching and Learning. Following the organization's 2016 closure, Lewitin and painter Ronnie Geist, the Center's director of special projects, donated WIC's nearly half-century archive to the New York Public Library for the Performing Arts.
