= Lee Adler =

Lee Adler may refer to:

- Lee Adler (artist) (1926–2003), American painter
- Lee Adler (preservationist) (1923–2012), American preservationist
