= Lila Katzen =

American sculptor (1925 - 1998)

- Born: Lila Pell; December 30, 1925; Brooklyn, NY, USA
- Died: September 20, 1998 (aged 72)

Lila Katzen (30 December 1925, in Brooklyn, NY – 20 September 1998, in New York, NY), born Lila Pell, was an American sculptor of fluid, large-scale metal abstractions.

== Education and early work ==
Katzen was born and raised in Brooklyn. She attended Cooper Union and later studied under Hans Hofmann in New York City and Provincetown, MA. Her first solo exhibition was held at the Baltimore Museum of Art in 1955, when she was still a painter. Later Katzen had solo exhibitions at the Montgomery Museum of Art in Alabama and the Ulrich Museum of Art in Kansas among others. In 1962, Katzen accepted a position at the Maryland Institute, College of Art, where she remained until 1980.

Lila Katzen was discouraged from continuing her study of sculpture by her professor at Cooper Union, who told her that she must be a painter because she “wanted things to happen too quickly” Katzen's paintings were abstract, semi-figurative works, in which she took certain aspects from the figure and related them to a spatial concept. As she developed her skills in painting, Katzen began to look for a challenge by experimenting with different, more sculptural kinds of painting. She progressed from collages on canvas, to staining nylon canvases. Eventually, feeling restricted by even the semi-transparent nylon, Katzen started to paint on acrylic sheets in the late 1950s.

Acrylic paintings allowed Katzen to make a transition into sculpture. She experimented with fluorescent paints and backlights, using light as a medium in itself. In The Pressure Light, Katzen discovered that light was more complex when it could interact with the environment. This led to her exploration of the duality of light as it is confined within the boundary of the piece and simultaneously exists beyond its boundaries, including the spectator in the art itself.

== Monumental sculpture ==
Katzen's experiments and discoveries led her to construct Light Floors, exhibited at the Architectural League in New York City in 1968. Light Floors was constructed in a geometric motif and displayed across the floors of three rooms in the gallery. Both yellow and ultraviolet lights were shown in different sequences through the acrylic. A press release for the installation noted that, “Miss Katzen exercises complete control over her medium. She states that ‘light in all its aspects is employed. Reflectiveness, transparency, emission, and the transformation from spatial to temporal coordinates is situated.’ The result is that ‘arbitrariness and effect are canceled out.” Katzen continued to use light as a medium in The Universe is the Environment (1969) and Liquid Tunnel, an octagonal tunnel that featured fluorescent light shown through water, which played with the variations of optics and the similarities of liquids and solids.

In the early 1970s, completely immersed in and known for her sculptures, Katzen created some of her best-known works, such as Slip Edge Bliss (1973) and Trajho (1973). Both explore the flexibility of their materials. Katzen stretched and manipulated metals, such as steel and aluminum, to make them appear fluid and ribbon-like. The metal needed to be manipulated immediately and with full knowledge of what the artist wanted to accomplish. The artist explained, "No chance for mistakes. You can’t reroll it. It’ll lose its elasticity." Starting with thin sheets of metal foil, Katzen would manipulate and fold the material with her fingers, transforming the cold steel with human sensuality. As Donald Kuspit noted,

"the graciousness of Katzen's supple, textured stainless steel and bronze (sometimes aluminum sculptures) curve like voluptuous ribbon, often climaxing in what can only be regarded as a kind of bow.”

Many of Katzen's sculptures are large outdoor works. All are designed to relate to their environment, which references her earlier trials and discoveries with light. Katzen also designed her sculptures to relate to the site of the work while withstanding and encouraging human interaction, a direct contrast to the Minimalist aesthetic that was so prevalent in the 1960s. Many of her sculptures are rearrangeable and extend the invitation to sit, swing, lie down, or crawl under them. Katzen developed deep emotional connections to her work, considering them to be like her children. She has said that she “feels marvelous when her works find a home”

== Later career ==
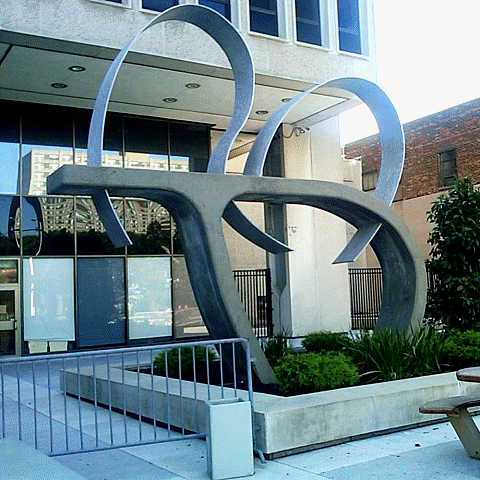
Floten Escort by Lila Katzen (1982) at the Peter W. Rodino Federal Building in Newark, NJ. This work is made from textured aluminum and concrete, and stands 240 x 240 x 36 in. (609.6 x 609.6 x 91.4 cm) in size.

Whereas her best-known sculptural work begun in the 1970s was characterized by smooth, sinuous, rounded curves often described as "lyrical," in the early 1990s, she produced a new body of work whose pieces consisted of welded sharp and jagged pieces of steel described by one writer as "harsh and aggressive," representing a fragmented and fragile culture. Works made during this period were on view in the exhibition "Lila Katzen Quincentenary Sculpture Exhibition: Isabel, Columbus and the Statue of Liberty" at the Muscarelle Museum of Art in Spring of 1992; the works shown included "Exploration Queen," "Queen of the Five Shields," and "Alligator Queen" and created "a rich imaginary portrait" of the "ghostly female persona" of Queen Isabella of Castille. Another exhibition of later work was "Lila Katzen: Force I Sculptures and Drawings" at the Ulrich Museum of Art in the Fall of 1995. Pieces in that exhibition included Nerve Threads (1992), Muzzle Warp (1993), and Paleolithic Map (1993). In an article released in conjunction with the exhibition "Lila Katzen: Force I Sculptures and Drawings", Dana Self, Curator of Exhibitions, noted,

"The past sculptures, while stylistically and contextually aggressive, were often smooth, sinuous, gently rounded and looping steel shapes that demonstrated her adherence to canons of beauty such as the notion that is lyrical and graceful. Katzen cites Italian Baroque artist Bernini's Ecstasy of St. Theresa as one influential example of Baroque form that inspired her to develop floating masses in space that seemed to belie their weight. In her new sculpture Katzen resists art historical influences. Instead, the sculptures in this exhibition are Katzen's interpretation, in an abstract sculptural language, of current social and cultural issues...Katzen puts aside the dramatic lyricism of her former works for a harsh and aggressive style to both interrupt art history and negotiate the present."

Her work is in the collections of the National Gallery of Art, Washington, DC, the J. Paul Getty Museum, Santa Monica, CA, the Ulrich Museum of Art, and the Georgia Museum of Art.

In her later years she took on some workers to assist her in constructing her sculptures.

== Feminism ==
Katzen was also an outspoken opponent of sexual discrimination and was known for her commitment to the feminist movement in the arts. Katzen recounted her own experiences with sexual discrimination. According to her, while her teacher, Hans Hofmann, was supportive of her work while in the studio, he became irritated when he discovered she was serious about her career as an artist. In one incident, during a dinner party that Katzen planned for Hofmann and his friends, Hofmann gave a toast to art declaring, "Only the men have the wings." Katzen was outraged and the two argued. In fact, Katzen's art was viewed differently because of her outspoken feminism: a New York Times review of a sculpture called Ruins and Constructions linked Katzen's use of Mayan motifs to her "militant feminism."

Mary Beth Edelson's feminist piece Some Living American Women Artists / Last Supper (1972) appropriated Leonardo da Vinci’s The Last Supper, with the heads of notable women artists collaged over the heads of Christ and his apostles; Katzen was among those notable women artists. This image, addressing the role of religious and art historical iconography in the subordination of women, became "one of the most iconic images of the feminist art movement."
