= Kathy Pennington =

American artist (born 1953)

- Born: February 25, 1953 (age 73); Seattle, Washington
- Education: Pacific Northwest College of Art
- Known for: Paintings and murals depicting the Black community of Portland, OR
- Notable work: IFCC Kathy Pennington New Works (2000), Black Artists of Oregon (2023-2024), KSMoCA (2026)
- Spouse: Joseph Pennington (m. 1977; div. 1984)

Kathy Pennington (born Katherine Fay Howard in 1953 in Seattle, Washington) is an American artist known for figurative acrylic paintings, murals, and glazed clay tile reliefs. She is also known professionally as Katherine Pennington and K. F. Howard. Pennington lives and works in Portland, Oregon. She resided in the Albina district until age ten when her family moved to the nearby Irvington district where she is a longtime homeowner.

Pennington brings the history of her neighborhood to life in the scenes and characters of her paintings, hoping that viewers will connect emotioally with the subjects. Her paintings often depict family and community gatherings, as well as everyday life in neighborhood businesses, barbershops, restaurants, churches, and bus stops.

Alongside her artistic practice, Pennington was a postal employee for more than three decades, working as a distribution clerk on the overnight shift for much of that time. The job enabled her to focus on art projects during the day to offset the typically unreliable income of an artist.

== Representative works ==
=== Acrylic painting on canvas ===
You're My Tenth Customer (1991)

You're My Tenth Customer was commissioned for Portland's Visual Chronicle project, based on Pennington's proposal to create a painting of the interior of the “Waves” hair salon. It features both a hairdresser and a customer.

The painting brings the Black hairdresser and shop owner, Veronica, to the foreground. Her vivid red dress and a large red earring dominate the scene, making a statement that she is the center of the story. Viewers see only the customer's back and head, with a focus on the placement of curling rollers. But outside the window, a close-up cityscape in muted shades of blue and green looms large, situating Veronica's work in the city. The project required an identifiable location within the city of Portland, which Pennington addressed by incorporating recognizable neighborhood businesses and organizations. Along with the painting's title, little doubt is left that this hairdresser works hard to make a living.

Pennington conveys the message through her careful choice of strong colors in the foreground and muted colors in the background to make a statement by featuring a hard-working woman. At the same time, she tells the story of the neighborhood.

=== Clay tile relief ===
A Song We Sing (2000)

During the 1990s, Pennington made fired clay tile reliefs, such as A Song We Sing, which are based on photographs or public images. The pieces feature molded clay figures that project from the surface, creating three-dimensional designs.

Seven of the clay tile reliefs were displayed at the Interstate Firehouse Cultural Center exhibition "Una Kim & Kathy Pennington New Works," which include A Song We Sing, Ready to Party, The Beach, Field Trip, Alven in Charge, Chillin' and Ready to Party.

=== Cityscape ===
Union Station (1999)

Another work in Portland’s Visual Chronicles collection is Union Station, which is within sight of the downtown Portland post office building where Pennington worked. Along with the themes of everyday life, Pennington often paints buildings, street scenes, and bridges, emphasizing vibrant colors. Union Station depicts not only the building but also close-up and further away sites in the area. Those elements include the Broadway Bridge on the left and the Steel Bridge, Oregon Convention Center, and Portland State Office Building on the right. Another right-side component of the painting is a splash of pink, illustrating Portland’s springtime cherry blossoms in the nearby Tom McCall Waterfront Park.

The painting exaggerates the red hues in the building, a technique Pennington often uses, creating a dramatic work of art.

Other cityscapes by Pennington are Washman, Amsterdam, and Passports.

=== Family ===
Easter Sunday (2000)

Pennington often paints family members in her artwork. One example is the acrylic-on-canvas work named Easter Sunday. The painting shows her mother standing outside of her house, wearing a dressy skirt, jacket, heels, and a hat.

Easter Sunday showcases several of Pennington’s artistic approaches, which include detailed depictions of people and buildings. The painting also features vibrant pink, red, and green tones that appear regularly in her artwork.

Other works by Pennington that feature family members are Alven in Charge, After Church, Summer Daze, Uncle Buck, Double Trouble, and New Car, New Baby.

=== Mural ===
Strong Empowerment Village Mural (2026)

The mural that Pennington painted for the Strong Empowerment Village portrays a scene drawn from Black Portland community life, a theme central to Pennington’s work. Using vibrant colors, the painting shows a view from inside a restaurant, looking out onto the street, enabling Pennington to illustrate a broad range of community activities in a single scene. The cafe's name, MA-N-PA STRONG'S KITCHEN, is centered above two customers in reverse lettering, as would be the visual perspective looking from the inside out. Beneath the restaurant's name is the slogan: GREAT BAR-B-Q. The mural seamlessly incorporates scenes from nearby community locations with enough detail to reveal the actual locations and thereby capture not only the community's daily life but also its history.

On the left, a small plaque identifies one of the three background buildings as Baltzergar's Photos, 4516 N. Williams Avenue, Portland, Oregon, a location that is three blocks from the mural. Baltzergar's Photo's was a Black-owned business in the Albina neighborhood. The business is of historical significance because its photographs document everyday life in the community, including family portraits, celebrations, and gatherings, rather than only public events.

The central scene shows customers in Ma-n Pa Strong's Kitchen, which was a Black-owned business in the same location as the Strong Building. The business served as an economic anchor and community institution during periods of significant change and displacement in North and Northeast Portland.

On the south side of the mural, a plaque identifies the building in view from the restaurant as Dean's Beauty Salon and Barber Shop. Again, Pennington tells the story of Portland's Black community. In this case, the building in the mural closely replicates a historic building on Northeast Hancock, and shows the actual street number of the building.

Other elements include a mother pushing a stroller as she walks outside past the restaurant windows and a woman holding the restaurant door open for a young girl to enter.

== Education ==
Pennington attended several elementary schools in her Portland neighborhood, including Highland School, which is now Dr. Martin Luther King Jr. School, as well as neighborhood high schools such as Washington High. After high school, she studied at Oregon State University for three years, taking every available art class. Because the university did not offer an art degree, she pursued history and social sciences instead. She later left Oregon State University and took art classes at various Portland-area colleges before completing her degree at the Portland Art Museum School, which is now the Pacific Northwest College of Art.

== Notable artworks ==
- Self Portrait (Braids) (1986)
- Marbles (1987)
- Scenes of Learning (1989)
- You're My Tenth Customer (1991)
- Showtime (Dance Theatre of Harlem Performance, Portland) (1992)
- Union Station (1999)
- Shadow (2025)
- Strong Empowerment Building Mural (2026)

== Selected exhibitions ==
- Kusasa, Graystone Gallery (1987)
- IFCC Gallery presents Una Kim & Kathy Pennington, Interstate Firehouse Cultural Center Gallery (August 3 - 26, 2000)
- Kwanzaa on Killingsworth, Albina Arts Center (October 2021 - January 2022)
- Matriarch, Multnomah County Library (February 23 - March 31, 2022
- Black Artists of Oregon, Portland Art Museum (September 9, 2023 - March 31, 2024)
- The Indelible Spirit: Artists in Situ, Revitalizing Old Town, Vanport Mosaic (September 28 - October 5, 2024)
- Kathy Pennington + Harriet Tubman Center for Expanded Curatorial Practice, King School Museum of Contemporary Art (March 12, 2026 - May 28, 2026)
