= Susan Lewis (disambiguation) =

Susan Lewis is a fictional character from the television series ER.

Susan Lewis may also refer to:

- Susan Lewis (writer) (born 1956), British author
- Susan Lewis, Her Majesty's Chief Inspector of Education and Training in Wales, 2008 New Year Honours
- Susan Williams (artist) (fl. 1963–2015), American artist, née Lewis

== See also ==
- Susanne Lewis, German American musician, songwriter and artist
- Susie Lewis, American writer and producer
- Sue Lewis (born 1954), Australian swimmer
