= Minna Citron =

American painter (1896–1991)

- Born: Minna Wright; October 15, 1896; Newark, New Jersey
- Died: December 21, 1991 (aged 95); New York, New York
- Known for: Painting
- Spouse(s): Henry Citron, ending in divorce

Minna Wright Citron (October 15, 1896 – December 21, 1991) was an American painter and printmaker. Her early prints focus on the role of women, sometimes in a satirical manner, in a style known as urban realism. Later in her career, Citron's work shifted from realism to abstract, but still delt with women's social issues.

== Early life and education ==
Minna Wright was born on October 15, 1896, in Newark, New Jersey, the youngest of five children. She began to study art in 1924 at the Brooklyn Institute of Arts and Sciences and the New York School of Applied Design for Women, while married and living in Brooklyn, taking care of her two children. By 1928, she was studying at the Art Students League with John Sloan, Harry Sternberg, Kimon Nicolaïdes, and Kenneth Hayes Miller. whose satirical depictions of city life influenced her own style. She had her first solo exhibition in 1930 at the New School for Social Research.

== Career ==
In 1934, she divorced her husband and moved with her two children to Union Square, New York where she became involved in the Fourteenth Street School. There, she became acquainted with other artists of the movement, including Isabel Bishop, Reginald Marsh, and Raphael Soyer. During this period, Citron often drew her subject matter from her urban surroundings, depicting the people and places of Union Station in an urban realist style. Her work was also influenced by that of artist Honoré Daumier.

In 1935, Citron had her first major critically acclaimed solo show titled "Feminanities," at the Midtown Gallery in New York City. The work in this show addressed issues of gender and sexism in a satirical light; in these pieces, Citron not only criticized men for the subordination of women, but also held women accountable for their own complicity in a sexist society. Pieces such as Beauty Parlor (1933) and Demonstration (1932) depicted women's preoccupation with the culture of beauty, while pieces such as Cold Comfort (1935) more directly address the objectification of women for the pleasure of men.

In the late 1930s, Citron became involved with the Works Progress Administration Federal Art Project, working as a teacher from 1935 to 1937, and completing numerous government mural commissions between 1938 and 1942. Her work includes the oil on canvas murals titled Horse Swapping in the Manchester, Tennessee, post office and TVA Power in the Newport, Tennessee, post office, commissioned by the Treasury Section of Fine Arts, and completed in the early 1940s. During this time, Citron also taught at the Brooklyn Museum School (1940–1944) and at the Pratt Institute. She also became a member of the Society of American Graphic Artists.At this point in her career, most of her prints are lithographs.

In the early 1940s, Citron's work shifted towards a more abstract style joining the growing Abstract Expressionism movement. She joined Atelier 17, a renowned printmaking school and studio which had been relocated to New York due to World War II. There, she encountered numerous artists such as Marc Chagall, André Masson, and Jacques Lipchitz, and began experimenting with new styles and innovative techniques, primarily with etching. During her time at Atelier 17, she pioneered new methods of three-dimensional printmaking and assemblage by utilizing textured materials in the printing process and stacking different colors of ink and paint on top of each other to create a three dimensional effect. She also began to embrace chance, spontaneity, and mistakes in her work and relying on improvisation or automatism, a method consistent with the work of other artists at Atelier 17 and perhaps influenced by Citron's interest in Freudian psychoanalysis and the unconscious, which she had become familiar with in the 1920s. During World War II, her sons served overseas, and her work, like "As Tom Goes Marching to War" shifted to address war time issues. Soon after World War II she traveled abroad to Paris. In the 1950s, she taught art at the High School of Music & Art where she was respected as a teacher who introduced her students to all the possible means of expression from realism to the current avant-garde abstract expressionists.

A 1960 solo exhibit in Zagreb was the first time an American artist had mounted such a show in Yugoslavia. In the 1970s (when she was in her seventies), she strongly identified with the women's movement and considered herself a feminist at heart, although she was never directly involved with organized feminist movements or protests. During the 1970s and 1980s, Citron continued to produce prints, alternating between abstract and representational styles. She continued to work well into her nineties. In 1985, she received the Women's Caucus for Art Lifetime Achievement Award.Citron responded to critiques of abstract art by explaining its purpose and message to the public through lectures and speeches.

== Personal life and legacy ==
At age 20, Minna Wright married Henry Citron, a businessman. Together they moved to Brooklyn, where they had two sons, Casper and Thomas, before their divorce in 1934. She had a longtime relationship with lawyer and philanthropist Arthur B. Brenner; their shared interest in psychoanalysis was an influence on Citron's work.

Minna Citron died on 21 December 1991, age 95, at Beth Israel Hospital, Manhattan. Her papers are at Syracuse University. Her work is in the collection of the Georgia Museum of Art. 116 of her prints can be found in the collection of the Ulrich Museum of Art.

A traveling exhibition of her work, titled "Minna Citron: The Uncharted Course From Realism to Abstraction," was organized by the Juniata College Museum of Art in Huntingdon, PA and the artist's granddaughter. It appeared at Georgia Museum of Art late in 2012, Texas A&M University in 2013, and at University of Richmond in late 2014. It opened at Syracuse University in February 2015. Citron's work is also included in a traveling exhibition "Prints by Women: Selected European and American Works from the Georgia Museum of Art," organized by the Georgia Museum of Art.

Her image is included in the iconic 1972 poster Some Living American Women Artists by Mary Beth Edelson.
