= Women Artists in Revolution =

American collective of artists

Women Artists in Revolution (WAR) was a New York City-based collective of American women artists and activists that formed in 1969. They seceded from the male-dominated Art Workers' Coalition (AWC), prompted by the Whitney Museum of American Art's 1969 Annual (later the Whitney Biennial), which included only eight women out of the 143 featured artists shown.

In 1970, WAR members sent letters to the Whitney Museum, as well as the Museum of Modern Art, demanding both museums change their policies to be more inclusive of women artists. That same year, the Ad Hoc Committee of Women Artists formed and also concentrated on the discrimination of women in the Whitney Museum's annual survey exhibitions. These protest efforts led to an increase of women artists at the next Whitney Annual, rising from an average of 5–10% before 1969 to 22% in 1970.

In 1971, some members of WAR, along with a group called Feminists in the Arts, created the Women's Interart Center, the first alternative feminist space, where they established a graphics and silk-screen workshop taught by the artist Jacqueline Skiles. By 1972, WAR abandoned their efforts to change museum policies and focused more on consciousness-raising that concerned the struggles of women artists. In 1973, two former members of WAR—Mary Ann Gillies and Joan Glueckman—co-founded SOHO 20 Gallery.

== Notable former members ==
- Muriel Castanis
- Silvianna Goldsmith
- Juliette Gordon
- Doloris Holmes
- Poppy Johnson
- Jan McDevitt
- Faith Ringgold
- Sara Saporta
- Jacqueline Skiles
- Nancy Spero
- Joan Thorne
