= Rachel bas-Cohain =

American artist

- Born: 1937; New York City
- Died: 1982 (aged 44–45); New York City
- Known for: conceptual art

Rachel bas-Cohain (1937–1982) was a New York-based conceptual artist. She was a founding member of the A.I.R. Gallery (Artists in Residence).

== Biography ==
Bas-Cohain was born in 1937 in New York. She obtained her arts education from the Art Students League of New York. She also attended The New School for Social Research, the Brooklyn Museum School, and Brooklyn College. She was a graduate of the Brooklyn School of Music and received a two-year grant from the Radcliffe Institute in Cambridge, Massachusetts. Bas-Cohain had fellowships at the MacDowell Colony in 1966 and 1968. In 1972, she became one of the founding members of the A.I.R. Gallery.

Over the course of her career, she worked in a variety of media and styles. She described her work as "air, fluids, light in motion exhibited as sculpture."

Her image is included in the iconic 1972 poster Some Living American Women Artists by Mary Beth Edelson.

Her work is in the collection of the Smithsonian American Art Museum, the Whitney Museum of American Art, and the Indianapolis Museum of Art.
