= Arthur Siegel (photographer) =

American photographer and educator (1913–1978)

- Born: August 2, 1913; Detroit
- Died: February 1, 1978 (aged 64); Chicago
- Occupation: Photographer
- Spouse(s): Irene Siegel

Arthur Sidney Siegel (August 2, 1913 – February 1, 1978) was an American photographer and educator. Siegel grew up in Detroit and studied photography at the New Bauhaus in Chicago, under the school's founder László Moholy-Nagy. His photographs are included in the collections of multiple major museums, including two dedicated exhibitions at the Art Institute of Chicago. Siegel lived in Chicago until his death in 1978.

== Biography ==
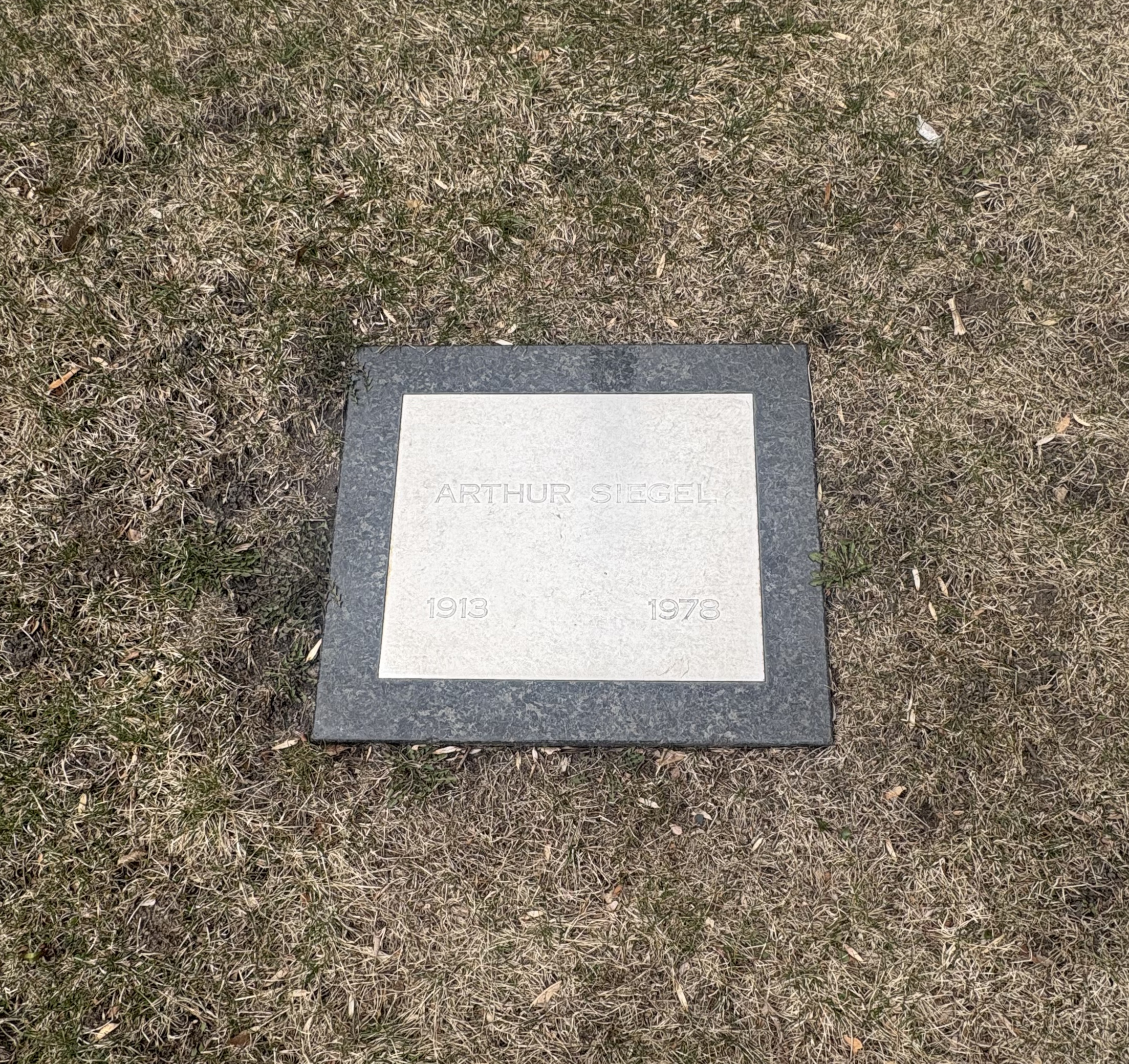
Siegel's grave at Graceland Cemetery

Siegel began photographing in the mid-1920s as a youth. He studied at University of Michigan, and graduated with a degree in sociology at Wayne State University in 1937 and then enrolled in the New Bauhaus at the Armour Institute. There he studied under the school's founder, László Moholy-Nagy, as well as György Kepes, until 1938, when he returned to Detroit. He then began working as a photojournalist for the New York Times, and took journalism assignments for newspapers, magazines, and government agencies for the next several decades. During World War II he photographed for the U.S. Army Air Corps and the Office of War Information.

After the war, he returned to the New Bauhaus (by then the IIT Institute of Design) as an instructor, at the request of Moholy-Nagy. He eventually became head of the school's photography department. He left in 1955 to work in photojournalism full-time, and returned in 1965; in 1971, he was named president of the IIT Institute of Design. In 1955, he married Irene Yarovich, an artist whom he met at IIT.

Siegel's photography was included in several major exhibitions at art galleries, including two shows devoted exclusively to Siegel at the Art Institute of Chicago and as part of the "Image of America" exhibit at the Museum of Modern Art. He was noted for his use of experimental color techniques, and from the 1950s often explored abstract use of color as a vehicle for expression. He worked with light in novel ways by "introduc[ing] creative methods of back-lighting and projecting light onto surfaces". He also wrote extensively on photography and influenced the development of photographic education programs.

Siegel died at his home in Chicago on February 1, 1978, and was buried at Graceland Cemetery.
