= Jacqueline Skiles =

American artist

- Born: 1937
- Known for: Printmaker and sculptor

Jacqueline Skiles (born 1937) is an American artist. She was a member of Women Artists in Revolution (WAR) and participated in the group's demand that the Whitney Museum include more women in its annual exhibitions. She also directed a graphics and silk-screen workshop at the Women's Interart Center.

Skiles was interviewed in 1971 by Doloris Holmes for the Smithsonian's Archives of American Art "Art World in Turmoil" oral history project. Her papers from 1963 through 1980 are in the Archives of American Art. Her image is included in the 1972 poster Some Living American Women Artists by Mary Beth Edelson. Her photos are in the collection of the International Center of Photography.
