= Daria Dorosh =

Ukrainian artist (born 1943)

Daria Dorosh (born 1943) is an artist, educator and activist. Born in Ukraine, she has lived and worked in New York City since 1950. She is among the co-founders, in 1972, of Artists in Residence (A.I.R. Gallery), the first all-female cooperative gallery in the United States. Dorosh's work was part of the inaugural exhibition at A.I.R. Dorosh studied art at the Cooper Union School of Art and Architecture and fashion at Fashion Institute of Technology.

Dorosh served on the faculty of Fashion Institute of Technology from 1969 to 2014 and has received numerous grants and awards for her work as an individual artist, including a National Endowment for the Arts Design Arts grant, a Delaware Valley Arts Alliance Individual Artists grant, and an ArtTable, 30th Anniversary Artist Honors Award.

Dorosh's early exhibitions included small watercolors. Her other works are intersections of art, fashion, and technology Dorosh examines cultural patterns that appear across disciplines. She creates work that questions "the relationship between a work of art, its viewer and the so-called real space in which both are 'confronted.'" Dorosh also uses digital prints in her work.

Her work is in the collection of the Smithsonian American Art Museum and the Whitney Museum of American Art. Dorosh’s work has been shown at the New York MoMA Museum of Modern Art, the Bronx Museum of the Arts, the NY Hall of Science, the San Jose Museum of Modern Art, the American Academy of Arts and Letters and in many galleries throughout the U.S. and overseas. Dorosh has produced work that speaks to the burgeoning genre ARQ [Arts Raising Questions], such as “Pangram Enters the Field of Questions” (2026) addressing debates on AI, <Decode> artists policing data (2018) exhibited in the Shiva Gallery at John Jay College of Criminal Justice, N.Y., Women on the Line (2016) exhibited at Studio 44, Stockholm, Sweden, Cooperative Consciousness (2016) exhibited in the Kochi-Muziris Biennale, India and If These Walls... (2014) exhibited on Governor’s Island, N.Y. She has used the visual arts for story-telling, e.g. Story Rugs (2009).

Her image is included in the iconic 1972 poster Some Living American Women Artists/ Last Supper by Mary Beth Edelson.
