= Irene Siegel =

American artist

- Born: Irene Yarovich; 1932 (age 93–94); Chicago, Illinois, U.S.
- Education: School of the Art Institute of Chicago, Tamarind Institute
- Alma mater: Northwestern University, University of Chicago, IIT Institute of Design
- Spouse: Arthur Siegel
- Children: 3

Irene Siegel (née Irene Yarovich; born 1932) is an American artist and educator.

== Early life and education ==
She was born in Chicago under the name Irene Yarovich to Russian immigrant parents. She grew up on the south side of Chicago, in Gage Park. She was an only child. At age 11, she was awarded a scholarship to take classes at the School of the Art Institute of Chicago.

In 1953, Siegel graduated from Northwestern University, and went on to study social science at the University of Chicago. Around that time, she became a Moholy-Nagy scholar at the Chicago Institute of Design (now IIT Institute of Design), where she earned her master's degree in 1956. In 1965 she married Arthur Siegel, whom she had met at IIT.

== Career ==
In 1967, Siegel was awarded a printmaking fellowship at Tamarind Institute. Her first solo art exhibition was in 1968 at the Lo Giudice Gallery in Chicago.

Siegel was a professor of art at the University of Illinois at Chicago, from 1970 until 1982.

In 1985, a four panel fresco she had been commissioned to create at the Conrad Sulzer Regional Library in Chicago, led to a community controversy over its content. The fresco depicted scenes from Virgil's Aeneid; however the neighborhood was concerned her depiction "implicitly endorsed graffiti", as well as other complaints.

Siegel's work is included in the collections of the Smithsonian American Art Museum, the Metropolitan Museum of Art, the Art Institute of Chicago, the Norton Simon Museum, and the Museum of Modern Art, New York.

Her image is included in the iconic 1972 poster Some Living American Women Artists by Mary Beth Edelson.
