= Fredi Marcarini =

Italian photographer (1959–2020)

Fredi Marcarini (born 1959 in Milan, Italy, died 2020) was an Italian photographer. He is known for his dramatic portrait photographs.

== Early life ==
The earliest document of Fredi Marcarini's interest in photography is a Super 8 home movie showing him at the age of 4 years old, pretending to shoot pictures with a non-existent camera and using his father's tripod. Later, when he was six, his father bought him a medium format camera with 6x6 film and early negatives from this period still exist, dating back to 1965, showing an early interest in landscape photography and portraits of his younger sister.

Marcarini began developing his own film and was printing from his own negatives by the age of 15. His education was accompanied by a succession of jobs including petrol station attendant, bartender, builder and waiter but also worked in a photo studio shooting still life, and later, whilst attending military service, as a crime scene photographer in the police force.

== Influences ==
Marcarini's greatest influences as a photographer were the works of Arthur Tress and Les Krims.

== Career ==
Marcarini taught himself photography through experimentation, and gradually started to put his work together into a portfolio, initially selling images to magazines and advertising agencies and eventually gaining commissions. After a decade spent as a food photographer in the 80s, he switched to portraiture, a field in which he found his real passion and developed his style. In the early 2000 he also started to take on work as a reportage photographer, producing several bodies of work from his travels in Africa, South America, Arctic and the Caribbean Islands. In 2009 Marcarini met the painter Jack Vettriano and together they have worked in several projects.

Marcarini's dramatic photographic style has been employed to capture images of many of Italy's most prominent personalities as well as global celebrities including Roger Moore, Pierce Brosnan, Philippe Starck, Sir Richard Branson, Jack Vettriano and Tracy Chevalier.
