= Joan Danziger =

American sculptor

- Born: 1934; New York City, U.S.
- Education: Cornell University; Art Students League; Accademia di Belle Arti di Roma
- Known for: Sculpture
- Website: joandanziger.com

Joan Danziger (born 1934) is an American sculptor. Her work is largely of large sculptures of beetles and hybrid human-animals.

== Early life and education ==
Danziger grew up in Queens, New York City. She graduated from Cornell University with a BFA, and studied at the Art Students League of New York, and the Accademia di Belle Arti di Roma in Rome.

== Career ==
Her work has been shown at the Morris Museum, Rutgers University, and the New Jersey State Museum. Her work is in: the New Orleans Museum of Art; the Smithsonian American Art Museum, the National Museum of Women in the Arts Reading Public Museum in Reading, Pennsylvania, Children's Museum of Pittsburgh in Pittsburgh, Susquehanna Art Museum, and the Glen Burnie District Courthouse in Maryland. She is known for her large sculptures of beetles and hybrid human-animal forms.

In 2026 the American University Museum held a retrospective of Danziger's work entitled The Magical World of Joan Danziger. The companion exhibition Ravens: Spirits of the Sky feature her glass and metal sculptures.

Her image is included in the 1972 poster Some Living American Women Artists by Mary Beth Edelson.

== Personal life ==
She resides and works in Washington, D.C.

== Reviews ==
- Elaine A. King (July–August 2009). "The Emblematic World of Joan Danziger". Sculpture Magazine.
