= Personnages Oiseaux =

Mural by Joan Miró

- Bird People (English)
- Artist: Joan Miró
- Year: 1978
- Type: Mural
- Dimensions: 8.53 m × 15.85 m (28 ft × 52 ft)
- Location: Ulrich Museum; Wichita

Personnages Oiseaux (English: Bird People) is one of Joan Miró's largest works in the United States and his only glass mosaic mural. It was created between 1972 and 1978.

== Description ==
Miró created it for Wichita State University's Edwin A. Ulrich Museum of Art, in Wichita, Kansas. The mural is one of Miró's largest two-dimensional projects, undertaken when he was 79 and completed when he was 85 years of age. Fabrication of the mural was completed in 1977, but Miró did not consider it finished until the installation was complete.

The glass mosaic was a first for Miró, and although he hoped to create others, he died before achieving this goal. Intending to come to the dedication of the mural in 1978, he fell at his studio in Palma (Majorca, Spain), and was unable to travel to the event. The entire south wall of the Ulrich Museum is the foundation for the 28 ft by 52 ft (8.53 m x 15.85 m) mural, composed of one million pieces of marble and Venetian glass mounted on specially treated wood, attached to the concrete wall on an aluminum grid. The work was a gift of the artist. Donor groups paid for its fabrication by Ateliers Loire of Chartres, France and for its installation. The Ulrich Museum also acquired the 5 ½ ft by 12 ft (1.7 m x 3.7 m ) oil on canvas maquette for the mural, but it has since been sold to establish a fund to support the museum's acquisitions and any repairs needed to the mural. The entire mural was originally assembled by an artisan at Ateliers Loire using Miró's maquette as a guide. Fabricated under Miró's personal direction and completed in 1977, the 80 panels comprising the mural were shipped to WSU, and the mural was installed on the Ulrich Museum's façade in 1978. The mural is a unique late work in the artist's career: one of Miró's largest two-dimensional works in North America and his only one in this medium.

== A six year conservation ==
In 2011 it was announced that the mural would be taken down. The mural, which had been losing tesserae, was the subject of a two-year study to work out how it could be conserved. The mural is to be taken apart and recreated with a stainless steel backing. The conservation was estimated to cost three million dollars. The mural was reinstalled at the Ulrich Museum of Art in 2016.
