= Dorothy Gillespie =

American artist and sculptor (1920–2012)

Dorothy M. Gillespie
- Dorothy Gillespie outside the Maryland Institute College of Art, ca. 1939
- Born: June 29, 1920; Roanoke, Virginia
- Died: September 30, 2012 (aged 92); Coral Gables, Florida
- Occupation: Artist
- Years active: 1938-2010
- Website: dorothygillespie.com

Dorothy Gillespie (1920–2012) was an American artist and sculptor who became known for her large and colorful abstract metal sculptures. She was artist in residence at the Women's Interart Center in New York City. A pioneer for women in the arts, she had a career spanning over 70 years as an activist, lecturer and mentor to creative women throughout the world. Working in such diverse mediums as metal, canvas and paper she distinguished herself as one of the preeminent artists of our time. Her work has been exhibited in prestigious museums such as the Guggenheim, as well as innovative private galleries and is collected by art lovers throughout the world.

Sometimes referred to as the “Wizard of Art,” her spectacular, colorful work conjures up images of rainbows, yellow brick roads and childhood pastimes. While living in Lima, Peru and Exeter, England, she explored an interest in archeology that had a profound impact on her sculpture creations. Long before “The Gates,” Dorothy Gillespie created a wonderland of “walk through triangles” in Central Park in the 1970s.

== Early and family life ==
Gillespie was born in Roanoke, Virginia, in 1920, the daughter of Earl V. Gillespie and his wife Lilian. She had a younger brother, Earl V. Gillespie Jr. (born circa 1925), and a younger sister, Lilian (b. circa 1933), and from her youth she showed an affinity for art. She graduated from Jefferson High School in Roanoke in 1937. She later attributed her vivid designs and bright colors to memories of a Christmas tree in Roanoke. Although her parents disagreed with her wish to pursue art as a career, she enrolled at the Maryland Institute College of Art (MICA) in Baltimore, Maryland. The director of the Maryland Institute, Hans Schuler, helped foster her career in fine art.

Gillespie married Bernard Israel in 1946, and they had three children before his death in 1992.

== Career ==
On June 5, 1943, aged 23, Gillespie moved to New York City. There she took a job at the B. Altman department store as assistant art director. She joined the Art Students League where she was exposed to new ideas about techniques, materials, and marketing, and also created works at Atelier 17 printmaking studio, where Stanley William Hayter encouraged her to experiment with her own ideas.

She and her husband opened a restaurant and night club in Greenwich Village called Salle de Champagne to support their family. She returned to making art in 1957, and worked at art full-time after they sold the nightclub in the 1970.

In 1977, Gillespie gave her first lecture series at the New School for Social Research, and she would give others there until 1982. She taught at her alma mater as a Visiting Artist (1981–1983) and gave Radford University some of her work to begin its permanent art collection. Gillespie then served as Woodrow Wilson visiting Fellow (1985–1994), visiting many small private colleges to give public lectures and teach young artists. She returned to Radford University to teach as Distinguished Professor of Art (1997–99). She also hosted a radio program, the Dorothy Gillespie Show on WHBI-FM in New York, from 1967 to 1973.

Gillespie began moving away from realism and into the abstraction that marked her career. Gillespie returned to New York City in 1963 to continue her career. She maintained a studio through the 70s and worked towards feminist goals in the art industry, picketing the Whitney Museum, helping to organize the Women's Interart Center, curating exhibitions of women's art, and writing articles raising awareness of her cause.

By the 1980s, Gillespie's work had come to be known internationally. She completed many commissions for sculptures in public places, including the Lincoln Center and Epcot Center in Orlando, Florida.

Gillespie also maintained a studio in Florida and served on the board of trustees of the Maitland Art Center in Maitland, Florida, from 1996 to 1999, and on the Broward County Cultural Affairs Council from 1993 to 1994.

Her work is unique in its use of ribbon-like shape and use of bright colors. Her sculptures are crafted out of aluminum covered in enamel. Her "Colorfall" is a 40-foot (12 m) tall sculpture hanging in the lobby of Wilmington's Thalian Hall Center for the Performing Arts.

== Notable Honors ==
- The Alice Baber Art Fund, Inc. Grant Award;
- Doctor of Pedagogy, Niagara University, Niagara Falls, NY 1990
- Doctor of Fine Arts (Honoris Causa) Caldwell College, Caldwell, NY 1976
- Allied Professions Award, Virginia Society
- The American Institute of Architects, Richmond, VA 1986
- Distinguished Alumni Award, Maryland Institute
- College of Art, Baltimore, MD 1983
- Outstanding Services Award, University of Arkansas at Little Rock, AR 1983
- Lifetime Achievement Award from the Women’s Caucus for Art in 2001
- The Gala 8 "Distinguished Woman" Award at Birmingham Southern College in 1987 which honors women who have made lasting contributions to our society in the fields of endeavor ranging from the arts, medicine, philanthropy, journalism, government, sports, entertainment and business.

== Notable Exhibits ==
Throughout her career, Gillespie had many notable exhibits. She has said that her 2003 exhibition at Rockefeller Center was her crowning achievement as she was given freedom to put art on the walls.

== Later Years ==
As she grew older, her eyesight began to fail and was unable to continue working on sculptures. Undeterred, she switched mediums and began drawing "ink on paper".

== Death and Legacy ==
Dorothy Gillespie died in Coral Gables, Florida, on September 30, 2012. In 2020, the Taubman Museum of Art organized and exhibition titled Celestial Centennial: The Art and Legacy of Dorothy Gillespie in honor of her centennial. Her papers are included in the Miriam Schapiro Archives on Women Artists at Special Collections and University Archives at Rutgers University.

== Foundation ==
The Dorothy M. Gillespie Foundation is a 501(c)(3) non-profit foundation and was created by Dorothy Gillespie herself as a way to continue to foster her legacy. The Foundation "Supports artists, initiatives, and institutions that embody the same innovative, inclusive multidisciplinary approach that Dorothy Gillespie exemplified in both her art and philanthropic endeavors".

The Dorothy M. Gillespie Foundation has continued to educate the public on Gillespie's life and work and continues to have exhibits to this day. The Foundation also gives grants to female artists to help continue to foster the legacy of Dorothy Gillespie.

In 2022, in partnership with the Boca Raton Museum of Art, the Boca Raton Innovation Campus (BRiC) began an initiative called "Art on BRiC Walls". BRiC installed 350 of Gillespie's aluminum starburst sculptures. This is a semi-permanent exhibit and is open to the public free of charge.

Beginning in October 2025 and running through March of 2026, the Cornell Art Museum in Delray Beach, FL, will exhibit her work including her renowned starbursts.
