= Nancy Grossman =

American visual artist (b. 1940)

- Born: April 28, 1940 (age 86); New York City, New York, United States
- Education: Pratt Institute (BFA)
- Known for: Sculpture
- Movement: Feminist Art
- Awards: Women's Caucus for Art Lifetime Achievement Award (2008)

Nancy Grossman (born April 28, 1940) is an American artist. Grossman is best known for her wood and leather sculptures of heads.

== Early life and education ==
Nancy Grossman was born in 1940 in New York City to Italian and Jewish parents who worked in the garment industry. Grossman's family struggled financially, and as the oldest of 5 children, she was often left responsible for raising her younger siblings while their parents worked. She moved at the age of five to Oneonta, New York. There, she began helping her parents at work making darts, which are three-dimensional folds sewn into fabric to give shape; and gussets, which are materials sewn into fabric to strengthen a garment. Her experience in sewing and leather-work influenced her work as an artist. Her rural home in Oneonta also allowed her the experience of riding horses, where she notes that harnesses and bridles, subjects that would show up later in her drawings and sculptures, fascinated her. The abuse she endured growing up, including responsibility for her siblings in early life, informed her later work.

Grossman studied at Pratt Institute and earned a Bachelor of Fine Arts degree, under the tutelage of David Smith and Richard Lindner, in 1962. To pay for her education, Grossman worked three jobs and utilized student federal loans, along with winning a drawing-based competitive scholarship. She then traveled Europe after earning Pratt's Ida C. Haskell Award for Foreign Travel, and a John Simon Guggenheim Foundation Fellowship (1965–66). In the beginning of her career in the arts she worked as a painter and a children's book illustrator.

When she began making art her work was largely collage and drawings. She was working in the 1960s, when Abstract Expression was popular, and she was torn between abstract art and her love for material exploration. At 23, Grossman had her first solo exhibition at the Kasner gallery in New York City. Her artwork included collages, constructions, drawings, and paintings. In 1964 she moved to Eldridge Street in Chinatown and continued to work there. Her move afforded her more space, so she began assembling free standingpieces and wall assemblages of at least six feet by four feet.

In 1972, Grossman signed the "We Have Had Abortions" campaign by Ms. magazine which called for an end to "archaic laws" limiting reproductive freedom, they encouraged women to share their stories and take action.

Her image is included in the iconic 1972 poster Some Living American Women Artists by Mary Beth Edelson.

Grossman relocated to Brooklyn in 1999 after being forced to leave her Chinatown studio which she had occupied for thirty-five years. Her work also struck out in new directions with a group of sculptural assemblages that seem to echo the archaeology and violence involved in the upheaval of her move.

Grossman was the life partner of art historian and critic Arlene Raven.

== Art ==
Grossman is probably most well known for her work with figures sculpted from soft wood and then covered in leather. Grossman first used wood, generally soft and "found," such as old telephone poles, and carefully sculpts heads and bodies. The leather in these pieces was also frequently salvaged, coming from items such as jackets, harnesses, and boots. The very first head that she created incorporated the use of black leather, epoxy, thread, wood, and metal. The original head quickly evolved into an ongoing series of roughly 100 heads, which is still being created in her Brooklyn studio to this day. The heads she sculpted early in her career were "blind" as the eyes were covered by leather; however, openings were always left for the noses. Grossman explains that she wanted to release some of the tension and let the figure breathe. Her attention to detail is seen in her workmanship, with each stitch of leather sewn carefully. The sculpture Male Figure (1971), is one of her full-bodied forms. Grossman uses leather, straps, zippers, and string to create sculptures that appear bound and restrained.

Beyond the heads, she is also recognized for her relief assemblage works of wood and leather. These utilize found leather of varying shades to create abstract shapes that suggest bodily forms, particularly genitals. The piece Bride (1967) is an example of these works. Grossman refers to these suggestive forms as unintentional, saying that her work comes from beneath conscious thought.

She describes her work as autobiographical, and despite works like Male Figure, which has male genitalia, she says her sculptures are self-portraits. Others have reviewed her work as seemingly sexual and reminiscent of sadism and masochism, which Grossman denies, describing how when the comparison was first demonstrated to her she had, "never heard of such a thing, never seen anything like that." She says her work challenges the ideas of gender identity and gender fluidity, and explores restriction: both self-imposed and societal. Grossman says the sculptures refer to her "bondage in childhood," but others have said that her work may flirt with the potential of female artists who had not yet gained prominence in the 1960s. "Grossman's paintings, collages, and sculpture come out of a distinctly individual understanding of the psychological reality of contemporary life." Head from 1968, in the collection of the Honolulu Museum of Art, is typical of the wood and leather sculptures of heads for which the artist is best known.

== Later work ==
Some of her later work, such as Black Lava Scape from her series Combustion Scapes (1994–95) are mixed media collages created from found objects. Another piece in the series Self-Contained Lavascape (1991) is a mixed media collage drawing. According to a review in the New York Times, these pieces were inspired by a helicopter flight over an active volcano in Hawaii.

In 1995, Grossman sustained an injury to her hand which made working with sculpture very difficult. After an operation to rebuild part of her hand, she was left with limited mobility, which is what led her to go back to her work with collage and painting.

Grossman's work has been shown in major museum exhibitions. In the summer of 2011, PS1-MoMA presented a solo exhibition of her sculptural heads, and in 2012, the Tang Museum at Skidmore College presented Nancy Grossman: Tough Life, a five-decade survey. Throughout her career, Grossman has received a steady flow of accolades, including a National Endowment for the Arts Fellowship (1984), a New York Foundation for the Arts Fellowship (1991), a Joan Mitchell Foundation Grant (1996–97), and a Pollock-Krasner Foundation Grant (2001), and her work is represented in the permanent collections of museums worldwide.

== Censorship ==
In 2009, the U.S. Postal Service censored her postcard, for her etchings of a book by Adrienne Rich.

== Exhibitions ==
- 1990 "Nancy Grossman: A Retrospective", Hillwood Art Museum, Brookville, New York
- 1995 "Nancy Grossman: Opus Volcanus", Hooks-Epstein Galleries
- 2000 "Nancy Grossman: Fire Fields", The Contemporary Museum at First Hawaiian Center
- 2001 "Nancy Grossman: Loud Whispers, Four Decades of Assemblage, Collages and Sculpture", Michael Rosenfeld Gallery, New York City, New York
- 2007 "Nancy Grossman: Drawings", Michael Rosenfeld Gallery, New York City, New York
- 2011 "Nancy Grossman: Combustion Scapes", Michael Rosenfeld Gallery, New York City, New York
- 2011 "Nancy Grossman: Heads", MoMA PS-1, New York City, New York
- 2012 "Nancy Grossman", Frances Young Tang Museum
- 2014 "Modern American Realism: The Sara Roby Foundation Collection", Smithsonian American Art Museum, Washington, D.C.

== Awards ==
- 1962: Ida C. Haskell Award for Foreign Travel, Pratt Institute, New York City, New York
- 1965-66: John Simon Guggenheim Foundation Fellowship
- 1966: Inaugural Contemporary Achievement Award, Pratt Institute, Brooklyn, New York City, New York
- 1970: One Hundred Women In Touch With Our Time, Harper's Bazaar Magazine
- 1973: Juror, New York State Council on the Arts, sculpture applicants for CAPS Fellowships
- 1974: Commencement Speaker and Honored Guest, 99th Commencement Exercises, Massachusetts College of Art, Boston, MA
- 1974: American Academy of Arts and Letters, National Institute of Arts and Letters Award
- 1974: Juror, American Academy in Rome, sculpture applicants for Prix de Rome Fellowships
- 1975: Elected to Membership, National Society of Literature and the Arts
- 1984: National Endowment for the Arts Fellowship in Sculpture
- 1990: The Hassam, Speicher, Betts and Symons Purchase Award, The American Academy and Institute of Arts and Letters
- 1991: Artist's Fellowship in Sculpture, The New York Foundation for the Arts
- 1991-92: Nancy Grossman at Exit Art, The Hillwood Art Museum and the Sculpture Center selected one of the three best exhibitions in an art gallery of this season by The American Chapter of the International Art Critics Association
- 1992: Elected into the National Academy of Design as an Associate member (became a full Academician in 1994).
- 1995: Alumnae Achievement Award, Pratt Institute, Brooklyn, New York City, New York
- 1996-97 Joan Mitchell Foundation Grant
- 2001: Pollock-Krasner Foundation Grant
- 2008: Women's Caucus for Art Lifetime Achievement Award.

== Bibliography ==
- Nancy Grossman: loud whispers: four decades of assemblage, collage and sculpture, Michael Rosenfeld Gallery, 2000, ISBN 978-1-930416-07-9
- Carol Kort; Liz Sonneborn (2002). A to Z of American women in the visual arts. Infobase Publishing. ISBN 978-0-8160-4397-2.
- Ian Berry, ed., Nancy Grossman: Tough Life Diary [retrospective] (Saratoga Springs, New York: Tang Teaching Museum at Skidmore College with Prestel USA, 2013).
- David J. Getsy, "Second Skins: The Unbound Genders of Nancy Grossman's Sculpture," in Abstract Bodies: Sixties Sculpture in the Expanded Field of Gender (New Haven and London: Yale University Press, 2015), 147–207.
