= Sylvia Stone =

Canadian Abstract sculptor

- Photo of Sylvia Stone
- Born: 1928; Toronto, Ontario
- Died: 2011
- Known for: Sculpture
- Movement: Abstract expressionism, Constructivism
- Spouse: Al Held

Sylvia Stone (1928 – September 5, 2011) was a Canadian sculptor. Her work is included in the collections of the Whitney Museum of American Art and the Smithsonian American Art Museum. She was a tenured professor at Brooklyn College and a notable Abstract artist at the New York School. She is best known for her large-scale sculptures made from Plexiglass.

== Early life ==
Stone was born in 1928 in Toronto, Ontario. She had two older sisters. When she was two years old, Stone, her siblings, and her mother left Stone's father. Her mother was unable to support her children on her own. Stone was subsequently sent to Children's Aid homes while her sisters were sent to help on local farms. At the age of six, Stone was placed back with her mother and sisters. The Great Depression severely impacted the family, and they were forced to move several times. It was during this time that Stone began to draw.

Stone was a gifted student and attended Central Tech, an arts high school in Toronto. During this period, she lived alone, as her sisters married and her mother moved out west. Her mother sent her rent money during this time, and after school Stone worked at Woolworth's. At the age of sixteen, Stone began supporting herself, working full-time on the night shift at a war plant, so that she could attend school during the day.

== Art career ==
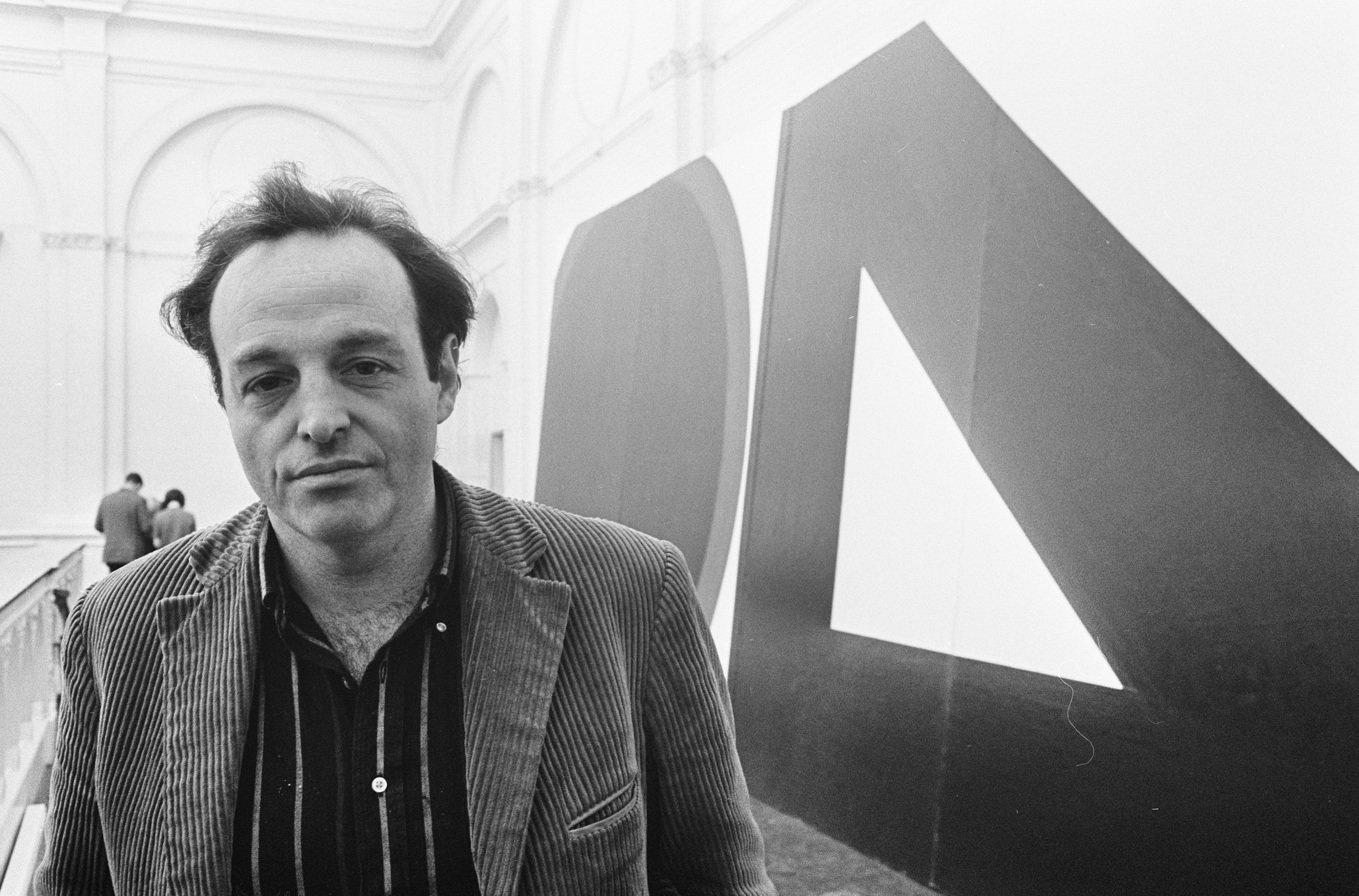
Stone's husband, Al Held, in front of a Hard-edge painting at the Stedelijk Museum Amsterdam in 1966.

In 1946, at the age of seventeen, Stone moved to New York. She briefly attended the Art Students League and worked as a photographer in a nightclub before marrying a man, whom she would later divorce. Stone had her first child at the age of twenty two, but continued to attend art classes part-time, to the disapproval of her husband's family. While at the Art Students League, she studied under Harry Sternberg, Morris Kantor, and Vaclav Vytlacil. She primarily painted in the 1950s, describing her work as moving from figurative and abstract landscapes to Hard-Edge paintings. In 1959, she first met painter Al Held, beginning a years long professional and romantic relationship. They were married in 1969. As the Abstract art movement developed in New York, she began experimenting with combining painting and sculpture, creating large Plexiglass sculptures and shaped paintings. Her work began to be recognized and shown more frequently, and she shared two studio spaces with Held, in Manhattan and Boiceville, New York. Her work is considered both Constructivist and Minimalist. It was also inspired by Cubism and Bauhaus.

In 1969, Stone, along with artists such as Andy Warhol, Alex Katz, and Claes Oldenburg, starred in the first Fashion Show Poetry Event, a series conceived of by poets Hannah Weiner, John Perreault, and Eduardo Costa and associated with the St. Mark's Poetry Project. Despite not having a graduate degree herself, Stone taught undergraduate and graduate art courses at Brooklyn College for several years. She began by substituting a small number of Ad Reinhardt's courses, before becoming an assistant and then full professor in the 1970s. Her image was included in the iconic 1972 poster Some Living American Women Artists by Mary Beth Edelson. In 1975, Stone was included in the exhibit "Two Hundred Years of American Sculpture" at the Whitney Museum. Her work was shown by Andre Emmerich in the late 1970s and early 1980s.

Stone and Held divorced in 1986. Stone died from an illness on September 5, 2011.
