= A Donkey, 3 Rocks, and a Bird. =

Sculpture in West Haven-Sylvan, Oregon, U.S.

- The sculpture in 2021
- Artist: Brad Rude
- Year: 1992
- Type: Sculpture
- Medium: Polychromed cast bronze, stone
- Subject: Donkey, bird
- Dimensions: 17 m × 33 m × 6.1 m (55 ft × 108 ft × 20 ft)
- Condition: "Well maintained" (1993)
- Location: West Haven-Sylvan, Oregon, United States
- 45°30′43.2″N 122°45′58.3″W

A Donkey, 3 Rocks, and a Bird., also known as Donkey, Bird and Rocks and Donkey, Three Rocks, and a Bird, is an outdoor 1992 sculpture by Brad Rude, installed at Catlin Gabel School in West Haven-Sylvan, a census-designated place in Washington County and the Portland metropolitan area, in the U.S. state of Oregon.

== Description and history ==
Brad Rude's A Donkey, 3 Rocks, and a Bird. (1992), installed at Catlin Gabel School between the Lower School's science room and the Art Barn, is a cast bronze and stone sculpture depicting a life-size donkey and a bird facing one another. The donkey has a rock balanced on its back, while the bird is both standing on a rock and balancing one on its head. The donkey has surfaces decorations, including glyphs and figures, and is coated in polychrome bronze. The bird is coated in blue, green, orange, red and yellow. The sculpture measures approximately 55 inches (1.4 m) x 108 inches (2.7 m) x 20 inches (0.51 m). Its base is made of exposed aggregate concrete and measures approximately 10 inches (0.25 m) x 108 inches (2.7 m) x 20 inches (0.51 m). One plaque on the base reads, "A DONKEY / 3 ROCKS, / AND A BIRD." / BY BRAD RUDE '92. Another reads, Donkey, Bird and Rocks / by Brad Rude / Cast Bronze / a gift from / Dori Schnitzer '71 and Susan Schnitzer '74 / A CAMPAIGN FOR CATLIN GABEL / Breaking Ground for the 21st Century / September 1992. Inscriptions near the donkey's crotch displays the artist's last name, a copyright symbol, and the year of completion, plus the founder's mark for Will Willie. The Smithsonian Institution describes the work as abstract. Its condition was deemed "well maintained" by Smithsonian's "Save Outdoor Sculpture!" program in November 1993.

== See also ==
- 1992 in art
- Elkhorn (sculpture), a 1979 sculpture by Lee Kelly installed at Catlin Gabel
