= Ulrich Museum =

Art museum in Wichita, Kansas

Ulrich Museum of Art

- Personnages Oiseaux outside the Ulrich Museum in 2026
- Established: 1974
- Location: 1845 Fairmount Street; Wichita, Kansas 67260
- Coordinates: 37.7170568°N 97.3152619°W
- Type: Art museum, sculpture garden, & university museum
- Accreditation: American Alliance of Museums
- Key holdings: Personnages Oiseaux by Joan Miró
- Collections: Bush Outdoor Sculpture Collection
- Founders: Clark Ahlberg & Edwin A. Ulrich
- Executive & Creative Director: Vivian Zavataro
- Architect: Charles F. McAfee
- Owner: Wichita State University
- Website: ulrich.wichita.edu

The Edwin A. Ulrich Museum of Art is a modern and contemporary art museum located on the campus of Wichita State University in Wichita, Kansas.

== History ==
The museum opened on December 7, 1974 in McKnight Art Center, where it is still located today. The building was designed by architect Charles F. McAfee.

It is best known for the large Venetian glass and marble mosaic by Joan Miró found on the facade of the building, titled Personnages Oiseaux, a 28-by-52-foot (8.5 by 15.8 m) mural on 80 panels. It is also well known for the large Martin H. Bush Outdoor Sculpture Collection of 80 works across 330 acres, which was named Top Ten among campus sculptures in 2006 by Public Art Review. The sculpture collection includes works by Fernando Botero, Andy Goldsworthy, Lila Katzen, Joan Miró, Claes Oldenburg, Tom Otterness, Auguste Rodin, Sophia Vari, Elyn Zimmerman, and Francisco Zuniga. The Outdoor Sculpture Collection is part of the museum's permanent collection, which contains approximately 6,500 objects.

The museum's permanent collection of over 7,000 works includes works by Benny Andrews, Diane Arbus, Barkley Hendricks, Nan Goldin, Zhang Huan, Sol LeWitt, Joan Mitchell, Gordon Parks, Kara Walker, and Andy Warhol, among many others. The collection also contains large groups of works by a number of artists, including Lee Adler, Minna Wright Citron, Gordon Parks, Marian Stephenson Patmore, and Harry Sternberg.

== Personnages Oiseaux ==
Personnages Oiseaux (Bird People) is a mural by Joan Miró, made up of thousands of glass and marble tesserae, which was first painted by Miró, and converted into a mosaic mural by Ateliers Loire in Chartres, France. This mural was Miró's only mural made of glass and marble, and one of the eleven he made during his lifetime. It was featured on the southern-facing wall from 1978 to 2011, when it was removed for repairs. The mural was losing between 300 and 400 tiles yearly, and the full cost of the repairs came out at $2.2 million; the mural returned in 2016.

== See also ==
- Lowell D. Holmes Museum of Anthropology
- List of museums in Kansas
