= Ideals (sculpture) =

Sculpture in Portland, Oregon

- The sculpture in 2015
- Artist: Muriel Castanis
- Year: 1992
- Type: Sculpture
- Medium: Bronze with green petina
- Dimensions: 1.8 m × 0.84 m × 1.1 m (6 ft × 2.75 ft × 3.5 ft); 1.8 m diameter (6 ft)
- Condition: "Well maintained" (1993)
- Location: Portland, Oregon, United States; 45°31′40″N 122°39′30″W

Ideals is a 1992 outdoor bronze sculpture by Muriel Castanis, installed outside the Portland State Office Building in northeast Portland, Oregon, United States.

== Description and history ==
Ideals was commissioned in 1991 as part of the One Percent for Art in State Buildings Collection. Castanis completed the work in February 1992, and it was installed at the northwest exterior corner of the Portland State Office Building (800 Northeast Oregon Street) in the Lloyd District. The sculpture is bronze with a green patina and measures approximately 6 ft × 2.75 ft × 3.5 ft (1.83 m × 0.84 m × 1.07 m). It rests on an aggregate base approximately 6 ft (1.8 m) in diameter, and weighs 850 lb (390 kg). The Smithsonian Institution categorizes the work as abstract and allegorical ("hope"), and describes it as a "standing female-like figure in the form of a hooded drapery garment with no visible figure inside". The Public Art Archive describes the sculpture as an "illusion of a human female form, defined by the draping and gathering of cloth rather than the positive space of the form herself". The figure's proper left arm is raised, and four footlights set into the base illuminate it. The Smithsonian's "Save Outdoor Sculpture!" program surveyed the sculpture in 1993 and deemed it "well maintained". Ideals is administered by the Oregon Arts Commission.

== See also ==
- 1992 in art
