= Jack Vettriano =

Scottish painter (1951–2025)

Jack Vettriano OBE
- The Singing Butler
- Born: Jack Hoggan; 17 November 1951; Methil, Fife, Scotland
- Died: 1 March 2025 (aged 73); Nice, France
- Education: Self-taught
- Known for: Painting
- Notable work: Poppy Fields (1973); The Singing Butler (1992); A Voyage of Discovery (1992); The Innocents (1993); Bad Boy, Good Girl (1994); After The Thrill Is Gone (1994); And So to Bed (1996); The Longing (1997); Dance Me to the End of Love (1998); Suddenly One Summer (2000)
- Movement: Contemporary

Jack Vettriano (/ˌvɛtr.iˈɑːnoʊ/; born Jack Hoggan, 17 November 1951 – 1 March 2025) was a Scottish painter, known for his distinctive figurative style, often depicting scenes of romance, mystery, and nostalgia. Largely self-taught, Vettriano gained international recognition with his 1992 painting The Singing Butler, which became one of the best-selling art prints in the UK.

His works, characterized by cinematic composition and atmospheric lighting, frequently depict elegantly dressed figures in ambiguous or intimate settings. Despite achieving commercial success, Vettriano's work has been met with mixed critical reception, with some art critics dismissing it as overly sentimental or populist. Nevertheless, he has remained a highly popular artist, with his paintings commanding significant prices at auction.

Vettriano exhibited in prestigious venues, including the Royal Academy of Arts in London, and was honoured for his contributions to the arts. His influence extends beyond painting, with his artwork featured in books, film and popular culture.

== Early life ==
Hoggan was born on 17 November 1951 in the industrial seaside town of Methil, Fife, where he also grew up. He was raised in poverty; he lived with his mother, father and older brother in a spartan miner's house, sharing a bed with his brother and wearing hand-me-down clothes. From the age of 10, his father sent him out delivering papers and milk, cleaning windows and picking potatoes; any job that would earn money. His father took half his earnings.

Hoggan left school at 15 and later became an apprentice mining engineer. For a short time in the late 1960s, he had a summer job as a bingo caller at the Beachcomber Amusements on Leven Promenade. He took up painting as a hobby in the 1970s, when a girlfriend bought him a set of watercolours for his 21st birthday. His earliest paintings, under his birth name Jack Hoggan, were copies or pastiches of impressionist paintings; his first painting was a copy of Claude Monet's The Poppy Field near Argenteuil. Much of his influence came from studying paintings at the Kirkcaldy Museum and Art Gallery. In 1984, Hoggan first submitted his work to the Shell-sponsored art exhibition in the museum.

In 1987, when he was 36, Hoggan left his wife Gail, seeking to emulate Paul Gauguin. He quit his job in educational research and moved to Edinburgh where he adopted his mother's maiden name Vettriano. He applied to study Fine Art at the University of Edinburgh, but his portfolio was rejected.

== Career ==
In 1988, Vettriano submitted two canvases for the Royal Scottish Academy annual show. Both paintings sold on the first day and Vettriano was approached by several galleries. Further exhibitions followed in Edinburgh, London, Hong Kong and Johannesburg. In November 1999, Vettriano's work was shown for the first time in New York City, when 21 paintings were displayed at The International 20th Century Arts Fair at The Armory. More than 40 collectors from the UK flew out for the event and 20 paintings were sold on the opening night.

In 1996 Terence Conran commissioned Vettriano to create a series of paintings for his new Bluebird Gastrodome in London. The seven paintings, inspired by the life of Malcolm Campbell, hung there for 10 years. Heartbreak Publishing, Vettriano's own publishing company, produced a boxed set featuring signed, limited-edition prints of all seven paintings to mark the 75th anniversary of Campbell's final World Land Speed Record. The Bluebird paintings were auctioned by Sotheby's at the Gleneagles Hotel in Perthshire on 30 August 2007 and made more than £1 million in all: the most expensive was Bluebird at Bonneville, bought for £468,000.

=== Prices and values ===
His easel paintings cost between £48,000 and £195,000 new. According to The Guardian he earned £500,000 a year in print royalties. Vettriano's 1992 painting, The Singing Butler, has been the best-selling image in Britain. On 21 April 2004, the original canvas of The Singing Butler sold at auction for £744,500. It had been rejected in 1992 by the Royal Academy summer exhibition. The composition for the painting, as discovered by Scottish designer Sandy Robb, had been sourced from the Illustrator's Figure Reference Manual.

In April 2010, seven out of ten paintings by Vettriano failed to sell at Sotheby's spring auction of Scottish pictures. Those that sold did so for half their previous prices. Art experts suggested that the monetary value of Vettriano's works needed reassessing.

== Studios and publishing ==
Vettriano had studios in Scotland and London. He was represented by the Portland Gallery, London, from 1993 to 2007, and counted Jack Nicholson, Alex Ferguson, Tim Rice and Robbie Coltrane amongst his collectors. To date, five books have been published about Vettriano, the most recent of which, Studio Life, was published in March 2008. In February 2009, Vettriano launched Heartbreak Publishing and his own London gallery, also called Heartbreak, which exclusively represents him, and also promotes younger artists.

In March 2010, Days of Wine And Roses was opened by Scottish First Minister Alex Salmond at the Kirkcaldy Museum. The exhibition then transferred to Vettriano's gallery in London.

== Personal life ==
Divorced from his first wife, Vettriano divided his time between homes in London, Kirkcaldy and Nice, France. In Kirkcaldy he lived in the boardroom section of the former Nairn linoleum factory, now converted into residential use.

He claimed he had drawn inspiration for his paintings from "25 years of sexual misbehaviour". In 2010, he told The Independent: "I live in a world of heartbreak ... I just seem to be more creative when I'm in some kind of emotional distress", adding "It's been four years of soul-searching – nicotine, alcohol, anti-depressants, temazepam".

In 2010, Vettriano said about relationships, "Whenever someone stays for longer than two days, I get cabin fever", and that he loves shoe-shopping with women.

He liked to gamble on horses, but only bet what he could afford to lose. He set up the Vettriano Trust, and planned to leave his money to it to do good work.

In February 2012, Vettriano was convicted at Kirkcaldy Sheriff Court of drunk-driving and possession of amphetamine. He was banned from driving for 18 months and fined £800. When stopped he told the police officer "You know who I am. We can sort this out."

In 2022, he announced that he had two significantly younger East European muses who had helped him overcome cocaine and alcohol addiction and inspired him to paint again. One worked as a waitress in an Edinburgh bistro, and he met the other at a sale in Nice. He explained to The Daily Telegraph:

I can't go on dating sites. I can't go clubbing. I can hardly bloody walk, never mind dance. So the opportunities to meet the opposite sex are really dwindling. But it goes a long way to say "oh, and by the way, look at my website". They see it's not just Joe Ordinary, which almost definitely helps.

=== Death ===
On 1 March 2025, Vettriano was found dead at his apartment in Nice. He was 73. His death was announced by his publicist two days later, on 3 March. Whilst the exact cause was unconfirmed, local media reported that there were no suspicious circumstances surrounding his death.

== Commissions ==
In January 2012, menswear brand Stefano Ricci launched its Spring Summer 2012 collection with a campaign inspired by the work of Jack Vettriano. The SS 2012 catalogue, entitled Stefano Ricci – a tribute to Vettriano, featured images by Vettriano and photographic re-interpretations shot by Fredi Marcarini featuring clothes and accessories from the Ricci 2012 collection. A short film about the 2012 Vettriano campaign commemorated the collaboration.

In 2017, he was one of three artists commissioned to paint portraits of Scottish comedian Billy Connolly to celebrate Connolly's 75th birthday. These were then put on display in Glasgow's People's Gallery, while the images were transferred to murals in the centre of Glasgow. Vettriano's mural is located in Dixon Street, off St Enoch Square. It was the subject of a BBC Scotland documentary first broadcast on 14 June 2017.

In 2018, Worthing's "Room with a View" gallery showcased 30 Vettriano paintings. Art dealer Jane Hill stated that Vettriano is "self-taught which I admire immensely. He has really pulled himself up from the depth of nowhere."

== Artistic style ==
Vettriano was a self-taught artist in drawing and perspective, who manipulated paint in veiled glazes and meaningful shadows. Vettriano's style has been compared to those of Edward Hopper and Walter Sickert, and his scudded beaches to those of Eugène Boudin. In many of his paintings, there is a hidden narrative, in enigmatic compositions, a starting point for dozens of short stories.

== Criticism ==
According to The Daily Telegraph he has been described as the Jeffrey Archer of the art world, a purveyor of "badly conceived soft porn", and a painter of "dim erotica". According to Vanity Fair, critics say Jack Vettriano paints brainless erotica. Sandy Moffat, head of drawing and painting at Glasgow School of Art, said: "He can't paint, he just colours in." The Guardian's art critic, Jonathan Jones, described Vettriano's paintings as a group as "brainless" and said Vettriano "is not even an artist." Richard Calvocoressi, at the time director of the Scottish National Gallery of Modern Art, said: "I'd be more than happy to say that we think him an indifferent painter and that he is very low down our list of priorities (whether or not we can afford his work, which at the moment we obviously can't). His 'popularity' rests on cheap commercial reproductions of his paintings."

In 2004, in the Sunday Times, the art critic Waldemar Januszczak responded to complaints by Vettriano that his work was not being collected by British museums:

The national collections do not buy Vettriano’s work because it is meretricious rubbish. It may have a role to play on the walls of a cocktail bar with pretensions, but its intrinsic shallowness, its magazine slickness, the unsightly coyness of its eroticism, the absurd melodrama of its moods, the banality of its imaginative flourishes, the creepiness of its world-view, the facelessness of its finish, all these shortcomings disqualify it from serious consideration by a national collection. The state has no duty to buy it, any more than it has a duty to buy Tretchikoff’s Green Lady, or that popular poster of a female tennis player scratching her naked bum, or the three flying ducks. As Dryden once opined on the issue of popular taste:'The most may err as grossly as the few.'

In 2013 in The Guardian, art critic Jonathan Jones wrote: "Vettriano fixes on fetishistic, stylish objects and paints them with a slick, empty panache" and "The world of Jack Vettriano is a crass male fantasy that might have come straight out of Money by Martin Amis".

In The Scotsman, George Kerevan wrote "He suffers all the same criticisms of the early French Impressionists: mere wallpaper, too simplistic in execution and subject, too obviously erotic." Alice Jones wrote in The Independent that Vettriano has been labelled a chauvinist whose "women are sexual objects, frequently half naked and vulnerable, always in stockings and stilettos." Regarding the criticism, sculptor David Mach has said: "If he was a fashion designer Jack would be right up there. It's all just art world snobbery. Anyway, who cares, he probably makes more money than Damien Hirst anyway."

In October 2005, after the original of The Singing Butler sold for £740,000, it came to light that Vettriano had used the artists' reference manual The Illustrator's Figure Reference Manual to form his figures, using Irish actress Orla Brady for the 'lady in red.' In 2025, a Banksy interpretation of the work sold for £4.3 million several days after Vettriano's death. The work, titled Crude Oil (Vettriano), which was previously owned by Blink 182 bassist Mark Hoppus, was sold by Sotheby's in London to a private collector.

== Collaborations ==
Alongside fellow Fifer, author Ian Rankin, Vettriano put in a cameo appearance in a video with Scottish indie band Saint Jude's Infirmary made for BBC Scotland's The Music Show. The video was filmed on Portobello Beach in Edinburgh and included visual references to two of Vettriano's most famous paintings, Elegy for a Dead Admiral and The Singing Butler. The lyrics of the track Goodbye Jack Vettriano were written by band member Grant Campbell after seeing a Vettriano print on a pub wall in Rotterdam. Vettriano became a fan of the band after hearing their first album, Happy Healthy Lucky Month, and was inspired to create a painting which featured as the cover of the band's second album, for which both Vettriano and Rankin contributed spoken word pieces.

In May 2008, Vettriano collaborated with Jackie Stewart, on a triptych of paintings entitled Tension, Timing, Triumph – Monaco 1971. The paintings were unveiled by Prince Albert of Monaco at a private reception at the Hôtel de Paris in Monaco on 21 May 2008. The originals hang in Stewart's private collection in the UK and the images have been published as a limited-edition print.

Following on from the previous year's event in Monaco, Vettriano was invited to create a series of paintings to celebrate the centenary of Tuiga, the Yacht Club de Monaco's flagship yacht, which was built on the Clyde. The paintings were first shown in an exhibition, Homage à Tuiga, in Monaco and were part of a touring exhibition that opened at the Kirkcaldy Museum in Fife in March 2010.

Vettriano worked with the Italian photographer Fredi Marcarini, both on a series of photographs for the Homage à Tuiga exhibition and on a triptych of portrait shots. In May 2011, Vettriano collaborated on the exhibition The Ballroom Spy with the photographer Jeanette Jones.

In collaboration with fellow Fife native Stephen Anderson of Commercial Spirits, Vettriano launched Jack Vettriano Gin, a spirit product featuring four of Jack's paintings: The Singing Butler, Billy Boys, Along Came A Spider and A Kind of Loving. The brand was launched at the Forth Floor Bar & Restaurant in collaboration with Louise Masson, GM of Harvey Nichols, Edinburgh with an auction of four signed giclées raising over £7000 for charity.

== Philanthropy ==
In 2004, Vettriano set up a scholarship for University of St Andrews to fund a student who would not otherwise be able to attend university. The scholarship is awarded every four years. The endowment follows his financial contribution towards refurbishing the Students Association's Old Union Coffee Bar in 2002 and his involvement in student fashion shows. He was made a Doctor of Letters by the university.

Vettriano donated several works of art to be sold in aid of charities, including the Terrence Higgins Trust. In September 2001, Vettriano donated a painting, Beautiful Dreamer, to a charity auction, which was held at Sotheby's in aid of Help the Hospices. In 2008, a drawing he made of that subject sold at a charity auction in aid of the Oriel Plas Glyn-y-Weddw Gallery in Llanbedrog, North Wales in July, helping to keep the gallery open.

Vettriano donated a portrait of Zara Phillips, entitled Olympia, to Sport Relief in 2008. The painting went to a charity fund-raising auction, selling at Bonhams for £36,000. In 2010, Vettriano created a postcard – alongside names such as Tracey Emin and Florence Welch – as part of a British Airways campaign for Sport Relief.

Also in 2010, Vettriano helped to raise money for the conservation movement Elephant Family by participating in an auction of donated elephant sculptures and models. Vettriano's elephant, The Singing Butler Rides Again, was the highest bid-for lot, selling for £155,000. Vettriano was also asked by First Minister Alex Salmond to create his official Christmas card Let's Twist Again. The original painting and limited-edition prints later sold at auction for the benefit of four Scottish charities, raising £86,000.

== Awards and honours ==
In June 2003, the University of St Andrews awarded Vettriano an honorary Doctor of Letters. A University spokesperson said, “It is a privilege for the University to honour one of Scotland’s leading contemporary artists, and a particular pleasure to do so because of the amount of time which Jack Vettriano has invested in helping the University’s students fulfil some of their own artistic aspirations.”

Vettriano was appointed Officer of the Order of the British Empire (OBE) in the 2003 Birthday Honours for services to the visual arts. He received his honour during a ceremony at Buckingham Palace on Thursday 27 November 2003.

In 2004, the Open University awarded Vettriano with an honorary degree, Doctor of the University, at a graduation ceremony in Ely, Cambridgeshire.

On 24 March 2010, Jackie Stewart presented Vettriano with the Great Scot of the Year award. The award ceremony was held at the Boisdale Club in London. The award led MSP Ted Brocklebank to file a motion in parliament calling for Vettriano's contribution to Scottish culture to be recognised.

In February 2011, it was announced that Vettriano's self-portrait The Weight would be displayed at the re-opened Scottish National Portrait Gallery from November 2011, the first time he had exhibited at a national gallery. Deputy director Nicola Kalinsky said Vettriano was "a figure we have wanted on our wall for a while for obvious reasons". First Minister Alex Salmond said of Vettriano, "He is a wonderful artist of considerable talent and achievement and this is a magnificent tribute to the special place he holds in the hearts of people in Scotland."

In May 2011, "The Ballroom Spy" exhibition opened at Vettriano's gallery; Heartbreak a new exhibition by Vettriano in collaboration with the photographer Jeanette Jones was also scheduled. In July 2011, the exhibition transferred to the Royal West of England Academy in Bristol, which was viewed as a controversial choice by many.

In February 2012, Vettriano's most famous painting, The Singing Butler, went on display at the Aberdeen Art Gallery as part of an exhibition entitled From Van Gogh to Vettriano.

In September 2013, a major exhibition, Jack Vettriano: A Retrospective, opened at Glasgow's Kelvingrove Art Gallery and Museum. It featured over 100 works and ran until 23 February 2014.

In 2015, a private collection of 12 works by Vettriano raised a total of £837,900 at an auction in Edinburgh.

== Books ==
- Fallen Angels, edited by W. Gordon Smith, Pavilion Books, October 1999 (ISBN 978-1-86205-364-9).
- Lovers and Other Strangers, text by Anthony Quinn, Pavilion Books on 30 October 2003 (ISBN 978-1-86205-630-5).
- Jack Vettriano: A Life, text by Anthony Quinn, Pavilion Books on 25 October 2004 (ISBN 978-1-86205-646-6). (A reduced format version was published in 2007.)
- Studio Life, foreword by Ian Rankin, photographs by Jillian Edelstein, text by Tom Rawstorne, Pavilion Books on 28 March 2008 (ISBN 978-1-86205-743-2).
- Women in Love, Pavilion Books on 5 May 2009 (ISBN 978-1-86205-855-2).
- A Man's World, Pavilion Books on 5 May 2009 (ISBN 978-1-86205-856-9).

== See also ==
- What Do Artists Do All Day?
