= Some Living American Women Artists (collage) =

1972 collage by Mary Beth Edelson

- Artist: Mary Beth Edelson
- Year: 1972
- Medium: Cut-and-pasted gelatin silver prints with crayon and transfer type on printed paper with typewriting on cut-and-taped paper
- Dimensions: 71.8 cm × 109.2 cm (28 1/4 in × 43 in)
- Location: Museum of Modern Art

Some Living American Women Artists, also referred to as Some Living American Women Artists/Last Supper, is a collage by the American artist Mary Beth Edelson created during the second wave feminist movement. The central portion is an image based on Leonardo da Vinci's 15th-century mural The Last Supper. Edelson replaced the faces of Christ's disciples with cut-out photographs of American women artists. She surrounded the central image with additional photographs of American women artists. The work is in the collection of the Museum of Modern Art.

Edelson intended the collage to "identify and commemorate women artists, who were getting little recognition at the time, by presenting them as the grand subject—while spoofing the patriarchy for cutting women out of positions of power and authority."

A lithograph edition of 50 prints was subsequently created. A numbered print is in the collection of the Smithsonian American Art Museum.

== Artists included in the central portion ==
- Lynda Benglis
- Helen Frankenthaler
- June Wayne
- Alma Thomas
- Lee Krasner
- Nancy Graves
- Georgia O'Keeffe (photograph replacing the image of Christ)
- Elaine de Kooning
- Louise Nevelson
- M. C. Richards
- Louise Bourgeois
- Lila Katzen
- Yoko Ono

== Artists included in the surrounding border ==
Photographs of artists in the border are numbered, with a key at the bottom. There is an image numbered "3", but it is not included in the key. Number "43" is neither in the border nor in the key.

1. Agnes Martin
2. Joan Mitchell
3. unidentified
4. Grace Hartigan
5. Yayoi Kusama
6. Marisol
7. Alice Neel
8. Jane Wilson
9. Judy Chicago
10. Gladys Nilson [sic]
11. Betty Parsons
12. Miriam Shapiro [sic]
13. Lee Bonticou [sic]
14. Sylvia Stone
15. Chryssa
16. Sue Ellen Rocca [sic]
17. Carolee Schneeman [sic]
18. Lisette Model
19. Audrey Flack
20. Buffie Johnson
21. Vera Simmons [sic]
22. Helen Pashgian
23. Susan Lewis Williams
24. Racelle Strick
25. Ann McCoy
26. Jennie Lea Knight
27. Enid Sanford
28. Joan Balou
29. Marta Minujín
30. Rosemary Wright
31. Cynthia Bickley
32. Lawra Gregory
33. Agnes Denes
34. Mary Beth Edelson
35. Irene Siegel
36. Nancy Grossman
37. Hannah Wilke
38. Jennifer Bartlett
39. Mary Corse
40. Eleanor Antin
41. Jane Kaufman
42. Muriel Castanis
43. not in collage or key
44. Susan Crile
45. Anne Ryan
46. Sue Ann Childress
47. Patricia Mainardi
48. Dindga McCannon
49. Alice Shaddle
50. Arden Scott
51. Faith Rionggold [sic]
52. Sharon Brant
53. Daria Dorosh
54. Nina Yankowitz
55. Rachel bas-Cohain
56. Loretta Dunkelman
57. Kay Brown
58. CeRoser
59. Noma Copley
60. Martha Edelheit
61. Jackie Skyles
62. Barbara Zuker [sic]
63. Susan Williams
64. Judith Bernstein
65. Rosemary Mayer
66. Maud Boltz [sic]
67. Patsy Norvell
68. Joan Danziger
69. Minna Citron
