= Myrna Lamb =

American dramatist (1930–2017)

- Born: August 3, 1930; Newark, New Jersey, U.S.
- Died: September 15, 2017 (aged 87); Point Pleasant Beach, New Jersey, U.S.
- Education: The New School; Rutgers University
- Occupation: Playwright

Myrna Lila Lamb (August 3, 1930, Newark, New Jersey – September 15, 2017, Point Pleasant Beach, New Jersey) was an American playwright.

== Career ==
Myrna Lamb graduated from The New School and Rutgers University. Anselma dell'Olio, film critic and director, selected her work for a feminist Theater production at the Martinique Theater in May 1969. Several of her works were produced by the Women's Interart Theatre in New York City, which had started around 1969. This theatre showcased work by women playwrights and directors.

Myrna Lamb died of heart disease on September 15, 2017, aged 87.

== Awards ==
- 1971 Biennale de Paris production grant
- 1973 Rockefeller Fellowship residency grant for New York Shakespeare Festival
- 1973 Guggenheim Fellowship
- 1974, 1975 National Endowment for the Arts Music Program grant
- 1977 New York Shakespeare Festival grant (Playwrights on Payroll)

== Works ==
- Apple Pie, 1976, New York Shakespeare Festival, New York City
- Ballad Of Brooklyn, 1979, Brooklyn Academy of Music, New York
- But What Have You Done for Me Lately, Washington Square Church, NYC 1968
- The Butcher Shop, Oberlin College, OH
- The Comeback Act, Interart Theatre, NYC
- Crab Quadrille, Interart Theatre, NYC, 1976
- I Lost A Pair Of Gloves Yesterday, Manhattan Theatre Club, NY
- In The Shadow of The Crematoria, Martinique Theatre, NYC
- Jillila
- Mod Donna, 1970, New York Shakespeare Festival, New York City
- Monologia:The Mod Donna and Scylon Z, Interart Theatre, NYC 1971
- Mother Ann
- Olympic Park, New York Shakespeare Festival, NYC (reading)
- Pas de Deux, Oberlin College, OH
- The Sacrifice, AMDA Theatre, NYC
- The Serving-Girl and the Lady, Martinique Theatre, NYC
- Two Party System

=== Screenplays ===
- Balloon
- Blood Alley
- Dead Center
- Point Pleasant America
- Treatments for King of the Blitz
