= Susan Williams (artist) =

American artist

- Born: Susan Lewis; 1938; Chicago
- Died: 2015 (aged 76–77)

Susan Williams was an American artist. In 1938 she was born Susan Lewis in Chicago, Illinois. She married architect Frank Williams in the 1960s and had her son David in 1969. She was a fraternal twin (Sandy, her sister was an animal rights activist). Williams got her MFA at New York University, where she initially studied painting, but then moved into three dimensional work. Her time was divided between San Miguel Allende in Mexico where she maintained a home and studio and Craryville, in upstate New York. In 2015, she died of cancer at home in Craryville with her son at her side; her husband, son, and three grandchildren (Anabelle, Dakota, Juliette) survived her.

Williams was an AIR Gallery pioneer and co-founding member. She formed the gallery in 1972 with friend Barbara Zucker in order to increase the promotion of work by female artists. In addition to her sculptures, Williams worked in plexiglas creating furniture and producing standing lamps, tables and chairs that were sold and exhibited. The sculptures she showed early on at AIR were influenced by the furniture and were large, tall transparent plastic containers filled with newsprint. In 1963, Williams and Barbara Zucker met on Monhegan Island. During the 1960s, they shared an artist's studio on lower Broadway, Chinatown and Little Italy. For a brief period they worked to create sculptures and paintings that were mirrors of each other but all these works were destroyed. After leaving the AIR Gallery, Williams also designed silver jewelry for several years. Her late work is composed of graphic, black and white manipulated photographic images.

Her image is included in the iconic 1972 poster Some Living American Women Artists by Mary Beth Edelson.
