= Lee Adler (artist) =

American artist and screenprinter

Lee Adler (1926–2003) was an American painter and printmaker. His papers can be found in the Archives of American Art.

Active from the mid-1960s until the 1980s, he produced over 300 paintings and 75 editions of prints found in collections of a number of museums, including the Brooklyn Museum, Art Institute of Chicago, and the Metropolitan Museum of Art. The largest holdings of his work can be found at the Ulrich Museum of Art in Wichita, Kansas.

== Early life ==
He was born Leo Adler in New York City to Isidor and Anna Adler, Jewish immigrants from Eastern Europe, in 1926. There is, however, confusion about his birth year; during his artistic career, Adler consistently listed 1934 as his year of birth. According to his son, he did so in order to make himself seem like a younger artist as he was beginning his career in art. Adler graduated from James Madison High School in Brooklyn in 1942 and served in the U.S. Army between 1943 and 1946, spending the final year of his service in Japan immediately after the end of World War II. In 1948, he graduated with a BA degree in English from Syracuse University. In 1948–1949, he hitchhiked west, working at a steel mill in Chicago and then living in the bohemian artist community near Monterey, California. In 1949–50, Adler briefly pursued graduate studies in literature at the Sorbonne in Paris before returning to New York City.

== Career in advertising and marketing ==
Around 1952, Adler began working in the advertising industry in New York, eventually becoming a pioneer in the field of marketing research. His books on that topic include Attitude Research at Sea, edited by Lee Adler and Irving Crespi (1966); Plotting Marketing Strategy: A New Orientation, edited by Lee Adler (1967); Attitude Research on the Rocks, edited by Lee Adler and Irving Crespi (1968); Joint Ventures for Product Innovation by Lee Adler and James D. Hlavacek (1976); Managing the Marketing Research Function by Lee Adler and Charles S. Mayer (1977); and Readings in Managing the Marketing Research Function edited by Lee Adler and Charles S. Mayer (1980).

== Artistic career ==
In 1962–1964, Adler pursued studies at the Art Students League of New York, and in 1964–1965, he studied at the Brooklyn Museum Art School. His sketchbooks from the late 1950s and early 1960s contain numerous ink and watercolor drawings of Brooklyn's industrial waterfront, located not far from the artist's home in Brooklyn Heights, where he resided since 1959.

In 1967, Adler had his first solo exhibition at the Salpeter Gallery. In 1969, he studied printmaking at the Pratt Graphics Center, subsequently producing approximately 75 editions of screen prints. In 1974, his solo exhibition Industry and the Artist was held at the Hagley Museum. In 1977–78, Adler's solo exhibition traveled to the Albert White Gallery in Toronto, the Lillian Heidenberg Gallery in New York, the Weatherspoon Art Gallery in Greensboro, North Carolina, the Mint Museum of Art in Charlotte, North Carolina, and the Hermitage Foundation Museum in Norfolk, Virginia. The traveling exhibition was accompanied by a catalog with an essay Jeffrey Hoffeld. In 1983, Adler left Brooklyn and moved to Lime Kiln Farm, Climax, New York. He died in Climax in 2003 at the age of 77.
