= Grenville Davey =

British artist (1961–2022)

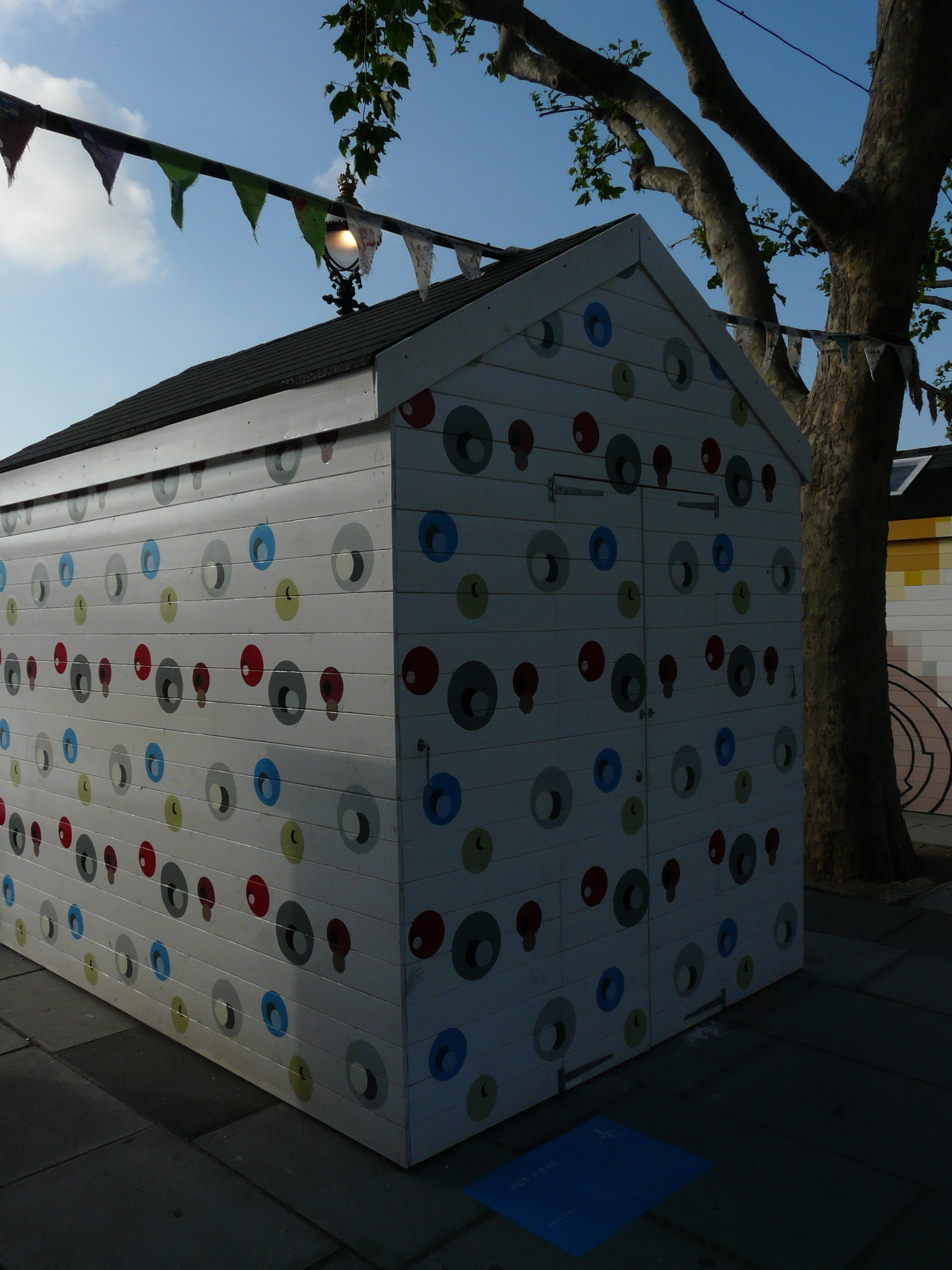
Hut Eye by Grenville Davey

Grenville Davey (28 April 1961 – 28 February 2022) was a British sculptor and winner of the 1992 Turner Prize.

Davey was a visiting professor of the University of the Arts London and programme leader, MA Fine Art at the University of East London. From December 2010 he became resident artist at the physics department of Queen Mary, University of London, working with David Berman. Grenville was the artist-in-residence at the Isaac Newton Institute for Mathematical Sciences from January to June 2012.

== Life ==
Born in Launceston, Cornwall, Davey first studied art in Exeter before going to Goldsmiths College in London in 1985 where he took a BA in fine art. His first solo show was at the Lisson Gallery in London in 1987.

Davey died following a long-term illness on 28 February 2022, at the age of 60. Davey is survived by his son, Sennen Davey, with his former wife, the sculptor Victoria Burton-Davey. a stepson, Charles, and three brothers, Graham, Chris and Adrian.

Davey played football with Dave Rowe in the summer of 1976.

== Work ==
Davey's work was influenced by the work of sculptors such as Tony Cragg and Richard Deacon and shows a similar interest in industrial materials. The simplicity of his forms shows an affinity with minimalism. Many of his works make references to everyday objects which if exhibited in themselves would be readymades. Button, a metre and a half wide clothes button made in steel, is a typical early work. Later works, such as Gold (Table) (a table as tall as a human) are larger in size. Primarily a sculptor, Davey produced a series of 12 prints with five other artists including etchings and screenprints.

London School of Hygiene & Tropical Medicine commissioned Davey to create a piece that reflected the maritime origins of the School, this resulted in a vast oak veneer wave wall. This is part of the School's contemporary art programme, which started in 2000.The initial idea was to commission or purchase some sculptures and pictures, but the building has relatively few suitable spaces for placing or hanging art. So instead the emphasis shifted towards commissioning works that fitted, both in terms of the themes of the school and the architecture of the building.

== Awards ==
Davey won the Tate's Turner Prize in 1992. Entitled HAL, the work comprised two abstract steel objects, each measuring 244 x 122 cm (96 x 48 in).
