= The Poppy Field near Argenteuil =

1873 painting by Claude Monet

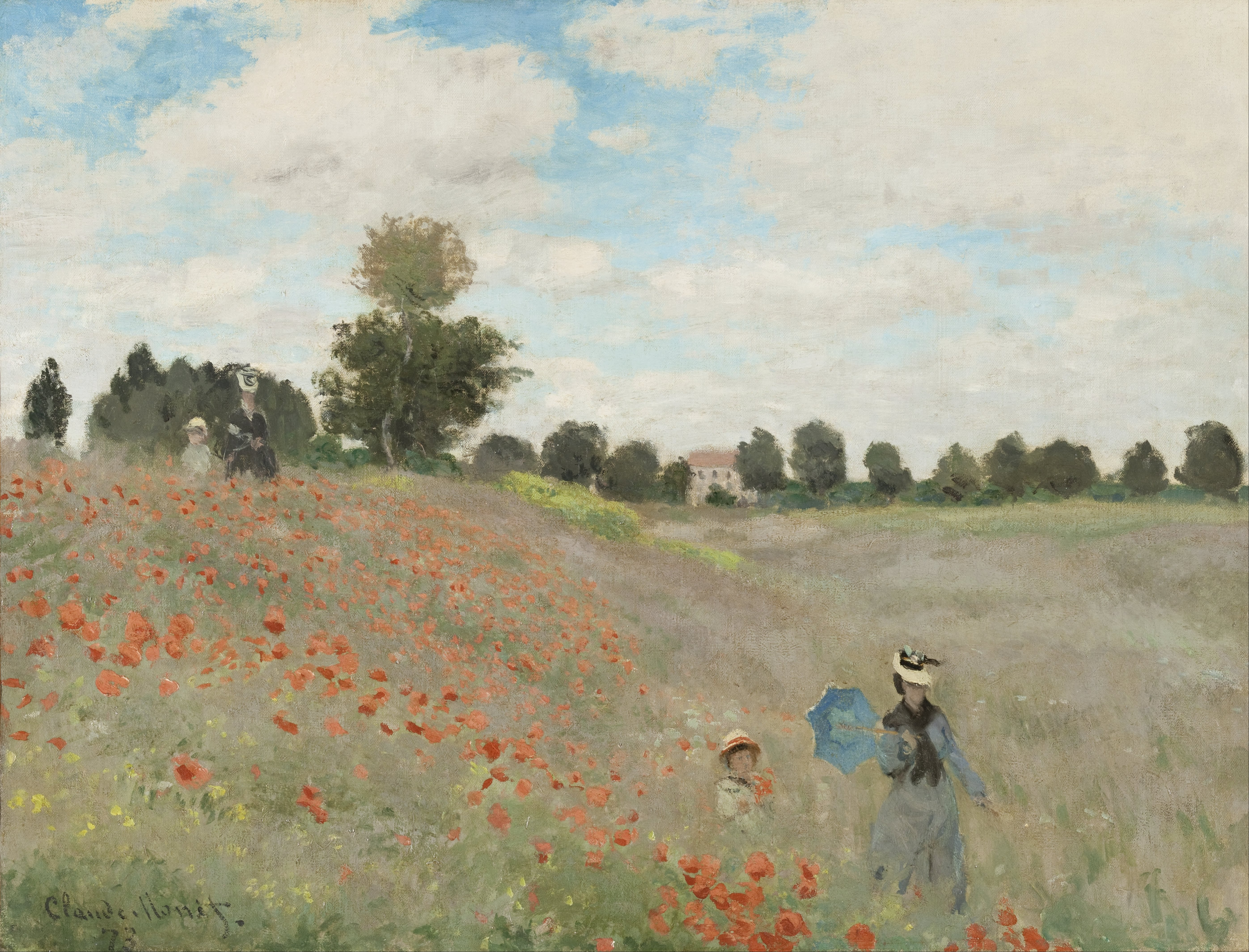
- Artist: Claude Monet
- Year: 1873
- Medium: Oil on canvas
- Dimensions: 50 cm × 65 cm (20 in × 26 in)
- Location: Musée d'Orsay; Paris

The Poppy Field near Argenteuil (French: Coquelicots) is an oil-on-canvas landscape painting by the French Impressionist Claude Monet, completed in 1873.

Following its donation to the French state in 1906 by Étienne Moreau-Nélaton, it was housed successively in the Louvre, Musée des Arts Décoratifs and the Jeu de Paume. It has been exhibited at the Musée d'Orsay in Paris since 1986.

== Background ==
Claude Monet, then aged 33, lived in Argenteuil (Val-d'Oise) when he completed this painting in 1873.

Titled in French Les Coquelicots, Coquelicots, or Coquelicots, la promenade, this painting was presented the following year at the First Impressionist Exhibition. It brings together some characteristics of impressionist works: an outdoor painting, light shades and sketched details.

Acquired by the art merchant Paul Durand-Ruel, it then passed into the property of the painter Ernest Duez, the singer and collector Jean-Baptiste Faure, and the painter and collector Étienne Moreau-Nélaton. It became property of the French state by the donation of Moreau-Nélaton in 1906. First held by the Département des Peintures of the Louvre Museum, it is currently assigned to the Musée d'Orsay.

== Composition ==
This painting, probably painted in the vicinity of Argenteuil, then a rural area, depicts a large field, with poppies dominating the left-hand side. In the foreground is a woman with a parasol and straw hat, accompanied by a child. In the middle ground, we see a couple similar to the first. The background, at the far end of the field, consists of a row of trees, with a house visible.

The two mother-child couples mark out an oblique structuring the painting. The left half is dominated by red and the right by a blue-green. The woman in the foreground is probably Camille Doncieux, the artist's wife, accompanied by a young Jean Monet, who, born in 1867, would be six years old in this scene.

== See also ==
- List of paintings by Claude Monet
