= George Pocheptsov =

American painter

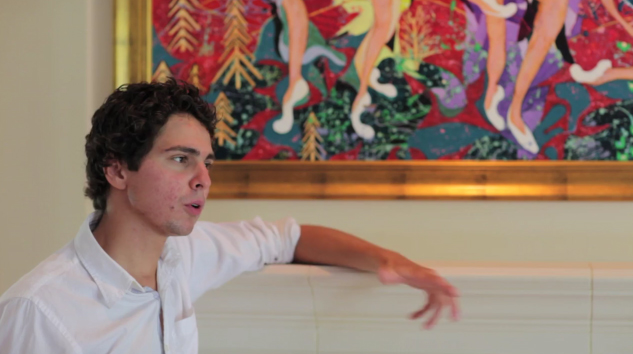
- Pocheptsov at the University of North Carolina Wilmington Ann Flack Boseman Gallery (2009)
- Born: George Oleg Pocheptsov VII; January 29, 1992 (age 34); Philadelphia, Pennsylvania, U.S.
- Education: Autodidact
- Known for: Modern Art, Painting, Drawing, Printmaking, Sculpture
- Notable work: "Magic Garden", "Primavera", “Endless Universe”, “Stage Beauties”, “Temple of Life”, “Mimi’s World”, "Flotilla", "Surfers", "Wishing Well"
- Movement: Surrealism, Magic Realism
- Website: georgepocheptsov.com

George Oleg Pocheptsov VII (born January 29, 1992) is an American painter, draughtsman and entrepreneur.

== Life and career ==
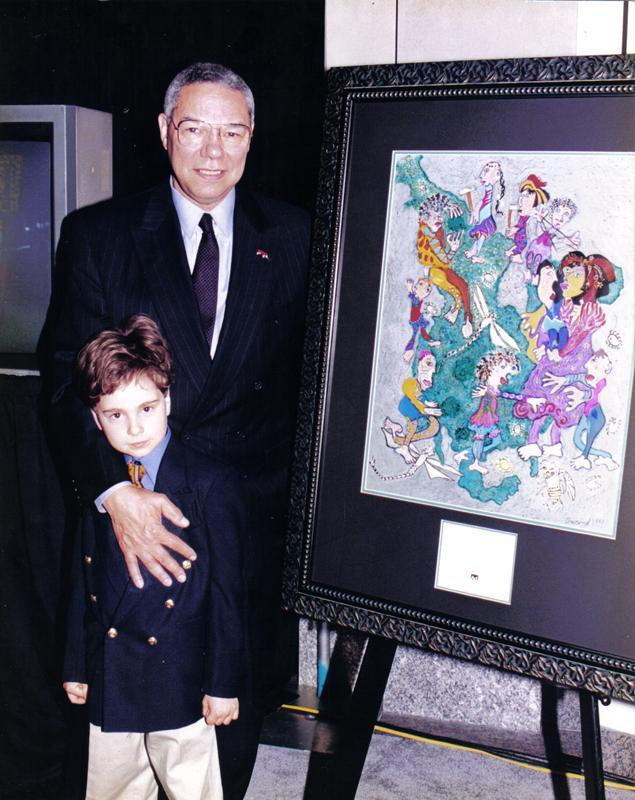
Pocheptsov with Colin Powell (1998)

=== Early life ===
George Pocheptsov, who is sometimes also referred to as "Georgie", was born in Philadelphia, Pennsylvania, in 1992 to Ukrainian parents. When Pocheptsov was eleven months old, his father was diagnosed with brain cancer; and he died in 1995, at the age of forty.

He began painting before he could speak, and never had any formal arts education prior to college. While in high school, he began to work on sculpture, as well as painting. While in college, he focused more on his studies, but would still paint in his spare time.

=== Collections and acquisitions ===
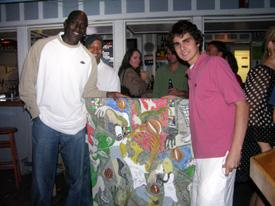
Pocheptsov with Michael Jordan (2009)

In recent years, Pocheptsov has been commissioned to create paintings for Colin Powell, Hillary Clinton, Celine Dion, Alain Ducasse, Michael Jordan, among other famous collectors. He was commissioned to create "sculptured canvas," a self-defined technique, for the Mitchell Camera Museum in London and for the United Nations' 60th anniversary exhibition.

Pocheptsov was also invited to Geneva, Switzerland for a book titled The Arts and Copyright in which he was featured as an artistic figure.

Internationally, Pocheptsov has been featured in museums and galleries in England, France, Korea, South Africa, the Netherlands, Russia, Japan, and Ukraine.

=== Appearance in popular culture ===
The media and prominent art collectors refer to Pocheptsov as a child prodigy, especially in the earlier part of his life. Pocheptsov art career appears in magazines and newspapers such as The New York Times, Time, People, Parents, The Washingtonian, US Art, Art and Antiques, Art News, Architectural Digest, Southern Living, Spirit of the Carolinas, among other publications.

A documentary film detailing Pocheptsov’s life titled, A Brush with Destiny, won four Emmy Awards.

== Philanthropy and charitable work ==
Pocheptsov has used his art career to fund charitable contributions to several charities. In many cases, Pocheptsov donates artwork to a charitable organization, and this artwork is subsequently auctioned at a gala or fundraiser to benefit the charity. Pocheptsov has donated at least five million dollars' worth of his art to charity. Just a few examples of the many charities supported, include the America’s Promise Alliance by Colin Powell, Georgetown University Pediatrics, Duke University Pediatrics, Adam Walsh Child Resource Center, Habitat for Humanity, the American Cancer Society, The Brain Tumor Awareness Organization, and many others. Overall, he supports between thirty and sixty charities each year. As another means to support a cause, in 2004, Pocheptsov was commissioned to create an official United States postage stamp for the Brain Tumor Awareness Organization.

== Personal life ==
Pocheptsov graduated from Harvard University in 2014.

He speaks fluent Russian, Ukrainian, French, and English. He is also proficient in Latin.

== See also ==
- List of child prodigies
- List of painters
- List of American artists
- Surrealism
- Contemporary Art
