= Portland State Office Building =

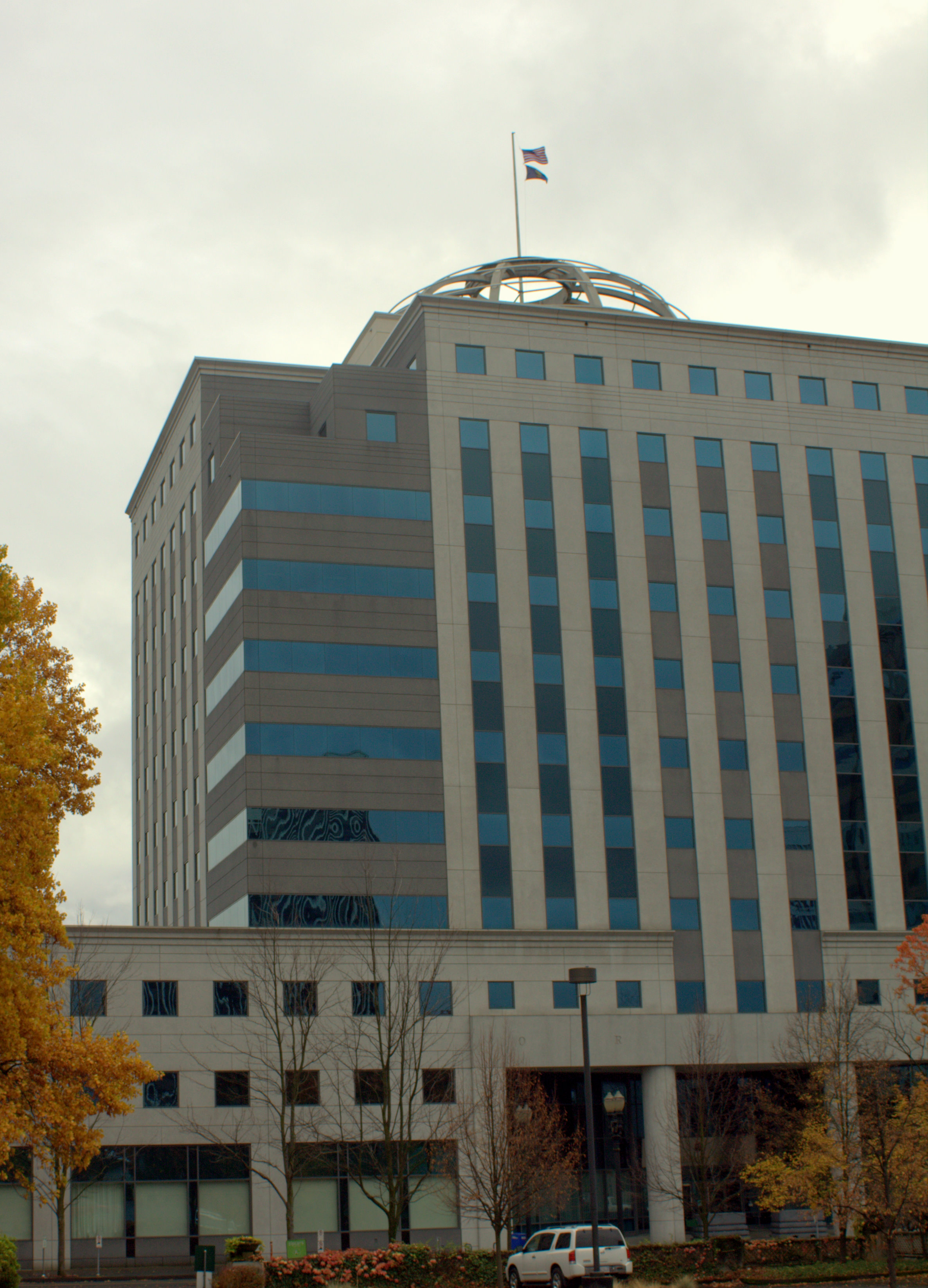
- The building in 2009
- Interactive map of the Portland State Office Building area

General information
- Type: Government building
- Location: 800 Northeast Oregon Street, Portland, Oregon, United States
- Coordinates: 45.5282806°N 122.6574561°W

The Portland State Office Building is a government building located at 800 Northeast Oregon Street in Portland, Oregon's Lloyd District, in the United States.

== See also ==
- Ideals (sculpture)
