= The Singing Butler =

1992 painting by Jack Vettriano

- Artist: Jack Vettriano
- Year: 1992
- Type: Oil on canvas

The Singing Butler is an oil-on-canvas painting made by Scottish artist Jack Vettriano in 1992. The painting measures 28 in × 36 in (71 cm × 91 cm). It depicts a couple in evening dress dancing on the damp sand of a beach on the coast of Fife, with grey skies above a low horizon. The man wears a dinner jacket and evening pumps; the woman mostly matches the formal dress of her partner by wearing a red cocktail dress with matching long gloves, but is in bare feet instead of wearing shoes. Two attendants to the left and right, a maid and a butler respectively, hold up umbrellas against the weather; the butler is as formally dressed as the male dancer with the addition of a bowler hat, while the maid wears a standard housekeeping uniform with a white apron and clutches her hat against the wind.

As a contemporary cultural icon, The Singing Butler has been compared to Grant Wood's American Gothic. Vettriano described the painting as an "uplifting fantasy" and chose the subject after being complimented on his paintings of beaches. He added the servants to balance the painting's composition, and once claimed that the titular butler is singing Fly Me to the Moon. The painting has been widely criticised by art critics, but has been popular with the public to the point of being one of the most reproduced paintings in Britain. The Singing Butler has been criticised for its uneven finishing, inconsistent lighting and treatment of wind, and for the odd position of the dancers. The dancers' pose is reversed from a normal closed dance hold. Usually, with the man leading, his left hand would hold the woman's right hand, and he would place his right hand on or below the woman's left shoulder blade, while she places her left hand on his right arm, just below the shoulder.

The painting was first sold in 1992 for £3,000; it was later sold by the buyer to one Alex Cruickshank in 1998 for £33,000. In 2003, an oil study for the painting was sold at auction for £89,600 while another auction saw the original painting being sold for £90,000. In April 2004, a further auction of the painting saw it being sold to a private collector for £744,800, a sum which at the time was the record for any Scottish painting and for any painting ever sold in Scotland.

In October 2005, it was reported that Vettriano had used a photographic reference guide, The Illustrator's Figure Reference Manual, as a basis for the figures in his painting. Vettriano initially stated that he had "used that manual for precisely what it is there for", that it was "no more than a tool, just like brushes or canvas", and that he wished people would compare the reference guide with the painting "and then tell me honestly that the guy who painted it isn't creative, that he doesn't have something going for him"; later, in a 2006 interview with BBC Scotland, he again said he was merely using the book for its intended purpose and firmly denied that he had stolen someone else's ideas, adding that he "had to actually construct the paintings" [sic] instead of merely copying the photographs. In a 2012 interview, Vettriano further retorted that Francis Bacon had his own copy of the Figure Reference Manual and that "Picasso said, 'Other artists borrow — I steal.'" Vettriano's agent, Tom Hewlett, said that it was not surprising that a self-taught artist like Vettriano would consult reference works during the early stages of his career, while Orla Brady, who portrayed the female dancer in the original Figure Reference Manual photograph, also came to Vettriano's defence.

Both The Singing Butler and its sister painting Dancer in Emerald were included in Vettriano's first London exhibition, "God's Children", at the Mall Galleries in October 1992. The original painting of The Singing Butler was displayed at Aberdeen Art Gallery in February 2012, its first public exhibition for twenty years, as part of an exhibition entitled From Van Gogh to Vettriano - Hidden Gems from Private Collections. The exhibition was well attended.

== Derivative works ==
An alternative version, variously referred to as The Singing Butler II or Dancer in Emerald, only features the dancing couple and the butler, with the woman wearing a green dress and gloves instead of the red articles in the original version (her feet, however, remain bare). In 2005, Banksy produced a parody version entitled "Crude Oil (Vettriano)" in which the maid is replaced by two figures in hazmat suits with an oil drum, while an oil tanker is shown sinking in the distance. Mark Hoppus bought Banksy's painting in 2011, and would later put it up for auction in March 2025 where it was sold for £4.3 million.
