= Georgia Museum of Art =

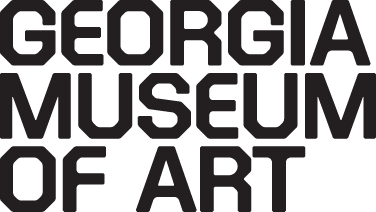
- Interactive fullscreen map
- Established: 1948
- Location: University of Georgia; 90 Carlton Street; Athens, Georgia
- Coordinates: 33°56′29″N 83°22′12″W
- Type: Art museum
- Website: georgiamuseum.org

The Georgia Museum of Art is an art museum in Athens, Georgia, United States, associated with the University of Georgia (UGA). The museum is both the university's academic museum and, since 1982, the official art museum of the state of Georgia. The permanent collection consists of American paintings, primarily 19th- and 20th-century; American, European and Asian works on paper; the Samuel H. Kress Study Collection of Italian Renaissance paintings; growing collections of southern decorative arts and Asian art; and a strong collection of works by African American artists. It numbers more than 17,000 works, growing every year.

The Georgia Museum opened on UGA's North Campus in 1948, in a building that now houses the university president's office, then moved to the Performing and Visual Arts Complex on UGA's East Campus in 1996. In 2011, it completed an extensive expansion and remodeling of its building, paid for entirely with externally raised funds and designed by Gluckman Mayner Architects, New York, that has allowed it to display its permanent collection continually. It organizes its own exhibitions in-house, creates traveling exhibitions for other museums and galleries and plays host to traveling exhibitions.

The foundation of the museum's collection, the Eva Underhill Holbrook Memorial Collection of American Art, a collection of 100 American paintings, was donated to UGA in 1945 by Holbrook in memory of his first wife. Included in this collection are works by Frank Weston Benson, William Merritt Chase, Stuart Davis, Arthur Dove, Georgia O'Keeffe, Childe Hassam, Winslow Homer, Jacob Lawrence, John Singer Sargent, and Theodore Robinson.

== Selected collection highlights ==
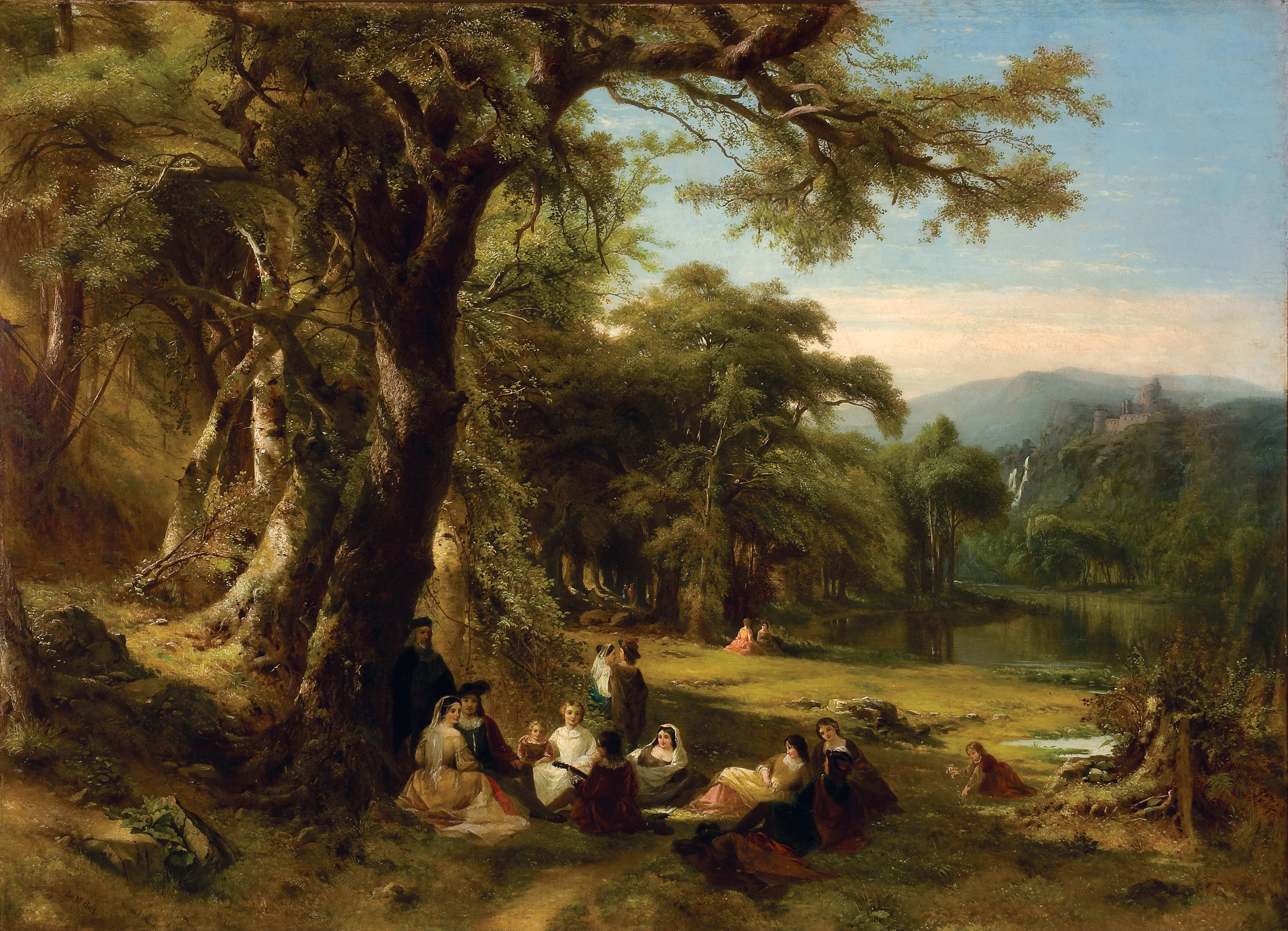
James McDougal Hart

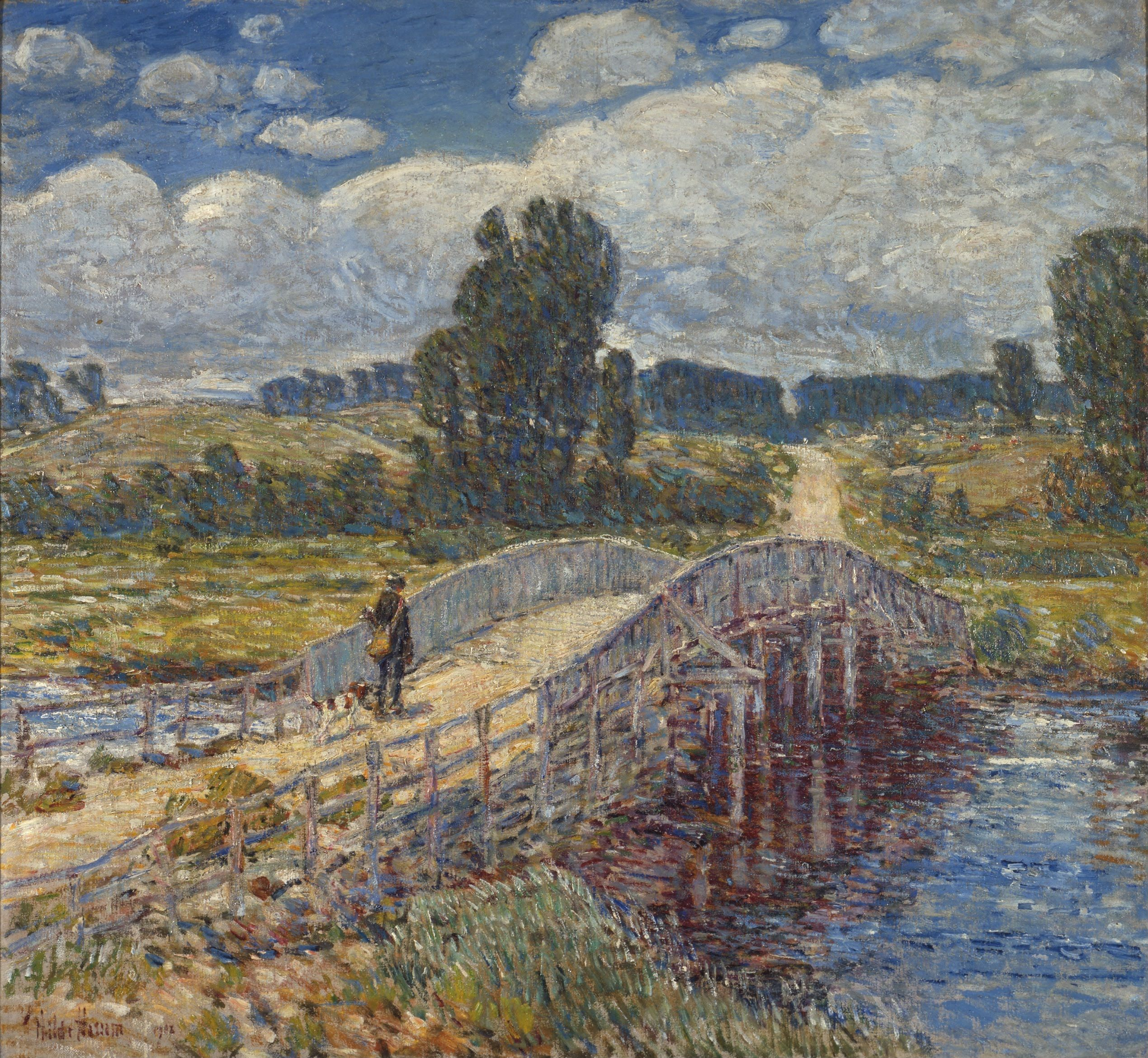
Childe Hassam
