= Muriel Castanis =

American sculptor

- Born: Muriel Brunner; September 27, 1926; New York City, US
- Died: November 22, 2006 (aged 80); New York City, US
- Known for: Sculpture
- Spouse: George Castanis

Muriel Brunner Castanis (1926 – 2006) was an American sculptor best known for her public art installments involving fluidly draped figures.

== Biography ==
Born as Muriel Brunner on September 27, 1926 in New York City, the youngest of six children. She was raised in Greenwich Village and attended New York's High School of Music and Art. Castanis did not begin her art career until 1964 at the age of 38, and she was self-taught.

Her image is included in the iconic 1972 poster Some Living American Women Artists by Mary Beth Edelson.

Her 1980 exhibit at the OK Harris Works of Art in Manhattan led to her career breakthrough. Her work Corporate Goddesses (1982), features twelve fiberglass statues of faceless women standing 12 feet tall atop 580 California Street building, designed by architect Philip Johnson; it has stirred varying interpretations, as viewers try to understand the symbolism.

She died on 22 November 2006 at age 80 from lung failure in Greenwich Village neighborhood in New York City, and was survived by her husband George Castanis and their four children.

== Works ==
Year	Name	Material	Location	Notes
1982	Corporate Goddesses	fiberglass	580 California Street, San Francisco, California	A series of twelve statues depicting female figures standing 12 feet tall and located along the edge of roofline of an office.
1991	Eagle Domain	bronze, granite base	Atlanta, Georgia	This is a tribute to Native Americans and features a 5-foot bronze figure on a 30-foot granite base located outside an office park.
1992	Ideals	bronze	Portland, Oregon	
1994	L.U.R.E. (LURE) Angels	epoxy, resin	New York City, New York	This is no longer on display, but is a sculpture of loose angel figures. Was previously located inside a bar in New York City.
