= Heresies: A Feminist Publication on Art and Politics =

American feminist journal (1977–1993)

Heresies
- Publisher: Heresies Collective
- Founded: 1977
- Ceased publication: 1993
- Language: English
- Headquarters: New York
- ISSN: 0146-3411
- OCLC number: 2917688

HERESIES: A Feminist Publication on Art and Politics (1977–1993) was a feminist journal that was produced by the New York-based Heresies Collective.

== History ==
HERESIES was a feminist magazine that published from 1977 to 1993, organized by a collective known as the Heresies Collective based in New York City. Each of the 27 issues was collectively edited by a group of volunteers interested in a single topic under the guidance of the "mother collective"; each issue had its own style and perspective. Subjects included feminist theory, art, politics, patterns of communication, lesbian art and artists, women's traditional arts and crafts, and politics of aesthetics, violence against women, working women, women from peripheral nations, women and music, sex, film, activism, racism, postmodernism, and coming of age. The journal was seen as not only a major contribution to the feminist art scene, but a major forum for feminist thinking. Heresies experimented with an editorial format that asked contributors to grapple with hierarchical and societal issues of difference by creating a public discourse in feminist thought and expression.

The first issue was dated January 1977 and had the theme, “Feminism, Art, & Politics.” A frontispiece featured a reproduction of Mandy Martin’s 1975 poster, The Drive Of The US Is To Replace The Traditional Status Values Of The Village Such As Writing Great Poetry With New Ones Like Owning A TV Set. The first issue showed a price of $2.50 on its cover and subscriptions were available at $10 for four issues. Opposite the frontispiece, on the verso of the cover, was a sort of manifesto for the journal signed by members of the Heresies Collective: Patsy Beckert, Joan Braderman, Mary Beth Edelson, Elizabeth Hess, Joyce Kozloff, Arlene Ladden, Lucy Lippard, Mary Miss, Marty Pottenger, Miriam Schapiro, Joan Snyder, Elke Solomon, Pat Steir, May Stevens, Michelle Stuart, Susana Torre, Elizabeth Weatherford, Sally Webster, and Nina Yankowitz. (Only Braderman, Harmony Hammond, Hess, Ladden, Lippard, and Stevens are identified as the “editorial collective.”) Content of the first issue included text from Martha Rossler’s Tijuana Maid, an article by Eva Cockcroft titled “Women in the Community Mural Movement”, a piece by Adrienne Rich titled “Women and Honor: Some notes on lying”, two articles about incarcerated women, a comic by Amy Sillman, excerpts from a pamphlet published by ALIMUPER, Action for the Liberation of Peruvian Women, and works by poets including Assata Shakur. Volume two, number 3, the spring 1979 issue, was the first to identify staff members in addition to the editorial committee. The final issue, LATINA - A Journal of Ideas, was published in 1993; the theme of the issue is thought to have been a direct response of the Collective to continuing critiques of lacking intersectionality they had been receiving from peers in the art world. That issue was not expected to be the final one. It lists upcoming issues on the topics of "Women on Men", autobiography, and hair.

== Voice ==
Hearing from individual voices was central to the publication's overall goal. Because they perceived themselves as being silenced by the patriarchy and anti-feminism movements at the time, the women of the publication hoped to use each issue to voice their thoughts on both everyday topics and more encompassing social matters. Each issue was compiled by a different group of women, chosen on an issue-by-issue basis, and edited by members of the Mother Collective. The first issue of Heresies, titled "Feminism, Art, and Politics," included feedback pages for the women to detail their initial hopes for the magazine moving forward, as well as personal thoughts on feminism.

== The Heresies Collective ==
The original Heresies Collective, at a retreat on Joan Snyder's farm in the late 1970s

The Heresies Collective attempted to function as an egalitarian system that abolished the idea of a hierarchy and the idea that some voices were more important than others. In modeling a new structure for working together, HERESIES emphasized a culture that would provide women with real alternatives to the patriarchal structures which they already experienced on a daily basis. Arguably, the non-hierarchical structure of production caused difficulties and slow-downs in producing issues as time went on, and, ultimately, led to conflict and the dissolution of the Collective in 1993.

== Artistry ==
To communicate a range of feminist ideologies and individual voices, each issue of Heresies contained a variety of artworks and written pieces submitted from women artists. By publishing their works and embracing commercialization in the name of widespread awareness, the Collective hoped to push back on the prestigious, male dominated art scene at the time. Their artistry also pushed to challenge dominant practices employed by popular magazines at the time. Through inexpensive methods of collaging, sewing, and appliquéing, the women assembled a reproducible magazine series full artistic expression and creative freedom. The artists hoped to reclaim these methods, which were historically assigned to women and deemed unprofessional, in the process.

The artwork and pieces created by the women were all hand-made, both by individuals and through collaborative effort. Rather than focusing on a finished product, the publication valued the rough, D.I.Y. aspects of their productions, feeling it gave pieces a sense of an artist's process. This "inside look" into creative technique also served to communicate to readers that anyone is capable of creativity.

== Reader collaboration ==
Issue fourteen, titled "The Women's Pages," was unique among its fellow issues throughout the publication's history. One page of the issue was intentionally left blank, and encouraged readers to contribute their own works of art and literature in the privacy of their own issues. In the issue's editorial statement, the collective voiced that the blank page acted as an effort to create a one of a kind issue for each individual. This single page reflected the overall mission of the collective to include all voices and empower their audience. Readers contributing to the page were able to act on their creativity and become a part of the feminist movement.

== Controversies ==
The Mother Collective were a group of women central to overseeing the publication, and held the responsibility for choosing each issue's topic. The collective would then recruit specific writers and artists they felt could carry out and address the subject in question; these individuals composed the Editorial Group for a given issue. However, these women were often called out for their lack of diversity, as both the Mother Collective and editorial groups were largely composed only of white women.

The concern over the lack of diversity was initially brought to the Collective's attention after the publication of the third issue, “Lesbian Art and Artists" (1977). Initially, the issue was praised for creating a safe space that allowed women to express their sexuality through their work. Enduring homophobia and marginalization from the hegemonic heterosexual culture meant that the issue provided a platform for lesbian women artists that they were typically otherwise unable to utilize. Though the issue included an acknowledgment of the Collective's biases ("We are all lesbians, white, college-educated, and mostly middle class women who live in New York and have a background in the arts"), the issue received criticism for failing to include lesbian artists of color.

Combahee River Collective, a black feminist organization, wrote the all-white editorial group demanding the oversight be addressed. Their letter was published in Heresies issue four, "Women's Traditional Arts," by the Heresies Collective, as a gesture of accountability. In following years, to be more inclusive and focus on the subject of race, Heresies chose topics centered around diversity, and published the issues "Third World Women" (1979) and "Racism is the Issue" (1982).

== Members of the Mother Collective ==
Around nineteen women were founders:

- Joan Braderman
- Mary Beth Edelson
- Harmony Hammond
- Elizabeth Hess
- Joyce Kozloff
- Arlene Ladden
- Lucy Lippard
- Mary Miss
- Marty Pottenger
- Miriam Schapiro
- Joan Snyder
- Elke Solomon
- Pat Steir
- May Stevens
- Michelle Stuart
- Susana Torre
- Elizabeth Weatherford
- Sally Webster
- Nina Yankowitz

== Table of Issues ==
Issue Number	Issue Title	Year Published	Main Topic/ Content Summary	Controversies/Context
1	Heresies: A Feminist Publication on Art and Politics	1977	With their first issue, the Heresies Collective was still very much finding their niche in the feminist art world. Beyond general statements on examining oppression through artistic and practical lenses in the Collective’s editorial statement, a clear thematic goal was not really established— at least, not in comparison to the themes outlined in later issues. The issue itself was poetry-heavy compared to later issues within the same general period.	
2	Patterns of Communication and Space Among Women	1977	This is the first issue in which the Collective examined their own process, and though it failed to include aspects of later critiques the Collective would receive from contemporaries (like concerns of diversity within issues), it did metatextually frame what the Collective was experiencing as not a series of frustrations and complications, but an opportunity to learn and better their processes. This approach would continue to be used by the Collective as they addressed critiques and altered their behaviors in future issues.	
3	Lesbian Art & Artists	1977	Focusing largely on the expression of sexuality in art, the third issue gave lesbians a place to talk about their (usually socially taboo) experiences both entwined with and unrelated to the art world. Submissions chosen for the issue were largely prosaic, with a portion of the works also being poetic or photographic in nature.	Printed in the final pages of the following issue (“Women’s Traditional Arts”) was a letter from the Combahee River Collective, whose membership included activists such as Audre Lorde, criticizing the overwhelming whiteness of the “Lesbian Art & Artists” issue.
4	Women’s Traditional Arts: The Politics of Aesthetics	1978	The fourth issue was an opportunity for the Collective and contributors to examine the political forces behind typical artworks and “aesthetics” associated with femininity and traditionality. Works themselves were often multimodal, with photographic collage being interlaid with text, or poetic stanzas incorporating painted backgrounds.	
5	The Great Goddess	1978	With an issue focused on the relationship between spirituality and womanhood, the Collective hoped to focus on an encompassing view of the experience of women and their individuality in the religious and communal sphere. A main goal of the issue was to provide a productive space to harbor the complex emotions many women (and thus, contributors to this issue) have towards and surrounding religion and their treatment within it.	This is the first issue where the Collective themselves publicly spoke on the strain their collaborative process was experiencing, and had experienced over the course of this issue. (Editorial Statement, issue 5) In the editorial statement for their 12th anniversary issue, the collective identifies this (alongside issue #12) as their most controversial.
6	On Women and Violence	1978	Though the titular focus of their sixth issue was violence (and violence against women), the Collective worked to produce an issue that was more than just another series of documentations of systemic or personal violence. They hoped, with an issue that addressed international scales and intersectionality, to spark discussion and “radical change”— the literary and artistic means of fighting back.	
7	Women Working Together	1979	This issue is largely a creative analysis of the ways in which women work together, both productively or otherwise, with a focus on what is effective— a topic the collective points to as being under-considered. The goal was to present a series of solutions to encourage more productive processes and mindsets when, inevitably, workings between women encountered problems.	The editorial team for this issue wrote in their statement that they took inspiration from their own conflicts and problem-solving (or lack thereof) over the course of making issue 7.
8	Third World Women	1979	Issue 8 had a different approach to the racial, ethnic, and “marketable” differences between artists of color and the white women who had thus far predominantly been featured in Heresies issues; compared to their later magazine title and theme “Racism is the Issue” in 1982, “Third World Women” (released three years before “Racism”) focused on the works and experiences of the individual, and highlighted circumstance and economic factors with equal consideration to racial ones. “Third World Women” was an initial effort on the part of the Collective to initiate non-white female artists into the “system” of feminist artwork.	The editorial collective for this issue was composed of “third world women," who reported consistent awkwardness of communication with the Mother Collective and a general sense of misunderstanding and (what would now likely be referred to as) tokenism.
9	Organized Women Divided	1980	“Organized Women Divided” seemed to be addressing the differing viewpoints from varying vocal feminists about how best to change the existing social normatives, expectations, and roles of the time. The issue took an overall stance prioritizing and arguing for freedom to exist “as we are,” as opposed to changing how women think, operate, and present themselves to become, somehow, less feminine/challenging or more androgynously palatable. In short, it was an issue of refusing to be “othered.”	
10	Women and Music	1980	Largely, “Women and Music” was an effort to recognize overlooked female musicians of the past and uplift contemporary female musicians whose careers and artistry was not receiving the same attention as their male peers. Articles ranged from fictional interviews acknowledging the role of religion in the musical development of many historical female musicians, to analyses of the healing and cathartic role music can play in day-to-day living, to compiled accounts from female music critics (an arena often assumed to be dominantly male), to biographical coverage of now-deceased female composers. Personal anecdotes and samples of sheet music or innovative compositions were littered throughout the issue. The issue was recognizably shorter than its preceders, with less than 100 pages of content.	
11	Making Room - Women and Architecture	1981	Revolving around analysis of the history of architecture—how things were not built for/by women or with women in mind—and the then-current and future ideas of female-oriented spaces and environments was reportedly five years in the making before “Making Room," “Making Room” was less a literal exploration of concrete buildings and more a way for the contributing artists to work through feelings of powerlessness in the world at large, with manifestations of those frustrations lying in the architectural sphere. Works included in the issue discussed historical malignments, exclusion from architectural artistry and opportunities, and what differing attitudes female architects and designers could perhaps bring to the design world at large.	
12	Sex Issue	1981	The nearly-titular focus of this issue was sexuality, and specifically, the subset of its workings that many term “desire.” A significant consideration was given to the relationship between sexuality/desire and gender, though the specifics of that distinction (or overlap) were left up to personal discussion in each individual contribution, as the Collective decided there was no set standard for what should and should not be considered in the dimensions of sexuality and sexual discussion. Ultimately, the issue works towards helping the reader to begin to consider their own sexuality and sexual viewpoints independently, and how those considerations may tie into the ideals of feminism (of the time).	The Collective’s effort to examine “desire” was met with internal conflict, as nobody could seem to agree what “desire” was. Several additional editorial statements, with acknowledgement of individual perspectives, are peppered throughout the issue as a whole. In the editorial statement for their 12th anniversary issue, the collective identifies this (alongside issue #5) as their most controversial.
13	Earthkeeping/Earthshaking: Feminism & Ecology	1981	This is the first Heresies issue to directly and overarchingly address women’s contributions to ecology and the scientific sphere, and the limitations female scientists had and continued to face as a result of their gender. Several works addressed the lack of attention given to Native American women and traditions in relation to the environment and its keeping; these are among the first and few articles to be directly written by individuals of Native heritage in Heresies. The vast majority of works in the issue were written by women not of Native descent. A significant portion of the issue was dedicated to scientific analysis of then-current environmental phenomena, such as nuclear power concerns; many articles were formatted as interviews with experts, firsthand witnesses, or female authorities in specific ecological fields whose work or voices had previously gone ignored in the mainstream. A strong poetic presence was also maintained throughout the issue, with poems sourced from women cross-culturally.	The “Klickitat” people mentioned in the editorial statement of this issue refer to themselves as Qwû'lh-hwai-pûm or χwálχwaypam (meaning “prairie people”). The Human Life Statute (introduced in the 97th US Congress in 1981-1982) referenced in the editorial statement sought to define “person”/ “human life” beginning at conception. The Family Protection Act, introduced around the same period in that same Congress and also referenced in the editorial statement, aimed to amplify parental rights—especially in the classroom—and remove federal restrictions on religious operations in public contexts. Neither bill ended up being passed, but the Collective expressed concern about their introductions.
14	The Women’s Pages	1982	With this issue, the Collective embraced the idea that what they were publishing was mass-reproduced artwork meant to convey a message on a large scale. Their editorial statement expresses a prior unwillingness to be categorized as reproducible because of the “lowbrow” connotations to the designation, but in moving forward to create this overwhelmingly visual issue—full of high-contrast black and white collages, prints, linocuts, and graphics, with little-to-no prose present on a given page—the Collective worked to make the statement that communication through reproducing and circulating visual media and art is effective, meaningful, and a worthy use of an artistically driven group’s time and effort.	
15	Racism is the Issue	1982	“Racism is the Issue” took steps to address the systemic experiences of people of color in the real world through art, but also incorporated a layer of self-reflection, pointing out the racism prevalent within the art world and giving a platform to artists whose work and careers have been affected by it. The issue was one of the Collective’s shortest yet, at a total of 76 pages including the indexes and cover.	Potentially a response to previous criticism about Heresies’ overall whiteness.
16	Film / Video / Media	1983	Focusing on the work women had been and continued to do unrecognized in film, video, and media, especially in larger commercial settings, issue 16 was an exploration of the varying means of communication, developing in step with the technology of the time. Though hindered briefly in publication by an unsteady workload and submission/revision expectations, it concerned itself largely with the media women were directly producing, as opposed to how women were portrayed in media produced by men.	
17	Acting Up! Women in Theatre and Performance	1984	Acting almost as an extension into the theatrical sphere of 1983’s “Film/Video/Media” issue, “Acting Up!” contained interviews with playwrights, excerpts from scripts and reviews, mock scripts commentating on expected roles/archetypes for women in production, mini-memoir accounts of personal experience, and discussions of the intersection between intention and interpretation in theatre/performance.	
18	Mothers, Mags, & Movie Stars - Feminism & Class	1985	Class and feminism are explored through the lens of mothers—a representation of often-overlooked realities of self, identity, and desire—as opposed to economic categories in issue 18. Taking into account the overwhelming influence of movies and media that affect women’s and girls’ ideas of what they should be, pieces in the issue tackle changing body image and transformation, the beauty and simultaneous sexlessness of ads and magazines, the intersection of feminine and racial expectations (especially in job spheres/environments of white dominance), and socially accepted/institutionally encouraged procedures for cosmetic purposes veiled in “health.” Performance art from multiple artists is featured throughout the issue.	Issues 18 and 19 were released as a double-issue in late 1985, the first release in about a year since “Acting Up!” in 1984. A benefit for the issues was held on Feb. 20th, 1986. This issue was dedicated to Ana Mendieta, a contributor to several issues of Heresies who died under suspicious circumstances in September 1985.
19	Satire	1985	In this shorter companion issue to “Mothers, Mags, & Movie Stars,” the artists featured in this issue conduct a sociological analysis of feminist topics utilizing unexpected delivery for a humorous effect. Commentary topics include the federal and judicial overbearing on women’s bodies and sexual lives, as well as women who protest against women/women’s rights on behalf of misogynistic forces. Deactualization/realization style reframing in some pieces acts as a means to force readers to reflect on their own preconceptions and accustomations.	In the 20th issue, the collective apologized to the author of the letter on page 19 for listing her name in the table of contents, which mitigated the intended anonymity of the work. It is unclear to what letter this apology refers, as page 19 only features comics.
20	HERESIES (20th Issue)	1986	The twentieth issue sought to revisit the Collective’s initial topic and questions of activism. A comparison was drawn between the activism of ten years prior and the then-contemporary activism seen by the contributing artists and collective— what changed? What hadn’t? No unifying media format or underlying, narrowed-down social focus encompassed the issue’s theme; it was a homecoming of an issue, revisiting the first Heresies’ generalized exploration and the areas of progression and stagnation inherent to a ten-year passage of time.	
21	Food is a Feminist Issue	1987	An exploration of the bonds created between women as a result of nuclear family structure relegating women to family care and food preparation, prompting recipe sharing and innovation, as well as public social circumstance of segregated eating spaces, issue 21 is a presentation of the duplicity of the illusion of choice in food markets and selection, delving into the way food represents a power struggle for control and freedom.	Margaret Randall, mentioned before the editorial statement of this issue, won her Board of Immigration Appeals case and had her citizenship to the US restored.
22	Art in Unestablished Channels	1987	Explored in issue 22 is art created outside of the mainstream commercial market, for or from perspectives of specific communities or areas traditionally not incorporated into what is considered traditional “art.”	
23	Coming of Age	1988	Issue 23 works largely through essay and photography to determine what the phrase “coming of age” means to women throughout the phases of their lives, and explore the unity of the experience that stems from that identity even in spite (or perhaps because) of varied backgrounds and lives. It tackles a variety of topics that may be deemed “unsightly” or “controversial” due to their uncomfortable/socially taboo natures— abortion, specific bodily changes due to aging/menopause, and disease among them.	
24	12 YEARS (Anniversary Issue)	1989	Heresies’ “12 Years” anniversary issue, in many ways, reverts back to the approach taken with issue one in 1977. Pieces explore what feminist art means, how that art is relevant and has remained relevant over the time Heresies has been in production; the issue contains a significant array of art centered around anatomy, intermingled with essays regarding varying cultural impacts and influence to both art and artists.	This issue was dedicated to Lyn Blumenthal, a contributor to Heresies who died of a heart attack in 1988.
25	The Art of Education	1990	Originally, the Collective planned to focus the “Education” issue on ideas of formal vs informal education, the necessity of higher degrees, and the limitations faced by women in pursuit of any level of institutional learning. The submissions they received, however, centered more on the process of learning itself— the “horror stories” and miseducation tales, but also the teachers and students who uplifted learning and teaching to a welcoming and compelling experience. As a result, the Collective decided to orient the issue towards those recollections less palatable to larger or more scientific journals, and compose the issue around these nuanced poetic, photographic, and narrative compositions.	Above the editorial statement for this issue, the collective announced an upcoming new format for Heresies, wherein thematic cohesivity would be exchanged for a “thematic core” and issues’ contributions would be relevant to current feminist matters of the time without necessarily being tied to that theme. It is possible that this was an attempt to bolster the amount of content submitted to a given issue and return all issues to their initial, 100+ page count, but because the magazine only released two issues after this announcement, overall success is unclear.
26	IDIOMA - A Journal of Feminist Post-Totalitarian Criticism	1992	“IdiomA” was the Heresies Collective’s first official collaboration with another art magazine to be published as a joint issue. The “theme” of the issue followed Eastern-European aesthetics as it explored the methods of cultural analysis commonly applied by artists as well as a culture at large with the goal of contributing to and challenging those methods, particularly with an added layer of consideration for the repression and propagandistic influence of a totalitarian or otherwise limiting regime. It was an interdisciplinary and international issue of communication and collaboration.	This issue was a collaboration with IdiomA, a Russian collaborative similar to that of the American Heresies. Some of the issue was published in Russian, with an overall Eastern-European aesthetic throughout
27	LATINA	1993	Developed over 5 years, LATINA’s goal was to give voice to overlooked female artists and specifically latina female artists who are excluded from American presentations of “Latin art.” Written partially in Spanish on a piece-by-piece basis, the contents of the issue are of multimedial composition, with different approaches fairly evenly balanced throughout the issue.	LATINA was the longest issue Heresies had produced in several years, at 121 pages, but had an editorial collective of only three: Josely Carvalho, Marina Gutiérrez, and Susana Torruella Leval.

== See also ==
- Feminist art movement in the United States
- Feminist art criticism
- The Heretics
