= Heresies Collective =

The Heresies Collective was founded in 1976 in New York City, by a group of feminist political artists. The group sought to examine art from a feminist and political perspective. In addition to a variety of actions and cultural output, the collective was responsible for the overseeing the publication of the journal Heresies: A feminist publication on art and politics, which was published from 1977 until 1993.

== Background ==
The Heresies Collective was founded in 1976 by a group of feminist artists, with the goal of increasing discourse around the ideas of feminism, politics, and their relationship to art. The Heresies Collective's primary output was a reoccurring publication titled Heresies: A feminist publication on art and politics. The goals of the collective, through the publication of their journal, were to encourage the writing of feminist history, generate new creative energies among women artists, broaden the definition of art, and articulate diversity within the art world. The collective also advertised a Women's Slide Registry and magazine publication workshops, both hosted in their offices. In addition to the goals of encouraging and supporting feminist political art, the collective sought to stimulate dialogue around radical political and esthetic theory, and reject the capitalist framework of the art world through interrogating the processes by which art is created, critiqued, and consumed. According to the masthead of the first issue, the collective had a mailing address in 105 Hudson Street, New York City, known at that time as the Fine Arts Building. The masthead indicated moves to 225 Lafayette Street (in volume 1, no. 4, 1978), 611 Broadway Rm 609 (in volume 4, no. 4, 1983), and care of the Foundation for the Community of Artists at 280 Broadway, suite 412, from volume 5, no. 1, 1984 until the end of the publication run in 1993.

=== Members ===
The founding collective members listed in the first publication were: Patsy Beckert, Joan Braderman, Mary Beth Edelson, Harmony Hammond, Elizabeth Hess, Joyce Kozloff, Arlene Ladden, Lucy Lippard, Mary Miss, Marty Pottenger, Miriam Schapiro, Joan Snyder, Elke Solomon, Pat Steir, May Stevens, Susana Torre, Elizabeth Weatherford, Sally Webster, and Nina Yankowitz.

Numerous other feminist artists contributed to the publication over the years, and participated in the collective structure. The film The Heretics, created by collective member Joan Braderman, lists the following additional women as members of the Heresies Collective: Joan Snyder, Pat Steir, Michelle Stuart, Emma Amos, Patsy Beckert, Janet Froelich, Su Friedrich, Ida Applebroog, Sue Heinemann, Sabra Moore, Miriam Schapiro, Cecilia Vicuna, Nina Yankowitz, and Amy Sillman.

== Collective activities ==
While the publication was the primary activity of the collective, members of the group were also involved with other arts and political movements in New York. The collective was featured in an exhibit at the New Museum in 1983, titled Classified: Big Pages from the Heresies Collective. The exhibit featured large scale works from members of the collective, and was curated in part by En Foco, as part of the Events series. In 1984 the collective staged a demonstration in front of the Museum of Modern Art called the Women Artists Visibility Event (W.A.V.E.), or Let MOMA Know, aimed at raising awareness about the poor representation of women artists at the museum.

The Heresies Collective was also the subject of a documentary film, called The Heretics. The film was conceived and directed by Heresies Collective member Joan Braderman.
