= The Heretics (2009 film) =

The HERETICS
- Directed by: Joan Braderman
- Written by: Joan Braderman
- Produced by: Crescent Diamond
- Narrated by: Joan Braderman
- Cinematography: Lily Henderson
- Edited by: Scott Hancock; Kathy Schermerhorn
- Music by: June Millington
- Distributed by: Women Make Movies
- Release date: October 9, 2009
- Running time: 91 minutes
- Country: United States
- Language: English

The Heretics is a 2009 American documentary film written and directed by Joan Braderman and distributed by Women Make Movies. It focuses on a group of New York-based feminist artists called the Heresies Collective, and their influential art journal, Heresies: A Feminist Publication on Art and Politics, which was published from 1977 to 1992.

== Synopsis ==
The Heretics is a semi-autobiographical documentary, following Braderman's first-person account of her arrival in New York City in 1971 and her introduction to the arts culture of Lower Manhattan. This narrative becomes a framing device for the bulk of the film, which consists of intimate interviews with former Heresies Collective members, documenting their involvement with Heresies: A Feminist Publication on Art and Politics and exploring feminism in the art world during the height of the second wave women’s movement, as well as in modern times. The titles of both the magazine and film were inspired by the credo, "new truths begin as heresies."

== Production ==
Braderman began work on the documentary in 2006, travelling across the U.S., as well as to Spain and Italy, to interview twenty-eight former members of the Heresies Collective.

The Heretics incorporates interview footage shot in 24p mini-dv video with still images, 3D animation, archival footage, and staged scenes where young actresses play the roles of collective members. The aesthetic of the film has been described as "radical collage," evoking both the original magazine as well as Braderman's early video art.

June Millington, a so-called “Godmother of Women's Music,” provided an original soundtrack, in collaboration with her nephew, Lee Madeloni. When Millington, who said the Heresies magazine "was in every hip loft and living space I stayed at," heard the film was in post-production, she tracked down Braderman in her studio, watched the rough-cut for 10 minutes, and said, "all of your music needs were just resolved."

The former collective members featured in the film include Emma Amos, Ida Applebroog, Mary Beth Edelson, Su Friedrich, Janet Froelich, Harmony Hammond, Joyce Kozloff, Lucy Lippard, Amy Sillman, Susana Torre, Cecelia Vecunia, and Nina Yankowitz.

The Heretics premiered in a solo screening at the Museum of Modern Art in New York in 2009, where it ran for a week.

== Reception ==
The Heretics was well-received by press such as The New York Times, which said the film "gives a joyful sense of what it was like to be a feminist in the 1970s." Ariel Dougherty said in On The Issues Magazine, "Thanks to Braderman and her savvy crew, in The Heretics, we have a compelling powerhouse example of feminism’s creative force."

Some reviewers criticized the film's nostalgia, while others such as Aaron Cutler from Slant Magazine, accused The Heretics of vagueness, saying the film produces "general statements about how hard it is for women to succeed in a man’s world."

== See also ==
- Heresies: A Feminist Publication on Art and Politics
- Heresies Collective
- Joan Braderman
