= Janet Froelich =

American graphic designer and creative director

- Born: 1946 (age 79–80); New York, NY
- Occupation: Graphic designer
- Known for: Publication design

Janet Froelich (born 1946, New York, NY) is an American graphic designer and creative director.

== Biography ==
Janet Froelich received her undergraduate degree from Cooper Union and an MFA from Yale University. She was a designer of Heresies, a feminist journal that was produced from 1977 to 1993 by the New York-based Heresies Collective. Froelich was featured in The Heretics, a film that examines the inside story of the "second wave" of the Women's Movement.

Froelich worked for The New York Times for 22 years, serving as creative director for The New York Times Magazine, as well as T: The New York Times Style Magazine. As art director at The New York Times, she was involved in the development of the New York Times Magazine cover illustration that led to the "Tribute in Light" memorial to the September 11, 2001 terrorist attack in New York City. Also during her time as art director at the Times, she decided to use a controversial photo of photographer and breast-cancer survivor Matuschka to illustrate a story on the politics of breast cancer. The cover photo, which ran in 1993, sparked controversy due to its graphic nature.

She was creative director at Real Simple magazine from 2009-2014.

== Awards ==
Froelich's work has appeared in the annuals of the AIGA, the Type Directors Club, Graphis, Print, American Photography and American Illustration. She has been featured in Print Magazine, where she was interviewed by Steven Heller, as well as Creative Review.

In 2006, Froelich was inducted into the Art Directors Hall of Fame. She has also been honored by Hall of Femmes, an organization that highlights the work of women in art direction and design. Hall of Femmes also published Hall of Femmes: Janet Froelich, focused on Froelich featuring an interview and examples of her work. Froelich's career in graphic design was part of Women of Design: Influence And Inspiration From The Original Trailblazers To The New Groundbreakers (HOW Books 2009 ISBN 1600610854)
