= Joan Does Dynasty =

1986 short film by Joan Braderman

- Directed by: Joan Braderman; with Manuel DeLanda
- Written by: Joan Braderman
- Produced by: Joan Braderman; Paper Tiger Television
- Starring: Joan Braderman
- Distributed by: Women Make Movies
- Release date: 1986
- Running time: 32 minutes
- Country: United States

Joan Does Dynasty (A Neopagan, Postsituationist, Socialist/Anarcho/Feminist Expose) is a 1986 short film written, produced, and performed by video artist Joan Braderman. The video was directed by Braderman with her then-partner Manuel DeLanda. It is not only a send-up of prime time soap-operas of the period, but also a skewering of the Reaganesque excesses of 80's popular culture in the U.S., examining the ways in which such iconic shows and other pop cultural objects functioned both as objects of desire and disgust.

== Synopsis ==
Joan Does Dynasty is a comedic dissection of the classic television drama Dynasty. In order to educate her audience, Braderman superimposes her body onto illustrative scenes from several episodes, including "A Little Girl" (s04e16), "Steps" (s04e19), and "The Verdict" (s05e06). While the footage plays, Braderman performs a monologue that interrogates the style of the show, its characters, and plot points, as well as critiquing the show's representation of femininity, power, ethnicity, and consumerism.

== Production ==
Braderman created the video in 1986 with the open media collective Paper Tiger Television. In a research paper about Jewish second-wave feminism, Melissa Raphael, professor of Jewish theology at the University of Gloucestershire, quotes Braderman for reflecting on the female characters of Dynasty:

These campy [TV] creatures have been interceding in my key personal relations for several years now. I assigned myself to watch the show, to see how the thing works. Why do a hundred million people in 78 countries welcome this department store of dressed-to-kill aliens in their homes every week?

Braderman's monologue was shot in front of a series of bluescreens, using mattes such as Mexican wrestling masks and dancing teardrops. These images from the shows were mixed with Braderman's performance of her original script, creating what Bob Reilly of the San Francisco Museum of Modern Art calls "the post-scratch chroma-key switcher effects [Braderman] made famous."

== Reception ==
As soon as it premiered on Paper Tiger TV, the film was screened at many art venues, including the 1987 Whitney Biennial, the Edinburgh Film Festival, the Museum of Modern Art in New York City, the Stedelijk in Amsterdam, the Georges Pompidou Center, Paris, The Institute of Contemporary Art, London, and the Vienna International Film Festival.

Village Voice critic Jim Hoberman said the film was "one of the two most impressive tapes in the video section of the 1987 Whitney Biennial". Art curator Bob Reily remarked that: "few have matched the technique, bravery and humor of Joan Does Dynasty". Political theorist Philip Green called the film a "wonderfully provocative video", and feminist columnist Susan J. Douglas called it "a provocative and hilarious feminist analysis of Dynasty, including the catfight!"

Cultural critic and feminist art historian Lisa E. Bloom wrote:

Though Braderman might critique the ways that Alexis strategically deploys tropes of a traditional femininity as a means to obtain power ... the artist also identifies with Alexis as an example of an older woman who is sexual (something rare on network television), has younger boyfriends, and knows how to tell off the men.

While some critics welcomed Braderman's "mixture of contempt and glee" in her treatment of Dynasty, others claimed that her fascination/repulsion with the show served in part, to reproduce the themes she attempted to deconstruct. But Norwegian media scholar Jostein Gripsrud said the film was "a truly remarkable piece of what [Braderman] calls 'stand-up theory," and filmmaker Yvonne Rainer asserted that the film "has become the classic feminist performance video of the era". The film has become a standard for college course syllabi in video art, media theory and video and film production courses.
