= Joan Braderman =

American video artist, director, performer and writer

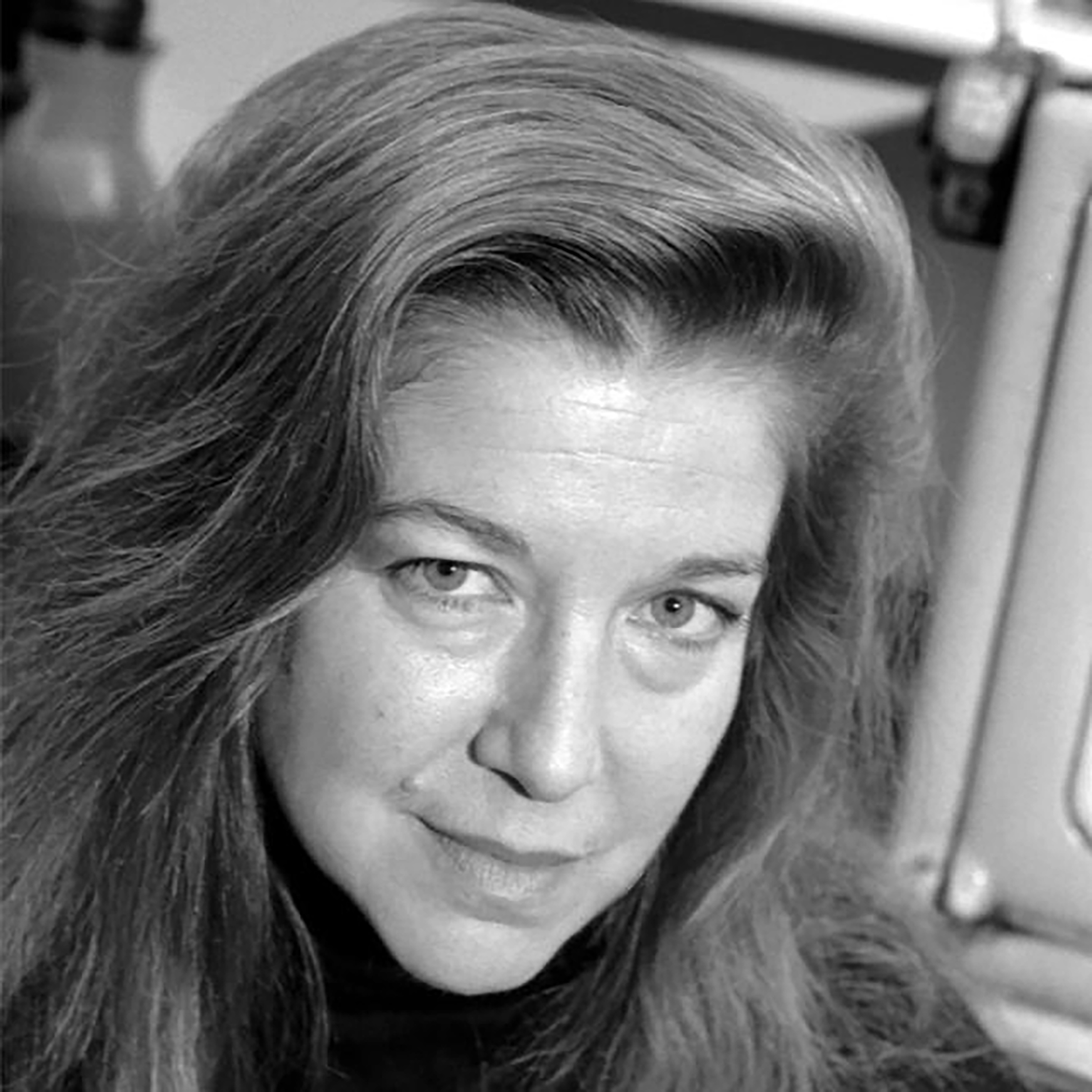
- Born: September 21, 1948; Washington, D.C., U.S.
- Died: July 4, 2025 (aged 76); Northampton, Massachusetts, U.S.
- Known for: Video artist, writer, performer
- Notable work: The Heretics, Joan Does Dynasty, Joan Sees Stars

Joan Braderman (1948–2025) is an American video artist, director, performer, and writer. Braderman's video works are considered to have created her signature style known as "stand up theory." Via this "performative embodiment," she deconstructs and analyzes popular media by inserting chroma-keyed cut-outs of her own body into appropriated mass media images, where she interrogates the representation of ideology (such as money, race and gender) and the transparency of photographic space in U.S. popular culture.

== Early life and education ==
Joan Braderman was born in Washington, DC, to parents Betty and Eugene Braderman.

Braderman attended Harvard University, graduating in 1970 with a BA cum laude where she recalls being the only woman in her filmmaking class. In 1971, she entered graduate school at New York University. Braderman's studies began with a focus on 16mm filmmaking. Once in New York City, she studied Cinema Studies, the new graduate department at NYU, but her focus moved on to video art production. She was taught by friends, comrades, and by herself at the free Media Access Centers which could be found in New York state at this time. Throughout the 1970s, Braderman was an anti-war, feminist and civil rights activist, involved in various political organizations. She received her MA from New York University in 1973, and a Masters of Philosophy in 1976.

=== Personal life ===
Braderman was first married to her work partner, Manuel DeLanda in 1980. She was then married to Robert C. Reckman in 1996. Reckman is a design-builder and co-founder of Construct Associates in Northampton, Massachusetts. He hoped to convince her to remain in Northampton, where he was part of building the town's renaissance. She left New York City and accepted a job at Hampshire College in the well-known Film, Video and Photo Program there.

=== Career ===
Braderman is a Professor Emerita of Video, Film and Media Studies at Hampshire College. She has taught internationally at institutions such as The School of Visual Arts in New York City, School of the Museum of Fine Arts in Boston, the Nova Scotia College of Art and Design, The Hartford University Art School, The Media School at The University of the Arts, London, and the Universidad catolica portuguesa in Porto, Portugal.

She is president of the small video/film company No More Nice Girls Productions. She has served on the board of directors of Planned Parenthood of Massachusetts as well as other feminist organizations such as the Committee for Abortion Rights and Against Sterilization Abuse, NYC. She also served on the boards of film and television organizations including the Association of Independent Film and Videomakers (AIVF), publisher of The Independent; The Independent Television Service (ITVS), and others. Braderman worked with several mass organizations for coalition building and shared electoral work for local progressive politicians such as Jose Rivera. In the Coalition for a Peoples Alternative, she had worked with Rivera on organizing the "Peoples' Convention" in 1980 to advocate for affordable housing, and a variety of other issues for which progressives had been fighting. The Convention temporarily reclaimed 12 burnt-out blocks of the South Bronx at Charlotte Street in NYC where they built their own "White House" and Peoples' Park. There, 5,000 delegates from all over the country including Puerto Rico, camped and conducted their plenary sessions in a huge tent on the site.

Braderman is a founding member of Heresies: A Feminist Publication on Art and Politics, a magazine produced by a collective of feminist artists and writers to publish work by women in the arts that ran from 1977 to 1993. She wrote and directed her film about the collective, titled The Heretics, in which 24 artists spoke about the times they shared on the project challenging established notions of gender and power. The Heretics was premiered in a solo screening at the Museum of Modern Art in New York in 2009, where it ran for a week.

=== Film, video and writing ===
Braderman's work appears in numerous international permanent collections:

- The Stedelijk Museum, Amsterdam
- The Museum of Modern Art, New York City
- DeCordova Museum and Sculpture Park: Lincoln, Massachusetts
- Institute of Contemporary Art, London
- Centre Georges Pompidou, Paris
- Pacific Film Archive: Berkeley, CA
- Harvard University Cinematheque: Cambridge, MA
- San Francisco Museum of Modern Art
- Museo Nacional Centro de Arte Reina Sofía, Madrid
- Wexner Center for the Arts: Columbus, OH
- Walker Art Center: Minneapolis, MN

=== Selected grants and fellowships ===
- Honored in 2013 as One of the Best 10 Female Filmmakers in the US by the Documentary Channel March 2013, when it was featured in "Her Take", showcasing documentaries by female filmmakers, a series videos and films, one by each honoree.
- National Endowment for the Arts; Individual Artist Grant, 1989
- Bay Area Video Coalition MediaMaker of the Year Award for 2009
- Hewllett – Mellon Foundation (1987, 1990, 1992, 1995, 1997, 1999, 2001–2007)
- MacArthur Foundation (1998 and 2004)
- Fulbright Foundation Chair in Electronic Arts, Porto, Portugal (2002)
- Lemelson Foundation (1994, 1998)
- Wexner Center for the Arts, Visiting Artist (January & August 1993, Summer 1998)
- Koopman Chair in the Visual Arts, Hartford Art School, University of Hartford (1996–97)
- New York State Council on the Arts (1989, 1992, 1994, 1996)
- The New England Fellowships Program through the NEA & the American Film Institute (1989)
- The Jerome Foundation (1987–88)
- New York Foundation for the Arts (1987–88)
- Nova Scotia College of Art and Design Fellow (1979)

== Video and film works ==
Natalie Didn't Drown – Joan Braderman ‘Reads’ The National Enquirer (1983) 28 min, colour.
Braderman's first video to be released and reviewed appeared on NYC Paper Tiger Television in 1983. It features the artist performing a monologue that satirizes the popular tabloid The National Enquirer, interwoven with collaged chromakey images from the magazine itself. Braderman began developing the video after the founder of Paper Tiger TV, Dee Dee Halleck, dared her to slander the editor of the tabloid. Natalie Didn't Drown debuted Braderman's style, delivering her "one woman lunatic performance," later dubbed "Stand-Up Theory". Natalie Didn't Drown was originally broadcast on Paper Tiger TV and shown at the 1984 American Film Institute Video Olympics.
Joan Does Dynasty (1986) 31 min, colour.
In Joan Does Dynasty, Braderman "offers a comic deconstruction of this hour of U.S. TV; unpacking, on video, some tropes of the most successful and iconic nighttime soap operas of the eighties," through using blue-screened cut-outs of her own body and voice to foreground the techniques used in the dominant media production. Her voice and visual commentary in this work represent gender and class as if they are natural and transparent states of being. She collaborated with Manuel De Landa on the effects for which they became famous. Joan Does Dynasty is considered "the most widely distributed feminist video ever made". Joan Does Dynasty's history of exhibition includes the 1987 Whitney Biennial, the Museum of Modern Art, the American Film Institute's National Video Festival, the Edinburgh International Film Festival, and the Austria Viennale. The piece is screened regularly in the syllabuses of courses in video theory and production nationwide.
No More Nice Girls (1989) 44 min, colour.
Braderman's No More Nice Girls, comments on the artist's lived experience in her community of feminist scholars and artists. The work alternates between fiction and autobiography, following the personal and political lives of multiple female protagonists. No More Nice Girls premiered at The Collective for Living Cinema in New York in 1989 and won first prize at the Daniel Wadsworth National Video Festival in 1990.
30 Second Spot Reconsidered: For A Bicentennial Without Colonies (1989) 11min, colour.
30 Second Spot Reconsidered: For A Bicentennial Without Colonies is taken from the true story of the artist in the 1970s when she attempted to purchase network time on broadcast television to advertise counter-bicentennial activities. The video demonstrates how censorship is embedded in the corporate systems that govern broadcast television. 30 Second Spot Reconsidered: For A Bicentennial Without Coloniesis distributed through the Video Data Bank. It won the Critic's Choice Award from The Boston Globe in 1990.
Joan Sees Stars (1993) 60 min, colour.
Reminiscent of Joan Does Dynasty, Braderman uses editing techniques to insert herself into scenes from popular Hollywood films. Her interaction with the image raises questions about the American fascination with celebrity, and how gender operates in Hollywood film. Joan Sees Stars focuses on the representation of Elizabeth Taylor and other Hollywood divas. The film was co-directed by Dana Master.
Video Bites: Framed (1998–1999) 24min, colour
Framed is the second installment of the longer piece, Video Bites. It is in current distribution. Video Bites: Framed offers a series of visual metaphors for the ubiquity of the "frame" in contemporary life through using her trademark chroma-key in a new way. Braderman frames and juxtaposes exterior landscapes as well as details or close-ups. The piece premiered at PANDEMONIUM, FESTIVAL FOR MOVING IMAGES, London, where it won the Audience Award in October 1998. It showed at such venues as The Carpenter Center for the Visual Arts at Harvard; "Film Series" at Ithaca College, 1999 and Boston Women in Film at Tufts University in 2000.
Para No Olvidar: Los Calles de mi Habana viejo (2004) 6 min, digital, color, sound.
A video collage of Old Havana streets, which was seen on the website of the Office of the City of Havana, the organisation responsible for rebuilding the old city. The piece now occupies a place in the Office's permanent collection.
The Heretics (2009)
Written and directed by Braderman, The Heretics, described as an experimental documentary, is an exploration of the Heresies Collective and Braderman's first feature film. The Heresies Collective is a feminist art group established in 1976 by Braderman, alongside 20 other founding members. The Heretics offers an inside look at one of the thousands of collectives working during the second wave of the feminist movement; it was produced by Crescent Diamond.

The Heretics was shot in 24p mini-dv video. It incorporates interview footage with still images, 3D animation, archival footage, artworks, and staged scenes where young actresses play the roles of collective members. The collage style of the film intentionally recalls the diversity of experience within the feminist art world in the late 1970s and 1980s, as well as the visuals of the Heresies issues themselves. The original soundtrack, primarily created by guitarist and producer June Millington, likewise draws from collage practices. Millington first found success in the all-woman rock band, Fanny, the first group of women rock' n' rollers to sign a recording contract with a major studio. Having played guitar for Chris Williamson, Holly Near, and others, she is considered one of the "godmothers of Women's Music, so she was an especially appropriate choice to create the soundtrack for The Heretics. When she heard the film was in post-production, she tracked down Braderman in her studio, watched the rough-cut for 10 minutes and said, 'All of your music needs were just resolved'."

The documentary employs digital motion graphics to "extend the aesthetics of the magazine into the digital realm and onto the screen." Much of the film consists of interviews with twenty-eight of the collective members, who re-visit what the collective meant to them and the memories they have of the Collective and the Second Wave of the Women's Movement. The plot is semi-autobiographical, following Braderman's first person account as she arrives in New York City in 1971 and is introduced to the arts culture of lower Manhattan at the time. However, the narrative format is used largely as a framing device. Braderman does not focus on any one of the women, but rather makes the feminist movement itself the focus of her film. This allows the structure of the film to reflect the non-hierarchical structure of the collective, where, ideally, no one woman is valued above the others. The film's relationship to the past has been described as celebratory and nostalgic.

In order to shoot the film, Braderman travelled internationally, re-connecting with former collective members now living in widely different locations around the world. The film was shot in Carboneras, Spain; Santa Fe, New Mexico; Northampton, Massachusetts; Portland, Maine; Venice, Italy; San Francisco, California, and New York City. The former collective members featured in the film include Emma Amos, Ida Applebroog, Mary Beth Edelson, Su Friedrich, Janet Froelich, Harmony Hammond, Joyce Kozloff, Lucy Lippard, Amy Sillman, Susana Torre, Cecelia Vecunia, and Nina Yankowitz.

The film is celebrated for its spirited and affirmative look at a period of feminist revolution and great social change. One male reviewer criticized Braderman's direction, claiming the documentary makes "vague" statements about inequality. The Heretics has been remarkably well-received on the whole, garnering positive reviews online and in print publications such as The New York Times, The Washington Post, The Village Voice and Artforum.

=== Documentaries ===
July 4, 1976 (1977) 20 min., 3/4-inch, NTSC, BW.
The Coalition requested footage from a full range of the groups (housing, labor, childcare, Puerto Rican solidarity and organizing on the island itself, The Black Panthers, anti-nuclear activists, reproductive and LGBT rights, which had participated in the July 4, 1976 counter-bicentennial march in North Philadelphia. After receiving footage from many of the independent groups which had participated in the March and Rally in Philadelphia, the July 4 Coalition team created a collage of these elements to represent the way the Coalition was uniting the individual groups into their ideal organization of a national united front.This collaborative piece was edited (at free Cable Access facilities) from images shot by individual producers in groups all over the country, who were documenting the principal organizing activities of their own work at home. It was created to resonate with the experience of the March in North Philadelphia as well as to help inspire more joint community and electoral work together to build national strength by bringing the separate struggles together to learn from each other and experience first hand, the underlying connections among them.
The People's Convention, South Bronx (1980) 18 min, 3/4-inch, NTSC, colour.
Braderman produced the video; Lillian Jimenez line- produced and directed on-site, and Jose Rivera, soon to be elected councilman of this area, collected footage from TV stations throughout the city to reconstruct these events. Mike D'Elia was the editor, using the many hours of footage shot and assembled by an agitprop group, formed for this purpose. This piece documented the legendary Peoples' Convention which took place on 12 square blocks of the infamous area known as the "Charlotte St." area of the South Bronx. This nightmare urban landscape was first burnt down illegally by landlords. It was then cleared every Saturday for months by a group of volunteers from the host group of construction workers in the Bronx, "United Tremont Trades," and other city progressives. "The Peoples' Convention," was a gathering of thousands of people from around the country who spent several nights in "Peoples Park" and participated in caucuses attended by a wide array of activists. Among attending organizations were those working to get fair housing for low income families; against racism and for reproductive and civil rights, voting rights, environmentalists, LGBT activists; prison reform and Puerto Rican independence. At Conventions' end, thousands of participants marched downtown to the Democratic Convention in Madison Square Garden, where people Like Jimmy Carter and other politicians) who had made promises to rebuild in the South Bronx, met at their convention, the DNC. The video was shown widely for organizing participating groups across the country and is still posted on Rivera's Facebook and YouTube.The convention's main slogan, "Too many years of Broken Promises; now we will be heard," was memorialized in this video and many years later, the South Bronx was to begin to rebuild.
Waiting for the Invasion – U.S. Citizens in Nicaragua (1984) 28 min, 3/4-inch, NTSC, colour
Directed by Dee Dee Halleck, Co-Produced with Skip Blumberg, Joel Kovel, Karen Ranucci and edited by Shu Lea Cheang, this documentary program offers a bit of historical material on the history of US invasions in the area but mainly focuses on the Nicaraguan Revolution and the Contra War against it.in the atmosphere of enthusiasm and preparation that existed among young citizens in the time following Regan’s invasion of Grenada. This story is told by following a diverse group of U.S. citizens through their lives and work in Nicaragua (as teachers, agriculturists, retail sales people, nurses and factory workers as part of the young "Sandinista" revolution). These North Americans are there for a variety reasons, NOT including the desire to be "rescued" by the US military as the scenario had gone a year before on the island of Grenada, home of the revolutionary "New Jewel Movement," under the leadershop of Maurice Bishop.We see images of the young Nicaraguan revolution's citizens digging trenches in their backyards to prepare for a possible "next invasion" by the conservative government of Ronald Reagan.

'Waiting for the Invasion won Best Documentary at Global Village Documentary Festival in New York City in 1984. and was seen, among many other venues, on KCET ""Presente series and other PBS stations nationally.

Tell Them For Us; Madre in Nicaragua (1985) 28 min, colour.
Braderman co-produced and edited this documentary with CBS News cameraperson Jane Lurie. Tell Them For Us; Madre in Nicaragua focuses on a diverse group of American female members of the organization MADRE, as they travel within Nicaragua to learn about the effects of the conflict. Tell Them For Us was screened in the U.S. House of Representatives.

=== No More Nice Girls Productions ===
Braderman's non-profit production company is located in Northampton, Massachusetts. The company produces all of Braderman's video/film works, multimedia works, web sites and web series for online, TV, home video and gallery distribution.

The No More Nice Girls mandate expresses an investment in allowing artists to secure freedom of speech through access to the medium of video and internet. They aim to produce and distribute analytical, intelligent film that prioritizes multiple subjectivities and envisions a democratic future.

The company includes a facilities cooperative and a screening space, as well as community outreach programming. Other members include Dana Master, Stashu Kybartas and Crescent Diamond.

== Themes ==
Braderman's work engages with ideas about female identity. A common theme in her work is a critical look at the production of media and popular culture, including the unforgiving representation of women in these spaces. Braderman has stated: "my work has been about creating alternative representations of dominant rhetorical categories such as woman, sexuality, space, or politics."

Braderman's work engages with feminist art histories of collage, combining the medium with irony and black humour. Braderman's work also invests in producing a record of a women's movement that threatens, via a variety of forms of backlash against it, to disappear from history.

== Writing ==
Braderman was a founding member of the Heresies Collective, which published from 1977 to 1992, during the second wave of feminism. During the 1970s she contributed to the feminist journal as a member of the publishing collective as well as with writing and editing of two issues of the magazine.

Braderman has written original scripts for all of her own produced works. as well as several yet unproduced pieces. She also wrote script materials for Manuel DeLanda's experimental works in film such as, "Raw Nerves; A Lacanian Thriller" (1980). She has written critically about issues of representation in film and video, popular vs. "high" art, ideas of utopia, critique and redefinition of the so-called "documentary" film as well as women in film, feminism and the Women's movement and popular, avant-garde and non-fiction films and videos. Her essays include Feminism and Video: A View From The Village,"Camera Obscura; Archive for the Future", The First International Festival of Films by Women, Artforum, September 1972. Reclaiming the Utopian Movement, "Paper Tiger Television", and Feminism, the individual and what's left: "Heresies: A Feminist Publication on Art and Politics" Issue 1, Number 1, 1977."

== Reception ==
Braderman's work has been reviewed widely. Notable reviews have been included in publications such as The Guardian (London), The New York Times, The Village Voice, Artforum, The Independent, The Washington Post, and Art Journal. Her work is currently distributed by: The Video Data Bank at the Art Institute of Chicago; Women Make Movies; LUX; and The Danish Broadcasting Corporation. Braderman was previously distributed by Paper Tiger Television until its archives were donated to Deep Dish Television and the NYU Libraries.
