= Harmony Hammond =

American artist, curator, and writer

- Born: February 8, 1944 (age 82); Hometown, Illinois, US
- Movement: Feminist art movement
- Website: harmonyhammond.com

Harmony Hammond (born February 8, 1944) is an American artist, activist, curator, and writer. She was a prominent figure in the founding of the feminist art movement in 1970s New York.

== Early life and education ==
Harmony Hammond was born on February 8, 1944, in Hometown, Illinois. At 17, Hammond attended Miliken University in Decatur, Illinois. Later, she moved to Minneapolis and enrolled at the University of Minnesota. Hammond graduated with a B.A. in painting in 1967.

== Career ==
Hammond and her husband moved to New York in 1969. When Hammond found out she was pregnant with her daughter, she and her husband decided to separate. In 1973, Hammond came out as a lesbian.

Harmony Hammond co-founded the A.I.R. Gallery in 1972; it was the first women's cooperative art gallery in New York. She also co-founded Heresies: A Feminist Publication of Art and Politics in 1976, co-edited issues #1, 3 and 9, and published articles in seven issues. Heresies was founded by Heresies Collective, whose core group consisted of Joyce Kozloff, Miriam Schapiro, Joan Semmel, Lucy R. Lippard, Mary Beth Edelson, Nancy Spero, and Harmony Hammond. She was an instructor at the New York Feminist Art Institute.

Hammond curated A Lesbian Show in 1978 at 112 Greene Street Workshop, featuring works by lesbian artists. She was one of the featured artists in the Great American Lesbian Art Show at the Woman's Building in 1980. In 1981, Hammond curated and exhibited her work in Home Work: The Domestic Environment As Reflected in the Work of Women Artists, sponsored by the New York State Council on the Arts and the National Women's Hall of Fame. She also curated an exhibition in 1999 at Plan B Evolving Arts in Santa Fe, New Mexico, titled Out West, bringing together 41 2SLGBT artists from the Southwestern United States.

Hammond authored her first book, Wrappings: Essays on Feminism, Art, and the Martial Arts, a corpus of her writings from 1973 to 1983 published by TSL Press, in 1984. In 2000 she published Lesbian Art in America: A Contemporary History. She is featured in two 2010 films on feminist art: The Heretics, directed by Joan Braderman, which focuses on the founders of the magazine Heresies in 1976; and !Women Art Revolution, directed by Lynn Hershman Leeson.

In 1984, she moved to New Mexico. As a professor, Hammond taught painting, combined media, and graduate critiques at the University of Arizona in Tucson from 1988 to 2005. Hammond continues to teach workshops and writes, curates, and lectures on feminist, lesbian, and queer art.

== Works ==
The Meeting of Passion and Intellect (1981) at the National Gallery of Art in 2022

In her art, Hammond asserts that traditionally feminine qualities are worthwhile artistic subjects and means for artistic creation. To this end, for example, she created sculptures in the early 1970s featuring swaths of fabric as a primary material. There were four fabric series: Bags (1971), Presences (1972), Floorpieces (1973), and Wrapped Sculptures (1977–1984). Her paintings themselves tend to show how they were made and are almost all abstract. In the 1990s Hammond primarily made mixed-media installations that incorporated a range of traditionally non-art materials (such as human hair and corrugated roofing) with traditional oil painting, and in the first decade of the 2000s, her focus was on making monochrome abstract paintings.

=== Presences ===
Presences was a series of works created in 1971–1972. It was her first major series. Seven of these pieces are included in her Material Witness collection. These artworks are fabric scraps soaked in paint, densely sewn together and on a hanger strung from the ceiling. Presences was presented at Hammond's first solo exhibition in New York in 1973. The fabric is all different lengths with some strips being layered or tied together to be longer. "Six fabric sculptures appearing slightly larger than life size hang from the ceiling and graze the floor [...] Paint applied by artist Harmony Hammond imparts earthy tones to these layered scraps of cloth. Spots of bright color and pattern peek out here and there". Hammond's intention behind the works was to capture the history of women being creative and claiming space. Most of the fabric scraps used to create the pieces in the Presences series were sourced from members of a women's group with whom Hammond was involved.

=== Floorpieces ===
In 1973, Hammond created a series of artworks titled Floorpieces. Hammond created these rugs through a traditional braiding style with colorful fabric she had found in dumpsters in New York's Garment District. The rags were then painted selectively with acrylic pigment and were displayed on the ground like rugs. Most of Hammond's Floorpieces are approximately 5 ft. (1.5 m) in diameter and almost 2 in. (5 cm) thick. Hammond's Floorpieces challenges the binary between art and craft; they also continue her exploration of the space between painting and sculpture. The creation of the Floorpieces coincided with Hammond coming out as a lesbian.

=== Near monochromes ===
Throughout the 1990s and early 2000s, Hammond's work began to include fewer sculptural elements, taking on more traditionally painterly forms and focusing more heavily on partially hidden forms beneath layers of paint. Regarding the evolution of her work, Hammond stated: "Over the years, the paintings have gotten simpler, more condensed, with fewer materials in any given piece." The works include materials such as "straps, grommets, bandage-like strips of cloth, or rough burlap patches with fraying edges and pronounced seams."

== Recognition ==
Hammond has had more than 40 solo exhibitions internationally. Her works have been shown in the Tucson Museum of Art, Los Angeles Museum of Contemporary Art, Gemeentemuseum Den Haag, Vancouver Art Gallery, National Academy Museum, and Museo Tamayo. Her works are also included in permanent collections in the Metropolitan Museum of Art, the Walker Art Center, the Brooklyn Museum, the National Museum of Women in the Arts, the Art Institute of Chicago, and the New Mexico Museum of Art.

She has received fellowships from the National Endowment for the Arts, the John Simon Guggenheim Memorial Foundation, the Adolph and Esther Gottlieb Foundation, and the Pollock-Krasner Foundation, among others. In 2014, Hammond was one of the 2014 recipients of the Women's Caucus for Art Lifetime Achievement Award. Her papers were acquired by the Getty Research Institute, Los Angeles, in 2016.

Harmony Hammond: Material Witness, Five Decades of Art, Hammond's first comprehensive museum survey, took place at The Aldrich Contemporary Art Museum in Ridgefield, Connecticut, in 2019. The exhibit traveled to the Sarasota Art Museum in Florida in 2020. The exhibit was accompanied by the first hardcover monograph written on Hammond's work, with an essay by the exhibit's curator, Amy Smith-Stewart.

Hammond's work was included in the 2021 exhibition Women in Abstraction at the Centre Pompidou. Her work was included in the 2024 exhibition Making Their Mark: Works from the Shah Garg Collection at the Berkeley Art Museum and Pacific Film Archive.

== Notable works in public collections ==
- Hug (1978); Whitney Museum of American Art
- Durango (1979); Art Institute of Chicago
- Hunkertime (1980); Brooklyn Museum
- The Meeting of Passion and Intellect (1981); National Museum of Women in the Arts
- Radiant Affection (1983–1984); Metropolitan Museum of Art
- Chicken Lady (1989); Minneapolis Institute of Art
- Tiny Aperture #3 (2013); Leslie-Lohman Museum of Art

== Publications ==
- Wrappings: Essays on Feminism, Art, and the Martial Arts. New York: TSL Press. 1984. ISBN 9780939858057.
- Lesbian Art in America: A Contemporary History. New York: Rizzoli. 2000. ISBN 9780847822485.
