= ALIMUPER =

Accion para la Liberacion de la Mujer Peruana (ALIMUPER, Action for the Liberation of Peruvian Women) was a Peruvian feminist organization active in the 1970s.

== History ==
ALIMUPER was founded in 1973, by Ana Maria Portugal. Its members were mostly from the educated middle classes. The organization shared a small office with Creatividad y Cambio, a Catholic feminist organization founded by two Maryknoll Sisters, Rosa Dominga and Timotea.

ALIMUPER organized demonstrations against Mother's Day being commercialized, and for the right to contraception and abortion. In 1978 it organized a march supporting the Nicaraguan Revolution. ALIMUPER called a march for abortion rights on International Women's Day 1979. Few women attended, and some who did voiced uncertainty whether it was appropriate to publicly demonstrate on the issue in a country "torn between hunger and misery". Coordinating with a London-based international movement that year, it also demanded the government sponsor programmes for abused women.

In 1980 ALIMUPER and Creatividad y Cambio moved to a new building, Casa de la Mujer, which they shared with CMP Flora Tristán. ALIMUPER demonstrated against Miss Universe 1982, which was held in Lima. However, it disbanded soon afterwards, facing some internal problems and aware that consciousness-raising groups were losing ground to activist centres working with a wider social 'base'.
