= Pat Steir =

American painter and printmaker (1938–2026)

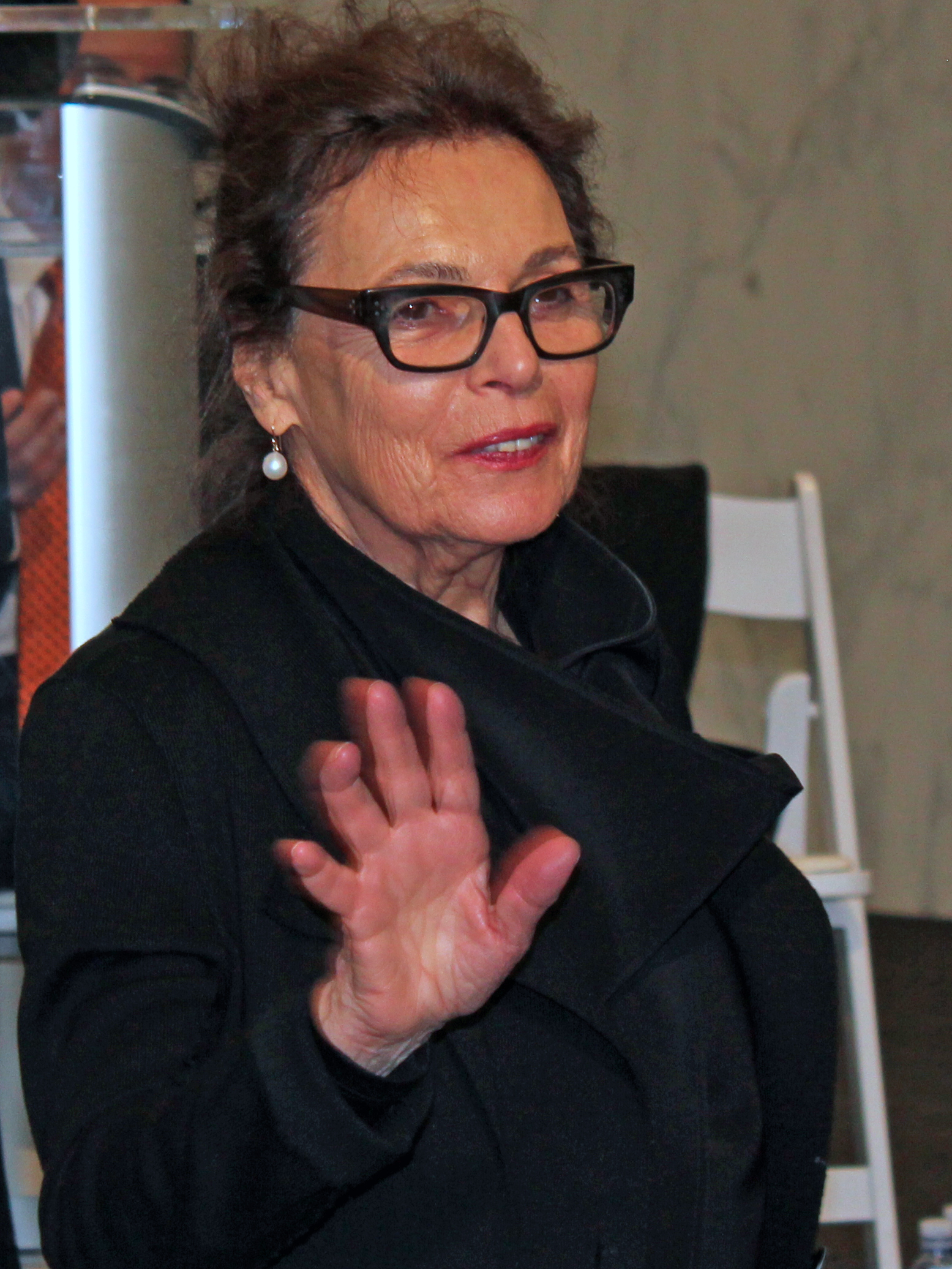
- Steir in 2014
- Born: Iris Patricia Sukoneck; April 10, 1938; Newark, New Jersey, U.S.
- Died: March 25, 2026 (aged 87); New York City, U.S.
- Education: Pratt Institute; Boston University College of Fine Arts
- Known for: Painting, printmaking
- Awards: Guggenheim Fellowship (1982); Pratt Institute honorary doctorate (1991); Boston University Distinguished Alumni Award (2001); Pratt Institute Alumni Achievement Award (2008)

Iris Patricia Steir (née Sukoneck; April 10, 1938 – March 25, 2026) was an American painter and printmaker. Her early work was loosely associated with conceptual art and minimalism, however, she was best known for her abstract dripped, splashed and poured "Waterfall" paintings, which she started in the 1980s, and for her later site-specific wall drawings.

Steir had retrospectives and exhibitions all over the world, including the Tate Gallery in London, and shows at the Brooklyn Museum and the New Museum of Contemporary Art that traveled throughout Europe. She won numerous awards for her work, and is thoroughly represented in major museum collections in the United States and abroad, including the Metropolitan Museum of Art and the Museum of Modern Art in New York City and the Tate Gallery. She was a founding board member of Printed Matter bookshop in New York City, and of the landmark feminist journal, Heresies, first published in 1977. Steir also taught art at Parsons School of Design, Princeton University, and Hunter College. She lived and worked primarily in New York City as an adult. She lived in Greenwich Village.

== Early life and education ==
Steir was born Iris Patricia Sukoneck in Newark, New Jersey, on April 10, 1938 to Judith and Lawrence Sukoneck, owners of a window display company. She attended the Pratt Institute in New York (1956–1958), where she was influenced by her teachers Richard Lindner and Phillip Guston, and Boston University College of Fine Arts (1958–1960). Steir returned to Pratt and earned a BFA degree in 1962.

== Career ==
=== Early years ===
Pat Steir, Nothing, oil on canvas, 1974, Honolulu Museum of Art

In 1962, the year she graduated from art school, Steir was included in a group show at the High Museum of Art in Atlanta, Georgia. In 1964, her work was in a show called “Drawings” at the Museum of Modern Art in New York. Her first one-person exhibition was at the Terry Dintenfass Gallery, New York, in 1964. During that time, she worked in New York as an illustrator and a book designer (1962–1966). Between 1966–1969, Steir was an art director at Harper & Row publishing company, New York. Around 1970 she became friends with Sol LeWitt, Lawrence Weiner, and other conceptual artist, and she made the first of many trips to New Mexico to visit Agnes Martin. As a visiting artist she presented her work at The Nova Scotia College of Art and Design in Halifax Canada on April 2nd, 1975.

She rose to fame in the 1970s with monochromatic canvases of roses and other images that were X-ed out. The artist explained, "I wanted to destroy images as symbols. To make the image a symbol for a symbol. I had to act it out―make the image and cross it out. …no imagery, but at the same time endless imagery. Every nuance of paint texture worked as an image."

=== Mature work ===
Wind and Water, color soap ground aquatint with soap ground aquatint reversal, spit bite aquatint and drypoint, 1996.

Steir's first museum exhibition, in 1973 at the Corcoran Gallery of Art, Washington, D.C., marked the beginning of an artmaking life dense with painting exhibitions. She also made installation work (shown at Documenta IX, Kassel, Germany, in 1992) . In addition she was an important printmaker. Crown Point Press began publishing her prints in 1977 and in 1983 the Spencer Museum of Art, University of Kansas, gave her a print and drawing exhibition. A print retrospective at the Cabinet des Estampes in Geneva traveled to the Tate Gallery in London, England. Steir had one-person painting exhibitions at the Brooklyn Museum in 1984 and the New Museum of Contemporary Art in New York in 1987, both of which traveled to other museums, many in Europe.

In the late 1980s, Steir became influenced by the artists John Cage and Agnes Martin and began producing dripped, splashed, and poured works, embracing the element of chance. The artist related this work to the 8th and 9th century Chinese Yipin "ink-splashing" painters, having studied ink splash in the harmony of nature and humanity, inspired by Tibetan philosophy. Wind and Water is an example of this phase of her work. In 1989–92 Steir began limiting her colors to monochrome. In 1995, the monograph Pat Steir (LCCN 94-30546) was published by the American art critic Thomas McEvilley, chronicling the artist's life work up to that point. In November 1999, Steir was the subject of an Art in America cover feature, "Watercourse Way", by critic G. Roger Denson, who wrote that Steir's lyrical waterfall paintings attest to her long-standing interest in Asian art and thought, particularly the ancient Chinese philosophy of Daoism, with Steir's literal and figurative motif embodying the flow of water (or in her case, paint) down a surface.

Describing Steir's 2010 installation at Sue Scott Gallery, The Nearly Endless Line, which consisted of a white line snaking around the gallery's blue-black walls, lit with blue light, Sharon Butler writes in The Brooklyn Rail, "Walking through the darkened space, observers find themselves inside Steir’s painting, where they become part of the illusion she has created with paint and light." Pat Steir said "I wanted to be a great artist, again not in slang in someone who is great. But in the fantastic, reaching the soul of other people."

== Personal life and death ==
In 1956, she married Merle Steir but later divorced. She later married Joost Elffers, but kept the surname Steir. She died in Manhattan, New York, on March 25, 2026, at the age of 87.

== Awards ==
Steir received many public honors for her work. She was the recipient of Individual Artist (1973) and Art in Public Institutions (1976) grants from the National Endowment for the Arts, and was awarded a Guggenheim Fellowship for Fine Arts in 1982. Both of her alma maters have recognized her: Pratt, with an Honorary Doctorate of Fine Art (1991) and a 2008 Alumni Achievement Award for "outstanding graduates who have distinguished themselves in their fields", and Boston University, with a Distinguished Alumni Award (2001). In 2016, Steir was elected a member of the American Academy of Arts and Letters.

== Exhibitions ==
In a career spanning over fifty years, Steir exhibited at a large number of galleries and institutions, throughout the U.S. and internationally. Selected museums and institutions have held retrospectives and exhibitions of her work including: Musée d'art contemporain de Lyon (1990); the de Young Museum, San Francisco (2010-2011); and the Rhode Island School of Design Museum (2010). Silent Secret Waterfalls: The Barnes Series, Barnes Foundation, 2019. Pat Steir: Color Wheel, the Hirshhorn Museum and Sculpture Garden, 2019.

Her work was included in the 2024 exhibition Making Their Mark: Works from the Shah Garg Collection at the Berkeley Art Museum and Pacific Film Archive (BAMPFA).

== Collections ==
Steir's work is included in major public collections around the world, including: Metropolitan Museum of Art (New York City); Museum of Modern Art, Whitney Museum of American Art, National Gallery of Art (Washington, D. C.), Tate Gallery (London), Phoenix Art Museum (Phoenix, Arizona), and the San Francisco Museum of Modern Art,

== Bibliography ==
- Steir, Pat, Pat Steir paintings, New York, Abrams, 1986.
- Steir, Pat, Arbitrary Order, Paintings by Pat Steir, Contemporary Arts Museum, Houston, Texas, 1983.
- Steir, Pat, Dazzling Water, Dazzling Light, Seattle, University of Washington Press, 2000.
- McEvilley, Thomas, "Pat Steir", New York, Harry N. Abrams, 1995.
- Denson, G. Roger, "Watercourse Way," Art in America, November 1999, pp. 114–121, with a painting by Steir appearing on the front cover.
- Steir, Pat; Tóibín, Colm. Pat Steir: Paintings. Hauser & Wirth Publishers, 2025.
