= Philip Green (author) =

American political theorist (born 1932)

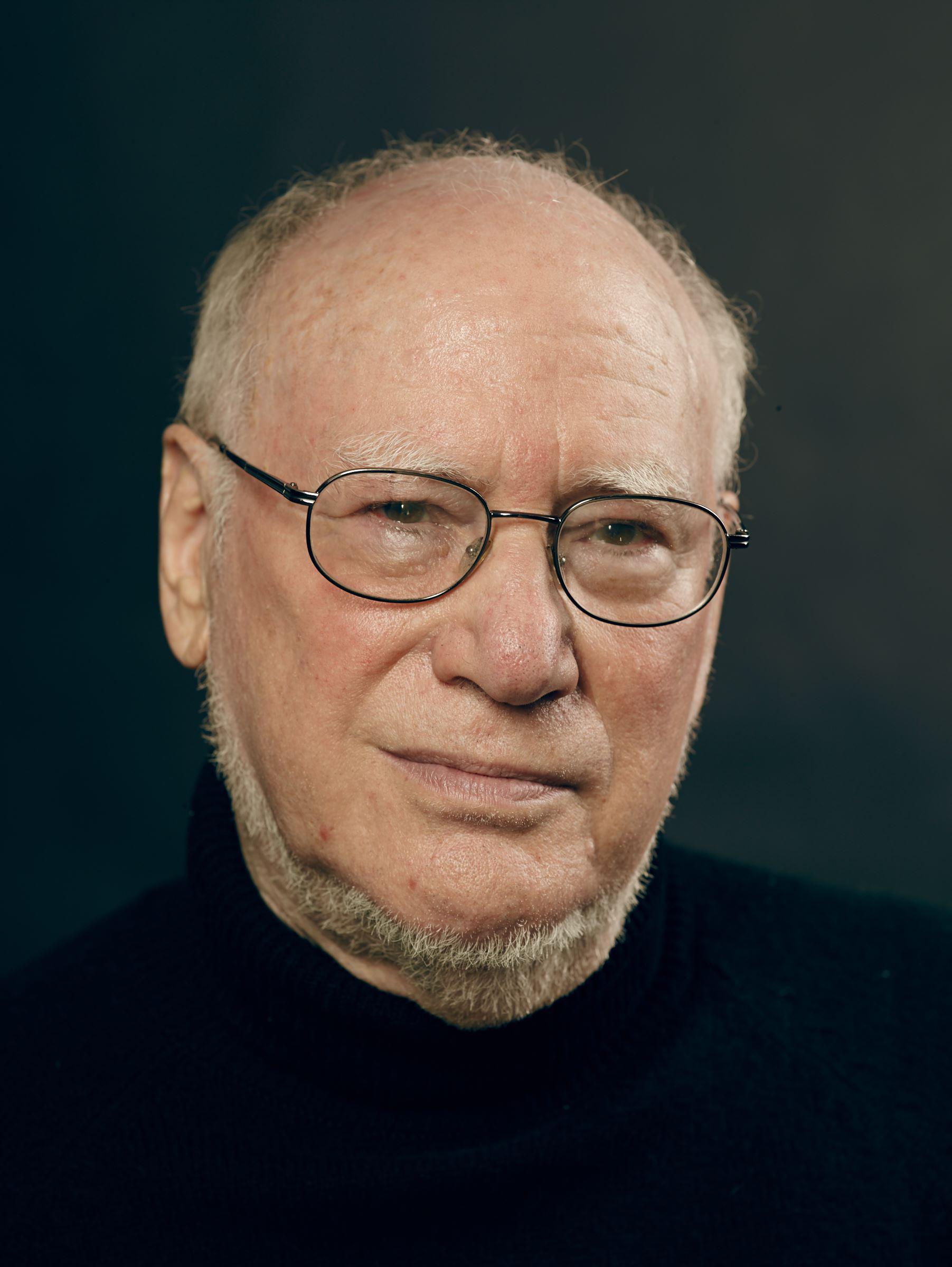
- Green in 2014
- Born: October 6, 1932 (age 93)

Philosophical work
- Era: Contemporary
- Region: Western democracies
- School: Critical Theory
- Main interests: democratic theory, American politics, feminism, mass media, modern political thought

Philip Green (born October 6, 1932) is an American political theorist and Sophia Smith Professor Emeritus of Smith College in Northampton, MA. An outspoken public intellectual, he is best known for his critiques of American liberal pluralism, beginning with a critique of American Cold War strategic policy based on massive nuclear deterrence and first-strike capability, to numerous recent writings about the retreat of representative democracy in the United States. His recent book, American Democracy: Selected Essays on Theory, Practice and Critique (2014), contains a compilation of many of those essays.

== Education ==
Green attended Swarthmore College in Swarthmore, PA, graduating with a BA in History (Magna cum laude) in 1954. He received a Master's in Public Administration from the Woodrow Wilson School of Public and International Affairs at Princeton University in Princeton, NY (1961), as well as a PhD in Politics at Princeton (1965).

== Career ==
Green taught political theory in the Government Department at Smith College from 1964–1998, and was a visiting professor at the New School Graduate Center in New York from 2000–2009. Early in his career, he taught at Princeton University and Haverford College.

In addition to his academic work, he has been a frequent contributor to public policy journals and magazines on topics ranging from affirmative action to anti-Semitism. He has served on the editorial board of The Nation since 1978, He was co-chair of the American Writer's Congress in New York in 1981, participated frequently in the Socialist Scholars Conference and its successor, the Left Forum. He is a founding member of the Caucus for a New Political Science within the American Political Science Association (APSA), and has appeared on numerous additional APSA panels.

== Views ==
In his first book, Deadly Logic: The Theory of Nuclear Deterrence (1966), Green criticized the allegedly scientific approach to the nuclear arms race advanced by strategic policy scholars and policymakers of the time. Their reliance on scientific solutions to nuclear escalation was, he argued, profoundly unscientific and inattentive to the deeper moral and political dimensions of the possibility of nuclear warfare. In a further development of that criticism in "Science, Government, and the Case of Rand: A Singular Pluralism" (World Politics 1968, reprinted in American Democracy, ch. 2), he pointed out that the story of the Rand Corporation's relationship to the theorists of nuclear deterrence gave lie to the conventional liberal pluralist notion that policy-setting in the U.S. was open to all would-be participants on an equal basis. The book and the essay were among the seminal critiques of liberal pluralism being developed out of the social and professional ferment of the 1960s. That essay was shortly followed by "I Have a Philosophy, You Have an Ideology: Is Social Criticism Possible?" (Massachusetts Review, 1971, reprinted in American Democracy, ch. 1), which argued that an appropriate respect for facts and reason distinguishes genuine philosophical or empirical argument from the illusions of ideological thinking.

Since that time, his writing has depended both politically and methodologically on these two foundations: the problems of liberal pluralism and the confusion of ideology with philosophical argument. His writing has ranged broadly across a variety of political issues, from advancing a feminist critique of mass culture (Cracks in the Pedestal: Ideology and Gender in Hollywood, 1998) to arguing in favor of open borders (American Democracy, ch. 7). In particular, his essay, "A Few Kind Words for Liberalism", which initially appeared in The Nation in 1992 (reprinted in American Democracy, ch. 5) calls attention to the opaque but critical relationship between radicalism and liberalism. He argues that although liberals too often stop short of genuine change, leaving valuable reforms in the lurch, radicals need to recognize the Millian element in liberalism, the defense of individual rights, group rights and human rights. Thus, he asserts, liberalism and radicalism are inextricably linked, as each not only reveals itself but also challenges the shortcomings and hypocrisies of the other. He concludes that "[t]he task for radicals ... is ... always to point out how much remains to be done after the latest bout of liberal reform, but not to treat liberalism as their primary enemy. It is not classical liberalism but rather a compromised and half-hearted version of it that makes supine compromises with political power brokers or corporate moneybags".

Throughout, as a theorist of democracy, Green has argued that the oligarchic and democratic elements of representative democracy are in constant tension (American Democracy, ch. 6); that a truly representative and accountable government must have input from participants at all levels of public life (Retrieving Democracy, 1985); and that representative democracy and modern capitalism—which deepens social inequalities and thus undermines the foundations of political equality—are fundamentally incompatible (Equality and Democracy, 1999). Pointing out that vibrant democracy must be continuously open to mass protest movements (American Democracy, ch. 11), he has argued that familiar defenses of social inequality are profoundly ideological and can only be overcome not by philosophy but by collective action (American Democracy, ch. 4). In addition, he has pointed out that pro-democracy movements are repeatedly undermined by the increasing concentration of mass media (Primetime Politics, 2005), and the unleashing of gigantic concentrations of wealth, as well as the tendency to institutionalize and contain democracy movements endemic in contemporary American politics (American Democracy, ch. 9). Finally, he asserts, true democracy is dependent upon a strong state for its protection, rather than the night-watchman state of free-market theorists (American Democracy, ch. 3).

== Honors and awards ==
- Charles A. McCoy Career Achievement Award, Caucus for a New Political Science (2002)
- Rockefeller Foundation Fellowship at Bellagio (1992)
- Rockefeller Foundation Fellowship Recipient, "Political Equality: Toward the Ideal of a Self-Governing Community" (1982)
- Visiting Fellow, Institute of Advanced Studies, Princeton University (1981–1982)
- National Endowment for the Humanities Fellow (1976–77)

== Personal ==
Green is married to Dorothy Green, with whom he lives in New York City. He has two children, Laura Green, an English professor and Department Chair at Northeastern University, and Robert Green, a film and internet producer.

His memoir, Taking Sides: a Memoir in Stories, is a nostalgic and ironic account of his personal, political, and intellectual development.

== Selected works ==
=== Books ===
- Green, Philip. (1966). Deadly Logic: The Theory of Deterrence. New York: Schocken Books.
- Green, Philip. (1981). The Pursuit of Inequality. New York: Pantheon Books.
- Green, Philip. (1985). Retrieving Democracy. Washington, DC: Rowman and Littlefield Publishers.
- Green, Philip. (1997). Cracks in the Pedestal: Ideology and Gender in Hollywood. Amherst, MA: University of Massachusetts Press.
- Green, Philip. (1999). Equality and Democracy. New York: The New Press.
- Green, Philip. (2005). Primetime Politics: The Truth about Conservative Lies, Corporate Culture, and Television Culture. Washington, DC: Rowman and Littlefield Publishers.
- Green, Philip. (2014). American Democracy: Selected Essays on Theory, Practice, and Critique. New York: Palgrave Macmillan.
- Green, Philip. (2015). Taking Sides: A Memoir in Stories. Amherst, MA: Levellers Press.

=== Edited books ===
- Green, Philip and Michael Walzer, eds. (1969) The Political Imagination in Literature: A Reader. New York: The Free Press.
- Green, Philip and Sanford Levinson, eds. (1970) Power and Community: Dissenting Essays in Political Science. New York: Pantheon Press.
- Green, Philip, ed. (1993, 2d ed. 1999) Democracy. New Jersey: Humanities Press.
- Green, Philip and Robert Benewick, eds. (1992, 2d ed. 1998) The Routledge Encyclopedia of Twentieth Century Political Thinkers. New York: Routledge Press.
