= Nina Yankowitz =

American visual artist

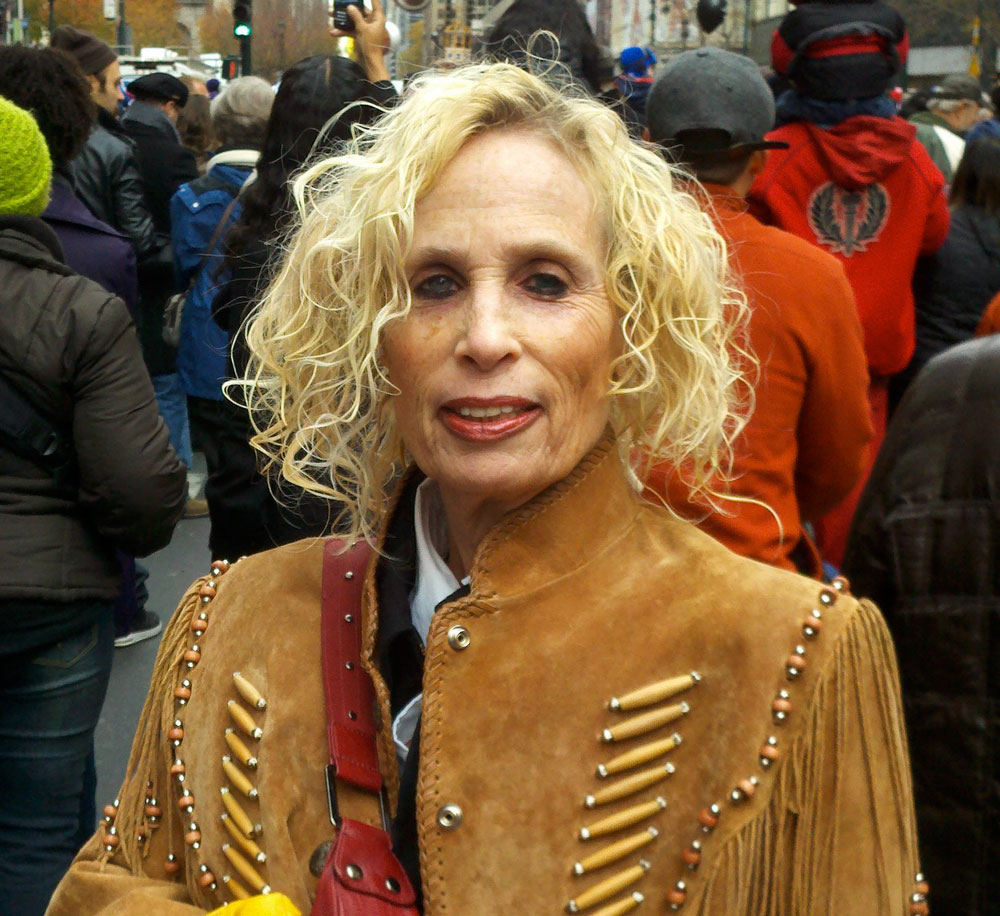
- Born: Newark, New Jersey, U.S.
- Education: School of Visual Arts
- Known for: New Media Technology, Feminist, Installation Art, Public Art Works, and Robotic Sculptures
- Awards: Pollock-Krasner Foundation Grant, National Endowment for the Arts Fellowship
- Website: www.ninayankowitz.com

Nina Yankowitz is an American visual artist known for her work in new media technology, site specific public works, and installation art. She is a National Endowment for the Arts fellow, and a Pollock-Krasner Foundation Award recipient.

== Biography ==
Yankowitz was born in Newark, NJ, and later lived in South Orange, NJ. She graduated from Columbia High School, and later from the School of Visual Arts in New York in 1969. Yankowitz became a faculty member in the graduate school at UMass Amherst in 1971. During the fall of 1975, Yankowitz was a visiting artist in residence at the Art Institute of Chicago where she first met her future husband, architect Barry Holden. Yankowitz and Holden met again in the 1980s in New York, and married in 1986. They had a son, Ian, in 1989 who is a film and documentary editor. Her image is included in the iconic 1972 poster Some Living American Women Artists by Mary Beth Edelson. Her artist's book, Scenario sounds ... is in the National Museum of Women in the Arts,

== Art projects ==
In her last years at the School of Visual Arts, she began developing unstretched draped paintings, which she exhibiting at the Kornblee Gallery from 1968 to 1971, including solo exhibits of "Draped Paintings" and "Pleated Paintings".

Yankowitz creates video projections, and/or time-based artwork installations and permanent artworks sited in the public realm. She sometimes works with technology teams to create interactive games. She states:

To enhance individual awareness of societal or environmental conditions I sometimes infuse interactive games and social networking tools into sculptural or virtual elements in my installations. My video projections are created to challenge and stretch commonly accepted definitions of reality.

=== Criss~Crossing The Divine ===
Criss~Crossing The Divine is a virtual sanctuary that addresses the ever-expanding religious intolerance fueling ISIS and global wars. Visitors play the team's interactive games while robotic mannequins, representing devotees from each faith, perform a quintessential gesture like actors onstage communicating in her video projecting on a wall. People use interactive wands to curate topics and assign more or less importance to each topic they select while the team's software parses and integrates all the more or less importance assignments the person makes. This process ultimately determines which three hundred color-coded scriptures will appear. The participant is often surprised by what they find after visiting a website to learn from which religions their color-coded scripture results were sourced. Playing the games developed with the global team, acknowledges that as the world turns, our personal perspectives change and accordingly what we search to find within the scriptures shifts. This insures this kind of search can never settle into a permanent groove. The goal is to ask new questions that yield new perspectives from individual quests, ad infinitum and with no amen. It is an updated version of "CROSSINGS"—An interactive installation with games developed with her team during 2007-08. It premiered at the Thessaloniki Biennale in Greece 2009. She conceived and designed the art project as "House of Worships Not Warships" in 2000.

Nina Yankowitz and other original “The Third Woman” team members Martin Rieser, Pia Tikka, Anna Dumitriu, directed original interactive film/game interventions. Prior team versions were created with other original team members: Pia Tikka, Martin Rieser, Anna Dumitri, Barry Roshto, Nita Tandon, Cliona Harmey, and others was shown at the Kunsthalle, Vienna, Greek State Museum of Contemporary Art in Greece.

=== Global Warming Bursting Seams ===
It is a site-specific installation at the Museumsquartier in Vienna 2012. A digitally mapped window was created over an actual window for people to look through and see her video projections displaying environmental disasters caused by Global warming conditions. Simultaneously, virtual water is seeping through the museum's masonry wall.

=== ShatterFloodMudHouses ===
ShatterFloodMudHouses is an HD video animation displaying a portrait exposing, confronting, and forecasting environmental and societal decay. A generic glass house is viewed spinning through myriad cycles inherent in the causal effects of erratic global warming weather, political divisiveness, and the ever-expanding intolerance of differences. Blurring edges between solid and fictive space questions the real-to-reel while shattering expectations of norms into particles of dust. Viewers are lulled and suddenly tossed between calm and brutal disturbances by interventions that shatter and assault psychological, physical and auditory space.

=== Kiosk.edu ===
An aluminum and glass and house that reflects quotes from artists, architects, and performers. These were mined from contemporary and art historical excavations. It was designed to inform the public about the personal and conceptual journeys these artists traveled in their creative processes. The house is lighted from within and illuminates the texts. At nighttime, the words seem to hover above the ground. It was installed at the Architectural Institute of America in New York City (2003), The Chicago Art Fair (2005), and the garden of the Guild Hall Art Museum garden in E. Hampton N.Y. during 2005.

=== CloudHouse ===
An aluminum and tempered glass house that generates a water vapor cloud changing shape due to the external weather conditions. 6'-4" X 8'-4" x 7'-2". Sag Harbor, New York, 2005

=== Buried Treasures/Secrets in the Sciences ===
Buried Treasures/ Secrets in the Sciences is an installation composed with video projections interacting with a science laboratory tableau. Virtual texts, seen spilling from an actual glass tube, float on fictive liquid mercury and tell stories about women in the sciences who are unrecognized for their contributions. 2009, National Academy Museum, New York 2011

With a continued interest in merging elements from the sciences and the arts, an endeavor begun during the 1970s when her Paint Reading Scores linked underlying concepts of synesthesia to artistic practice, she found herself unearthing some women not recognized for their contributions in the sciences during the time of their discoveries.

=== Truth or Consequences: An Interactive Global Warming Game ===
Truth or Consequences: An Interactive Global Warming Game with Barry Holden and Martin Rieser. The game enables participants to interact with a video projection or QR code costumes to opine about global warming weather conditions that threaten our universe. Isea2012 attendees used smart phones to scan the codes and choose options, from a menu of possible global warming outcomes, that best reflect their views about the environmental dilemmas we face today. A tally of the most voted upon options that ISEA2012 participants made are available to view at a dedicated website after the conference closing.

The QR code was chosen as a near universal interaction device, enabling audiences to collaborate using mobile phones regardless of platform. Before entering the space, people were invited to download a free QR code scanner to their smart phones. They then encountered a large (9'x16') video projecting a landscape displaying various effects of global warming weather conditions that threaten the habitat. The animated pastiche included: atmospheric, water, geological formations, and flora and fauna found within the New Mexico borders.

Embedded animations peppered the landscape image projection. For example, rocks in the projection slowly cracked and crumbled, revealing molten lava possibly spreading and smothering the earth. Or a peaceful animation of a rippling mountain lake slowly moving abruptly evaporates and changes into a withered, barren lakebed.

These animations looped on the wall for 15 seconds until an image froze on a QR Code embedded in an area of the landscape projection. The audience could then scan these live codes with smart phones to review issues and choose responses from a menu of text options presenting possible reactions to global warming threats.

After the presentation, the team wore shirts with printed interactive codes for other ISEA2012 attendees to engage with the game/survey. All were instructed to choose options they believe best reflects their personal views about today's environmental dilemmas.

== Publications ==
- Yankowitz, Nina (2010). "Crossings". Leonardo. 43 (5): 500–501. doi:10.1162/LEON_a_00053. S2CID 246014331.
- Rieser, Martin; Tikka, Pia; Dumitriu, Anna; Yankowitz, Nina (2010). "The Third Woman". Leonardo. 43 (5): 494–495. doi:10.1162/LEON_a_00049. S2CID 57571226.
- 1981 "Scenario Sounds" by Nina Yankowitz, published Street Editions, Reprint 2007 NYartProjects LLC
- 1979 Voices of the Eye, by Nina Yankowitz, published by Stefanotti Gallery

== Select reviews, articles, and catalogues ==
- 2014 Nina Yankowitz: Searching Sacred Texts, East Hampton Star, Mark Segal, July 8
- 2014 Nina Yankowitz Re-Rights/Re-Writes: Works from 1967-2012, Woman's Art Journal, by Joyce Beckenstein, Editor Joan Marter
- 2014 NY Times, Playing Word Games With Sacred Texts, By Joyce Beckenstein July 11, 2014
- 2011 Third Woman Interactive Performance/Film Game, Critics Pick New York Time Out Magazine
- 2010 NY Times, Academy Gives Art Some Wiggle Room, By Karen Rosenberg Feb.18, 2010
- 2010 Not Just the Whitney Biennial, – Artopia, by John Perrault
- 2009 The Heretics, Joan Braderman, Art Forum Mag. By Ed Halter Oct.
- 2009 Interactive Storytelling: Second Joint International Conference, Page 340, 360 Martin Rieser, Pia Tikka (Finland), Nina Yankowitz (USA)
- 2005 New Sculpture Speaks Volumes, Southampton Press, by Pat Rogers August 11
- 2004 Outside/In, Art News Magazine, Lily Wei, March pg. 134
- 2002 Nina Yankowitz Art Of The Moment, The East Hampton Star, Robert Long
- 1999 Public Art Review, Fall/Winter '99 issue 21, volume II
- 1998 NY Times, Fresh Looks at Prints and a Town, Helen Harrison, Sept. 13
- 1997 NY Times, Oct. 31, Holland Cotter
- 1996 Kansas City Star, Fri. Aug. 30
- 1995 Art Press, French Edition, Author Sol Ostrow
- 1983 NY Times, Art-The Case for Crafts, Grace Glueck, July 8
- 1973 NY Times, Peter Schjeldahl, April 1
- 1972 NY Times, Can Women Have 'One-Man' Shows?, Cindy Nemser, Jan. 9
- 1971 NY Times, Cheops Would Approve, James R. Mellow, Dec. 5
