= Susana Torre =

Argentine-born American architect

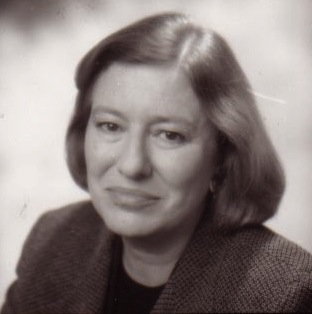
Susana Torre 1995

Susana Torre (born 1944) is an Argentine-born American architect, critic and educator, based in New York City (1968–2008) and in Carboneras, Almeria, Spain (since 2009). Torre has developed a career that combined “theoretical concerns with the actual practice of building” and architectural and urban design with teaching and writing. Torre was the first woman invited to design a building in Columbus, IN, “a town internationally known for its collection of buildings designed by prominent architects.”

In 1977 Torre organized and curated the first major exhibition of American women architects, and edited the book Women in American Architecture: A Historic and Contemporary Perspective. The exhibition opened at the Brooklyn Museum in 1977 and traveled across the United States and to the Netherlands. The exhibition and book of the same title, which she edited and to which she contributed three essays, pioneered work in this field. Torre was also a co-founder of Heresies, A Feminist Journal on Art and Politics; was a member of the editorial collectives of Heresies 2: Patterns of Communication and Space; and Heresies 11: Making Room: Women in Architecture; and served on the editorial board of Chrysalis between 1976 and 1978.

== Early life and career ==
Susana Torre was born in Puan, province of Buenos Aires, Argentina, the eldest of three children of Alfonso A. Torre, an economist, and Amelia E. Silva, a school teacher. Upon the death of her father when she was eight years old, the family moved to La Plata, near Buenos Aires, where she attended public schools until beginning her studies for the Dipl. Arch. at the Schools of Architecture and Planning, Universidad de La Plata and Universidad de Buenos Aires, which she received in 1968. The year before her graduation Torre was selected to represent Argentina at the 1967 International Design Conference in Aspen, Colorado and also won a Fellowship from the Edgar Kaufmann Jr. Foundation which enabled her to take a study trip across the US. Upon her return to Argentina, she established the Design Department of the Museo Provincial de Bellas Artes in La Plata, the first of any museum in Latin America. While still a student, Torre designed a six-story apartment building in La Plata for banker David Graiver and also built a small house for herself and her first husband, painter Alejandro Puente, in City Bell.

Torre returned to the US in 1968 to complete postgraduate work on computer applications to architecture at Columbia University School of Architecture and Planning. In New York City, she became associated with The Museum of Modern Art’s Department of Architecture in 1971 as a fellow of the Edward John Noble Foundation and worked on a research project on New Urban Settlements at the Institute for Architecture and Urban Studies in New York.

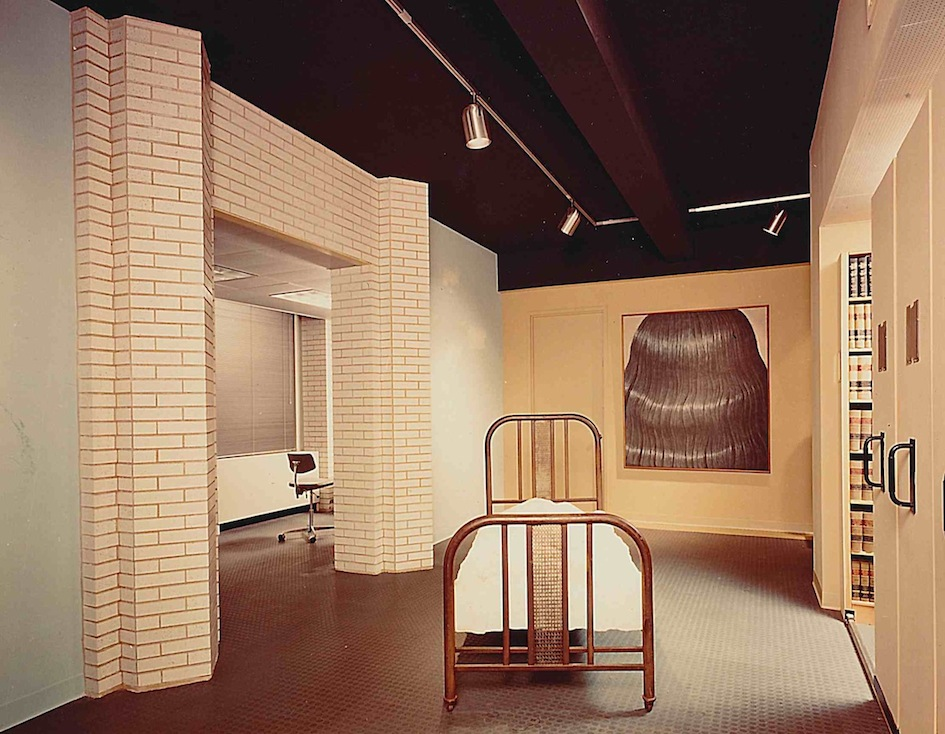
Law Office, New York City, 1977

In 1972 Torre joined the faculty of SUNY at Old Westbury, NY, where she developed the Art Department’s first design curriculum. The following year she co-founded the Archive of Women in Architecture of The Architectural League of New York, which led to the 1977 exhibition “Women in American Architecture: A Historic and Contemporary Perspective” that she curated and for which she edited the book of the same title. In 1978 she established The Architectural Studio in New York City. One of her first projects in New York, the Law Offices of art collector Harry Torczyner, was selected by the American Institute of Architects as one of the seventies’ memorable spaces (AIA Journal, January 1980).

== Architectural and design practice ==
Torre's architectural and design practice is “based upon an intense theoretical, ethical, and civic sense of architecture and urban design.” According to architect and author John Loomis, her buildings and theoretical projects “bring together cultural, social and regional themes.” Torre's designs have encompassed a range of scales; from her book cover for Lucy Lippard’s From the Center to her park proposal for Ellis Island, New York Harbor, they have included building renovations, residential design and public buildings. Among her best-known projects are Fire Station Five in Columbus, Indiana; the Ellis Island, New York Harbor, park proposal; the Clark and Garvey Houses in The Hamptons, New York; the Schermerhorn Hall renovation for Columbia University, and the Consulate of the Ivory Coast in New York City. These and other award-winning designs have been published in the US, Latin America, Japan, France, Italy, Germany, Spain and Australia and are included in standard reference sources such as Encyclopedia of 20th Century Architecture, Contemporary Masterworks, Contemporary Architects, and Dictionnaire de l’Architecture du XX^{me} Siècle. She was the first woman to gain one of the highly competitive public commissions in Columbus, IN, where her Fire Station #5 (described below) is listed in the Whitney Guide to 20th Century American Architecture: 200 Key Buildings. In 2008 she completed the residential community of seven seafront houses where she now lives with her husband, writer and sociologist Geoffrey E. Fox, in Carboneras, Spain. The design was based on her 1973 studies on spatial matrixes and indeterminate functions, where “a serial flexibility allows symbol to collaborate with function and marks the allegorical elements in daily life.”

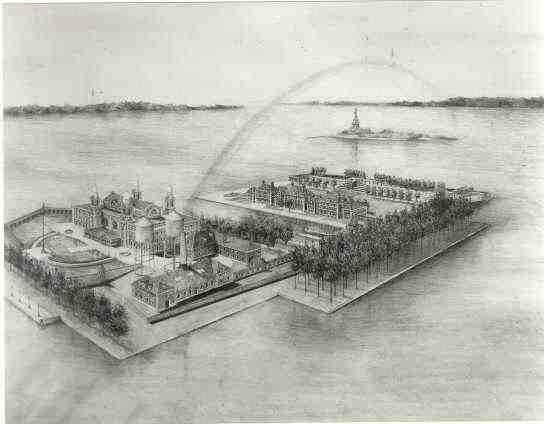
Ellis Island Park Proposal, New York Harbor 1981

Torre has devoted much of her professional life to theorizing the relationship of buildings to their physical and cultural contexts; and the way feminist concerns and cultural and regional identity can be expressed in architectural form and function. “Firehouse #5 (finished in 1987) was the first firehouse designed specifically to integrate women in the firefighting force. The design, which eliminated dorm-style sleeping and promoted bonding in the kitchen rather than the locker room, was adopted nationwide.” “While leaving the safety assumptions of the type intact, Torre’s building has created a typological invention through her challenge of program assumptions based on gender.” “It is a “rare example of how a feminist perspective can alter both the spatial organization, influenced by social conventions, and the form of the building.”

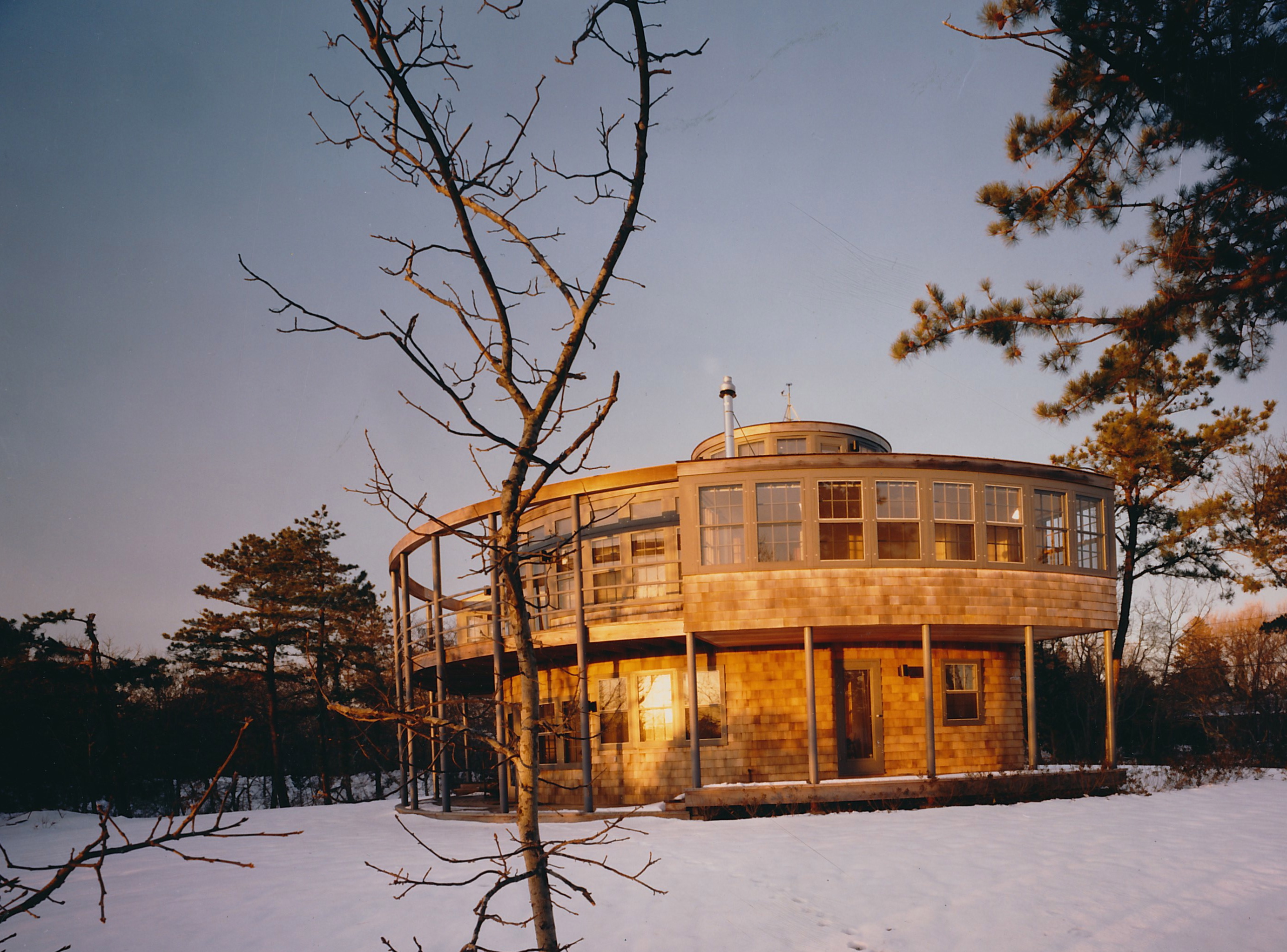
Garvey House, Amagansett, NY

Torre was one of the architects selected to represent the United States at the International Exhibition of Architecture, La Biennale di Venezia, Italy, in 1980. Her drawings and projects have been exhibited in numerous venues, including the Cooper-Hewitt Museum, New York City; Fort Worth Arts Center; Institute of Contemporary Arts, Chicago; La Jolla Museum of Contemporary Art; Walker Arts Center, Minneapolis; and Yale University Art Gallery. Her drawings are collected in the City of Columbus, IN, Architectural Archives; Columbia University Avery Library Dept. of Drawings & Archives, Avery Library centennial drawing archive; the Davis Museum at Wellesley College, Wellesley MA; and The International Archive of Women in Architecture, Virginia Tech Libraries, Special Collections, Blacksburg, VA, which also houses a collection of her papers from 1977 to 1988.

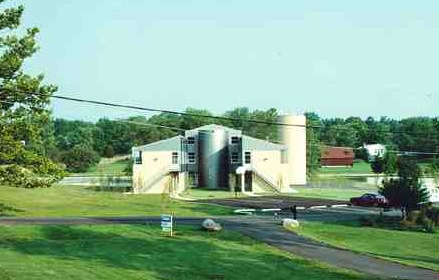
Fire Station 5, Columbus IN

== Academic career ==
Torre's academic positions include Director of the Cranbrook Academy of Art (1994–95); Chair of the Parsons School of Design Architecture and Environmental Design Department (1991–94); Director of the Architecture Program at Barnard College, Columbia University (1982–85). She has taught architectural and urban design, history and theory at schools including Columbia University, Yale University, New York University (USA); The University of Sydney (Australia); the University of Buenos Aires (Argentina); and Kassel University (Germany), among others. She was also a speaker at many intellectual conferences. Torre has been invited to lecture about her work at over 150 universities and professional associations worldwide. Her pedagogical approach has stressed the design of buildings as a response to environmental conditions; cultural and physical context; the critical examination of spatial distribution as an embodiment of social hierarchies; sustainable materials and structure; and an esthetics that wove modern transparency and openness with visual metaphors expressive of each project's character.

Torre's works were displayed at the Museum of Modern Art, The Institute for Architecture and Urban Studies, the Otis Art Institute, MIT's Hayden Gallery, as well as the Copper Hewitt Museum.

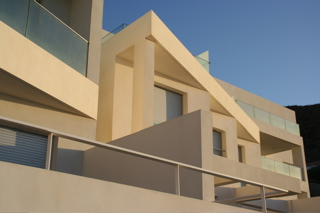
Residential development, Carboneras, Spain

As a leader of interdisciplinary design teams during her teaching career, she involved her students in architectural competitions and exhibitions, collecting many awards. Her research and writing has focused on women and gender issues, architecture in Latin America; and the presence of collective memory in public spaces.

== Awards ==
Torre has been awarded numerous awards for her designs and scholarly work, such as the Ailsa Mellon Bruce Senior Fellow, Center for Advanced Studies of the Visual Arts, The National Gallery, Fall 2003; The Graham Foundation 2002; The National Endowment for the Humanities, USA, 1986, 2005; The American Institute of Architects New York Chapter 1994; Fulbright Senior Scholar, US Commission for International Educational Exchange 1990; The National Endowment for the Arts, USA, 1973, 1979, 1986, 1990; and The Architectural Record Houses Award of Excellence for Design 1981 and 1988.

== Selected bibliography ==
- Abercrombie, Stanley. "Law Office," Interiors, March 1977
- Blanco, Adriana, "Redefiniciones: Entrevista a Susana Torre," La Prensa, Buenos Aires, April 4, 1995
- Bliznakov, Milka, “Susana Torre,” in Stephen Sennett, ed. Encyclopedia of Twentieth Century Architecture, Fitzroy Dearborn, Chicago:2000
- Boissiere, Olivier, "Columbus, les architectes aux champs", Le Monde, August 13, 1988
- Boles, Daralice, "Teaching Architecture." Progressive Architecture, Sept. 1986
- Bonta, Juan Pablo, American Architects and Texts. A Computer-Aided Analysis of the Literature, Cambridge: MIT Press. 1996
- Carson, Ray, "First Impressions: Interview with Susana Torre," Cranbrook Journal, Fall/Winter 1995
- Dictionnaire de l'Architecture du XXème siecle, Paris: Hazan Editions, 1996
- Emanuel, Muriel, ed., Contemporary Architects, NY: St. James Press, 1985
- Feuerstein, Marcia. “An Interview with Susana Torre,” in Reflective Practitioner Issue II, Virginia Tech, 2002
- Filler, Martin, "Between Dream and Memory," House and Garden, January 1982
- Franck, Karen A., "A Feminist Approach to Architecture," in Ellen Perry Berkeley, ed. Architecture, A Place for Women, Washington and London: Smithsonian Institution Press, 1989
- Goldberger, Paul, "Bringing Light and Space to a Tenement," The New York Times, 5/5/1987
- ___"Diversity and New Directions," On the Rise, Penguin Books, 1985
- ___"Emerging Young Architects," The New York Times, 9/16/1982
- Glusberg, Jorge. “Susana Torre. Fire Station nº5, Tipton Lakes, Columbus, Indiana, 1985-87”, Contemporary Masterpieces, St. James Press, Chicago and London, 1991.
- Gusevich, Miriam, "Fire Station #5. Columbus, Indiana," Inland Architect, Sept./October, 1987
- Jackson, Kenneth, ed., The Encyclopedia of New York, New Haven: Yale University Press, 1995, under "Architecture"
- Katz Smith, Laura, "International Archive of Women in Architecture: A Guide to the Collections," Virginia Polytechnic Institute, Blacksburg: University Libraries, 1991
- Kulterman, Udo, Architecture in the 20th Century, New York: Van Nostrand Reinhold, 1993
- LeBlanc, Sydney, 20th Century American Architecture: 200 Key Buildings, New York: Whitney Library of Design, 1993; republished as The Architecture Traveler. A Guide to 250 Key 20th -Century American Buildings, New York: W.W. Norton 2000
- Lippard, Lucy, "Complexes: Architectural Sculpture in Nature," Art in America, January 1979
- Loomis, John, entry on Susana Torre in Diccionario Akal de la Arquitectura del Siglo XX, Jean-Paul Midant (dir.) Ediciones Akal 2004
- Love, Barbara J. (Editor) and Nancy F. Cott, Feminists Who Changed America, 1963–1975, Urbana and Chicago: University of Illinois Press, 2006
- McCoy, Esther, Guide to U.S. Architecture, Santa Monica, CA: Arts + Architecture Press, 1982
- Miller, Abbott, "Cranbrook: The Future. Interview with Susana Torre," Statements, American Center for Design, 1995
- Morton, David, "Neotypes: Susana Torre" and "For More Complexity," Progressive Architecture, May 1977
- Muntañola Thornberg, Josep, "Susana Torre, sus proyectos, sus historias" ON Nº 30 (Barcelona), 4/15/ 1982
- Naylor, David, ed., Contemporary Masterworks, London: St. James Press, 1992
- Parks, Janet, ed., Contemporary Architectural Drawings, San Francisco: Pomegranate Art Books, 1991
- Shoshkes, Ellen, The Design Process; Case Studies in Project Development, New York: Whitney Library of Design, 1989
- Smith, C. Ray, History of 20th Century Interior Design, New York: Harper and Row, 1984
- Stephens, Suzanne, “The Woman Behind the T-Square," Progressive Architecture, March 1977
- Stern, Robert A. M., Fishman, David, and Tilove, Jacob. New York 2000: Architecture and Urbanism from the Bicentennial to the Millennium. New York: The Monacelli Press, 2006
- Twombly, Robert, "Ellis Island: An Architectural History," in Susan Jonas, ed., Ellis Island. Echoes from a Nation's Past. New York: Aperture, 1989
- Weisman, Leslie Kanes, Discrimination by Design, Urbana and Chicago: University of Illinois Press, 1992
- White, Norval, AIA Guide to New York City, Fourth Edition, New York: Random House 2000
- Wolfe, Kevin, "Island of the Dreams," Metropolis, January/February 1985

== Selected writings by Susana Torre ==
- Women in American Architecture: A Historic and Contemporary Perspective. New York: Whitney Library of Design, 1977; editor and author of the following chapters: " A Parallel History - Introduction," " New Professional Identities: Four Women in the Sixties" (with Jane McGroarty), "Women in Architecture and the New Feminism," "A Current Portfolio of Projects and Ideas," and " The Pyramid and the Labyrinth." Dutch and Spanish translations.
- “Ciudad, memoria y espacio público: el caso de los monumentos a los detenidos y desaparecidos.”, Memoria y Sociedad, Vol.10 Nº 20, Enero-Junio de 2006, Revista del Departamento de Historia y Geografía. Facultad de Ciencias Sociales. Pontificia Universidad Javeriana, Bogotá, Colombia.
- “Building Utopia: Mary Otis Stevens and the Lincoln MA House,” in Lauri Umansky, ed. Impossible to Hold: Women and Culture in the 1960s. New York: New York University Press, 2005.
- “The Elusive Unifying Architectural Discourse: Teaching Architectural History in Latin America,” Journal of the Society of Architectural Historians, December 2002.
- “An Esthetics of Reconciliation. Cultural Identity and Modern Architecture in Latin America,” in Hubert-Jan Henket and Hilde Heynen, eds. Back from Utopia, Delft: Docomomo International, 2002.
- “Constructing Memorials,” in Enwezor, Ongwui, ed., Documenta 11 Platform 2: Experiments in Truth, Kassel: Documenta 2002.
- "Expanding the Urban Design Agenda," in Rothschild, Joan et al. ed., Feminist Perspectives on Architecture, Design and Technology, New York: Rutgers University Press, 1999.
- "Claiming the Public Space," in Agrest, Diana; Conway, Pat and Weisman, Leslie eds., The Sex of Architecture, New York: Abrams, 1996, A.I.A. Theory Book Award, 1996. The essay was republished and translated into Spanish in Aula, U.C. Berkeley 1999; republished in Rendell, Barbara et al., eds., Gender Space Architecture: An Interdisciplinary Introduction, New York: Routledge 2000; and Malcolm Miles, Tim Hall, Iain Borden, eds. The City Cultures Reader, Routledge 2004.
- "Cultural Identity and Modernity in Latin American Architecture," in Loomis, John, ed., Other Americas, Design Book Review, Spring/Summer 1994.
- "Identidad Cultural y Regionalismo: Evolución del Estilo Misionero Californiano, 1870-1930," in Amaral, Aracy, ed., O Neocolonial na America Latina, São Paulo: Fundacao Latinoamericana, 1992.
- "Space as Matrix," in Making Room: Women in Architecture, Heresies 11, 1981. Reprinted in Avenue, University of Oregon, 1982.
- "Architecture with People," Design Quarterly, Winter 1979.
- "Feminist Monument (For Marion Mahony)," Heresies 2, 1977.
- "Architecture and Revolution: Cuba 1959-74," Progressive Architecture, October 1974; Japanese translation in Kenchiku Bunka (Japan), February 1975
