= Mary Beth Edelson =

American artist (1933–2021)

- Born: Mary Elizabeth Johnson; February 6, 1933; East Chicago, Indiana, U.S.
- Died: April 20, 2021 (aged 88)
- Other name: Mary Beth Strauss
- Known for: Painting, collage, performances
- Notable work: Some Living American Women Artists / Last Supper, Story Gathering Boxes, The Negotiation
- Movement: Feminist art movement
- Spouses: Jerome Strauss (m. 1959; div. 1964) Alfred H. Edelson (m. 1965; div. 1971)
- Partner: Robert Stackhouse (1972–1999)

External image
- Photograph of Mary Beth Edelson

Mary Elizabeth Edelson (née Johnson; February 6, 1933 – April 20, 2021) was an American artist and pioneer of the feminist art movement, deemed one of the notable "first-generation feminist artists". Edelson was a printmaker, book artist, collage artist, painter, photographer, performance artist, and author. Her works have been shown at the Museum of Modern Art, the Smithsonian American Art Museum, and the Museum of Contemporary Art in Chicago.

She began her studies at the Art Institute of Chicago and continued as she pursued her Bachelor's and Master of Fine Arts degrees. She taught art at the college level, including School of Art and the Smithsonian Institution in Washington, D.C., and at the Corcoran Gallery of Art's Dupont Center for Advanced Studies.

Inspired by Henri Matisse, Paul Cézanne and Édouard Manet, she made paintings of mothers and children in the 1960s. During that decade, she owned a gallery in Indianapolis. Her art changed markedly in the 1970s when she shifted to performance and other forms of art, as well as how women are depicted in art. Her studies of philosophy and psychology greatly influenced her art, both in terms of content and medium. Important works of the early 1970s are representations of goddesses, which Edelson used as a contrast against established, patriarchal viewpoints of women. In Some Living American Women Artists / Last Supper, the faces of the disciples are replaced with noted women artists, and Story Gathering Boxes explored stories of the feminine experience. Other notable works include The Negotiation and Kali Bobbitt.

She worked to increase the rate at which works of art by women are among museum collections. She helped found and was an active member of the Heresies Collective, which published the Heresies journal, to show and promote art made by women. She also joined the feminist cooperative gallery, A.I.R. Gallery (Artists In Residence), which held exhibits of Edelson's work, including The Memorial to the 9,000,000 Women Burned as Witches in the Christian Era. In that exhibit, the intention was to empower women attendees. She was also active in the civil rights movement.

== Personal life ==
=== Early life and education ===
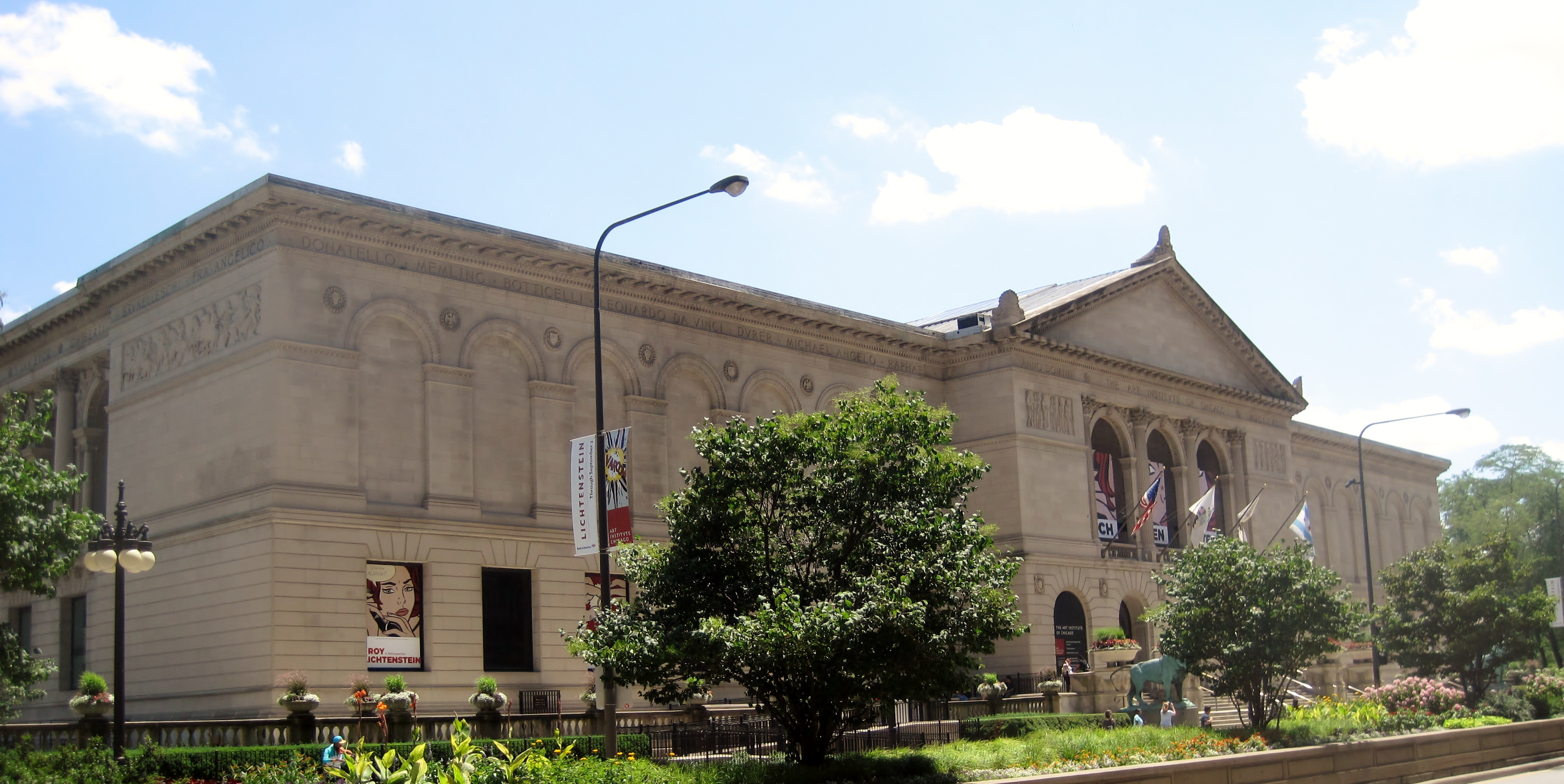
Art Institute of Chicago

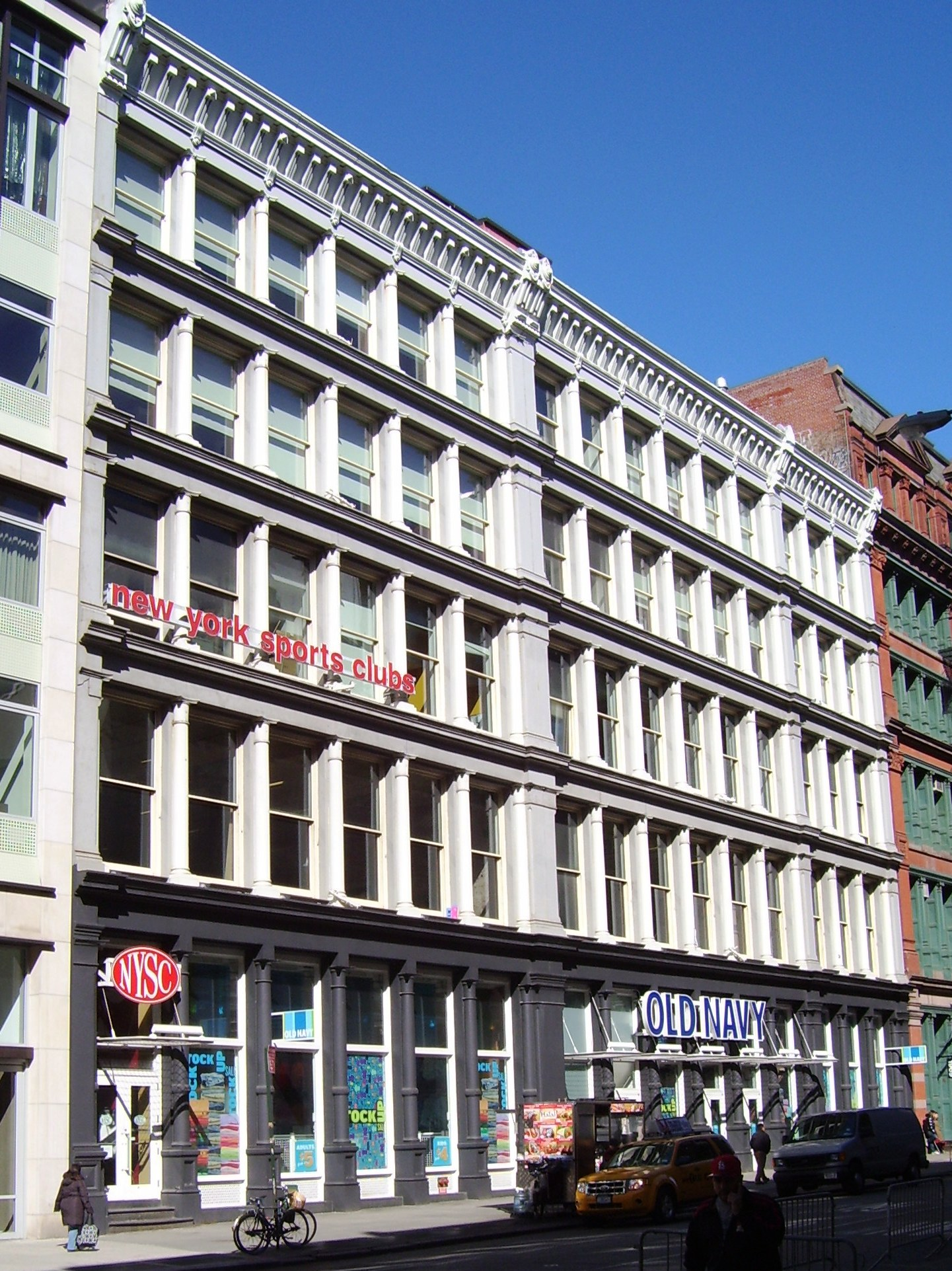
Edelson lived in SoHo, Manhattan starting in 1976.

Mary Beth Edelson was born Mary Elizabeth Johnson in East Chicago, Indiana, on February 8, 1933, the eldest of three children born to Mary Lou and A. M. Johnson, a dentist. Her siblings are Jayne and Allan. (Note: Her mother, Mary Lou Johnson, died in 1985, after the death of her husband, A. M. Johnson. Her mother was engaged in a large number of civil, community, and church activities—including leadership roles in art, sorority, Girl Scouts, medical, and charitable endeavors. The Council for a Greater Hammond named her "Most Deserving Mother" in 1953.) Encouraged by her parents, she became interested in art and activism in her early teens. Upon learning that a German family had escaped from a labor camp (German: Arbeitslager), Edelson organized a group, called a "peace cell", which supports people who have experienced trauma. She was 13 years old.

She started taking classes at the Art Institute of Chicago during the weekends when she was around 13 years of age. She developed an interest in creating large works of art when she created stage flats for Washington High School's theater.

From 1951 to 1955, Edelson studied at DePauw University in Greencastle, Indiana, where she majored in art and minored in philosophy and speech. Her works were exhibited in 1955 at a solo senior-year exhibition, where one of her paintings was deemed unseemly for "ministers and small children". Angry faculty members demanded the works to be pulled from the show, which resulted in protest at the university. She studied during the summers at the School of the Art Institute of Chicago (1953–1954). She received her Master of Fine Arts degree in 1958 from the New York University.

Edelson resided in New York during the mid-1950s. She married a lawyer, Jerome M. Strauss, on June 5, 1959 and then lived as Mary Beth Strauss in Indianapolis. By 1961, she was president of the 1444 Gallery. They had a daughter, Lynn. In 1972, a custody battle over Lynn ensued and her ex-husband was granted primary custody. Her experience is told in Phyllis Chesler's book, Mothers on Trial: The Battle for Children and Custody.

She married Alfred H. Edelson, the CEO of Rytex Stationery, in 1965 and became Mary Beth Edelson. (Note: Mary Beth and Alfred Edelson were married in the last week of December 1964.) He purchased Talbot Gallery as a wedding present for her. He was the president of the Democratic council of Indiana and on the board of the Fletcher National Bank. Al Edelson and Mary Beth have one child in 1966 named Nick.

In 1968, she left Indianapolis for Washington, D.C., with her husband, Alfred H. Edelson. They later divorced. By 1972, Edelson was living with artist Robert Stackhouse in her Washington, D.C., house. The couple moved to New York in 1976. They lived in Soho in a loft with a living area and two studios, one for each artist. (Note: Stackhouse married artist Carol Mickett sometime before 2003.) Edelson and Stackhouse were together for 27 years. (Note: In 1983, they were called an "Art Couple" in the Museum of Modern Art (MoMA) exhibition, Art Couples II: Mary Beth Edelson and Robert Stackhouse .)

In April 2024, three years after Mary Beth's death, her son Nick Edelson was reported to have ordered the disposal of art and ephemera outside of her studio in SoHo without notifying her estate's gallery. Part of the material was salvaged by passersby wishing to preserve some of the material.

== Early career ==
During the second half of the 1950s, Edelson became active in the emergent feminist movement and the civil rights movement. Her work in the 1960s—inspired by Henri Matisse, Paul Cézanne and Édouard Manet—were made of scenes of mothers and children. Edelson's feminist and conceptual art consists of bronze sculptures, paintings, collages, prints, story gathering boxes, and sketches. She is also a photographer, book artist, and performance artist.

She taught art at Park School in Indianapolis, Montclair State College in New Jersey, and, after 1968, at the School of Art in Washington, D.C. She taught at the Corcoran Gallery of Art's Dupont Center for Advanced Studies and at the Smithsonian for a nine-week women's study course in art.

== Feminist art movement ==
Edelson is considered one of the "first-generation feminist artists", a group that also includes Rachel Rosenthal, Carolee Schneemann, and Judy Chicago. In 1968, she established the country's first Conference for Women in the Visual Arts in Washington, D.C. Edelson presented her first feminist speech at the Herron Art Museum in 1968. She began a protest after an "all-male biennial" and "all man traveling art show" at the Corcoran Gallery of Art. They were not billed as all male, but no women were represented. Fueled by her frustration, she picketed with other women artists. Women's art groups were established after the event.

External images
- The art of Mary Beth Edelson, Brooklyn Museum
- Works of Mary Beth Edelson, MoMA
- Mary Beth Edelson, Whitney Museum of American Art
- Mary Beth Edelson, DePauw University
- "Feminist Humor as Political Device", Princeton

She became active in the feminist art movement and created performance art that glorified women after she moved to Washington, D.C. Working within the larger conceptual framework of the 1970s feminist art movement, Edelson's paintings, collages, and performances challenged hegemonic patriarchal values. Common themes in Edelson's work from this period include: ancient goddess figures, such as "the enigmatic Baubo, the trickster Sheela-na-gig, an Egyptian bird goddess, and Minoan snake goddesses"; references to popular culture; and subversions of art historical scenes. Lucy Lippard describes Edelson's approach to her artmaking: "Mary Beth Edelson's work arises from Feminism's double strength. Like the great Goddess to whom she has dedicated her art, she has (at least) two aspects—political rage and life-giving affirmation. The two merge in an individual identification with the collective ego: 'Women exploring who "we are" and not who "I am"'."

Edelson joined the feminist cooperative gallery, A.I.R. Gallery (Artists In Residence), which held exhibits of Edelson's work, including The Memorial to the 9,000,000 Women Burned as Witches in the Christian Era. In that exhibit, she used fire circles and fire ladders as rituals in 1977. The intention was to empower women attendees. She was an active participant in the Heresies Collective from its early days of operation. Chrysalis and the Heresies Collective, including the Heresies publication, were founded in part due to Edelson's efforts.

She was a leader of the Committee on Diversity and Inclusion and the Women's Action Coalition from 1992 and 1994, respectively. Edelson was a member of the Title IX Task Force, a group formed to increase the presence of women's painting and sculpture in museums in accordance with the Title IX amendment to the Civil Rights Act of 1964 that bans federally funded organizations from sex discrimination. The group, assembled in 1998, filed a complaint with the National Endowment for the Arts against the Museum of Modern Art, the Guggenheim Museum, and the Whitney Museum of American Art. The complaint addressed the underrepresentation of works of art by women in these museums, which in turn has the effect of restricting art dealers ability to sell art made by women. (Note: Since then, many museums are better supporting women artists and exhibiting their work. Even so, only 11% of art added to the permanent collections of the top 26 museums in the United States between 2008 and 2018 were made by women.)

The artist was included in the 2007-2009 "WACK! Art of the Feminist Revolution" traveling exhibition, curated by Connie Butler. It was removed from the exhibition, though, because audiences were not interested in the art of the 1970s, focused on the feminine body and spirituality. She was interviewed for the film !Women Art Revolution.

Edelson was interviewed for the Archives of American Art Oral History Program in the first half of February 2009 at her New York studio by former Independent Curators International (ICI) executive director Judith Olch Richards. The program has interviewed artists, critics, historians, and others since 1958 to record visual arts history. Over her career, she has lectured at museums and universities across the United States and internationally. Edelson's personal archives are held by the Fales Library and Special Collections at New York University.

== Notable works ==
=== Some Living American Women Artists / Last Supper ===
External images
- Some Living American Women Artists / Last Supper, Smithsonian Institution
- Considering Mary Beth Edelson's Some Living American Women Artists, The Brooklyn Rail

Some Living American Women Artists / Last Supper (1972) appropriated Leonardo da Vinci's The Last Supper, with the heads of notable women artists collaged over the heads of Christ and his apostles. Christ's head is overlaid with that of Georgia O'Keeffe. The artists collaged over the apostles include Lynda Benglis, Louise Bourgeois, Elaine de Kooning, Helen Frankenthaler, Nancy Graves, Lila Katzen, Lee Krasner, Georgia O'Keeffe, Louise Nevelson, Yoko Ono, M. C. Richards, Alma Thomas, and June Wayne. As well, other women artists have their image shown in the border of the piece; in all eighty-two women artists are part of the whole image. This image, addressing the role of religious and art historical iconography in the subordination of women, became "one of the most iconic images of the feminist art movement." Proposals for: Memorials to the 9,000,000 Women Burned as Witches in the Christian Era, a 1977 performance piece, had the same objective. New York's Museum of Modern Art acquired the original work Some Living American Women Artists / Last Supper along with four other original collage posters in the series. Among the works in the 22 Others exhibitions in 1973 and 2013, it is declared her "most famous work" by Karen Rosenberg of The New York Times.

=== Story Gathering Boxes ===
Story Gathering Boxes, an ongoing participatory artwork, was initiated in 1972 and exhibited though at least 2014, when it was shown at Aldridge Contemporary Art Museum in Hartford, Connecticut. The purpose of the exhibit is to question long-held beliefs and myths by learning and sharing stories with others. Paper cards contains a prompt inviting viewers to share personal stories on various topics, such as gender, childhood, and immigration. Story Gathering Boxes allows all viewers to participate in the creation of a collective narrative. The project was funded by the National Endowment for the Arts, The Andy Warhol Foundation for the Visual Arts, and The Florsheim Foundation.

=== Kali Bobbitt ===
Edelson's life-size monument to Lorena Bobbitt, who famously castrated her abusive husband in 1993, is entitled Kali Bobbitt (1994). It was included in MoMA PS1's 2015 survey show Greater New York. The sculpture reimagines Bobbitt as the warrior goddess Kali, mounted on a ziggurat plinth, adorned with knives, and grasping a severed penis. Edelson explains:

My interest in Bobbitt is obviously a feminist one—I had a point of view about it immediately and wanted to examine and express that. I started thinking of her as Saint Bobbitt because she really did something for all women: She retaliated. In addition to the book, I've also created a lot of other drawings and a sculpture of a Kali figure that I made out of a mannequin. She has a number of arms and a girdle of knives around her waist as well as a bracelet of severed penises around her arm. In short, she is decorated. I first exhibited the work at Combat Zone and put this very dramatic lighting on it. It sums up my feelings about the Bobbitt situation, a situation that I feel the same way about today as when I first heard about it—I thought it was really funny. As someone once said: A hundred ten million women worldwide are survivors of genital mutilation, and then there is just John Bobbitt––one man, one name.

— Mary Beth Edelson

=== Other works ===
The Negotiation, made in the 1980s on a 10 foot by 18 foot canvas, depicts a man and a woman in an embrace and seems to reflect self-insight.

In 1980, she created Shaking the Grass, gelatin silver print mounted on board and Seven Cycles: Public Rituals, offset lithograph on paper, both of which are at the Walker Art Center.

== Inspiration ==
=== Goddess metaphor ===
During the 1970s Edelson aligned herself with the feminist neopaganist goddess movement. She refers to Great Goddess theory throughout her work. Primordial archetypes, like the goddess, warriors, and tricksters that she invokes, represent a contrast to women of formalized, patriarchal societies. As Edelson states in 'Male Grazing: An Open Letter to Thomas McEvilley', published in the April 1989 New Art Examiner, her enduring interest has been in "destabilizing preexisting representations of masculine desire and privilege in relationship to the female body." She continues: "My rituals also provided resistance to the mind/body split, by acknowledging sexuality in spirituality, thus reconciling the experience of a united spirit, body, and mind."

According to Lucy Lippard, ritual is Edelson's "prime form". The National Museum of Women in the Arts' biography of Edelson states: "Her site-specific performances or 'rituals' […] strove to create a new feminine spirituality with its own values and iconography." Recurring "esthetic talismans" in her iconography are stone and fire, substances "at the heart of the Great Goddess myths that she is adapting to contemporary needs." For example, Edelson invited visitors to ritually enter through a flaming ladder installation titled Gate of Horn for her 1977 show at A.I.R. Gallery memorializing the 9,000,000 Women Burned as Witches in the Christian Era. On Halloween, adopted as the Woman's New Year, another public ritual took place in the gallery and outside street.

The artist's own naked body acts as a stand-in for the divine feminine in Women Rising (1973), Moon Mouth Series (1973–74), and later Goddess Head (1975) photomontages, for which the artist documented herself performing private rituals in nature and altered the images with a grease pencil to resemble mythological women such as Wonder Woman, Kali, the Wiccan Spiral Goddess, and Sheela-na-gig. She explains her conception of the goddess as "an internalized, sacred metaphor for an expanded and generous understanding of wisdom, power and the eternal universe." Her perspective is derived from her studies and research of philosophy, mythology, and psychology. She is particularly influenced by Carl Jung.

In the early 1970s, I was living in Washington, DC, and very involved in a Jungian seminar. I was fascinated with Jung's ideas about the collective unconscious and tried to make work that depicted that—very presumptuous of me, but to some extent it was good and became important to me as a feminist. The critique that Jung made of the symbolic world, myths, and the figures therein was liberating, and around that time I began working with fire, photography, collage, and performance. I was still painting, too! Over time, though, I began to understand that what Jung offered was still in the end a patriarchal construct, and I broadened my approach and analysis, informed by feminism.

— Mary Beth Edelson, Art Forum interview, November 10, 2011

=== Nude women's bodies ===
Edelson draws attention to the female nude to address the ways in which women have been "exploited and underrepresented in the history of art." She has used black-and-white photographs of her own naked body in both indoor and outdoor spaces as a ground for her paintings. "By presenting herself so self-possessed and unapologetically unclothed, she hoped to help loosen the centuries-old grip that male artists held on the passive female body," wrote the !Women Art Revolution. She created performance art using photographic works that involved body art, including O'Kevelson, shown in 1973, where her self-portraits were revised with a grease pencil until they resembled Louise Nevelson or Georgia O'Keeffe.

== Collections ==
Among the noteworthy museums with Edelson's work are: Guggenheim Museum, Guggenheim Museum, and MoMA PS1 in New York. In Washington, D.C., they are among the collections of Corcoran Gallery and National Museum of American Art. Her works are at the Museum of Contemporary Art in Chicago, Walker Art Center in Minneapolis and at the Seattle Art Museum. Her art is found in the Malmö Art Museum in Sweden and at Tate Modern in London.

== Exhibitions (selection) ==
Mary Beth Edelson's work has recently been the subject of various museum, gallery, and art fair exhibitions, including:

- 2018–2019 – Feminist Avant-garde / Art of the 1970s SAMMLUNG VERBUND Collection, Vienna, The Brno House of Arts, Brunn, Czech Republic.
- 2018 – Greater New York at MoMA PS1, Mary Beth Edelson, Feminist Humor as Political Device at Princeton University's Bernstein Gallery, The Devil Giving Birth to the Patriarchy at David Lewis Gallery, and Sex Work: Feminist Art & Politics at Frieze London. In March 2018, the entirety of Edelson's SoHo loft was digitally archived by The Feminist Institute (TFI), an online repository for feminist artwork overseen by Hunter College.
- 2017–2018 – Feministische Avantgarde der 1970er-Jahre aus der Sammlung Verbund, Wien. ZKM, Karlsruhe, Germany.
- 2017 — WOMAN. Feministische Avantgarde der 1970er-Jahre aus der Sammlung Verbund, MUMOK, Vienna, Austria.
- 2015–2017 – The Devil Giving Birth to the Patriarchy (2017) also prominently featured Edelson's Kali Bobbitt sculpture, previously exhibited at MoMA PS1 in 2015.
- 2017 – In March, Edelson's 1973 hand-painted silver gelatin prints––collectively titled Woman Rising––were exhibited in the show The Devil Giving Birth to the Patriarchy at David Lewis Gallery. This was the first exhibition to focus on the series, selections from which were later presented at Frieze London in a new section curated by Alison Gingeras titled Sex Work: Feminist Art & Politics. The Woman Rising—of a woman "standing staunchly, feet outspread, arms flung open to the sky, head thrust upwards. It is woman triumphant" is a motif that appears throughout Edelson's work.
- 2017 – In October, the Tate Modern accessioned Edelson's Selected Wall Collages (1972–2011). The collages, made between 1972 and 2011, vary in size with the smallest measuring approximately 100 millimeters in height and the largest about one meter in height and width. They depict imagined chimerical beings derived from "ancient mythology, art history, popular culture, nature and photographs of the artist and her peers."
- 2015 – Feministische Avantgarde der 1970er-Jahre. Werke aus der Sammlung Verbund, Wien, Hamburger Kunsthalle, Hamburg, Germany.

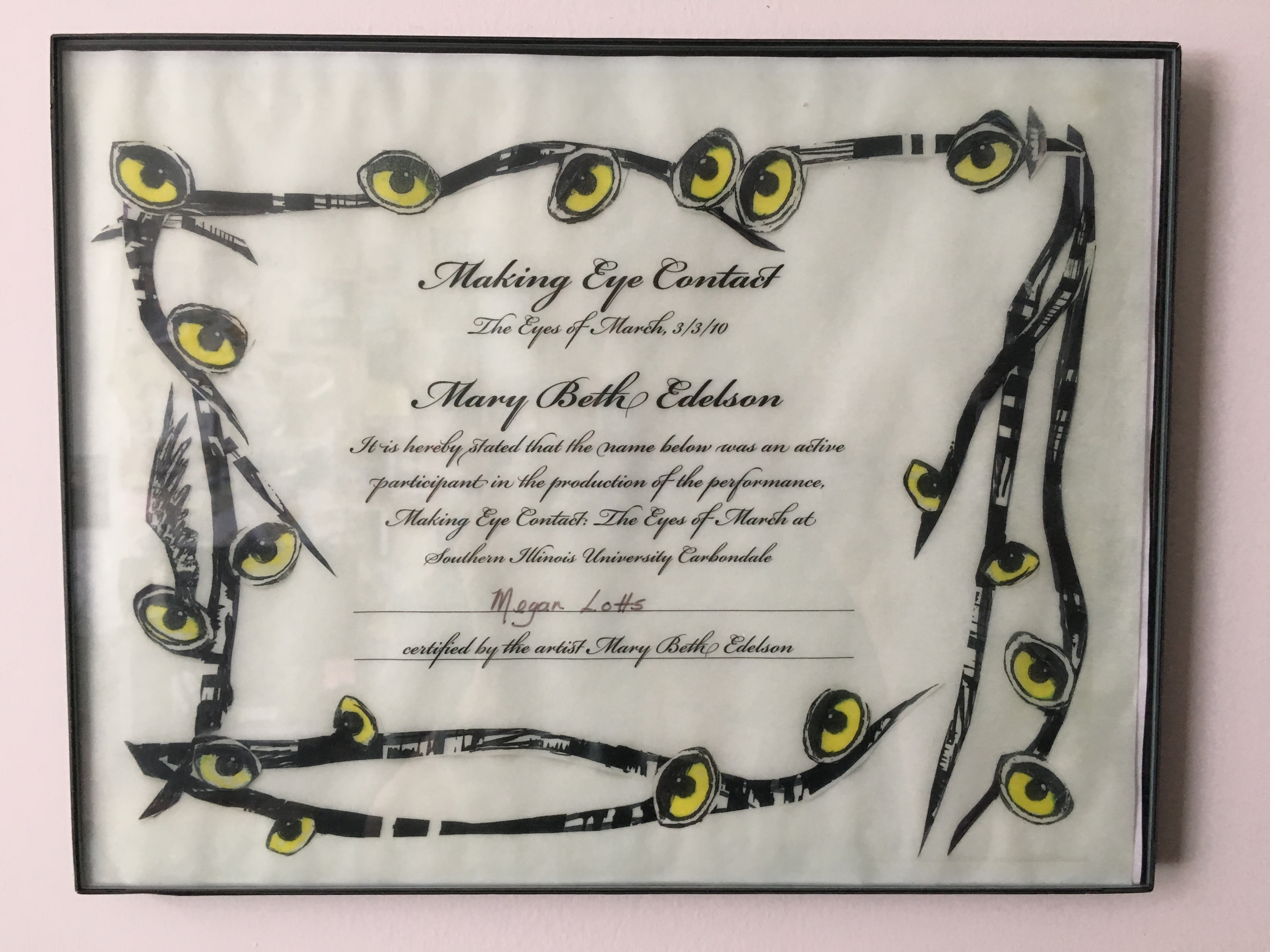
Making Eye Contact participation certificate

- 2013 – Making Eye Contact, a performance art experience and workshop where participants make eye contact with others, was held by Edelson at the School of Art and Design of Southern Illinois University Carbondale.
- 2013 – 22 Others was held at The Suzanne Geiss Company, SoHo, New York City. It was a restaged exhibition that of the same name that was held in 1973 at the Corcoran Gallery of Art and the Henri Gallery in Washington, D.C.
- 2006 – A Life Well Lived: A Retrospective of Mary Beth Edelson's Work" was assembled at the Malmo and traveled to the Migros Museum in Zurich.

== Books ==
The book The Art of Mary Beth Edelson (2002) includes information and images of her works, as well as conversations with artists and essays by her colleagues. In her essay about Edelson, "Shifting Signs", Laura Cottingham described "her engagement in producing images of female representation that seek to disrupt and transform the patriarchal pictorial codes that define and limit female identity."

The National Museum of Women in the Arts, in Washington, D.C., has held exhibitions of the artist books Edelson has made in Book as Art shows. In 1993, The Last Temptation of Lorena Bobbitt was an example of the way that Edelson created dramatic images of women. Firsthand: Photographs by Mary Beth Edelson, 1973-1993 and Shooter Series was published in 1993 at the time of two exhibitions. Many of the books that bear her name are exhibition books. (Note: More than 100 exhibition books were published about Mary Beth Edelson's work.)

== Awards ==
DePauw University gave her an Honorary Doctorate of Fine Arts in 1993. She received grants from the Andy Warhol Foundation for the Visual Arts, the Pollock-Krasner Foundation in 2000, and the National Endowment for the Arts in 2000 and 2006. She received a residency to Yaddo, which offers live-in programs on a 400-acre estate in Saratoga Springs, New York for 200 writers, visual artists, and musicians each year.
