= Feminist art movement in the United States =

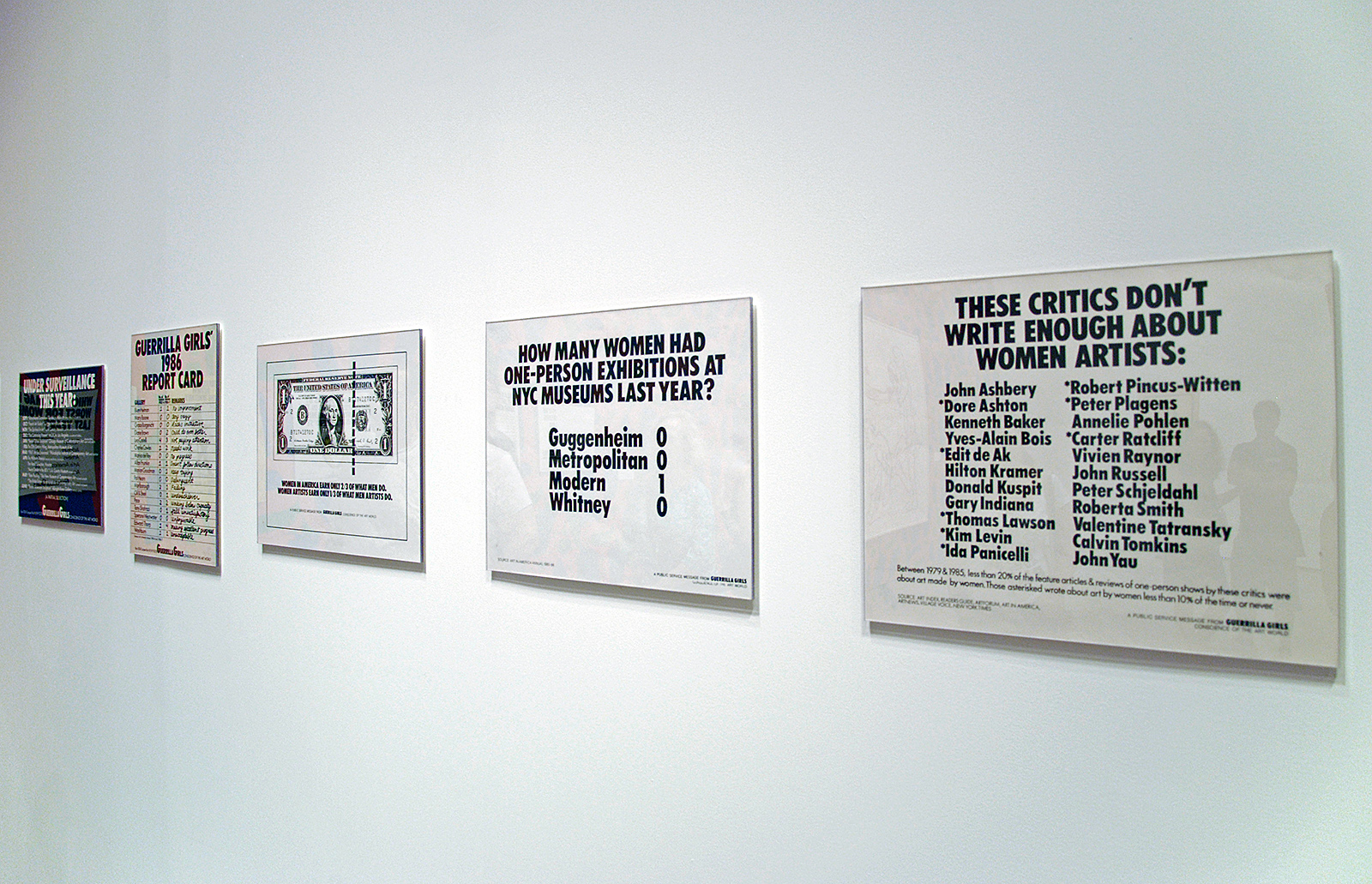
Guerilla Girls exhibit, Museum of Modern Art (MoMA)

The feminist art movement in the United States began in the early 1970s and sought to promote the study, creation, understanding and promotion of women's art. First-generation feminist artists include Judy Chicago, Miriam Schapiro, Suzanne Lacy, Judith Bernstein, Sheila de Bretteville, Mary Beth Edelson, Carolee Schneeman, Joan Snyder, Rachel Rosenthal, and many other women. They were part of the Feminist art movement in the United States in the early 1970s to develop feminist writing and art. The movement spread quickly through museum protests in both New York City (May 1970) and Los Angeles (June 1971), via an early network called W.E.B. (West-East Bag) that disseminated news of feminist art activities from 1971 to 1973 in a nationally circulated newsletter, and at conferences such as the West Coast Women's Artists Conference held at California Institute of the Arts (January 21–23, 1972) and the Conference of Women in the Visual Arts, at the Corcoran School of Art in Washington, D.C. (April 20–22, 1972).

== 1970s ==
For us, there weren't women in the galleries and museums, so we formed our own galleries, we curated our own exhibitions, we formed our own publications, we mentored one another, we even formed schools for feminist art. We examined the content of the history of art, and we began to make different kinds of art forms based on our experiences as women. So it was both social and something even beyond; in our case, it came back into our own studios.

— Joyce Kozloff

The Feminist Art Movement of the 1970s, within the second wave of feminism, "was a major watershed in women's history and the history of art" and "the personal is political" was its slogan.

=== Key activities ===
==== Maintenance Art—Proposal for an Exhibition ====
In 1969 Mierle Laderman Ukeles wrote a manifesto entitled Maintenance Art—Proposal for an Exhibition, challenging the domestic role of women and proclaiming herself a "maintenance artist". Maintenance, for Ukeles, is the realm of human activities that keep things going, such as cooking, cleaning and child-rearing and her performances in the 1970s included the cleaning of art galleries. Her first performance called Touch Sanitation was from 1979 to 1980.

==== Art Workers' Coalition demands equal representation for women ====
A demand for equality in representation for female artists was codified in the Art Workers' Coalition's (AWC) Statement of Demands, which was developed in 1969 and published in definitive form in March 1970. The AWC was set up to defend the rights of artists and force museums and galleries to reform their practices. While the coalition sprung up as a protest movement following Greek kinetic sculptor Panagiotis "Takis" Vassilakis's physical removal of his work Tele-Sculpture (1960) from a 1969 exhibition at the Museum of Modern Art, New York, it quickly issued a broad list of demands to "art museums in general".

Alongside calls for free admission, better representation of ethnic minorities, late openings and an agreement that galleries would not exhibit an artwork without the artist's consent, the AWC demanded that museums "encourage female artists to overcome centuries of damage done to the image of the female as an artist by establishing equal representation of the sexes in exhibitions, museum purchases and on selection committees'".

==== Initial feminist art classes ====
The first women's art class was taught in the fall of 1970 at Fresno State College, now California State University, Fresno, by artist Judy Chicago. It became the Feminist Art Program, a full 15-unit program, in the Spring of 1971. This was the first feminist art program in the United States. Fifteen students studied under Chicago at Fresno State College: Dori Atlantis, Susan Boud, Gail Escola, Vanalyne Green, Suzanne Lacy, Cay Lang, Karen LeCocq, Jan Lester, Chris Rush, Judy Schaefer, Henrietta Sparkman, Faith Wilding, Shawnee Wollenman, Nancy Youdelman, and Cheryl Zurilgen. Together, as the Feminist Art Program, these women rented and refurbished an off-campus studio at 1275 Maple Avenue in downtown Fresno. Here they collaborated on art, held reading groups, and discussion groups about their life experiences which then influenced their art. Later, Judy Chicago and Miriam Schapiro reestablished the Feminist Art Program (FAP) at California Institute of the Arts. After Chicago left for Cal Arts, the class at Fresno State College was continued by Rita Yokoi from 1971 to 1973, and then by Joyce Aiken in 1973, until her retirement in 1992. (Note: Aiken opened the all-women's co-op Gallery 25 with her students, developed the Fresno Art Museum's Council of 100 and the Distinguished Women Artist Series, which helped develop programming and exhibitions about women at the museum.)

The Fresno Feminist Art Program served as a model for other feminist art efforts, such as Womanhouse, a collaborative feminist art exhibition and the first project produced after the Feminist Art Program moved to the California Institute of the Arts in the fall of 1971. Womanhouse existed in 1972, was organized by Judy Chicago and Miriam Schapiro, and was the first public exhibition of feminist art. Womanhouse, like the Fresno project, also developed into a feminist studio space and promoted the concept of collaborative women's art.

The Feminist Studio Workshop was founded in Los Angeles in 1973 by Judy Chicago, Arlene Raven, and Sheila Levrant de Bretteville as a two-year feminist art program. Women from the program were instrumental in finding and creating the Woman's Building, the first independent center to showcase women's art and culture. Galleries existed there for the entire history of the organization and that was a major venue for exhibiting feminist art.

Art historian Arlene Raven established the Feminist Art Program in Los Angeles.

==== Why Have There Been No Great Women Artists? ====
In 1971, the art historian Linda Nochlin published the article "Why Have There Been No Great Women Artists?" in Woman in Sexist Society, which was later reprinted in ArtNews, where she claimed that there were no "great" women artists at that time, nor in history. By omission, this inferred that artists like Georgia O'Keeffe and Mary Cassatt were not considered great. She stated why she felt that there were no great women artists and what organizational and institutional changes needed to take place to create better opportunities for women.

The author Lucy Lippard and others identified three tasks to further the understanding and promotion of works by women:

- Find and present current and historic art works by women
- Develop a more informal language for writing about art by women
- Create theories about the meanings behind women's art and create a history of their works.

==== Some Living American Women Artists / Last Supper ====
Mary Beth Edelson's Some Living American Women Artists / Last Supper (1972) appropriated Leonardo da Vinci's The Last Supper, with the heads of notable women artists collaged over the heads of Christ and his apostles. The artists collaged over the heads of Christ and his apostles in Some Living American Women Artists / Last Supper include Lynda Benglis, Louise Bourgeois, Elaine de Kooning, Helen Frankenthaler, Nancy Graves, Lila Katzen, Lee Krasner, Georgia O'Keeffe, Louise Nevelson, Yoko Ono, M. C. Richards, Alma Thomas, and June Wayne. As well, other women artists have their image shown in the border of the piece; in all, 82 women artists are part of the whole image. This image, addressing the role of religious and art historical iconography in the subordination of women, became "one of the most iconic images of the feminist art movement."

==== Approaches ====
In California, the approach to improve the opportunities for women artists focused on creating venues, such as the Woman's Building and the Feminist Studio Workshop (FSW), located with the Woman's Building. Gallery spaces, feminist magazine offices, a bookstore, and a cafe were some of the key uses of the Feminist Studio Workshop.

Organizations like A.I.R. Gallery and Women Artists in Revolution (WAR) were formed in New York to provide greater opportunity for female artists and protest for to include works of women artist in art venues that had very few women represented, like Whitney Museum and the Museum of Modern Art. In 1970 there was a 23 percent increase in the number of women artists, and the previous year there was a 10 percent increase, due to Whitney Annual (later Whitney Biennial) protests.

The New York Feminist Art Institute opened in June 1979 at 325 Spring Street in the Port Authority Building. The founding members and the initial board of directors were Nancy Azara, Miriam Schapiro, Selena Whitefeather, Lucille Lessane, Irene Peslikis and Carol Stronghilos. A board of advisers was established of accomplished artists, educators and professional women. For instance, feminist writer and arts editor at Ms. Magazine Harriet Lyons was an adviser from its start.

==== Three Weeks in May ====
In 1977, Suzanne Lacy and collaborator Leslie Labowitz combined performance art with activism in Three Weeks in May on the steps of Los Angeles City Hall. The performance, which included a map of rapes in the city, and self-defense classes, highlighted sexual violence against women.

==== "Art Hysterical Notions of Progress and Culture" ====
Valerie Jaudon and Joyce Kozloff co-authored the widely anthologized "Art Hysterical Notions of Progress and Culture" (1978), in which they explained how they thought sexist and racist assumptions underlaid Western art history discourse. They reasserted the value of ornamentation and aesthetic beauty - qualities assigned to the feminine sphere.

=== Organizations and efforts ===
Year	Title	Event	Comments
1969	Women Artists in Revolution (WAR)	Protest	Women Artists in Revolution, initially a group within the Art Workers' Coalition, protested the lack of representation of women artists' works in museums in 1969, and operated only for a few years. Its members formed the Women's Interart Center. (Note: Women Artists in Revolution (WAR) formed to address the under representation of women artist's work in museums. In 1969 the published a list of demands, including "Museums should encourage female artists to overcome the centuries of damage done to the image of the female as an artist by establishing equal representation of the sexes in shows, museum purchases, and on selection committees.")
1970	Women's Interart Center	Founded	The Women's Interart Center in New York, founded by 1970 in New York City, is still in operation. The Women Artists in Revolution group evolved into the Women's Interart Center, which was a workshop that fostered multidisciplinary approaches, an alternative space and community center - the first of its kind in New York.
1970	Ad Hoc Women Artists' Committee	Founded	The Ad Hoc Women Artists' Committee (AWC) formed (Note: Lippard said that the group was founded in 1971.) to address the Whitney Museum's exclusion of women artists but expanded its focus over time. Committee members included Lucy Lippard, Faith Ringgold and others. The Women's Art Registry was created in 1970 to provide information about artists and their works and "counter curatorial bias and ignorance." It was maintained in several locations after the group disbanded in 1971. The registry, a model for other resource initiatives, is now maintained at Rutgers University's Mabel Smith Douglass Library.
1971	Los Angeles Council of Women Artists	Protest	In response to the 1971 Art and Technology exhibition at the Los Angeles County Museum of Art (LACMA), an ad hoc group of women organized, calling themselves the Los Angeles Council of Women Artists. They researched the number of women included in exhibitions at LACMA and issued a June 15, 1971 report, in which they protested sexual inequality in the artworld and that lack of art works from women at the museum's "Art and Technology" exhibition. They set a precedent for the Guerrilla Girls and other feminist groups.
1971	Where We At (WWA)	Founded	Women artists of color also began organizing, founding groups such as the African American group Where We At (WWA) and the Chicana group Las Mujeres Muralistas in order to gain visibility for artists who had been excluded or marginalized on the basis of both their sex and racial or ethnic identity.
1972	A.I.R. Gallery	Founded	A collective gallery formed in New York and remains in operation. (Note: Collective galleries such as A.I.R. Gallery in New York (1972–present) and Artemesia in Chicago were formed to provide visibility for art by feminist artists. The strength of the feminist movement allowed for the emergence and visibility of many new types of work by women but also helped facilitate a range of new practices by men.)
1972	Women's Caucus for Art	Founded	Women's Caucus for Art, an offshoot of the College Art Association, was founded in 1972 at the San Francisco Conference. A WCA conference is held annually and there are chapters in most areas of the U.S.
1972	Women's Video Festival	Held festivals	The Women's Video Festival was held yearly for a number of years in New York City. Many women artists continue to organize working groups, collectives, and nonprofit galleries in various locales around the world.
1973	Washington Women's Arts Center	Founded	Washington, DC, an artist-run inter-arts center opened with exhibits, writing workshops, a newsletter and quarterly literary journal Womansphere, as well as business workshops, lectures including Kathryn Anne Porter's final public lecture. The center operated through 1991. Founders included artists Barbara Frank, Janis Goodman, Kathryn Butler, and Sarah Hyde, writer Ann Slayton Leffler and art historian Josephine Withers.
1973	The Woman's Building	Founded	The Woman's Building in Los Angeles, CA was the first independent center for women's culture. It included the Feminist Studio Workshop, which was founded by Sheila Levrant de Bretteville, art historian Arlene Raven, and Judy Chicago in 1973. (Note: Many of the feminist artists and designers from CalArts joined other feminist artists at the Woman's Building, an important center of the west coast feminist artist movement in the 1970s and 1980s in which meetings, workshops, performances, and exhibitions regularly took place. Womanspace Gallery relocated there. During the first year, there were national conferences on feminist film, writing, ceramics, among others.) It closed in 1991.
1973	Womanspace	Founded	Womanspace was an artist‐run gallery that opened to the public on January 27, 1973, in a converted laundromat in Los Angeles. It resulted from the energy and ideas made tangible by the work of the Los Angeles Council of Women Artists, Womanhouse, the West Coast Women Artists conference, and other feminist actions happening throughout the city. According to the first issue of Womanspace Journal (February/March 1973), the founders included Lucy Adelman, Miki Benoff, Sherry Brody, Carole Caroompas, Judy Chicago, Max Cole, Judith Fried, Gretchen Glicksman (director of Womanspace), Elyse Grinstein, Linda Levi, Joan Logue, Mildred Monteverdi, Beverly O'Neill, Fran Raboff, Rachel Rosenthal, Betye Saar, Miriam Schapiro, Wanda Westcoast, Faith Wilding, and Connie Zehr. Womanspace moved to the Woman's Building later in 1973, and closed in 1974.
1973	Artemisia Gallery	Founded	A collective gallery formed in Chicago.
1973	Las Mujeres Muralistas	Founded	Women artists of color also began organizing, founding groups such as the African American group Where We At (WWA) and the Chicana group Las Mujeres Muralistas in order to gain visibility for artists who had been excluded or marginalized on the basis of both their sex and racial or ethnic identity.
1973	Women's Art Registry of Minnesota	Founded	WARM started as a women's art collective in 1973 and ran the WARM Gallery in Minneapolis from 1976 to 1991.
1974	Women's Studio Workshop	Founded	Women's Studio Workshop (WSW) was founded in 1974 by Ann Kalmbach, Tatana Kellner, Anita Wetzel, and Barbara Leoff Burge as an alternative space for women artists to create new work, gain artistic experience, and develop new skills. To this day, WSW still operates artist residencies and internships for women-identified artists, in addition to public arts projects, educational programming for emerging and established artists, and much more.
1975	Spiderwoman Theater	Founded	The theater was created to tell stories from an urban perspective. It is named after the Hopi goddess of creation whose objective is to "assist humans in maintaining balance in all things."
1979	New York Feminist Art Institute	Founded	Founding members: Nancy Azara, Lucille Lessane, Miriam Schapiro, Irene Peslikis
1985	The Woman's Salon for Literature in New York	Founded	Founded by Gloria Feman Orenstein. it lasted for more than 10 years and hosted such important artists as Judy Chicago and Kate Millett.

=== Publications ===
The Feminist Art Journal was a feminist art publication that was produced from 1972 to 1977, and was the first stable, widely read journal of its kind. Beginning in 1975 there were scholarly publications about feminism, feminist art and historic women's art, most notably Through the Flower: My Struggle as a Woman Artist by Judy Chicago; and Against Our Will: Men, Women and Rape (1975) by Susan Brownmiller; Women Artists News (1975–1992) by art critic Cynthia Navaretta and edited by Judy Seigel; Woman Artists: 1550-1950 (1976) about Linda Nochlin and Ann Sutherland Harris's exhibition; From the Center: Feminist Essays in Women's Art (1976) by Lucy Lippard; Of Woman Born, by Adrienne Rich, When God Was a Woman (1976) by Merlin Stone; By Our Own Hands (1978) by Faith Wilding; Gyn/Ecology (1978) by Mary Daly; and Woman and Nature by Susan Griffin.

In 1977, both Chrysalis and Heresies: A Feminist Publication on Art and Politics began publication. (Note: Chrysalis Magazine (1977–80), was organized out of the Los Angeles Woman's Building.)

== 1980s ==
Feminist art evolved during the 1980s, with a trend away from experiential works and social causes. Instead, there was a trend toward works based upon Postmodern theory and influenced by psychoanalysis. Inequal representation in the art world was a continuing issue. According to Judy Chicago in a 1981 interview,

As we know, by and large women's life experience has not been represented. It has been men's life experience that has made up the body of art history. At least, as we know it now; and there are all these categories and words that diminish women's expression. So that if it's done by a man, it's "high art"; if it's done by a woman, it's "decorative". If it's done by a man, it's "art"; if it's done by a woman, it's "political". There's all these words, you know? For example, images by men, of women are "art"; images by women of men are "political". Abstract patterns by men are "art"; abstract patterns by women in fabric are "decorative"; they're called quilts. So there's all these kind of double standards and all these kind of words that prevent women's experience from entering—even when they express it—from entering the mainstream of art.

=== Key activities ===
==== Guerrilla Girls ====
Guerrilla Girls was formed by 7 women artists in the spring of 1985 in response to the Museum of Modern Art's exhibition "An International Survey of Recent Painting and Sculpture", which opened in 1984. The exhibition was the inaugural show in the MoMA's newly renovated and expanded building, and was planned to be a survey of the most important contemporary artists.

The Guerrilla Girls have researched sexism and created artworks at the request of various people and institutions, among others, the Istanbul Modern, Istanbul, Witte de With Center for Contemporary Arts, Rotterdam and Fundación Bilbao Arte Fundazioa, Bilbao. They have also partnered with Amnesty International, contributing pieces to a show under the organization's "Protect the Human" initiative.

==== Mass communication ====
Mass communication is "the process by which a person, group of people, or large organization creates a message and transmits it through some type of medium to a large, anonymous, heterogeneous audience." Women such as Barbara Kruger and Jenny Holzer used forms of graphic mass communication such as refined slogans and graphics to increase awareness of the inequity faced by women artists.

Kiki Smith

During the 1970s Kiki Smith was one of the many artists involved in the collaborative projects. As the art scene became more politicized in the 1980s, Kiki Smith's art work also became more political as well. Her work started "involving issues like abortion, race and AIDS." When asked if she considered herself a feminist artist, Smith responded:

Yes, I would say that generationally I am, and I would say that without the feminist movement I wouldn't exist; and an enormous amount of the artwork that we take for granted wouldn't exist; and a lot of the subject matter that we assume can be encompassed by art wouldn't exist. The feminist movement exponentially expanded what art is, and how we look at art, and who is considered to be included in the discourse of art-making. I think that it caused a tremendous, radical change. You don't want to have a cultural notion that one specific gender embodies creativity. All humanity – and all aspects of gender and sexuality and how people define themselves – are inherently creative. It's against the interests of the culture at large not to embrace feminism as a model, just like many other models of liberation, because they don't only liberate women, they liberate everybody.

==== Sister Serpents ====
Sister Serpents was a radical feminist art collective that began as a small group women in Chicago in the summer of 1989, as a direct response to the Webster v. Reproductive Health Services Supreme Court decision. Their goal as a collective was to empower women and to increase awareness of women's issues through radical art, and to use art as a weapon to battle misogyny.

=== Publications ===
- Feminist Art Journal
- Genders: Feminist Art and (Post)Modern Anxieties
- M/E/A/N/I/N/G had 20 issues (1986–1996) and 5 on-line issues (2002–2011)
- Woman's Art Journal (1980–present)
- Heresies
- LTTR
- Meridians
- The Journal of Women and Performance

== 1990s ==
=== Key activities ===
==== Bad Girls ====
Bad Girls (Part I) and Bad Girls (Part II) were a 1994 pair of exhibitions at New Museum in New York, curated by Marcia Tucker. A companion exhibition, Bad Girls West was curated by Marcia Tanner and exhibited at UCLA's Wright Gallery the same year.

==== Sexual Politics: Judy Chicago's The Dinner Party in Feminist Art History ====
Sexual Politics: Judy Chicago's The Dinner Party in Feminist Art History, a 1996 exhibition and text curated and written by Amelia Jones, re-exhibited Judy Chicago's The Dinner Party for the first time since 1988. It was presented by the UCLA Armand Hammer Museum.

Riot Grrrl

The Riot grrrl movement was focused mostly on music, but the DIY aspect of this scene included feminist knowledge in forms of underground zines, which included poems, articles, comics, etc.

=== Publications ===
- n.paradoxa (1998–present)

== 2000s ==
=== Key activities ===
==== WACK! Art and the Feminist Revolution ====
The 2007 exhibition, WACK! Art and the Feminist Revolution, focused on the feminist art movement. It was organized by the Museum of Contemporary Art, Los Angeles and traveled to PS1 Contemporary Art Center in New York. WACK! featured by 120 artists from 21 countries, covering the period of 1965–1980.

==== A Studio of Their Own ====
A Studio of Their Own: The Legacy of the Fresno Feminist Experiment was performed on the California State University, Fresno campus at the Phebe Conley Art Gallery in 2009. It was a retrospective that paid homage to the women from the 1970s who were part of the first women's art program.

==== The Feminist Art Project ====
The Feminist Art Project website and information portal was founded at Rutgers University in 2006. A resource for artists and scholars in the United States, it publishes a calendar of events and runs conferences, discussions and education projects. It describes itself as "a strategic intervention against the ongoing erasure of women from the cultural record".

=== Feminist art curatorial practices ===
==== History ====
Feminist art curating practices are within a museumism genre, which is a deconstructing of the museum space by curator/artist where the museum looks at itself or the artist/curator looks at the museum.

"If artists as curators of their own exhibition is no longer uncommon, neither is the artist-created museum or collection ... These artists use museological practices to confront the ways in which museums rewrite history through the politics of collecting and presentation ... However, their work often inadvertently reasserts the validity of the museum" (Corrin, 1994, p. 5).

Katy Deepwell documents feminist curating practice and feminist art history with a theoretical foundation that feminist curating is not biologically determinate.

==== Characteristics ====
Feminist art curatorial practices are collaborative and reject the notion of an artist as an individual creative genius.

==== Examples ====
- The Out of Here exhibition is an example of feminist art curatorial practice.
- Womanhouse
- Teatro Chicana: A Collective Memoir and Selected Plays highlights El Movimiento and Chicana women's civil rights movements representing their varied communities and histories.

== 2010s ==
=== Key activities ===
!Women Art Revolution

The documentary film !Women Art Revolution was played at New York's IFC Center beginning June 1, 2011, before opening around the country.

Woman's Building

The Los Angeles Woman's Building was the subject of a major exhibition in 2012 at the Ben Maltz Gallery at Otis College of Art and Design called Doin' It in Public, Feminism and Art at the Woman's Building. It included oral histories on video, emphemera, and artists' projects. It was part of the Getty initiative Pacific Standard Time.

Stop Telling Women To Smile

Stop Telling Women To Smile was an ongoing, traveling series that started in Fall of 2012. Artist Tatyana Fazlalizadeh, started this project in Brooklyn, NYC, but had also been in Chicago, Paris, and Mexico City. Street art such as STWTS is a modern way of mass communication art.

"Gallery Tally"

In 2013, Michol Hebron started the "Gallery Tally" project, where Hebron had different galleries across Los Angeles and New York make posters showing the uneven representation in the art world. She found that about 70 percent of artists represented in these two cities are men. Hebron has extended this project outside of L.A., and now continues the project all over the states, with updates to her blog.In 2015, Hebron went through every cover published from Artforum. Since 1962, there have been 526 different monthly covers. Hebron found only 18percent feature art by women, and male artists made 74 percent of the covers.

"Guarded"

"Guarded" was a photography project by artist Taylor Yocom in 2015 for which Yocom photographed students from University of Iowa, showing what these women carried with them when they had to walk alone at night.

Now Be Here

Now Be Here was a project from August 28, 2016, where 733 female and female identifying women came together in Los Angeles to be photographed together to show solidarity. The project continued with Now Be Here #2 at the Brooklyn Museum on October 23, 2016, and Now Be Here #3 at the Pérez Art Museum Miami (PAMM) on December 10, 2016.

The Future is Female

The Future is Female art exhibit located within the 21C Museum and Hotel in Louisville, Kentucky opened its doors just following the most recent presidential election in the United States of America and features feminist art works that operate to epitomize the experience of womanhood while simultaneously addressing larger global issues. The exhibit highlights the artwork of handful of feminist artists including Vibha Galhotra, Alison Saar, Carrie Mae Weems, Michele Pred, Frances Goodman, Kiki Smith, and Sanell Aggenbach who emerged in the wake of the second wave Feminist Arts Movement.

Women's Invitational Exhibition 2017

The Women's Invitational Exhibition is an art exhibit that features the works from minority women artists. The entire gallery showcases only a select few artists. However, each individual woman shows multitude of different topics via a variety of mediums.

Hands On

HANDS ON is collection of works by Karen Lederer made in 2017. Works within the collection date from 2015 to 2017. The art was made in response to political debates about women.

Faith Wilding: Fearful Symmetries

In 2018, Carnegie Mellon University hosted a retrospective of Faith Wilding's artwork, which became a traveling exhibit.

== See also ==
- Feminist art criticism
- Feminist art movement
- Feminist pornography
- Feminist Porn Award
- Feminism in the United States
- Gender equality
- Go Topless Day
- Pattern and Decoration art movement, related to feminist art movement
- Sex-positive feminism
- Where We At Black Women Artists (WWA)
