= Sherry Brody =

American artist (1932–2015)

- Born: November 14, 1932; Santa Monica, California
- Died: January 30, 2015 (aged 82)
- Known for: Womanhouse Project

Sherry Brody (1932 – 2015) was an American artist and pioneering member of the feminist art movement. Brody is known for her work on the Womanhouse project. Her sculpture, The Dollhouse, is in the Smithsonian Museum of American Art collection.

== About ==
Sherry Brody was born on November 14, 1932 in Santa Monica, California. She died January 30, 2015.

== Education ==
Brody studied at California Institute of the Arts (CalArts). She was a teaching assistant for Miriam Schapiro, who established the school's Feminist Arts Program in the early 1970s with artist Judy Chicago.

== Career ==
In 1971 Brody was invited by Judy Chicago and Miriam Schapiro to participate in Womanhouse. Brody collaborated with Schapiro to create The Dollhouse. This included a room within Womanhouse and a sculptural object in the form of an actual dollhouse featuring belongings gathered from women around the world in six different rooms: a parlor, a kitchen, a Hollywood star’s bedroom, a “harem” room, a nursery, and, an artist’s studio. Dollhouse was one of the works in Womanhouse, the installation and performance space organized by Shapiro and Chicago and sponsored by CalArts in 1972.

Brody appears in the 1974 documentary by Johanna Demeriakas, Womanhouse.

In her 2006 article, "Revisiting 'Womanhouse': Welcome to the (Deconstructed) 'Dollhouse'," Temma Balducci states, "The centerpiece of The Dollhouse room, and one of the key elements of Womanhouse, was Sherry Brody and Miriam Schapiro's The Dollhouse. The work subverts the traditional gender expectations perpetuated through a seemingly innocuous children's plaything. She continues, "The Dollhouse can be seen as symbolic of the whole, alluding to the use of play found throughout the project. . . The Dollhouse also suggests a possible source for the name Womanhouse." and "The Dollhouse, like Womanhouse, addresses the construction of gender." "Through parody and exaggeration, the size rooms in The Dollhouse critique the roles that white, middle-class women in mid-twentieth-century America were expected to perform and can be seen as a model for reading the entire Womanhouse project."

In 2019 the Womanhouse project of which Brody made a significant contribution, was included in The 25 Works of Art That Define the Contemporary Age by the New York Times.

The 2020 MOCA exhibition With Pleasure: Pattern and Decoration in American Art 1972–1985 included Brody and Schapiro's Dollhouse sculpture.

== Significant works ==
- The Dollhouse Room – by Sherry Brody, Miriam Schapiro. According to Schapiro, The Dollhouse Room juxtaposes themes of "supposed safety and comfort in the home" with "terrors existing within its walls".
- The Dollhouse – The Dollhouse serves as the centerpiece of The Dollhouse Room. It is a six-room miniature house. The artist's studio room contains a miniature nude man atop a pedestal, with an erect penis and bananas at his feet. Downstairs, a miniature woman sits at her dressing table. There are many monsters present in the dollhouse, despite its familiar domestic aspects. To the left of the artist's studio is a nursery with a baby replaced by a monster. Outside the window, peering in, is a grizzly bear. Downstairs, a group of ten men stare in through the kitchen window. A rattlesnake is curled on the parlor floor. The Dollhouse was acquired by the Smithsonian Institution in 1995 and is the only publicly available piece of Womanhouse.
- Lingerie Pillows – created by Sherry Brody. The pillows were sewn from underwear and bras and displayed on a small tabletop. Miriam Schapiro related a story that the curator of LACMA came to have a tour of Womanhouse. In the Dollhouse Room, he picked up one of the pillows and when he realized that he was holding, he was embarrassed. Schapiro recalled that everyone in the room had laughed, but upon reflection she wished that she had questioned his aversion to something delicate, intimate, and feminine.
- Dining Room – by Beth Bachenheimer, Sherry Brody, Karen LeCocq, Robin Mitchell, Miriam Schapiro, Faith Wilding. The Dining Room features a crown molding of lifelike painted fruit. A mural, based on a 19th-century still life by Anna Peale, is displayed on a wall behind the dining room table. The table itself features a bread dough sculpture, turkey, ham, pecan pie, vinyl salad bowl, vinyl wine glasses and a wine bottle. A chandelier hangs above the table. Below the table, a stenciled-rug is painted directly onto the floor. Dining Room is the most collaborative project in Womanhouse, utilizing the efforts of seven women to complete. It is meant to express a generous, bountiful and romantic aura.
