= Jan Oxenberg =

American film producer

- Born: 1950 (age 75–76); Brooklyn, New York, United States
- Education: Barnard College, California Institute of the Arts
- Known for: Feminist Lesbian Films, Film Production

Jan Oxenberg (born 1950) is an American film producer, director, editor, and screenwriter. She is known for her work in lesbian feminist films and in television.

== Career ==
Oxenberg was born in Brooklyn, New York in 1950.

She attended Barnard College for two years where she was active in the experimental college, a collaborative, co-living, and self-directed schooling experiment between Barnard and Columbia University starting in 1968. Oxenberg transferred to California Institute of the Arts (CalArts) and initially she studied feminist art with Judy Chicago and Miriam Shapiro, but later transferring into the CalArts film school. In 1972, Oxenberg was one of the many participants in Womanhouse, the first feminist art installation and performance art (specifically within the art pieces - Three Women, Birth Trilogy, Necco Wafers).

In the 1970s, she was involved with ELF (education liberation front), a traveling educational resource, carrying information and books on liberation movements, racism, ecology and more. Around 1974, she was active in producing a radio series called "Lesbian Sisters" on KPFK Los Angeles.

She has also worked as a producer and writer on Pretty Little Liars. Other credits include Nothing Sacred, Cold Case, Kidnapped, In Plain Sight, and Chicago Hope.

Since 2013, Oxenberg has been adapting James Ellroy's memoir, My Dark Places for a screenplay and film production by Myriad Pictures.

== Personal life ==
Oxenberg is Jewish, and openly lesbian. Oxenberg has been out as a lesbian since the early portion of the second wave feminist movement. For many years, she dated musician Sonia Wieder-Atherton.

== Filmography ==
Film
Year	Title	Type	Role	Notes
1973	Home Movie	short film	film director	This film is regarded as one of the first feminist lesbian films and was shown at the Womanspace Gallery in 1973. It revisits old home movies but with a queer narrative.
1974	I'm Not One of 'Em	short film	film director	
1975	A Comedy in Six Unnatural Acts		film producer, film director, film editor	
1975	Films by Jan Oxenberg	short film	film director, film editor	
1975	Woman to Woman	documentary	sound	
1986	Rate It X	documentary	sound	
1992	Thank You and Good Night	documentary	film producer, film director	This documentary film is centered around a portrait of Oxenberg's dying grandmother, and about facing death.

Television
Year(s)	Title	Type	Role	Notes
1997	Relativity	television series drama	writer	Oxenberg wrote the 1997 Relativity episode that featured the first kiss between two lesbian characters on American primetime television.
1998–1999	Chicago Hope	television series drama	film producer	(3 episodes)
1999–2001	Once and Again	television series drama	film producer, writer	(43 episodes) She wrote for Once and Again, which had a pioneering storyline of a lesbian teenage couple.
2001	The Education of Max Bickford		film producer	
2002	Robbery Homicide Division		film producer	
2003	Mister Sterling		film producer	(3 episodes)
2003–2004	Cold Case	television series police procedural	film producer	(22 episodes)
2006–2007	Kidnapped		film producer	(12 episodes)
2008	Long Island Confidential		film producer	
2011	In Plain Sight		film producer	(2 episodes)
2013	Pretty Little Liars		film producer	(3 episodes)

== See also ==
- List of female film and television directors
- List of lesbian filmmakers
- List of LGBT-related films directed by women
