= Feminist Art Program =

The Feminist Art Program (FAP) was a college-level art program for women developed in 1970 by artist Judy Chicago and continued by artists Rita Yokoi, Miriam Schapiro, and others. The FAP began at Fresno State College, as a way to address gender inequities in art education, and the art world in general. In 1971, Judy Chicago and Miriam Schapiro brought the FAP to the newly formed California Institute of the Arts, leaving Rita Yokoi to run the Fresno FAP until her retirement in 1992. The FAP at California Institute of the Arts was active until 1976. The students in the Feminist Art Program read women writers, studied women artists, and made art about being a woman based on group consciousness-raising sessions. Often, the program was separate from the rest of the art school to allow the women to develop in a greenhouse-like environment and away from discerning critiques. While the separatist ideology has been critiqued as reinforcing gender, the FAP has made a lasting impression on feminist art which can be seen in retrospectives, group exhibitions, and creative re-workings of the original projects.

== Fresno Feminist Art Program ==
The original Feminist Art Program was developed by artist Judy Chicago. The first such program was launched in the fall of 1970 at Fresno State College, now California State University, Fresno. In the spring of 1971, It became a full 15-unit program. This was the first feminist art program in the United States. Fifteen students studied under Chicago at Fresno State College: Dori Atlantis, Susan Boud, Gail Escola, Vanalyne Green, Suzanne Lacy, Cay Lang, Karen LeCocq, Jan Lester, Chris Rush, Judy Schaefer, Henrietta Sparkman, Faith Wilding, Shawnee Wollenman, Nancy Youdelman, and Cheryl Zurilgen. Artist Vicki Hall worked as Judy Chicago's teaching assistant. Together, as the Feminist Art Program, these women rented and refurbished an off-campus studio at 1275 Maple Avenue in downtown Fresno. Here they collaborated on art and held reading groups, and discussion groups about their life experiences which then influenced their art.

The Fresno Feminist Art Program served as a model for other feminist art efforts, such as Womanhouse, a collaborative feminist art exhibition and the first project produced after the Feminist Art Program moved to the California Institute of the Arts in the fall of 1971. Sheila de Bretteville and Arlene Raven also taught in that program. Womanhouse, like the Fresno project, also developed into a feminist studio space and promoted the concept of collaborative women's art.

After Chicago left for CalArts, the class at Fresno State College was continued by Rita Yokoi from 1971 to 1973, and then by Joyce Aiken in 1973, until her retirement in 1992. (Note: Aiken opened the all-women's co-op Gallery 25 with her students, developed the Fresno Art Museum's Council of 100 and the Distinguished Women Artist Series, which helped develop programming and exhibitions about women at the museum.)

== Feminist Art Program (FAP) at CalArts ==
Later, Chicago and Miriam Schapiro reestablished the Feminist Art Program (FAP) at California Institute of the Arts.

The Feminist Art Program (FAP) was created by Judy Chicago and Miriam Schapiro at the California Institute of the Arts in Valencia, California, in 1971. Building on the "radical educational techniques" that she had first tried out in her classes for women in 1970–1971, when she worked at Fresno State, Chicago and Schapiro made the program, the first of its kind accessible to women only. Chicago in particular felt she had to "redo" her education as an art historian, since she had been taught by men exclusively and considered that this background forced a male perspective on her as an artist and disallowed her from developing her "own forms, artistic language, and subject matter".

== Feminist Studio Workshop ==
The Feminist Studio Workshop was founded in Los Angeles in 1973 by Judy Chicago, Arlene Raven, and Sheila Levrant de Bretteville as a two-year feminist art program. Women from the program were instrumental in finding and creating the Woman's Building, the first independent center to showcase women's art and culture. Disillusioned with the male-dominated atmosphere at CalArts and desiring their own space, the faculty modeled their classes on a non-hierarchical structure and focused on training students in less traditional art forms such as performance art and graphic design. Chicago left the Feminist Studio Workshop in 1974 to work on The Dinner Party, and by the end of the decade, Raven and de Bretteville had left as well and the program was taken over by former students. However, enrollment in the Feminist Studio Workshop declined as the political climate changed and public funding decreased. The program closed in 1981, although the Woman's Building itself remained open until 1991.
