= Melissa Meyer =

American painter (born 1946)

Melissa Meyer (born May 4, 1946) is an American painter. The Wall Street Journal has referred to her as a "lighthearted Abstract Expressionist".

== Life and work ==
Meyer received a fellowship at the American Academy in Rome in 1980, two National Endowment for the Arts grants (1983, 1993), the National Academy 183rd Invitational Eric Isenburger Annual Award (2008), and a Pollock-Krasner Foundation Grant (2009). In the late 1970s Meyer and Miriam Schapiro collaborated on a Heresies article entitled femmage. (Note: The word "femmage," has been used: from the 1970s onwards by the artists Miriam Schapiro and Melissa Meyer (through merging 'feminine' and 'collage') to denote the activities of collage, assemblage, découpage and photomontage practised by women using "traditional women's techniques – sewing, piercing, hooking, cutting, appliquéing, cooking and the like …"; by the artist Louise Lidströmer, beginning circa 1994, with regard to a series of her paintings with this title, to mean a female celebration, tribute, or "homage paid by a woman"; or, more generally and particularly in French, to mean "homage paid to a woman.")

In 1997 her sketchbooks were published in facsimile by the Mezzanine Gallery of the Metropolitan Museum of Art.

Melissa Meyer's paintings and works on paper are in the collections of The Museum of Modern Art, The Metropolitan Museum of Art, The Brooklyn Museum, and The Jewish Museum,
