= Paula Harper =

American art historian

Paula Hays Harper (née Fish; November 17, 1930 – June 3, 2012) was an American art historian, credited as "one of the first art historians to bring a feminist perspective to the study of painting and sculpture". She co-authored a biography on the French impressionist Camille Pissarro and was a well-known contemporary art critic.

== Life and work ==
Paula Fish was born in Scituate, Massachusetts, an only child, and raised in Philadelphia. In her 20s she moved to New York City, where she was a dancer with the modern dance company Munt–Brooks Dance Studios (later known as "The Changing Scene"). After a dance-related injury she decided to study art history at Hunter College in New York and earned her bachelor's and master's degree. In 1976 she earned her PhD in art history from Stanford University, being one of the first graduate students of Linda Nochlin. Harper was married twice and never had children; she preferred using her two married names "Hays Harper" because of a dislike of her maiden name.

Harper was "instrumental" in the establishment of the Feminist Art Program at the California Institute of the Arts in the early 1970s. Harper is credited with conceiving Womanhouse, a 1972 art installation and "one of the biggest and most celebrated exhibitions of art by and about women ever assembled".

In 1981, she collaborated with Ralph E. Shikes on a comprehensive biography of the 19th-century French Impressionist Camille Pissarro. She taught at the University of Miami from 1983 until her retirement in 2011. She helped shape the Miami art scene and was a regular contributor and art critic in Art in America magazine and The Miami News.

Harper died at age 81 in Miami, Florida from complications of a rare skin cancer.

== Publications ==
- Hays Harper, Paula (Winter 1970–1971). "California Art for Peace: May 1970". Art Journal. 30. The College Art Association of America, Inc.
- Hays Harper, Paula (1978). Votes for Women? A Graphic Episode in the Battle of Sexes in Art and Architecture in the Service of Politics. Cambridge, Mass.: MIT Press. p. 156.
- Hays Harper, Paula (1981). Daumier's Clowns: Les Saltimbanques, Et Les Parades, New Biographical and Political Functions for a Nineteenth Century Myth (Outstanding Dissertations in the Fine Arts). New York: Garland Publishing. p. 211. ISBN 9780824039493.
- Harper, Paula; Shikes, Ralph (1980). Pissarro: His Life and Work. New York: Horizon Press. p. 362.
- Harper, Paula; Shikes, Ralph (1981). Pissarro, The Father of Impressionism (in German). Königstein: Athenäum. p. 333.
