= Belen Hotel =

- U.S. National Register of Historic Places
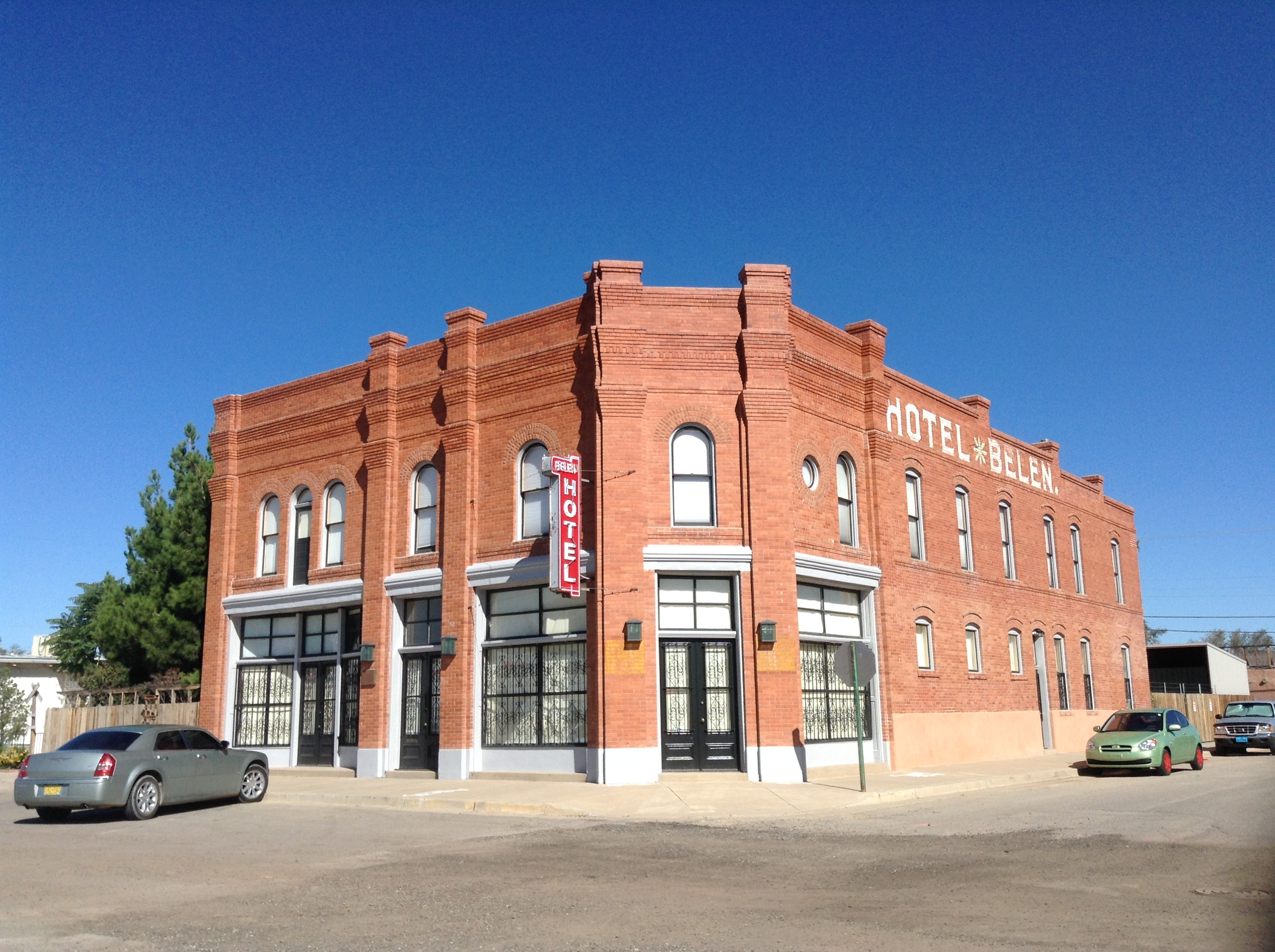

- Location within New Mexico Location within the United States
- Location: 200 Becker Ave., Belen, New Mexico
- Coordinates: 34°39′36″N 106°46′08″W
- Area: less than one acre
- Built: 1907
- Architectural style: Decorative Brick Style
- NRHP reference No.: 80002574
- Added to NRHP: November 12, 1980

The Belen Hotel, at 200 Becker Ave. in Belen, New Mexico, United States, was built in 1907. It was listed on the National Register of Historic Places in 1980.

It is a two-story red brick flat-roofed L-shaped building with a chamfered corner. The hotel primarily served Santa Fe Railroad personnel.

It was built for Mrs. Bertha Rutz, a German immigrant, who ran the hotel and its cafe until her death in 1953.

Since 1996 it has been the home of artist Judy Chicago and her husband Donald Woodman, who spent three years converting it into a home.
