= Karen LeCocq =

American artist (born 1949)

Karen LeCocq (born 1949) is an American artist. She is a nationally-known sculptor whose work combines organic materials and found objects.

== Biography ==
LeCocq was born in 1949 in Santa Rosa, California. She attended Fresno State College and was a student of Judy Chicago, visiting artist. In 1970, Chicago, along with 15 female students (LeCocq included) started the first feminist art program in the United States. LeCocq received a BA degree from Fresno State College in 1971. She attended California Institute of the Arts (CalArts) in Valencia, CA in 1972 where she participated in the Feminist Art Program developed by Judy Chicago and Miriam Schapiro. The first class project of this program was a group project called Womanhouse, an installation and performance piece. LeCocq and Nancy Youdelman created a room in Womanhouse they called “Leah’s Room” from Colette’s Chéri. They borrowed an antique dressing table and rug, made lace curtains and covered the bed with satin and lace to create the effect of a boudoir. They filled the closet with old-looking clothes and veiled hats, and wallpapered the walls to add a feeling of nostalgia. LeCocq sat at the dressing table dressed in a nineteenth-century-style costume as Léa, studiously applying make-up over and over and then removing it, replicating the character’s attempts to save her fading beauty.

LeCocq returned to Fresno State College where she received an MA degree in 1976.

LeCocq is a sculptor and a lecturer at the University of California, Merced in Merced, California.
