= Paul Brach =

American painter

- Born: March 13, 1924; New York City, New York
- Died: November 16, 2007 (aged 83); East Hampton, New York
- Known for: Painting
- Movement: Abstract Expressionism, Minimalism
- Spouse: Miriam Schapiro (m. 1946)

Paul Brach (March 13, 1924 - November 16, 2007) was an American abstract painter, as well as a lecturer and educator.

As an abstract painter Paul Brach exhibited his work in New York with the Leo Castelli Gallery, the Cordier & Eckstrom Gallery, and with the André Emmerich Gallery.

== Biography ==
Paul Brach was born in New York City and was raised in Brooklyn and the Bronx. He went to the University of Iowa where he studied painting with Grant Wood. He served in the US Army during World War II. After the war, he finished school in Iowa on the GI Bill. At the University of Iowa he met the artist Miriam Schapiro and in 1946 they married. By 1951 they moved back to New York City and befriended many of the artists in the downtown Abstract expressionist New York School, including Joan Mitchell, Larry Rivers, Knox Martin and Michael Goldberg.

He was associated with the New York print studio Atelier 17.

During the early 1960s Brach had part-time teaching jobs at The New School, Cooper Union, The Parsons School of Design and Cornell University's New York City Program.
In 1967 Brach and his wife Miriam Schapiro moved to Southern California. He became the Dean of the CalArts program in Los Angeles in 1969.

"In 1967 I was offered the chair of a new art department at the University of California at San Diego. After two years at UCSD, I became the founding dean of the School of Art at the California Institute of the Arts. I decided to come to [CalArts] because Los Angeles was more fun, and I could find my peers here. I mean there are artists like Bob Irwin, and Ed Kienholz, and Larry Bell, and people who I think are doing good work. And CalArts seems goofy enough. What really knocked me out was that the makers of Mary Poppins are inadvertently funding something that's going to make Easy Rider." CalArts quickly became one of the best art schools in the country.

In 1975 they returned to the New York art world. Brach became the chair of the Division of the Arts of Fordham University at Lincoln Center. Eventually he gave up teaching and administration and devoted himself to his painting. His work was represented by various galleries until 1998. In 1997, Brach was elected into the National Academy of Design.

In 1998, they moved permanently to East Hampton. "Although I was without a dealer until 2005, I was working well in my East Hampton studio. Elly and Len Flomenhaft, who were opening a gallery, knew and loved my work. Therefore, I am now a part of the Flomenhaft Gallery." He died in East Hampton November 16, 2007 of prostate cancer.

== Books ==
- Marika Herskovic, New York School Abstract Expressionists Artists Choice by Artists, (New York School Press, 2000.) ISBN 0-9677994-0-6
