= Arlene Raven =

American art historian (1944–2006)

- Arlene Raven's Portrait
- Born: Arlene Rubin; July 12, 1944; Baltimore, Maryland, U.S.
- Died: August 1, 2006 (aged 62); Brooklyn, New York, U.S.
- Education: George Washington University; Johns Hopkins University
- Occupations: Art historian, art critic, curator, and writer
- Years active: 1972–2006
- Notable work: Established the Los Angeles Woman's Building

Arlene Raven (Arlene Rubin: July 12, 1944, Baltimore, Maryland – August 1, 2006, Brooklyn, New York) was a feminist art historian, author, critic, educator, and curator. Raven was a co-founder of numerous feminist art organizations in Los Angeles in the 1970s.

== Life and work ==
Arlene Raven's parents were Joseph and Annette Rubin, middle-class Jewish-American parents, in Baltimore, Maryland. Her father was a bar owner, and her mother a homemaker.

Raven earned an Artium Baccalaureatus from Hood College in Maryland in 1965, then went on to complete graduate study. She earned an MFA in painting from George Washington University and completed a PhD in art history from Johns Hopkins University in 1975.

Raven was a major figure in the Feminist Art Movement and was part of an effort to educate women artists and provide them with opportunities to make and show work that was specifically about their experiences as women. In 1973, Raven co-founded the Feminist Studio Workshop with Judy Chicago and Sheila Levrant de Bretteville. The goal of the Feminist Studio Workshop, an independent art school ultimately housed in the Los Angeles Woman's Building, was to "come together as a community of working individuals whose work grows out of our shared experiences as women and our shared social context," and an emphasis was put on "cooperation, collaboration, and sisterhood." That same year, Raven co-founded The Center for Feminist Art Historical Studies with fellow Johns Hopkins-educated art historian Ruth Iskin. The center was dedicated to serious research on women artists, developing a feminist art historical methodology, and creating a slide archive of work by women. Raven also co-founded and edited the women's culture magazine Chrysalis. In 1976, she was a founding member of The Lesbian Art Project; she herself was a lesbian as well. Members explored lesbianism through artwork, researched lesbian artists of the past, such as the painter Romaine Brooks, and questioned the cultural meaning of the very term "lesbian." She was also a founder of the Women’s Caucus for Art.

In addition to the Feminist Studio Workshop, Raven also taught at the California Institute of the Arts, Maryland Institute College of Art, Parsons The New School for Design, UCLA, University of Southern California and The New School for Social Research. In the 1980s she became the chief art critic for the Village Voice.

She curated ten exhibitions, including ones for the Baltimore Museum of Art and the Long Beach Museum of Art. One notable exhibition was "At Home," "which brought together many of the artists and ideas she had championed for the previous decade."

In 2000, Raven became critic-in-residence at the Rinehart School of Sculpture at the Maryland Institute College of Art. In 2002, she received the Frank Jewett Mather Award for art criticism from the College Art Association.

Raven died of cancer at her home in Brooklyn, New York, on August 1, 2006, aged 62. She was survived by her father, her sister Phyllis [Gelman], and Nancy Grossman, her life partner of 23 years.

== Books ==
Raven authored nine books, including:

- Feminist Art Criticism: An Anthology (1988) (and editor) OCLC 581561464 ISBN 0835718786
- Crossing Over: Feminism and Art of Social Concern (1988) OCLC 901903194 ISBN 0835720179
- Art in the Public Interest (1989) OCLC 502660046 ISBN 0306805391
- New feminist criticism : art, identity, action (1994) OCLC 27816089 ISBN 0064309096

Monographs:

- Nancy Grossman (1991)
- June Wayne: Tunnel of the Senses (1997)
