= Miriam Schapiro =

Canadian artist (1923–2015)

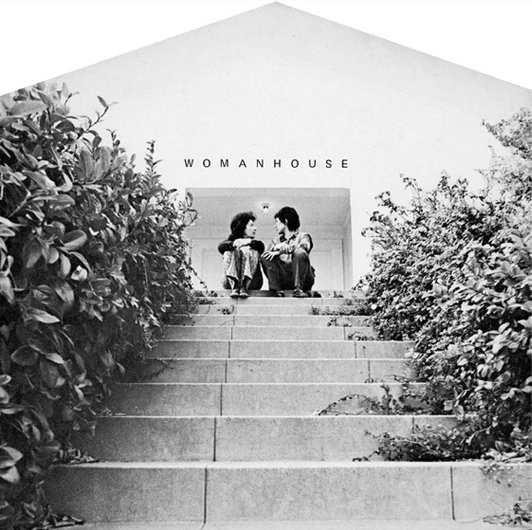
- Front page of the exhibition catalog for Womanhouse, photograph by Sheila Levrant de Bretteville
- Born: November 15, 1923; Toronto, Ontario, Canada
- Died: June 20, 2015 (aged 91); Hampton Bays, New York, United States
- Education: BA, University of Iowa (1945), MA, University of Iowa (1946), MFA, University of Iowa (1949)
- Known for: Painter, Printmaker, Collagist, Femmage artist
- Movement: Abstract Expressionism, Feminist art, Pattern and Decoration
- Spouse: Paul Brach
- Awards: College Art Association Distinguished Artist Award for Lifetime Achievement (2002)

Miriam "Mimi" Schapiro (November 15, 1923 – June 20, 2015) was a Canadian-born artist based in the United States. She was a painter, sculptor, printmaker, and a pioneer of feminist art. She was also considered a leader of the Pattern and Decoration art movement. Her artwork blurs the line between fine art and craft. She incorporated craft elements into her paintings due to their association with women and femininity. She often used icons that are associated with women, such as hearts, floral decorations, geometric patterns, and the color pink. In the 1970s, she made the hand fan, a typically small woman's object, heroic by painting it six feet by twelve feet. "The fan-shaped canvas, a powerful icon, gave her the opportunity to experiment … Out of this emerged a surface of textured coloristic complexity and opulence that formed the basis of her new personal style. The kimono, fans, houses, and hearts were the form into which she repeatedly poured her feelings and desires, her anxieties, and hopes".

== Early life and education ==
Schapiro was born in Toronto, Ontario, Canada, the only child of Russian Jewish parents. Her Russian immigrant grandfather invented the first movable doll's eye in the United States and manufactured "Teddy Bears". Schapiro later included dolls in her work, as paper cutouts and as photo reproductions of images from magazines, and in her statement accompanying an exhibition of her work at the Flomenhaft Gallery, she remarked that "In our country we don't feel about dolls as Europeans, Africans or Asians do," providing an anecdote that nuns at a Japanese temple explained their reason for being there was to care for the souls of the dolls. Her father, Theodore Schapiro, was an artist and an intellectual who was studying at the Beaux-Arts Institute of Design, in New York, when Schapiro was born. He was an industrial design artist who fostered her desire to be an artist and served as her role model and mentor. Her mother, Fannie Cohen, a homemaker, encouraged Schapiro to take up a career in the arts. At age six, Schapiro began drawing.

As a teenager, Schapiro was taught by Victor d’Amico, her first modernist teacher at the Museum of Modern Art. In the evenings she joined WPA classes for adults to study drawing from the nude model. In 1943, Schapiro entered Hunter College in New York City, but eventually transferred to the University of Iowa. At the University of Iowa, Schapiro studied painting with Stuart Edie and James Lechay. She studied printmaking under Mauricio Lasansky and was his personal assistant, which then led her to help form the Iowa Print Group. Lasansky taught his students to use several different printing techniques in their work and to study the masters' work in order to find solutions to technical problems.

At the State University of Iowa she met the artist Paul Brach, whom she married in 1946. After Brach and Schapiro graduated in 1949, Brach received a job in the University of Missouri as a painting instructor. Schapiro did not receive a position, and was very unhappy during their time there. By 1951 they moved to New York City and befriended many of the Abstract expressionist artists of the New York School, including Joan Mitchell, Larry Rivers, Knox Martin and Michael Goldberg. Schapiro and Brach lived in New York City during the 1950s and 1960s. Miriam and Paul had a son, Peter Brach, in 1955. Before and after the birth of her son Peter, Schapiro struggled with her identity and place as an artist. Miriam Schapiro's successive studios, after this period of crisis, became both environments for and reflections of the changes in her life and art.

She died on June 20, 2015, in Hampton Bays, New York, aged 91.

== Career ==
Miriam Schapiro's art career spanned over four decades. She was involved in Abstract expressionism, Minimalism, Computer art, and Feminist art. She worked with collage, printmaking, painting, femmage, (Note: The word "femmage," has been used: from the 1970s onwards by Miriam Schapiro and her fellow artist Melissa Meyer (as a portmanteau of 'feminine' and 'collage') to denote the activities of collage, assemblage, découpage and photomontage practised by women - "traditional women's techniques – sewing, piercing, hooking, cutting, appliquéing, cooking and the like …"; by the artist Louise Lidströmer, beginning circa 1994, with regard to a series of her paintings with this title, to mean a female celebration, tribute, or "homage paid by a woman"; or, more generally and particularly in French, to mean "homage paid to a woman.") and sculpture. Schapiro also paid homage to women artists of the past. In the early 1970s she made paintings and collages which included photo reproductions of past artists such as Mary Cassatt. In the mid-1980s she painted portraits of Frida Kahlo on top of her old self-portrait paintings. In the 1990s Schapiro began to include women of the Russian avant-garde in her work.

=== New York and abstract expressionism ===
After moving to New York in 1951, Brach frequented The Club, where abstract expressionist artists met, but she was never a member. In one of her journals, she wrote that women were not viewed as serious artists by members of The Club. Schapiro worked in the style of abstract expressionism during this time period. Between 1953 and 1957, Schapiro created a substantial body of work. She created her own gestural language, "painting thinly and wiping out", in which the wiped area played a significant role as the painted area. Although these works were abstracted, such as her work Beast Land and Plenty, Schapiro based them off of black and white illustrations of works by the Old Masters. In December 1957, André Emmerich selected one of her paintings for the opening of his gallery.

In 1960, she began to eliminate abstract expressionist brushwork from her paintings and in order to introduce a variety of geometric forms. Schapiro also started looking for maternal symbols. Her series, Shrines was created in 1961–63 with this in mind. It is one of her earliest groups of work that was also autobiographical, with each section of the work showing an aspect of being a woman artist. The play between the illusion of depth and the acceptance of the surface became the main formal strategy of her work for the rest of the decade. In 1964, Schapiro and her husband Paul both worked at the Tamarind Lithography Workshop. One of Schapiro's biggest turning points in her art career was working at the workshop and experimenting with Josef Albers' Color-Aid paper, where she began making several new shrines and created her first collages.

=== California years ===
==== Computer Art ====
In 1967, Schapiro and Brach moved to California so both could teach in the art department at the University of California, San Diego. There, Schapiro met David Nalibof, a physicist who worked for General Dynamics. Nalibof formulated computer programs that could plot and alter her drawings. This was how one of her most iconic works, Big Ox #1 from 1968 was created. The diagonals of which represented the limbs of the "Vitruvian man", while the O depicted the center of the women, the vagina, the womb. This work is described as "a newly invented, body-based, archetypal emblem for female power and identity, realized in brilliant red-orange, silver, and 'tender shades of pink'". The O is also thought to symbolize the egg, which exists as the window into the maternal structure with outstretched limbs.

==== The Feminist Art Program ====
In 1971, Schapiro, with artist Judy Chicago, began to develop the Feminist Art Program at the newly established California Institute of the Arts in Valencia. The program set out to address problems in the arts from an institutional position and focused on the expansion of a female environment in downtown L.A. In Womanhouse women were able to turn the creativity invested in providing their families with supportive environments toward themselves by allowing their fantasies to take over all rooms. They wanted the creation of art to be less of a private, introspective adventure and more of a shared public process through consciousness-raising sessions, personal confessions, and technical training. "('House') became the repository of female fantasy and womanly dreams". Schapiro participated in the Womanhouse exhibition in 1972. Schapiro's smaller piece within Womanhouse, called "Dollhouse", was constructed using various scrap pieces to create all the furniture and accessories in the house. Each room signified a particular role a woman plays in society and depicted the conflicts between them.

=== Feminist Art ===
Schapiro's work from the 1970s onward consists primarily of collages assembled from fabrics, which she called "femmages". In the early seventies, succeeding Schapiro's collaboration in Womanhouse, she made her first fabric collages in her studio in Los Angeles, which looked much like a room in a house. From the male technological world of computers Schapiro moved into a woman's decorated house. In this home-like studio, Schapiro monumentalized her fabric cabinet and its significance for women, in a number of large femmages, including A Cabinet for All Seasons. As Schapiro traveled the United States giving lectures, she would ask the women she met for a souvenir. These souvenirs would be used in her collage like paintings. She did collaborative art projects, like her series of etchings Anonymous was a Woman from 1977. She was able to produce the series with a group of nine women studio-art graduates from the University of Oregon. Each print is an impression made from an untransformed doily that was placed in soft ground on a zinc plate, then etched and printed.

Her 1977-78 essay Waste Not Want Not: An Inquiry into What Women Saved and Assembled – FEMMAGE (written with Melissa Meyer) describes femmage as the activities of collage, assemblage, découpage and photomontage practised by women using "traditional women's techniques – sewing, piercing, hooking, cutting, appliquéing, cooking and the like …"

After 1975, Schapiro returned to New York and with what she made after selling some paintings, she not only had a room but a studio of her own. Decoration and "collaboration," are central to her artwork and both play a significant role in her house as well as in her studio. The studio became Schapiro's own room and at moments of great personal conflict, the only connection with her creative self. Her various studios throughout the span of her career have reflected the changes in both the outer and the inner realities of her life. They have expressed her changing self-conceptions in accordance with or in against society, which keeps gender roles separate. Schapiro's studios have also become metaphors for her creative work, as well as spaces in which she could live her life and fulfill her dreams as well. Her image is included in the iconic 1972 poster Some Living American Women Artists by Mary Beth Edelson.

=== Collaborations and Identity ===
In the process of taking on different projects, Schapiro's studio expanded and eventually became portable, following her as she traveled from place to place. It was during the same time of her Oregon collaborative project with the nine women that Schapiro also created her first "Collaboration Series" with women artists of the past. This series combined reproductions of the work of Mary Cassatt and Berthe Morisot with colorful and sensuous fabric borders in patterns inspired by quilts. In Mary Cassatt and Me, Schapiro overlapped her own mental image of her mother with Cassatt's maternal ideal–her mother reading a newspaper.

In the 1990s Schapiro began exploring her Jewish identity further in her painting. Her painting My History (1997) she used the same structure as the House project and built rooms of different memories surrounding her Jewish heritage. Her most explicit Jewish-themed statement in art was Four Matriarchs, stained glass windows portraying the biblical heroines Sarah, Rebecca, Rachel, and Leah. This was a colorful piece combining identity symbology and her older domesticated art to create the true vision of what high art meant to the public. Mother Russia (1994), was a fan piece made by Schapiro that drew from her family's Russian background. She depicts the powerful women from Russia each on a row of the handheld fan with a hat and a veil. She added pieces from each artist work in her "collaborative" style to join them as revolutionary women and give hidden figures praise. Her background in both the Russian and Jewish culture have very much attributed to what Schapiro's collection of work represents. She was interviewed for the 2010 film !Women Art Revolution.

Schapiro's works are held in numerous museum collections including the Smithsonian American Art Museum, Jewish Museum (New York), the National Gallery of Art, the Museum of Modern Art, the Pérez Art Museum Miami, in Florida, and the Pennsylvania Academy of the Fine Arts. Her awards include the Distinguished Artist Award for Lifetime Achievement from the College Art Association and a 1987 Guggenheim Fellowship.

In 2023 her work was included in the exhibition Action, Gesture, Paint: Women Artists and Global Abstraction 1940-1970 at the Whitechapel Gallery in London.

== Awards and honors ==
- 1982: Skowhegan Medal for Collage
- 1983: Honorary Doctorate of Fine Arts, College of Wooster, Wooster, OH
- 1987: Guggenheim Fellowship for Fine Arts in US and Canada
- 1988: Honors Award, The Women's Caucus for Art
- 1989: Honorary Doctor of Fine Arts, California College of Arts and Crafts, Oakland, CA
- 1992: Honors Award, National Association of Schools of Art and Design
- 1994: Honors Award, New York State NARAL
- 1994: Honorary Doctorate Degree, Minneapolis and Design, Minneapolis, MN
- 1994: Honorary Doctorate Degree, Lawrence University, Appleton, WI
- 2002: Lifetime Achievement Award, Women's Caucus for Art

== List of major works ==
- (1963) Shrines Grey Art Gallery
- (1968) Big Ox No. 1 Brooklyn Museum
- (1972) Womanhouse
- (1972) Dollhouse, with Sherry Brody, Smithsonian American Art Museum
- (1972) Lady Genji's Maze
- (1978) Connection
- (1983) Feathered Fan, Pérez Art Museum Miami
- (1983) Wonderland Smithsonian American Art Museum
- (1990) Conservatory (Frida and Me)

== See also ==
- Feminist art movement in the United States
- Feminist Art Program
- Heresies: A Feminist Publication on Art and Politics
- Heresies Collective
- New York Feminist Art Institute

== Books ==
- Gouma-Peterson, Thalia, and Miriam Schapiro. Miriam Schapiro: Shaping the Fragments of Art and Life. New York: Harry N. Abrams Publishers, 1999. Print.
- Herskovic, Marika New York School Abstract Expressionists Artists Choice by Artists, (New York School Press, 2000.) ISBN 0-9677994-0-6
- Schapiro, Miriam, and Thalia Gouma-Peterson. Miriam Schapiro, a retrospective, 1953 - 1980: Wooster, OH: n.p., 1980. Print.
- Schapiro, Miriam, Robert A. Yassin, and Paul Brach. Miriam Schapiro: works on paper: a thirty-year retrospective. Tucson, AZ: Tucson Museum of Art, 1999. Print.
