= Nancy Youdelman =

American sculptor (born 1948)

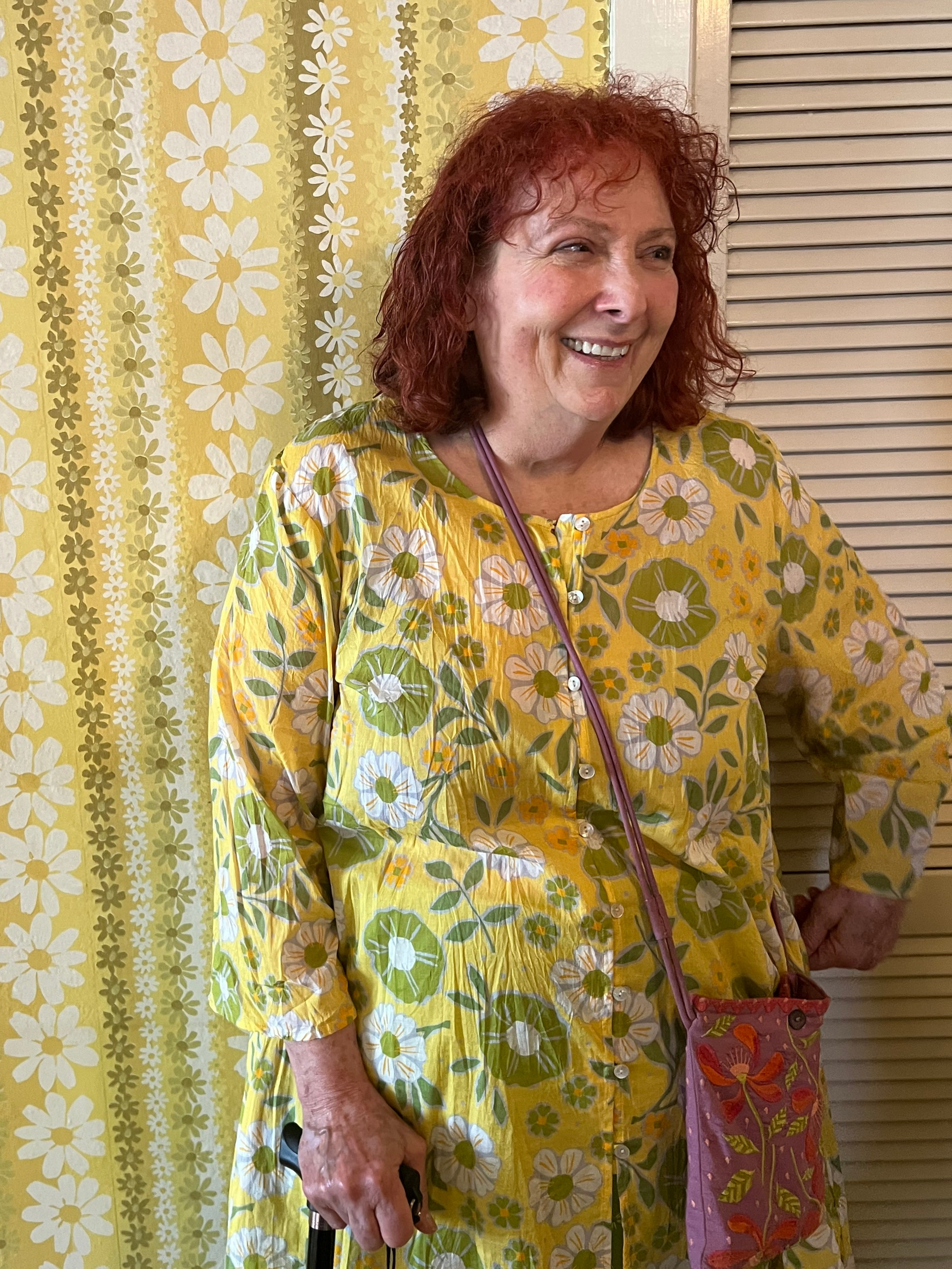
- Born: June 10, 1948 (age 78); New York, N.Y.
- Education: Fresno State College, California Institute of the Arts, University of California, Los Angeles
- Known for: Sculpture: Mixed Media/Encaustic
- Movement: Feminist Art Movement
- Website: Official website

Nancy Youdelman (born 1948 in New York City) is a mixed media sculptor who lives and works in Clovis, California. She also taught art at California State University, Fresno from 1999 until her retirement in 2013. "Since the early 1970s Youdelman has been transforming clothing into sculpture, combining women's and girl's dresses, hats, gloves, shoes, and undergarments with a variety of organic materials (flowers, roots, leaves, and vines) and common household objects (buttons, pins, photographs, and letters).

Marina La Palma writes in The magazine, "Youdelman studied costume design at Fresno State University and was drawn into the Feminist Art program founded by Judy Chicago in 1970. She went on to the Cal Arts program that followed a short time after this. Youdelman participated in the 1972 Womanhouse, in which artists created elaborate installations in the various rooms of an old Hollywood mansion. Womanhouse evolved to become "the influential and long-lived Los Angeles Woman's Building project, and inspired similar undertakings in other cities."

== Education ==
- M. F. A., University of California, Los Angeles, 1976
- B. F. A., California Institute of the Arts, 1973
- California State University, Fresno, major study: English Literature, Costume and Make-up for the Theater and Art, 1966-1971

== Selected solo exhibitions ==
- Nancy Youdelman: Fashioning a Feminist Vision 1972-2017, Fresno Art Museum, catalogue, California, 2017
- Nancy Youdelman: Embellished, Tai Modern, Santa Fe, New Mexico, 2014-2015
- From There to Here: Nancy Youdelman, Four Decades as a Feminist Artist, Palmer Museum of Art, Penn State School of Visual Arts, 2014
- Dogs are Forever, Eight Modern, Santa Fe, New Mexico, 2013
- The Dearest Allen Series, Letters to Allen and Who Was Betty Potter?, Gallery 25, Fresno California, 2012
- Outside the Realm, Eight Modern, Santa Fe, New Mexico, 2011
- Threads of Memory, Eight Modern, Santa Fe, New Mexico, 2008
- Recent Work, Gallery 25, Fresno, California, 2006
- Clothing, Metaphor & Memory, Mohr Art Gallery, Community School of Music & Art, Mountain View, California, 2006
- Leaves 2003, installation, Conley Art Gallery, CSU Fresno, California, 2003
- Disembodied Garments, curated by Jaquelin Pilar, Fresno Art Museum, California, 2000
- Clothing Transformations, Fresno Pacific University, California, 1998
- Nancy Youdelman, Assemblage, Fresno Air Terminal, California, 1995
- Nancy Youdelman, Ovsey Gallery, Los Angeles, 1990
- Nancy Youdelman, Molly Barnes Gallery, Los Angeles, 1983
- Tableaux-Remnants, Grandview Gallery, Los Angeles, California, 1974

== Selected group exhibitions ==
- A Show of Hands: Imprints of Humanity, ACA Galleries, New York, New York, 2018
- The Art of the Cooks of Peace Press, Arena 1 Gallery, Santa Monica, California, 2017
- F*ck U in the Most Loving Way, Northern California Women's Caucus for Art, Arc Gallery, San Francisco, California, 2016-2017
- Why Not Judy Chicago?, curated by Xabier Arakistain, CAPC Musée d'Art Contemporain, Bordeaux, France, 2016
- Why Not Judy Chicago?, curated by Xabier Arakistain, Bilbao, Spain, 2015
- XX Redux, Guggenheim Gallery, Chapman University, Orange, California, March, 2015
- A 'Womanhouse' or a Roaming House? 'A Room of One's Own' Today, A.I.R. Gallery, curated by Mira Schor, Brooklyn, New York, 2014
- Bound, Phoenix Gallery, Women's Caucas for Art National Exhibition (catalogue), New York, New York, 2013
- Nancy Youdelman, Mark Paron, Walter Robinson and Cara Alhadeff, Chanel Boutique, Maiden Lane, San Francisco, Sponsored by SFMOMA, Chanel and Vanity Fair, 2005
- Four Generations of Armenian Artists, Fresno Art Museum, Fresno, California, 2002
- Nancy Youdelman/Nancie Holliday, Fig Tree Gallery, Fresno, California, 1999
- Feminist Directions 1970/1996, curated by Amelia Jones and Laura Meyer, Sweeney Art Gallery, University of California, Riverside, 1996
- USA Within Limits, Oficina Das Artes Do Livro, São Paulo, Brazil, 1994
- 40 Years of California Assemblage, Traveling exhibition, Wight Art Gallery, University of California, Los Angeles,1989
- At Home, Long Beach Museum of Art, California, 1983
- Robert Goulart, Janice Lester and Nancy Youdelman, Cerritos College Art Gallery, Norwalk, California, 1975
- Womanhouse, Los Angeles, project of the Feminist Art Program at California Institute of the Arts, Valencia, 1972
- First Exhibition, Feminist Art Studio, Rap Weekend, Fresno, California, 1971

== Grants ==
- Adolph and Esther Gottlieb Foundation, Visual Arts Grant Recipient, 2007
- Pollock/Krasner Foundation Grant Recipient, 2005
- C.E.T.A. Artist Grant, member of L.A.C.E., Los Angeles CA, 1978

== Feminist Art Program ==
Nancy Youdelman was one of the first students to participate in the Feminist Art Program, which Judy Chicago started in 1970 at Fresno State College. She participated in the Feminist Art Program from 1971—1973, including during the 1972 Womanhouse exhibit. Nancy recalls why she signed up for Chicago's class advertised as a sculpture class for women only:

"There was a place to sign your name; I was intrigued and signed up right away. As an art major I had taken drawing, painting, and photography classes but had avoided sculpture ...Students were required to create a series of three-dimensional cubes, one of plaster, one of wood, then one of metal...I was not interested in making cubes; I did not see the point. Instead I had taken theater classes, mostly costume and makeup, which ended up preparing me for my early artwork--the costume and makeup pieces that I did in that first feminist art class in Fresno".

She also was the artist facilitator for Wo/Manhouse 2022, a reimagining of the original Womanhouse.
