= Womanhouse =

Feminist art installation

Coordinates: 34.177262°N 118.323140°W

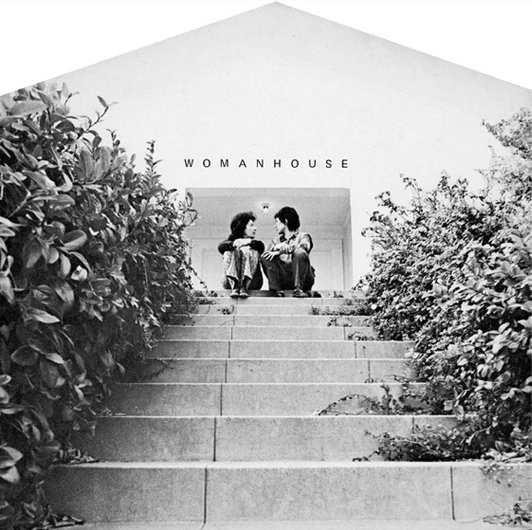

Womanhouse (January 30 – February 28, 1972) was a feminist art installation and performance space organized by Judy Chicago and Miriam Schapiro, co-founders of the California Institute of the Arts (CalArts) Feminist Art Program, and was the first public exhibition of art centered upon female empowerment. Chicago, Schapiro, their students, and women artists from the local community, including Faith Wilding, participated. Chicago and Schapiro encouraged their students to use consciousness-raising techniques to generate the content of the exhibition. Together, the students and professors worked to build an environment where women's conventional social roles could be shown, exaggerated, and subverted.

Only women were allowed to view the exhibition on its first day, after which the exhibition was open to all viewers. During the exhibition's duration, it received approximately 10,000 visitors.

== Origins ==
The Feminist Art Program began at the California Institute of the Arts in 1971 after an experimental year at Fresno State College under the name 'Women's Art Program'. The students in the program were admitted as a group when Chicago and Schapiro were hired at Cal Arts after Chicago found that the Fresno State College Art department was reluctant to embrace her vision of a new kind of female-centered art. It was their intention to teach without the use of authoritarian rules or a unilateral flow of power from teacher to student.

In 1971, the Feminist Art Program was slated to occupy a new building but found itself without adequate space at the start of the school year. The lack of appropriate studio space paved the way for a collaborative group project set to highlight the ideological and symbolic conflation of women and houses. The result of this project was the Womanhouse installation, built by the students in an abandoned Victorian house in Hollywood.

The program utilized a method of teaching that relied on group cooperation. Students would sit in a circle and share their thoughts on a selected topic of discussion. The circular teaching method was intended to provide a "nourishing environment for growth" and to promote a "circular, more womb-like" atmosphere. The goal of these discussions was for each woman to reach a higher level of self-perception, to validate their experiences, as well as the "search for subject matter" to incorporate into artwork and to address their individual aesthetic needs. However, many students fostered resentments towards Chicago and Schapiro, claiming they were suffering from their own power trips. Chicago insisted her students feelings were the result of their own internalized sexism and unconscious manifestations of their difficulties dealing with female authority figures.

The project's goals, as professed by Schapiro and Chicago, were to help students overcome some of the problems associated with being a woman. Many of the issues Chicago believed that the students needed to overcome were centered upon their lack of ability to perform traditionally masculine skills. Chicago pushed students to become familiar using equipment such as various tools, to become comfortable in their ability to be assertive, and to view themselves as a part of the work force not defined by their domestic roles. It was thought that by teaching women to use power tools and proper building techniques, they would gain confidence and subsequently challenge the gendered expectations. Schapiro and Chicago believed that women could achieve more if society did not limit them and expect less from women than men.

These techniques were to result in an "exclusively female environment" that included a greater community of female artists. The goal of this community was to expose the students to credited female artists not limited to Schapiro and Chicago.

Paula Harper, an art historian for the California Institute of Arts Feminist Art Program, is credited for suggesting the idea for Womanhouse. Schapiro supervised Womanhouse's dramatic works, while Chicago focused on other media. Their intention was to transform a domestic environment into one that fully expressed the experiences of women.

Womanhouse began in an old deserted mansion on a residential street in Hollywood and became an environment in which: “The age-old female activity of homemaking was taken to fantasy proportions. Womanhouse became the repository of the daydreams women have as they wash, bake, cook, sew, clean and iron their lives away." Before creating the art environments and pieces, the students had to do extensive reconstruction on the house, which had been empty for many years. They had to fix broken windows and furniture.

== Construction and process ==
The group broke into teams in order to find a suitable location for their "dreams and fantasies". They found a 17-room, 75-year-old dilapidated mansion at 533 N. Mariposa Ave. in a rundown section of Hollywood. Members of the group knocked on doors to find the owner of the house, who one neighbor remarked would "certainly not be interested in the project."

After a visit to the Hall of Records, they found the owner to be Amanda Psalter. The group described their intentions for the house in a letter to the Psalter family. In response, the house was granted through a special lease agreement for the three-month duration of the project, after which it would be demolished. Construction spanned from November 1971 to January 1972.

The renovation included cleaning, painting, sanding floors, replacing windows, installing lights, and sanding, scraping, and wallpapering walls. New walls were built for practical and aesthetic reasons and women learned wallpapering techniques to refurbish one of the rooms. Eventually a crew was needed to paint the exterior of the house, install locks and advise the women on basic electrical wiring.

The women struggled as they began renovating the mansion during the winter, as the building did not have hot water, heat, or plumbing. Renovations included replacing 25 windows and replacing banisters that had been pulled out by vandals. They worked eight-hour days. To many of the women, these tasks were new and unfamiliar which resulted in a discontentment for many of the students. The women felt as though they were not presented with a program in which they could succeed. To cope with the frustration of learning new techniques while meeting stringent deadlines, the group held meetings to deal with any problems that arose and sessions to raise group consciousness. Some former students now see this tension as a result of Chicago's authoritarian presence, feeling that she imposed her own goals on the group.

Here are some perspectives from participators when they recall the struggles of Womanhouse after 25 years later.

Camille Grey : “Put 30 women together and see what happens. A nightmare.”

Robin Mitchell: "It was simultaneously one of the best and worst experiences of my life.”

Mira Schor: "I left the Program after one year, because of my disagreements, and because I wanted to experience the school outside the confines of the Program. I have avoided group feminism since then. ... However it was a unique privilege to attend feminist boot camp, it was a privilege to participate in the Feminist Program. I consider it a major formative experience in my development as an artist, teacher, and writer/editor.”

Nancy Youdelman: "Looking back 25 years later, I have mixed feeling about the Feminist Art Program – We had something really incredible and unique and somehow we could not get beyond personalities and create a lasting support system."

== Participating artists ==
Chicago and Schapiro invited other local artists Sherry Brody, Carol Edison Mitchell and Wanda Westcoast to participate and to hang their work alongside that of the other women.

Among the artists and CalArts students that collaborated were:

- Beth Bachenheimer (Shoe Closet, Dining Room)
- Sherry Brody (Lingerie Pillows, The Dollhouse, Dining Room)
- Judy Chicago (Menstruation Bathroom, Cock and Cunt Play)
- Susan Frazier (Nurturant Kitchen/Aprons in Kitchen)
- Camille Grey (Lipstick Bathroom)
- Paula Harper (suggested project, Art Historian)
- Vicky Hodgetts (Nurturant Kitchen/Eggs to Breasts)
- Kathy Huberland (Bridal Staircase)
- Judy Huddleston (Personal Environment)
- Janice Johnson
- Karen LeCocq (Leah's Room, Dining Room)
- Janice Lester (Personal Space, Cock and Cunt Play)
- Paula Longendyke (Garden Jungle)
- Ann Mills (Leaf Room)
- Carol Edison Mitchell (Quilts)
- Robin Mitchell (Painted Room, Dining Room)
- Sandra (Sandy) Orgel ("Ironing", Linen Closet)
- Jan Oxenberg (Three Women)
- Christine (Chris) Rush ("Scrubbing", Necco Wafers)
- Marsha Salisbury
- Miriam Schapiro (The Dollhouse, Dining Room)
- Robin Schiff (Nightmare Bathroom)
- Mira Schor (Red Moon Room)
- Robin Weltsch (Nurturant Kitchen/Eggs to Breasts)
- Wanda Westcoast (Curtains in Nurturant Kitchen)
- Faith Wilding (Womb Room & Waiting, Cock and Cunt Play, Dining Room, Crocheted Environment)
- Shawnee Wollenmann (The Nursery, Three Women)
- Nancy Youdelman (Leah's Room, Three Women)

In the journal Signs, Paula Harper says, "the young students did not have much personal experience of traditional marriage and homemaking roles of women. Nonetheless, the ideas of all were influenced by the general aim of feminists in the late 1960s to revise women's position in society by bringing attention to their oppression, and this ideology clearly shared by the many individuals involved gave Womanhouse its impact.

Working collaboratively on Womanhouse, the students gained new skills while developing a deeper understanding of human and personal experiences. The students also provided tours of the exhibition, which gave them the opportunity to articulate their artwork while maintaining their personal vision when faced with criticism. Even though the exhibition provided the students with great satisfaction and team effort some of the artists didn’t feel any personal accomplishment, and were looking forward to going back to work on their individual projects.

The mansion contained a variety feminist installations, sculptures, performances and other forms of art. The artists creating Womanhouse did so, centralizing a white, cisgender, heterosexual and middle-class experience of womanhood in the early 70s. By transforming a "woman's space" (such as a kitchen) into a radical feminist art, the artists truly made a statement. Here they spoke out about women's issues, as well as criticizing the patriarchy. This helped women artists and architects in the pursuit of recognition and acknowledgement on the same level as men. Using a mansion as their chosen setting furthered their statement.

== Rooms and installations ==
Womanhouse displayed the conventions of womanhood through artistic spaces and experiences. Rooms included a pink kitchen, a bride thrown against a wall, a closet with sheets, and a bathroom for menstruation.

Nurturant Kitchen – by Susan Frazier, Vicki Hodgetts, Robin Weltsch. Present in the kitchen are plates of food under a line of light bulbs, resembling them to a factory worker's assembly line. This highlights the dehumanizing aspects of a woman's role as nurturer.

Aprons in Kitchen – by Susan Frazier A display in Nurturant Kitchen. Aprons are fashioned with breasts and other female body parts. This allows the female to remove her bodily features when she is done with housework, implying that her physical body is inextricably linked to her societal role.

Eggs to Breasts – Forms cover the ceilings and walls, starting as eggs on the ceiling and gradually transforming into breasts as the pattern continues down. Underscores the woman's traditional role as a nurturer by combining images of the kitchen and of a woman's sagging breasts.

Dining Room – by Beth Bachenheimer, Sherry Brody, Karen LeCocq, Robin Mitchell, Miriam Schapiro, Faith Wilding. The Dining Room features a crown molding of lifelike painted fruit. A mural, based on a 19th-century still life by Anna Peale, is displayed on a wall behind the dining room table. The table itself features a bread dough sculpture, turkey, ham, pecan pie, vinyl salad bowl, vinyl wine glasses and a wine bottle. A chandelier hangs above the table. Below the table, a stenciled-rug is painted directly onto the floor. Dining Room is the most collaborative project in Womanhouse, utilizing the efforts of seven women to complete. It is meant to express a generous, bountiful and romantic aura.

Bridal Staircase – by Kathy Huberland. Features a life-size doll replica of a bride, complete with veil and wedding dress, descending the stairs. She is fixed against the wall on the landing. Gauzy fabric adorns the walls and garlands of green and flowers encircle the bannister.

Personal Environment – by Judy Huddleston. Intended by the artist to be "an entirely different world" that transcends the "established plane".

Crocheted Environment – by Faith Wilding. Resembling a "primitive womb shelter", the room is painted black. Crocheted thread covers the wall, and a single light bulb illuminates from the ceiling.

Leaf Room – by Ann Mills. A room with painted leaves. The leaves represent cycles; of seasons, life and feelings. They also functioned as symbolic “shields” for the artist, allowing her to both expose herself and hide at the same time.

Leah's Room – by Karen LeCocq, Nancy Youdelman. Léa, a character based on the aging courtesan from Colette's novel Chéri, sits in a watermelon pink bedroom. The performance (performed by LeCocq) occurred continuously on a daily basis, and involved Léa applying makeup meticulously, then removing it, in an endless cycle to illustrate the pain of aging and the desperate process of trying to restore one's beauty. The performance illustrates the high standards of beauty levied by the pressure of society for women to maintain at all cost. Léa makes continual efforts to keep the attention of a man as her beauty deteriorates with age.

Personal Space – by Janice Lester. A bedroom that serves as the artist's personal fantasy, a room that only she can enter. The secret room acts as both a sanctuary and a trap.

Painted Room – by Robin Mitchell. An otherwise white bedroom with painterly splashes of color on the walls and floor.

Red Moon Room – by Mira Schor. A painting features a self-portrait of the artist and a rising red moon over rolling hills.

Shoe Closet – by Beth Bachenheimer. Hundreds of pairs of shoes were collected, painted and treated for this installation. A 'spike heel' features real spikes driven from the bottom of the shoe. A closet with a comically extravagant number of shoes conveys the desperate attempt of women to be fashionable.

Linen Closet – by Sandy Orgel. A female mannequin is installed in the closet, with shelves and drawers bisecting her body parts. Folded towels sit on the shelves.

Lipstick Bathroom – by Camille Grey. A bathroom where every fixture is painted bright, 'Lipstick' red. The room features 200 plastic lipsticks, a fur-lined bathtub, and a female figure painted entirely red. Stage lights were used to light the bathroom.

Menstruation Bathroom – by Judy Chicago. The bathroom is painted a stark white, and a layer of gauze covers the shelves. A single trashcan is overflowing with what appear to be used tampons, a woman's "hidden secret" that cannot be covered up.

Nightmare Bathroom – by Robbin Schiff. A bathtub hosts a woman's figure with most of her body obscured in water, made entirely from loose sand.

The Dollhouse Room – by Sherry Brody, Miriam Schapiro. According to Schapiro, The Dollhouse Room juxtaposes themes of "supposed safety and comfort in the home" with "terrors existing within its walls".

- The Dollhouse – The Dollhouse serves as the centerpiece of The Dollhouse Room. It is a six-room miniature house. The artist's studio room contains a miniature nude man atop a pedestal, with an erect penis and bananas at his feet. Downstairs, a miniature woman sits at her dressing table. There are many monsters present in the dollhouse, despite its familiar domestic aspects. To the left of the artist's studio is a nursery with a baby replaced by a monster. Outside the window, peering in, is a grizzly bear. Downstairs, a group of ten men stare in through the kitchen window. A rattlesnake is curled on the parlor floor. The Dollhouse was acquired by the Smithsonian Institution in 1995 and is the only publicly available piece of Womanhouse.
- Lingerie Pillows – created by Sherry Brody. The pillows were sewn from underwear and bras and displayed on a small tabletop. Miriam Schapiro related a story that the curator of LACMA came to have a tour of Womanhouse. In the Dollhouse Room, he picked up one of the pillows and when he realized that he was holding, he was embarrassed. Schapiro recalled that everyone in the room had laughed, but upon reflection she wished that she had questioned his aversion to something delicate, intimate, and feminine.

The Nursery – by Shawnee Wollenman. Oversized furniture and toys simulate the feeling of being young, a small person in a big room. Special attention was made to make the space an androgynous, ideal living space for a child.

Garden Jungle – by Paula Longendyke. What resembles the skeletal forms of dead animals is present in the garden area. This is meant to convey the weakness and vulnerability of such animals.

Necco Wafers – by Christine Rush. Pastel colors contrast the otherwise organic colors of the garden. The ground is painted, and "fanciful clouds" create a "fantasy sky".

== Performances ==
Workshops led by Judy Chicago were held in the Living Room of the house. Ideas for pieces were derived from "informal working sessions", in which the women acted out aspects of their lives.

- Three Women – Three 'types' of women are represented; the hustler, the hippie, and the mother. They wear exaggerated makeup are initially meant to be comical. They tell the stories, all 'trapped' in some aspect of being a woman.
- Maintenance Pieces: Scrubbing, performed by Christine Rush, and Ironing, performed by Sandra Orgel – Two performance pieces pertaining to maintenance. A woman scrubs the floor on all fours with a brush in a continuous, repetitive motion. Another woman irons identical sheets over and over. This isolated monotonous tasks for an audience to highlight their performative nature, and how these performances play a role in the construction of gender roles.
- Cock and Cunt play – Written by Judy Chicago, performed by Janice Lester and Faith Wilding. Two characters wearing costumes featuring comically large genitalia converse as "She" and "He", each acting out the roles of their designated sex. "He" argues that her lack of a penis justifies having to do the dishes. This is meant to show how exaggerated essentialist notions about the female body contribute to her role in the domestic sphere and to reveal the consequences of stereotyping.
- Waiting – Written by Faith Wilding. The actress sits in a rocking chair and slowly recounts how her days were structured around 'waiting' for things to happen; her husband to give her pleasure, her kids to leave home, and waiting for some time for herself.
- The Birth Trilogy – In the first section, a group of women stands in a line as they symbolically 'give birth' to one another. The 'babies' in this scenario lay on the ground until their 'mothers' come to hold and nurture them. In the end, all of the women gather in a circle as they chant and sing with heads bowed. The chant grows louder with time, ending in a "peak of ecstatic sound".

=== Reception ===
Womanhouse was the first feminist art project to receive attention on a national scale following its review by Time (magazine). Womanhouse exhibition served as an introduction of feminism to the general public a revolutionary act for the early 1970s, and it sparked many debates. One year after Womanhouse closed, in an article published by Ms. Magazine: "Many women artists have organized, are shedding their shackles, proudly untying the apron strings--and, in some cases, keeping the apron on, flaunting it, turning it into art."

A 1972 review in the Los Angeles Times by William Wilson described Womanhouse as a "lair of female creativity" that "reminds us that the female is our only direct link with the forces of nature". Though he remarks that "man's greatest creative acts may be but envious shadowings of her fecundity", this review may have also highlighted stereotypical patriarchal attitudes surrounding connections between women's bodies, the domestic, and nature that Womanhouse attempted to critique. Paula Harper argued that such language is an attempt by critics to soften the impact of Womanhouse by assimilating it according to conventions of femininity.

Some individuals strongly opposed this exhibition. Some critics claimed that radical feminist art projects such as Womanhouse "undermined aesthetic standards" in the 1970s. Others claimed that it was more therapy than art. Paula Harper challenged this critique, arguing that challenging the definition of art is a "function of the avant-garde”.

Lack of scholarly attention paid to Womanhouse is attributed to its very early production in the context of feminist art, its lack of controversiality in relation to other installations of the time (most notably Chicago's own The Dinner Party), and some accusations of essentialism. However, it is also argued that the piece illustrates, complicates and subverts a "false binary" of essential and constructed identity which enhances its value and relevancy.

=== Influence ===
Artists, artworks, and institutions have been inspired by Womanhouse. The Womanhouse exhibition cannot be rebuilt, but a few of the rooms have been recreated for special exhibitions. In 1995, for example, the Bronx Museum of the Arts exhibited The Dollhouse by Sherry Brody and Miriam Schapiro, along with Faith Wilding's Womb Room, a recreation of Judy Chicago's Menstruation Bathroom, and Beth Bachenheimer's Shoe Closet, among others.”

The feminist spirit of Womanhouse lives on through the website Womenhouse, which was inspired by the groundbreaking 1972 exhibition. Faith Wilding is among the participants in this collaborative site featuring virtual rooms and domestic spaces. Womenhouse catapults the issues raised by the original exhibition into the 21st century, within "a cyber-politics that addresses the multivalent vicissitudes of identity formation and domesticity.”

Womanhouse was cited in 2019 by The New York Times as one of the 25 works of art that defined the contemporary age.

== Films ==
Womanhouse was produced by Johanna Demetrakas. Miriam Schapiro arranged for a 47-minute documentary film to be made about the project and released in the summer of 1972. The project was produced by Johanna Demetrakas under the auspices of the American Film Society and is a part of Women Make Movies and was released in 1974. Demetrakas was said to be "impressed" and "inspired" by the project. Its European distribution is assured by le peuple qui manque.

Womanhouse is Not a Home was a film produced by Lynne Littman and directed by Parke Perine. It aired during February 1972 on the local KCET PBS channel. The film showed the installations, had the women artists speak about their work, and featured a consciousness raising session with Gloria Steinem.

Woman's House was an experimental film by Mako Idemitsu. It is a 13-minute film that provides close up details of various installations.

== 50th Anniversary in 2022 ==
In 2022 on the 50th anniversary of Womanhouse Chicago led the installation of Wo/Manhouse 2022 in a house in Belen, New Mexico. The installation was in place for a 5-month period from June though October 2022. The event was led by Chicago's non-profit organisation Through The Flower (TTF), which is located in Belen. Megan Malcom-Morgan, was executive director of TTF at that time. The anniversary installation included works by New Mexico artists.

== Bibliography ==
- Balducci, Temma. 2006. "Revisiting ‘Womanhouse’: Welcome to the (deconstructed) “Dollhouse”." Woman's Art Journal 27, no. 2: 17–23.
- Chicago, Judy. 1972. "Menstruation Bathroom." Art Journal 31, no. 3: 269.
- Chicago, Judy and Miriam Schapiro. 1971. "Feminist Art Program." Art Journal 31, no. 1: 48.
- Harper, Paula, "The First Feminist Art Program: A View from the 1980s", Signs, vol. 10, no. 4, summer, 1985, pp. 762–781.
- Lippard, Lucy. 1993. "In the Flesh: Looking Back and Talking Back." Women's Art Magazine no. 54: 4–9.
- Raven, Arlene, "Womanhouse," The Power of Feminist Art, London: Thames and Hudson, 1994, pp. 161–172.
- Schapiro, Miriam, "The Education of Women as Artists: Project Womanhouse", Art Journal, vol. 31, no.3, Spring, 1972, pp. 268–270.
- Sider, Sandra. “Womanhouse: Cradle of Feminist Art”. Art Spaces Archive Project. 2010 August 5. http://www.as-ap.org/content/womanhouse-cradle-feminist-art-sandra-sider-0.
- Wilding, Faith. “Womanhouse”. Womanhouse. 2014 October 4. http://womanhouse.refugia.net/.
- Ulrike Muller, Re:Tracing the Feminist Art Program, 1997. http://www.encore.at/retracing/index2.html
- Lucy Lippard, "Household Images in Art," Ms. 1 (no. 9, March 1973), p. 22.
- Indonesia, Sandra "WomanHouse. https://www.losososbaywoodpark.org/
