= Joyce Aiken =

American historian

Joyce Braun Aiken
- Born: Joyce Braun; 1931 (age 94–95); United States
- Education: California State University, Fresno
- Occupations: Feminist art historian, artist, and educator

Joyce Aiken (born 1931) is an American feminist art historian, artist, and educator. Aiken taught the subject for over 20 years at California State University, Fresno, in Fresno, California and assisted her students in opening a feminist art gallery called Gallery 25. The gallery was one of the first feminist-focused art galleries in the country and helped launch Fresno to the forefront of the feminist art movement in the United States.

== Life and work ==
Joyce Aiken earned both her bachelors and master's of art from California State University, Fresno. Aiken started teaching feminist art in 1973 at California State University, Fresno, taking over from fellow artist Judy Chicago, who had started the class in 1970. She taught the class until her retirement in 1992. In 1974, her students founded an alternative art gallery for women in Fresno, California called Gallery 25. The gallery, along with Aiken's class, helped put Fresno on the map as a center for the feminist art movement, and continues to be one of the longest running co-op galleries in the United States. Aiken was elected as president to the Coalition of Women's Art in 1978, and moved to Washington, D.C. for a year during her tenure. The organization actively lobbied for the rights of women artists. Her work with the Coalition led to her being picked as one of the "80 Women to Watch in the 80's" by Ms. magazine.

In 1986, she curated a year-long exhibition at the Fresno Art Museum that honored women artists of California active between 1945 and 1965. The exhibit was the first of its kind in the United States. She was co-chair, in 2004, of the Council of 100, an organization within the Fresno Art Museum that continues to honor a woman artist every year with an exhibition, a special luncheon, and a catalog. That year, she also became the director of the Fresno Arts Council, before retiring in 2010.

== Collections and exhibitions ==
- Mosaic benches, with Jean Ray Laury; Fulton Mall, Fresno, California.

== Exhibitions ==
A few of exhibitions are:

- 2010 - Group exhibition: "39NOW"; Pacific Design Center, Los Angeles, California.
- 2012 - Two Person exhibition: "Seeing Through It and Seeing It Through"; Oakopolis Gallery, Oakland, California.

== Published works ==
The following are books that Joyce Aiken co-wrote with Jean Ray Laury:

- Creating Body Coverings. New York: Van Nostrand Reinhold (1974). ISBN 0-442-24698-6
- Handmade Rugs for Practically Anything. Clearwater: Countryside Press (1971). ISBN 0-385-07681-9
- The Total Tote Bag Book. New York: Taplinger Publishing Company (1977). ISBN 0-8008-7793-4
