= Decoupage =

French art of decorating an object

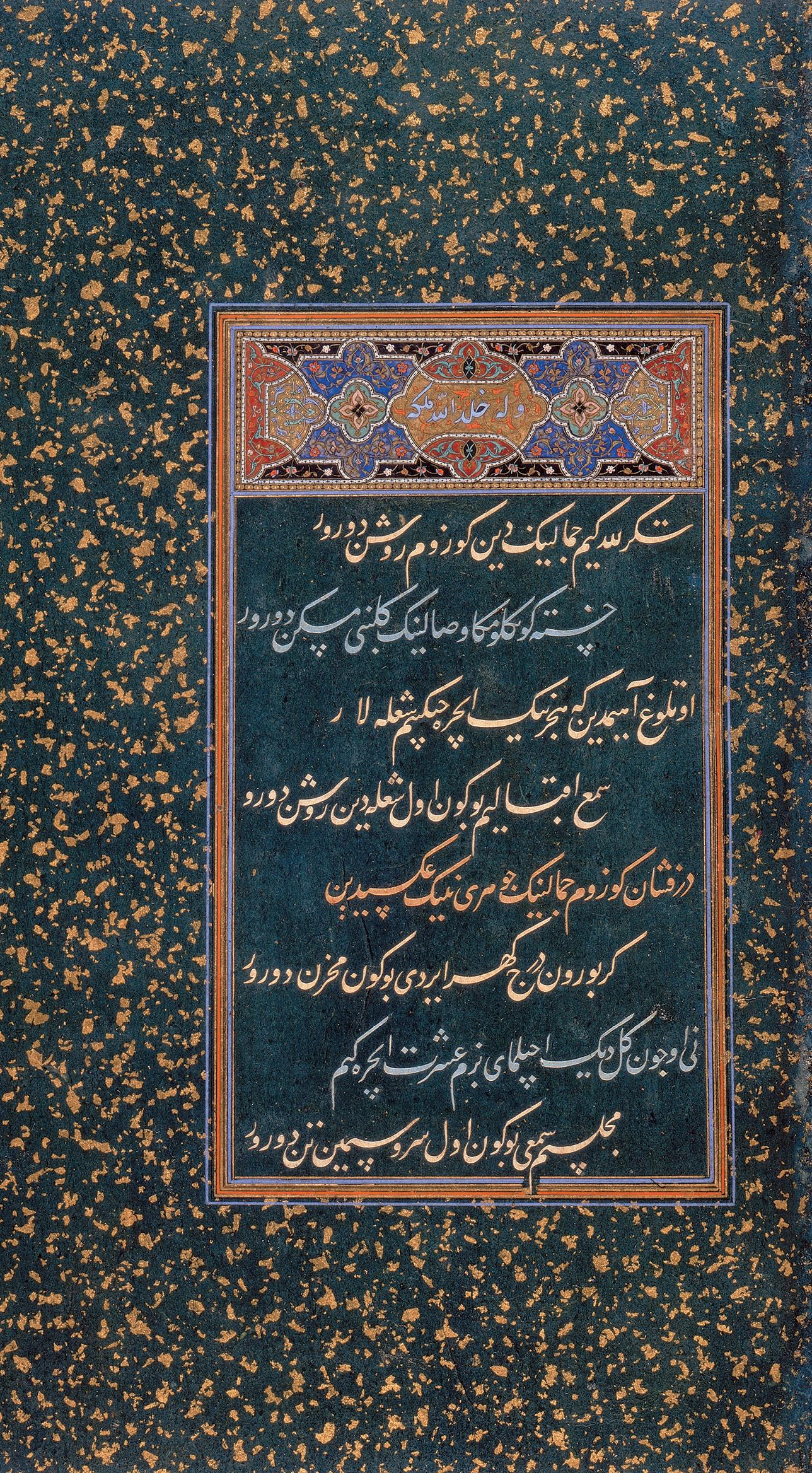
Page from the Diwan of Sultan Husayn Mirza with calligraphy made by découpage. Herat, c. 1490. Los Angeles County Museum of Art

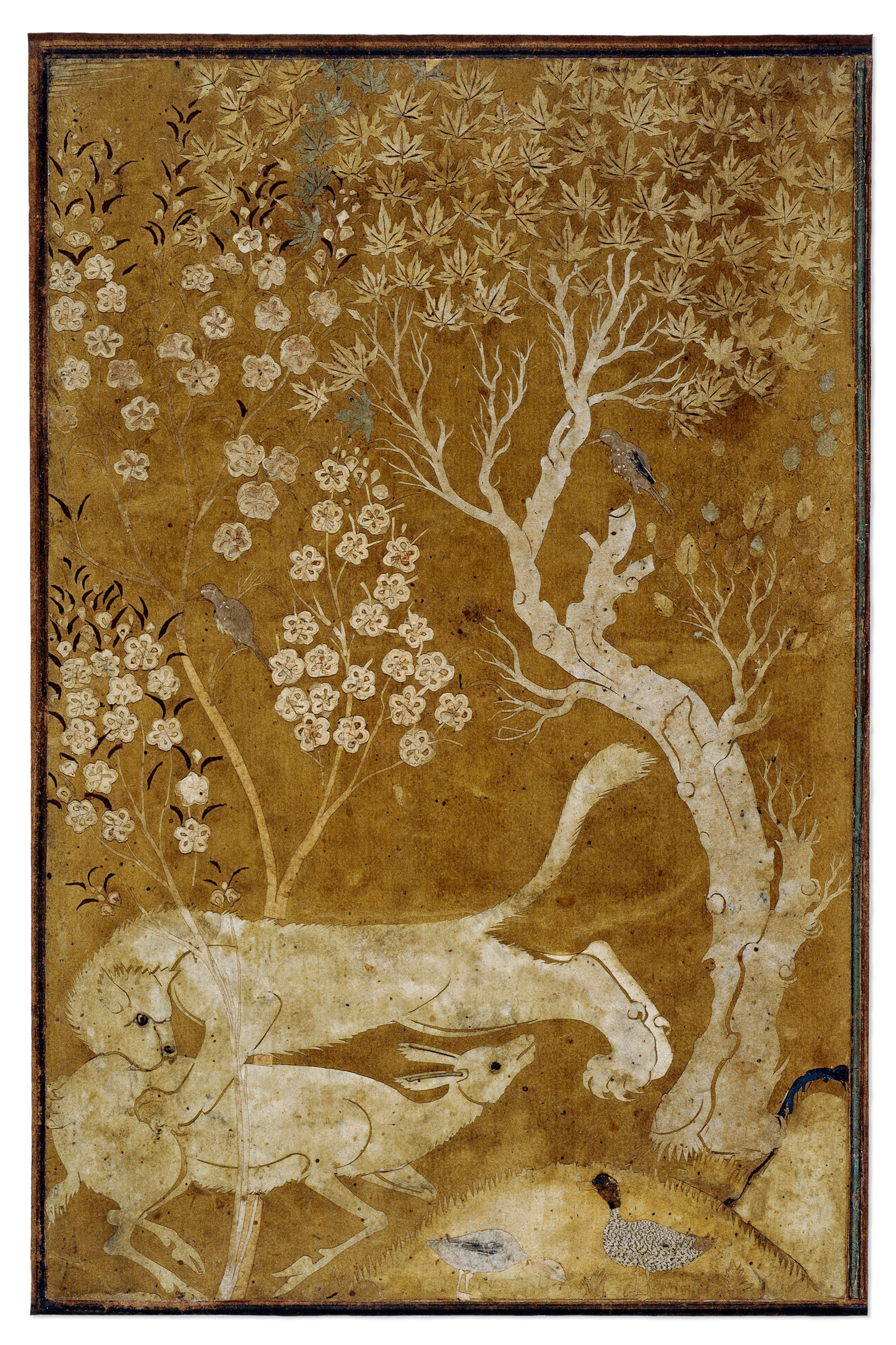
A lion attacking a deer, stencilled scene of découpage paper shapes. Ottoman, c. 1501–1550. British Museum

Decoupage or découpage (/ˌdeɪkuːˈpɑːʒ/; French: [dekupaʒ]) is the art of decorating an object by gluing colored paper cutouts onto it in combination with special paint effects, gold leaf, and other decorative elements. Commonly, an object like a small box or an item of furniture is covered by cutouts from magazines or from purpose-manufactured papers. Each layer is sealed with varnishes (often multiple coats) until the "stuck on" appearance disappears and the result looks like painting or inlay work. The traditional technique used 30 to 40 layers of varnish which were then sanded to a polished finish.

Three dimensional decoupage (sometimes also referred to simply as decoupage) is the art of creating a three-dimensional (3D) image by cutting out elements of varying sizes from a series of identical images and layering them on top of each other, usually with adhesive foam spacers between each layer to give the image more depth. Pyramid decoupage (also called pyramage) is a process similar to 3D decoupage. In pyramid decoupage, a series of identical images are cut into progressively smaller, identical shapes which are layered and fixed with adhesive foam spacers to create a 3D "pyramid" effect.

A person who does decoupage is known as a decoupeur, or "cutter".

== Origins ==
The word decoupage comes from Middle French decouper, meaning to cut out or cut from something. The origin of decoupage is thought to be East Siberian tomb art. Nomadic tribes used cut-out felts to decorate the tombs of their deceased. From Siberia, the practice came to China, and by the 12th century, cut out paper was being used to decorate lanterns, windows, boxes and other objects. In the 17th century, Italy, especially Venice, was at the forefront of trade with the Far East and it is generally thought that it is through these trade links that the cut out paper decorations made their way into Europe.

== Florentine decoupage ==
Artisans in Florence, Italy, have produced decorative objects using decoupage techniques since the 18th century. They combined decoupage with other decorative techniques already popular in Florence, such as gilt with gold leaf and carved wood designs. These older techniques were already used to produce articles such as furniture, frames for paintings, and even tooled leather book covers. Known as Florentine style crafts, these items are now highly collectible antiques. Florentine artisans made use of decoupage by adding it to the space within a carved gilt frame, or by adding the decoupage to a wooden plaque. Artisans used pasted reproductions of famous artworks, nearly always religious depictions. Florentine triptychs using decoupage images of such Biblical scenes as the Crucifixion of Jesus Christ are a common motif. As society became more secular in the early 20th century, and non–Roman Catholic tourists began buying more crafts from Florentine artisans, decoupage images became less religious in orientation and more reflective of famous Italian artworks in general.

== Notable decoupeurs ==
- Mary Delany achieved fame at the court of George III and Charlotte during the 18th-century craze for decoupage. At the age of 71 in 1771, Delany began to create cut-out paper artworks of exceptionally detailed and botanically accurate depictions of plants, produced using tissue paper and hand-colouration. Delany created 1,700 decoupage pieces, which she called her "Paper Mosaiks", between the ages of 71 and 88, when her eyesight failed. Her work can be seen in the Enlightenment Gallery at the British Museum.

== See also ==
- Japanning
