= Judy Chicago =

American artist (born 1939)

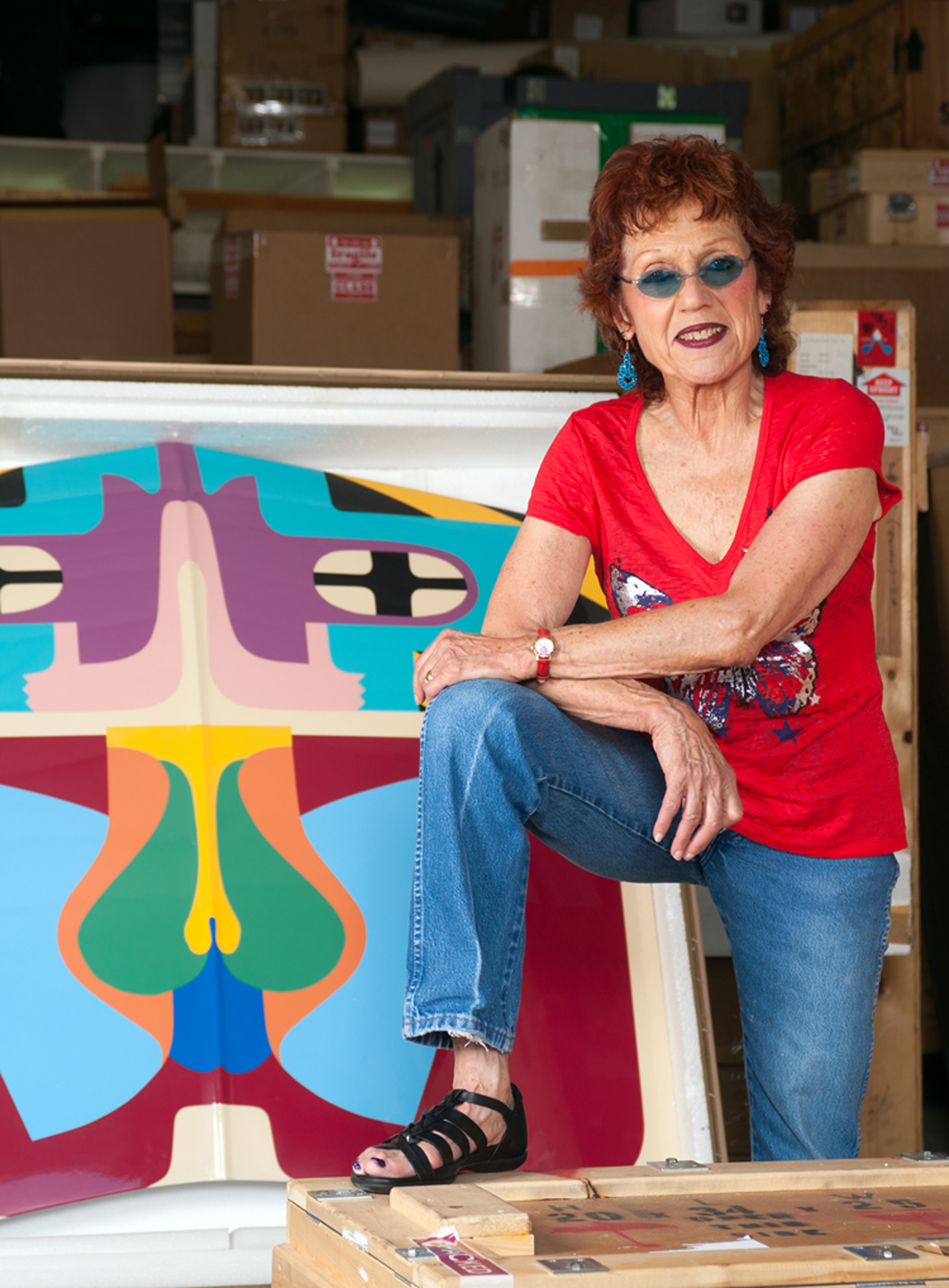
- Born: Judith Sylvia Cohen; July 20, 1939 (age 87); Chicago, Illinois, U.S.
- Known for: Installation; Painting; Sculpture
- Notable work: The Dinner Party; International Honor Quilt; Birth Project; PowerPlay; The Holocaust Project; Resolutions: A Stitch in Time; The End: A Meditation on Death and Extinction
- Movement: Contemporary; Feminist art
- Awards: Tamarind Fellowship (1972), Time magazine's "100 Most Influential People" (2018), Visionary Woman award from the Museum of Contemporary Art in Chicago (2019)
- Patrons: Anaïs Nin (mentor); Holly Harp; Elizabeth A. Sackler; Stanley Grinstein; Elyse Grinstein
- Website: judychicago.com

Judy Chicago (born Judith Sylvia Cohen; July 20, 1939) is an American feminist artist, art educator, and writer known for her large collaborative art installation pieces about birth and creation images, which examine the role of women in history and culture. During the 1970s, Chicago founded the first feminist art program in the United States at California State University, Fresno, which acted as a catalyst for feminist art and art education during the 1970s.

Chicago's work incorporates a variety of artistic skills, such as needlework, counterbalanced with skills such as welding and pyrotechnics. Her most well-known work is The Dinner Party, which is permanently installed in the Elizabeth A. Sackler Center for Feminist Art at the Brooklyn Museum. The Dinner Party celebrates the accomplishments of women throughout history and is widely regarded as the first epic feminist artwork. Other notable art projects by Chicago include International Honor Quilt, Birth Project, Powerplay, and The Holocaust Project. She is represented by Jessica Silverman gallery.

Chicago was included in Time magazine's "100 Most Influential People of 2018".

== Early life and family ==
Judy Chicago was born Judith Sylvia Cohen to Arthur and May Cohen in Chicago, Illinois, in 1939. Her father came from a 23-generation-long lineage of rabbis, including the Lithuanian Jewish Vilna Gaon. Breaking family tradition, Arthur became a labor organizer and Marxist. He worked nights at a post office and took care of Chicago during the day, while May, a former dancer, worked as a medical secretary. Arthur's active participation in the American Communist Party, liberal views of women, and support of workers' rights strongly influenced Chicago's own values and thought. During the American McCarthy era, Arthur was investigated, which made it difficult for him to find work and caused the family much turmoil. In 1945, while Chicago was alone at home with her infant brother Ben, an FBI agent visited their house. The agent began to ask the six-year-old Chicago questions about her father and his friends, but the agent was interrupted by May's return to the house. Arthur's health declined, and he died in 1953 from peritonitis. May would not discuss his death with her children and did not allow them to attend the funeral. Chicago did not come to terms with his death until she was an adult; in the early 1960s, she was hospitalized for almost a month with a bleeding ulcer.

May loved the arts and instilled her passion for them in her children. Aged three, Chicago began to draw and was sent to the Art Institute of Chicago to attend classes. By the age of five, Chicago knew that she "never wanted to do anything but make art" and continued attending extension classes at the Art Institute throughout her childhood and teens. After high school, she applied to an academic degree program at the School of the Art Institute but was denied admission, and instead attended UCLA on a scholarship.

== Education and early career ==
While at UCLA, she became politically active, designing posters for the UCLA NAACP chapter and eventually became its corresponding secretary. In June 1959, she met and dated Jerry Gerowitz. She left school and moved in with him, for the first time having her own studio space. The couple hitchhiked to New York in 1959, just as Chicago's mother and brother moved to Los Angeles to be closer to her. The couple lived in Greenwich Village for a time before returning in 1960 from Los Angeles to Chicago so she could finish her degree. Chicago married Gerowitz in 1961. She graduated with a Bachelor of Fine Arts degree in 1962 and was a member of Phi Beta Kappa society. Gerowitz died in a car crash in 1963, devastating Chicago and causing her to suffer an identity crisis for several years. She received her Master of Fine Arts from UCLA in 1964.

In graduate school, Chicago created a series that was abstract, yet easily recognized as male and female sexual organs. These early works were called Bigamy, and represented the death of her husband. One depicted an abstract penis, which was "stopped in flight" before it could unite with a vaginal form. Her professors, who were mainly men, were dismayed over these works. Despite the use of sexual organs in her work, Chicago refrained from using gender politics or identity as themes.

In 1965, Chicago displayed artwork at her first solo show, at the Rolf Nelson Gallery in Los Angeles. Chicago was one of only four female artists to take part in the show.

In 1968, Chicago was asked why she did not participate in the California Women in the Arts exhibition at the Lytton Center, to which she answered: "I won't show in any group defined as Woman, Jewish, or California. Someday, when we all grow up, there will be no labels." Chicago began working in ice sculpture, which represented "a metaphor for the preciousness of life," another reference towards her husband's death.

Study for Pasadena Lifesavers, prismacolor, 1968

In 1969, the Pasadena Art Museum exhibited a series of Chicago's spherical acrylic plastic dome sculptures and drawings in an "experimental" gallery. Art in America declared that Chicago's work was at the forefront of the conceptual art movement, and the Los Angeles Times described the work as showing no signs of "theoretical New York type art." Chicago would describe her early artwork as minimalist and as her trying to be "one of the boys." Chicago would also experiment with performance art, using fireworks and pyrotechnics to create "atmospheres," which involved flashes of colored smoke being manipulated outdoors.

During this time, Chicago also began exploring her own sexuality in her work. She created the Pasadena Lifesavers, which was a series of abstract paintings that placed acrylic paint on Plexiglas. The works blended colors to create an illusion that the shapes "turn, dissolve, open, close, vibrate, gesture, wiggle," representing her own discovery that "I was multi-orgasmic." Chicago credited "Pasadena Lifesavers", as being the major turning point in her work in relation to women's sexuality and representation.

In an interview with Art & Object magazine, Chicago reflected on her early career: “My first decade and a half of practice in Southern California, it was incredibly difficult and challenging cause the art world was so inhospitable to women. Still, within that period I built the building blocks of my career, my formal ability, my color systems, the scale I was interested in working, the level of ambition, the level at which I wanted to try and make a contribution. I had a burning desire to make art. I had a lot to say. And I made making art my reward.”

=== Name change ===
As Chicago made her name as an artist and came to know herself as a woman, she no longer felt connected to the surname Cohen. This was due to her grief from the death of her father and the lost connection to her married name Gerowitz, after her husband's death. She decided to change her last name to something independent of being connected to a man by marriage or heritage.

In 1965, she married sculptor Lloyd Hamrol. They divorced in 1979.

Gallery owner Rolf Nelson nicknamed her "Judy Chicago" because of her strong personality and strong Chicago accent. She decided this would be her new name. By legally changing her surname from the ethnically charged Gerowitz to the more neutral Chicago, she freed herself from a certain social identity. Chicago was appalled that her new husband's signature approval was required to change her name legally. To celebrate the name change, she posed for the exhibition invitation dressed as a boxer, wearing a sweatshirt with her new last name on it. She also posted a banner across the gallery at her 1970 solo show at California State University at Fullerton, that read: "Judy Gerowitz hereby divests herself of all names imposed upon her through male social dominance and chooses her own name, Judy Chicago." An advertisement with the same statement was placed in Artforum's October 1970 issue.

== Career ==
=== 1970s ===
Chicago is considered one of the "first-generation feminist artists," a group that also includes Mary Beth Edelson, Carolee Schneeman, and Rachel Rosenthal. They were part of the feminist art movement in Europe and the United States in the early 1970s to develop feminist writing and art.

In 1970, Chicago began teaching full-time at Fresno State College, hoping to teach women the skills needed to express the female perspective in their work. At Fresno, she planned a class that would consist only of women and decided to teach off campus to escape "the presence and hence, the expectations of men." She taught the first women's art class in the fall of 1970 at Fresno State College. It became the Feminist Art Program, a full 15-unit program, in the spring of 1971. This was the first feminist art program in the United States. Fifteen students studied under Chicago at Fresno State College: Dori Atlantis, Susan Boud, Gail Escola, Vanalyne Green, Suzanne Lacy, Cay Lang, Karen LeCocq, Jan Lester, Chris Rush, Judy Schaefer, Henrietta Sparkman, Faith Wilding, Shawnee Wollenman, Nancy Youdelman, and Cheryl Zurilgen. Together, as the Feminist Art Program, these women rented and refurbished an off-campus studio at 1275 Maple Avenue in downtown Fresno. Here they collaborated on art, held reading groups, and discussion groups about their life experiences which then influenced their art. All of the students and Chicago contributed $25 per month to rent the space and to pay for materials.

Later, Judy Chicago and Miriam Schapiro reestablished the Feminist Art Program at California Institute of the Arts. After Chicago left for Cal Arts, the class at Fresno State College was continued by Rita Yokoi from 1971 to 1973, and then by Joyce Aiken in 1973, until her retirement in 1992. (Note: Aiken opened the all-women's co-op Gallery 25 with her students, developed the Fresno Art Museum's Council of 100 and the Distinguished Women Artist Series, which helped develop programming and exhibitions about women at the museum.)

Chicago's image is included in the iconic 1972 poster Some Living American Women Artists by Mary Beth Edelson.

With Arlene Raven and Sheila Levrant de Bretteville, Chicago co-founded the Los Angeles Woman's Building in 1973. This art school and exhibition space was in a structure named after a pavilion at the 1893 World's Colombian Exhibition that featured art made by women from around the world. This housed the Feminist Studio Workshop, described by the founders as "an experimental program in female education in the arts". They wrote: "our purpose is to develop a new concept of art, a new kind of artist and a new art community built from the lives, feelings, and needs of women." During this period Chicago began creating spray-painted canvases, primarily abstract, with geometric forms on them. These works evolved, using the same medium, to become more centered around the meaning of the "feminine". Chicago was strongly influenced by Gerda Lerner.

Chicago's first book, Through the Flower (1975), "chronicled her struggles to find her own identity as a woman artist".

==== Womanhouse ====
Womanhouse was a project by Chicago and Miriam Schapiro, beginning in fall 1971 once Chicago became a teacher at the California Institute of the Arts. In 1972, Chicago and Schapiro founded the Feminist Art Program at the California Institute of the Arts, which was the first art exhibition space to display a female point of view in art, and chose 21 female students for the course. They wanted to start the year with a large scale collaborative project that involved female artists who spent much of their time talking about their experiences as women. They used these ideas as fuel and dealt with them while working on the project.

The idea for Womanhouse was sparked during a discussion they had early in the course about the home as a place with which women were traditionally associated, and they wanted to highlight the realities of womanhood, wifehood, and motherhood within the home. Chicago thought that female students often approach art-making with an unwillingness to push their limits due to their lack of familiarity with tools and processes, and an inability to see themselves as working people. "The aim of the Feminist Art Program is to help women restructure their personalities to be more consistent with their desires to be artists and to help them build their art-making out of their experiences as women."

==== The Dinner Party ====

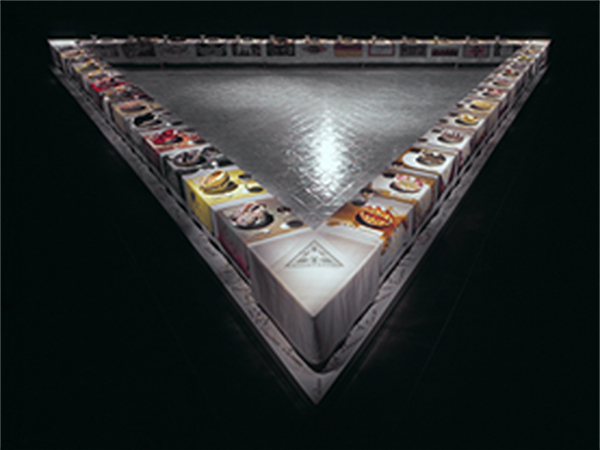
The Dinner Party as installed at the Brooklyn Museum

Inspired by Lerner, Chicago developed The Dinner Party, now in the collection of the Brooklyn Museum. It took her five years to create and cost about $250,000 to complete. First, Chicago conceived the project in her Santa Monica studio: a large triangle, which measures 48 feet by 43 feet by 36 feet, consisting of 39 place settings. Each place commemorates a historical or mythical female figure, such as artists, goddesses, activists, and martyrs. Thirteen women are represented on each side. The embroidered table runners are stitched in the style and technique of the featured woman's time. Numerous other names of women are engraved in the "Heritage Floor" upon which the piece sits. The project came into fruition with the assistance of over 400 people, mainly women, who volunteered to assist in needlework, creating sculptures and other aspects of the process. When The Dinner Party was first constructed, it was a traveling exhibition. Through the Flower, her non-profit organization, was originally created to cover the expense of the creation and travel of the artwork. Jane Gerhard dedicated a book to Judy Chicago and The Dinner Party, entitled "The Dinner Party: Judy Chicago and The Power of Popular Feminism, 1970–2007."

Many art critics, including Hilton Kramer from The New York Times, were unimpressed by her work. Mr. Kramer felt Chicago's intended vision was not conveyed through this piece and "it looked like an outrageous libel on the female imagination." Although art critics felt her work lacked depth and the dinner party was just "vaginas on plates," it was popular and captivated the general public. Chicago debuted her work in six countries on three continents. She reached over a million people through her artwork.

In a 1981 interview, Chicago said that the backlash of threats and hateful castigation in reaction to the work brought on the only period of suicide risk she'd ever experienced in her life, characterizing herself as "like a wounded animal". She stated that she sought refuge from public attention by moving to a small rural community and that friends and acquaintances took on administrative support roles for her, such as opening her mail, while she threw herself into working on Embroidering Our Heritage, the book documenting the project. She further said,

If I go forward now it's because of a network of support that's being built that will allow me to go forward. My destiny as an artist is totally tied up with my destiny as a member of the female sex. And as we as women move forward, I move forward. That's something that's very, very hard to accept because, it's like, I could not do it all the way either; but I've come a long way, I know I've come a long way. And that means that other women can come that far, and farther.

=== 1980s and 1990s ===
In 1985, Chicago married photographer Donald Woodman.

In 1994, Chicago started the series Resolutions: A Stitch in Time, completed over a six-year period. Six years later, Resolutions: A Stitch in Time was exhibited to the public at the Museum of Art and Design in New York.

In 1996, Chicago and Woodman moved into the Belen Hotel, an historic railroad hotel in Belen, New Mexico which Woodman had spent three years converting into a home.

In 1999, Chicago received the UCLA Alumni Professional Achievement Award, and was awarded honorary degrees from Lehigh University, Smith College, Duke University and Russell Sage College.

==== Birth Project and PowerPlay ====
From 1980 to 1985 Chicago created Birth Project. The piece used images of childbirth to celebrate woman's role as mother. Chicago was inspired to create this collective work because of the lack of imagery and representation of birth in the art world. Judy Chicago famously said "If men could give birth, there would be millions of representations of the crowning." The installation reinterpreted the Genesis creation narrative, which focused on the idea that a male god created a male human, Adam, without the involvement of a woman. Chicago described the piece as revealing a "primordial female self hidden among the recesses of my soul...the birthing woman is part of the dawn of creation." 150 needleworkers from the United States, Canada and New Zealand assisted in the project, working on 100 panels, by quilting, macramé, embroidery and other techniques. The size of the piece means it is rarely displayed in its entirety. The majority of the pieces from Birth Project are held in the collection of the Albuquerque Museum.

Chicago was not personally interested in motherhood. While she admired the women who chose this path she did not find it right for herself. In 2012, she said, "There was no way on this earth I could have had children and the career I've had."

Overlapping with Birth Project, Chicago started working independently on PowerPlay in 1982: a series of large-scale paintings, drawings, cast paper reliefs and bronze reliefs. What both the series, however, have in common is that their subject matters deal with issues rarely depicted in Western art. The PowerPlay series was inspired by Chicago's trip to Italy, where she saw the masterpieces of Renaissance artists representing the Western artistic tradition. As Judy Chicago wrote in her autobiographical book: “I was to be greatly influenced by actually seeing the major Renaissance paintings. Looking at their monumental scale and clarity led me to decide to cast my examination of masculinity in the classical tradition of the heroic nude and to do so in a series of large-scale oil paintings.”

The titles of the works such as Crippled by the Need to Control/Blind Individuality, Pissing on Nature, Driving the World to Destruction, In the Shadow of the Handgun, Disfigured by Power, etc., indicate Chicago's focus on male violent behaviour. However, the brightly coloured images of facial expressions and parts of male bodies express not only aggression and power but also vulnerability. Chicago's husband Donald Woodman posed for the piece Woe/Man. She depended “upon [her] own sense of truth, working from observation, experience, and, of course, [her] rage at how destructively so many men seem to act toward women and the world at large.”

By depicting male bodies Chicago replaced the traditional male gaze with a female one. As she said: “I knew that I didn’t want to keep perpetuating the use of the female body as the repository of so many emotions; it seemed as if everything – love, dread, longing, loathing, desire, and terror – was projected onto the female by both male and female artists, albeit with often differing perspectives. I wondered what feelings the male body might be made to express.”

==== The Holocaust Project ====
In the mid-1980s Chicago's interests "shifted beyond 'issues of female identity' to an exploration of masculine power and powerlessness in the context of the Holocaust." Chicago's The Holocaust Project: From Darkness into Light (1985–93) is a collaboration with her husband, photographer Donald Woodman, whom she married on New Year's Eve 1985. Although Chicago's previous husbands were both Jewish, it was not until she met Woodman that she began to explore her own Jewish heritage. Chicago met poet Harvey Mudd, who had written an epic poem about the Holocaust. Chicago was interested in illustrating the poem, but decided to create her own work instead, using her own art, visual and written. Chicago worked alongside her husband to complete the piece, which took eight years to finish. The piece, which documents victims of the Holocaust, was created during a time of personal loss in Chicago's life: the death of her brother Ben from Lou Gehrig's disease, and the death of her mother from cancer.

Chicago used the Holocaust as a prism through which to explore victimization, oppression, injustice, and human cruelty. To seek inspiration for the project, Chicago and Woodman watched the documentary Shoah, which comprises interviews with Holocaust survivors at Nazi concentration camps and other Holocaust sites. They also explored photo archives and written pieces about the Holocaust. They spent several months touring concentration camps and visited Israel. Chicago brought other issues into the work, such as environmentalism, Native American genocide, and the Vietnam War. With these subjects Chicago sought to relate contemporary issues to the moral dilemma behind the Holocaust. This aspect of the work caused controversy within the Jewish community, due to the comparison of the Holocaust to these other historical and contemporary concerns. The Holocaust Project: From Darkness into Light consists of sixteen large-scale works made of a variety of mediums including: tapestry, stained glass, metal work, wood work, photography, painting, and the sewing of Audrey Cowan. The exhibit ends with a piece that displays a Jewish couple at Sabbath. The piece comprises 3000 square feet, providing a full exhibition experience for the viewer. The Holocaust Project: From Darkness into Light was exhibited for the first time in October 1993 at the Spertus Museum in Chicago. Most of the work from the piece is held at the Holocaust Center in Pittsburgh, Pennsylvania.

Over the next six years Chicago created works that explored the experiences of concentration camp victims. Galit Mana of Jewish Renaissance magazine notes, "This shift in focus led Chicago to work on other projects with an emphasis on Jewish tradition", including Voices from the Song of Songs (1997), where Chicago "introduces feminism and female sexuality into her representation of strong biblical female characters."

=== 21st century ===
From October 11, 2002, to January 5, 2003, the National Museum of Women in the Arts exhibited Judy Chicago, which exhibited “over 90 works as well as documentary photographs, many taken by her husband photographer Donald Woodman, [that] chronicle important periods, significant projects, and her transformation as an artist.”

In 2004, Chicago received a Visionary Woman Award from Moore College of Art & Design. She was named a National Women's History Project honoree for Women's History Month in 2008.

To celebrate her 25th wedding anniversary with Woodman, she created a Renewal Ketubah in 2010.

In 2011, Chicago returned to Los Angeles for the opening of the "Concurrents" exhibition at the Getty Museum and performed a firework-based installation piece in the Pomona College football field, a site where she had previously performed in the 1960s. Chicago also donated her collection of feminist art educational materials to Penn State University.

Chicago had two solo exhibitions in the United Kingdom in 2012, one in London and another in Liverpool. The Liverpool exhibition included the launch of Chicago's book about Virginia Woolf. Once a peripheral part of her artistic expression, Chicago now considers writing to be well integrated into her career. That year, she was also awarded the Lifetime Achievement Award at the Palm Springs Art Fair.

From January 17 to April 13, 2014, the National Museum of Women in the Arts exhibited Judy Chicago: Circa ’75. The exhibition celebrated Chicago’s 75th birthday by examining “13 of her artworks that paralleled and influenced the U.S. feminist movement of the 1970s.”

She was interviewed for the 2018 film !Women Art Revolution. In an interview with Gloria Steinem in 2018, Chicago described her "goal as an artist" has been “to create images in which the female experience is the path to the universal, as opposed to learning everything through the male gaze."

From September 19, 2019, to January 20, 2020, the National Museum of Women in the Arts exhibited Judy Chicago—The End: A Meditation on Death and Extinction. “In nearly 40 works of painted porcelain and glass, as well as two large bronze sculptures, Chicago tackles human mortality and species extinction.”

In 2021, she was inducted into the National Women's Hall of Fame. A major retrospective exhibition, titled Judy Chicago: A Retrospective, was displayed at the De Young Museum in San Francisco in 2021; it was Judy Chicago's first retrospective.

Chicago's work was included in the 2021 exhibition Women in Abstraction at the Centre Pompidou.

In 2022, Chicago collaborated with Nadya Tolokonnikova to transform her What if Women Ruled the World? series into a participatory art project, enabled by blockchain with the hopes of spawning a Web3 community dedicated to gender rights.

Chicago strives to push herself, exploring new directions for her art; early in her career, she attended car-body school to learn to air-brush and has expanded her practice to include a variety of media including glass. Taking such risks is easier to do when one lives by Chicago's philosophy: "I'm not career driven. Damien Hirst's dots sold, so he made thousands of dots. I would, like, never do that! It wouldn't even occur to me."

From October 2023 to early March 2024, Chicago's work was featured across four floors of the New Museum in New York City in a comprehensive museum survey of her work titled Judy Chicago: Herstory.

Her work was included in the 2024 exhibition Making Their Mark: Works from the Shah Garg Collection at the Berkeley Art Museum and Pacific Film Archive (BAMPFA).

== Collections (selection) ==
Chicago's artwork is held in the permanent collections of several museums including The British Museum, The Brooklyn Museum, The Getty Trust, The Los Angeles County Museum of Art, New Mexico Museum of Art, The National Gallery of Art, The National Museum of Women in the Arts, The Pennsylvania Academy of the Fine Arts, the Pérez Art Museum Miami, and The San Francisco Museum of Modern Art. Her archives are held at the Schlesinger Library at Radcliffe College, and her collection of women's history and culture books are held in the collection of the University of New Mexico.

== Style and work ==
Chicago drew inspiration from the 'ordinary' woman, a central focus of the early 1970s feminist movement. This influenced her work, notably in The Dinner Party, reflecting her fascination with textile work and craft often culturally associated with women. Chicago trained herself in "macho arts", taking classes in auto body work, boatbuilding and pyrotechnics. Through auto body work she learned spray painting techniques and the skill to fuse color and surface to any type of media, which would become a signature of her later work. The skills learned through boat building would be used in her sculpture work, and pyrotechnics would be used to create fireworks for performance pieces. These skills allowed Chicago to bring fiberglass and metal into her sculpture, and eventually she would become an apprentice under Mim Silinsky to learn the art of porcelain painting, which would be used to create works in The Dinner Party. Chicago also added the skill of stained glass to her artistic tool belt, which she used for The Holocaust Project. Photography became more present in Chicago's work as her relationship with photographer Donald Woodman developed. Since 2003, Chicago has been working with glass.

Collaboration is a major aspect of Chicago's installation works. The Dinner Party, Birth Project, and Resolutions were all completed as a collaborative process with Chicago and hundreds of volunteer participants. Volunteer artisans skills vary, often connected to "stereotypical" women's arts such as textile arts. Chicago makes a point to acknowledge her assistants as collaborators, a task at which other artists have notably failed.

== Through the Flower ==
In 1978 Chicago founded Through the Flower, a non-profit feminist art organization. The organization seeks to educate the public about the importance of art and how it can be used as a tool to emphasize women's achievements. Through the Flower also serves as the maintainer of Chicago's works, having handled the storage of The Dinner Party, before it found a permanent home at the Brooklyn Museum. The organization also maintained The Dinner Party Curriculum, which serves as a "living curriculum" for education about feminist art ideas and pedagogy. The online aspect of the curriculum was donated to Penn State University in 2011.

== Teaching career ==
Chicago became aware of the sexism that was rampant in modern art institutions, museums, and schools while getting her undergraduate and graduate degree at UCLA in the 1960s. She did not challenge this sexism as an undergrad. In fact, she did quite the opposite by trying to match — both in her artwork and in her personal style — what she thought of as masculinity in the artistic styles and habits of her male counterparts. This included working with heavy industrial materials, smoking cigars, dressing in a "masculine" way, and attending motorcycle shows. This awareness continued to grow as she recognized how society did not see women as professional artists in the same way they recognized men. Angered by this, Chicago channeled this energy and used it to strengthen her feminist values as a person and teacher. While most teachers based their lessons on technique, visual forms, and color, the foundation for Chicago's teachings were on the content and social significance of the art, especially in feminism. Stemming from the male-dominated art community Chicago studied with for so many years, she valued art based on research, social or political views, and/or experience. She wanted her students to grow into their art professions without having to sacrifice what womanhood meant to them. Chicago developed an art education methodology in which "female-centered content", such as menstruation and giving birth, is encouraged by the teacher as "personal is political" content for art. Chicago advocates the teacher as facilitator by actively listening to students in order to guide content searches and the translation of content into art. She refers to her teaching methodology as "participatory art pedagogy."

The art created in the Feminist Art Program and Womanhouse introduced perspectives and content about women's lives that had been taboo topics in society, including the art world. In 1970 Chicago developed the Feminist Art Program at California State University, Fresno, and has implemented other teaching projects that conclude with an art exhibition by students such as Womanhouse with Miriam Schapiro at CalArts, and SINsation in 1999 at Indiana University, From Theory to Practice: A Journey of Discovery at Duke University in 2000, At Home: A Kentucky Project with Judy Chicago and Donald Woodman at Western Kentucky University in 2002, Envisioning the Future at California Polytechnic State University and Pomona Arts Colony in 2004, and Evoke/Invoke/Provoke at Vanderbilt University in 2005. Several students involved in Judy Chicago's teaching projects established successful careers as artists, including Suzanne Lacy, Faith Wilding, and Nancy Youdelman.

In the early 2000s Chicago organized her teaching style into three parts: preparation, process, and art-making. Each has a specific purpose and is crucial. During the preparation phase, students identify a deep personal concern and then research that issue. In the process phase, students gather together in a group to discuss the materials they plan on using and the content of their work. Finally, in the art-making phase, students find materials, sketch, critique, and produce art.

In 2022, Judy Chicago and Donald Woodman returned to education after 50 years since Womanhouse's debut. Wo/Manhouse 2022, located in Belen, New Mexico, featured 19 New Mexico-based artists exploring gender roles, identity, family, labor, and more through site-specific artworks in a 1950s-style house. The project was facilitated by original Womanhouse participant Nancy Youdelman.

== Books by Chicago ==
- The Dinner Party: A Symbol of our Heritage. Garden City, NY: Anchor Press/Doubleday (1979). ISBN 0-385-14567-5.
- with Susan Hill. Embroidering Our Heritage: The Dinner Party Needlework. Garden City, NY: Anchor Press/Doubleday (1980). ISBN 0-385-14569-1.
- The Birth Project. New York: Doubleday (1985). ISBN 0-385-18710-6.
- Beyond the Flower: The Autobiography of a Feminist Artist. New York: Penguin (1997). ISBN 0-14-023297-4.
- Kitty City: A Feline Book of Hours. New York: Harper Design (2005). ISBN 0-06-059581-7.
- Through the Flower: My Struggle as a Woman Artist. Lincoln: Authors Choice Press (2006). ISBN 0-595-38046-8.
- with Frances Borzello. Frida Kahlo: Face to Face. New York: Prestel USA (2010). ISBN 3-7913-4360-2.
- Institutional Time: A Critique of Studio Art Education. New York: The Monacelli Press (2014). ISBN 9781580933667.
- The Flowering: The Autobiography of Judy Chicago. Thames & Hudson USA (2021). ISBN 0500094381, 9780500094389

== Cited sources ==
- Anon (2018). "Artist, Curator & Critic Interviews". !Women Art Revolution – Spotlight at Stanford. Archived from the original on March 26, 2018.
- Bloch, Avital and Lauri Umansky (eds.). Impossible to Hold: Women and Culture in the 1960s. New York: NYU Press (2005). ISBN 0-8147-9910-8.
- Felder, Deborah G. and Diana Rosen. Fifty Jewish Women Who Changed the World. Yucca Valley: Citadel (2005). ISBN 0-8065-2656-4.
- Lewis, Richard L. and Susan Ingalls Lewis. The Power of Art. Florence: Wadsworth (2008). ISBN 0-534-64103-2.
- Wylder, Viki D. Thompson and Lucy R. Lippard. Judy Chicago: Trials and Tributes. Tallahassee: Florida State University Museum of Fine Arts (1999). ISBN 1-889282-05-7.
