= Vanalyne Green =

American artist

- Born: 1948
- Known for: Artists, author, educator

Vanalyne Green (born 1948) is an American artist who also teaches and writes about culture. She has screened her video work extensively in the United States and abroad, including The Whitney Biennial (1991), American Film Institute, Rotterdam International Film Festival, the Videotheque de Paris, The Robert Flaherty Film Seminar, The Guggenheim Museum and many other museums, universities and film festivals. She has received a Guggenheim Foundation fellowship, as well as grants from Creative Capital, the Jerome Foundation, the Richard H. Driehaus Foundation (2003), the National Endowment for the Arts, the New York State Council of the Arts, and a Rome Prize at the American Academy in Rome (2001–2002). Her work has been covered in the Village Voice, the Los Angeles Weekly, The Chicago Reader, and Artforum. Publications by and about, and interviews with, Green also can be found in "Performance Artists Talking in the Eighties" by Linda M. Montano, "Women of Vision" by Alexandra Juhasz, in addition to M/E/A/N/I/N/G: An Anthology of Artists' Writings, Theory, and Criticism. Green's videotape "A Spy in the House that Ruth Built" was listed as one of the 1,000 best films ever made by film critic and author Jonathan Rosenbaum.

Vanalyne Green studied art at Fresno State University in the first feminist art program started by Judy Chicago and then at California Institute of the Arts with Sheila Levrant de Bretteville, where she earned a BFA degree in 1974. Green was a member of the Feminist Art Workers in Los Angeles. The group adopted a non-hierarchical structure and employed feminist pedagogy to create interactive, participatory performance art. In New York City, she was a founding member of the pro-choice, pro-sex agit-prop group "No More Nice Girls". And later in Chicago, Green was a founding member of the collaborative group Feel Tank Chicago, which plays on the notion of the think tank and engages with the role of emotions and affect in politics.

Green was appointed a Professor of Fine Art at the University of Leeds in 2004. She was chair of Undergraduate Fine Art at Art Center College of Design from 2013 to 2015 and has also taught at School of the Art Institute of Chicago, Temple University, and the Ecole des Beaux-Arts in Paris.
