= List of feminist art critics =

This is a list of feminist art critics. The list includes art critics that "reflect a woman's consciousness about women" and who have played a role in the feminist art movement. It includes second-wave and third-wave feminist critics.

== B ==
- Judith Barry
- Rosemary Betterton
- Lisa E. Bloom
- Frances Borzello
- Norma Broude

== C ==
- Whitney Chadwick

== D ==
- Pen Dalton
- Carol Duncan
- Katy Deepwell
- Debbie Duffin

== E ==
- Lee R. Edwards

== F ==
- Joanna Fateman
- Mathilde Ferrer
- Sandy Flitterman-Lewis
- Joanna Frueh

== G ==
- Shrifra Goldman
- Mary Garrard
- Alison M. Gingeras

== H ==
- Paula Harper
- Maryse Holder
- Elizabeth Hess

== I ==
- Kornelia Imesch

== J ==
- Carol Jacobsen
- Jennifer John

== L ==
- Cassandra L. Langer
- Teresa de Lauretis
- Estella Lauter
- Lucy R. Lippard

== M ==
- Elizabeth A. MacGregor
- Patricia Mathews "Go Gentle"
- Marsha Meskimmon
- Daniela Mondini

== N ==
- Cynthia Navaretta
- Linda Nochlin "Why Are There No Great Women Artists?"

== O ==
- Gloria Feman Orenstein

== P ==
- Rozsika Parker
- Griselda Pollock

== R ==
- Arlene Raven
- Amy Richards
- Moira Roth

== S ==
- Kristine Stiles
- Lowery Stokes Sims

== T ==
- Gilane Tawadros

== V ==
- Lea Vergine
- Lise Vogel

== W ==
- Val A. Walsh
- Josephine Withers
- Janet Wolff
- Ann-Sargent Wooster
