= Feminist theory =

Feminist theory is the extension of feminism into theoretical, fictional, or philosophical discourse. It aims to understand the nature of gender inequality. It examines women's and men's social roles, experiences, interests, chores, and feminist politics in a variety of fields, such as anthropology and sociology, communication, media studies, psychoanalysis, political theory, home economics, literature, education, and philosophy.

Feminist theory often focuses on analyzing gender inequality. Themes often explored in feminist theory include discrimination, objectification (especially sexual objectification), oppression, patriarchy, stereotyping, art history and contemporary art, and aesthetics.

== History ==
"The Changing Woman" is a Navajo myth that gave credit to a woman who, in the end, populated the world. By the 1790s, the leading feminist voice in both the U.K. and U.S. was Mary Wollstonecraft, whose A Vindication of the Rights of Woman (1792) was influenced by the lesser-known American Judith Sargent Murray. Both women asserted that the best route to improving women's condition is education. Their ideas influenced American Charles Brockden Brown, who wrote Dialogues of Alcuin in 1797. The Anglophone world saw no feminist theory of note until "Men and Women: Brief Hypothesis Concerning the Difference in their Genius" (1824) by American John Neal, who repeated Wollstonecraft's and Murray's theories, but added the assertion that women are unlike, but not inferior to men. This and other essays by Neal in the 1820s filled an intellectual gap between female scholars in the 1790s and those surrounding the 1848 Seneca Falls Convention. As a male writer insulated from many common forms of attack against female feminist thinkers, Neal's advocacy was crucial in bringing the field back into the mainstream in the U.K. and the U.S. By the time of the convention, writing by Neal, Sarah Grimké, and Margaret Fuller had solidified ideas from sporadic publications over the previous sixty years into a movement that reached a wider audience.

In 1851, Sojourner Truth addressed women's rights issues through her publication, "Ain't I a Woman". Sojourner Truth addressed the issue of women having limited rights due to men's flawed perception of women. Truth argued that if a woman of color can perform tasks that were supposedly limited to men, then any woman of any color could perform those same tasks. After her arrest for illegally voting, Susan B. Anthony gave a speech within court in which she addressed the issues of language within the constitution documented in her publication, "Speech after Arrest for Illegal voting" in 1872. Anthony questioned the authoritative principles of the constitution and its male-gendered language. She raised the question of why women are accountable to be punished under law but they cannot use the law for their own protection (women could not vote, own property, nor maintain custody of themselves in marriage). She also critiqued the constitution for its male-gendered language and questioned why women should have to abide by laws that do not specify women.

Nancy Cott makes a distinction between modern feminism and its antecedents, particularly the struggle for suffrage. In the United States she places the turning point in the decades before and after women obtained the vote in 1920 (1910–1930). She argues that the prior woman movement was primarily about woman as a universal entity, whereas over this 20-year period it transformed itself into one primarily concerned with social differentiation, attentive to individuality and diversity. New issues dealt more with woman's condition as a social construct, gender identity, and relationships within and between genders. Politically, this represented a shift from an ideological alignment comfortable with the right, to one more radically associated with the left.

Susan Kingsley Kent says that Freudian patriarchy was responsible for the diminished profile of feminism in the inter-war years, others such as Juliet Mitchell consider this to be overly simplistic since Freudian theory is not wholly incompatible with feminism. Some feminist scholarship shifted away from the need to establish the origins of family, and towards analyzing the process of patriarchy. In the immediate postwar period, Simone de Beauvoir stood in opposition to an image of "the woman in the home". De Beauvoir provided an existentialist dimension to feminism with the publication of Le Deuxième Sexe (The Second Sex) in 1949. As the title implies, the starting point is the implicit inferiority of women, and the first question de Beauvoir asks is "what is a woman"? A woman she realizes is always perceived of as the "other", "she is defined and differentiated with reference to man and not he with reference to her". In this book and her essay, "Woman: Myth & Reality", de Beauvoir anticipates Betty Friedan in seeking to demythologize the male concept of woman. "A myth invented by men to confine women to their oppressed state. For women, it is not a question of asserting themselves as women, but of becoming full-scale human beings." "One is not born, but rather becomes, a woman", or as Toril Moi puts it "a woman defines herself through the way she lives her embodied situation in the world, or in other words, through the way in which she makes something of what the world makes of her". Therefore, the woman must regain subject, to escape her defined role as "other", as a Cartesian point of departure. In her examination of myth, she appears as one who does not accept any special privileges for women. Ironically, feminist philosophers have had to extract de Beauvoir herself from out of the shadow of Jean-Paul Sartre to fully appreciate her. While more philosopher and novelist than activist, she did sign one of the Mouvement de Libération des Femmes manifestos.

The resurgence of feminist activism in the late 1960s was accompanied by an emerging literature of concerns for the earth and spirituality, and environmentalism. This, in turn, created an atmosphere conducive to reigniting the study of and debate on matricentricity, as a rejection of determinism, such as Adrienne Rich and Marilyn French while for socialist feminists like Evelyn Reed, patriarchy held the properties of capitalism. Feminist psychologists, such as Jean Baker Miller, sought to bring a feminist analysis to previous psychological theories, proving that "there was nothing wrong with women, but rather with the way modern culture viewed them".

Elaine Showalter describes the development of feminist theory as having a number of phases. The first she calls "feminist critique" – where the feminist reader examines the ideologies behind literary phenomena. The second Showalter calls "Gynocritics" – where the "woman is producer of textual meaning" including "the psychodynamics of female creativity; linguistics and the problem of a female language; the trajectory of the individual or collective female literary career and literary history". The last phase she calls "gender theory" – where the "ideological inscription and the literary effects of the sex/gender system" are explored". This model has been criticized by Toril Moi who sees it as an essentialist and deterministic model for female subjectivity. She also criticized it for not taking account of the situation for women outside the west. From the 1970s onwards, psychoanalytical ideas that have been arising in the field of French feminism have gained a decisive influence on feminist theory. Feminist psychoanalysis deconstructed the phallic hypotheses regarding the Unconscious. Julia Kristeva, Bracha Ettinger and Luce Irigaray developed specific notions concerning unconscious sexual difference, the feminine, and motherhood, with wide implications for film and literature analysis.

In the 1990s and the first decades of the 21st century, intersectionality played a major role in feminist theory, leading to the development of transfeminism and queer feminism and the consolidation of Black, anti-racist and postcolonial feminisms, among others. The rise of the fourth wave in the 2010s led to new discussions on sexual violence, consent and body positivity, as well as a deepening of intersectional perspectives. Simultaneously, feminist philosophy and anthropology saw a rise in new materialist, affect-oriented, posthumanist and ecofeminist perspectives.

== Disciplines ==
There are a number of distinct feminist disciplines, in which experts in other areas apply feminist techniques and principles to their own fields. Additionally, these are also debates which shape feminist theory and they can be applied interchangeably in the arguments of feminist theorists.

=== Bodies ===
In Western thought, the body has been historically associated solely with women, whereas men have been associated with the mind. Susan Bordo, a modern feminist philosopher, in her writings elaborates the dualistic nature of the mind/body connection by examining the early philosophies of Aristotle, Hegel, and Descartes, revealing how such distinguishing binaries such as spirit/matter and male activity/female passivity have worked to solidify gender characteristics and categorization. Bordo goes on to point out that while men have historically been associated with the intellect and the mind or spirit, women have long been associated with the body, the subordinated, negatively imbued term in the mind/body dichotomy.

The notion of the body (but not the mind) being associated with women has served as a justification to deem women as property, objects, and exchangeable commodities (among men). For example, women's bodies have been objectified throughout history through the changing ideologies of fashion, diet, exercise programs, cosmetic surgery, childbearing, etc. This contrasts to men's role as a moral agent, responsible for working or fighting in bloody wars. The race and class of a woman can determine whether her body will be treated as decoration and protected, which is associated with middle or upper-class women's bodies. On the other hand, the other body is recognized for its use in labor and exploitation which is generally associated with women's bodies in the working-class or with women of color. Second-wave feminist activism has argued for reproductive rights and choice. The women's health movement and lesbian feminism are also associated with this Bodies debate.

=== The standard and contemporary sex and gender system ===
The standard sex determination and gender model consists of evidence based on the determined sex and gender of every individual and serve as norms for societal life. The model that the sex-determination of a person exists within a male/female dichotomy, giving importance to genitals and how they are formed via chromosomes and DNA-binding proteins (such as the sex-determining region Y genes), which are responsible for sending sex-determined initialization and completion signals to and from the biological sex-determination system in fetuses. Occasionally, variations occur during the sex-determining process, resulting in intersex conditions. The standard model defines gender as a social understanding/ideology that defines what behaviors, actions, and appearances are normal for males and females. Studies into biological sex-determining systems also have begun working towards connecting certain gender conducts such as behaviors, actions, and desires with sex-determinism.

==== Socially-biasing children sex and gender system ====
The socially biasing children's sex and gender model broadens the horizons of the sex and gender ideologies. It revises the ideology of sex to be a social construct that is not limited to either male or female. The Intersex Society of North America which explains that "nature doesn't decide where the category of 'male' ends and the category of 'intersex' begins, or where the category of 'intersex' ends and the category of 'female' begins. Humans decide. Humans (today, typically doctors) decide how small a penis has to be, or how unusual a combination of parts has to be before it counts as intersex". Therefore, sex is not a biological/natural construct but a social one instead since, society and doctors decide on what it means to be male, female, or intersex in terms of sex chromosomes and genitals, in addition to their personal judgment on who or how one passes as specific sex. The ideology of gender remains a social construct but is not as strict and fixed. Instead, gender is easily malleable and is forever changing. One example of where the standard definition of gender alters with time happens to be depicted in Sally Shuttleworth's Female Circulation in which the "abasement of the woman, reducing her from an active participant in the labor market to the passive bodily existence to be controlled by male expertise is indicative of the ways in which the ideological deployment of gender roles operated to facilitate and sustain the changing structure of familial and market relations in Victorian England". In other words, this quote shows what it meant growing up into the roles of a female (gender/roles) changed from being a homemaker to being a working woman and then back to being passive and inferior to males. In conclusion, the contemporary sex gender model is accurate because both sex and gender are rightly seen as social constructs inclusive of the wide spectrum of sexes and genders and in which nature and nurture are interconnected.

=== Epistemologies ===
Questions about how knowledge is produced, generated, and distributed have been central to Western conceptions of feminist theory and discussions on feminist epistemology. One debate proposes such questions as "Are there 'women's ways of knowing' and 'women's knowledge'?" And "How does the knowledge women produce about themselves differ from that produced by patriarchy?" Feminist theorists have also proposed the "feminist standpoint knowledge" which attempts to replace the "view from nowhere" with the model of knowing that expels the "view from women's lives". A feminist approach to epistemology seeks to establish knowledge production from a woman's perspective. It theorizes that from personal experience comes knowledge which helps each individual look at things from a different insight.

It is central to feminism that women are systematically subordinated, and bad faith exists when women surrender their agency to this subordination (for example, acceptance of religious beliefs that a man is the dominant party in a marriage by the will of God). Simone de Beauvoir labels such women "mutilated" and "immanent".

=== Intersectionality ===
Intersectionality is the examination of various ways in which people are oppressed, based on the relational web of dominating factors of race, sex, class, nation and sexual orientation. Intersectionality "describes the simultaneous, multiple, overlapping, and contradictory systems of power that shape our lives and political options". While this theory can be applied to all people, and more particularly all women, it is specifically mentioned and studied within the realms of black feminism. Patricia Hill Collins argues that black women in particular, have a unique perspective on the oppression of the world as unlike white women, they face both racial and gender oppression simultaneously, among other factors. This debate raises the issue of understanding the oppressive lives of women that are not only shaped by gender alone but by other elements such as racism, classism, ageism, heterosexism, ableism, transphobia etc.

=== Language ===
In this debate, women writers have addressed the issues of masculinized writing through male gendered language that may not serve to accommodate the literary understanding of women's lives. Such masculinized language that feminist theorists address is the use of, for example, "God the Father", which is looked upon as a way of designating the sacred as solely men (or, in other words, biblical language glorifies men through all of the masculine pronouns like "he" and "him" and addressing God as a "He"). Feminist theorists attempt to reclaim and redefine women through a deeper thinking of language. For example, feminist theorists have used the term "womyn" instead of "women". Some feminist theorists have suggested using neutral terminology when naming jobs (for example, police officer versus policeman or mail carrier versus mailman). Some feminist theorists have reclaimed and redefined such words as "dyke" and "bitch".

=== Psychology ===
Feminist psychology is a form of psychology centered on societal structures and gender. Feminist psychology critiques the fact that historically psychological research has been done from a male perspective with the view that males are the norm. Feminist psychology is oriented on the values and principles of feminism. It incorporates gender and the ways women are affected by issues resulting from it.

One major psychological theory, relational-cultural theory, is based on the work of Jean Baker Miller, whose book Toward a New Psychology of Women proposes that "growth-fostering relationships are a central human necessity and that disconnections are the source of psychological problems". Inspired by Betty Friedan's Feminine Mystique, and other feminist classics from the 1960s, relational-cultural theory proposes that "isolation is one of the most damaging human experiences and is best treated by reconnecting with other people", and that a therapist should "foster an atmosphere of empathy and acceptance for the patient, even at the cost of the therapist's neutrality". The theory is based on clinical observations and sought to prove that "there was nothing wrong with women, but rather with the way modern culture viewed them".

==== Psychoanalysis ====
Psychoanalytic feminism and feminist psychoanalysis are based on Freud and his psychoanalytic theories, but they also supply an important critique of it. It maintains that gender is not biological but is based on the psycho-sexual development of the individual, but also that sexual difference and gender are different notions. Psychoanalytical feminists believe that gender inequality comes from early childhood experiences, which lead men to believe themselves to be masculine, and women to believe themselves feminine. It is further maintained that gender leads to a social system that is dominated by males, which in turn influences the individual psycho-sexual development. As a solution it was suggested by some to avoid the gender-specific structuring of the society coeducation. From the last 30 years of the 20th century, the contemporary French psychoanalytical theories concerning the feminine, that refer to sexual difference rather than to gender, with psychoanalysts like Julia Kristeva, Maud Mannoni, Luce Irigaray, and Bracha Ettinger that invented the concept matrixial space and matrixial Feminist ethics, have largely influenced not only feminist theory but also the understanding of the subject in philosophy, art, aesthetics and ethics and the general field of psychoanalysis itself. These French psychoanalysts are mainly post-Lacanian. Other feminist psychoanalysts and feminist theorists whose contributions have enriched the field through an engagement with psychoanalysis are Jessica Benjamin, Jacqueline Rose, Ranjana Khanna, and Shoshana Felman.

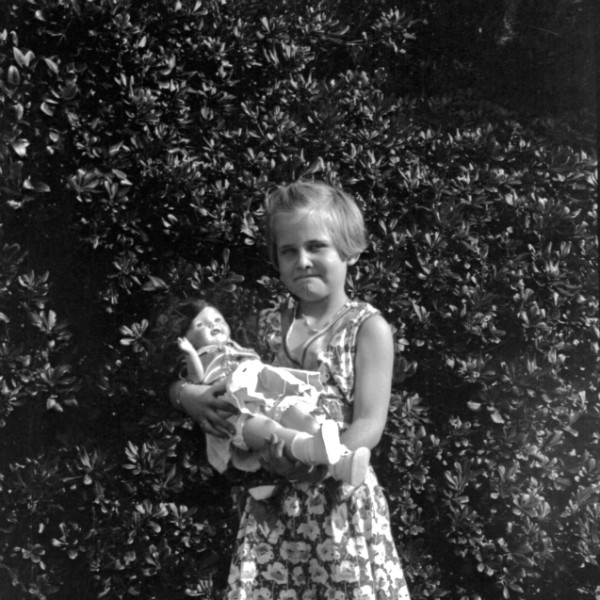
Girl with doll

=== Literary theory ===
Feminist literary criticism is literary criticism informed by feminist theories or politics. Its history has been varied, from classic works of female authors such as George Eliot, Virginia Woolf, and Margaret Fuller to recent theoretical work in women's studies and gender studies by "third-wave" authors.

In the most general terms, feminist literary criticism before the 1970s was concerned with the politics of women's authorship and the representation of women's condition within literature. Since the arrival of more complex conceptions of gender and subjectivity, feminist literary criticism has taken a variety of new routes. It has considered gender in the terms of Freudian and Lacanian psychoanalysis, as part of the deconstruction of existing power relations.

=== Film theory ===
Many feminist film critics, such as Laura Mulvey, have pointed to the "male gaze" that predominates in classical Hollywood film making. Through the use of various film techniques, such as shot reverse shot, the viewers are led to align themselves with the point of view of a male protagonist. Notably, women function as objects of this gaze far more often than as proxies for the spectator. Feminist film theory of the last twenty years is heavily influenced by the general transformation in the field of aesthetics, including the new options of articulating the gaze, offered by psychoanalytical French feminism, like Bracha Ettinger's feminine, maternal and matrixial gaze.

=== Art history ===
Linda Nochlin and Griselda Pollock are prominent art historians writing on contemporary and modern artists and articulating Art history from a feminist perspective since the 1970s. Pollock works with French psychoanalysis, and in particular with Kristeva's and Ettinger's theories, to offer new insights into art history and contemporary art with special regard to questions of trauma and trans-generation memory in the works of women artists. Other prominent feminist art historians include: Norma Broude and Mary Garrard; Amelia Jones; Mieke Bal; Carol Duncan; Lynda Nead; Lisa Tickner; Tamar Garb; Hilary Robinson; Katy Deepwell.

=== History ===
Feminist history refers to the re-reading and re-interpretation of history from a feminist perspective. It is not the same as the history of feminism, which outlines the origins and evolution of the feminist movement. It also differs from women's history, which focuses on the role of women in historical events. The goal of feminist history is to explore and illuminate the female viewpoint of history through rediscovery of female writers, artists, philosophers, etc., in order to recover and demonstrate the significance of women's voices and choices in the past.

=== Geography ===
Feminist geography is often considered part of a broader postmodern approach to the subject which is not primarily concerned with the development of conceptual theory in itself but rather focuses on the real experiences of individuals and groups in their own localities, upon the geographies that they live in within their own communities. In addition to its analysis of the real world, it also critiques existing geographical and social studies, arguing that academic traditions are delineated by patriarchy, and that contemporary studies which do not confront the nature of previous work reinforce the male bias of academic study.

=== Philosophy ===
The Feminist philosophy refers to a philosophy approached from a feminist perspective. Feminist philosophy involves attempts to use methods of philosophy to further the cause of the feminist movements, it also tries to criticize and/or reevaluate the ideas of traditional philosophy from within a feminist view. This critique stems from the dichotomy Western philosophy has conjectured with the mind and body phenomena. There is no specific school for feminist philosophy like there has been in regard to other theories. This means that Feminist philosophers can be found in the analytic and continental traditions, and the different viewpoints taken on philosophical issues with those traditions. Feminist philosophers also have many different viewpoints taken on philosophical issues within those traditions. Feminist philosophers who are feminists can belong to many different varieties of feminism. The writings of Judith Butler, Rosi Braidotti, Donna Haraway, Bracha Ettinger and Avital Ronell are the most significant psychoanalytically informed influences on contemporary feminist philosophy.

=== Sexology ===
Feminist sexology is an offshoot of traditional studies of sexology that focuses on the intersectionality of sex and gender in relation to the sexual lives of women. Feminist sexology shares many principles with the wider field of sexology; in particular, it does not try to prescribe a certain path or "normality" for women's sexuality, but only observe and note the different and varied ways in which women express their sexuality. Looking at sexuality from a feminist point of view creates connections between the different aspects of a person's sexual life.

From feminists' perspectives, sexology, which is the study of human sexuality and sexual relationship, relates to the intersectionality of gender, race and sexuality. Men have dominant power and control over women in the relationship, and women are expected to hide their true feeling about sexual behaviors. Women of color face even more sexual violence in the society. Some countries in Africa and Asia even practice female genital cutting, controlling women's sexual desire and limiting their sexual behavior. Moreover, Bunch, the women's and human rights activist, states that society used to see lesbianism as a threat to male supremacy and to the political relationships between men and women. Therefore, in the past, people viewed being a lesbian as a sin and made it death penalty. Even today, many people still discriminate homosexuals. Many lesbians hide their sexuality and face even more sexual oppression.

=== Monosexual paradigm ===
Monosexual Paradigm is a term coined by Blasingame, a self-identified African American, bisexual female. Blasingame used this term to address the lesbian and gay communities who turned a blind eye to the dichotomy that oppressed bisexuals from both heterosexual and homosexual communities. This oppression negatively affects the gay and lesbian communities more so than the heterosexual community due to its contradictory exclusiveness of bisexuals. Blasingame argued that in reality dichotomies are inaccurate to the representation of individuals because nothing is truly black or white, straight or gay. Her main argument is that biphobia is the central message of two roots; internalized heterosexism and racism. Internalized heterosexism is described in the monosexual paradigm in which the binary states that you are either straight or gay and nothing in between. Gays and lesbians accept this internalized heterosexism by morphing into the monosexial paradigm and favoring single attraction and opposing attraction for both sexes. Blasingame described this favoritism as an act of horizontal hostility, where oppressed groups fight amongst themselves. Racism is described in the monosexual paradigm as a dichotomy where individuals are either black or white, again nothing in between. The issue of racism comes into fruition in regards to the bisexuals coming out process, where risks of coming out vary on a basis of anticipated community reaction and also in regards to the norms among bisexual leadership, where class status and race factor predominately over sexual orientation.

=== Politics ===
Feminist political theory is a recently emerging field in political science focusing on gender and feminist themes within the state, institutions and policies. It questions the "modern political theory, dominated by universalistic liberalist thought, which claims indifference to gender or other identity differences and has therefore taken its time to open up to such concerns".

Feminist perspectives entered international relations in the late 1980s, at about the same time as the end of the Cold War. This time was not a coincidence because the last forty years the conflict between US and USSR had been the dominant agenda of international politics. After the Cold War, there was continuing relative peace between the main powers. Soon, many new issues appeared on international relation's agenda. More attention was also paid to social movements. Indeed, in those times feminist approaches also used to depict the world politics. Feminists started to emphasize that while women have always been players in international system, their participation has frequently been associated with non-governmental settings such as social movements. However, they could also participate in inter-state decision-making process as men did. Until more recently, the role of women in international politics has been confined to being the wives of diplomats, nannies who go abroad to find work and support their family, or sex workers trafficked across international boundaries. Women's contributions has not been seen in the areas where hard power plays significant role such as military. Nowadays, women are gaining momentum in the sphere of international relations in areas of government, diplomacy, academia, etc.. Despite barriers to more senior roles, women currently hold 11.1 percent of the seats in the U.S. Senate Foreign Relations Committee, and 10.8 percent in the House. In the U.S. Department of State, women make up 29 percent of the chiefs of mission, and 29 percent of senior foreign positions at USAID. In contrast, women are profoundly impacted by decisions the statepersons make.

=== Economics ===
Feminist economics broadly refers to a developing branch of economics that applies feminist insights and critiques to economics. However, in recent decades, feminists like for example Katrine Marçal, author of Who Cooked Adam Smith's Dinner? has also taken up a critique of economics. Research in feminist economics is often interdisciplinary, critical, or heterodox. It encompasses debates about the relationship between feminism and economics on many levels: from applying mainstream economic methods to under-researched "women's" areas, to questioning how mainstream economics values the reproductive sector, to deeply philosophical critiques of economic epistemology and methodology.

One prominent issue that feminist economists investigate is how the gross domestic product (GDP) does not adequately measure unpaid labor predominantly performed by women, such as housework, childcare, and eldercare. Feminist economists have also challenged and exposed the rhetorical approach of mainstream economics. They have made critiques of many basic assumptions of mainstream economics, including the Homo economicus model. In the Houseworker's Handbook Betsy Warrior presents a cogent argument that the reproduction and domestic labor of women form the foundation of economic survival; although, unremunerated and not included in the GDP. According to Warrior:

Economics, as it's presented today, lacks any basis in reality as it leaves out the very foundation of economic life. That foundation is built on women's labor; first her reproductive labor which produces every new laborer (and the first commodity, which is mother's milk and which nurtures every new "consumer/laborer"); secondly, women's labor composed of cleaning, cooking, negotiating social stability and nurturing, which prepares for market and maintains each laborer. This constitutes women's continuing industry enabling laborers to occupy every position in the work force. Without this fundamental labor and commodity there would be no economic activity.

Warrior also notes that the unacknowledged income of men from illegal activities like arms, drugs and human trafficking, political graft, religious emoluments and various other undisclosed activities provide a rich revenue stream to men, which further invalidates GDP figures. Even in underground economies where women predominate numerically, like trafficking in humans, prostitution and domestic servitude, only a tiny fraction of the pimp's revenue filters down to the women and children he deploys. Usually the amount spent on them is merely for the maintenance of their lives and, in the case of those prostituted, some money may be spent on clothing and such accouterments as will make them more salable to the pimp's clients. For instance, focusing on just the U.S., according to a government sponsored report by the Urban Institute in 2014, "A street prostitute in Dallas may make as little as $5 per sex act. But pimps can take in $33,000 a week in Atlanta, where the sex business brings in an estimated $290 million per year."

Proponents of this theory have been instrumental in creating alternative models, such as the capability approach and incorporating gender into the analysis of economic data to affect policy. Marilyn Power suggests that feminist economic methodology can be broken down into five categories.

=== Legal theory ===
Feminist legal theory is based on the feminist view that law's treatment of women in relation to men has not been equal or fair. The goals of feminist legal theory, as defined by leading theorist Clare Dalton, consist of understanding and exploring the female experience, figuring out if law and institutions oppose females, and figuring out what changes can be committed to. This is to be accomplished through studying the connections between the law and gender as well as applying feminist analysis to concrete areas of law.

Feminist legal theory stems from the inadequacy of the current structure to account for discrimination women face, especially discrimination based on multiple, intersecting identities. Kimberlé Crenshaw's work is central to feminist legal theory, particularly her article Demarginalizing the Intersection of Race and Sex: A Black Feminist Critique of Antidiscrimination Doctrine, Feminist Theory, and Antiracist Politics. DeGraffenreid v. General Motors is an example of such a case. In this instance, the court ruled the plaintiffs, five Black women including Emma DeGraffenreid, who were employees of General Motors, were not eligible to file a complaint on the grounds they, as black women, were not "a special class to be protected from discrimination". The ruling in DeGraffenreid against the plaintiff revealed the courts inability to understand intersectionality's role in discrimination. Moore v. Hughes Helicopters, Inc. is another ruling, which serves to reify the persistent discrediting of intersectionality as a factor in discrimination. In the case of Moore, the plaintiff brought forth statistical evidence revealing a disparity in promotions to upper-level and supervisory jobs between men and women and, to a lesser extent, between Black and white men. Ultimately, the court denied the plaintiff the ability to represent all Blacks and all females. The decision dwindled the pool of statistical information the plaintiff could pull from and limited the evidence only to that of Black women, which is a ruling in direct contradiction to DeGraffenreid. Further, because the plaintiff originally claimed discrimination as a Black female rather than, more generally, as a female the court stated it had concerns whether the plaintiff could "adequately represent white female employees". Payne v. Travenol serves as yet another example of the courts inconsistency when dealing with issues revolving around intersections of race and sex. The plaintiffs in Payne, two Black females, filed suit against Travenol on behalf of both Black men and women on the grounds the pharmaceutical plant practiced racial discrimination. The court ruled the plaintiffs could not adequately represent Black males; however, they did allow the admittance of statistical evidence, which was inclusive of all Black employees. Despite the more favorable outcome after it was found there was extensive racial discrimination, the courts decided the benefits of the ruling – back pay and constructive seniority – would not be extended to Black males employed by the company. Moore contends Black women cannot adequately represent white women on issues of sex discrimination, Payne suggests Black women cannot adequately represent Black men on issues of race discrimination, and DeGraffenreid argues Black women are not a special class to be protected. The rulings, when connected, display a deep-rooted problem in regards to addressing discrimination within the legal system. These cases, although they are outdated are used by feminists as evidence of their ideas and principles.

=== Communication theory ===
Feminist communication theory has evolved over time and branches out in many directions. Early theories focused on the way that gender influenced communication and many argued that language was "man made". This view of communication promoted a "deficiency model" asserting that characteristics of speech associated with women were negative and that men "set the standard for competent interpersonal communication", which influences the type of language used by men and women. These early theories also suggested that ethnicity, cultural and economic backgrounds also needed to be addressed. They looked at how gender intersects with other identity constructs, such as class, race, and sexuality. Feminist theorists, especially those considered to be liberal feminists, began looking at issues of equality in education and employment. Other theorists addressed political oratory and public discourse. The recovery project brought to light many women orators who had been "erased or ignored as significant contributors". Feminist communication theorists also addressed how women were represented in the media and how the media "communicated ideology about women, gender, and feminism".

Feminist communication theory also encompasses access to the public sphere, whose voices are heard in that sphere, and the ways in which the field of communication studies has limited what is regarded as essential to public discourse. The recognition of a full history of women orators overlooked and disregarded by the field has effectively become an undertaking of recovery, as it establishes and honors the existence of women in history and lauds the communication by these historically significant contributors. This recovery effort, begun by Andrea Lunsford, Professor of English and Director of the Program in Writing and Rhetoric at Stanford University and followed by other feminist communication theorists also names women such as Aspasia, Diotima, and Christine de Pisan, who were likely influential in rhetorical and communication traditions in classical and medieval times, but who have been negated as serious contributors to the traditions.

Feminist communication theorists are also concerned with a recovery effort in attempting to explain the methods used by those with power to prohibit women like Maria W. Stewart, Sarah Moore Grimké, and Angelina Grimké, and more recently, Ella Baker and Anita Hill, from achieving a voice in political discourse and consequently being driven from the public sphere. Theorists in this vein are also interested in the unique and significant techniques of communication employed by these women and others like them to surmount some of the oppression they experienced.

Feminist theorist also evaluate communication expectations for students and women in the work place, in particular how the performance of feminine versus masculine styles of communicating are constructed. Judith Butler, who coined the term "gender performativity" further suggests that, "theories of communication must explain the ways individuals negotiate, resist, and transcend their identities in a highly gendered society". This focus also includes the ways women are constrained or "disciplined" in the discipline of communication in itself, in terms of biases in research styles and the "silencing" of feminist scholarship and theory.

Who is responsible for deciding what is considered important public discourse is also put into question by feminist theorists in communication scholarship. This lens of feminist communication theory is labeled as revalorist theory which honors the historical perspective of women in communication in an attempt to recover voices that have been historically neglected. There have been many attempts to explain the lack of representative voices in the public sphere for women including, the notion that, "the public sphere is built on essentialist principles that prevent women from being seen as legitimate communicators in that sphere", and theories of subalternity", which, "under extreme conditions of oppression...prevent those in positions of power from even hearing their communicative attempts".

=== Public relations ===
Feminist theory can be applied to the field of public relations. The feminist scholar Linda Hon examined the major obstacles that women in the field experienced. Some common barriers included male dominance and gender stereotypes. Hon shifted the feminist theory of PR from "women's assimilation into patriarchal systems " to "genuine commitment to social restructuring". Similarly to the studies Hon conducted, Elizabeth Lance Toth studied Feminist Values in Public Relations. Toth concluded that there is a clear link between feminist gender and feminist value. These values include honesty, sensitivity, perceptiveness, fairness, and commitment.

=== Design ===
Technical writers have concluded that visual language can convey facts and ideas clearer than almost any other means of communication. According to the feminist theory, "gender may be a factor in how human beings represent reality."

Men and women will construct different types of structures about the self, and, consequently, their thought processes may diverge in content and form. This division depends on the self-concept, which is an "important regulator of thoughts, feelings and actions" that "governs one's perception of reality".

With that being said, the self-concept has a significant effect on how men and women represent reality in different ways.

Recently, "technical communicators' terms such as 'visual rhetoric,' 'visual language,' and 'document design' indicate a new awareness of the importance of visual design".

Deborah S. Bosley explores this new concept of the "feminist theory of design" by conducting a study on a collection of undergraduate males and females who were asked to illustrate a visual, on paper, given to them in a text. Based on this study, she creates a "feminist theory of design" and connects it to technical communicators.

In the results of the study, males used more angular illustrations, such as squares, rectangles and arrows, which are interpreted as a "direction" moving away from or a moving toward, thus suggesting more aggressive positions than rounded shapes, showing masculinity.

Females, on the other hand, used more curved visuals, such as circles, rounded containers and bending pipes. Bosley takes into account that feminist theory offers insight into the relationship between females and circles or rounded objects. According to Bosley, studies of women and leadership indicate a preference for nonhierarchical work patterns (preferring a communication "web" rather than a communication "ladder"). Bosley explains that circles and other rounded shapes, which women chose to draw, are nonhierarchical and often used to represent inclusive, communal relationships, confirming her results that women's visual designs do have an effect on their means of communications.

Based on these conclusions, this "feminist theory of design" can go on to say that gender does play a role in how humans represent reality.

=== Black feminist criminology ===
Black feminist criminology theory is a concept created by Hillary Potter in 2006 to act as a bridge that integrates Feminist theory with criminology. It is based on the integration of Black feminist theory and critical race feminist theory.

As Potter articulates this theory, Black feminist criminology describes experiences of Black women as victims of crimes. Other scholars, such as Patrina Duhaney and Geniece Crawford Mondé, have explored Black feminist criminology in relation to current and formerly incarcerated Black women.

For years, Black women were historically overlooked and disregarded in the study of crime and criminology; however, with a new focus on Black feminism that sparked in the 1980s, Black feminists began to contextualize their unique experiences and examine why the general status of Black women in the criminal justice system was lacking in female specific approaches. Potter explains that because Black women usually have "limited access to adequate education and employment as consequences of racism, sexism, and classism", they are often disadvantaged. This disadvantage materializes into "poor responses by social service professionals and crime-processing agents to Black women's interpersonal victimization".

Most crime studies focused on White males/females and Black males. Any results or conclusions targeted to Black males were usually assumed to be the same situation for Black females. This was very problematic since Black males and Black females differ in what they experience. For instance, economic deprivation, status equality between the sexes, distinctive socialization patterns, racism, and sexism should all be taken into account between Black males and Black females. The two will experience all of these factors differently; therefore, it was crucial to resolve this dilemma.

Black feminist criminology is proposed as the solution to this problem. It takes four factors into account:

- The social structural oppression of Black women (such as through the lens of Crenshaw's intersectionality).
- Nuances of Black communities and cultures.
- Black intimate and familial relations.
- The Black woman as an individual.

These four factors, Potter argues, helps Black feminist criminology describe the differences between Black women's and Black men's experiences within the criminal justice system. Still, Potter urges caution, noting that, just because this theory aims to help understand and explain Black women's experiences with the criminal justice system, one cannot generalize so much that nuances in experiences are ignored. Potter writes that Black women's "individual circumstances must always be considered in conjunction with the shared experiences of these women."

=== Feminist science and technology studies ===
Feminist science and technology studies (STS) refers to the transdisciplinary field of research on the ways gender and other markers of identity intersect with technology, science, and culture. The practice emerged from feminist critique on the masculine-coded uses of technology in the fields of natural, medical, and technical sciences, and its entanglement in gender and identity. A large part of feminist technoscience theory explains science and technologies to be linked and should be held accountable for the social and cultural developments resulting from both fields.

Some key issues feminist technoscience studies address include:

- The use of feminist analysis when applied to scientific ideas and practices
- Intersections between race, class, gender, science, and technology
- The implications of situated knowledges
- Politics of gender on how to understand agency, body, rationality, and the boundaries between nature and culture

=== Ecological feminism or ecofeminism ===
In the 1970s, the impacts of post-World War II technological development led many women to organise against issues from the toxic pollution of neighbourhoods to nuclear weapons testing on indigenous lands. This grassroots activism emerging across every continent was both intersectional and cross-cultural in its struggle to protect the conditions for reproduction of Life on Earth. Known as ecofeminism, the political relevance of this movement continues to expand. Classic statements in its literature include Carolyn Merchant, United States, The Death of Nature; Maria Mies, Germany, Patriarchy and Accumulation on a World Scale; Vandana Shiva, India, Staying Alive: Women Ecology and Development; Ariel Salleh, Australia, Ecofeminism as Politics: nature, Marx, and the postmodern. Ecofeminism involves a profound critique of Eurocentric epistemology, science, economics, and culture. It is increasingly prominent as a feminist response to the contemporary breakdown of the planetary ecosystem.

=== Girls studies and boys studies ===
Feminist scholars have applied critical frameworks around the categories of gender and sexuality to the study of childhood and youth, and specifically in the sub-disciplines of girls studies and boys studies. Girls studies has considered issues around representations of girls and girlhood across popular culture, education, psychology, health, and sexuality (among others), and has been influenced by the development of journals such as Girlhood Studies and the publication of books such as Catherine Driscoll's Girls (2002). Boys studies has emerged more recently, influenced by both girls studies and the study of masculinity within men's studies, and has been particularly visible in the study of education policy and curriculum development. Girls studies and boys studies are also connected from a feminist perspective. Driscoll et al. argue that 'There may be no conception of boyhood today that remains entirely untouched by feminism: the ideas about boys and boyhood that receive so much public speculation and policy development today are informed by long histories of feminist thought, including feminist interrogations of boyhood and girlhood.'

== See also ==
- Anarcha-feminism
- Antifeminism
- Atheist feminism
- Chicana feminism
- Christian feminism
- Conflict theories
- Conservative feminism
- Cultural feminism
- Difference feminism
- Equality feminism
- Feminism and modern architecture
- Fat feminism
- Feminist anthropology
- Feminist sociology
- First-wave feminism
- Fourth-wave feminism
- French feminism
- Gender equality
- Global feminism
- Hermeneutics of feminism in Islam
- Hip-hop feminism
- Indigenous feminism
- Individualist feminism
- Islamic feminism
- Jewish feminism
- Lesbian feminism
- Lipstick feminism
- Liberal feminism
- Material feminism
- Marxist feminism
- Networked feminism
- Neofeminism
- New feminism
- Postcolonial feminism
- Postmodern feminism
- Post-structural feminism
- Pro-feminism
- Pro-life feminism
- Radical feminism
- Rape culture
- Separatist feminism
- Second-wave feminism
- Sex-positive feminism
- Sikh feminism
- Socialist feminism
- Standpoint feminism
- State feminism
- Structuralist feminism
- Third-wave feminism
- Transfeminism
- Transnational feminism
