= Judy Seigel =

American artist, photographer, and activist (1930–2017)

- Judy Seigel, painting, c.1950s
- Born: Judith Lee Aronson; July 20, 1930; New York City, US
- Died: May 10, 2017 (aged 86)
- Education: BFA, Cooper Union,1954; Graduate studies in photography, Pratt Institute, 1980
- Website: judyseigel.com

Judy Seigel (1930–2017) was an American painter and photographer, writer and editor, and feminist activist in New York City. She began her career as an award-winning graphic artist at an ad agency, and a free-lance illustrator. Her impressionistic paintings resembled experimental photographs, and she became a photographer while photographing political t-shirts for her first book.

Called "a legend in alternative photographic processes" by Christopher James, Seigel taught photography at the Pratt Institute for fourteen years.

Seigel was the founding editor of both Women Artists News and The World Journal of Post-Factory Photography. She also published two books: Mutiny and the Mainstream (1992), and [Read My T-Shirt] for President... A True History of the Political Front – and Back (2005), and provided illustrations for a third, Sight Lines (1998).

Seigel was an activist for the preservation of her neighborhood, Greenwich Village. She was also an advocate of women's art, and a prolific writer of letters to the editors of The New York Times, The Villager, and Newsday.

== Early life and education ==
The daughter of Hortense and Gershon Aronson, Judith Lee Aronson was born in Brooklyn, New York City, on July 20, 1930. Her family moved to Scarsdale, where she graduated from high school in 1947. She went to Northwestern University and the Art Institute of Chicago, and met Morton Seigel in 1947. They married on December 25, 1951.

Judy Seigel graduated from Cooper Union in 1954, with Bachelor of Fine Arts retroactively bestowed in 1978, after the School of Art was accredited to offer degrees.

== Career ==
Seigel lived most of her life in New York City, where she worked as an advertising firm illustrator and painter. Eventually she also became a photographer, writer, editor, and feminist activist.

Entering the world of New York advertising, Seigel was a graphic artist, working as a staff illustrator at a New York ad agency, then free-lancing children's books. Known for her experimental techniques, she earned places in three annual awards of the field: the Graphis Annual (The International Annual of Advertising and Editorial Graphics), the Society of Illustrators Annual Exhibition, and the Art Directors Club Award.

From 1959 to early 1965, the Seigels moved to Switzerland where Morton earned a medical degree. There, Judy worked as a freelance illustrator to support Morton and their two children. Publisher Cynthia Navaretta described Seigel's dissatisfaction, "carrying out other people's ideas, as well as the loss of quality in reproduction", and her commitment to make "art she deeply cared about". In Europe, Seigel began painting oil landscapes in impressionistic style. As soon as family finances allowed on their return to the United States, Seigel was painting full time.

After a Fauvish period painting cityscapes, Seigel began using acrylics in abstract and pattern-based ways that were sometimes mistaken for large scale experimental photographs. She made note of a 1968 exhibit at the Museum of Modern Art, "Photography into Printmaking", that demonstrated solarizing and infrared photography, with effects resembling some of her painting techniques. Ten years later, she became interested in photography to document the street literature appearing on T-shirts, shooting some 1,600 "T-shirts of 1978" images, which she printed in a basement darkroom originally set up by her son.

== Photography ==
2004 self-portrait of Judy Seigel, photographer.

In 1980, Seigel took graduate studies in photography at the Pratt Institute. Christopher James called Seigel, "a legend in the elucidation of the alternative process arts", and Christina Anderson said she was "a leading expert in the field". Seigel taught photography at Pratt for fourteen years.

Seigel's sub-basement darkroom was one of four darkrooms described by Modern Photography in 1988: "Seigel's darkroom may look like a dungeon, but it does the job. Much of the furniture comes from fleamarkets and throw-aways. To accommodate the height of her Omega C23 enlarger, Seigel had a hole made in the ceiling." Seigel's printing process was described as working down one wall, with trays beside the enlarger for different strengths of developer. An under-counter tray served as an emergency counter, and opposite the enlarger was a table with a glass surface and a light for solarizing.

The Museum of Modern Art purchased a Seigel gelatin silver process print (toned), titled Pigeons, Village Square, 1980. Seigel's print, Delacorte Fountain, East River (NYC), 1983–1991, is displayed on artnet.com. More of her artwork is included in a posthumous tribute published on The Forward.

Seigel's 1977 solo painting exhibit at the Ward Nasse Gallery and 1985 Metal and Paint photo show at the Port Washington Library drew favorable commentaries. Her Mixed Media Gum Bichromate "Cop Yawning, Halloween" won the 2026 juror's award for the national "Analog-Made by Hand" exhibition at the Photo Place Gallery, Middlebury, VT.

Of Metal and Paint, Malcom Preston wrote that Seigel herself called her work "a hybrid between painting and photography". He noted that Seigel had used multiple techniques, including the Sabattier process, exposing a print to light during development: "...it is the solarization that compels our eye... there are some fascinating accidental effects". He wrote, "...painted additions — coupled with the often eerie certainly exciting colors that flee across the print surface with a marvelous iridescence — create some delicious visual pleasures". He concluded, "There is the immediacy of the photographic image and the sensuousness of the painterly-like surface. These are unusual prints. See them!"

Kathleen Paradiso wrote, "Judy Seigel's recent photos have a lyrical quality, salted with technique, and just a pinch of camp." Paradiso described Seigel, as "...hooked on darkroom experimentation, who took scrupulous notes, but could never quite control, or recreate, her discoveries", using beakers and a triple beam balance like a scientist. Paradiso also mentioned a Popular Photography review of Metal and Paint by Natalie Canavor, who had written, "Here's proof that photography's recognized boundaries have expanded sufficiently to obviate further debate about 'is it or isn't it photography.' " Paradiso concluded, "Metal and Paint is something new."

== Writing, editing and publishing ==
Seigel was the founding editor of Women Artists Newsletter, which became Women Artists News (1975–1992). Gwen Allen quoted arts critic Cynthia Navaretta: "The magazine functioned as 'an information exchange for artists' and 'a vehicle for artists to talk about art—[we] see ourselves as an advocate and voice for artists, and specifically women artists." Allen added that Women Artists Newsletter published reviews that covered topics "such as sexism in the art world, and balancing work and motherhood". The magazine had a circulation of 6,000 to 7,000, and 10,000 at one point.

Seigel also founded, edited, and published The World Journal of Post-Factory Photography (1998–2004). Reviewer Ed Buffalo wrote, "Post-Factory Photography is certainly the best underground do-it-yourself alternative-process photography magazine on the planet, containing no end of arcane information. The magazine quickly becomes an indispensable reference for anyone interested in alternative processes." Reviewer Jodi Allen said, "As the factory-made materials of modern photography fade from view, hand-applied media, new and old, take the field. The World Journal of Post-Factory Photography brings you 48 pages of information, inspiration, and news about this world-wide movement, from facts and formulas to personalities and history."

Sil Horowitz reported in the PSA Journal that The World Journal of Post-Factory Photography was a new periodical about "alternative photography", noting that soon all chemical-based media may become "alternative". He listed articles on "Gum Control – an Introduction", as well as "basic gum bichromate (excellently explained and illustrated), a comparison of Van Dyke brown formulas, a piece on 'Drawing on the Right Side of the Computer', ...book reviews, a comprehensive examination of 'Sense & Sensitometry,' and several pages listing sources of materials required for alternative photography".

Seigel's two books were also favorably reviewed. Ann Lee Morgan described Mutiny and the Mainstream as Talk That Changed Art, 1975–1992 as a "way to get inside of artists' heads... Sophistication, intelligence, pretense, honesty, ambition, elegance, paranoia, professionalism, humor, and anger all bubble along here in a great stew, the stock of which is devotion to art..."

[Read My T-Shirt] for President... A True History of the Political Front – and Back, consisted of photographs of "people in T-shirts with different texts, concentrating on political messages after taking part in the protests at the 2004 Republican National Convention". The book returned to the subject that first interested Seigel in photography nearly twenty years earlier – "the street literature" breaking out in slogans on T-shirts in the 1970s. The Villager review described it as, "a retrospective of political T-shirts and their significance in society", with the T-shirts pictured in the book as ranging from, "witty to profound to obscene".

== Activism ==
=== Art and feminism ===
Some of Seigel's activism took the form of letters to the editors of New York newspapers. For example, she disputed the claim that selling art on the streets was a constitutional matter. Seigel called it "schlock as free speech" and "the right to clog streets".

Seigel wrote about the obscenity of the ways women are portrayed. She published an essay in Women Artist News critical of the University of Arizona's offering for sale some prints of nude photographs of women: "It's hardly news that a large and lucrative market exists for material of this type. It is news when an institution of higher learning moves to cash in on it." Seigel also sent letters to the editors of The Villager critical of Don Imus, who "still thinks it's 'fun' and 'cool' to call women 'hos' ...We can't necessarily blame Imus for being a moron, but we can blame his enablers, who are the real 'hos' ".

Critical of The New York Times article about a female professor's objection to Goya's Naked Maja being shown in the classroom, Seigel rebutted the interpretation that the objection was about "simply the arousal of male fantasy". Rather, it was about "the stereotype of woman as whore". She added, "In the case of the Maja, whether or not the lady is a whore, she's naked female flesh on the wall, one of a long line of naked women in a culture in which, whatever movies show us, people in power still wear clothes."

Seigel objected to a New York Times story on Senator D'Mato's opposition to Medicaid payments for abortions: "No amount of good Senator D'Amato might do could compensate for the damage of forced child bearing, particularly, if one can imagine it, after rape or incest, particularly for those at the level of Medicaid eligibility."

=== Community activism ===
The Villager reported that Seigel was "a passionate advocate for the preservation of Greenwich Village", whose "relentless neighborhood advocacy and artistic endeavors were chronicled in The Villager". Her letters to the editor also advocated waterfront preservation.

In 1992, Seigel wrote, "We in the Village failed to stop the Port Authority from breaking environmental protection laws and city codes when it erected two ventilation towers at the end of Morton Street." She described the structures as "ill-conceived, badly engineered and unnecessary (as independent consultants proved, to the concern of no one in city government)".

For a decade beginning in 2004, Seigel led neighbors, protesting "...against what they believe is illegal commercial use of property... [which] she calls 'Hollywood on the Hudson' and said that the traffic, trailers, set lights, noise, cranes and parking issues associated with activity... cause a serious disruption to her and surrounding residents". Seigel documented the problems, "with a camera, writing letters, staging protests, appealing to the Morton Street Block Association and... speaking at a Community Board 2 meeting".

Seigel and neighbors rallied to advocate keeping local post offices open in 2009.

Late in her life, Seigel experienced short-term memory loss, diagnosed in 2010 as related to Alzheimer's. She died in her sleep on May 19, 2017.

== Publications ==
=== Selected articles ===
- Seigel, Judy (Spring 1973). "Women's Panels at the C.A.A." The Feminist Art Journal. 2 (2): 10–11, 14. JSTOR community.28036283.
- Seigel, Judy (June 1986). "Let's play house?". Women Artists News. 11: 13–15. JSTOR community.28046843.
- Seigel, Judy (Winter 1987). "Guest Editorial: Synthetic Color in Photography" (PDF). Exposure. 25 (4): 5–6.
- Seigel, Judy (Fall 1987). "Beatrice Wood". Women Artists News. 12 (4/5): 9–11. JSTOR community.28046849.
- Seigel, Judy (December 1991). "Dress for Duress". Women Artists News. 16/17: 74 – via EBSCO.
- Seigel, Judy (Spring 1993). "The Nipple Effect". Women Artists News Book Review. 18: 12–34 – via EBSCO.
- Seigel, Judy (Spring 1994). "Art and Psychoanalysis/the Cult of the Avant-Garde Artist". Women Artists News Book Review. 19: 3–36 – via EBSCO.

=== Books ===
- Seigel, Judy (1992). Mutiny and the Mainstream: Talk That Changed Art, 1975–1992. Midmarch Arts Press. ISBN 978-1877675058.
- Seigel, Judy (2006). [Read My T-Shirt] for President... A True History of the Political Front – and Back. Front and Back Press. ISBN 978-1877675607.
- Mandel, Charlotte (1998). Sight Lines. Illustrated with black and white photographs by Judy Seigel. Midmarch Arts Press. ISBN 978-1877675270.

== See also ==
- Feminist art criticism
- Feminist art movement in the United States
- Heresies: A Feminist Publication on Art and Politics
- List of feminist art magazines
- Spectral sensitivity
