= List of feminist art magazines =

A feminist art magazine is a publication whose main topic is feminist art or feminist art criticism. They can be in print form, online, or both. They may be aimed at different audiences, including academic institutions, galleries, buyers, amateur or professional artists and the general public. Feminist art magazines can be academic journals or consumer magazines.

Notable feminist art magazines include:

== Current ==
- Camera Obscura, est. 1976, triannual, Duke University Press
- Femspec, est. 1999, Cleveland, Ohio, interdisciplinary feminist fiction journal
- LTTR, est. 2001, annual, gender queer feminist art journal
- M/E/A/N/I/N/G, in print 1986 to 1996, now online
- Meridians: Feminism, Race, Transnationalism, est. 2000, Smith College, Northampton, Massachusetts, interdisciplinary peer-reviewed feminist journal
- n.paradoxa: international feminist art journal, est. 1996, biannual, covering feminist art criticism and the work of contemporary women artists
- Payam-e-Zan (Women's Message), 1981, Afghanistan, founded by Meena Keshwar Kamal
- Sinister Wisdom, est. 1976, triannual; the oldest surviving lesbian literary magazine
- tender, est. 2013, United Kingdom, online quarterly journal of literary art by female-identified writers
- Velvetpark, in print 2002 to 2007, now online
- Woman's Art Journal, biannual journal focused on women artists and issues related to women in the arts, Old City Publishing, Inc.
- Women & Performance: a journal of feminist theory, est. 1983, Department of Performance Studies at New York University’s Tisch School of the Arts, interdisciplinary journal of feminist performance theory
- Women's Art Register Bulletin, est. 1988, published by the Women's Art Register, Melbourne

== Not in publication ==
- Amazon Quarterly, feminist lesbian arts periodical, 1972 to 1975, United States
- At the Crossroads: A Journal for Women Artists of African Descent, 1992 to 1997, Toronto, Ontario, founded by Karen Miranda Augustine
- The Blatant Image: a Magazine of Feminist Photography, 1981 to 1983, Oregon
- Chrysalis, 1977 to 1980, Los Angeles
- The Creative Woman, 1977 to 1992, published by Governors State University
- FAN: feminist arts news, 1980 to 1993, Leeds, United Kingdom
- The Feminist Art Journal, 1972 to 1977, New York; the first stable, widely read journal of its kind
- Heresies: A Feminist Publication on Art and Politics, 1977–1992, New York
- Hot Flashes, 1993 to 1994, quarterly newsletter of the anonymous female artists group Guerrilla Girls
- Hue Points: Women's Caucus for Art Newsmagazine, 1982 to 1986, Phoenix, Arizona
- Hurricane Alice, 1983 to 1985, Minneapolis, Minneapolis
- Lip magazine, 1975–1983, Melbourne, Australia
- Makara, 1975 to 1978, Vancouver, British Columbia
- MAKE Magazine, 1983 to 2002; began as Women Artists Slide Library, then became Women's Art Magazine, before becoming MAKE
- Matriart, 1990 to 1998, Women's Art Resource Center, Toronto, Ontario
- Time and Tide, 1920 to 1986, London, United Kingdom
- Women Artists Newsletter/Women Artists News, established in 1978 and in print until January 1991; WAN was a feminist art newsletter based in New York City.
