= Elaine Kowalsky =

Canadian printmaker and artists' rights campaigner

Elaine Gloria Kowalsky
- Born: November 15, 1948; Winnipeg, Manitoba, Canada
- Died: September 17, 2005 (aged 56); London, England, United Kingdom
- Known for: Printmaker
- Spouse: Elton Bash (m. 1978)

Elaine Kowalsky (September 24, 1948 – September 17, 2005) was a Canadian printmaker and artists' rights campaigner. She lived and worked in the United Kingdom for over 30 years. Her prints and various other artworks are held in public collections around the world, including the Victoria and Albert Museum in London and the Smithsonian Institution in Washington.

== Early life and education ==
Elaine Gloria Kowalsky was born in Winnipeg, Manitoba in 1948, the daughter of Cliff and Rosemary Kowalsky. She had three brothers, Cliff, Barry and Ken. She grew up in Charleswood.

Kowalsky attended the School of Art at the University of Manitoba, majoring in Printmaking. Upon her graduation in 1971, she moved to London to further her artistic studies and her printmaking career. In 1973 she attended St. Martin's School of Art in London for a postgraduate printmaking course.

== Printmaking ==
She continued producing and exhibiting work and at the same time earned a Masters in Visual Theory, at the University of East London. At the time of her death, she was registered for a Master of Philosophy degree in Drawing at the Royal College of Art.

In 1977, she was instrumental in organizing an ACGB Studio Conversion Grant for the building of the artists co-operative North Star Studios, in Brighton. In 1982, she was the artist in residence, Lowick House Workshop, Cumbria. In 1987, she was named to the first Henry Moore Fellowship in Printmaking at the Leeds Polytechnic.

Kowalsky was a part of a number of exhibitions in Canada and the UK, including:

- Canadian Student Printmakers, Art Gallery of Nova Scotia, Halifax (1970)
- Islington Studios Group Show, Upper Street Gallery, London, England (1972)
- Canada House Gallery, London, England (1974)
- Specialist Printmaking Group, Gardener Centre Gallery, University of Sussex, Brighton, England (1975)
- Burnaby Print Biennale, Burnaby Art Gallery, Burnaby

== Later work ==
DACS named their gallery located in Clerkenwell, London the Kowalsky Gallery in her honour. Exhibitions, artist talks and performances seek to engage the audience and artists in exploration of the role of the artist in the contemporary world.

Elaine was the anonymous author of Diary of an Aging Art Slut published 1997–2004 in the journal n.paradoxa covering feminist art criticism and the work of women artists since the 1970s. The 22 installments from her diary were a witty contribution to n.paradoxa which expressed much of her energy, passions, social awareness and sense of humour.

== Copyright activism ==
Throughout her career, Elaine was instrumental in working towards full copyright protection for artists and their works. Noting a lack of regulation in the industry, she organized with fellow artists the Artlaw organization, which primarily sought to give copyright to artists' images and royalty payments upon resale of art. This organization evolved into the Design and Artists Copyright Society (DACS). Elaine was the chair of DACS for many years, and campaigned for legislative changes to give the copyright protection to artists that was afforded to other creative industry workers

== Personal life and death ==
Kowalsky married Elton Bash in 1978. She died in a car accident September 2005, shortly before the copyright legislation she helped to bring about came into effect in January 2006.

== Bibliography ==
- Hearts and Vessels: New Work by Elaine Kowalsky. (Leeds City Art Gallery, 1988)
- Kowalsky, Elaine. Larger Than Life: March 8-April 5, 1986 (Ikon Gallery, 1986)
- Art & Technology, War & the Body, Women's Art Magazine, volume 63 (Mar/Apr 95)
