= Betterton =

Betterton may refer to:

== Places ==
- Betterton, Maryland, a town in the United States
- Betterton, a hamlet within the parish of Lockinge in Oxfordshire, England

== People with the surname Betterton ==
- Henry Betterton, 1st Baron Rushcliffe (1872 – 1949), English barrister and Conservative politician
- Thomas Betterton (ca. 1635 – 1710), English actor
- Rosemary Betterton (born 1951), English feminist art historian
