= Women Artists News =

Women Artists News (vol. 1, no. 1-vol. 17) was a feminist magazine produced between 1975 and 1992 in New York City.

== History ==
Established in 1975, Women Artists Newsletter was published by Cynthia Navaretta, with founding editor Judy Seigel, under the Midmarch Associates imprint along with a staff of volunteer writers, photographers and graphic designers. Functioning as a space for information exchange and communication for and among a community of women artists, the newsletter published books reviews, articles, museum and gallery listings, event listings, interviews, how-to information, and other assorted news related to art, feminism and women's issues. With the January 1978 issue (vol. 3, no 7) the publication changed its name to Women Artists News, to account for the increasing page count and purview of the publication. Circulation remained around 6000-7000, at one point reaching a readership of 10,000. Contributors throughout the run of the publication included Isabel Case Borgatta, Joyce Kozloff, Lil Picard, Miriam Schapiro, Sylvia Sleigh, Joan Snyder, Nancy Spero and May Stevens, many of whom were also affiliated with the feminist collective and journal Heresies.

=== Cynthia Navaretta ===
Navaretta (1923 - 2020) was a founding member of the Women's Caucus for Art, the Coalition of Women's Arts Organizations, and Women in the Arts in 1972. In addition to founding Women Artists Newsletter, she also established Midmarch Arts Press, which published dozens of books including Navaretta's Guide to Women's Art Organizations and Directory for the Arts (Midmarch Arts Press, 1979). She has edited several volumes of women in the arts and maintains a major archive of women artists in the U.S. since the later 1960s. The archive, housed at the Smithsonian Archives of American Art, includes press releases, exhibition and events announcements, catalogs, posters, and newspaper clippings regarding women artists and organizations. Photographs are of women's organizations, events and artists and curators including Faith Ringgold, Susan Schwalb, Lowery Stokes Sims, Sari Dienes, Judy Seigel, Audrey Flack, and June Wayne, among others. Correspondence is between Navaretta and various women's art organizations.

== See also ==
- Feminist art movement in the United States
- List of feminist art magazines
- Feminist art criticism
- Heresies: A Feminist Publication on Art and Politics
