= Isabel Case Borgatta =

American sculptor (1921–2017)

- Born: Isabel Marie Case; November 21, 1921; Madison, Wisconsin
- Died: April 10, 2017 (aged 95); New York, New York
- Known for: Sculpture
- Spouse: Robert Borgatta
- Website: isabelcaseborgatta.com

Isabel Case Borgatta (November 21, 1921 - April 4, 2017) was an American sculptor.

== Life ==
Borgatta née Case was born on November 21, 1921, in Madison, Wisconsin. She attended Smith College and Yale University. She also studied with Jose de Creeft. She married fellow artist Robert Borgatta with whom she had three children.

Case was the recipient of MacDowell fellowships in 1968, 1973 and 1974. she was a founding member of the organization Women in the Arts and a contributor to Women Artists News, a 1970s feminist newsletter.

She died on April 10, 2017, at the Westbeth Artists Community in New York City. Her work is in the collection of the William Benton Museum of Art and the Krannert Art Museum, and The Frances Young Tang Teaching Museum and Art Gallery.
