= Faith Bromberg =

American painter

Faith Bromberg (1919– June 19, 1990) was an American painter active within the feminist art movement. Her work often featured figurative paintings in mixed mediums.

== Biography ==
Born in Los Angeles in 1919. Bromberg attended Sacramento City College, the University of California, Los Angeles, the Otis College of Art and Design, and the Los Angeles School of Fine Arts, and had lessons with Wayne Thiebaud and June Wayne. In 1980 she received a fellowship from the National Endowment for the Arts, and in 1975 and 1976 she won awards from the American Academy of Arts and Letters. She showed work in numerous exhibits, both solo and group, during her career. Active in feminist art groups as well, she contributed to The Feminist Art Journal and took an active role in Womanspace and Women's Caucus for Art, among others. Her paintings were often worked in oil and spray paint.
