= Marxism and the Oppression of Women =

1983 book by Lise Vogel

Marxism and the Oppression of Women: Toward a Unitary Theory
- Cover of the first edition
- Author: Lise Vogel
- Language: English
- Series: Historical Materialism Book Series
- Subject: Marxist feminism
- Publisher: Rutgers University Press
- Publication date: 1983
- Publication place: United States
- Media type: Print (Hardcover and Paperback)
- Pages: 231 (1987 edition); 266 (2014 edition)
- ISBN: 978-1-60846-340-4

Marxism and the Oppression of Women: Toward a Unitary Theory (1983; revised edition 2013) is a book by the sociologist Lise Vogel that is considered an important contribution to Marxist Feminism. Vogel surveys Karl Marx and Friedrich Engels's comments on the causes of women's oppression, examines how socialist movements in Europe and in the United States have addressed women's oppression, and argues that women's oppression should be understood in terms of women's role in social reproduction and in particular in reproducing labor power.

Vogel writes: "This book constitutes an argument for the power of Marxism to analyze the issues that face women today in their struggle for liberation. It strongly rejects, however, the assumption made by many socialists that the classical-Marxist tradition bequeaths a more or less complete analysis of the problem of women's oppression."

The book received mixed reviews at the time of publication in 1983 but is now considered a founding text of Social Reproduction Theory.

== Summary ==
She argues that Marx's views on women's issues are inadequately under-developed, but that they contain insights that are useful for struggles against female oppression within capitalist class society and the capitalist mode of production. She argues that Marx's work on individual consumption, the value of labour-power and the industrial reserve army, provided a useful basis for further work on the issue of social reproduction. In contrast, Vogel finds Engels' work defective because of its utopianism and its reliance on a dual system theory of women's oppression vs. class oppression. She acknowledges, however, that the work of Engels was very influential in socialist debates despite its theoretical weaknesses.

Vogel examines the socialist movement around the time of the Second International and the Russian Revolution in order to analyse what leading activists had to say. She critiques much of what was written as a conflation of utopianism, liberalism and dual systems theory. However, she does find that Vladimir Lenin's work and German SPD leader Clara Zetkin's work both represented much more pragmatic attempts to seriously address women's oppression and involvement in revolutionary activity.

Vogel outlines two contradictory tendencies in the socialist debate about women's oppression - one which uses a dual systems analysis and the other which is rooted in social reproduction. She argues in favour of the social reproduction approach and elaborates her own theory of women's oppression from that perspective.
