= Cindy Nemser =

American art historian and writer (1937–2021)

- Born: Cecile Heller; March 26, 1937; New York City, US
- Died: January 26, 2021 (aged 83)
- Education: Midwood High School; Brooklyn College; New York University
- Occupation: Art historian
- Notable work: Art Talk
- Spouse: Charles S. Nemser (m. 1956)
- Children: 1

Cindy Heller Nemser (born Cecile Heller, March 26, 1937 – January 26, 2021) was an American art historian and writer. Founder and editor of the Feminist Art Journal, she was an activist and prominent figure in the feminist art movement and was best known for her writing on the work of women artists such as Eva Hesse, Alice Neel, and Louise Nevelson.

== Early life ==
Nemser was born Cecile Heller in Brooklyn, New York, the daughter of William Heller and Helen (Nelson) Heller. After attending Midwood High School, she earned a B.A. in Education and—while teaching elementary school—an M.A. in English and American Literature from Brooklyn College. She then enrolled at the Institute of Fine Arts at New York University, where she received her M.A. in Art History in 1966. While at the Institute, Nemser wrote exhibition reviews for Arts Magazine alongside her studies. In 1956, she married Charles S. Nemser.

== Career ==
After completing an internship at the Museum of Modern Art, Nemser continued to be involved in the New York art scene in 1966 as a critic. Her articles covered contemporary realism, OP Art, body art, and other areas. She was the first critic to write about the work of several artists, including Chuck Close, Vito Acconci and Gordon Matta-Clark.

In 1972, Nemser was one of the founders of Women in the Arts, and was on the board of the collective which published the journal Woman and Art, along with Patricia Mainardi, Irene Peslikis, Irene Moss, Michele Wallace and Marjorie Kramer.

She was the publisher and editor of the Feminist Art Journal from 1972–1977, working with Patricia Mainardi for its first year of publication before continuing on as the FAJ's sole editor. By 1977 when Nemser closed the FAJ, it had been instrumental in securing positions for creative women, achieved worldwide readership, and reached major public and university libraries as well as many prominent artists, art critics and historians.

In 1973, Nemser organized three panels on women in the arts for the artists’ division of the College Art Association. In 1973–1974, she was instrumental in conceiving Philadelphia Focus on the Visual Arts, or FOCUS, a multi-venue exhibition series. She worked with Diane Burko to make the festival a reality.

In 1975 Nemser authored Art Talk: Conversations with 12 Women Artists, which included interviews with Barbara Hepworth, Sonia Delaunay, Louise Nevelson, Lee Krasner, Alice Neel, Grace Hartigan, Marisol, Eva Hesse, Lila Katzen, Eleanor Antin, Audrey Flack, and Nancy Grossman. A reprint published by Harper Collins in 1995 also included conversations with Betye Saar, Isabel Bishop, and Janet Fish. She published Ben Cunningham: A Life with Color in 1989 and the novel Eve’s Delight in 1982. Her numerous articles have appeared in publications including Artforum, Art in America, Arts Magazine, The New York Times, The Village Voice, Newsday, Ms. magazine, The Journal of Aesthetic Education, and Art Education.

In 1977, Nemser became an associate of the Women's Institute for Freedom of the Press (WIFP), an American nonprofit publishing organization that works to increase communication between women and connect the public with forms of women-based media.

In the 1990s Nemser became a theater critic, writing for publications such as Theater Guild Quarterly. Feminism continued to influence her work on the dramatic arts, and exposed how sexism that permeated the theater world.

At the time of her death from pneumonia in 2021, she was completing her memoir Firebrand: Tales of the 70's Art World Told by a Feminist Art Critic.

== Curating ==
Nemser was curator or co-curator of several exhibitions which celebrate female artists and feminist art:

- 1974 — "In Her Own Image" at the Fleisher Art Memorial Gallery of the Philadelphia Museum of Art
- 1974 — "FOCUS: Women’s Work — American Art in 1974" (with Marcia Tucker, Adele Breeskin, Anne d’Hanoncourt and sculptor Lila Katzen) at the Philadelphia Civic Center
- 2007 — "Women’s Work: Homage to Feminist Art" at the Tabla Rasa Gallery in Brooklyn

== Bibliography ==
- Nemser, Cindy (1975). Art Talk. Scribner. ISBN 0684139847.
- Nemser, Cindy (1989). Ben Cunningham: A Life with Color. Post, Texas: JPL Art Publishers.
- Van Wagner, Judith (August 15, 1984). Women Shaping Art. Praeger. ISBN 0275917525.
