= The Feminist Art Journal =

1972–1977 American magazine

- A 1977 edition: "Women in Pursuit of Success."
- Editor: Cindy Nemser
- Categories: Feminist art
- Frequency: Quarterly
- Format: Print
- Circulation: 8,000
- Publisher: Feminist Art Journal, Inc.
- Founder: Cindy Nemser
- Founded: April 1972
- Final issue: 1977
- Country: United States
- Based in: Brooklyn, New York
- Language: English
- ISSN: 0300-7014
- OCLC: 474102725

The Feminist Art Journal was an American magazine, published quarterly from 1972 to 1977. It was the first stable, widely read journal covering feminist art. By the time the final publication was produced, The Feminist Art Journal had a circulation of eight thousand copies, and ten thousand copies of the last edition were printed.

== History ==
Cindy Nemser, Patricia Mainardi, and Irene Moss, the three founding members of the Feminist Art Journal all formerly staffed the magazine Women and Art, a publication funded by the Redstocking Artists. That magazine had originally intended to cover topics surrounding the American feminist art movement, but only one issue was ever published due to internal discord. That magazine's successor was The Feminist Art Journal, which was founded in Brooklyn in 1972.

The journal had a three-part mission:

1) To be the voice of women artists in the art world;

2) To improve the status of all women artists; and

3) To expose sexist exploitation and discrimination.

In the same year the magazine was founded, Cindy Nemser became the sole editor of the journal, and, in 1975, her husband joined her as a co-editor. The majority of the articles written in The Feminist Art Journal were all authored by women, however. Some of the prominent contributors included Faith Ringgold, Marcia Tucker, Howardena Pindell, and Faith Bromberg.

In its five-year run, The Feminist Art Journal published interviews with breakthrough female artists, and included creative writing pieces and art historical essays to keep the content consistently diverse. Featured artists worked in all mediums, and over twenty historical profiles of female figures in art were published. The articles included both a positive modern review of the artist's work, as well as a biographical section which included why the artist was looked over.

The Feminist Art Journal was also used as a space where gender discrimination within the art world was called out. In the first two editions the magazine, a column called "Male Chauvinist Exposé" was featured in the journal. Both individual people and institutions, ranging from newspapers, to museums, to universities were denounced for sexist language and actions.

Over time, the publication's exposés became decreased as the journal focused more on living female artists, regularly conducting interviews that covered the artist's childhood, career, education, influences, gender role/career balance, and even any relationship with a male artist.

In 1975, in an attempt to appeal to a larger readership, Cindy Nemser changed the format of the journal from an ad-free tabloid style to an ad-inclusive journal. This change ultimately did not help the journal survive. The magazine folded in 1977 due to financial strain..

In an interview, Patricia Mainardi claimed that journals like The Feminist Art Journal saw their demise because they had reached their goals. More mainstream publications were pressured into paying attention to female artists after the gained success of publications like The Feminist Art Journal, so journals that were specifically devoted to female artists became devalued.

== Artists featured ==
- Janet Fish
- Natalia Goncharova
- Barbara Hepworth
- Harriet Hosmer
- Gertrude Käsebier
- Marie de Medici
- Joan Mitchell
- Yvonne Rainer
- Joyce Reopel
- Faith Ringgold

== See also ==
- Feminist Art Criticism
- Redstockings
