= Rosemary Betterton =

English writer

Rosemary Betterton (born 1951) is an English feminist art historian, writer, and educator. She is recognized for her work in the field of Contemporary Art, particularly her inquiries into women's art practices.

== Biography ==
Rosemary Betterton was born in 1951. She is British.

Betterton taught art history and critical studies at Sheffield Hallam University and served as a faculty member at University of Lancaster teaching in the areas of visual culture and feminist theory. She is Professor Emerita at Lancaster University.

Betterton is the author of many books and essays. Maternal Bodies in the Visual Arts analyzes images and texts to make the argument that pregnancy, in Western culture, is viewed and depicted with profound ambivalence by both feminists and non-feminists. Women, Artists and The Body presents a discussion of how twentieth century women have sought to understand and influence where they fit into Western culture and art.

== Selected publications ==
=== Books ===
- Maternal bodies in the visual arts (Manchester University Press, 2014)
- Unframed : practices and politics of women’s contemporary painting (Tauris, 2004)
- An intimate distance : women, artists, and the body (Routledge, 1996)
- Looking on : images of femininity in the visual arts and media. (Pandora Press, 1987)

=== Chapters ===
- Why is my art not as good as me? Femininity, feminism and “ Life-drawing” in Tracey Emin's artin The art of Tracey Emin, Edited by: Merck, M . and Townsend, C. 22–39. London: Thames & Hudson.
