= Robert Borgatta =

American artist (1921–2009)

Robert Edward Borgatta
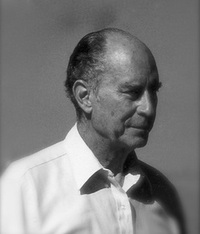
- Born: Roberto Eduardo Biagio Borgatta y Ruiz; January 11, 1921; Havana, Cuba
- Died: October 28, 2009 (aged 88); Miami Beach, Florida
- Education: NYU, Yale
- Known for: painter, sculptor
- Notable work: Painting, Sculpture, Photography
- Spouse: Isabel Casei
- Awards: Tiffany Fellowship 1942; Emily Lowe Foundation 1957; MacDowell Colony Fellowship 1972, 1973; Silvermine Guild 1954, 1958; Audubon Artist Annuals 1955, 1958, 1969; American Watercolor Society 1961, 1962; National Society Painters In Casein and Acrylic 1961, 1970
- Website: robertoborgatta.org

Roberto Eduardo Biagio Borgatta y Ruiz (1921–2009), known as Robert Edward Borgatta, was an American artist and nature painter whose style evolved from abstract to more representational work.

== Early life and education ==
Robert was born in Havana, Cuba and had a peripatetic childhood. His father, Carlos Borgatta, worked for Marconi Communications as a communications engineer, designing and installing telegraph systems throughout Latin America (Cuba, Brazil, Mexico and Argentina). Robert's father was of Northern Italian and Mexican Indian descent, fluent in both Spanish and Italian, and an Italian citizen. He worked with David Sarnoff at Marconi Communications; Sarnoff would later found RCA, and offer a Carlos a job prior to the outbreak of WWII when Italy became allied with Germany. He facilitated the visas for his immediate family to immigrate to the US from Italy when Robert was a teen.

Onorio Ruotolo of the Leonardo da Vinci Art School in New York recognized Robert's talents as a child painter, and accepted him as the youngest student in the school at nine years old. Robert travelled alone daily to the school via the elevated subway from Maspeth, Queens, and then back home nine hours later. Carlos located the school through his acquaintance with Ruotolo, also from northern Italy. The School emphasized traditional European art training, with extensive time spent drawing life size plaster casts of classical Greco Roman sculptures, and extensive instruction on human anatomy. Robert was trained as in the tradition of the Renaissance, where emphasis is first placed on drawing from classical Greek and Roman sculpture, before graduating to life model drawing and the study of perspective and then on to art history.

The School marked Robert's introduction to, and lifelong admiration of, Vesalius' anatomical drawings, and he would return to this reference book throughout his career, especially when sculpting. At the school, Robert developed a friendship with the sculptor Isamu Noguchi, and the two maintained contact for many years following. Noguchi had a long relationship with the School and, like Robert, was a favourite of Ruotolo. Also like Robert, Noguchi stood out from other teachers and students: he was Japanese American and the oldest teacher at the time, while Robert was the youngest student and still learning English. Noguchi enabled "Robbie" to attend the life drawing classes where subjects were nude models (Robert's young age was the reason he wasn't allowed in these classes—the older students found his advanced skill level upsetting). Robert attended life modelling classes throughout his career, and found the experience of life drawing an important resource in resolving technical issues when developing new works.

In 1931 at the age of eleven, Robert was a recipient of a Wannamaker Prize bestowed upon the best child artist in New York City. The individual prizes were commemorative medals in the likeness of Rutherford B. Hayes (the nineteenth President of the United States). This was one of his most cherished possessions, and he carried it with him as an army intelligence officer during World War II.

Robert attended the Leonardo da Vinci School in New York from 1930 to 1938. He then attended New York University School of Architecture and Allied Arts, graduating with a Bachelor of Fine Arts, magna cum laude, in 1940. He then obtained an MFA from the Yale University School of Art in 1942. His masters thesis was on the Italian painter and sculptor Modigliani.

Robert was working on abstractions, portraits, cityscapes and representational works simultaneously during his years as a student at NYU and Yale.

== Military service ==
Robert served in the United States Army Rangers in Military Intelligence from 1943 to 1946.

In September 1945 as an officer in U.S. Army Intelligence, Master Sergeant Robert Borgatta (along with Corporal Nunzio Barbaro of Brooklyn and Lester J. McDonnell of Cleveland, Ohio) testified in the trial of Rita Louisa Zucca, also known as “Axis Sally.” Zucca, who had renounced her American citizenship in 1941, had been broadcasting Nazi propaganda to U.S. troops in the Mediterranean. The tribunal would sentence her to four years for conspiring with the enemy with the intent of demoralizing U.S. soldiers.

Robert was also featured on the front page of the Times for a more light-hearted piece regarding his liberation of a small Italian village.

Robert worked for the Office of Strategic Services (OSS), a precursor to the CIA, through his Army Rangers attachment, as an interrogator of Axis prisoners in Italy and North Africa. His fluency in five languages (French, Spanish, Italian, German and English), along with charm and presence, made him an effective interrogator. Despite these skills and his college degree, he refused officer commissions and stayed at the rank of Master Sergeant. His first hand experiences at Monte Cassino made him a lifelong pacifist and an anti-war activist during the Vietnam war.

== Early career ==
Robert had returned to New York a World War II veteran, having spent three years overseas (1943–46). His paintings in this period are mostly moody, dense urban landscapes and abstractions.

Upon his return, Robert received an important commission from the prizefighter Joe Louis to produce a mural for his nightclub and restaurant in Harlem; a fifty by eight foot mural (400 sq. ft.) depicting black contributions to American culture. Among the historic figures he portrayed were Booker T. Washington, Dr. George Washington Carver, Paul Robeson, Bill “Bojangles” Robinson and Marian Anderson. Robert's objective was to “represent most of the distinguished black personalities in American history”. Joe Louis was also a war veteran and, like Robert, an outsider in America. They were to remain lifelong friends, and Times Magazine published a photo of Robert visiting Joe in the hospital, shortly before he announced his retirement from boxing.

=== 1940-1960—Waterscapes ===
The waterscapes form a large collection ranging from the abstract to impressionistic. Promontories and the meeting of the land and sea are prevalent themes, and perspective takes on a full range of expression.

=== 1940-1960—Landscapes ===
An extensive collection, the landscapes include alpine scenes, cliffs, ravines and the Palisades. There are numerous panoramic paintings, including ‘From St. Michaels’, ‘Andalusia’ and ‘038’. These works were produced completely from sketches and recalled visits.

=== 1970s ===
For the first half of his life, Robert craved the acceptance and success he felt would come with being American. This was reflected in his position as a young tenured professor, the large number of solo gallery exhibitions, his execution of mural commissions, and his advertising graphics work. His ability to routinely sell his work, coupled with his salary as an art professor and other art-related income, meant he made his living and supported his family solely as an artist - a source of pride for him. Robert was also instrumental in obtaining jobs for his peers, including Phillip Pearlstein, among others.

Robert served on the board of directors of the National Society of Painters of Casein and was affiliated with the National Arts Club.

== Mid to later works ==
=== 1970-1980—Creation series ===
The Creation Series marked departures in previous painting styles. During this period, he was sculpting simultaneously while painting. Similar to the Babcock Galleries disapproving of him evolving away from genres they preferred, years earlier John Canaday the art critic had voiced similar frustration in several of his reviews of Robert's works. The issue of being pigeon-holed irked Robert, and the dictum that one could only be defined as a painter for one style was not acceptable to him. Continuing to venture into new genres, he created “slide triptychs” during the early seventies, where each panel of a painting would represent a greater magnification of his subject. In the egg and slide triptychs, the preliminary studies or smaller works would contain more depth of detail then the larger final works. His smaller watercolours completed his output during this period.

These significant changes in the direction of his work in terms of his paintings, and his new direction into sculpting, caused Robert's falling out with the Babcock Galleries. They would not show his sculpture because he was associated with their gallery as a painter, and they would not show the new creation paintings because these were too different from the mystical, moody abstractions and landscapes he was known for. Although he missed exhibiting, separating from the Babcock Galleries freed him from producing with exhibitions and sales in mind, and coincided with a new direction in his work, one that proved ultimately more introspection and brought him great personal satisfaction. A counterbalance to reduced exhibiting was the ability to work as he wished.

=== 1975-1985—Sculpture ===
During this period, Robert began sculpting (stone carving, mostly marble) and also painting what he later termed Egg Paintings, which became part of his Creation Series of paintings.

=== 1980-1990—Wilderness series ===
The charcoal drawings, flower paintings and close-ups of bodies of water and plants are his latest works and have never been exhibited. At least twenty of these paintings were sold from his studio to private collectors. Robert concentrated the latter part of his life on producing works rather than exhibiting. His painting subjects came from the national parks and gardens he visited, and he approached these works as portraits rather than landscapes. The water paintings and paintings of grasses were his personal favourites—he liked best what seemed chaotic or unorganized and then finding reason, patterns and rhythms, from a scene viewed at a park or garden.

The charcoal drawings would become the “Wilderness Series” and the themes and forms of these drawings found their way into the paintings. Robert would use turpentine to wet the paper and with a palette knife would work with this wet medium, creating the image from the black liquid mass. (This technique was borne from an accident when he had spilled turpentine on a charcoal drawing he had been working on). Once it dried, he would create the drawing by erasing light out of the charcoal mass. Attention to the negative spaces in a composition was a favourite theme in all of his works across media.

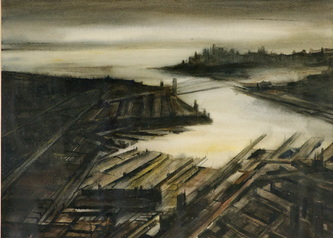
Wildernes No. 5

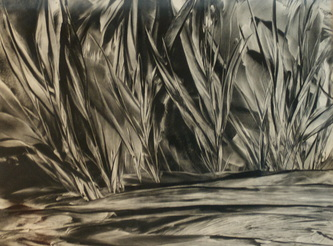
Wildernes No. 11

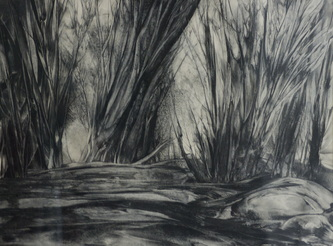
Wildernes No. 3

=== 1990-2000—Waterscapes ===
These waterscapes show a marked departure in style and content from the waterscapes during the 1940-1960 period. Gardens and natural parks like the Everglades were subject matters, and numerous photographs from 1990-2010 Photographic Studies for Paintings were used to plan these works.

=== 2000-2010—Flower portraits ===
Robert read Blake's Auguries of Innocence, and felt this poem best expressed his world view - "to see heaven in a wildflower". The flowers and waterscapes from the second half of his career were more representational, and were from prosaic locations (local gardens, first in New York then Florida). Robert took great delight when viewers of his work were surprised that the subject matter was a subway ride away or around the corner. The ability to go back and see a subject he was painting at different times in different lights and to see the flowers and plants go through death and come alive again in the next year enchanted him. For his entire life, Robert had been an inveterate traveller. As the physical aspects of travel became too laborious, his pragmatism refocused him in his immediate surroundings for subject matter.

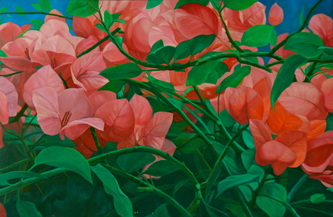
Bougainvillea

=== 1990-2010—Photographs ===
These photographic studies were used to plan the later waterscapes.

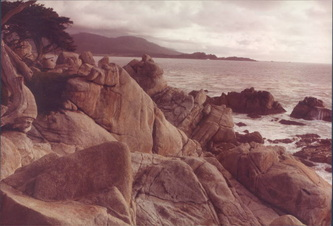
coast12

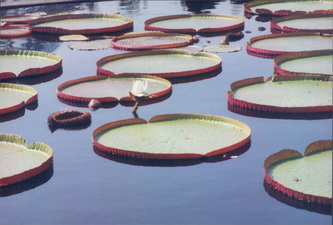
water lilies

== Influences ==
In sculpture, Borgatta admired and was influenced by the styles of Henry Moore, Barbara Hepworth, and the Cycladic period of art in Greece, as well as Constantin Brancusi and Alberto Giacometti, as he favoured pure, essential forms. He often said that he would trade all of his possessions for the Benin court ivory mask at the Metropolitan Museum of Art.

Borgatta often referred to anatomical drawings by Vesalius when composing his works, and he explored themes of bones and muscles in his sculpture.

Borgatta was interested in negative space and a minimalist perspective, which is shown in his landscapes compositions and later flower paintings. Cézanne’s use of perspective was also a great influence on his landscape painting.

In painting, Borgatta admired and studied a wide range of artists. Borgatta revisited the murals of the Renaissance regularly to understand composition. He greatly admired Tintoretto, Michelangelo and Raphael. He thought Michelangelo's unfinished Pieta was the most perfect expression of love and empathy, and admired it as a technical achievement in the ability as it shows evidence of the artist's journey through his chisel marks.

Borgatta took many trips to Venice to see the Scuola Grande di San Rocco murals by Tintoretto. It was frequently closed for various reasons, and it took five yearly of visits before he could view the entire works.

Borgatta's favourite landscape painter was Turner. His favourite portrait painter was Rembrandt, whose self-portrait represented Borgatta's goals as an artist: an unflinching representation of what was beautiful in painting and the visible hand of the artist shown in the brush strokes. Van der Weyden's Portrait of a Lady was his favourite work at the National Gallery. Hiroshige and his multiple perspectives influenced Robert in his preliminary studies for painting.

Chinese landscape drawings were also a source of inspiration for Borgatta, believing they were great examples of spiritual and intellectual unity. He enjoyed the Brook Astor Chinese court at the Met.

Robert was influenced by the work of Robert Mapplethorpe (particularly his images of decaying flowers) and Andy Warhol.

== Technical virtuosity ==
Relative to his peers, Robert seldom employed studio assistants and when he did, for limited purposes. He was well versed on technical aspects of creating art and he stretched and primed his own canvases and mixed his paints from dry pigment. He worked primarily in oil for painting and charcoal for drawings. In addition to his oil and acrylic paintings, Robert's works in pastel, water color, tempera and wood canvas are still in excellent un-restored condition. The same holds true for his approach to sculpture; works are mostly in marble and granite and small figures in jade and serpentine. He would begin a painting with gesture drawings, blocking out the large movements and composition. Paintings started as cartoons, followed by the primer color which was often cerulean—the base color beneath the snapdragons, or alizarin crimson for the gladioli.

== Exhibition history ==
=== Solo exhibitions ===
- Village Art Center, N.Y. 1953
- Wellons Gallery, N.Y. 1954
- City College, N.Y. 1958, 1964
- Hudson River Museum, Yonkers, N.Y. 1960
- Ringwood Museum, N.J. 1966, 1972
- Park College, Kansas City, MO. 1970
- Babcock Galleries, N.Y. 1964, 1968, 1970
- Southern Vermont Arts Center 1977
- Fine Arts Gallery, Harmon, N.Y. 1979

=== Select group exhibitions ===
- Weyhe Gallery, N.Y. 1945
- Roko Gallery, N.Y. 1950, 1979
- Associated Gallery of Art, Detroit, MI. 1955
- Riverside Museum 1956, 1958, 1960
- Schettini Gallery, Milan, Italy 1957
- New School, N.Y. 1958
- Glassboro College, N.J. 1961
- M.I.T., Cambridge, MA. 1962
- Corcoran Gallery, Washington 1966, 1968, 1970
- Whitney Museum 1954, 1966, 1968
- Museum of Modern Art (Penthouse) 1968
- Pennsylvania Academy 1957
- Loeb Center, N.Y.U. 1965, 1968
- Mansfield State College 1972
- Hudson River Museum 1972, 1974
- Bass Museum of Art, 1964

== Collections ==
- Chrysler Museum, Norfolk, VA
- Ford Foundation
- Yale University Art Gallery
- Mansfield State College
- Standard Motors Products Corporation
- Connecticut Mutual Life Insurance Co.
- Miller Associates
- Globus Travel, US Headquarters, Colorado
- Pfizer corporate art collection

== Grants and awards ==
- Tiffany Fellowship 1942
- Emily Lowe Foundation 1957
- MacDowell Colony Fellowship 1972, 1973
- Silvermine Guild 1954, 1958
- Audubon Artist Annuals 1955, 1958, 1969
- American Watercolor Society 1961, 1962
- National Society Painters In Casein and Acrylic 1961, 1970
