= Katrine Kielos =

Swedish writer and journalist

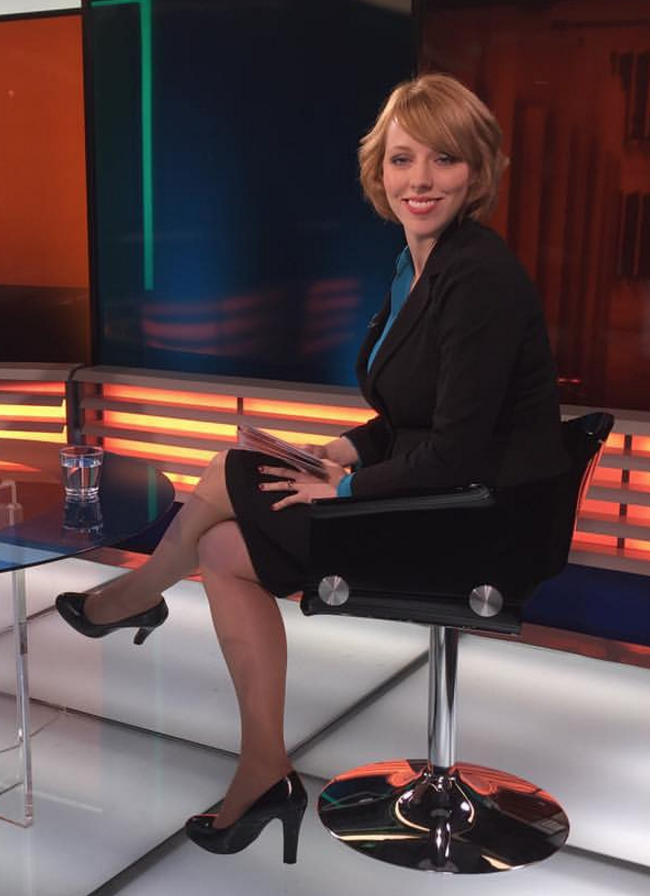
Katrine Kielos

Katrine Linda Mathilda Kielos (born 24 October 1983), known as Katrine Marçal from 2014 to 2023, is a Swedish author, journalist and correspondent for Swedish daily newspaper Dagens Nyheter.

== Biography ==
Kielos was born in Lund. She has served as chief editorialist of the Swedish newspaper Aftonbladet where she mainly wrote articles about Swedish and international financial politics and feminism. She has a Bachelor's degree from Uppsala universitet and has also been a freelance writer for Expressen's culture page. In 2013, the Swedish newspaper Dagens Nyheter awarded Kielos the third annual Lagercrantzen prize for critics. She received the Jolo Prize for Journalism in 2015.

Kielos has interviewed leading economists and investors like Nassim Nicholas Taleb and Steve Eisman as part of her work for the Swedish financial news channel EFN. Her interview with former Greek finance minister Yanis Varoufakis about the European debt crisis has been viewed more than 1 million times on YouTube. In 2015, she was listed as one of BBC's 100 Women.

== Written works ==
Apart from her journalism, Kielos has also written two books so far. Most famous of these are Det enda könet (The only sex, in Swedish), discusses the relationship between economics and patriarchy, was nominated for the August Prize in 2012. An English translation by Saskia Vogel was published in the United Kingdom under the title Who Cooked Adam Smith's Dinner?. The book has since been translated to 20 languages. Margaret Atwood called it "A smart, funny, readable book on economics, money [and] women.".

=== Who Cooked Adam Smith's Dinner? ===
The book Who Cooked Adam Smith's Dinner? from 2012 written by Kielos is feminist critique of economics that aims to expose the historical neglect of women's roles, particularly in domestic spheres. Kielos questions the simplistic paradigm of the "economic man" and highlights the influence of neoliberal ideology within contemporary economic thought. She traces the evolution of economics, where a economistic outlook was first seen as absurd and taboo only to gradually become normalized, exemplified by Gary Becker's ideas. Kielos reflects on Keynes' prediction (that was pessimistic in terms of growth) of a world in 2030 where waged work gives way to art, poetry and contemplation, contrasting it with what she refers to as the contemporary obsession with economic thought. She underscores how the notion of the "rational individuals" blinds us to societal issues and as well as comments that "What is good for the rich and powerful is almost always 'good for the economy".

== Personal life ==
It was reported in 2012 that she was living in Hertfordshire, England. She was formerly married to British garden designer Guy Marçal.

== Bibliography ==
- 2012 – Det enda könet (Who Cooked Adam Smith's Dinner?) ISBN 978-91-0012-461-8
- 2021 – Mother of Invention: How Good Ideas Get Ignored in an Economy Built for Men ISBN 978-00-0843-077-1 English edition of Att uppfinna världen
