= Makara (magazine) =

Feminist magazine

Cover of Makara

Makara was a Canadian feminist arts journal, produced in Vancouver, British Columbia from December 1975 to 1978 by the Pacific Women's Graphic Arts Co-operative, in co-operation with Press Gang Publishers. The collective began work in 1972–73.

The magazine was billed as "The Canadian magazine by women for people" and it "sought to explore alternatives to traditional journal structures and work toward positive social change" and reflect concerns arising from the women's movement at the populist and academic levels.

Makara stopped publishing after 13 issues because it was not self-supporting; sales and advertising revenues did not cover printing costs or salaries, and a government grant which had sustained it ended. Journalist Eleanor Wachtel describes a major problem faced by feminist magazines and journals in Canada in her 1983 report on Feminist Print Media as involving "a small population stretched out across 4000 miles".

The magazine's fonds were donated to author Margo Dunn and can now be found in the Simon Fraser University archives in Vancouver.
