= Elizabeth Toth =

Public relations academic

Elizabeth Lance Toth is professor emeritus at the University of Maryland, College Park known for her work on public relations research.

== Education and career ==
Toth has a B.A. from Northwestern University and an M.A. and a Ph.D from Purdue University. She worked in public relations from 1969 until 1981, before moving into academia. Toth taught at Southern Methodist University and Southern Illinois University, and was the associate dean of the S. I. Newhouse School of Public Communications at Syracuse University. In 2004 she joined the University of Maryland where she was professor and chair of the Department of Communication. As of 2022, Toth is an emeritus professor at the University of Maryland, College Park.

Toth was the editor of the Journal of Public Relations Research from 1995 until 2000.

She is known for her work on the role of women and gender in public relations.

== Select publications ==
- Grunig, Larissa A. (2013). Women in public relations : how gender influences practice. Linda Childers Hon, Elizabeth L. Toth. London: Routledge. ISBN 978-0-415-65328-2. OCLC 812070401.
- Rhetorical and critical approaches to public relations II. Robert L. Heath, Elizabeth L. Toth, Damion Waymer. New York: Routledge. 2009. ISBN 978-0-8058-6423-6. OCLC 237199154.
- Aldoory, Linda; Toth, Elizabeth L. (2021). The future of feminism in public relations and strategic communication : a socio-ecological model of influences. Lanham, Maryland. ISBN 978-1-5381-2825-1. OCLC 1240264311.

== Awards and honors ==
In 2012 she was honored by the University of Alabama's Plank Center. In 2020, the Public Relations Society of America presented Toth with the Sage Award.
