= Who Cooked Adam Smith's Dinner? =

2012 book by Katrine Marçal

Who Cooked Adam Smith's Dinner?: A Story About Women and Economics
- Author: Katrine Marçal
- Original title: Det enda könet. Varför du är förförd av den ekonomiske mannen och hur det förstör ditt liv och världsekonomin
- Translator: Saskia Vogel
- Language: Swedish
- Subject: Feminist economics
- Publisher: Albert Bonniers Förlag
- Publication date: 2012
- Publication place: Stockholm
- English publication date: 2015
- Media type: Print
- Pages: 303 pages
- ISBN: 9789100124618
- LC Class: HQ1381 .M36 2012

Who Cooked Adam Smith's Dinner?: A Story About Women and Economics (Swedish: Det enda könet. Varför du är förförd av den ekonomiske mannen och hur det förstör ditt liv och världsekonomin) is a 2012 book by Swedish writer and journalist Katrine Marçal that offers a critique of economics. Marçal argues that there has historically been neglect and underestimation of women's societal contributions and that women lack representation in theories within the field of economics.

An English translation by Saskia Vogel was published by Portobello Books in 2015.

== Content ==
Marçal's critique challenges the long-standing oversight of women's roles, particularly within the domestic sphere. She exposes how economists have consistently disregarded the intricate fabric of domestic activities that underpins society.

=== Economistic thinking ===
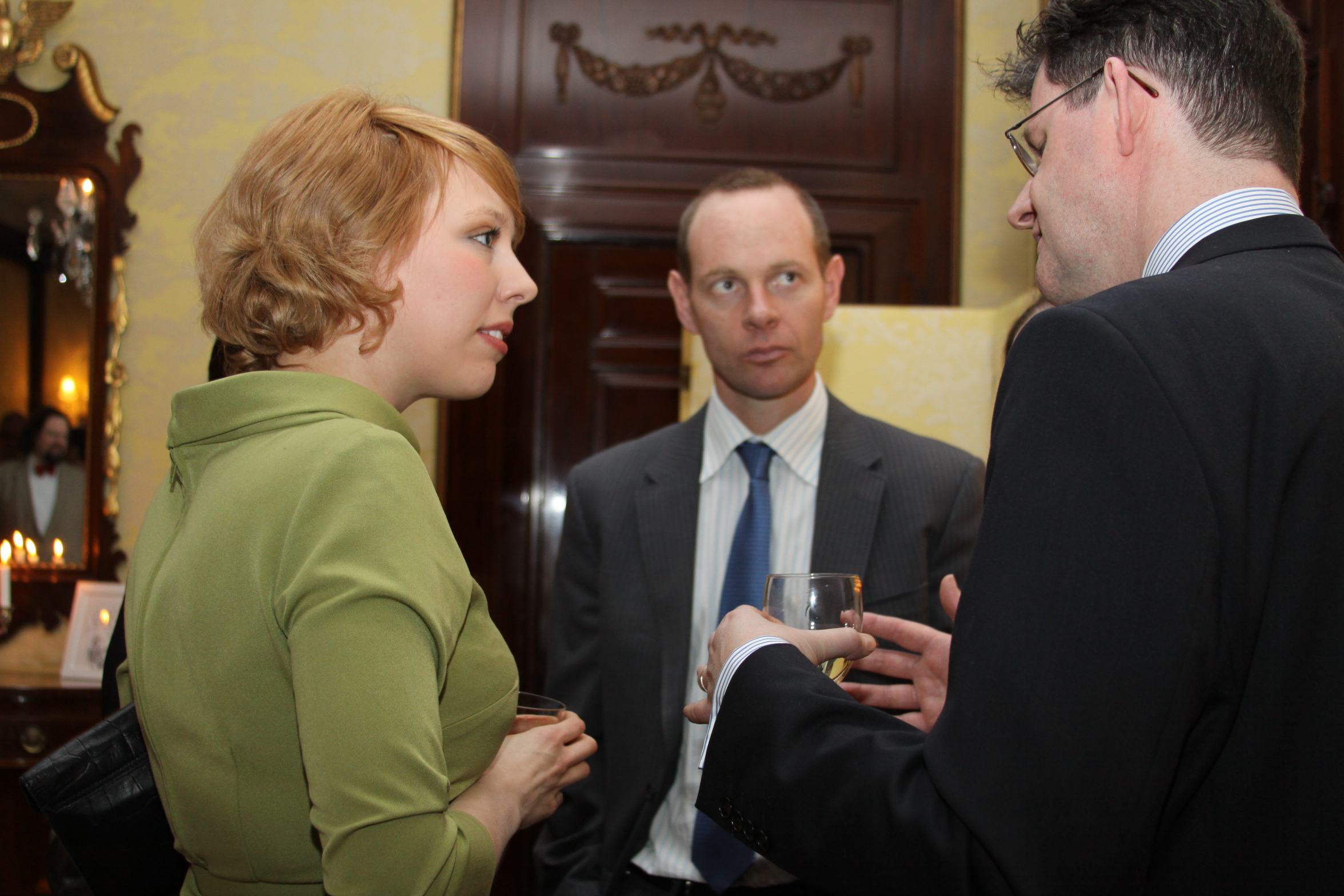
Marçal in 2012

Marçal notices a historical progression in how society has become more and more obsessed with economics. For example, Marçal notes that Gary Becker's economistic thinking was considered taboo within the field of economics at first since it was too extreme. Since Becker's definition of economics was "that it was a logic that can be applied to the whole world". However, this position came to be seen as increasingly normal. Becker was subsequently awarded the Sveriges Riksbank Prize in Economic Sciences in Memory of Alfred Nobel.

=== Neoliberal ideology ===
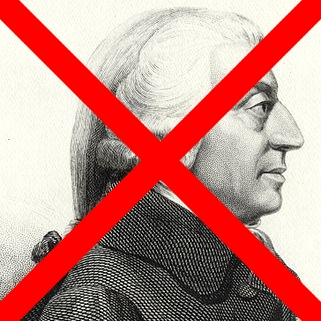
Marçal critiques Adam Smith and economists more broadly both for failing to acknowledge domestic activities and trying to copy a method inspired by Newton in a scientistic manner, which she argues is ill-equipped for managing human affairs.

The book underscores the pervasive influence of neoliberal ideology in shaping the economic discipline. Central to Marçal's critique is the concept of the so-called "economic man," a prevailing but overly simplistic paradigm within economics. Marçal presents Keynes' usage of "economic man" as a transient construct. As she puts it: "a useful idiot" inviting reflection on the potential evolution of paradigms of resource allocation. She also notes how Keynes made calculations (that later turned out to be very pessimistic since "we" are in fact richer than Keynes predicted) regarding that we would be able to stop working before 2030 and devote ourselves to "art, poetry, spiritual values, philosophy, taking pleasure in life, and admiring the 'lilies of the field'".

=== Contemporary analysis of the relationship between society and economics ===
However, instead Marçal notes that society instead has regressed into a state where we rather are "more obsessed with economics than ever" with it being used to attempt to calculate the value of everything from "vanilla ice cream to the value of a human life". Marçal also point out how the notion that humans are "rational individuals" that came to be commonplace within economics and then spread to wider society makes social issues invisible. She gives an example: "When we are all rational individuals, questions like race, class and sex become irrelevant. Why, we are all free. Like the woman in the Congo. She who agrees to militia men having sex with her in exchange for three tins of food. Or the woman in Chile. She who works as a fruit picker even though the exposure to pesticides will lead to nerve damage in the child she will give birth to two years later. [...] They always make the best possible decisions." She also notes that "What is good for the rich and powerful is almost always 'good for the economy'.".

== See also ==
- Wages for housework
- Feminist critique of economics
- Roswitha Scholz
- J. K. Gibson-Graham
