= Joanna Frueh =

Performance artist and feminist scholar (1948–2020)

- Frueh in 2008
- Born: January 18, 1948; Chicago, Illinois, US
- Died: February 20, 2020; Tucson, Arizona, US
- Education: Ph.D. University of Chicago
- Known for: Feminist criticism Performance art Contemporary Art history
- Notable work: Monster Beauty: Building the Body of Love
- Spouse(s): Thomas Kochheiser, Russell Dudley, Kathleen G. Williamson
- Website: joannafrueh.com

Joanna Frueh (January 18, 1948 – February 20, 2020) was an American artist, writer and feminist scholar.

== Early life and education ==
Frueh was born on January 18, 1948, in Chicago, Illinois to Erne Rene Frueh and Florence (Pass) Frueh. Both parents were well educated; her father in visual arts and her mother in classical piano. Together they authored a book about stained glass in Chicago, which was published by Loyola University Press in 1983. Their two successive homes in Highland Park were designed by architects Crombie Taylor and Robert Bruce Tague.

Frueh received her Bachelor of Art from Sarah Lawrence College in 1970; and her Master of Arts from the University of Chicago in 1971; and her PhD, from the University of Chicago in 1981.

== Career ==
Frueh was the director of Artemisia Gallery, in Chicago, one of the earliest women's art galleries in the United States during 1974–1976. Her book Monster Beauty: Building the Body of Love, dealing with the aesthetics of beauty, pleasure and the erotic in everyday life was published by the University of California Press. Her writing combined theory with autobiography, photography, and poetry.

Frueh authored and edited several books, notably Erotic Faculties (University of California Press, 1996) and Hannah Wilke: A Retrospective (1989); and was coeditor of Picturing the Modern Amazon (2000), Feminist Art Criticism: Art, Identity, Action (1994), and Feminist Art Criticism: An Anthology (1991). She wrote articles and reviews for Art in America, Art Journal, AfterImage, High Performance Magazine, and New Art Examiner, among others.

Freuh was also a photographer and performance artist; many of her photographs are collaborative self-portraits. Her work was exhibited internationally.

== Teaching ==
She was Professor Emerita of Art History at the University of Nevada, Reno, where she served from 1990 to 2006. Prior to that she was assistant professor of art history at Oberlin College, Oberlin, Ohio, (1983–1985) and the University of Arizona, Tucson (1981–1983).

== Awards ==
Frueh was awarded a Women's Caucus for Art Honor Award for Lifetime Achievement in the Visual Arts in 2008.

== Published works ==
=== Books ===
- BRUMAS: A Rock Star's Passage to a Life Re-Vamped. Includes series of black-and-white self-portrait photos shot by Glascock and Glascock. Oberlin, Ohio and Ukiah, California: Freshcut Press, 1982.
- Hannah Wilke: A Retrospective. With Hannah Wilke and Thomas H. Kochheiser. St. Louis, Missouri: University of Missouri Press, 1989.
- Feminist Art Criticism: An Anthology. Co-edited with Arlene Raven and Cassandra L. Langer. New York, New York: Icon Editions, 1991. Second edition. New York, New York: Routledge, 2019.
- New Feminist Criticism: Art, Identity, Action. Co-edited with Arlene Raven and Cassandra L. Langer. New York, New York: Icon Editions, 1993.
- Erotic Faculties. Berkeley, California: University of California Press, 1996.
- Picturing the Modern Amazon. With the New Museum of Contemporary Art. New York, New York: Rizzoli, 1999.
- Monster/Beauty: Building the Body of Love. Berkeley, California: University of California Press, 2001.
- The Glamour of Being Real. Tucson: ErneRené Press, 2013.
- Joanna Frueh: A Retrospective. With Tanya Augsburg and Sheppard Fine Art Gallery. Reno, Nevada: Nevada Museum of Art, 2005.
- Swooning Beauty: A Memoir of Pleasure. Reno, Nevada: University of Nevada Press, 2006.
- Clairvoyance (For Those In The Desert): Performance Pieces, 1979–2004. Durham, North Carolina: Duke University Press, 2008.
- Unapologetic Beauty. With Frances Murray. Minneapolis, Minnesota: University of Minnesota Press, 2019.

== Death ==
Frueh died in Tucson, Arizona, on February 20, 2020, due to complications from breast cancer. Her archives are located at Stanford University Library Special Collections.

== See also ==
- Feminist art criticism
- Feminist art
- Performance art
