= Katy Deepwell =

Feminist art critic and academic

- Occupations: Feminist art critic, academic

Katy Deepwell is a feminist art critic and academic, based in London. She is the founder and editor of n.paradoxa: international feminist art journal, published 1998–2017. Over 500 articles are available in its 40 volumes from more than 80 countries. She founded KT press as a feminist not-for-profit publishing company to publish the journal and books on feminist art and today it maintains The Feminist Art Observatory. KT press has published 8 e-books supported by the Andy Warhol Foundation for the Visual Arts and a further 6 print books.

In Feb 2017, Katy Deepwell wrote and published a MOOC (a mass open online course) on feminism and contemporary art at. In May 2020, a second advanced course on feminist art manifestos was added to the site. The model for both MOOCs is FemTechNet’s DOCC: Distributed Open Collaborative Course.

n.paradoxa: international feminist art journal was part of the Documenta 12 Magazines Project in 2007: as a specialist art magazine with articles on women artists from around the world. The journal released all articles as open access PDFs in 2018, and continued to produce The Feminist Art Observatory, listing information about contemporary women artists and feminism.

She was President of the British Section of AICA (International Association of Art Critics), 1997–2000. She was Chair of Trustees of Women's Art Library, London, 1989–1994, a national charity and library on women artists which closed in 2002, now housed at Goldsmiths, University of London.

Her work has been centred on the promotion of feminism in relation to the contemporary art and art criticism.

== Early life and education ==
Deepwell trained as an artist at St Martins School of Art, 1982–1985. She then obtained a M.A. Social History of Art from University of Leeds in 1986 and a PhD from Birkbeck College, University of London in 1991.

== Works ==
=== Academic work ===
Deepwell is a former Professor of Contemporary Art, Theory and Criticism at Middlesex University, 2013-Feb 2025. She was Senior Research Fellow at the Global Dis: Connect Project, Kate Hamburger Kolleg, LMU Munich, Oct 2025-March 2026. Katy Deepwell has taught since 1986 in different Universities in UK and Europe. She was Reader in Contemporary Art, Theory and Criticism and Head of Research Training at University of the Arts London (2004–2010) and Post-Doctoral Research Fellow at University of Ulster, Belfast (1999-2002).

She has worked as a lecturer teaching art history and art theory in universities and art schools including Goldsmiths' College, Oxford Brookes University, Kent Institute of Art and Design and University of Copenhagen since 1986. She was a Leverhulme Research Fellow (Leverhulme Trust) in 2008–2009. In 2021, she was awarded a Distinguished Feminist Scholar award as an art critic by College Art Association in USA.

=== Publications and editorial works ===
Sole Authored:

- Conversations on Art, artworks and feminism (London: KT press, 2025) ISBN 978-0-9926934-8-0
- Women Artists Between the Wars: ‘A Fair Field and No Favour’ (Manchester: Manchester University Press, 2010) ISBN 978-0-7190-8080-7.
- Dialogues: Women Artists from Ireland. (London: IB Tauris, 2005). ISBN 1-85043-621-5
- Ten Decades: The Careers of Ten Women Artists born 1897-1906, Exhibition Catalogue of Arts Council Touring Exhibition, Norwich Gallery, NIAD, April 1992, ISBN 1-872482-05-8

Edited volumes:

- Re-Evaluations in Feminism and Contemporary Art Volume 1 and Volume 2 (USA and Spain, Vernon Press, 2026) ISBN 979-8-2616-0032-9
- De-/Anti-/Post-colonial Feminisms in Contemporary Art and Textile Crafts (London: KT press, 2023) ISBN 978-0-9926934-7-3
- 50 Feminist Art Manifestos (London: KT press, 2022) ISBN 978-0-9926934-6-6
- Feminist Art Activisms and Artivisms (Netherlands: Valiz, published March 2020) ISBN 978-94-92095-72-5
- All-Women Art Spaces in Europe in the Long 1970s (co-edited with Agata Jakubowska) (Liverpool: Liverpool University Press, 2018) ISBN 978-1-78694-058-2
- Feminist Art Manifestos: An Anthology (London: KT press, ebook, 2014) ISBN 978-0-9926934-3-5 https://www.amazon.com/dp/B00PBBVLQU
- The Gender, Theory and Art Anthology: 1970-2000 [English title of Russian book] (co-edited with Mila Bredikhina) (Moscow: Rosspen Publishing House, 2005) ISBN 5-8243-0595-1
- Women Artists and Modernism (Manchester: Manchester University Press, 1998). ISBN 0-7190-5082-0.
- Art Criticism and Africa(Saffron Books, July 1997) ISBN 1-872843-13-1
- New Feminist Art Criticism: Critical Strategies (Manchester: Manchester University Press, 1995) ISBN 0-7190-4258-5 – also translated to Spanish: Nueva Critica Feminista de Arte (Universidad de Valencia, 1998). ISBN 84-376-1632-8

Recent essays

- 'The Politics and Aesthetic Choices of Feminist Art Criticism' Arts (MDPI journal) Special Issue on ‘Beyond/Around Feminist Aesthetics’, March 2023.
- ‘Art Criticism and the State of Feminist Art Criticism’ Arts (MDPI journal) Special Issue on ‘State of Art Criticism’, Feb 2020.
- ‘Why 1989? Writing about feminism, art and "the global contemporary"’ in Elvan Zabunyan et al, Constellations Subjectivités. Pour une Histoire Féministes de L'Art (France: éditions iXe, 2020) ISBN 979-10-90062-51-1
- ‘Postdigital Education, Feminism, Women’ Postdigital Education (Springer) (Jan 2020)
- ‘Art Criticism and Africa: AICA Conference at the Courtauld Institute, London, 1996’ in Jean-Marc Poinsot and Henry Meyric Hughes (eds) A Celebration of AICA’s 70th Anniversary / Une Célébration du 70ème anniversaire de l’AICA: 1949-50 – 2019-20. The Histories of AICA, continued (online publication on AICA International website, 25 September 2019).
- ‘n.paradoxa’s MOOC (mass open online course): A case study in feminist online pedagogies’ for Gail Crimmins (ed) Strategies for Resisting Sexism in the Academy : Higher Education, Gender and Neoliberalism (Series: Palgrave Studies in Gender and Education, 2019) ISBN 978-3-030-04851-8
- Interview with Silvia Ziranek: ‘I enjoy appearance, colour, shape and form – and I love dressing up’ Studio International online, September 2019.

- ‘On feminist art manifestos’ Cambridge Literary Review, no. 11 (2018) pp. 121–132
- ‘Feminist contributions to artworks in Slide-Tape’ in Mo White (ed) Slide-Tape (UK: Vivid Projects, 2018)
- ‘Feminist Critique: Open and Critical Enquiry: A Conversation between Katy Deepwell and Suzana Milevska’ in Spaces for Criticism (eds. Pascal Gielen, Thijs Lijster, Suzana Milevska, Ruth Sonderegger) (Amsterdam: Valiz publishers, 2015) ISBN 978-90-78088-75-2 pp. 171–192.
- ‘Women Artists in/out of Vorticism’ in G. Berghaus (ed) International Yearbook of Futurism Studies (2015) ISBN 978-3-11-040850-8 pp. 21–43
- ‘We don’t need another heroine: Sanja Ivekovic’s Counter-Narratives’ in Helena Reckitt (ed) Sanja Ivekovic: Unknown Heroine - A Reader (London: Calvert 22 Foundation, 2013) ISBN 978-0-9569628-9-8 pp. 110–133
- ‘Beatrice Cussol: Feminist, not feminine’ in Mia Sundberg (ed) Beatrice Cussol: Rude Girls (Stockholm: Art and Theory/Sprit Museum, 2013) ISBN 978-91-980874-3-7 pp. 35–45
- 'Questioning the gender order: feminist interventions in aesthetics and cultural politics' Artistic Production and the Feminist Theory of Art: New Debates 3 (Vitoria-Gasteiz: Centro Cultural Montehermoso, 2011) Basque, pp. 30–42; Spanish pp. 150–164; English, pp. 270–282.
- 'Claims for a Feminist Politics in Painting' in Anne Ring Petersen (et al., eds.) Contemporary Painting in Context (University of Copenhagen, Novo Nordisk Foundation, 2009) ISBN 978-876-352597-8 pp. 139–160
- 'Cooling out on Post-Feminism' in Sabine Schaschl, Bettina Steinbrugge, and Rene Zechlin (eds) Cooling Out: On the Paradox of Feminism (Zurich: JRP Ringier, 2008) (English, pp. 74–83, German pp. 248–257)
- Mehr also sieben dringender Fragen zum Feminismusí in Gisela Weimann (ed.) Geteilte Zeit: Fragen und Antworten (Weimar, Edition Eselsweg, 2008). Text in German and English. pp. 237–243
  - Republished as More than seven urgent questions for feminism online in English in n.paradoxa issue 20 online, April 2008
- 'Women War Artists in the First World War in Britain' in Karen Brown (ed) Agency and Mediation amongst Women Artists between the Wars (Ashgate Press, 2008) pp. 11–36
- 'Feminist Models: Now and in the Future' in It's Time for Action (There's No Option) About Feminism Migros Museum (Zurich/ JRP Ringier Kunstverlag, 2007) German pp. 43–63, English pp. 190–208
- 'Issues in Feminist Curation: Strategies and Practices' in Janet Marstine (ed) An Introduction to New Museum Theory (USA: Blackwells, 2006) ISBN 1-4051-0558-5 pp. 64–84
- 'DÈfier l'indiffÈrence a la diffÈrence: les paradoxes de la critique d'art fÈministe' in Pierre-Henry Frangne & Jean-Marc Poinsot (eds) L'Invention de Critique D'Art (France: Presses Universitaires de Rennes, 2002, text in French) ISBN 2-86847-660-0 pp. 191–205
- 'Women, Representation and Speculations on the End of History Painting' for N.Green and P.Seddon (ed) History Painting Reassessed (Manchester University Press, October 2000) ISBN 0-7190-5168-1 pp. 131–148
- 'Text and Subtexts' in Binghui Huangfu (ed) Text and Subtext: Contemporary Art and Asian Women Earl-Lu Gallery, Lasalle-SIA College of Arts, Singapore. Book for International Touring Exhibition of Contemporary Asian Women Artists. Curator: Binghui Huangfu. (June 2000) ISBN 981-04-2718-2 pp. 33–41
- 'Curating Feminist Histories' in Power Ekroth, Tove Helander (eds) Expositioner: Antologi On Utstallningsmediet: The Exhibition as an Artistic Medium Stockholm: Konstfack, 2000 published for the Sollentuna Art Fair, Stockholm. (March 2000) ISBN 91-630-9243-3 pp. 88–96
