= N.paradoxa =

n.paradoxa
- Discipline: Art criticism, feminist art, art history, art theory
- Language: English
- Edited by: Katy Deepwell

Publication details
- History: 1996–2017
- Publisher: KT press
- Frequency: Biannual

Standard abbreviations
- ISO 4: n.paradoxa

Indexing
- ISSN: 1461-0434 (print); 1461-0426 (web)
- LCCN: sn99017107
- OCLC no.: 40759869

Links
- Journal homepage; Online archive

n.paradoxa: international feminist art journal was a biannual academic journal covering feminist art criticism and the work of women artists since the 1970s. It was published by KT press and the editor-in-chief was Katy Deepwell (London).

The print journal (printed as volumes) was established by Deepwell in 1998. Prior to this, n.paradoxa existed as an online journal (issues 1–21, ISSN 1461-0426) which was established in 1996 and this parallel edition online ran until 2010 with entirely different content to the print journal. Each volume of n.paradoxa focused on a particular theme and typically included articles devoted to art theory and criticism from a feminist perspective, as well as interviews with artists. The website contained extensive online resources on feminism in the visual arts internationally, including reviews of exhibits, books, and websites. n.paradoxa participated in the Documenta 12 magazines project as part of the 2007 documenta exhibition in Kassel. After 2011, volumes were simultaneously published in print and electronic format online.

The journal ceased publication in 2017.
