= Carol Duncan =

American art historian

- Born: 1936 (age 89–90); Chicago, Illinois
- Known for: Feminist Art History
- Movement: Feminism, Marxist feminism

Carol Greene Duncan is a Marxist-feminist scholar known as a pioneer of ‘new art history’, a social-political approach to art, who is recognized for her work in the field of Museum Studies, particularly her inquiries into the role that museums play in defining cultural identity.

== Education ==
Carol Duncan earned a BA from University of Chicago in 1958, a MA from the University of Chicago in 1960, and a Ph.D. from Columbia University, where she wrote on “the survival and the full re-emergence of the Rococo tradition in French painting during the late 18th and 19th centuries.”

=== Teaching ===
Carol Duncan served as a faculty member in the Ramapo College School of Contemporary Arts from 1972 until she retired in 2005. She is Professor Emerita at Ramapo College.

== Work ==
Duncan's work examines the critical role that museums play in defining cultural identity.

In the 1970s Duncan and fellow feminist art historians, Linda Nochlin and Lise Vogel, first questioned formerly hallowed principals such as the idea of quality in art, the canon of great artists and art and artistic genius.

Her 1973 essay “Virility and Domination in Early Twentieth-Century Vanguard Painting" proposed a study of modernist male painters and the women they painted: Duncan questions the freedom of the models portrayed, examining closely their body language and insertion in the artist’s world (frequently, his studio). By providing examples of paintings of women’s’ bodies brutally depicted she is able to justify her criticism of the supposed “originality” of the modernist nude.

Her 1975 essay, "When Greatness is a Box of Wheaties" is considered a key text of feminist art history, articulating the feminist critique of genius in art.

Duncan's well known 1989 essay "The MoMA's Hot Mamas" explores the social implications of representations of women in paintings arguing that two renowned paintings of women by men in the Museum of Modern Art, de Kooning's Woman I and Picasso's Les Demoiselles d'Avignon, emphasize the 'monstrosity' of the female, creating a gender based cultural division that parallels the division of pornography, in which the woman is made into a vision/object by the male creator. She can only view a version of woman that is defined by the male creator, but is denied the role of creator and thus denied entry to "the central arena of high culture".

== Books and essay contributions ==
Carol Duncan is the author of many books and essays, including the following.

=== Books ===
- A Matter of Class: John Cotton Dana, Progressive Reform, and the Newark Museum (Periscope Publishing, 2009).
- Civilizing Rituals: Inside Public Art Museums (Routledge, 1995).
- The Aesthetics of Power: Essays in the Critical Art History (Cambridge University Press, 1993).
- The Pursuit of Pleasure : The Rococo Revival in French Romantic Art (Garland Publishing, 1976).

==== Essays ====
- "Putting the "Nation" in London's National Gallery." In The Formation of National Collections of Art and Archaeology. Studies in the History of Art 47 (1996): 101–111.
- "The MoMA's Hot Mamas." Art Journal 48, no.2 (Summer 1989): 171–178.
- "Virility and Domination in Early Twentieth-Century Vanguard Painting." Artforum (December 1973): 30–39.
- "Happy Mothers and Other New Ideas in French Art." The Art Bulletin 55, no.4 (1973): 570–583.

== Legacy ==
The Carol Duncan Scholarship, is a scholarship endowment created by Duncan to benefit students of the Visual Arts.
