= Lise Vogel =

American Marxist-feminist sociologist and art historian (b. 1938)

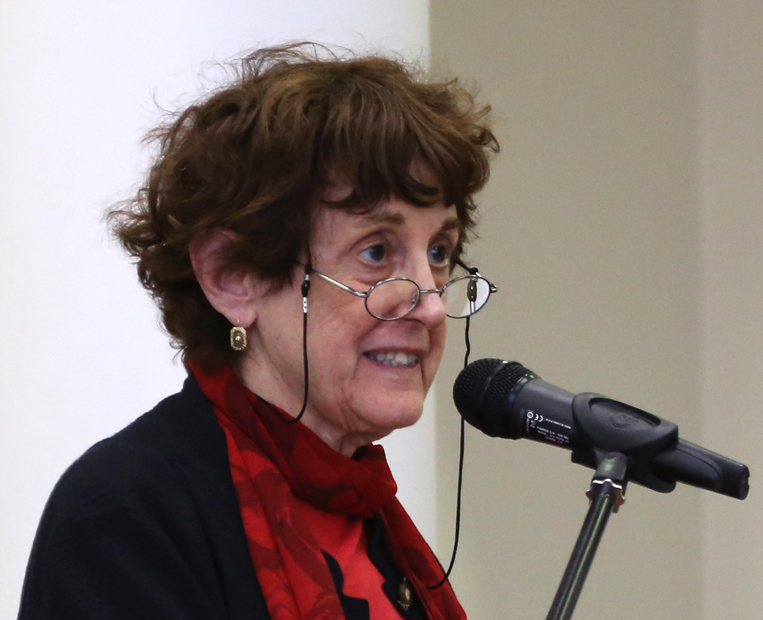
- Lise Vogel in 2015
- Born: 1938 (age 87–88); New York City
- Occupations: Sociologist and art historian
- Known for: Marxist-feminist theoretician and activist for civil rights and women's liberation
- Notable work: Marxism and the Oppression of Women: Toward a Unitary Theory Woman Questions: Essays for a Materialist Feminism Mothers on the Job: Maternity Policy in the U.S. Workplace The Column of Antoninus Pius

Lise Vogel is a feminist sociologist and art historian from the United States. An influential Marxist-feminist theoretician, she is recognised for being one of the main founders of the Social Reproduction Theory. She also participated in the civil rights and the women's liberation movements in organisations such as the Student Nonviolent Coordinating Committee (SNCC) in Mississippi and Bread & Roses in Boston. In her earlier career as an art historian, she was one of the first to try to develop a feminist perspective on Art History.

== Biography ==
Lise Vogel was born in New York City. Her father, Sidney Vogel, was a distinguished American doctor who volunteered during the Spanish Civil War on the side of the Spanish Republic between 1937 and 1939. Being raised in the United States in a left-wing family during the Cold War, she learned from a very young age to think critically and question the way society works.

She received her A.B. degree from Radcliffe College in 1960 and then became a doctoral student in Art History at Harvard University. During her time in graduate school, she became involved in the anti-war and civil rights movements and she worked with the Student Nonviolent Coordinating Committee (SNCC) in Mississippi between 1964 and 1965. In the late 60's, she participated in the emerging women's liberation movement, taking the side of its socialist feminist wing, and joined the organization Bread & Roses in Boston.

She finished her Ph.D. in Art History in 1968 and soon started to teach at Brown University. In her initial career as an art historian, she published The Column of Antoninus Pius as well as some of the first articles on feminist art history and women's history. She also taught courses on these topics, which was an innovation.

In 1976, she started another doctorate at Brandeis University in Sociology, finishing in 1981, two years before publishing her most influential work: Marxism and the Oppression of Women: Toward a Unitary Theory. She taught sociology at Rider University until her retirement in 2003.

== Topics of research ==
As an art historian, Lise Vogel conducted research on Roman Imperial relief sculpture in her first Ph.D., which was published in the monograph The Column of Antoninus Pius and many articles. She also contributed to the newly developing feminist perspective on Art History.

As she moved into the field of sociology, she studied the Marxist tradition in relation to the woman question, analyzing the most relevant texts as well as the evolution of the Marxist movement's positions on the woman question and identifying two contradictory legacies that had coexisted since the beginning of Marxism. In addition, she participated in crucial debates within socialist feminism, such as the domestic labor debate and the issue of how to articulate Marxism and feminism. Both the research on the woman question traditions in Marxism and the analyses of socialist feminist work are discussed in the book Marxism and the Oppression of Women: Toward a Unitary Theory, first published in 1983.

After the publication of Marxism and the Oppression of Women, she kept working on the development of Marxist-feminist theory, focusing on family, maternity, workplace and gender policies among other topics. She studied the current state of feminism, analyzing the debates between the equality and difference perspectives in relation to maternity leave and other public policies. Such research is mostly developed in her book Mothers on the Job: Maternity Policy in the U.S. Workplace (1993) as well as in numerous articles, some of them included in Woman Questions: Essays for a Materialist Feminism (1995).

== Contributions to Marxist-feminist theory ==
=== A unitary theory ===
Lise Vogel has put some light on the development of the Marxist thought on the woman question. As Johanna Brenner mentions, feminists – including a great part of socialist feminists – had commonly assumed that "classical Marxist theory had little to say about women's oppression, and the little it had to say was wrong". This led to the adoption of a dual system theory by most socialist feminists with two parallel autonomous structures of oppression (patriarchy and capitalism), an approach in which Marxism, which could only explain class exploitation but not women's oppression, had to be combined with feminism, a necessary theory to explain the patriarchal oppression of women. One of the most paradigmatic and influential texts holding this approach was Heidi Hartmann’s article The Unhappy Marriage of Marxism and Feminism: Towards a More Progressive Union. Lise Vogel challenges this view in her book Marxism and the Oppression of Women as well as in other articles, defending a unitary perspective (she also has a text in response to Hartmann’s article in which she argues that there is no need for "some new synthesis between Marxism or socialism, and feminism. Rather, it is Marxist theory itself that must be developed, and socialist practice that must be transformed").

=== Marxist legacies on the woman question ===
In Marxism and the Oppression of Women, she reviews the most important texts of the Marxist woman question and identifies two legacies that have coexisted: the dual system perspective and the social reproduction perspective. The dual-system approach understands women's oppression as deriving from "their situation within an autonomous system of sex-divisions of labor and male supremacy", viewing class and gender as two autonomous structures. Women's oppression and class-oppression are viewed as essentially independent and there is the implicit idea that two motors drive the development of history: class-struggle and sex-struggle. This dual character can be seen, for instance, in the commonly cited fragment from Engels's preface to the first edition of The Origin of the Family, Private Property and the State:

“According to the materialistic conception, the determining factor in history is, in the final instance, the production and reproduction of immediate life. This, again, is of a twofold character: on the one side, the production of the means of existence, of food, clothing and shelter and the tools necessary for that production; on the other side, the production of human beings themselves, the propagation of the species. The social organization under which the people of a particular historical epoch and a particular country live is determined by both kinds of production: by the stage of development of labour on the one hand and of the family on the other.”

This legacy continued with the works of August Bebel, Eleanor Marx and Edward Aveling and has been inherited by the dual system socialist feminists.

By contrast, Vogel argues that the social reproduction perspective comes from Marx's Capital, and consists on the idea that "women’s oppression has its roots in women’s differential location within social reproduction as a whole". According to this approach, class struggle would be the central dynamic of social development, and the major characteristic of a class society would still be the appropriation of surplus-labor by the dominant class. Nevertheless, this appropriation would require the constant renewal of the working class, including generational replacement, in which women play a vital role.

Despite situating the roots for this perspective in Marx's Capital, it's important to remark that Marx doesn't talk about the position of women, nor does he mention domestic or reproductive labor, in the Capital’s section Simple reproduction, where the idea of social reproduction is presented. Yet, Marx introduces the eloquent idea that capitalist production needs the constant reproduction of the workers through the transformation of the means of subsistence into the labor power. Lise Vogel’s contribution is precisely to situate women’s oppression and domestic labor in this scheme, founding what would later be called the Social Reproduction Theory. However, she argues that some Marxists (she mentions Lenin and Clara Zetkin) had already conceived the woman question from the point of view of the reproduction of labor power. Therefore, this approach can also be considered a legacy from Marxism. The development of the social reproduction perspective (or the Social Reproduction Theory), can be considered Vogel’s major contribution to Marxist-feminist theory.

=== On the domestic labor debate ===
Regarding the domestic labor debate, Vogel conceptualizes domestic labor as the necessary labor that reproduces labor power. She points out that, as reproductive labor, it doesn’t produce surplus-value but only use-value. Therefore, it doesn’t fit into the Marxist category of productive labor. She argues that it should be situated in the Marxist category of necessary labor instead. In her own words: "Domestic labour is the portion of necessary labour that is performed outside the sphere of capitalist production. For the reproduction of labour-power to take place, both the domestic and the social components of necessary labour are required".

=== On the debates between the equality and difference approach ===
With respect to the debates between the equality and difference approach and the United States gender policies, Vogel analyses the positions of each perspective and the policies supported on each side. On the one hand, the equality approach holds that men and women should be treated equally and, therefore, argues that maternity leave should be regulated as any other medical leave, claiming for a job-protected leave available for all temporally disabled workers. On the other hand, the difference approach affirms that special rights are required for women, including a specific protection in their maternity leave, in order to achieve real equality. Vogel argues in favor of transcending this debate, proposing a gender neutrality perspective based on the concept of diversity that combines respect for differences with commitment to equality using gender-neutral legal rules. The idea is that in a diverse society, in which different individuals or groups have special needs and responsibilities, equality is compatible with special accommodations, but this should not be reduced to gender difference.

== Impact and criticisms ==
According to Ferguson and McNally, the only significant scholar response to the first edition of Marxism and the Oppression of Women, which is Lise Vogel's most important book, was written by the socialist feminist Johanna Brenner. Brenner, while recognizing the value of Vogel's work, asserts that the social reproduction perspective fails to explain men's systematic resistance to equality and doesn't address the question of why the outcome of class struggle seems to almost universally result in a family system with men in power. She also remarks that her approach, to a certain degree, ignores the conflict between men and women's interests as well as the power relations between working-class men and women.

Another author who criticized not specifically Vogel's work but the social reproduction approach is Himani Bannerji. Bannerji adverts that, due to its great influence from structuralism, this perspective is unable to understand the role of political subjectivity. What she means is that by paying attention to the existing structures of society, social reproduction feminists leave unexplored the processes through which these structures came to be the way they are, losing the sense of history. Moreover, she claims that due to their economistic reading of Marx's Capital and also as a result of their tendency to abstraction, marxist-feminists don't pay enough attention to race and ethnicity. They ignore "the specificity of differential exploitation that actually exists in an economic organization" and, she continues, "not even functionally [do] they apply the categories of "race" and ethnicity and attend to practices of racism to augment their understanding of capital".

While the first edition of Marxism and the Oppression of Women, in 1983, made almost no impact, after thirty years, the second edition of the book (2013) had a very different reception. Since the publication of the second edition five years ago, Lise Vogel has been invited to give talks all over the world, the book has had many reviews, it had already been published in Turkish and Chinese but the second edition was also translated to German and Turkish and new translations are underway. According to Ferguson and McNally, if Vogel's work didn't initially get the attention it deserved is because it "appeared at a moment of acute disarray for the socialist-feminist movement […] [with] neoliberalism in the political sphere and postmodern theory in the intellectual realm". In contrast, new anti-capitalist movements are emerging today and the interest on marxist theory is growing again at the moment. That is the reason why Marxism and the Oppression of Women has made an impact only after so many years.

== Bibliography ==
=== Books ===
- Marxism and the Oppression of Women: Toward a Unitary Theory. Brill/Haymarket, 2013 (expanded from the 1983 edition). Translated into Chinese (2009), Turkish (2015), German (in press)
- Woman Questions: Essays for a Materialist Feminism. Routledge and Pluto Press, 1995
- Mothers on the Job: Maternity Policy in the U.S. Workplace. Rutgers University Press, 1993
- Marxism and the Oppression of Women: Toward a Unitary Theory. Rutgers University Press, 1983; pb., 1987; Pluto Press, 1984
- The Column of Antoninus Pius. Loeb Classical Monographs. Cambridge: Harvard University Press, 1973

=== List of selected articles ===
- "Beyond Intersectionality" Science & Society, April 2018
- "Preface" Social Reproduction Theory, ed. Tithi Bhattacharya, Pluto Press, 2017
- "Introduction" (with Martha Gimenez) Special Issue on "Marxist-Feminist Thought Today," Science & Society, January 2005
- "Introduction" (and editor) review symposium on Red Feminism, by Kate Weigand, in Science & Society, Winter 2002–2003
- "Hausarbeitsdebatte" [Domestic Labor Debate], in vol.5 of Historisch-Kritisches Woerterbuch des Marxismus, ed. Wolfgang Fritz Haug, Berlin: INKRIT, 2002
- "Domestic Labor Revisited" Science & Society, Summer 2000 Anthologized in Feminist Interpretations of Marx, ed. Christine Di Stefano, Pennsylvania State University Press, forthcoming
- "From the Woman Question to Women's Liberation" in Materialist Feminism, ed. R.Hennessy and C.Ingraham, Routledge, 1997
- "Engels’s Origin: Legacy, Burden, and Vision" in Engels Today, ed. C. Arthur, Macmillan, 1996
- "Considering Difference: The Case of the U.S. Family and Medical Leave Act of 1993" Social Politics, Spring 1995
- "Telling Tales: Historians of Our Own Lives" Journal of Women's History, Spring 1991
- "Debating Difference: Feminism, Pregnancy, and the Workplace" Feminist Studies, Spring 1990
- "Socialist Feminism" Encyclopedia of the American Left, Garland, 1990; rev.ed., Oxford, 1998
- "Questions on the Woman Question" Monthly Review, June 1979 Translated: Monthly Review, edizione italiana, July–August 1979; Revista Mensual, November 1979; Pensamiento Critico, March–April 1980; Meniaia Epitheorese, July 1980
- "«Humorous Incidents and Sound Common Sense»: More on the New England Mill Women" Labor History, Spring 1978
- "«Hearts to Feel and Tongues to Speak»: New England Mill Women in the Early Nineteenth Century" in Class, Sex, and the Woman Worker, ed. M. Cantor and B. Laurie, Greenwood, 1977; pb. 1985
- "«Their Own Work»: Two Documents from the Nineteenth-Century Labor Movement" Signs, Spring 1976
- "Fine Arts and Feminism: The Awakening Consciousness" Feminist Studies, 1974. Anthologized in Feminist Art Criticism, ed. A. Raven, et al., UMI Research Press, 1988; HarperCollins, 1991
- "Modernism and History" New Literary History, Fall 1971(with L.S. Robinson)
- "Circus Race Scenes in the Early Roman Empire" Art Bulletin, June 1969
- "Flexibility versus Formalism" Art Journal, Spring 1968
