= Feminist art criticism =

Feminist criticism

Feminist art criticism emerged in the 1970s from the wider feminist movement as the critical examination of both visual representations of women in art and art produced by women. It continues to be a major field of art criticism.

== Emergence ==
Linda Nochlin's 1971 groundbreaking essay, "Why Have There Been No Great Women Artists?", analyzes the embedded privilege in the predominantly white, male, Western art world and argued that women's outsider status allowed them a unique viewpoint to not only critique women's position in art, but to additionally examine the discipline's underlying assumptions about gender and ability. Nochlin's essay develops the argument that both formal and social education restricted artistic development to men, preventing women (with rare exception) from honing their talents and gaining entry into the art world. In the 1970s, feminist art criticism continued this critique of the institutionalized sexism of art history, art museums, and galleries, as well as questioning which genres of art were deemed museum-worthy. This position is articulated by artist Judy Chicago: "...it is crucial to understand that one of the ways in which the importance of male experience is conveyed is through the art objects that are exhibited and preserved in our museums. Whereas men experience presence in our art institutions, women experience primarily absence, except in images that do not necessarily reflect women's own sense of themselves." In 1996 Catherine de Zegher curated the groundbreaking show of women artists Inside the Visible, that travelled from the ICA Boston to the Whitechapel in London, using the theoretical paradigmatic shift by the artist, philosopher and psychoanalyst Bracha L. Ettinger: the matrixial gaze, space and sphere. Bracha L. Ettinger wrote the introductory theoretical framework, art historian Griselda Pollock contextualised Ettinger's theory and de C. Zegher's curatorial project, in what became since then a cornerstone in feminist art history. In 2000, C. de Zegher organised a conference to look at Linda Nochlin's challenging question thirty years after. Highly significant female curators of the time, like Griselda Pollock, Lisa Tickner, Molly Nesbit, Ann Wagner, Emily Apter, Carol Armstrong and others presented the feminist art criticism in whose origin and revolution they took active part. Following this, Griselda Pollock published her Virtual Feminist Museum book (2007).

=== Genius ===
Nochlin challenges the myth of the Great Artist as 'Genius' as an inherently problematic construct. 'Genius' “is thought of as an atemporal and mysterious power somehow embedded in the person of the Great Artist.” This ‘god-like’ conception of the artist's role is due to "the entire romantic, elitist, individual-glorifying, and monograph-producing substructure upon which the profession of art history is based." She develops this further by arguing that "if women had the golden nugget of artistic genius, it would reveal itself. But it has never revealed itself. Q.E.D. Women do not have the golden nugget of artistic genius." Nochlin deconstructs the myth of the 'Genius' by highlighting the unjustness in which the Western art world inherently privileges certain predominantly white male artists. In Western art, ‘Genius’ is a title that is generally reserved for artists such as, van Gogh, Picasso, Raphael, and Pollock—all white men. As recently demonstrated by Alessandro Giardino, when the concept of artistic genius started collapsing, women and marginal groups emerged at the forefront of artistic creation. Griselda Pollock, following closely the psychoanalytical discoveries of French theorists Julia Kristeva, Luce Irigaray and mainly Bracha L. Ettinger consistently brought the feminist psychoanalytic perspective into the field of art history.

=== Museum organizations ===
Similar to Nochlins’ assertions on women's position in the art world, art historian Carol Duncan in the 1989 article, “The MoMA Hot Mamas”, examines the idea that institutions like the MoMA are masculinized. In MoMA's collection, there is a disproportionate amount of sexualized female bodies by male artists on display compared to a low percentage of actual women artists included. According to data accumulated by the Guerrilla Girls, “less than 3% of the artists in the Modern Art section of New York’s Metropolitan Museum of Art are women, but 83% of the nudes are female”, even though “51% of visual artists today are women.” Duncan claims that, in regards to women artists:

In the MoMA and other museums, their numbers are kept well below the point where they might effectively dilute its masculinity. The female presence is necessary only in the form of imagery. Of course, men, too, are occasionally represented. Unlike women, who are seen primarily as sexually accessible bodies, men are portrayed as physically and mentally active beings who creatively shape their world and ponder its meanings.

This article narrows its focus on one institution to use as an example to draw from and expand on. Ultimately to illustrate the ways in which institutions are complicit in patriarchal and racist ideologies.

=== Intersectionality ===
Women of color in art were often not addressed in earlier feminist art criticism. Intersectional analysis is essential to discuss social categorizations, such as race, class, gender, sexual identity, and disability.

Audre Lorde’s 1984 essay “The Master’s Tools Will Never Dismantle The Master’s House,” briefly addresses a vital dilemma that artists who are women of color are often overlooked or tokenized in the visual arts. She argues that "in academic feminist circles, the answer to these questions is often, ‘We did not know who to ask.’ But that is the same evasion of responsibility, the same cop-out, that keeps Black women's art out of women's exhibitions, Black women's work out of most feminist publications except for the occasional ‘Special Third World Women's Issue,’ and Black women's texts off your reading lists.” Lorde’s statement brings up how important it is to consider intersectionality in these feminist art discourses, as race is just as integral to any discussion on gender.

Furthermore, bell hooks expands on the discourse of black representation in the visual arts to include other factors. In her 1995 book, Art on My Mind, hooks positions her writings on the visual politics of both race and class in the art world. She states that the reason art is rendered meaningless in the lives of most black people is not solely due to the lack of representation, but also because of an entrenched colonization of the mind and imagination and how it is intertwined with the process of identification. Thus she stresses for a “shift [in] conventional ways of thinking about the function of art. There must be a revolution in the way we see, the way we look," emphasizing how visual art has the potential to be an empowering force within the black community. Especially if one can break free from "imperialist white-supremacist notions of the way art should look and function in society."

== Intersection with other schools of thought ==
Feminist art criticism is a smaller subgroup in the larger realm of feminist theory, because feminist theory seeks to explore the themes of discrimination, sexual objectification, oppression, patriarchy, and stereotyping, feminist art criticism attempts similar exploration.

This exploration can be accomplished through a variety of means. Structuralist theories, deconstructionist thought, psychoanalysis, queer analysis, and semiotic interpretations can be used to further comprehend gender symbolism and representation in artistic works. The social structures regarding gender that influence a piece can be understood through interpretations based on stylistic influences and biographical interpretations.

=== Freudian Psychoanalytic Theory ===
Laura Mulvey's 1975 essay, "Visual Pleasure and Narrative Cinema" focuses on the gaze of the spectator from a Freudian perspective. Freud's concept of scopophilia relates to the objectification of women in art works. The gaze of the viewer is, in essence, a sexually charged instinct. Because of the gender inequity that exists in the art sphere, the artist's portrayal of a subject is generally a man's portrayal of women. Other Freudian symbolism can be used to comprehend pieces of art from a feminist perspective—whether gender specific symbols are uncovered through psychoanalytic theory (such as phallic or yonic symbols) or specific symbols are used to represent women in a given piece.

=== Realism and Reflectionism ===
Are the women depicted in an artistic work realistic portrayals of women? Writer Toril Moi explained in her 1985 essay "'Images of Women' Criticism" that "reflectionism posits that the artist's selective creation should be measured against 'real life,' thus assuming that the only constraint on the artist's work is his or her perception of the 'real world.'"

== Journals and publication ==
The 1970s also saw the emergence of feminist art journals, including The Feminist Art Journal in 1972 and Heresies in 1977. The journal n.paradoxa has been dedicated to an international perspective on feminist art since 1996.

Important publications on feminist art criticism include:

- Betterton, Rosemary An Intimate Distance: Women Artists and the Body London, Routledge, 1996.
- Deepwell, Katy ed. New Feminist Art Criticism: Critical Strategies Manchester: Manchester University Press, 1995.
- Ecker, Gisela ed. Feminist Aesthetics London: Women's Press, 1985.
- Frueh, Joanna and C. Langer, A. Raven eds. Feminist Art Criticism: An Anthology Icon and Harper Collins, 1992, 1995.
- Lippard, Lucy From the Center: Feminist Essays on Women's Art New York: Dutton, 1976.
- Lippard, Lucy The Pink Glass Swan: Selected Feminist Essays on Art New York: New Press, 1996.
- Meskimmon, Marsha Women Making Art: History, Subjectivity, Aesthetics (London: Routledge:2003).
- Pollock, Griselda Encounters in the Virtual Feminist Museum: Time, Space and the Archive Routledge, 2007.
- Raven, Arlene Crossing Over: Feminism and the Art of Social Concern USA: Ann Arbor, Michigan: U.M.I.:1988.
- Robinson, Hilary (ed) Feminism - Art - Theory: An Anthology, 1968-2000 Oxford: Blackwells, 2001.

== Beyond the academy ==
In 1989, the Guerilla Girls' poster protest of the Metropolitan Museum of Art's gender imbalance brought this feminist critique out of the academy and into the public sphere.

=== Exhibition ===
In 2007, the exhibit "WACK! Art and the Feminist Revolution" presented works of 120 international artists and artists’ groups at the Museum of Contemporary Art, Los Angeles. It was the first show of its kind that employed a comprehensive view of the intersection between feminism and art from the late 1960s to the early 1980s. WACK! “argues that feminism was perhaps the most influential of any postwar art movement-on an international level-in its impact on subsequent generations of artists.”

== Today ==
Rosemary Betteron's 2003 essay, “Feminist Viewing: Viewing Feminism”, insists that older feminist art criticism must adapt to newer models, as our culture has shifted significantly since the late twentieth century. Betterton points out:

Feminist art criticism is no longer the marginalized discourse that it once was; indeed it had produced some brilliant and engaging writing over the last decade and in many ways has become a key site of academic production. But, as feminist writers and teachers, we need to address ways of thinking through new forms of social engagement between feminism and the visual, and of understanding the different ways in which visual culture is currently inhabited by our students.

According to Betterton, the models used to critique a Pre-Raphaelite painting are not likely to be applicable in the twenty-first century. She also expresses that we should explore ‘difference’ in position and knowledge, since in our contemporary visual culture we are more used to engaging with "multi-layered text and image complexes" (video, digital media, and the Internet). Our ways of viewing have changed considerably since the 1970s.

== See also ==
- Feminist aesthetics
- Feminist art movement
- Guerilla Girls
- Joanna Frueh
- List of feminist art critics
