= Jerri Allyn =

American artist, educator

- Born: Paterson, New Jersey, U.S.
- Known for: Performance art, installation, and video

Jerri Allyn is an American feminist performance, installation artist and educator based in Los Angeles, California.

== Biography ==
Allyn earned an M.A. in Art and Community from Goddard College in 1978 and also attended The Feminist Studio Workshop at the Los Angeles Woman's Building from 1978 to 1978.

Allyn was active in the feminist art movement, co-founding multiple feminist performance groups in the 1970s and 1980s. The first of these was "The Waitresses," co-founded with Anne Gauldin in 1977. All of the members of the group were waitresses, and through their often comedic performances, they explored the cultural perception of women as nurturers as well as what labor conditions were like for women in the service industry. The group performed in restaurants and other public spaces and on one occasion formed The All-City Waitress Marching Band to perform in a parade. Along with Nancy Angelo, Anne Gauldin, Cheri Gaulke and Sue Maberry, Allyn was a founding member of Sisters of Survival (SOS), an anti-nuclear weapons group that sought to bring artists, activists, and citizens together. SOS carried out a project in 1983 called "End of the Rainbow, involving performance events in both the United States and Europe and culminating in an exhibition at Franklin Furnace in New York City from November 20-December 24, 1983.

In her 1977 performance piece "Cancer Madness," Allyn grappled with her mother's cancer, her grandmother's madness, and her own health fears prompted by this family history. She performed in bed in her studio, which she had transformed to look like a hospital. The work was interactive in that viewers came to the space to support Allyn and help her heal. In 1979, Allyn was part of the cast for the performance "An Oral Herstory of Lesbianism," created under the direction of the Lesbian Art Project and described by fellow artist and participant Cheri Gaulke as a work "collaboratively created out of the life stories of 13 lesbians."

Allyn also creates interactive installations that transcend the boundary between art and life and that are integrated into public spaces. She works with whatever medium seems best suited to the situation and the environment and has worked in media as diverse as billboards, artists books, and audio formats. Her interactive sculptural installation, with soundscapes by Helene Rosenbluth, “A Chair is a Throne is a Freedom Fighter’s Camp Stool,” is about resolving conflicts creatively. This work premiered in New York Public Libraries in 2002 and was sponsored by the Lower Manhattan Cultural Council.

She has created two commissioned works for New American Radio, "American Dining: A Working Woman's Moment" (1989), and "Angels Have Been Sent to Me" (1991).

Allyn has previously worked as Director of Education and Public Programs at the Bronx Museum of the Arts, Founding Director of ACT: Artists, Community and Teaching at Otis College of Art and Design, and was the Director of Programs at Venice Arts in Venice, California. She is currently employed by the Center for the Study of Political Graphics.

== Select awards and honors ==
Allyn has received the following grants, residence programs and awards:

- 2002 – Joan Mitchell Foundation grant in the painters and sculptures category
- 1989, 1991 – Media grant, New York State Council on the Arts
- 1986 – Artist in Residence, Yellow Springs Institute, Yellow Springs, Pennsylvania
- 1981, 1985, 1990 – National Endowment for the Arts (N.E.A.)
- Rockefeller Foundation residency at the Study and Conference Center in Bellagio, Italy
- Lila Wallace Reader's Digest residency, in Oaxaca, Mexico
