= Susan E. King =

American artist, educator and writer

- Born: April 5, 1947 (age 78); Lexington, Kentucky, United States
- Education: University of Kentucky (BA); University of New Mexico (MA in art)
- Known for: Artist, author, educator
- Awards: National Museum of Women in the Arts Book Fellowship, 2001; National Endowment for the Arts Small Press Grant; Vesta Award from the Woman's Building
- Website: susankingart.work

Susan E. King (born 1947) is an American artist, educator, and writer who is best known for her artist's books.

== Early life and education ==
King grew up in Kentucky. She received a B.A. degrees in ceramics from University of Kentucky; and a master's degree in art from University of New Mexico.

== Career ==
=== Artist and educator ===
At the University of New Mexico, she taught one of the first Women and Art courses in the U.S. in 1973. For several years she taught letterpress printing at Otis College of Art and Design. She lectures, teaches workshops and has been an artist-in-residence at numerous art centers and universities around the U.S.

She came to California to be part of the Feminist Art Program at the Woman's Building, where she held the position of Studio Director of the Women's Graphic Center.

=== Author ===
She publishes books through the Paradise Press imprint and currently divides her time between Kentucky and California. Her books are often memoirs about travel. One of her well-known books, Treading the Maze, An artist's journey through breast cancer, published by Chronicle was created as what she calls "a journey through the land of cancer." King has been written about in The Penland Book of Handmade Books: Master Classes in Bookmaking Techniques, representing master craftsmen at the Penland School of Crafts.

A National Endowment for the Arts grant was awarded to a collaborative team with Sheila Levrant de Bretteville and Bettye Saar. She was awarded a book production grant from the Women's Studio Workshop and the Visual Studies Workshop in 1984. She also won a book production grant from Nexus Press. In 2000, she was awarded the Early Times Scholarship Travel Grant from the Kentucky Arts and Craft Foundation. She was awarded a book fellowship in 2001 from the National Museum of Women in the Arts. She was awarded a Small Press Grant from the National Endowment for the Arts.

Her artist books are included in the collections of major libraries, like those at Harvard University, and the Getty Research Library. They are also among the collections of the Museum of Modern Art, New York, the Victoria and Albert Museum London, Brooklyn Museum of Art, and Otis College of Art and Design Library in Los Angeles.

== Exhibitions ==
- "Paradise Meets Purgatory The Watson Library," the Metropolitan Museum of Art, 1986
- "Books Without Bounds," Irvine Fine Arts Center, 1987
- "Unseen Hands: Women printers, Binders and Book Designers," Princeton University Library, 2002
- "The Artist Turns to the Book," Getty Research Institute, The Getty Museum, 2005
- 30 years of Innovation: A Survey of Exhibition History at the Center for Book Arts, 1974–2004 / organized by Jae Jennifer Rossman, guest curator, April 15 through July 1, 2005.
- "Doin' It in Public: Feminism and the Art of the Woman's Building," Otis College of Art and Design, Los Angeles, 2011
- Exploding the Codex: The Theater of the Book, San Francisco Center for the Book, June 1 - August 31, 2012.
- "Chapters: Book Arts in Southern California," Craft and Folk Art Museum, Los Angeles, CA 2017
- Binding Desire: Unfolding Artists Books
