= Cheri Gaulke =

American artist

- Born: 1954 (age 71–72); St. Louis, Missouri
- Known for: Performance art, film and video, public art, and artists' books
- Awards: Art as a Hammer Award from Center for the Study of Political Graphics, 2013; Vesta Award from the Woman's Building, 1986; Fellowship for Visual Artists from California Community Foundation; Veteran Feminists of America, 2013
- Website: http://cherigaulke.com

Cheri Gaulke (born 1954) is a visual artist and filmmaker most known for her role in the Feminist Art Movement in southern California in the 1970s and her work on gay and lesbian families.

== Early life and education ==
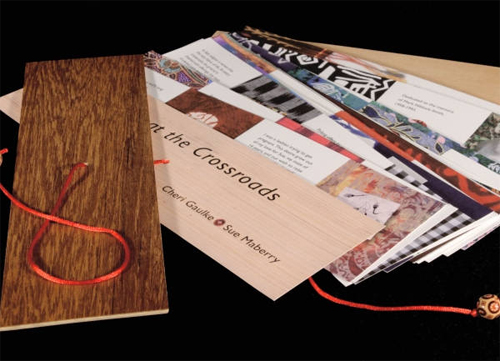
Artists' Book by Cheri Gaulke and Sue Maberry called Offerings at the Crossroads, 2006.

Gaulke holds a Bachelor of Fine Arts degree from Minneapolis College of Art and Design and a Master of Arts degree (in Feminist Art/Education) from Goddard College. In 1975, she moved to Los Angeles and became involved with the Feminist Studio Workshop at the Woman's Building.

At the Feminist Studio Workshop, Gaulke studied with Suzanne Lacy and focused primarily on performance art. There she created a character she called Cinderella, who Gaulke describes as not conforming to any specific sex or gender role and thus "in a constant state of transformation."

In addition to her solo work, Gaulke collaborated with Anne Gauldin to produce The Malta Project, in which the two performed rites related to female spirituality at prehistoric temples throughout Malta.

== Career ==
Gaulke has been a co-founder of two collaborative feminist performance groups: Feminist Art Workers (1976–81), co-founded with Nancy Angelo, Candace Compton, Vanalyne Green, and Laurel Klick, and Sisters of Survival (SOS), co-founded in 1981 with Nancy Angelo, Jerri Allyn, Anne Gauldin, and Sue Maberry.

Gaulke's last performance was in 1992 at Highways Performance, Santa Monica. Though Gaulke has moved away from performance, the feminist art strategies that she helped to innovate in the 1970s in southern California continue in her work. Her art continues to be a vehicle for social commentary and as a way to tell the stories of individuals and groups under-represented in society. She works in a variety of media, but mostly video, installation art, artists' books, and public art. Such projects have included a video in collaboration with lesbian and gay teens, a photographic wall installation about lesbian and gay families, a video installation with Latino teenagers about the L.A. River, and a video installation about kids’ perspectives on a river in North Carolina. With her partner, Sue Maberry, Gaulke explored their relationship through the documentation series "Thicker than Blood: Our Lesbian Family" (1992). In an extension of this work, they later invited gay and lesbian parents with children to take traditional family portraits at Sears portrait studio, and to write about what family and marriage meant to them, particularly before the legalization of gay marriage in the United States. This later work manifested in the installation "Families Next Door" (1995) and the artist's book "Marriage Matters" (2005).

Gaulke has completed three public art projects;- a Metro-Rail Station in Los Angeles that tells stories about an oft ignored urban river, an outdoor sculptural piece for a library in Lake View Terrace, and three stainless steel and glass glowing “Pillars of Community” for the City of Lakewood, California. A black granite memorial honoring the service of Filipino World War II veterans was dedicated on November 11, 2006, in a park in Historic Filipinotown, Los Angeles, the first such monument in the U.S.

In 1991 Gaulke was an Artist Book Resident at Women's Studio Workshop in Rosendale, NY. While a resident, Gaulke published Impedement, a handmade artist's book that investigates the abuse of women's footwear and feet through the ages, from ancient Chinese foot binding to high heeled shoes of the present. Personal and historical narratives illustrate the results of cultures’ persisting foot fetish. Nested within the book is a pop-up which presents the reader with a packet of “seeds” for change. Impedement was published as an edition of 200.

Gaulke has received grants from the National Endowment for the Arts, the California Arts Council, the City of Los Angeles Cultural Affairs Department, and the Brody Arts Fund. She has exhibited her work in numerous formats all over the world, including exhibitions at the Los Angeles Art Association (LAAA) and Museum of Modern Art as well as on buses and in churches. Gaulke's 2013 video Cycle of the Witch, which explores the development of her identity from her childhood as a Midwestern minister's daughter to her adulthood as a lesbian feminist artist living in Los Angeles, was screened at the 'Tapping the Third Realm' exhibition at the Otis College of Art and Design and at Loyola Marymount University in 2013. Her 2016 video 'I Am Be,' which retells the myth of Demeter and Persephone to explore the theme of sexual violence, was screened at the Harvard Westlake School in 2016.

In 1986 Gaulke received the Vesta Award from the Los Angeles Woman's Building for Contributions to Performance Art, and she was honored with a mid-career fellowship from the Cultural Affairs Department (COLA grant) in 2004–05. In 2013, she received the Art as a Hammer Award from the Center for the Study of Political Graphics.

== Selected works ==
- Gaulke, Cheri. Offerings at the Crossroads. California: Cheri Gaulke, 2005.
- Gaulke, Cheri; Maberry, Sue. Marriage Matters. Los Angeles, CA: Cheri Gaulke, 2005.
- Gaulke, Cheri. Frogskin. Los Angeles, CA: Cheri Gaulke, 2005.

== Film/video work ==
- Gloria's Call (2018) is a short documentary about emeritus USC professor, Gloria Orenstein and her relationships with surrealist women artists including Leonora Carrington. It has won numerous awards at film festivals, including the Ann Arbor Film Festival and the Newport Beach Film Festival. Miriam Cutler composed the film's music.
- Cycle of the Witch, 2013, 12 minutes. This was created for the exhibition Tapping the Third Realm, curated by Meg Linton and Carolyn Peter, Otis College of Art and Design and Loyola Marymount University, September 22 – December 8, 2013.
- Miss Alma Thomas: A Life in Color, a documentary about the artist Alma Thomas, headlined the Homegrown Showcase of the 2021 DC Shorts Film Festival. Featuring Alfre Woodard as the voice of Thomas, the film was also selected for the Thomas Edison Film Festival, where Gaulke won the Edison Innovation Award.
- Inside the Beauty Bubble, co-created with Cheryl Bookout, is a documentary about Jeff Hafler, owner of the Beauty Bubble Salon and Museum in Joshua Tree, California. It has been screened at the Frameline Film Festival and won audience awards at Dances With Films and the San Luis Obispo International Film Festival in 2022.

== Bibliography ==
- Payne, R. "Shoe Fetish" (review) Artweek v. 20 (December 21, 1989) p. 11-12
- Apple, J. "Circus Moon"(Performance Review, Laguna Art Museum, California). High Performance v. 12 (Spring 1989) p. 68-9
- Geer, S. "Changes of the Moon" (Performance Review, Laguna Art Museum, California). Artweek v. 19 (October 29, 1988) p. 6-7
- "The Function of Art in Culture Today" [90 artists, who have appeared in High Performance, offer short statements]. High Performance v. 11 (Spring/Summer 1988) p. 26-75
- Geer, S. "Stamping on Fertile Ground [Performance Review, Church in Ocean Park, Santa Monica, CA.) Artweek v. 18 (September 26, 1987) p. 8
- Raven, A. (Performance Review, Franklin Furnace, NY). New Art Examiner v. 14 (June 1987) p. 61-2
- Burnham, L. F. "Our Lady of L.A." High Performance v. 10 no. 3 (1987) p. 98
- Sandford, M. R. "Cheri Gaulke & Christine Papalexis: Virgin" (Performance Review, Franklin Furnace, NY). High Performance v. 10 no. 2 (1987) p. 72-3
- Lieff, L. "The Postcard Project" [interview]. Heresies v. 6 no. 2 ( [1987]) p. 38-40
- James, D. E. "A Case of Blaspheminism" (Performance Review). Artweek v. 16 (June 1, 1985) p. 7
- Burnham, L. F. "Revelations of the Flesh [Performance Review, Wilshire United Methodist Church, Los Angeles). High Performance v. 8 no. 2 (1985) p. 64-6
- "California Feminists: Cheri Gaulke and Linda Nishio." TDR: The Drama Review 49, no. 1 (2005) p. 50-53
- Wolverton, T. "Taking the Leap (Performance Review, University of California, Los Angeles). Artweek v. 15 (March 31, 1984) p. 9
- Norklun, K. "Body Politic" (Performance Review, Church in Ocean Park, Santa Monica, Calif). Artweek v. 14 (May 14, 1983) p. 9
- Buchanan, N. "Sure-footed Balancing: DTLA." Artweek v. 11 (July 5, 1980) p. 5-6
- Gaulke, C. "Teaching Environmental Art in Los Angeles." Artweek v. 24 (September 23, 1993) p. 24+
- Scoates, C. Afamilyaffair: Gay and Lesbian Issues of Domestic Life (exhibition catalog from Atlanta College of Art Gallery, March 17 – April 30, 1995.
- Brown, B. and A. Raven, Women & Their Art. NewSage Press, 1989.
