= Nancy Angelo =

American organizational psychologist and performance and video artist

- Born: October 8, 1953 (age 72); Carson City, Nevada
- Education: San Francisco Art Institute; California School of Professional Psychology in Los Angeles (PhD in organizational psychology)
- Occupation: Organization Development Services
- Employer: Angelo + Garnets consulting firm
- Known for: Co-founded the collaborative performance art group The Feminist Art Workers in 1976; Co-directed Nun and Deviant, considered by many to be the key text of the feminist video art; Co-founded Sisters of Survival in 1981

Nancy Angelo (born October 8, 1953 in Carson City, Nevada, USA) is an organizational psychologist and formerly a performance and video artist who took part in the feminist art movement in Los Angeles. As an artist, she is best known for co-founding the collaborative performance art group The Feminist Art Workers in 1976 with Candace Compton, Cheri Gaulke, and Laurel Klick.

After studying photography in Denmark and attending San Francisco Art Institute, Angelo moved to Los Angeles in 1975 in order to enroll in the Feminist Studio Workshop at the Woman’s Building. She took an active part in refurbishing the old three-story structure on North Spring Street near Chinatown that housed the Woman’s Building and making it suitable for learning and practicing art.

== Career ==
=== Feminist Art Workers ===
Shortly after enrolling in the FSW, Angelo immersed herself in performance art and in 1976 she co-founded Feminist Art Workers with Cheri Gaulke, Laurel Klick, and Candace Compton (later replaced by Vanalyne Green). In an attempt to mobilize the strategies of feminist education in the field of performance art, the Feminist Art Workers used performance to create an empowering network for women in and outside of Los Angeles. In 1978, FAW created Traffic in Women: A Feminist Vehicle (1978), performed at various sites between Los Angeles and Las Vegas. Prior to embarking on this project, the group conducted research on the subject of prostitution and the actual traffic in women between these two cities. In 1980, FAW embarked on an even more ambitious project, Bill of Rights, which the group performed from 1980 to 1982 in 15 states that have not passed the Equal Rights Amendment at the time. This project emerged on the heels of major demonstration in Washington, D.C., which took place in 1978 when 100,000 marched the streets demanding equal rights. It was just one of many efforts, initiated by feminists across the nation, to ensure the ratification of ERA by 1982.

=== Video art ===
In 1976, Angelo and Compton directed Nun and Deviant, considered by many to be the key text of the feminist video art. By taking on the roles of a nun (Angelo) and a deviant (Compton), the two artists reflected on “prototypical or actual lesbian models.” At this time, Angelo’s experiments in performance art coincided with her involvement with local video production. Thus, during the same year, Angelo, Annette Hunt, Candace Compton, and Jerri Allyn established the Los Angeles Women’s Video Center, located at the Woman’s Building. LWVC supported the work of prominent feminist video-makers such as Cheri Gaulke, Suzanne Lacy, and Vanalyne Green. During the first decade of its existence, some 350 videotapes were produced.

=== Collaborative work ===
In 1979, Angelo took part in An Oral Herstory of Lesbianism, initiated by Terry Wolverton and performed at the Woman’s Building. Apart from Angelo, the event involved many other participants in LA performance art scene: Cheri Gaulke, Jerri Allyn, Leslie Belt, Chutney Gunderson, Brook Hallock, Sue Maberry, Louise Moore, Arlene Raven, Catherine Stifter, Cheryl Swannack, and Christine Wong. At the time, Wolverton was involved with the Lesbian Art Project at the Woman’s Building and she proposed to create Herstory in an effort to “chronicle the lives of lesbians.” The project opened with ten workshops devoted to teaching performance skills and techniques as well as to exploring issues of lesbianism.

During the same year, Angelo and Leslie Labowitz initiated the Incest Awareness Project, a collaboration between Ariadne: A Social Art Network and the Women's Resources Program of the Los Angeles Gay and Lesbian Community Services Center (of which Angelo was a member). The project attracted a large number of feminist artists including Leslie Belt, Jerri Allyn, Paula Lumbard, Bia Lowe, Terry Wolverton, Tyaga, Chris Wong, and many others. As a part of her involvement in the project, Angelo produced and exhibited Equal Time/Equal Space, an interactive multi-monitor video work. Committed to shedding light on violence against women, her project invited open dialogue on the subject of incest at the time when it was not publicly discussed.

In 1981, Angelo co-founded another performance group, Sisters of Survival (SOS) that focused on anti-nuclear issues. The group formed after the dissolution of Feminist Art Workers, when two former FAW members, Gaulke and Angelo, decided to join forces with members of another LA-based group, The Waitresses. The original lineup included Angelo, Gaulke, Jerri Allyn, Anne Gauldin, and Sue Maberry. As a part of their performance, the members of SOS “dressed in nun’s habits of all colors of the rainbow to represent an image of ‘global sisterhood.’”

=== Current work ===
After leaving Sisters of Survival and ending her association with the Woman’s Building, Angelo decided to continue her education and obtain a PhD in organizational psychology from the California School of Professional Psychology in Los Angeles. Currently, she lives in the Bay Area and provides organization development services as a part of Angelo + Garnets consulting firm.

== Bibliography ==
- Cottingham, Laura. Seeing through the Seventies: Essays on Feminism and Art. New York: Routledge, 2003.
- Fuller, Diana Burgess and Daniela Salvioni. Art, Women, California 1950-2000: Parallels and Intersections. Berkeley and Los Angeles: University of California Press, 2002.
- Gaulke, Cheri. “Feminist Art Workers: Bill of Rights.” High Performance 11/12, vol. 3, nos. 3 and 4 (Fall/Winter 1980).
- Lacy, Suzanne. Leaving Art: Writings on Performance, Politics, and Publics, 1974-2007. Durham: Duke University Press, 2010.
- Meyer, Laura. “The Woman’s Building and Los Angeles’ Leading Role in the Feminist Art Movement.” In From Site to Vision: The Woman’s Building in Contemporary Culture, edited by Sondra Hale and Terry Wolverton. Retrieved July 27, 2011 (http://womansbuilding.org/fromsitetovision/pdfs/Meyer.pdf).
- Raven, Arlene. “A Remarkable Conjunction: Feminism and Performance Art.” In Yesterday and Tomorrow: California Women Artists, edited by Sylvia Moore. New York: Midmarch Arts Press, 1989.
- Roth, Moira. The Amazing Decade: Women and Performance Art in America 1970-1980. Los Angeles: Astro Artz, 1983.
- Steinman, Susan Leibovitz. “Compendium.” In Mapping the Terrain: New Genre Public Art, edited by Suzanne Lacy. Seattle: Bay Press, 1995.
- Withers, Josephine. “Feminist Performance Art: Performing, Discovering, Transforming Ourselves.” In The Power of Feminist Art: The American Movement of the 1970s, History and Impact, edited by Norma Broude and Mary D. Garrard. New York: Harry N. Abrams, 1994.
- Wolverton, Terry. Insurgent Muse: Life and Art at the Woman’s Building. San Francisco: City Lights, 2002.
