= Three Weeks in May =

1977 work of performance art and activism by Suzanne Lacy

Three Weeks in May: Speaking Out On Rape, A Political Art Piece
- Every day of the performance Lacy marked a map of Los Angeles with a large red "RAPE" stamp to indicate where rapes had been reported the previous day.
- Artists: Suzanne Lacy, Leslie Labowitz, Jill Soderholm, Melissa Hoffman, Barbara Cohen
- Year: 1977
- Medium: performance
- Location: Hammer Museum

Three Weeks in May: Speaking Out On Rape, A Political Art Piece was an extended work of performance art and activism by Suzanne Lacy. The piece took place in Los Angeles, California from May 8 to May 24, 1977.

== History ==
Lacy designed Three Weeks in May in collaboration with artists Leslie Labowitz, Jill Soderholm, Melissa Hoffman and Barbara Cohen. It was sponsored by the Woman's Building and Studio Watts Workshop. Lacy designed the expanded performance to be a "simultaneous juxtaposition of art and non-art activities within an extended time frame, taking place within the context of popular culture." Lacy had a background in the anti-rape movement. The artists employed a mass media performance as a means to make social change through art with Lacy crediting the theories of her former CalArts professor Allan Kaprow, who coined the term "happening", with informing her art's transition to the public sphere. Media was integral to the performance structure of Three Weeks, both as a means to create a public dialogue about rape and a way to bring disparate nonviolence organizations and ideologies together on a common issue. The media was engaged through press conferences, television programs, and radio talk shows.

The City Mall Shopping Center was chosen as the site of an installation piece due to its proximity to Los Angeles City Hall. Two 25-foot maps of the greater Los Angeles Area were used for Three Weeks. On one of the maps, every day Lacy used a large red "RAPE" stamp to mark locations where rapes from the previous day had been reported. Reports were taken from the Los Angeles Police Department, who assigned an information officer to work with Lacy. The second map included rape hotlines and the locations of rape crisis centers in the United States.

Labowitz organized a performance series addressing rape that was held at lunchtime in the underground City Mall Shopping Center for four consecutive days. She collaborated with different groups for the performances. The Rape was developed in collaboration with Women against Rape, Men against Rape. All Men Are Potential Rapists included two men from the Los Angeles Men's Collective. The performances Myths about Rape and Women Fight Back were done with the help of Woman's Building members.

Lacy created the performance installation She Who Would Fly at Garage Gallery for Three Weeks. Over the course of two afternoons, she invited women to voice their experiences with rape. The women then wrote their experiences on paper that was taped to the location where they were sexually assaulted on one of the maps that covered the walls of the small gallery space. Poet Deena Metzger scrawled a description of her rape on one of the walls. She Who Would Fly was opened to the public for an evening and visitors could enter four at a time and read the stories. A winged lamb carcass was suspended from the ceiling and four performers, each having experienced sexual violence, sat silently above the door, naked and covered in red greasepaint.

Three Weeks also included a performance piece on the steps of Los Angeles City Hall, a rape "speak-out", and self-defense classes for women in an attempt to highlight and curb sexual violence against women.

== Legacy ==
Three Weeks in May prompted the police and the city government to address violence against women openly and to publicize rape hotlines. Lacy and Labowitz continued to collaborate on public art projects, addressing gender violence again that December with their In Mourning and in Rage event. Three Weeks in May was the first of Lacy's large scale public art projects and the strategies that she employed in the piece became characteristic in her later works. In the NWSA Journal, art historian Vivien Green Fryd wrote that Lacy's Three Weeks marked the beginning of New Genre Public Art.

In 2012 Lacy modified Three Weeks in May for the Getty Pacific Standard Time Performance Festival in a new project called Three Weeks in January, which continued the dialogue about rape in Los Angeles. It included presentations, conversations, and a performance called Storytelling Rape. This time the map was installed prominently on the Los Angeles Police Department's main campus. Storying Rape: Shame Ends Here grew into another art project produced for the Liverpool Biennial in 2012, promoting a public conversation in the English city about rape violence, education, and prevention.

In December 2012 the Hammer Museum in Los Angeles acquired Three Weeks in May. This is now the installation's permanent home.

== See also ==
- Mattress Performance (Carry That Weight)
