= The Waitresses (artists) =

American feminist performance art group

The Waitresses were a collaborative feminist performance art group that formed in 1977. The group consisted of artists that also worked as waitresses in Los Angeles, California. The group was active from their inception until 1985.

== History ==
The Waitresses were co-founded at the Woman's Building by Feminist Studio Workshop (FSW) graduates Jerri Allyn and Anne Gauldin in 1977. The two formed the group after Allyn saw Gauldin perform at the FSW, where Gauldin blackened her eyes, served drinks; attempting to convey that the drinks and the role of waitressing was poisonous. Allyn was deeply moved, having been working as a waitress for seven years. Their first performance was Ready to Order? in which Allyn, Gauldin, Patti Nicklaus, Jamie Wildman and Denise Yarfitz participated in. The group eventually grew to 14 people, including Elizabeth Canelake, Anne Mavor, Anita Green, and Chutney Gunderson Berry. The Waitresses performed until 1985. They are credited as a precursor to feminist art advocates the Guerrilla Girls. In 2011, The Waitresses were featured in an exhibition about the Woman's Building, "Doin' It In Public", at Otis College of Art and Design.

== Performance and vision ==
The Waitresses revolved around the exploration of the unity seen within the work waitresses around the world perform. The group focused on four themes: work, money, sexual harassment, and stereotypes of women. They also explored the sexualization of waitresses, as "sex objects, slaves, whores, and women who perform a service." Allyn used her own experience as a waitress to channel the idea of the waitress as a prostitute; making more money in tips from male customers by dressing sexier, and how that experience was universal in waitressing and sexist by concept. The group would also interview waitresses to pull inspiration from their experiences.

Ready to Order?, the group's first performance, involved a sexually provocative waitress earning a big tip. The piece was a part of a 7-day, site specific conceptual work conceived by Jerri Allyn, and was performed during business hours at a local Los Angeles restaurant. For their guerilla performances, the artists created playful and provocative characters such as Wonder Waitress, "who helps the harried and hassled waitresses of the world," and the many-breasted Great Goddess Diana, a critique of the nurturing role expected of waitresses. Beyond addressing sexism, the Waitresses delved into global issues around food production and waste in pieces such as One Plate, One Planet (1981), while Wonder Waitress Takes a Look at the Union (1979) focused on organized labor in the restaurant industry.

In 1979 The Waitresses, consisting of 35 participants, marched in the Pasadena Doo Dah Parade as the "All City Waitress Marching Band." The group marched wearing waitressing uniforms, led by a bandleader, the band members performed an original piece based on the song "McNamara's Band", playing pots, pans and cooking tools instead of traditional instruments. In 2007 Allyn, Gauldin, Anne Mavor, Denise Yarfitz Pierre and 37 women, men, and children marched in the Doo Dah Parade again, as the All City Waitress Marching Band, marching in support of pay equity.

=== Notable performances ===
- The All American Waitress Radio Show; Pacifica Radio
- The All City Waitress Marching Band; Doo Dah Parade

== Bibliography ==
- Montano, Linda M. Performance Artists Talking in the Eighties. Berkeley: University of California Press (2000). ISBN 0-520-21022-0
