= Jewel block =

Sailing ships

A jewel block is a block on sailing ships through which the halliard is rove.

It is a single 7-inch block that is suspended from an eyebolt at the yardarm. It is the preferred term for the "studdingsail halliard block".
