= In Mourning and in Rage =

1977 Performance Art Piece

- Artist: Suzanne Lacy and Leslie Labowitz
- Year: 1977
- Medium: Media Performance

In Mourning and in Rage was a work of performance art and activism by Suzanne Lacy and Leslie Labowitz. The performance took place in Los Angeles, California in 1977 as a response to the rapes and murders covered by the media in the "Hillside Strangler" case."As if the horror of these crimes wasn't enough, the press coverage of the events sensationalized the sexual nature of the crimes. For feminist activists in Los Angeles involved in the movement to end violence against women, this analysis was unacceptable."

A continuation of Three Weeks in May, Lacy and Labowitz designed In Mourning and in Rage as a personal response to the sensationalized media coverage of violence against women as well as an expression of grief and rage towards the loss of life. The performance was a collaboration between Lacy, Labowitz, Bia Lowe, Holly Near, City Councilwoman Pat Russel, the Woman's Building, Women Against Violence Against Women, and Los Angeles Commission on Assaults Against Women. The event was staged for mass media coverage at the Los Angeles City Hall.

The performance consisted of a large funeral motorcade of black-clad women led by a hearse from the Woman's Building to the Los Angeles City Hall. Once there, nine seven-feet-tall women draped in black emerged from the hearse along with a woman dressed in red. The mourners then climbed the steps of city hall where each of the nine women gave a statement into a microphone expressing their solidarity with the murdered women, emphasized by a chorus of "In memory of our sisters, we fight back!" from the rest of the motorcade. By making this performance public as well as highly crafted for media coverage, Lacy and Labowitz looked to highlight not only the deaths of the ten women killed by the Hillside Strangler, but the significantly larger population of women victims whose stories went uncovered by mainstream media.

The piece concluded with direct statements to the press explaining the rationale for the piece as well as a speech demanding resources for women's self defense. Singer-songwriter Holly Near performed her song "Fight Back" which was written specifically for this event.

== Legacy ==
In Mourning and in Rage was highly covered by the press and resulted in increased support from Los Angeles City Council members and a pledge from the Rape Hotline Alliance to provide self defense classes.

To further the conversation about social action and art, Lacy and Labowitz produced a video documenting In Mourning and in Rage as well as a pamphlet entitled What is Social Art?.

== See also ==
- Three Weeks in May
- In Mourning and In Rage Video Documentation
