= Leslie Labowitz-Starus =

American performance artist and urban farmer

- Born: August 28, 1946 (age 80); Uniontown, Pennsylvania, U.S.
- Education: Otis College of Art and Design
- Notable work: Three Weeks in May (1977)

Leslie Labowitz-Starus is an American performance artist and urban farmer based in Los Angeles.

Leslie Labowitz-Starus' work is in the permanent collection of the Hammer Museum and has been included in exhibitions at the Museum of Contemporary Art, Los Angeles, and the Getty Museum.

== Background and education ==
Born on August 28, 1946, in Uniontown, Pennsylvania, Labowitz-Starus is the daughter of an Auschwitz survivor. She earned her MFA from Otis in 1972, then moved to Düsseldorf, Germany, as a Fulbright Scholar. In Düsseldorf, Labowitz-Starus attended the Kunstakademie Düsseldorf where she briefly interacted with Joseph Beuys (he was dismissed from his position the semester she arrived).

== Performance Art, 1977-1980 ==
When she returned to Los Angeles in 1977, Labowitz-Starus worked at the Woman's Building, a cultural center just east of Chinatown in downtown Los Angeles devoted to feminist art and cultural change.

From 1977 to 1980, Labowitz-Starus and Suzanne Lacy collaborated on a series of large-scale performances that often took place in public settings. Their first collaboration was In Mourning and in Rage. Together they founded ARIADNE: A Social Art Network, a support system for women artists. In 1977, Labowitz-Starus and Lacy created Three Weeks in May, an extended performance work designed to increase visibility and start conversations about sexual violence against women. Created in response to the Hillside Strangler murders in Los Angeles, the 21-day project involved more than 30 events, including demonstrations, news media interviews, and self-defense classes. One documented performance event which was a part of this project was "In Mourning and In Rage". The artists updated a map with reports from the Los Angeles Police Department, printing the word "rape" on spots on a map of the greater Los Angeles area wherever a rape was reported. This performance art activist piece took place on the steps of Los Angeles City Hall and garnered major media attention.

In November 1978, Labowitz-Starus and Lacy organized a Take Back the Night march in San Francisco that attracted 3,000 participants. Marchers walked arched alongside a two-sided float with a Madonna on one side (which Labowitz-Starus created) and a skinned lamb on the other side (created by Lacy).

In 1979 Labowitz performed "Record Companies Drag Their Feet", a feminist analysis of music album covers.

== Sproutime and Sprout Installations, 1979-1992 ==
Starting in 1979 Labowitz-Starus increasingly began to think of growing sprouts by the terms of performance art. In the early 1980s, Labowitz-Starus created two ephemeral installations in New York City with the walls covered in sprouts. The artist began to grow and sell sprouts at local farmers markets. Labowitz-Starus decided to educate herself about business, learned bookkeeping, hired employees and by 1987, her company Sproutime grew 3,000 pounds of 50 varieties of lettuce and 25 spicy salad. After several years of working from her back yard in Venice, she bought a farm in a residential/agricultural area of Canoga Park. Between 1988 and 1992, Sproutime grew at a rate of 20 percent a year. Labowitz-Starus regularly employs artists, and considers Sproutime to be a work of interactive art whose participants include her co-workers and her customers.

== Pacific Time Installation, 2012 ==
In 2012 as part of the Getty Foundation funded Pacific Standard Time initiative, Labowitz-Starus and Lacy invited Elana Mann and Audrey Chan to re-perform "Myths of Rape."
