= Cranked eye bolt =

Eye bolt used in building construction

A cranked eye bolt is an eye bolt typically used as a structural tie down in building construction where the eye of the bolt must be fastened to a point that cannot be directly below where the shaft would otherwise be fastened. This often occurs where a bearer must be tied down to a post or column but the bearer cannot be directly fastened to the post of column.

It has a shaft which is cranked, or bent twice: once off center, and a second time to bring the shaft back parallel to the original shaft.

== Uses ==
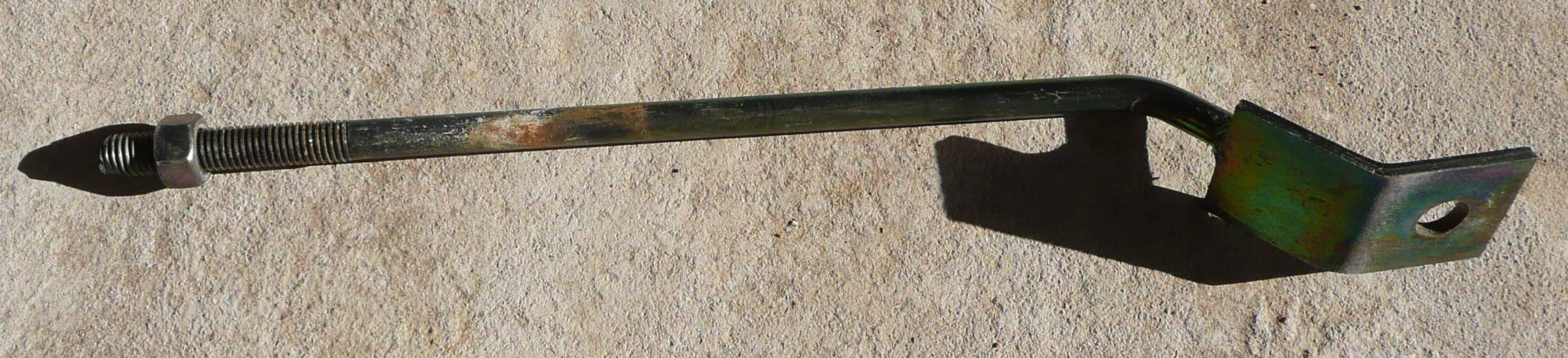
Welded eye shallow cranked eye bolt in profile

The requirement for an offset tie down will occur when vermin proofing must be placed between the column or post, and a wooden bearer, for example to stop termites travelling up through a concrete or wooden post or column directly into the bearer and the rest of the building. The "ant capping", typically a 0.5mm to 0.8mm thick galvanised steel sheet, must be placed between the post and the bearer overlapping the perimeter of the post by approximately 20mm to 40mm or more. The cranked eye bolt is fastened to the post using a bolt through the eye, the crank in the shaft allowing the shaft to be positioned so that it does not impede the overlap of the "ant capping" up through the bearer.

Should termite attack occur, the post of column can be replaced with no structural effect to the building.

Cranked eye bolts can also be used to tie the top plate of a house frame directly to house supports, using rod couplers and steel extension rods.

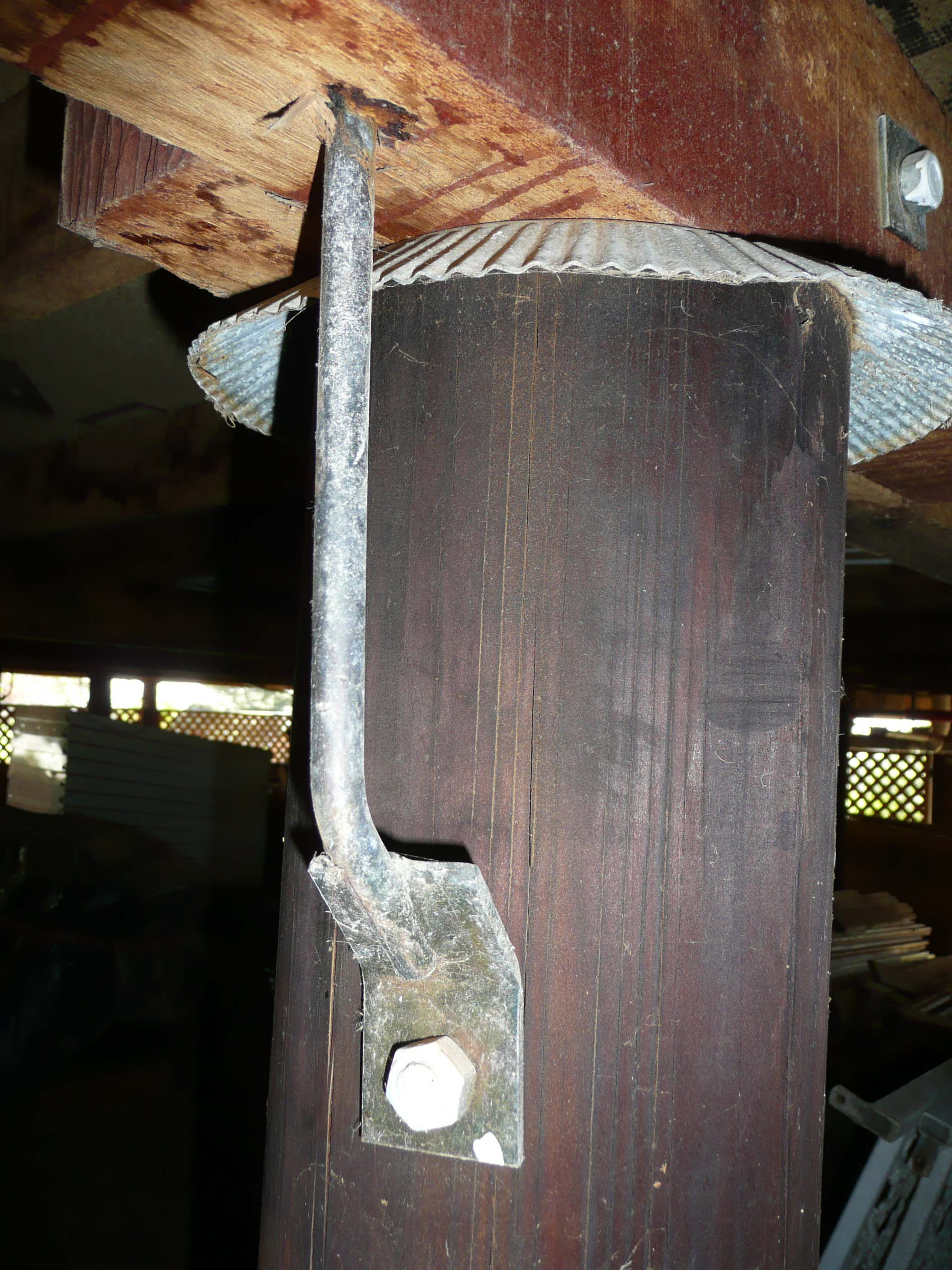
Welded eye cranked bolt tying down bearer

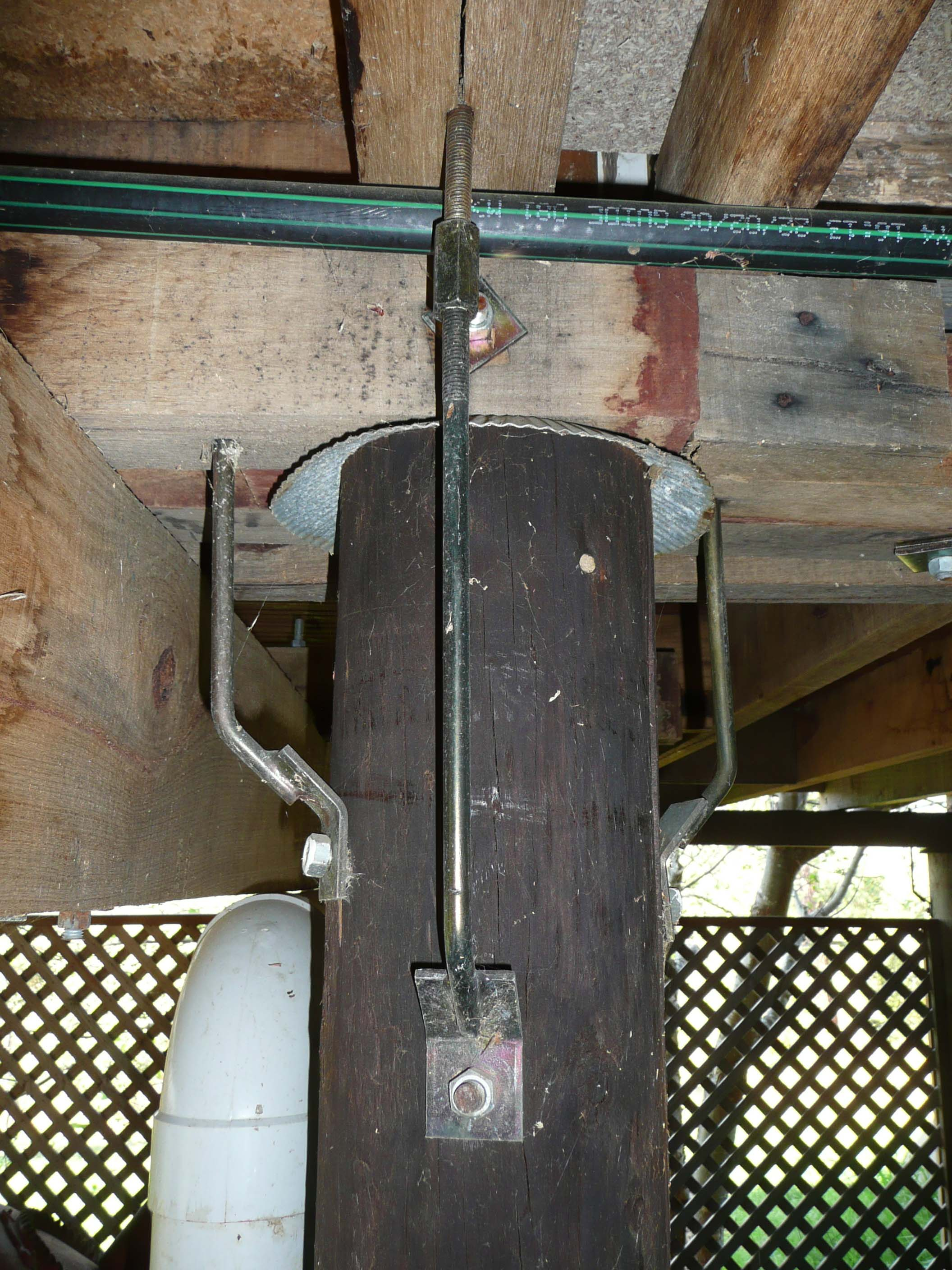
Welded eye cranked bolt with coupling rod to (not shown) frame pitching plate and top plate

== Engineering ==
Cranked eye bolts used to be made by bending an "eye" into the end of a rod that was threaded at the other end.

Today, cranked eye bolts are now typically made by welding a cranked and threaded rod to a heavy gauge steel washer.

Cranked eye bolts are made with different degrees of crank and lengths of shaft for flexibility.

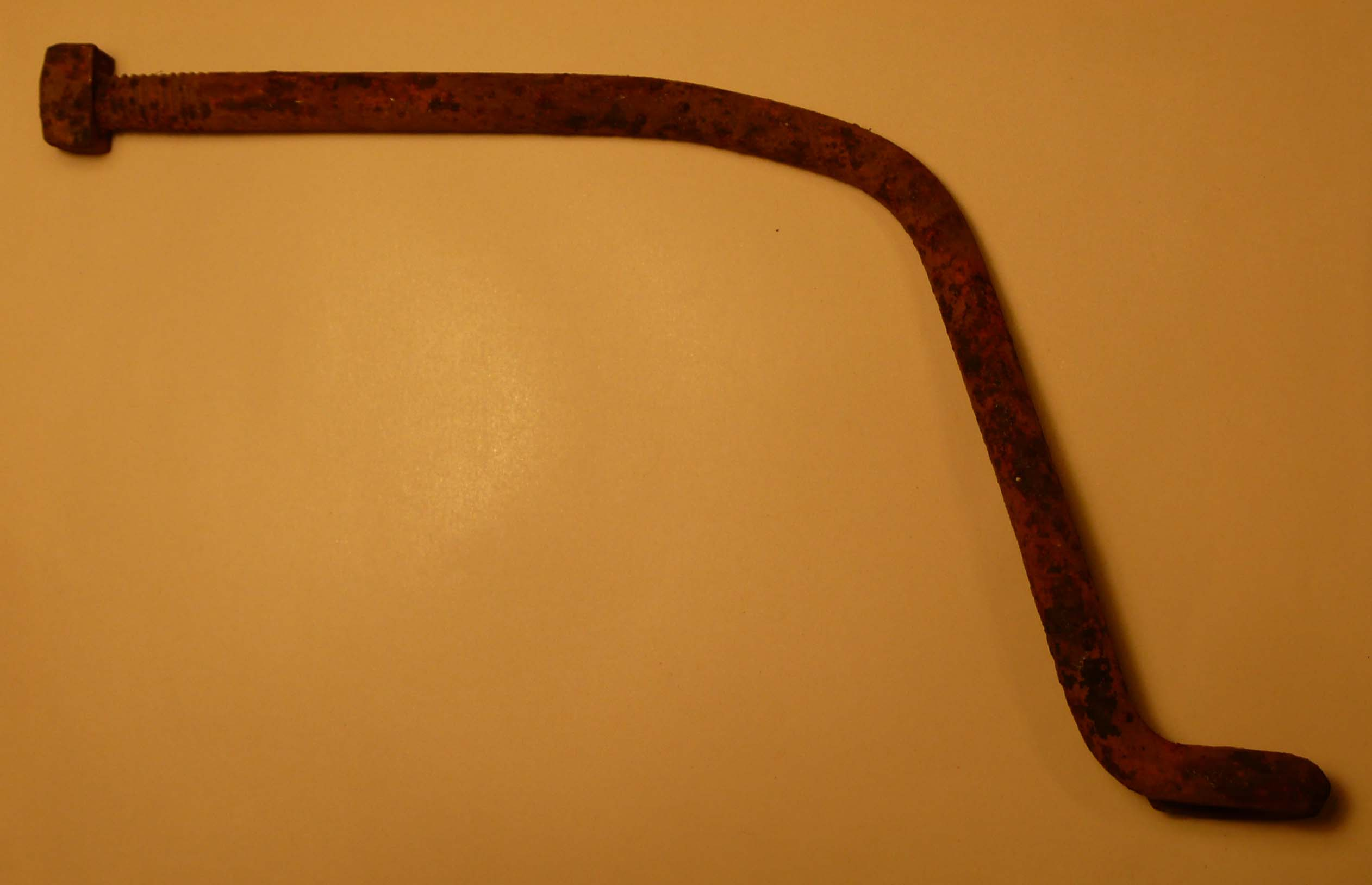
Bent eye cranked eye bolt in profile

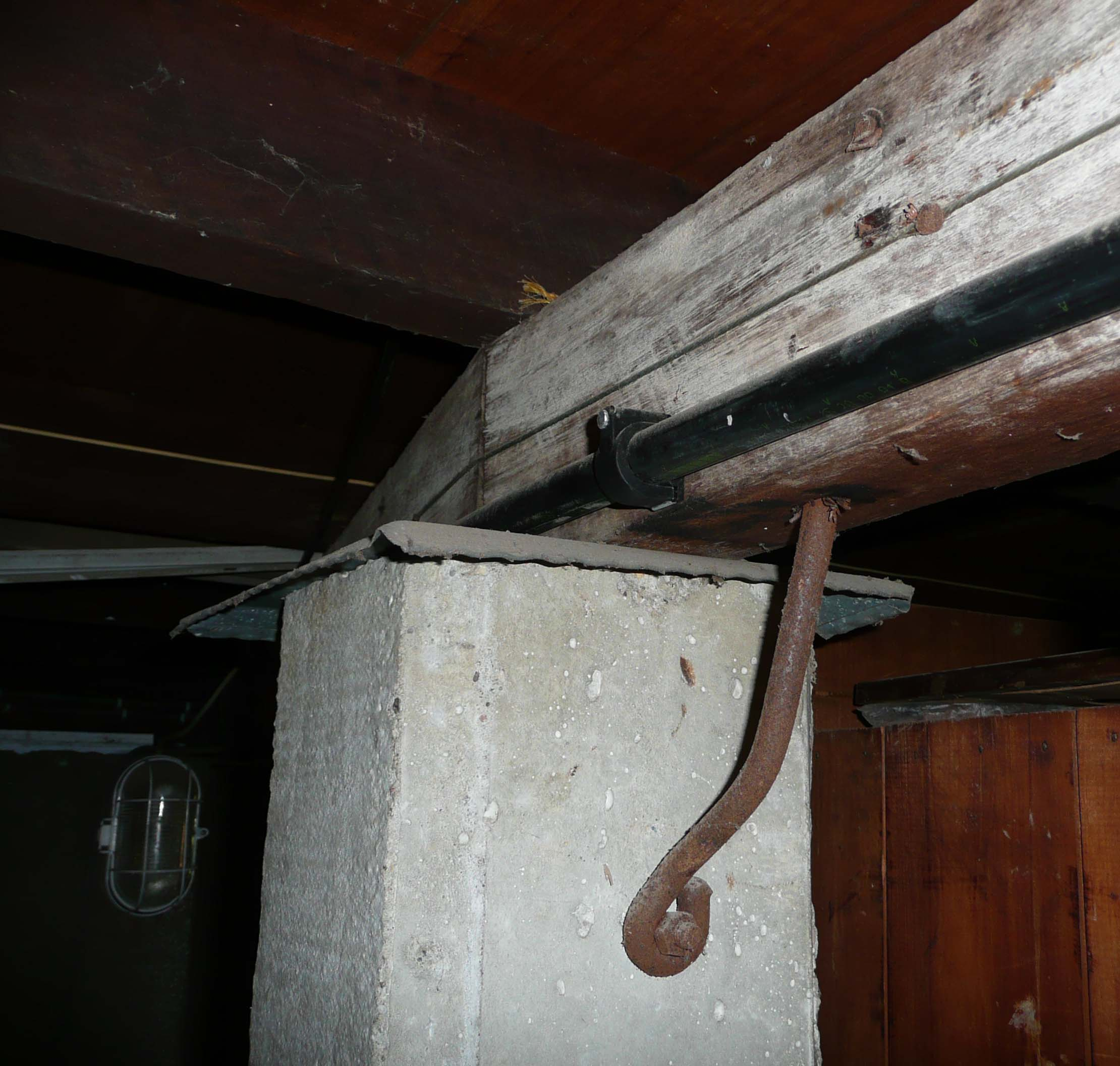
Bent eye cranked eye bolt in situ
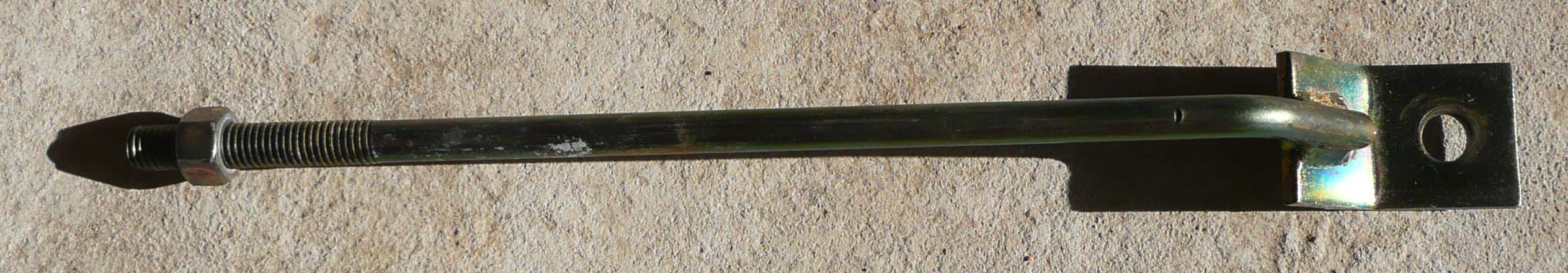
Welded eye shallow cranked eye bolt in portrait

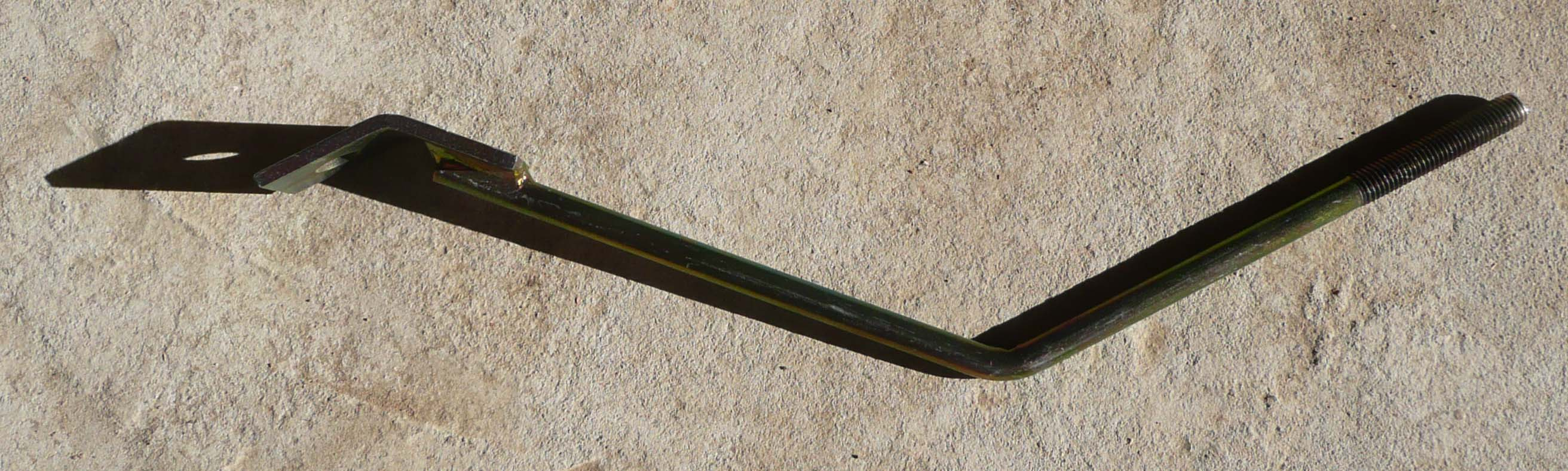
Welded eye deep cranked eye bolt in profile
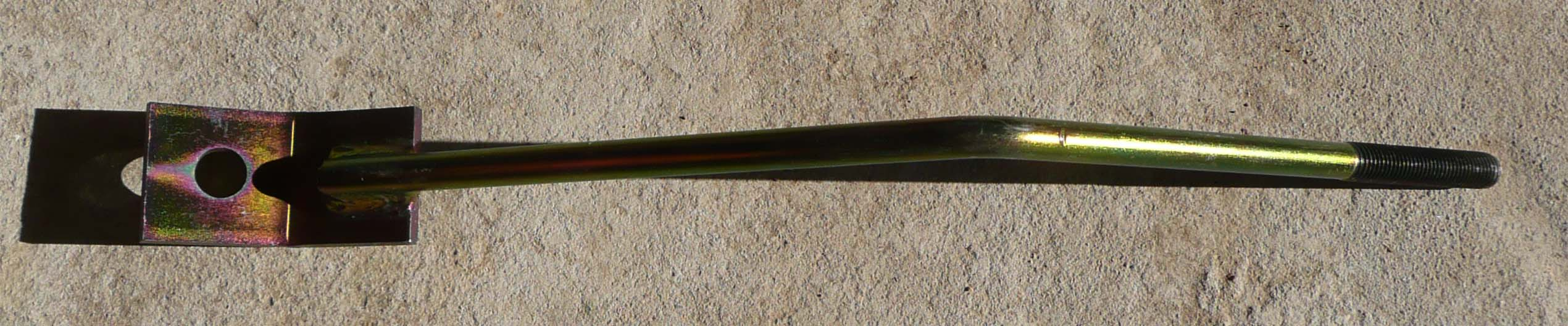
Welded eye deep cranked eye bolt in portrait

== See also ==
- Eye bolt
- Tie down
