= Sue Maberry =

American artist, administrator, librarian

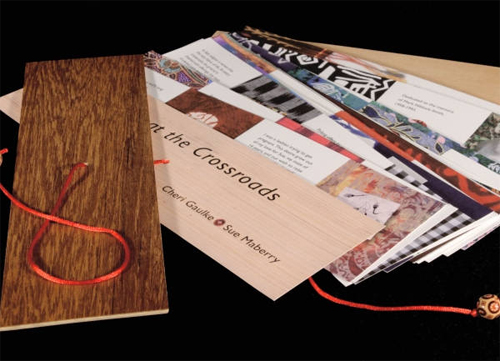
Offerings at the Crossroads is an artist's book by Cheri Gaulke and Sue Maberry

Sue Maberry is an American artist, administrator, graphic artist and librarian. She is known for her participation in the Women's Graphic Center the print workshop located in the Woman's Building in Los Angeles, California. She is also known as a librarian at the Otis College of Art and Design.

According to the Otis College Archive, Maberry attended Pitzer College for her undergraduate degree and California State University, San Jose for her master's degree.

After receiving her undergraduate degree Maberry became involved in the Feminist Studio Workshop at the Woman's Building. She eventually became the business manager for the printing arm of the organization, called the Women's Graphic Center. For a time that project was profitable for the Woman's Building.

Maberry was part of the anti-nuclear performance group Sisters of Survival (S.O.S) along with fellow artists Jerri Allyn, Nancy Angelo, Anne Gauldin, and Cheri Gaulke.

In 2012 Maberry co-curated the 2011 exhibition Doin' it in public: feminism and art at the Woman's Building. She also served as an editor on the catalog, as well as working on a series of 45 video archives.

Maberry married Cheri Gaulke and the couple created the artist's book Marriage matters : in the 26th year of our relationship, we wrote the story of our love and life together.
