= Elana Mann =

American artist (born 1982)

- Born: November 26, 1982 (age 43); Newton, Massachusetts, U.S.
- Education: Washington University in St. Louis; California Institute of the Arts
- Known for: Performance art Sculpture; Video

Elana Mann (born November 26, 1982) is a contemporary artist living and working in Los Angeles, California. Her artwork is a commentary on social issues and politics related to gender, power and nationality.

== Early life ==
Mann is Jewish, and her family was part of the Reconstructionist Judaism movement.

== Work ==
In 2013 the artist created 3 large sculptures for an exhibition at Side Street Projects in Pasadena. Mann was inspired by listening technology used between World War I and World War II.

=== Exchange Rate 2008 ===
Exchange rate: 2008, was organized by Elana Mann in response to the 2008 U.S. presidential election. Thirty-eight artists living in sixteen countries participated in the project. With the aid of the website exchangerate2008.com, participating artists produced, exchanged, and interpreted performance directions related to the election campaign. A book was published that documented the project.

=== ARLA ===
ARLA was formed by Mann, vocal artist Juliana Snapper, filmmaker Vera Brunner-Sung, and choreographer Kristen Smiarowski. ARLA is a flexible acronym for Audile Receptives Los Angeles or A Ripe Little Archive. The group came together to study scores and techniques of listening developed by composer Pauline Oliveros. ARLA led workshops, listening sessions, discussion groups and did several performances most notably at Occupy LA and the Getty Museum. ARLA also published the People's Microphony Song Book, a book of performance scores that utilize the Peoples Microphone. When asked about how she felt about her scores being re-performed Pauline Oliveros said "I am happy that Elana Mann chose to use my Sonic Meditations for the People’s Microphony project. These pieces are meant for anyone that wants to perform them regardless of musical training.”

=== Chann & Mann ===
Since 2005, Elana Mann and Audrey Chann, have collaborated under the moniker Chann & Mann. The duo formed during their studies at the California Institute of the Arts. They had their first retrospective "Chann & Mhann: A Historical Retrospective" at Elephant Art Space. Chan & Mann reperformed Leslie Labowitz-Starus Myths of Rape at the 2012 LA Art Show. Chan & Mann organized Shares & Stakeholders: The Feminist Art Project Day of Panels at the 2012 College Art Association Conference at the Museum of Contemporary Art. In 2013 Chan and Mann had a solo exhibition at the Ben Maltz Gallery at the Otis College of Art and Design called The glass ceiling is a glass hyman pierced by a glass dildo inside a larger glass vagina.

=== Chats About Change ===
"Chats About Change: Critical Conversations on Art and Politics in Los Angeles” was a two-day event organized by artists Elana Mann and Robby Herbst. The program was hosted by Los Angeles Contemporary Exhibitions and the student union at Cal State L.A. A series of discussions amongst artist and activists, it included panels such as "navigating L.A.’s landscapes in ecologically conscious ways", “How Can I Participate?” and “Creative Dissonance,”.

=== Years of Wonder ===
"Years of Wonder" is a solo exhibit by Elana Mann through 2020–2021. Years of Wonder is a book created by Geraldine Brooks that inspired Mann to create a visual and sonic scenery of the global pandemic. Mann wanted to describe the civil and social unrest and the complete division from the presidential election. Years of Wonder exhibit took place in Santa Monica, CA and San Antonio, TX.
