= Women's Graphic Center =

Art workshop in Los Angeles, California, US

The Women's Graphic Center (WGC) was a print workshop located in the Woman's Building in Los Angeles, California. It was founded in 1973 by Sheila Levrant de Bretteville. Susan E. King was the artistic director and Sue Maberry was the business manager. The workshop provided the tools for typesetting, printing, and bookbinding. The center had equipment for offset lithography, letterpress printing and silkscreen printing. The WGC had exhibition space, as well as offering classes and renting studio time. The WGC evolved into the Women's Graphic Center Typesetting and Design, a business providing design and printing service. It closed in 1991 along with The Woman's Building.

The archives of the workshop are in the Archives of American Art at the Smithsonian Institution. and the Los Angeles Public Library.
