= Sheila Levrant de Bretteville =

American graphic designer, artist and educator (born 1940)

- Born: Sheila Levrant; 1940 (age 85–86); Brooklyn, New York, U.S.
- Education: Barnard College; Yale University
- Occupations: Graphic designer; public artist; educator
- Awards: 2004 Gold Medal from the American Institute of Graphic Arts

Sheila Levrant de Bretteville (born 1940) is an American graphic designer, artist and educator whose work reflects her belief in the importance of feminist principles and user participation in graphic design. In 1990, she became the director of the Yale University Graduate Program in Graphic Design and the first woman to receive tenure at the Yale University School of Art. In 2010, she was named the Caroline M. Street Professor of Graphic Design.

== Early life and education ==
Sheila Levrant was born in 1940 in Brooklyn, New York. Her parents were Polish immigrants who fled anti-semitism in the 1920s and worked in the textile and millinery industries. Her mother brought her to painting lessons at the Brooklyn Museum as a child. She graduated from Abraham Lincoln High School in 1959. At Lincoln, she studied under Leon Friend who first exposed her to modern graphic design and the social responsibility of designers and encouraged her to participate in design and painting competitions.

Levrant received her BA in art history from Barnard College in 1962 and an MFA in graphic design from Yale University in 1964 and has been awarded Honorary Doctorates from the California Institute of the Arts (CalArts), the Moore College of Art and California College of the Arts. She married in 1965, adopting the married name Sheila Levrant de Bretteville.

== Career ==
De Bretteville moved to Los Angeles around 1969, working as an in-house graphic designer at the California Institute of the Arts before becoming the first woman faculty member in the design department in 1970. In 1971, she founded the first design program for women at CalArts, and two years later co-founded the Woman's Building, a public center in Los Angeles dedicated to women's education and culture. In 1973, de Bretteville founded the Women's Graphic Center and co-founded the Feminist Studio Workshop (along with Judy Chicago and Arlene Raven), both based at the Woman's Building.

She designed a necklace of an eye bolt on a chain, meant to represent "strength without a fist" as well as the biological symbol of women; she gave the first of these to Arlene Raven and Judy Chicago when they started the Feminist Studio Workshop in 1972. Since then, she has given them to other women with whom she shares a vision of the creation of women's culture. Members of the Feminist Studio Workshop of 1978–79 also made 500 of these necklaces to celebrate the fifth anniversary of the Woman's Building in Los Angeles. The feminist art group Sisters of Jam (Mikaela & Moa Krestesen) turned the necklace into a mobile monument; they see the eye bolt "as a symbol for the work already done but also as an encouragement for the work that is not yet completed." Sisters of Jam also did the installation "Hello Sheila", which features an eye bolt on a chain, at the Survival Kit Festival in Umeå in 2014.

In 1980, de Bretteville initiated the communication design program at the Otis College of Art and Design, a division of the New School.

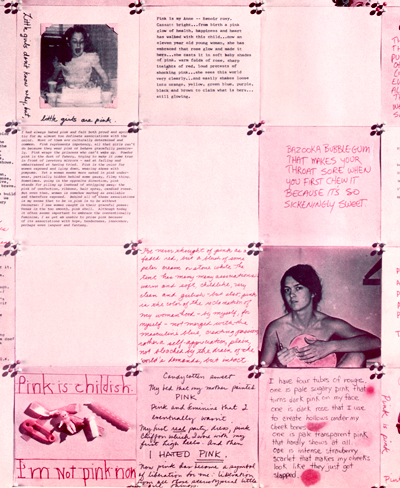
Poster created by Sheila de Bretteville in 1973

De Bretteville has had a lifelong interest in communal forms of art, which she believed were an essential component of the Feminist art movement in the United States. In 1973, she created Pink, a broadside meant to explore the notions of gender as associated with the color pink, for an American Institute of Graphic Arts exhibition about color. This was the only entry about the color pink. Various women including many in the Feminist Studio Workshop submitted entries exploring their association with the color. De Bretteville arranged the squares of paper to form a "quilt" from which posters were printed and disseminated throughout Los Angeles. She was referred to by the nickname "Pinky" as a result.

De Bretteville has worked extensively in the field of public art creating works embedded within city neighborhoods. One of her best-known pieces is "Biddy Mason's Place: A Passage of Time,” an 82-foot concrete wall with embedded objects in downtown Los Angeles that tells the story of Biddy Mason, a former slave who became a midwife in Los Angeles and lived near the site. She collaborated with Betye Saar to create the piece. In "Path of Stars", completed in 1994 in a New Haven neighborhood, de Bretteville documented the lives of local citizens—past and present—with 21 granite stars set in the sidewalk. The 1996 project "Remembering Little Tokyo" is also located in Los Angeles; de Bretteville collaborated with artist Sonya Ishii to interview residents and create brass tiled etched with symbols representing local history and Japanese American identities. She also created the mural "At the Start... At Long Last" for the Inwood-207th Street station in New York City, which was influenced by the song "Take the A Train" by jazz musician Billy Strayhorn.

De Bretteville's work as a feminist, activist, educator, public artist, and graphic designer was the subject of the 2024 exhibition "Sheila Levrant de Bretteville: Community, Activism, and Design" co-curated by independent curator Brooke Hodge and YUAG curator of American decorative arts John Stuart Gordon for Yale University Art Gallery. This was the first comprehensive exhibition devoted to the important work of de Bretteville and included many original materials from the artist's own collection.

De Bretteville was interviewed for the film !Women Art Revolution.

She is a member of the Connecticut Academy of Arts and Sciences.

== Awards ==
She has been honored with many awards, such as a 2009 “Grandmaster” award from the New York Art Directors Club and several awards from the American Institute of Graphic Arts, including a "Design Legend Gold Medal" for 2004, "Best Public Artwork" recognition for 2005 from Americans for the Arts, and several honorary doctorates. In 2016, de Bretteville received a Lifetime Achievement Award from the Women's Caucus for Art.

== See also ==
- First Things First 2000 manifesto, signed by de Bretteville (among others)

== Bibliography ==
- De Bretteville, Sheila Levrant. "More of the Young Men Are Feminists: An Interview with Shiela Levrant de Bretteville" In Women in Graphic Design 1890–2012, edited by Gerda Breuer and Julia Meer, p. 236-241. Berlin: Jovis, 2012.
- Hale, Sondra, and Terry Wolverton (eds). From Site To Vision: The Woman's Building in Contemporary Culture. Los Angeles, CA: Ben Maltz Gallery, Otis College of Art and Design, 2011.
- Redniss, L. "First Person: Three Styles". Print v. 58 no. 2 (March/April 2004) pp. 56–61
- Close, J. A. "Reconcilable Differences". ID (v. 48 no. 1 (January/February 2001) pp. 58
- Pou, A. "Exploding the Model: On Youth and Art". Public Art Review v. 9 no. 2 (Spring/Summer 1998), pp. 4–11
- Betsky, A., et al., "The I.D. Forty: An Insider's Guide to America's Leading Design Innovators". ID (New York, N.Y.) v. 40 (January/February 1993), pp. 45–67
- Brown, B. A. "Hope for the 90's" (What Feminist Art Movement Leaders Feel Today". Artweek v. 21 (February 8, 1990), pp. 22–3
- Brumfield, J. "Sheila Levrant de Bretteville (interview with Yale's new director of the graduate program on graphic design)". Graphis v. 47 (March/April 1991), pp. 30–35
- De Bretteville, Sheila Levrant. "Some aspects of design from the perspective of a woman designer". In Looking Closer 3: Classic Writings on Graphic Design, edited by Michael Bierut, et al., pp. 238–245. New York: Allworth Press, 1999. Originally published in Icographic 6 (1973).
- De Bretteville, Sheila Levrant, and John Brumfield. "Sheila Levrant de Bretteville". Graphis 47, no. 272 (March–April 1991): 30–35.
- De Bretteville, Sheila Levrant, and Ellen Lupton. "Sheila Levrant de Bretteville". Eye 2, no. 8 (1993): 10–16.
- De Forest, A. "Sheila Levrant de Bretteville (the Biddy Mason Wall, Los Angeles". ID (New York, N.Y.) v. 37 (May/June 1990), p. 24.
- Deneve, R. "A Feminist Option". Print 30, no. 3 (May–June 1976): 54–9, 88–90.
- Wallis, B. "Public Art Marks Historic L.A. Site". Art in America v. 78 (June 1990), p. 207
