= Center for the Study of Political Graphics =

Non-profit archive

The Center for the Study of Political Graphics (CSPG) is a United States non-profit, educational and research archive that collects, preserves, documents, and circulates domestic and international political posters relating to historical and contemporary movements for social change. From its base in Los Angeles, California, CSPG organizes travelling exhibitions, lectures, and workshops, and publishes educational material. Their website also hosts virtual exhibitions.

== Carol A. Wells, Founder ==
CSPG was founded in 1989 by Carol Wells. Wells has been involved in social justice since high school when she discovered the power of political graphics "when a UCLA professor hired her to travel to Nicaragua in 1981 to collect posters for him after the Sandinistas had come to power. She has said, "I literally had that dismissive attitude toward a poster that, once I realized how important posters are, I resented in other people." She holds a B.A. in History and M.A. in Art History from UCLA. She taught history of art and architecture for thirteen years at California State University, Fullerton. She has also served as a mentor for the Creative Action program at Otis College of Art and Design teaching students about the power of art to make change. Since 1981, Wells has been collecting posters internationally that advocate for civil rights. She is an expert on political graphics and has published scores of articles and essays about political poster art. She has also organized over 100 poster exhibitions.

== About the archive ==
The CSPG archive currently contains more than 85,000 posters and has the largest collection of post-World War II social justice posters in the United States and the second largest in the world. Media and techniques represented include offset, lithography, linocut, woodblock, silkscreen, stencil, and photocopy. All prints are catalogued to aid researchers. CSPG also loans out prints to other institutions for exhibit. Portions of the collection are available through the Online Archives of California, an initiative of the California Digital Library.

A major article in the LA Weekly in 2015 said: "Protest posters of every kind are preserved in the center's archives, along with thousands of bumper stickers and political buttons. Online, at politicalgraphics.org, the center features a poster of the week, such as one recognizing the 50th anniversary of the assassination of Malcolm X." CSPG founder Carol Wells was also interviewed on NPR's Morning Edition on Mar 13, 1996 about the "Decade of Protest" exhibition exhibit at Los Angeles Contemporary Exhibitions.

CSPG depends upon the donation of posters to make this resource as representative as possible of the many historical and ongoing struggles. CSPG has also received grants from the Getty Trust, Los Angeles County Arts Commission, Department of Cultural Affairs (City of Los Angeles, David Geffen Foundation, The James Irvine Foundation, among many others.

A fundraiser is held annually called "Celebrating the Art of Resistance." Three honors are awarded each year—Aris & Carolyn Anagnos Culture of Liberation Award, The Art as a Hammer Award, and The Historian of the Lions.

== Exhibitions ==
In the wake of the 2006 Great American Boycott, CSPG organized a labor-themed exhibition. In the last seventeen years, CSPG exhibitions has created toured exhibitions to more than 280 venues worldwide. They are mounted at various galleries institutions, and are accompanied by translations. Exhibition Guides are usually published and contain excellent scholarly writing on the subjects. CSPG's traveling exhibitions (available for rental) are presented from a multi-issue and multicultural perspective, and tend to focus on current issues. For example, upon the death of Ronald Reagan, CSPG mounted an exhibition of anti-Reagan posters.

"Art Against Empire: Graphic Responses to U.S. Interventions Since World War II" was exhibited at Los Angeles Contemporary Exhibitions in 2010.

In 1994, "All Power to the People," showcased protest posters and graphics produced during the height of the Black Panther Party the Southern California Library for Social Studies and Research.

Other examples include "Too Hot To Handle Graphics on Global Warming, Pollution & Climate Justice. It was funded in part by the City of Los Angeles Cultural Affairs Department and the California Arts Council.; "Reclaiming the F-Word: Posters on International Feminism(s)"; and "Globalize THIS! International Graphics of Resistance!" Exhibition Guides are published and contain excellent scholarly writing on the subjects.

== See also ==
- Graphics
- Editorial cartoon
