= Eye bolt =

Type of bolt

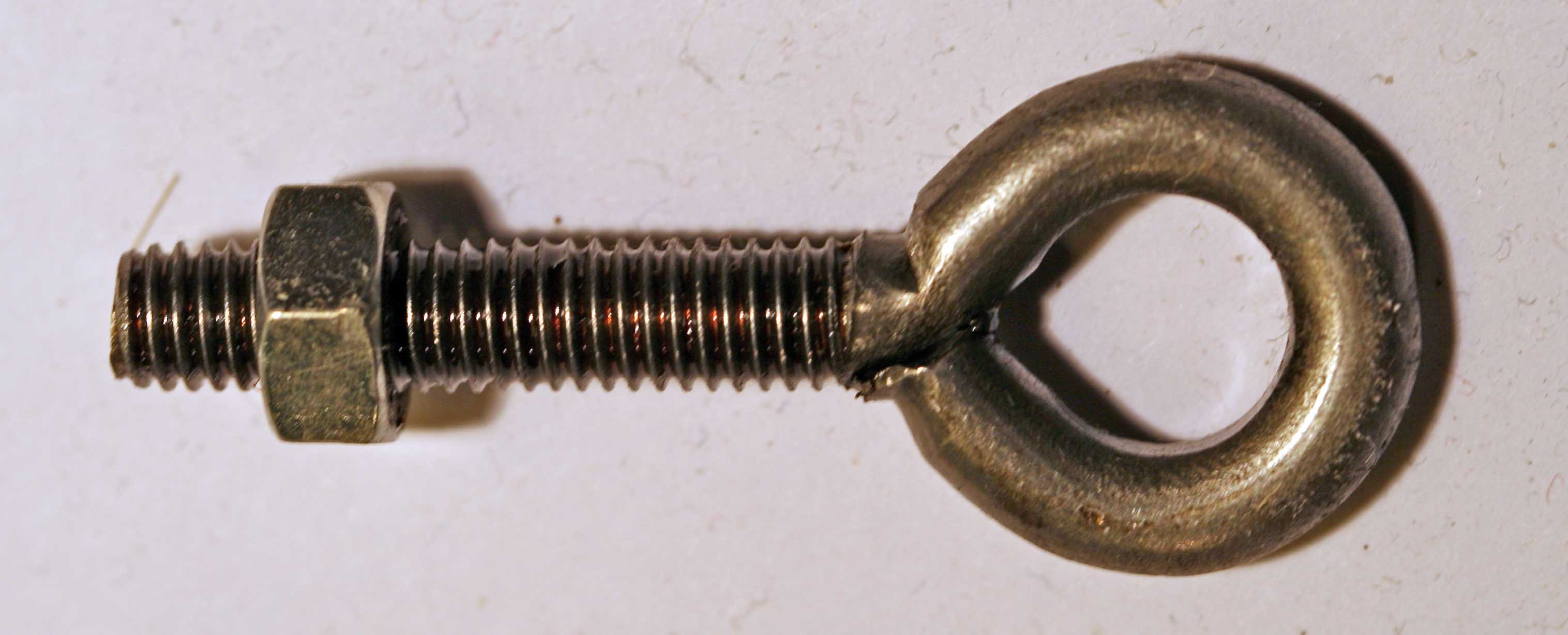
Eye bolt, with nut

An eye bolt is a bolt with a loop at one end. They are used to firmly attach a securing eye to a structure, so that ropes or cables may then be tied to it.

== Eye bolts ==
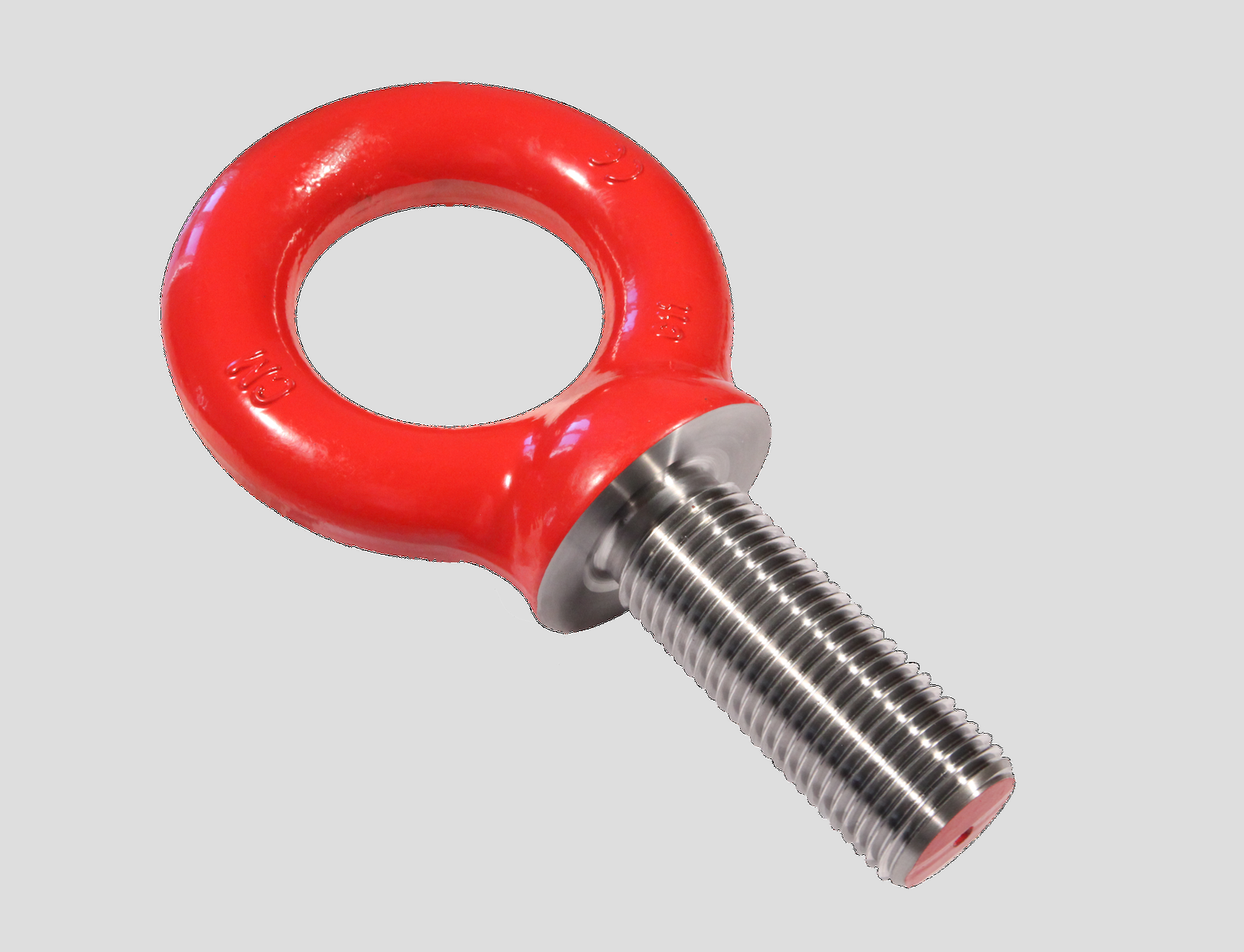
Heavy forged eye bolt, with shoulder

Machinery eye bolts are fully threaded and may have a collar, making them suitable for use with angular loads up to 45°. Eye bolts without a shoulder should not be used for angular loads.

Heavy forged eye bolts with a continuous eye may be forged with an integral shoulder, allowing their use for heavy off-axis loads.

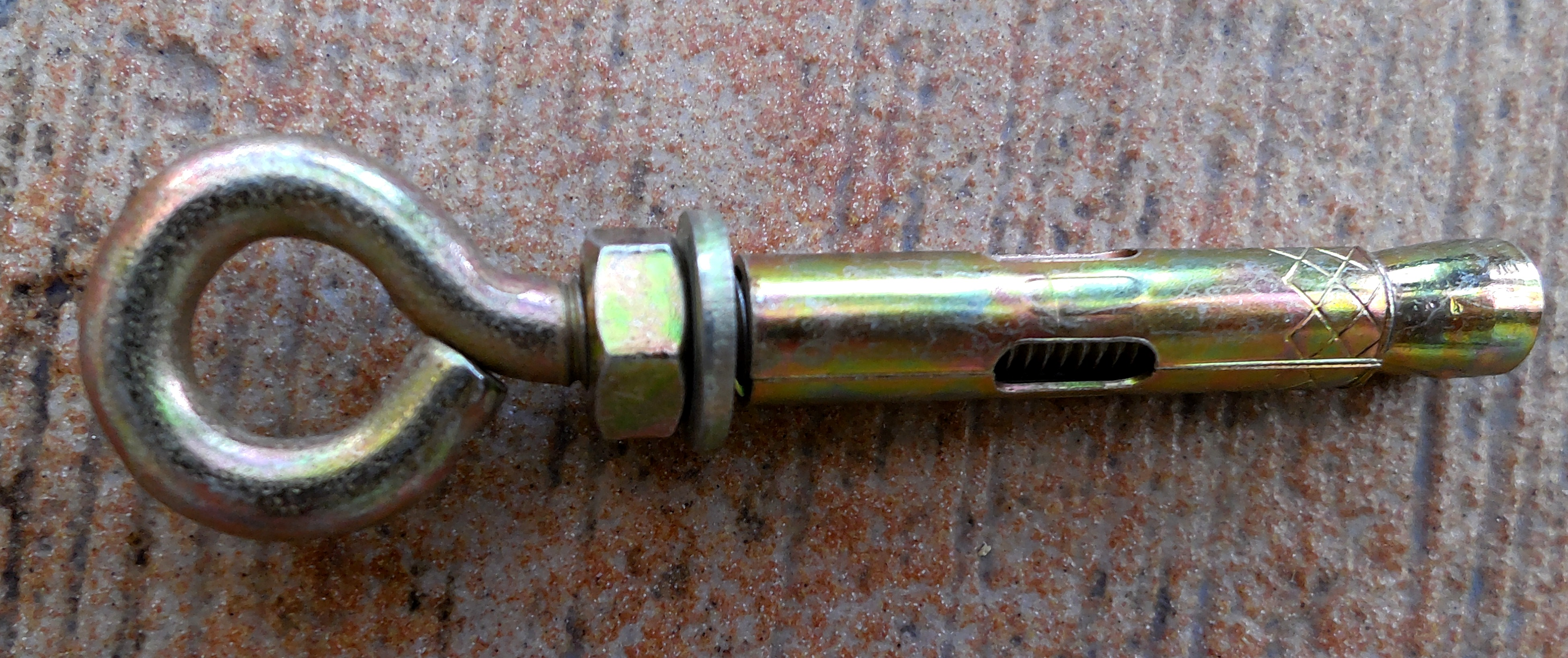
Eye bolt with expansion anchor

Eye bolts are often installed into masonry and so versions that form their own anchor bolt are commonly available. Most of these screw into some form of shield anchor. Some lightweight forms are not screwed, but rely on just the pull on the ring itself to expand the anchor.

=== Ring bolts ===
A ring bolt is an eye bolt with a captive ring passing through it. The loose ring is articulated, such that it can rotate in at least one axis, and can thus reduce bending forces on the bolt when loaded and will present the minimum obstruction when "flat".

== Screw eyes ==
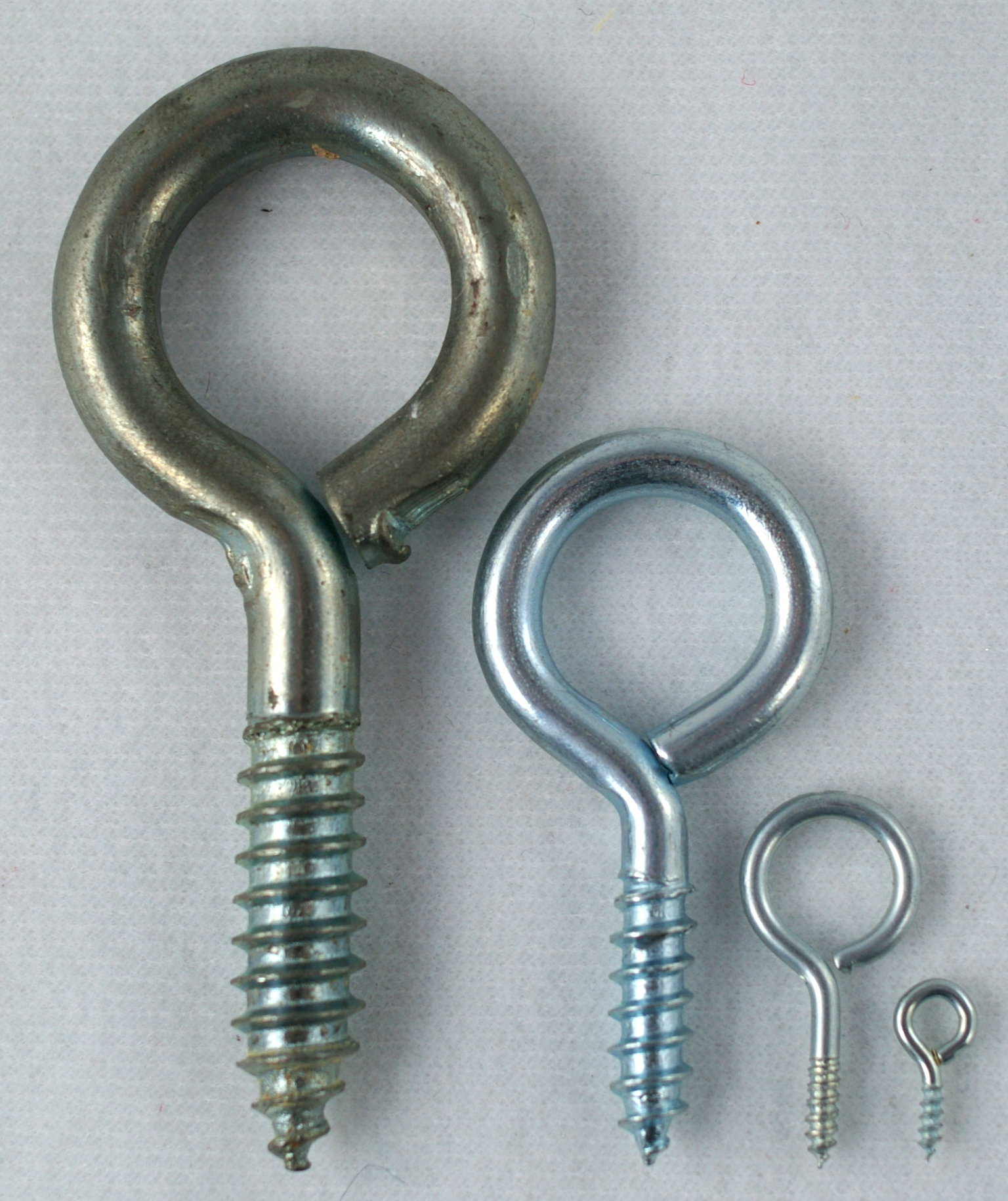
Screw eyes

Screw eyes are a screw with a loop on one end and threads on the other end. Screw eyes are commonly used to attach cables to objects, for instance attaching a string to the back of a painting to allow the painting to hang from a nail on a wall. Long-shanked screw eyes are termed 'vine eyes' and are used to attach support wires to wooden fence posts when growing soft fruit or grape vines, the plants then being tied to the wires.

Lag screws

Wire eye lags (also called screw thread eye bolts, eye screws, or turned/bent eye lags) have a wood screw thread for use in wood or lag anchors. Like wire eye bolts, wire eye lags are intended for light duty applications and should not be used for angular loads.

== Forged vs. bent eye construction ==
Eye bolts made by bending a rod or wire into a loop are only suitable for light duty applications, as heavy loads can cause the eye to open. For high loads, eye bolts with forged or welded loops should be chosen, as they can withstand loads up to the tensile strength of the material of which they are made.

=== Pigtail eye bolts ===
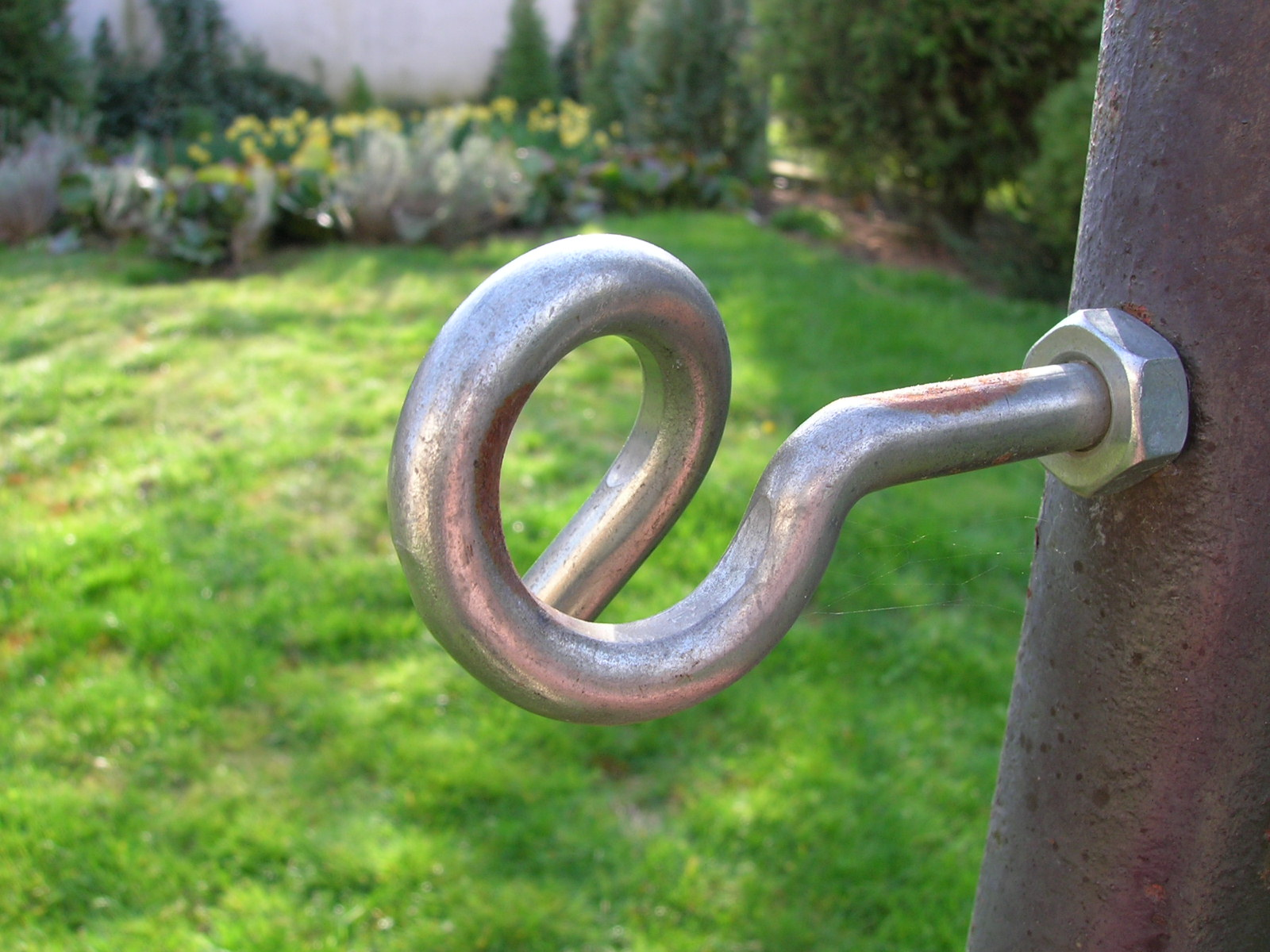
Pigtail eye bolt

'Pigtail' eye bolts are a form of bent loop where the ends are not closed, but multiple turns are used to prevent a rope slipping out. They allow a rope to be threaded into the loop, even if its ends are already attached elsewhere.

== Feminist symbolism ==
Feminist artist Sheila Levrant de Bretteville designed a necklace of an eye bolt on a chain, meant to represent "strength without a fist"; she gave the first of these to Arlene Raven and Judy Chicago when they started the Feminist Studio Workshop in 1972. Since then she has given them to other women with whom she shares a vision of the creation of women's culture. Members of the Feminist Studio Workshop of 1978-79 also made 500 of these necklaces to celebrate the 5th anniversary of the Woman's Building in Los Angeles. (Note: See the Women in Design poster image) The feminist art group Sisters of Jam (Mikaela & Moa Krestesen) turned the necklace into a mobile monument; they see the eye bolt "as a symbol for the work already done but also as an encouragement for the work that is not yet completed." Sisters of Jam also did the installation "Hello Sheila", which features an eyebolt on a chain, at the Survival Kit Festival in Umeå in 2014.

== See also ==
- Cranked eye bolt
- U-bolt
