= Suzanne Lacy =

American artist (born 1945)

- Born: 1945 (age 80–81); Wasco, California, United States
- Known for: Performance art; installation; video; public art; artist books
- Notable work: Prostitution Notes (1974); Inevitable Associations (1976); Three Weeks in May (1977); In Mourning and Rage (1977); Whisper, the Waves, the Wind (1984); The Crystal Quilt (1987); The Oakland Projects (1991–2001); Full Circle (1993); Auto: On the Edge of Time (1994); Storying Rape (2012); Between the Door and Street (2013)
- Awards: Guggenheim Fellow (1993); Public Art Dialogue Annual Award (2009); College Art Association Distinguished Artist Award for Lifetime Achievement (2010); Women's Caucus for Art Lifetime Achievement Award (2012)
- Website: www.suzannelacy.com

Suzanne Lacy (born 1945) is an American artist, educator, writer, and professor at the USC Roski School of Art and Design. She has worked in a variety of media, including installation, video, performance, public art, photography, and art books, in which she focuses on "social themes and urban issues". She served in the education cabinet of Jerry Brown, then mayor of Oakland, California, and as arts commissioner for the city. She designed multiple educational programs beginning with her role as performance faculty at the Feminist Studio Workshop at the Woman's Building in Los Angeles.

== Early life and education ==
Having been involved with feminism since the late 1960s, Lacy attended California State University, Fresno in 1969, taking up graduate studies in psychology. There, Lacy and fellow graduate student Faith Wilding established the first feminist consciousness-raising group on campus. This led to her attendance in Judy Chicago's Feminist Art Program during the fall of 1970. The 1970s became a period where Lacy continued to explore identities, women's bodies, and social conditions.

== Performance art ==
=== Ablutions ===
In 1972 Lacy collaborated with three women; Judy Chicago, Sandra Orgel and Aviva Rahmani creating a piece of performance art called Ablutions. This performance was inspired by the women's earlier exploration of rape within their different practices. The performance itself included explicit audio recorded experiences of female rape victims, which continuously played on a loop. As well as this there was also the visual aspects of the performance, which included women bathing in body-sized metal tubs of eggs, blood and clay. Additionally eggshells, ropes, chains and animal kidneys were scattered across the floor. This performance was self produced in a studio in California and has been categorised as a revolutionary art performance in regards to feminism.

=== Maps ===
In 1973, Lacy produced Maps for a class taught by Allan Kaprow at CalArts. It involved an extended scavenger hunt for its participants, in which they followed Lacy's maps to different destinations around Los Angeles, such as a hospital for the developmentally challenged and an abandoned slaughterhouse. In the final segment of the piece, participants were given a meatpackers gown to wear as they attempted to put lamb organs into a shape resembling a live animal. The performance has been remarked upon for using the body of the viewer instead of the body of the artist.

=== Inevitable Associations ===
The 1976 renovation of the Biltmore Hotel in Los Angeles sparked Lacy's performance art piece, Inevitable Associations. The marketing surrounding the old hotel's renovations compared the hotel to an old woman. Photographs showing the hotels' original structure stating "There May Be Life in the Old Girl Yet" forced the artist to question the ways in which our society views older women. Throughout her career one can see Lacy's awareness and desire to rebuttal the invisibility of aging women in performances such as Whisper, the Waves, the Wind (1984) and Crystal Quilt (1987).

The performance of Inevitable Associations took place over a span of two days in the lobby of the Biltmore Hotel. The first day of the performance featured a public makeover of Lacy. It took nearly three hours for a makeup artist to publicly turn Lacy into an old woman. As the makeover was occurring, collaborators passed out flyers and literature on the hotel renovation as well as information about cosmetic surgery. Throughout the performance old women dressed in all black began to slowly enter the lobby and take seats on the opposite side of Lacy. This went nearly unnoticed until the number of elderly women had grown so large that their presence became undeniable to all of those in the lobby. Once Lacy's makeover was complete the mass of older women silently dressed Lacy in black clothes. The second day of the performance featured three elderly women participants who sat in red chairs in the lobby and told stories about their lives after the age of 60 and the effects of aging to passerby's and any audience that formed. Lacy's goal throughout the performance was to bring awareness to the invisibility women must struggle with as they age and no longer fit into society's standards of beauty. Inevitable Associations was a crucial point in Lacy's career as it was the first time in which Lacy took her performance to the public streets.

=== Three Weeks in May ===
In 1977, Lacy and collaborator Leslie Labowitz combined performance art with activism in Three Weeks in May. The event included a performance piece on the steps of Los Angeles City Hall and self-defense classes for women in an attempt to highlight and curb sexual violence against women. The artists updated a map with reports from the Los Angeles Police Department, printing the word "rape" on spots on a map of the greater Los Angeles Area. The goal, Lacy explained, "was not only to raise public awareness, but to empower women to fight back and to transcend the sense of secrecy and shame associated with rape".

=== In Mourning and In Rage ===
Lacy and Labowitz teamed up with Bia Lowe, and other artists, in 1977 to create, In Mourning and In Rage, a large-scale public protest performance. It had been designed to challenge media coverage that sensationalized a rash of murders of women by the so-called Hillside Strangler; the tone of the press coverage seemed geared to heighten the climate of fear which reinforced the image of women as victims. The performance began when a group of exceptionally tall women, made taller by towering black headpieces, arrived at City Hall in a hearse, followed by a caravan of cars filled with women in black. The Performers debarked and formed a circle in front of the steps of City Hall, beneath a banner that read, "In memory of our sisters, women fight back." The artist's designed the performance, action and imagery, specifically to captivate the interest of television news; and, in successfully achieving this network coverage, used the media to critique itself—which extended the impact of the art performance far beyond the usual feminist and/or art audience.

Participants from the Woman's Building, the Rape Hotline Alliance, and City Council joined with the feminist community and families of the victims in creating a public ritual of rage as well as grief. Lacy and Labowitz founded ARIADNE: A Social Art Network, a collaborative group to create community-based artwork and educational opportunities. In the mid-seventies, Lacy curated the first exhibition of women's performance art at Womanspace Gallery at The Woman's Building. In 1981, she collaborated with Susan Hiller to curate the exhibition We'll Think of a Title When We Meet: Women Performance Artists from London and Los Angeles at Franklin Furnace, a well-known alternative arts venue founded in 1976 by Martha Wilson.

=== Reworked performances ===
Lacy produced many performances in various sites around the world, mostly focusing on race, class and gender equity. During the first two decades of the 2000s, she reworked earlier performances, including WACK! Art and the Feminist Revolution, based upon the venues and objectives. In 2012, she re-created the 1977 performance for the Getty Pacific Standard Time Performance Festival. Three Weeks in January, was an anti-rape performance based on her landmark 1977 project; this time the map was installed prominently on the Los Angeles Police Department's main campus.

=== Whisper, the Waves, the Wind ===
Whisper, the Waves, the Wind, created with Sharon Allen in 1984, was the culmination of the Whisper Project, a yearlong series of events that highlighted the special needs of older women. "I'm interested in the mythology surrounding older women," Lacy responded when being interviewed about her work, "in how they are denuded of their power in our culture. I want to help them overcome the barriers set up by prejudice, by the accumulation of wealth and power. I want to reinfuse them with their power and realized how right and evocative the sea was as a setting. With all its cycles, I think people will get the feeling whether they understand it or not, that sense of continuity in matriarchal consciousness." On the morning of the performance a procession of 154 ethnically diverse older women (between the ages of 65 and 99) all dressed in white, moving slowly down a staircase to the vast beach below. They sat in groups of four, at white cloth-covered tables on two adjacent beaches at Children's Pool in La Jolla. Their animated conversations focused on pre-selected topics—their thoughts about the physical process of aging; preparing for death; loss; the women's movement; what advice they would give to younger women." The audience watched and listened from the cliffs high above the beach where they could hear a collage of the women's voices piped through speakers, managed by sound composer Susan Stone. "From the whisper of women's voices on a beach to a shout of rage on the steps of City Hall, Suzanne Lacy's art is one of alchemy and exorcism, celebration and condemnation", wrote Margot Mifflin in her interview with Lacy about the performance.

=== Crystal Quilt ===
On Mother's Day, May 10, 1987, Lacy directed the hour-long Crystal Quilt, a sequel to Whisper, the Waves, the Wind. This time, however, the performance was staged indoors, in what is known as the "Crystal Court" (a space normally occupied by kiosks and a café) in the IDS Center, a downtown Minneapolis skyscraper designed by Philip Johnson and John Burgee. The Crystal Quilt was the most ambitions and most complex of all of Lacy's 1980's vivant, as she often describes these grand, large-scale productions. The Crystal Quilt, which featured 430 older women. Filmed and broadcast live on PBS, the performance involved "women talking about their lives as their gathering created an eighty-two foot square tableau in the shape of a quilt". The performance was attended by over 3,000 people.

Lacy believes that her work cannot be re-enacted literally based on its immediate response to specific times and places. However, as many issues remain current it is possible to "re-think" works in new contexts. In an interview for SFMOMA, for instance, Lacy noted, "When considering re-performing a work, I think about whether the issue still has meaning, and the new insights that inform this place and time. Is it worth making this work again and how would I change it?"

=== Silver Action ===
Like Crystal Quilt, Silver Action concerns older women, a re-creation produced for the opening of The Tanks performance space at Tate Modern. Silver Action took place in February 2013 at the Tate Modern Gallery in London and featured 400 women over the age of 60 discussing activism regarding women's rights: their past participation, the future, and how their views have changed as they matured.

=== The Oakland Projects ===
Between 1991 and 2001, Lacy staged The Oakland Projects, a community performance art project, with TEAM (Teens, Educators, Artists, Media Makers) members. The Oakland Projects aimed to engage local California youth in consciousness-raising discussions about police brutality, social injustice, education, and other social issues. Participants did not 'perform' in the traditional sense, but instead mirrored the social stereotypes that they see in their community. The Roof is On Fire (1993–1994) was a two-year project in which Lacy and collaborators developed media literacy classes for Oakland youth, and conducted a one-night performance piece. More than 200 young people had conversations in cars about race, class, gender, inequality, and other issues. Observers were asked to listen in on the conversations. The students trained in independent media created a documentary of the performance, which was covered on mainstream news stations.

=== Three Weeks in January ===
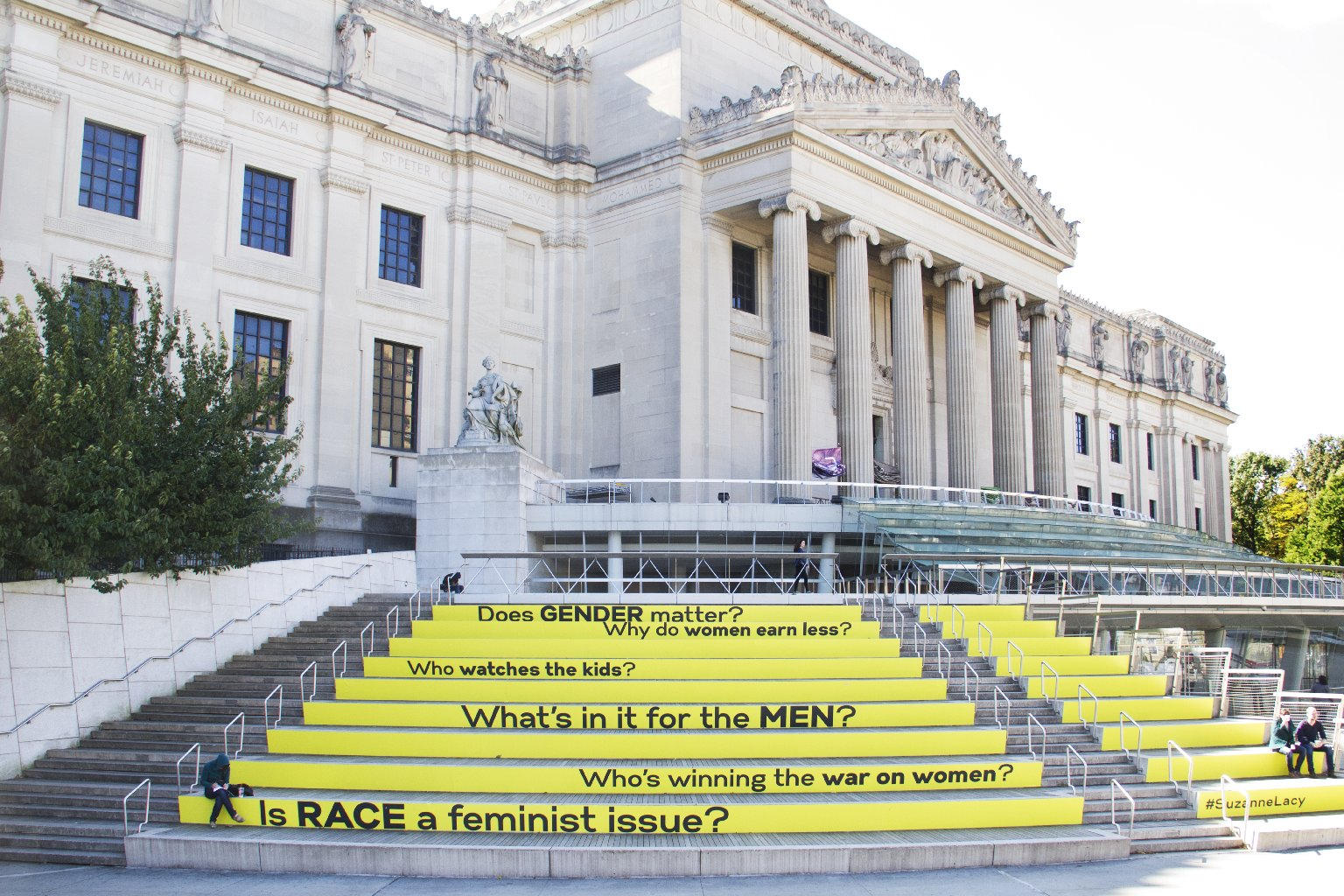
Between the Door and the Street, Suzanne Lacy, Installation at the Brooklyn Museum, 2013

In 2012, Lacy modified her earlier work Three Weeks in May (1977) for a new project called Three Weeks in January, which continued the dialogue about rape in Los Angeles. It included presentations, conversations, and a performance called Storying Rape. Storying Rape: Shame Ends Here grew into another art project produced for the Liverpool Biennial in 2012, which promoted a public conversation in the English city about rape violence, education, and prevention.

Like Three Weeks In May, Three Weeks In January also addresses rape focuses on Los Angeles. The project was a platform for over 40 events gathering all types of people from different fields such as politicians, artists and educators to address rape cases happening anywhere in Los Angeles. Over a few decades of anti-rape movements, organizing strategies are better developed now through outreach such as social media. A huge map of Los Angeles was placed at the entrance of a police department for daily marking of rape reports. Bruno Louchouarn created a bench nearby was the source of a soundtrack of survivors. I Know Someone, Do You was the topic of the campaign on social media.

=== Between the Door and the Street ===
In October 2013, Lacy organized conversations among women on the stoops of Park Place houses in Brooklyn, New York, for her Between the Door and the Street Project. Sponsored by the Brooklyn Museum's Elizabeth A. Sackler Center for Feminist Art, 360 participants discussed gender issues while passersby listened in.

=== Prostitution Notes ===
Prostitution Notes was a research-based piece created by Suzanne Lacy in 1974 that was made to explore the lives of sex workers and to relate those experiences to her own life, "looking for echoes of their lives in mine". Lacy spent four months in Los Angeles interviewing and speaking with a wide variety of people ranging from both male and female sex workers (one even including a sociology grad student), pimps, and sex worker advocates. During Lacy's interviews she would record every single aspect of the encounter. This included what she ate, what her subjects ate, what she was told, the emotions she felt, and how she connected her life to theirs. By the end of her research Lacy was left with ten large diagrams, which showed Lacy's experience and thought process throughout her four months.

When asked about her work, Lacy stated that "Most of what we knew at that time came from literature and films that greatly glamorized the life. I didn't want to flirt with their reality as a performance, or to relate their stories as an anthropologist might. Rather, I would locate the work inside my own experiences and record the process of my research. 'The Life' as it was called wasn't far from mine." This type of allowed Lacy to capture a more raw reality that surrounds prostitution, thus giving many sex workers a voice and allowing their experiences to be heard. Because Lacy intentionally veered away from a documentary style piece she was able to better understand "[h]er own political and social biases towards prostitution". In 2010 Lacy re-presented Prostitution Notes at the Stephanie Gallery in London. She collaborated with Peter Kirby to perform a reading of her diagrams alongside a video, which Kirby worked on, showing 1970s photos of LA streets, pictures of her original diagrams, and a video of a woman tracing over the lines of her diagrams. The presentation was meant to pay tribute to the ethics that constantly serve as a foundation for Lacy's work. In 2019 she explained, "I don't care as much about art as I care about human trafficking" summing up her beliefs and stance on the treatment of sex workers in America.

== Writing and publishing ==
In 1977, Lacy became an associate of the Women's Institute for Freedom of the Press (WIFP). An American nonprofit publishing organization, it works to increase communication between women and connect the public with forms of women-based media.

She is the editor of Mapping the Terrain: New Genre Public Art, an anthology of essays about the impact of performance art in public spaces. She has also written articles on performance art.

Lacy has consistently written about her work: planning, describing, and analyzing it; advocating socially engaged art practices; theorizing the relationship between art and social intervention; and questioning the boundaries separating high art from popular participation. By bringing together thirty texts that Lacy has written since 1974, Lacy's Book, offers an intimate look at the development of feminist, conceptual, and performance art since those movements' formative years. In the introduction, the art historian Moira Roth provides a helpful overview of Lacy's art and writing, which in the afterword the cultural theorist Kerstin Mey situates in relation to contemporary public art practices.

== Academia ==
Lacy has held several positions at academic institutions focusing on the arts. She was the Dean of Fine Arts at California College of the Arts (CCA) from 1987 to 1997. Lacy was a founding faculty member at California State University, Monterey Bay and founding director of the Center for Fine Art and Public Life. She served as the Chair of Fine Arts at Otis College of Art and Design from 2002 to 2006, before designing and launching a Master of Fine Arts program in Public Practice for the college in 2007. As of 2018, she is a professor of art at the USC Roski School of Art and Design of the University of Southern California.

== Recognition ==
Lacy has won numerous fellowships, including several from the National Endowment for the Arts, a Guggenheim Fellowship, a Creative Capital Emerging Fields Award and the Lila Wallace Arts International Fellowship. She was the first recipient of the Public Art Dialogue Annual Award in 2009. She received the Distinguished Artist Award for Lifetime Achievement from the College Art Association in 2010 and the Lifetime Achievement Award from the Women's Caucus for Art in 2012. She received A Blade of Grass fellowship in 2015.

== Exhibitions ==
- Suzanne Lacy: Togæther, 12 September 2025–8 March 2026, Sakıp Sabancı Museum, Istanbul; Lacy’s first exhibition in Turkey, surveying more than five decades of feminist, participatory and socially engaged practice.
- Committed to Print, January 31 – April 19, 1988
- Video Art: A History, October 3, 1983 – January 3, 1984

== Books ==
- Mapping the Terrain: New Genre Public Art. Seattle, WA, Bay Press, 1996.
- Suzanne Lacy: Gender Agendas. Milano, Italy, Mousse Publishing, 2015.
- With Roth, Moira, and Mey, Kerstin. Leaving Art: Writings on Performance, Politics, and Publics 1974–2007. Durham, London, Duke University Press, 2010.
- Rape Is. Los Angeles, CA, Women's Graphic Center, 1976.
- With Irish, Sharon. Suzanne Lacy: Spaces Between. University of Minnesota Press, 2010.

== Video/ Film Projects ==
External videos
- Suzanne Lacy in the Video Data Bank
- A Conversation with Judy Chicago and Suzanne Lacy on YouTube
- Woman's Building History: Suzanne Lacy (Otis College) on YouTube
- In Mourning and In Rage performance on YouTube
- Three Weeks in May on YouTube

- Lacy was interviewed for the film !Women Art Revolution.
- Lacy, Suzanne. Cotts, Virginia. Baughan, Michelle. Art Institute of Chicago, Video Data Bank; Bedford Hills Correctional Facility (N.Y). Auto Body. Publisher: Chicago III, Video Data Bank, 1998.
- Lacy, Suzanne. Baughan, Michelle. Art Institute of Chicago, Video Data Bank. Making the Crystal Quilt. Publisher: Chicago III, Video Data Bank, 1998.
- Lacy, Suzanne. Moragne, David. Morales, Julio Cesar. Holland, Unique. Baughan, Michelle. Code 33: Emergency: Clear the Air. Publisher: Chicago III, Video Data Bank, 2002.
- Lacy, Suzanne. Whisper, the waves, the wind: Celebrating Older Women. Publisher: Chicago III, Video Data Bank, 1986.

== Collections ==
Her work is owned by the Museum of Contemporary Art in Los Angeles (Prostitution Notes) and The Tate Modern (The Crystal Quilt). In 2012, the Hammer Museum acquired Three Weeks in May (1977).
