= Woman's Building (Los Angeles) =

Former non-profit arts and education center in California

- Interactive map of Woman's Building
- Location: 1727 N. Spring Street, Los Angeles, California, United States
- Coordinates: 34.0702°N 118.2264°W
- Type: Art center Community center
- Events: Feminist art Contemporary art Women's movement

Construction
- Opened: November 28, 1973
- Closed: 1991

Website
- http://thewomansbuilding.org/

The Woman's Building was a non-profit arts and education center located in Los Angeles, California. The Woman's Building focused on feminist art and served as a venue for the women's movement and was spearheaded by artist Judy Chicago, graphic designer Sheila Levrant de Bretteville and art historian Arlene Raven. The center was open from 1973 until 1991. During its existence, the Los Angeles Times called the Woman's Building a "feminist mecca."

== History ==
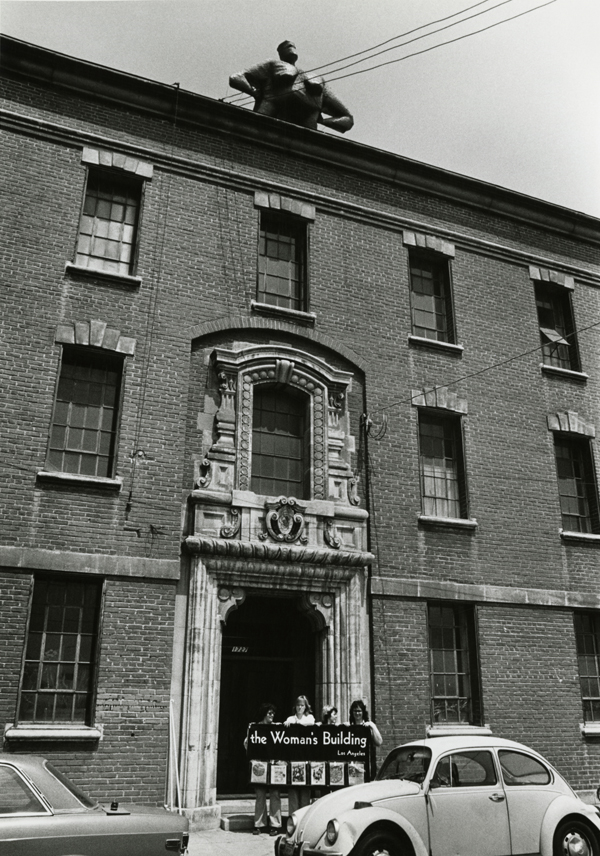
Woman's Building, c. 1978

=== Feminist Studio Workshop ===
The time: mid-'70s. The place: the Feminist Studio Workshop, later to become the Woman's Building.

The quest: to find themselves, to make art, to change the culture.

— Jan Breslauer, 1992

In 1973, CalArts teachers artist Judy Chicago, graphic designer Sheila Levrant de Bretteville and art historian Arlene Raven were finally finished with trying to offer feminist education in a male-dominated institution like CalArts. That year, they quit CalArts and founded the Feminist Studio Workshop (FSW). FSW was one of the first independent art schools for women, and revolved around a workshop environment, allowing women to develop their artistic skills and knowledge outside a traditional educational environment. The vision of FSW was that art should not be separated from activities related to the women's movement. Students were encouraged to collaborate with each other, pooling together their different skills and resources to work on the same art projects. FSW originally met in de Bretteville's home, and in November 1973, the three women began renting a workshop space in a vacant building near MacArthur Park, calling it the Woman's Building after a building from the 1893 World's Columbian Exposition. FSW sublet space in the building to performance art groups, the Sisterhood Bookstore, the Associated Women's Press, local chapters of the National Organization for Women and the Women's Liberation Union, and three galleries: Womanspace Gallery, Gallery 707, and Grandview. The building's goal included having multiple female artists represented in a registry cataloging them. The way they went about adding female artists to the registry is by allowing other female visual artists to submit ten slides of their work, a resume, and information about themselves in order to be considered to be added to the registry. The registry they created included the "[artists'] books, resumes, correspondence, postcards, and samples of [their] art in the form of sketches, drawings, and prints" from 1970 to 1992.

=== New building ===
In 1975, the building that FSW was renting was sold, and they, along with the other tenants, moved to a former Standard Oil Company building from the 1920s. In the 1940s, the building had been converted into a warehouse, consisting of three floors of open space, making it ideal for FSW's classes and exhibitions. The space was the first arts organization to locate itself in downtown Los Angeles, contributing to the revitalization of the area during the 1970s and 1980s. FSW became the main tenant as the previous smaller tenants left, and decided to hire an administrator and create a board of directors to handle the growth of the organization. FSW obtained funding from memberships, tuition, fund-raising and grants.

One of Kate Millett's statues that she had originally created for her work Naked Ladies was installed on top of the building in 1978 to commemorate the fifth anniversary of the art center.

Numerous programs and groups formed out of FSW. They offered a two-year program in interdisciplinary arts, such as performing, graphics, video and writing. Deena Metzger started the writing program which included an ongoing writing series. Readers in the series included Meridel LeSueur, Honor Moore, Audre Lorde, and Adrienne Rich. They also hosted large-scale exhibitions, media and social events. From 1976 to 1980 the Feminist Art Workers toured the Midwest with interactive performance and installation artworks. A performance group called the Waitresses formed, who performed in restaurants using the waitress as a metaphor for women in society. The Incest Awareness Project consisted of a series of interactive exhibitions from 1978–79, including a video installation, Equal Time and Equal Space, directed by Nancy Angelo, in which audience members would sit surrounded by video monitors playing videos of incest survivors sharing their experiences. A group piece, In Mourning and in Rage, created by Suzanne Lacy and Leslie Labowitz, featured 10 tall women, wearing 7-foot-tall head extensions, draped in black, standing on the steps of the Los Angeles City Hall. Each woman represented a victim of the Hillside Strangler and a statistic of violence against women. Works such as these are credited with shaping the contemporary performance art scene. Another collective, Mother Art, created installations and performances that addressed the issues their members faced as both mothers and artists.

In 1977, building co-founder Arlene Raven, formed the Lesbian Art Project with students who felt their artwork contained queer themes and content in order to highlight the contributions by lesbian artists.

Artist Sheila Levrant de Bretteville designed a necklace of an eyebolt on a chain, meant to represent "strength without a fist"; members of the FSW in 1978-79 made 500 of these necklaces to celebrate the 5th anniversary of the Woman's Building.

In 1979, artists from the Woman's Building issued a nationwide call for lesbian artists to organize exhibitions of their work as part of the Great American Lesbian Art Show (GALAS).

=== Final decade ===
Sheila Levrant de Bretteville's poster for the Women in Design conference held at the Woman's Building in 1975. Woman's Building records, Archives of American Art, Smithsonian Institution.

In 1981, the Feminist Studio Workshop closed, due to the diminishing demand for alternative education. With FSW's closure, the programs of the Woman's Building were altered to cater to the needs of working women. The building's hours were reduced and two thirds of it rented to artists for studio space. That year, all three of the founding members left, and former students Terry Wolverton, Sue Maberry and Cheri Gaulke led the organization. They also began the Vesta Awards, an annual fundraiser. The performance group Sisters of Survival, which formed in 1981, exhibited and toured across the United States and Europe to protest nuclear weapon proliferation. That year, the Woman's Building founded the Women's Graphic Center Typesetting and Design, a for-profit business designed to strengthen their finances and support the artistic endeavors of the Building. They provided phototypesetting, graphic design, production and printing services.

However, in 1988 the Women's Graphic Center closed, and the income for staff salaries disappeared. Wolverton served as sole executive director from 1988 to April 1989 before leaving. Pauli De Witt replaced Wolverton, staying only briefly and failing to rescue the organization financially. After she left, a 13-member board ran the Woman's Building. The Woman's Building never recovered and despite pushes to move to another location, they closed the gallery and performance space in 1991. They continued to hold the Vesta Awards, with keynote speaker Lucy Lippard and proceeds going towards an oral history of the organization.

== Legacy ==
In 1991, Sandra Golvin, president of the board of directors, donated the Woman's Building records to the Smithsonian's Archives of American Art. Other archival collections of materials are at the Getty Research Institute and the ONE Archives, both in Los Angeles.

The Woman's Building and its legacy was the subject of a major exhibition called Doin It In Public: Feminism and Art at the Woman's Building at the Ben Maltz Gallery at Otis College of Art and Design in 2011/2012. The exhibition was part of the Getty initiative, Pacific Standard Time. The exhibition was accompanied by a two-volume catalog, and a website that includes historical information about the Woman's Building. On June 8, 2018, the L.A. City Council designated the Woman's Building as a Historic Cultural Monument. The building was listed on the National Register of Historic Places in 2026.

== See also ==
- Women-only space
- Women's Graphic Center
