= Schiffman =

Schiffman, Schiffmann or Shiffman is a surname. Notable people with the surname include:

- Adir Shiffman (born 1974), Australian entrepreneur and business executive
- Bernard Shiffman (born 1942), American mathematician
- Daniel Shiffman (born 1973), American computer programmer and NYU professor
- David Shiffman (1923–1982), Israeli politician
- Erich Schiffmann (born 1953), American yoga master
- Glenn H. Schiffman (born 1970/71), American businessman and philanthropist
- Guillaume Schiffman, French cinematographer
- Jade Schiffman, American ophthalmologist and tennis player
- Lawrence Schiffman (born 1948), American professor
- Max Shiffman (1914–2000), American mathematician
- Minna Lachs (1907–1993), Austrian educator memoirist
- Nate Shiffman (born 1991), American soccer player and entrepreneur
- Rebecca Schiffman, American singer-songwriter, jewelry designer and visual artist
- Robert Schiffmann (1935–2024), American inventor and writer
- Ronald Shiffman, American city planner, architect, professor and author
- Suzanne Schiffman (1929–2001), French screenwriter and director
- Tony Schiffman (1937–2015), American jewelry dealer

== See also ==
- Schiffman Building, a historic building in Huntsville, Alabama
- Goldsmith–Schiffman Field, a multipurpose stadium in Huntsville, Alabama
