= Schiff =

Schiff is a Jewish and German surname meaning "ship". The Schiffs are known from about 1370, the earliest date to which any contemporary Jewish family can be definitely traced". The Schiff family became a prominent Jewish banking dynasty that rose to prominence in the late-19th and early-20th centuries. Originating from Germany, the Schiff family gained significant influence in American banking through figures like Jacob H. Schiff, who headed Kuhn, Loeb & Co. from 1885 to 1920. Jacob Schiff played a crucial role in financing major U.S. railroads and in supporting Japan during the Russo-Japanese War of 1904 to 1905. The Schiff family was also involved in philanthropic efforts, particularly in Jewish causes and institutions. Their legacy is marked by contributions to finance, politics, and philanthropy.

The Schiff and Rothschild families were closely linked through shared heritage and proximity, particularly in the Jewish ghetto of Frankfurt during the 19th century. Both families resided in the Judengasse (Jews' Alley), the Jewish quarter of Frankfurt, which was notorious for its cramped conditions and restrictive policies towards Jewish inhabitants.

The Rothschilds' family home, known as the House of the Green Shield (German: zum Grünen Schild), became their business center as well as their residence. Mayer Amschel Rothschild (c. 1743 - 1812) started his banking empire from this home, and it became a symbol of the family's growing financial influence. The Schiff family, also of Jewish banking lineage, lived in the same home and had close connections with the Rothschilds. Jacob Schiff, a key figure in the Schiff family, grew up in this environment and later became a powerful banker in his own right, forging strong ties with the Rothschilds through their shared business and cultural roots.

The Schiff family's ties with the Rothschilds were not only social but also professional, as Jacob Schiff's career path in the banking world paralleled that of the Rothschilds, with both families contributing to international finance. Schiff's later involvement in Kuhn, Loeb & Co. in New York and his support for global causes echoed the Rothschild legacy in Europe. This connection was reflected in the mutual respect and shared Jewish identity between the two families, who both played significant roles in shaping financial markets during the 19th and early 20th centuries.

== People ==
- Adam Schiff (born 1960), American politician from California
- András Schiff (born 1953), Hungarian pianist
- Arthur Schiff (1940–2006), American infomercial copywriter
- David Schiff (born 1945), American composer
- Don Schiff (born 1955), American composer and musician
- Dorothy Schiff (1903–1989), American newspaper proprietor
- Frieda Schiff Warburg (1876–1958), American philanthropist
- Gary Schiff (born 1972), American politician
- Georgia Schiff (born 2004), American ice hockey player
- Heinrich Schiff (1951–2016), Austrian cellist
- Hugo Schiff (1834–1915), German chemist who discovered Schiff base and Schiff test
- Irwin Schiff (1928–2015), American tax protester
- Jacob Schiff (1847–1920), German-born American banker
- Jeffrey Schiff, American artist
- John M. Schiff (1904–1987), American banker and scout leader
- Karenna Gore Schiff (born 1973), American author and journalist
- Leonard I. Schiff (1915–1971), American physicist
- Lonny Schiff (born 1929), American artist
- Louis H. Schiff (born 1955) American judge
- Moritz Schiff (1823–1896), German biologist
- Mortimer L. Schiff (1877–1931), American banker and scout leader
- Nadine Schiff, Canadian film producer and writer
- Naftali Schiff, British rabbi
- Naomi Schiff (born 1994), Rwandan-Belgian racing driver
- Nathan Schiff (born 1963), American filmmaker
- Otto Schiff (fencer) (1892–1978), Dutch fencer
- Otto Schiff (humanitarian) (1875–1952), philanthropist, British Hero of the Holocaust
- Paul Schiff, American film producer
- Pearl Schiff (1916–2005), American author
- Peter Schiff (born 1963), American stockbroker, financial analyst, and author
- Richard Schiff (born 1955), American actor
- Robert Schiff (1854–1940), Italian chemist
- Robin Schiff, American writer and producer
- Sol Schiff (1917–2012), American table tennis player
- Stacy Schiff (born 1961), American writer
- Stephen Schiff, American writer
- Steven Schiff (1947–1998), American politician
- Sydney Schiff (Stephen Hudson) (1868–1944), British translator and novelist
- Tevele Schiff (died 1791), British rabbi
- Ze'ev Schiff (1932–2007), Israeli journalist

== Fictional characters ==
- Adam Schiff (Law & Order), a character in the Law & Order franchise
- The Schiff, a species of characters in the anime series Blood+

== See also ==
- Schiffer
- Schiffmann
