= Otto Schiff =

Otto Schiff may refer to:

- Otto Schiff (fencer)
- Otto Schiff (humanitarian)
