= Roger Katan =

French-American artist and architect

Roger G. Katan
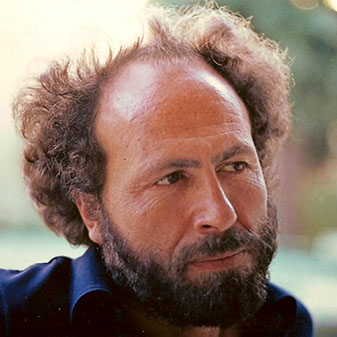
- Katan in New York c. 1967
- Born: Berguent (Ain Bni Mathar), Morocco
- Education: Massachusetts Institute of Technology, Boston Ecole Nationale des Beaux-Arts, Paris
- Known for: Visual arts and architecture: lives and works in Sauve, France
- Notable work: Building Together, New Village Press, 2014 Bâtir ensemble, CILF, 1988 De quoi se mêlent les urbanistes?, Actes Sud, 1979
- Movement: Advocacy Planning, Kinetic art
- Website: Handmade Houses Kinetic Sculpture

Roger G. Katan is a French-American architect, planner, sculptor, and activist born in Berguent (today's Aïn Bni Mathar), Eastern Morocco, on January 5, 1931. Based in the United States in the early 1960s, he was an active founder of advocacy planning, participatory democracy applied to urban planning. As a kinetic artist, he collaborated and exhibited with rising figures of postmodern art. After 1975, Katan became involved in humanitarian relief and continued to encourage participatory practices and self-management. His method favors traditional, sustainable agriculture and construction. In 1999 he moved to Sauve, southern France, where he resumed work on kinetic sculpture and publications.

== Biography ==
After graduating from Ecole nationale supérieure des Beaux-Arts in Paris, Katan won a scholarship to MIT in 1960, where he earned a master's degree in Architecture and Urban Design (1961). From 1961 to 1963, he worked for Louis Kahn in Philadelphia. From 1964 to 1975, he lived and worked in New York City. Based in East Harlem, he taught architecture and urban planning at Pratt Institute, City College of New York, and Pratt Graduate School of Tropical Architecture for ten years, with one year spent at Vassar College, Poughkeepsie, NY (in the Political Science Department), practicing and teaching advocacy planning. He created, with Pratt and City College graduate students, one of the first Community Design Centers, offering free technical assistance to community organizations.

He supported the Civil Rights Movement and the students' claim for social responsibility. In 1964, Katan was already prescribing participation and putting his talent as an architect in the service of the poorest when Paul Davidoff tossed the phrase advocacy planning. Concurrently, Katan's publications and conferences helped spread the word throughout the United-States, Europe, and beyond. He was invited by student organizations calling for social change. His talks included Yale, Harvard, MIT, Berkeley, Columbia, etc. Katan obtained American citizenship in 1968.

From 1963 to 1975, Katan was also involved in the art world. As a kinetic sculptor, he exchanged views and exhibited with artists such as Allan Kaprow, Roy lichtenstein, and Robert Smithson. The early sixties saw the emergence of Pop Art and the revival of the kinetic movement, initiated in Europe in the 1930s. Using scrap materials like egg cartons, Katan developed structures evoking abstract cities. "Eternized" by a resin bath, his materials captured and reflected natural and artificial light. His sculptures became models of imaginary cities and villages, some of which resemble the artist's birthplace in Morocco.

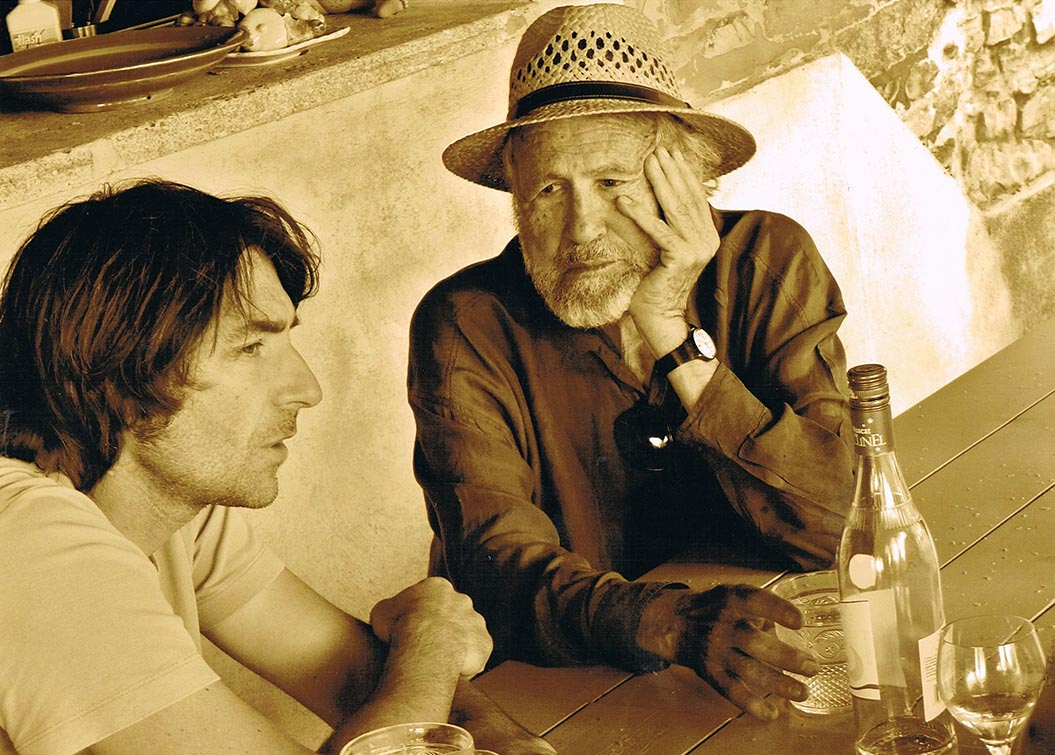
Architect Roger Katan (right) and neurologist Giovanni Castelnovo (left), Gard, France, May 12, 2011

From 1975 to 1999, he was actively involved in humanitarian relief and development as a consultant, mostly in Africa and Latin America, on behalf of the United Nations, the European Union, the World Bank, and the French Technical Cooperation. Faithful to his principles, the advocate planner kept privileging the interests of the people and encouraging self-management. His intervention programs included resettlement, microcredit, education, etc. In both agriculture and construction, Katan has always encouraged traditional methods as well as local, sustainable materials.

Hired by the United Nations Development Program (UNDP), Katan monitored the creation of a local microcredit network in Ouagadougou, Burkina Faso, West Africa, in 1976-78. The network has now grown to become a national organization, Réseau National des Caisses Populaires du Burkina. He supervised a displacement program in Mali in 1978 and the creation of a National Construction Standards Institute (appropriate technology) in Bamako in 1979. After 1980, he was hired on short-term contracts by the European Union, the United Nations, and various NGOs for missions in Central and South America. Katan helped individuals restore their traditions through small self-managed productive projects. In 1980, he advised the Dutch Technical Cooperation in Colombia to rethink rural education and in 1984 Katan built the first New Rural School (Escuela Nueva) for the Colombian government. Over 15,000 rural schools based on this model now exist throughout Latin America.

In 1981 photographs and plans of an adobe house designed by Katan for a displacement in Mali were shown at the Centre Pompidou in Paris. The "Architectures de terre" (Earth Architectures) exhibition was curated by Jean Dethier.

Katan has published two books in French, De quoi se mêlent les urbanistes? (Actes Sud, 1979), about advocacy planning, and Bâtir ensemble (CILF, 1988), a methodology for participatory practice. De quoi se mêlent les urbanistes? was translated into Italian. Construire ensemble received a grant from the Graham Foundation in 2010 for its English translation and update. Building Together was released in the U.S. by New Village Press in 2014, with two new chapters by Ronald Shiffman, founder of the Pratt Center for Community Development in 1963 and pioneer of advocacy planning.

In 1999 Katan moved to Sauve, southern France, where he helped his current wife Julie, a ceramic artist, and Aline Crumb, a comic strip artist, launch their art gallery, Galerie VP. There Katan has exhibited his early kinetic works together with his latest sculptures. His new works use state-of-the-art technology, including plastics, LED, and Wireless devices.

== Education ==
Katan attended primary school in Berguent (today's Aïn Bni Mathar), Eastern Morocco, near the Algerian border, whose population was then about 800.

- 1943-1949: Secondary education in Meknes and Oujda, Morocco. Aged 17, Katan won the Oujda High School logo competition and decided to study architecture.
- 1951-1953: Ecole supérieure des Beaux-Arts d'Alger (Algiers School of Fine Arts). Trained for competitive entrance examinations.
- 1954-1957: Ecole nationale supérieure des Beaux-Arts, Paris. Katan would travel in France and work for architects to pay for his studies and visit two or three European countries every year.
- 1959: Licensed architect's degree (DPLG), Ecole nationale supérieure des Beaux-Arts, Paris.
- 1957-1960: Military service in Paris during the war in Algeria.
- Late 1960: Grunsfeld Fellowship for a semester at the Massachusetts Institute of Technology and a study travel in the United States.
- 1961-1962: Master's degree in Architecture and Urban Design from the MIT, supervised by Imre Halasz and Lawrence B. Anderson. Katan also spent a semester traveling across the United States, studying works by Frank Lloyd Wright among other.

== Architect and Advocate Planner (United States, 1960-76) ==
Dore Ashton wrote in her cultural guidebook about New York:

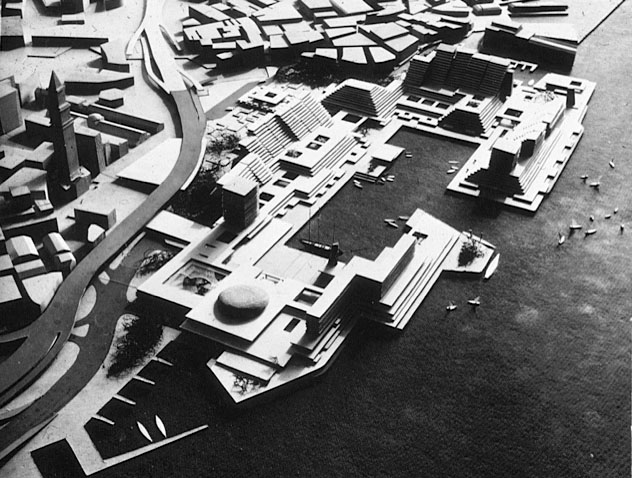
Katan's first prize-winning proposal for the Boston waterfront (maquette), 1961.

"Some of the advocacy planners, such as Roger Katan, insist that the architect can function only if he is prepared to extend himself to activities which were previously considered beyond his realm of competence. Katan's attitude is a long way from the aristocratic distance of a Richardson, whose clients took his word for law, and were always rich. Katan's clients are the community as a whole; they are mostly the very poor in the ghettoes of Harlem, and they share with him the planner's task. . . . By helping them to organize themselves and state their needs coherently, Katan is able to develop plans which make sense. He also recognizes the necessity of learning the intricacies of city bureaucracy, and how to deal with the political aspects of each citizen's existence. Over the years—he has lived in East Harlem for some seven years—Katan has slowly developed a number of alternative plans for rehabilitation and rebuilding in his neighbourhood."

- 1955-1960 : Worked on various projects for architectural firms in France and Africa, including:
  - Hospital and city hall of Saint-Lô, Normandy, destroyed by WWII bombing,
  - Collège St Joseph, Dordogne, France,
  - Housing competitions in Paris,
  - Study for 2 dams on the Rhine river,
  - French military base in Niamey, Niger (housing, restaurant, amphitheater, and hospital),
  - Won competition for 3000 dwelling units with community and health facilities for US Army bases in France,
  - Study for 100 social housing units in Bir Mourad Raïs (formerly Birmandreis), near Algiers,
  - Optical store in Toulouse, France,
  - Duplex dry-cleaning center in Paris,
  - Villa Lehalle, Paradou, Algiers (1959),
  - Huet residence, Toulon, France,
  - 2-family residence project in Toulouse, France.
- 1961: First prize of the Boston waterfront competition. This project was part of his master's degree at MIT. It was shown at the Faneuil Hall. It was originally inspired by Honfleur, Normandy, where each house overlooks the harbor. In the Boston project for 2000 housing units, stepped terraces planted with greenery offered each family a view of the harbor. Families could choose their surface and develop it according to their income.
- 1962-1964: Works for Louis Kahn in Philadelphia, Pennsylvania. Introduced by Prof. Lawrence B. Anderson, Katan worked for Louis Kahn's studio for two years and taught architecture and planning at Pratt Institute once a week. Katan occasionally assisted Louis Kahn during his weekly graduate seminars at the University of Pennsylvania. Participated or was in charge of:
  - Salk Institute for Biological Studies, La Jolla, California,
  - Master plan for Center City, Philadelphia, and Dhaka, Bangladesh,
  - Presidential palace in Islamabad, Pakistan,
  - Science Research Building, University of Virginia,
  - Center for Performing Arts, Ft. Wayne, Indiana.
- 1965: Project for a medical cooperative in Antony (Berny), France, near Paris. Practice and housing facilities for 8 doctors and 2 interns.
- 1964-1976: Director of Environmental Resource Associates (356 East 116th Street, East Harlem, New York City), one of the first Community Design Centers. Katan left Philadelphia and moved to East Harlem, where he started working on the creation of a community center and housing project for senior citizens. He put his talent in the service of the poorest, got involved in the civil rights movement, the student struggle for greater social responsibility, advocating the active participation of residents.
- 1964-1968: Brooklyn Bridge and East Harlem Triangle Gateways. Proposal for a system of gateways to connect Manhattan bridges and tunnels. Traffic flows were analyzed for better distribution. New pedestrian and leisure spaces were designed. Specific studies for Brooklyn Bridge and 3 bridges of the East Harlem Triangle were published in the form of 2 brochures (32 and 38 pages respectively), financed by the Kaplan Fund, Inc.
  - Milbank renewal project: A counterproposal by residents against the City's project. Publication of a 20-page brochure presented to the City of New York.
  - 116th Street renewal project: A study financed by the City of New York. Publication of a 40-page brochure presented to the City of New York.
  - East Harlem Summer Festival: Initiated in July 1969, it was held each year for more than 10 years. Funded by the New York City Council for the Arts, the Festival was meant to enhance residents' participation through leisure activities and improve their living environment.
  - Project for a multiservice center in East Harlem: After consultation with representatives of various associations, Katan was contracted by the City of New York for the creation of health, education, and leisure facilities, including offices combining social services.
  - Corsi House: A neighborhood association was funded by the City of New York to develop a community center and 150 units for senior citizens on 116th Street in East Harlem.
  - Wards Island Psychiatric Hospital renewal plan (4000 beds): Katan was contracted by the New York State Office of Mental Health to provide an alternative to a previously abandoned 1000-bed expansion plan. His counterproposal, supported by elected residents, recommended to decentralize Wards Island Psychiatric Hospital and create small extensions in Harlem and East Harlem.

== Architecture and Planning Educator (New York, 1964-75) ==
- 1964-1974: Taught architecture and urban planning at Pratt Institute, City College of New York, and Pratt Graduate School of Tropical Architecture for ten years. In East Harlem he created, with Pratt and City College graduate students, one of the first Community Design Centers, offering free technical assistance to community organizations.
- 1968-1969: Invited lecturer at Vassar College, Poughkeepsie, NY, in the Political Science Department, he offered both a practical and theoretical approach to advocacy planning.
- 1970-1971: Invited lecturer at Hunter College, New York. Students were asked to carry out a comprehensive socio-economic and physical survey of East Harlem and Ward Island, supervised by community representatives.

== French Department of the Environment and Construction (France, 1976-79) ==
- 1976-1979: Based in Aix-en-Provence between missions in Burkina Faso, Katan was consultant to the French Department of the Environment and Construction (Ministère de l'Environnement et du Cadre de Vie, Direction de la Construction). Based on his own experience in the United States, he studied and developed a methodology for participatory practice. This study resulted in two volumes: De quoi se mêlent les urbanistes? (1979), about advocacy planning, and Bâtir ensemble (1988), a methodology of participatory practice.

== Consultant in Africa and South America (1976-98) ==
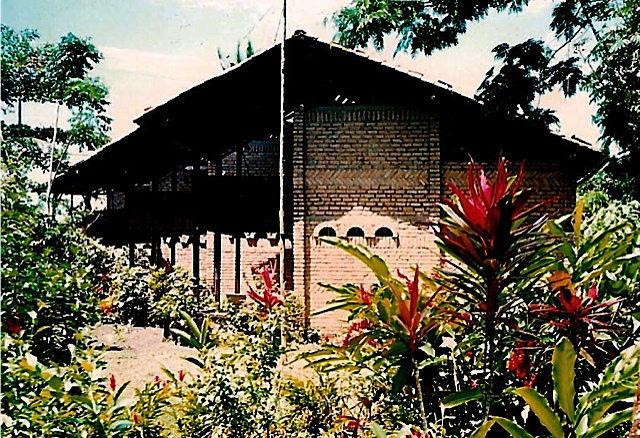
Pacific Coast Cluster Homes (Cabanons), Bocana-Buenaventura, Colombia, 1991-93

- 1976-78: United Nations Development Program (UNDP) missions in Burkina Faso, West Africa. Katan carried out three 4-month missions for UNDP to set up a local microcredit and savings bank. Originally devised as a self-management tool for the Cissin district (20,000 people) in Ouagadougou, it has now become the Réseau National des Caisses Populaires du Burkina, a nationwide network.
- 1977: UNDP mission in Benin, West Africa, Nov. 2 to 23.
- 1979-80: Two UNDP missions in Mali, West Africa, from Feb. 1979 to March 1980. A 12-month mission to coordinate the displacement of 15 village communities during the construction of a power dam in Sélingué. On this occasion, Katan was interviewed by a young Belgian journalist, Christine Ockrent. It took Katan another 4-month mission in Mali to launch a National Construction Standards Institute in Bamako. Katan designed and built the UNDP headquarters in Sélingué using earth and local materials. It served as a model for the rehousing program. Photographs and plans were shown in Paris at the “Architectures de terre” (Earth Architecture) exhibition organized by Jean Dethier at Centre Pompidou in 1981. On this occasion, Katan lectured about earth architecture and his work in Mali.
- 1980-99: Missions in South and Central America. Based in Colombia, Katan carried out short missions in Mexico and Chile for the European Union and the French Technical Cooperation.
- 1981: During a 3-month mission in Colombia for the Dutch Technical Cooperation, Katan studied the cause of demographic and economic disorders in villages located in three different areas of the Chocó department, on the Pacific Coast. The main cause was the absence of appropriate rural teaching. Schools were based on urban life conditions. Katan returned to Chocó in 1984, invited by the Education Department, UNESCO, and CVC to set up a model school for the Pacific Coast, where rural teaching would help local development.
- 1982: Katan developed 3 projects with the French Technical Cooperation in Colombia from May 15 to July 15.
- 1982: He designed and built a private residence made of sustainable materials (adobe, straw, bamboo, etc.) in the Andes, an hour's drive from Bogota.
- 1983: Katan represented France in a project identification commission for the World Bank's Urban Development program in Bogota, Jan. 5-31.
- 1983-84: Katan performed various tasks for the French Ministry of Foreign Affairs and Technical Cooperation through the Agency for Cooperation and Development and the Inter-Ministerial Cooperation Program REXCOOP to provide technical assistance to the ICT (Instituto de Credito Territorial) mounting a project for 3,600 self-built wooden houses in Tumaco, on the Pacific Coast. Subsequently, he was in charge of organizing the initial phase (250 houses) with participating beneficiaries in the design, construction, and project management. In Feb.-March, Katan launched 3 cooperatives (savings, transportation, consumer goods) with the same people for the French Technical Cooperation.
- 1984: Hired by BCH (Banco Central Hipotecario), Katan assessed the social impact of popular housing projects in Cali and Cartagena, defining the type of training required to manage such projects in an urban context.
- 1985-86: With the mayor and municipality of Tumaco, he worked on the co-financing of three projects: a self-managed housing cooperative for 200 families in a semi-rural area, a cooperative hotel in Bocagrande, near Tumaco, hiring local people and using sustainable power, with its own local livestock, biogas digesters, vegetable garden, windmill, bungalows, cooperative restaurant, etc., and a multi-purpose cooperative union of oil palm growers.
- 1986: Katan set up the self-built cooperative hotel project in Tumaco-Bocagrande. He developed a collaborative conceptual plan and coordinated the construction with the support of the DC-based Inter-American Foundation.
- 1987-89: He developed plans and supervised the construction of an International Research Center for Clinical Psychology (6500 sq. feet) in Cali, Colombia, using improved traditional materials (wood, adobe, bamboo). The project was financed by the Danielle Mitterrand Foundation (France Libertés - Fondation Danielle-Mitterrand). Concurrently, Katan designed and built an experimental house in Bocana (Buenaventura) and two private homes made of improved traditional materials in Cali.
- 1989-93: From September 1989 to June 1994, he was an advisor to a number of organizations for development, including CECAN and its technical school in Cali, where he developed and operated training workshops (metalwork, car mechanics, joinery, carpentry, etc.) for unprivileged Cali youngsters aged 16 to 24. He also carried out a training project in construction and production of building materials with the same organization.
- 1989-93: Katan launched a small business manufacturing ceramic elements for construction (tiles, bricks, roof tiles, etc.) in Bocana-Buenaventura, on the Pacific Coast. After only six months, this two-men workshop produced 32,000 bricks and 20,000 tiles baked in a custom-made driftwood oven. Katan built two duplex bungalows in 1991-92 and two more in June 1993 using these materials.
- October 1991: Katan carried out an assessment mission for the European Community. The project planned 600 self-built houses in an urban area destroyed by the Popayán earthquake of 1987.
- December 1991: He was hired by the EEC to carry out a mission to assess the possibility to develop "small productive projects" on the Pacific Coast and evaluate the needs for technical assistance.
- Summer 1992: EEC's "small productive projects" for the Pacific Coast. Katan trained 12 people to build and operate five brick and tile ovens.

== Publications ==
=== Personal publications ===
- 1960: Projet de coopérative médicale près de Bourg-la-Reine / A Medical Cooperative Located in the Vicinity of Bourg-la-Reine, Seine, France. Ecole nationale supérieure des Beaux-Arts de Paris. Translated for MIT's Department of Architecture in June 1961.
- 1962: "Le Fondamentalisme dans l'œuvre de Louis Kahn" (Fundamentalism in the Work of Louis Kahn), L'Architecture d'aujourd'hui, Dec. 1962-Jan. 1963, pp. 1–40, with Elleda Katan. The article investigates Louis Kahn's conceptions of urban planning and "movement."
- 1966: "Minimum Standards vs. Minimum Decency," Architectural Record, Jan. 1966, p. 168-9. Corsi House: a community center and 150 housing units for senior citizens.
- 1966: "The Changing Job to be Done," Architectural Record, July, pp. 235–6. Corsi House (150 senior housing units) and the struggle with the New York Housing Authority.
- 1966: "Architecture and the Kinetic Movement: The work of Roger Katan," Art Voices, summer issue, pp. 74–81.
- 1966: "A Kinetic Museum," Architectural Record, Dec., p. 36, in collaboration with Len Lye.
- 1967: "Prefabrication: Mechanization and Self Expression," Arts Magazine, Sep.-Oct. 1967, p. 22.
- 1967: "New Perspectives in Urban Planning," AM radio forum featuring Roger Katan, Robert Hadley, and Marshall England, WEVD (NY), Oct. 26, 8:00 pm.
- 1967: Pueblos for El Barrio: On the Rejuvenation of an Old Public Housing Site, and Its Integration with the Adjoining Urban Fabric, New York: Nabal Press, Dec. 21. A counterproposal project with the United Residents of Milbank-Frawley Circle-East Harlem Association, a 20-page brochure (500 copies) financed by the Kaplan Fund, Inc. and presented to the City of New York.
- 1967: "Lower Manhattan Plan for Urban Renewal," AM radio forum featuring Roger Katan, Judson Hand, Raymond Rubinow, and Frank Arricale (City Relocation Commissioner), WEVD (NY), Dec. 28, 8:00 pm.
- 1968: "Critical Appraisal and Exhortation—from Two Laymen," with Prof. Reed Whittemore in Oliver Cope (ed.), Man, Mind, and Medicine; The Doctor's Education: A Chairman's View of the Swampscott Study on Behavioral Science in Medicine, 23 October-4 November 1966. Philadelphia, PA & Toronto, ON: J. B. Lippincott, 1968, pp. 135–8.
- 1968: Casper Citron Show (radio broadcast). "The architect Roger Katan discusses the lack of interest for community participation in urban renewal." WLOA-FM (Pittsburgh, PA), Jan. 31, 11:15 pm.
- 1968: "Compact Urban Gateway," The Architectural Forum, April, pp. 72–3. A counterproposal and critical appraisal of the City of New York's Lower Manhattan Plan.
- 1968: "Vox Populi: Many Voices from a Single Community," The Architectural Forum, May, pp. 58–63. On the Milbank-Frawley Circle Renovation Project, East Harlem, New York City.

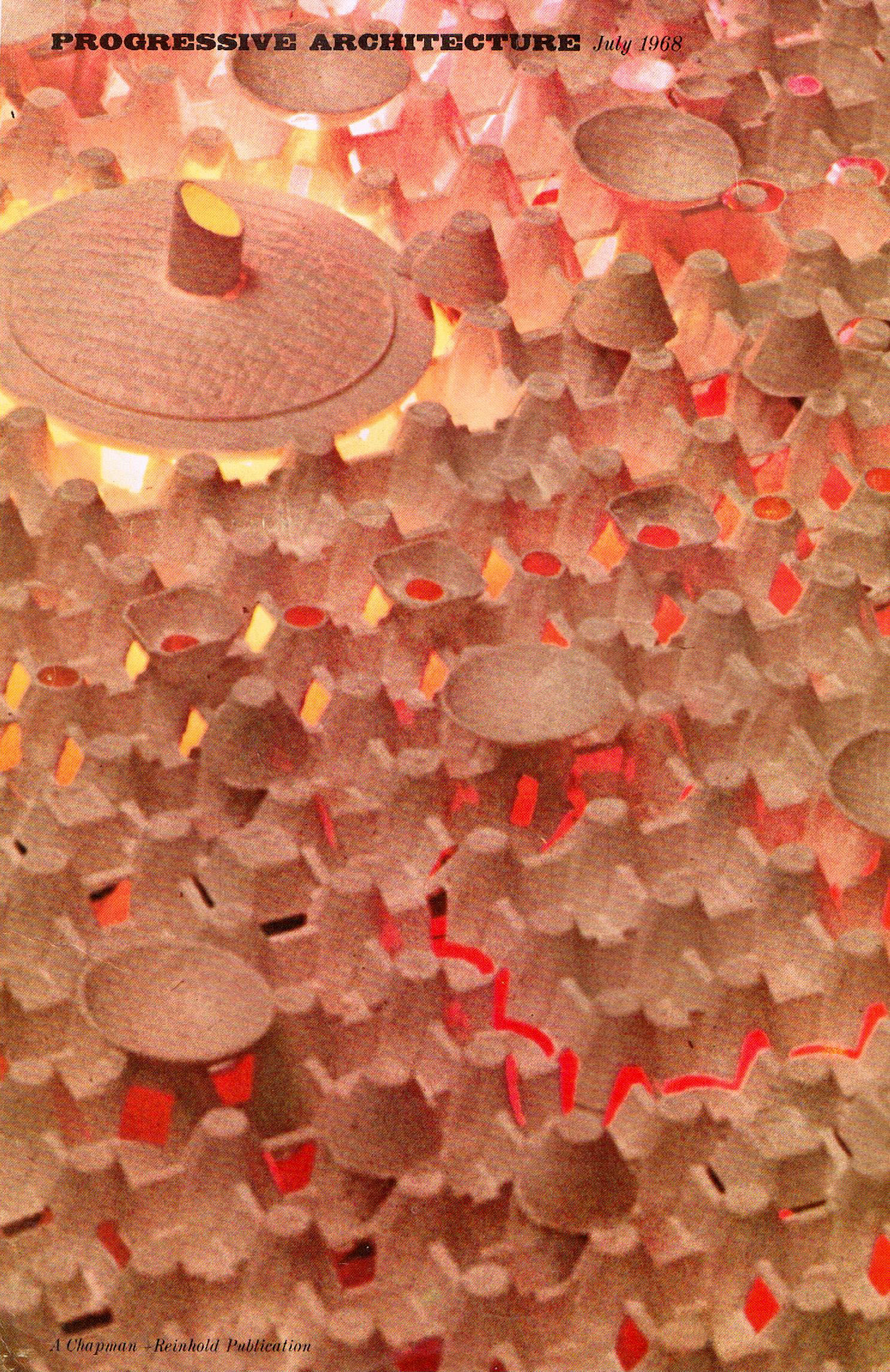
Progressive Architecture, July 1968 (magazine front cover): "Roselights for Whiteville [1966-67], a sculpture by architect Roger Katan, is a study of light and motion integrated into a series of 'megaforms' for an abstract cityscape. Photo: Jon Naar."

- 1968: Progressive Architecture, July issue about megastructures. Magazine cover art.
- 1968: "Washington's Light-Hearted Park Places", Progressive Architecture, Aug., pp. 144–5.
- 1968: "ARCH: Black Advocates," Progressive Architecture, Sep., pp. 107–11. On Katan's East Harlem projects and Triboro Bridge Gateway.
- 1969: Triboro Bridge Gateway, New York: Nabal Press, Feb. A 36-page brochure financed by ARCH. Community's counterporposal for the approaches to the Triboro Bridge linking the three bridges landing in East Harlem.
- 1969: Brooklyn Bridge Gateway, New York: Nabal Press, May. A 40-page brochure (500 copies). A study financed by the Kaplan Fund, Inc., published by the New York Architectural League as a public service. A proposal against the misuse of land and the poor traffic and planning projects at the core of Manhattan's Civic Center.
- 1969: 116th Street Renewal Plan, New York, juin. A 38-page brochure (500 copies) funded by the New York Borough Improvement Board. A proposal for the 116th street renewal of the general business, housing, and recreational area, from East River Drive to 5th Ave.
- 1969: Coney Island, NY, 1970, New York. A 58-page New York City financed social and economic study for Coney Island.
- 1969: Manhattan State Hospital Evaluation, Phase 1 (124 pages) et Phase 2 (84 pages), New York.
- 1969: East Harlem Summer Festival, New York. The Festival and 20-page report were financed by the Graham Foundation and the Kaplan Fund, Inc.
- 1970: Radio interview hosted by Doris Freedman, director of cultural programs, New York City Department of Cultural Affairs. See "Radio: Today's Leading Events," The New York Times, Arts & Leisure, July 12.
- 1971: "Rénovation de la 116^{e} rue," Katan interviewed by Denis Goldschmidt, L' Architecture d'aujourd'hui, Aug., pp. 82–3.
- 1972: From World Fairs to Fair Cities 1976, New York. At the invitation of Avant Garde Magazine, this essay describes Katan's vision of the forthcoming 1976 American Revolution Bicentennial celebration. The 16-page brochure was made possible through the Cooperative Foundation, in cooperation with the Kaplan Fund, Inc.
- 1972: "Planning with People: Advocacy in East Harlem," Forum, vol. XXIII, No.4 (Amsterdam, Pays-Bas), June. 40-page special issue edited by Katan about his work as an advocate planner in East Harlem, with a preface by Françoise Choay.
- 1976: Rapport de mission sur la création d'une caisse populaire d'épargne et de crédit localisée à Cissin (Ouagadougou) / The Creation of the People's Bank in the Cissin District of Ouagadougou, Burkina Faso, West Africa (mission report), 1st four-month mission, Ouagadougou, UNDP. 1976. UN mission report about a project to improve life conditions in the Cissin neighborhood of Ouagadougou. The creation of a microcredit bank in Ouagadougou, Burkina Faso, West Africa.
- 1977: Rapport de mission sur la création d'une caisse populaire d'épargne et de crédit localisée à Cissin (Ouagadougou) / The Creation of the People's Bank in the Cissin District of Ouagadougou, Burkina Faso, West Africa (mission report)', 2nd mission (Oct. 5, 1976 - Jan. 20, 1977), Ouagadougou, UNDP.
- 1977: Bâtir la ville avec les usagers, Aix-en-Provence, Aménagement Méditerranée Documentation (AMEDOC). Report for the French Department of Environment and Construction. 4 vol., 560 pages.
- 1978: Rapport de mission sur la création d'une caisse populaire d'épargne et de crédit localisée à Cissin (Ouagadougou) / The Creation of the People's Bank in the Cissin District of Ouagadougou, Burkina Faso, West Africa '(mission report)', 3rd mission (Dec. 27, 1977 - March 1, 1978), Ouagadougou, UNDP.
- 1979: De quoi se mêlent les urbanistes? Le Paradou: Actes Sud (108 pages).
- 1980: "The Creation of the People's Bank in the Cissin District of Ouagadougou," (English) African Environment, Environment Training Programme, International African Institute, pp. 501-8.
- 1980: "La création de la caisse populaire du quartier Cissin à Ouagadougou," (French) Environnement africain, Marie Hélène Mottin-Sylla (éd.), Dakar: ENDA, 1980, pp. 511-8.
- 1982: Che fanno gli urbanisti? Italian translation by Maria and Raffaele Licinio, Bari: Edizioni Dedalo (96 pages).
- 1982: "Vers une architecture appropriée" (Toward an Appropriate Architecture), Techniques et architecture (Ecole Nationale Supérieure d'architecture de Grenoble), Dec. 1982-Jan. 1983, pp. 67–73. An experience of self-construction in Colombia, South America.
- 1984: Projet Tumaco (Tumaco Project), mission reports (July 1–9 and Aug. 11-30, 1983 / Nov.-Dec. 1983 / Feb. 17-27, 1984). Paris: Agence Coopération et Aménagement (ACA), 164 p.
- 1988: Bâtir ensemble, Paris: Conseil international de la langue française in collaboration with the Institut International d'Architecture Méditerranéen (264 pages).
- 2014: Building Together: Case Studies in Participatory Planning and Community Building, New York: New Village Press. Updated English version of Bâtir ensemble, with 2 additional chapters by Ron Shiffman and forewords by Dore Ashton and Kenneth Reardon.
- 2016: "Participative Mindscapes", Arts, Vol.5, Issue 1, March 2016 (MDPI Open Access Journal).

=== Publications about his work ===
- 1959: Journal de la SADG, Oct. Project for an international center. SADG (Société des Architectes Diplômés par le Gouvernement) became SFA (Française des Architectes) in 1979.
- 1963: Le Monde, mars, p. 4. A review of Roger and Elleda Katan's article about Louis Kahn's work in the United States.
- 1965: Brian O'Doherty (ed.), Art '65: Lesser Known and Unknown Painters / Young American Sculpture - East to West (exhibition cat., American Express Pavilion, New York World's Fair, Apr. 21-Oct. 17), New York: Star Press, p. 114.
- 1966: Charlotte Willard, "Searcher for Truth," New York Post, May 14, p. 14.
- 1967: Dan Graham, "Models and Monuments: The Plague of Architecture," Arts Magazine, March 1967 (A Minimal Future?), p. 33.
- 1967: "N.Y. Fair Features Art Show," Herald American (Syracuse, NY), May 28.
- 1967: "Competitive Art Exhibition at State Fair; Total of $2,350 in Prizes Will Be Awarded," The Kingston Daily Freeman (NY), May 29, p. 12.
- 1967: "Competitive Art Exhibit Due at Fair," Watertown Daily Times (NY), June 1.
- 1967: "Coup de poing dans Manhattan," L'Express #835, June, p. 9. About his concept of gateways for Manhattan.
- 1967: L'Architecture d'aujourd'hui, June–July, pp. 62–3. About a medical cooperative and two housing units in Toulouse.
- 1967: "Le concept de portes pour les centres urbains" (The Concept of Gateways in Urban Centers), L'Architecture d'aujourd'hui, June–July, p. 87. About gateways for New York City.
- 1967: Primera plana, No. 210 à 222 (Buenos Aires, Argentina), p. 66.
- 1967: "Modern Living: The Big Play in Paper, from Giraffes to Gazebos," Life, Nov. 3, pp. 84–5. Photograph of a sculpture p. 84.
- 1968: El diario, La Prensa de NY, Jan. (Spanish). Renovating a neighborhood in East Harlem. Projects by Katan.
- 1968: Il confronto, Mar.-Apr., pp. 38–41 (Italian). Katan's conception of future architectural education.
- 1968: Dorothy Kalins Wise, "Dialogue with a Neighborhood," New York Magazine, June 17, pp. 28–33.
- 1969: "Students, the AIA and Dissent: A Preview of Chicago '69?," Inland Architect, Jan., p. 28.
- 1969: El diario, La Prensa de NY, Mar., p. 18 (Spanish). About community action.
- 1969: "Jefferson Street Alternative to Be Discussed," Poughkeepsie Journal (NY), March 13, p. 38.
- 1970: Avant Garde Magazine, June, p. 34. An preview of Katan's From World Fairs to Fair Cities 1976 (New York, 1972), see above.
- 1970 : "Plan Innovative Housing Unit for Elderly in East Harlem," Sunday News (NY), Aug. 23, p. M12.
- 1970: Lotus, pp. 79–83 and 360-362 (Italian). A yearly journal about architecture and city planning. Various project for East Harlem, including the Brooklyn Bridge Gateway (see Brooklym Bridge Gateway, Nabal Press, 1969).
- 1971: "Planner, Architect to Lecture at AU," Wellsville Daily Reporter (NY), Feb. 18, p. 8.
- 1971: "The Harlem of their Dream," Manhattan East, Aug., pp. 1 and 8. About the East Harlem Summer Festival.
- 1971: L'Architecture d'aujourd'hui, Sep., pp. 82–5. An interview and 3 projects for East Harlem.
- 1971: L'Architecture d'aujourd'hui, Nov., pp. 32 and 37-8. Two projects for East Harlem.
- 1972: Dore Ashton, New York: Architecture, Sculpture, Painting (World Cultural Guides series), London: Thames and Hudson, pp. 202–3 et 206.
- 1973: "Operare dall'esterno... 'il planning with people'," Parametro, July, pp. 22–5.
- 1975: Michael Hitzig, "At Intermedia: 'Theater of Light'," Sunday Journal-News (NY), May 4, p. 1E.
- 1975: Michael Hitzig, "Light Fantastic," Sunday Journal-News (NY), Oct. 26, p. 1S et 6S.
- 1976: David Spengler, "The Ladies of Stone," The Record (Bergen County, NJ), Mar. 26, p. B15.
- 1980: Pierre Simonitsch, "Malis Aufbruch ins Industriezeitalter" (Mali Enters the Industrial Era), Tages Anzeiger (Zurich), Feb. 13, and Frankfurter Rundschau, Feb. 20.
- 1980: Pierre-Yves Péchoux, "Mutation d'un urbaniste: Roger Katan, De quoi se mêlent les urbanistes ?" [book review], Revue géographique des Pyrénées et du Sud-Ouest, Vol. 51, issue 1, Bordeaux, 1980, pp. 85–6.
- 1980: "Utilisation de matériaux traditionnels: La maison de Sélingué" (Using Traditional Materials: A House in Selingue), Habitat News, vol. 2, No. 2, United Nations Centre for Human Settlements, p. 34.
- 1981: Jean Dethier (ed.), Des architectures de terre, ou, L'avenir d'une tradition millénaire (exhibition cat., Oct. 28, 1981 - Feb. 1, 1982), Paris: Centre Georges Pompidou, Centre de création industrielle, p. 173-4.
- 1981: "Three questions for the Designer," Suomen Kuvahleti (Finlande), 14 août. An interview with 3 designers: K. Vajas (India), Yuri Solovjev (Soviet Institute of Design), and Katan (France/US).
- 1982: Afrique-Asie No. 256-270, p. 51-2.
- 1982: Richard Plunz, Habiter New York: la forme institutionnalisée de l'habitat new-yorkais, 1850-1950, Bruxelles: Pierre Mardaga Editeur, p. 230.
- 1983: L'Express, partie 1 (No. 1643-1654), pp. 82–3.
- 1983: Yves Montenay, Le Socialisme contre le Tiers-Monde, Paris: Albin Michel, p. 154.
- 1983: Dan Bernfeld, Un nouvel enjeu, la participation: aspects du mouvement participatif en Afrique, en Asie, aux États-Unis d'Amérique et en Europe, Paris: Unesco, p. 63-4.
- 1984: Alfred Mondjanagni, La Participation populaire au développement en Afrique noire / People's Participation in Development in Black Africa (bilingual), Paris: Editions Karthala, pp. 13 and 19.
- 1986: Kaisa Broner, New York face à son patrimoine, Bruxelles: Pierre Mardaga Editeur, p. 37.
- 1994: Serge Theunynck, Économie de l'habitat et de la construction au Sahel, vol. 2, Paris: L'Harmattan, p. 454-5.
- 1995: Robert A.M. Stern, Thomas Mellins & David Fishman, New York 1960: Architecture and Urbanism between the Second World War and the Bicentennial, New York: The Monacelli Press, pp. 86 6, 869, 876, and 889-891.
- 2001: Yvette Marin, Les Utopies de la ville (Les Cahiers du CREHU #10), Besançon: Presses universitaires franc-comtoises, p. 434.
- 2005: Jean-Louis Violeau, Les Architectes et mai 68, Paris: Éditions Recherches, p. 220 et 226.
- 2009: The Book of Genesis Illustrated by Robert Crumb, New York: W.W. Norton & Co., 2009, n.p. In his introduction, Robert Crumb refers to his friend Katan and his knowledge of traditional clothing and architecture in the Near-East.
- 2012: François Charcellay, "Roger Katan retrouve à Sauve le soleil de son Maroc natal," Midi libre, Aug. 18, p. 3.
- 2012: Laure Ducos, "De New York à Alès, Roger Katan reste allumé," Midi libre, 14 oct.
- 2014: Julia Wesely, "Building Together," Environment & Urbanization (London, UK).
- 2014: Edith Lefranc, "Exposition à Alès: découvrez les 23 talents de la Galerie 15," Midi Libre, Dec. 11
- 2015: Smitha Gopalakrishnan, "Book Review," The Cyberhood (Buffalo, NY), Jan.-Feb.
- 2015: Sam Hall Kaplan, "Affordable Housing: the Hype and the Hope," Planetizen (Los Angeles, CA), Feb. 17.
- 2015: Sam Roberts, "Building New York's Future and its Past," The New York Times, Feb. 22, p. MB3 (New York ed.).
- 2015: Roberta Brandes Gratz, "Real Collaboration" (Building Together review), The Architect's Newspaper, issue 3, Apr. 8, 2015.
- 2016: André Derudder, "Roger Katan et les Cynétiques exposés à Sauve," Midi Libre, June 8.
- 2016: André Derudder, "Sauve: TJ Owen et Roger Katan exposent à la galerie Vidourle Prix," Midi Libre, Dec.
- 2016: Manish Chalana & Jeffrey Hou (eds.), Messy Urbanism: Understanding the “Other” Cities of Asia, Hong Kong University Press, p. 6.

== Conferences ==
- 1964-74: Katan lectured extensively, invited by American universities and student associations to deliver conferences under the auspices of the United States Department of Housing and Urban Development and the National Park Service.
- Took part in a seminar organized by the New York State Department of Health.
- 1966: Seminar on behavioral science organized by the Carnegie Endowment for International Peace.
- 1967: Key speaker at the National Institute of Architectural Education (today's Van Alen Institute) seminar about "The Student and His Future development," New York Hilton, May 15. Katan spoke about the advantages of student exchange programs and community organizations.
- 1967-78: Conferences and seminars on advocacy planning in American universities, such as University of Michigan, UC Berkeley, Harvard, MIT, University of Pennsylvania, Yale, Princeton, University of Nebraska, University of North Dakota, Syracuse University, Carnegie Mellon University, Alfred University (New York), New School of Social Research (New York), Rensselaer Polytechnic Institute (New York), etc., and European universities, including Delft and Amsterdam universities in The Netherlands, Vincennes, Aix-en-Provence, Ecole nationale des Beaux-Arts in Paris, France, Grand Palais, etc.
- Since 1979: Katan occasionally delivers conference papers and lectures including:
- 1981: "International Design Conference," Finlandia Hall, Helsinki, Finland, Aug. Katan was one of 4 key speakers. The conference was attended by 1500 people.
- 1981: In Bogota, Colombia, Katan organized an international conference on shantytowns in developing countries.
- 1982: He supervised the organization of a Franco-Colombian conference on social housing in Bogota, May 11–14.
- 1992: "Case Studies from Developing Communities," with Michael Cohen. A conference organized by the Municipal Art Society of New York on July 21.

== Kinetic Art ==
From 1963 to 1975, Katan's works were shown in museums and galleries, including Finch College Museum of Art in New York, and various art festivals.

Wayne Anderson, the MIT Art historian and critic, wrote about his work:

"Roger Katan's recent studies in kinetic illumination expand his architectural interests into a form which projects itself upon its surroundings. . . . Following a logical sequence from fantasy to reality, his studies of repetitive, machine-made, ubiquitous objects, made into painted structures excited by active colored lights, strive to create phenomena of form and color that are commensurate with the spontaneous and intricate manner in which human senses react. The ultimate place of Mr. Katan's art is with architecture, particularly the architecture of night."

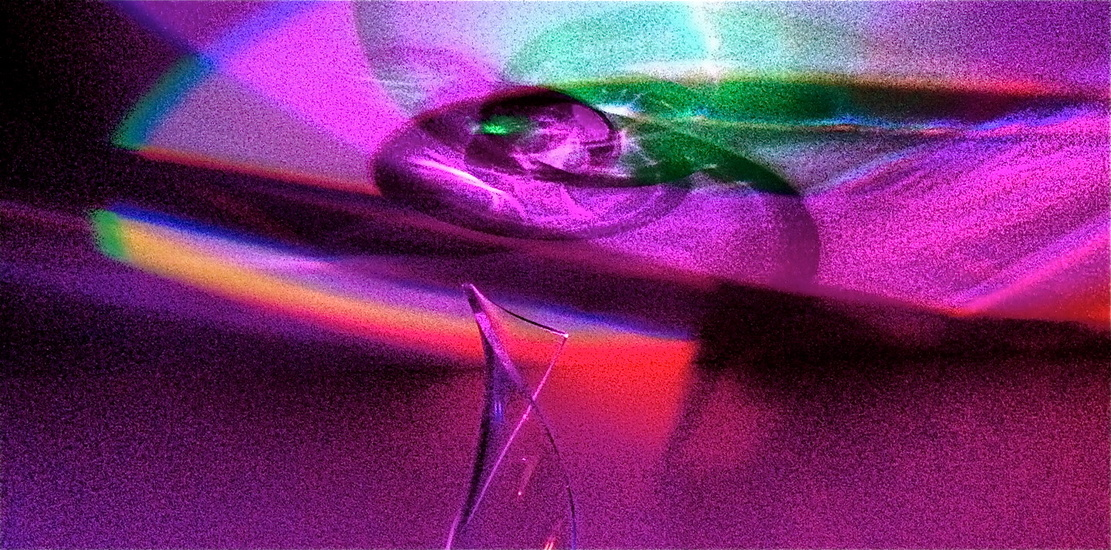
Katan, Kinetic Sculpture, mixed media, 2009-13

In Katan's most recent compositions, the shapes and colors of the solids intertwine, casting light and colors through matter. These works are inspired by the discovery of the elementary particles in the primordial fireball at time zero. The power of changing lights enhance and transform matter. Colors and shapes merge, then alternately combine and separate, and the viewer's optic nerve finishes the painting. At time zero, why are some bosons such as photons massless while others are massive? What caused this phenomenon to occur? At first, you enjoy a moment of peace and purity, the gentle breeze of colors and matter blowing through your mind. Then total chaos breaks out, fueled by luminous upheavals and apocalyptic visions, slowly rising and receding to finally let life emerge from the symbolic eggshells—and a new order arises. The changing colors of the LEDs shine through the translucent solids depending on the viewer's frame of mind—and creative remote control. Matter and light are the sacred essence of all creation, the founding elements of life and mankind. The brighter the signs, the deeper they echo within. Then our eyes are caught by the colors projected by LEDs through a spinning helicoid, inviting us to enter the ever-changing magnetic vortex of polar lights and their haunting mystery.

=== Selected exhibitions ===
- 1963: Osgood Gallery, New York. Collages and mecanographs.
- 1964: Print Club, Philadelphia, Pennsylvania. Mecanographs (large abstract blueprints).
- 1965: "Art '65," New York World's Fair, American Express Pavillon, Apr. 21 April–October 17. Kinetic constructions. A group show featuring 40 other sculptors such as Peter Hutchinson, Robert Ryman, Robert Smithson, etc.
- 1965: "The Visual Aesthetic of the Architect," solo exhibition, New School for Social Research, New York, June 1–30.
- 1966: Pratt Institute School of Architecture, Brooklyn, New York. Mecanographs and kinetic structures.
- 1966: "Light-Motion Environments," solo exhibition, The New School Associates, New York, May 2–July 31.
- 1967: "Lights in Orbit," Howard Wise Gallery (kinetic art gallery), New York, Feb. 4–Mar. 4. Renamed "Light/Motion/Space," the show traveled to the Walker Art Center, Minneapolis (Apr. 8–May 21), the Milwaukee Art Center (June 24–July 30), and the Waddell Gallery, New York (for race equality). See Howard Wise and Robert M. Murdoch (eds.), Light/Motion/Space (exhibition cat.), with an essay by Willoughby Sharp, Minneapolis, MN: Walkert Art Center, 1967, 36 pages.
- 1967: "Sculpture Architecture, Architecture Sculpture," The Visual Arts Gallery, 209 E 23rd St., Feb. 10 - Mar. 3. A group exhibition with Peter Agostini, Ronald Bladen, Ulrich Franzen, Charles Gwathmey, Philip Johnson, Louis I. Kahn, Robert Murray, George Rickey, Paul Rudolph, David von Schlegell, Robert Smithson, and Villamil-Matsuzuki.
- 1967: "The Visionaries," East Hampton Gallery, 22 W 56th St, New York, March 21–Apr. 8. A group exhibition of kinetic works.
- 1967: "Art Today," New York State Fair, Syracuse, NY, Aug. 29-Sep.4. A group show organized in cooperation with the New York State Council of the Arts. The 25 selected artists included Joseph Albers, Richard Anuszkiewicz, Ben Cunningham, Jim Dine, Eva Hesse, Red Grooms, Joseph Levy, Roy Lichtenstein, Marisol, Claes Oldenburg, Robert Rauschenberg, George Segal, Andy Warhol, and Tom Wesselman.
- 1973: Syracuse Museum, New York. A group exhibition of kinetic works.
- 1974: Howard Wise Kinetic Arts Gallery, New York. 8 invited artists including Alexander Calder, Jean Tinguely, Len Lye, Louis Nevelson, and Gerald Auster, each showing one work. Katan showed Roselights for Whiteville, used for the cover of Progressive Architecture, July 1968.
- 1975: "Architectures and Sculpture," School of Visual Arts, New York. A solo exhibition of kinetic works and architectural projects.
- Since 1999: Katan regularly exhibits his kinetic works in France.
- 2012: "Robert Crumb, Sophie & Aline Crumb, Jacques Massé, Roger Katan and Permanent Artists," Galerie VP (formerly Galerie Vidourle Prix), May 1 - Sep. 29.
- 2014: "L’art de la lumière et des formes," group exhibition, Galerie 15, Alès (Gard), Dec. 2014 - Jan. 2015.
- 2015 : Space Sphere (Kinetic Planet Alpha), a permanent sculpture located on a pond at the foot of the high walls of Sauve (Jan.–Feb.).
- 2016: Roger Katan & TJ Owens.Galerie VP, Dec. 1, 2016 - Feb. 18, 2017.
