= Arthur Schiff =

American direct marketeer (1940–2006)

Arthur Schiff (1 May 1940 – 24 August 2006) was one of the least known but most influential promoters of American kitsch products.

Schiff ran his own company and ingenious marketing campaigns for 23 years. During his long career in advertising, he produced over 1800 direct response TV infomercials, including the Steakhouse Onion Machine, Ambervision Sunglasses and the Shiwala car mop. One of the most famous products worked on by Schiff is the line of Ginsu knives, during his three-year term of employment as Creative Director at legendary direct marketing firm Dial Media, founded By Ed Valenti and Barry Becher in 1975, in Warwick, Rhode Island.

Schiff's commercials gained a degree of notoriety for their effective use of catchphrases, including his signature creation "But wait, there's more!" He also coined several other widely used and often parodied phrases used in infomercials today, including "Isn't that amazing?" "Isn't that a Clever Cleaver!" and "Act now and you'll also receive ... "

The history of the Ginsu product line can be traced back to 1978, when Schiff's employer Edward Valenti was looking for the best way to market a line of "ordinary" kitchen knives with the rather dull brand name "Quikut". Working as part of a creative team that included Valenti and Becher, Schiff rebranded this product as Ginsu. Schiff recalled some years later, "I went to sleep that night, still wrestling with the problem," he wrote, in typically fervid style. "And then it happened! I bolted out of bed at three o'clock in the morning and yelled, 'Eureka! I've got it. Ginsu!' I wrote the bizarre word down on a piece of paper and went back to sleep. When I got up again four hours later, the paper was still there and that strange word was still on it. I stuffed it into my shirt pocket and headed off to work."

The combination of Schiff's unusual Japanese sounding name for the knives with product demonstrations and copy lines previously developed by Valenti and Becher, many of which had been used to sell their first three multi-million selling products (Miracle Painter, Miracle Duster and Miracle Slicer) on TV prior to Schiff's employment, seemed to launch Ginsu to an even higher level of success and consumer retention.

Much like the ice cream brand Häagen-Dazs, the Ginsu name was nonsense, but nevertheless extremely effective in associating the product image as a "samurai sword" for the kitchen. The partners (Valenti and Becher) hired a local Japanese exchange student to appear as a chef. The most famous Ginsu television advertisement began with a hand karate-chopping a two-by-four board. According to the opening copy co-written by Valenti and Schiff, "In Japan, the hand can be used like a knife. But this method doesn't work with a tomato" (cut to Valenti's hand karate chopping...and squashing...a tomato).

Schiff died of lung cancer in Coral Springs, Florida in 2006.

== See also ==
- Ron Popeil
- Pearl Schiff
