= Shiff =

Shiff is a surname. Notable people with the surname include:

- Buki Shiff, Israeli opera and theatre costume designer
- Jonathan M. Shiff, Australian television producer
- Meir Shiff (1608–1644), German rabbi and Talmud scholar

== See also ==
- Shif
- Schiff
