= Grupo Imagem =

Grupo Imagem was a Brazilian infomercial company. Its director was David Gurevish
and its communications manager was Iri Catureba.

It became famous for being the pioneer in the direct response model, which was heavily used in the 1990s. Extensive exposure on networks such as Band and Manchete made its infomercials true Brazilian television classics.

The company was specialized in importing infomercial products into Brazil. Likewise, the infomercials came from abroad, and were dubbed into Brazilian Portuguese. Products such as Ginsu knives, Vivarina tights, Contour Pillow and Ambervision sunglasses became famous thanks to their television airings. Its phone number, 1406, telemarketing number of the Brazilian postal company (Correios), also became a pop culture symbol, used by the public to call and ask for its products.

== History ==
The company appeared for the first time in 1991, during a commercial break on Jô Soares Onze e Meia, on SBT. At the time, it got a two-minute slot to sell Multicabide.

In 1994, it got a 90-minute overnight slot on Rede Bandeirantes. Grupo Imagem did not reveal how much money it earned, but in 1995, it received 1,700 to 2,100 calls per day. That year, the company had 40 sales points in São Paulo, with a team of 140, com uma equipe de 140 customer service attendants which took turns daily.

The company's method was selling products that worked efficiently. Ginsu knives cut several types of products and had a 52-year warranty. Vivarina tights were always shown as a product that never shredded. Another sales tactic was showing that the consumer could want its money back in case the consumer repented buying in up to seven days. It also sold a collection of cassette tapes containing Paulo Coelho's entire books.

In 1995, a commentator told Jornal do Brasil that Ginsu knives are "a cock-and-bull story" and could not cut a coconut.

The company remained active until the early 2000, when its focus shifted to slimming products, such as Celebrity Juice Fast and Fybersan Plus tabs. From 2001 to 2003, the company was targeted by 99 lawsuits at São Paulo's Procon.

Grupo Imagem was last known to be active in 2004, when it leased airtime on CNT. Even then, the company faced consumer complaints because of the delay in sending the products.

== In popular culture ==
- Mamonas Assassinas released a song named 1406 (in reference to the phone number used by Grupo Imagem), citing some of its products, such as Ambervision and Ginsu.
- Another characteristic, that its products led to the end of the problems of the potential consumer, was parodied in Casseta & Planeta, Urgente!, on Rede Globo, with the fictional company Organizações Tabajara.
- In the opening to Globo's 2019 telenovela Verão 90, there are references to Ginsu and Ambervision.
