= PriMedia Inc =

U.S. media buying and marketing firm

- Industry: Media buying
- Predecessor: Dial Media
- Founders: Ed Valenti; Barry Becher
- Headquarters: Rhode Island, U.S.
- Area served: Worldwide
- Key people: James J. Cooney
- Website: www.primediahq.com

PriMedia Inc is a media buying and marketing firm based in Rhode Island, U.S. The company was founded by Ed Valenti and Barry Becher, and helped pioneer infomercials, the use of credit cards and 800 numbers on Television ads, and the 30-minute infomercial format on shopping channels.

== History ==
PriMedia (then named Dial Media) was founded in 1975 by Ed Valenti and Barry Becher. PriMedia became the first major infomercial company and launched several mainstream products including the Ginsu knives. The company also developed the “long-form” infomercial formats, which later developed into standard half-hour infomercial formats used in Home shopping channels including QVC and HSN. Primedia was one of the first to use toll-free telephone numbers in television ads to allow use of credit cards to order products in real-time.

James J. Cooney, who was a teenager when he first met the firm's co-founders, later joined the firm. (Note: Cooney didn't co-found the company. He met Valenti and Becher after they founded the company in 1975, when he was 16 or 17.)
