= Fanatics, Inc. =

American online sports retailer

- Type: Private
- Industry: Entertainment; E-commerce; Textile
- Founded: 2011; 15 years ago
- Founder: Michael Rubin
- Headquarters: New York City, U.S.
- Area served: Worldwide
- Key people: Michael Rubin (CEO); Glenn H. Schiffman (EVP & CFO)
- Products: Licensed sports apparel; Sports equipment; Trading cards; Sportsbooks
- Number of employees: 22,000
- Divisions: List: Fanatics Commerce; Fanatics Collectibles; Fanatics Betting & Gaming; Fanatics Events; Fanatics Markets; Fanatics Studios
- Subsidiaries: Hat World, Inc. (2018–present); Mitchell & Ness (2022–present); Topps (2021–present)
- Website: fanaticsinc.com

Fanatics, Inc. is an American sports platform that consists of several businesses, including licensed sports merchandise, trading cards and collectibles, sports betting, special events, and live commerce. The company was founded in Jacksonville, Florida, by Michael Rubin in 2011 as an online retailer of licensed sportswear and merchandise for major collegiate and professional sports leagues and teams.

Since 2024, Fanatics is the exclusive ice hockey jersey supplier for all teams in the NHL. The company also produces uniforms for football and basketball teams in Japan. After a licensing deal signed with FIFA, Fanatics will become the exclusive licensor of collectible cards, stickers, and card games for the World Cup and other FIFA events. The agreement will go into effect in 2031, replacing Panini after more than five decades.

== History ==
Football Fanatics, which later became Fanatics, Inc., was founded by brothers Alan and Mitchell Trager in Jacksonville, Florida. They initially started with a brick-and-mortar store in Orange Park Mall in 1995, focusing on local team merchandise, particularly Jacksonville Jaguars apparel. The company later expanded into e-commerce and was eventually acquired by Michael Rubin's GSI Commerce, which later became Fanatics, Inc. In 1998, Rubin created an apparel and logistics company, Global Sports Incorporated, which would later turn into GSI Commerce, a multibillion-dollar e-commerce company. Rubin sold GSI to eBay in 2011 for $2.4 billion and bought back the sports e-commerce business, which included online stores for all North American sports leagues along with hundreds of teams and colleges, keeping the name Fanatics, Inc. for the new company moving forward.

=== Expansion ===
In April 2012, Fanatics raised $150 million from Insight Venture Partners and Andreessen Horowitz and acquired its Florida-based rival Dreams, Inc. for $158 million in cash and $25 million in debt. This move added the brands FansEdge and Mounted Memories, which were rebranded as the Fanatics Authentic division.

Rubin's vision was to differentiate Fanatics by serving the real-time expectations of global sports fans and partners. In 2014, Doug Mack was appointed CEO and Fanatics opened a Bay Area office to tap into the Silicon Valley tech talent pool. Mack helped Fanatics move from a domestic e-commerce business to a mobile-first, direct-to-consumer brand with its own manufacturing capabilities. Priorities such as real-time manufacturing, data, and technology would guide the company's vertical commerce (v-commerce) model.

In 2015, Fanatics raised $300 million from Silver Lake Partners. In early 2016, the company acquired UK-based internet retailer Kitbag to accelerate focus on international expansion and global soccer. In April 2017, Fanatics bought sportswear and merchandise manufacturer and MLB uniform provider Majestic Athletic from VF Corporation in an effort to add to the company's growing vertical manufacturing capabilities. Nike Inc. would eventually take over as MLB's official on-field uniform partner, with Fanatics using the existing facilities acquired during the Majestic acquisition to make Nike MLB uniforms.

In September 2017, Fanatics closed a $1 billion round of fundraising led by Softbank, with participation from the NFL, MLB, NHL, MLS and NFLPA. Fanatics was expected to produce $2.2 billion in annual revenue that year. The next month, Fanatics acquired Fermata Partners to transform the college licensed sports business and a new Fanatics College division was formed. In the following two years, Fanatics announced 10-year deals with Nike, the National Football League and Major League Baseball that granted Fanatics the rights to design, manufacture and distribute all Nike fan gear sold at retail for both leagues.

At the onset of the pandemic in early 2020, Fanatics and MLB halted production of MLB jerseys to manufacture masks and gowns for emergency personnel battling COVID-19. Using the exact same material that was previously used to make Yankees, Red Sox, Phillies and all other MLB jerseys, that fabric was instead used to make more than one million masks and gowns that were eventually shipped to more than a dozen states.

In April 2020, Michael Rubin—with the help of Fanatics employees around the world—launched the ALL IN Challenge, one of the largest digital fundraisers in history. The celebrity and athlete driven ALL IN Challenge raised $60 million to provide nearly 300 million meals for Feeding America, Meals on Wheels, No Kid Hungry, and World Central Kitchen. Also in 2020, Fanatics established the All-In Challenge Foundation, which would continue to be the philanthropic arm of the company.

In August 2020, the company secured $350 million Series E funding raising Fanatics' valuation to $6.2 billion. Using the new funds, Fanatics purchased assets from Vetta Brands, including leading collegiate headwear producer Top of the World. This acquisition saved more than 200 jobs and added significant headwear scale and capabilities. In December 2020, Fanatics acquired WinCraft, a licensed hard goods and promotional products company, which increased the company's presence with non-apparel merchandise.

=== Global sports platform (2021–present) ===
In March 2021, Fanatics secured a $320 million funding round, followed by another $325 million in August 2021 that brought the company's valuation to $18 billion as of September 2021. During the latter round, the company announced plans to expand into new business verticals, described by sources as a "global digital sports platform." Reported potential areas of expansion included NFTs, trading cards, sports betting and gaming, ticketing, and media. Following these developments, Michael Rubin assumed the role of CEO of the broader Fanatics portfolio.

In May 2021, Rubin co-founded the digital collectibles company Candy Digital with Mike Novogratz and Gary Vaynerchuk. Candy Digital secured an exclusive, long-term agreement with MLB as its first content partner. Later that year, Candy Digital secured a $100 million financing round, valuing the company at $1.5 billion. The round included Insight Partners, SoftBank Vision Fund2, NFL Hall of Famer Peyton Manning, Connect Ventures and Will Ventures. In January 2022, Fanatics divested its 60% stake in Candy Digital.

In August 2021, Fanatics secured long-term trading cards manufacturing and distribution rights from MLB, MLBPA, NBA, NBPA, and NFLPA. A month later, Fanatics Collectibles, the company's trading cards and collectibles division, raised $350 million in a Series A round, giving the company a $10.4 billion valuation. In December 2021, Fanatics acquired Topps, a licensed trading card company founded in 1938. As part of the acquisition, approximately 350 Topps employees joined Fanatics Collectibles.

In February 2022, Fanatics acquired lifestyle and streetwear brand Mitchell & Ness from Juggernaut Capital Partners. Mitchell & Ness operates as a separate brand within the Fanatics Commerce division. In April 2022, Fanatics announced a $1.5 billion fundraising round, followed by another $700 million in December 2022, which was reported to value the company at $31 billion. During the December round, Rubin announced plans to launch a third vertical, Fanatics Betting & Gaming, in 2023.

In May 2023, Fanatics bid to acquire PointsBet's U.S. business for $150 million, representing Fanatics' first entry into the U.S. sports betting market. Fanatics made international acquisitions for its Commerce division, including Italian sports merchandise company Epi in April 2023, and Latin American sports wholesaler Fex Pro in June 2023. Also in June 2023, Fanatics increased its offer to $225 million following a competing $195 million bid from DraftKings. The first wave of the deal closed in August 2023 in eight U.S. states and started the brand transition from PointsBet to Fanatics Sportsbook. In October 2023, Fanatics sold Bazooka Candy Brands and its product portfolio, which was part of Topps, to Apax Partners.

In 2023, Panini filed a lawsuit against Fanatics, alleging anti-competitive behavior. In September 2024, U.S. District Judge Andrew Carter Jr. dismissed a lawsuit that Casey’s Distributing brought against Fanatics and the MLB regarding the two organizations' relationship. Later in July 2025, it was announced that the same judge dismissed the federal lawsuit brought by Casey’s against Fanatics and the NFL that insisted a league policy requiring approval to sell NFL-licensed products online violates the Sherman Act.

Fanatics received backlash over the quality of its MLB jerseys in 2024. Following player complaints, MLB and Nike announced adjustments to the uniforms, including enlarged lettering and full pant customization starting in the 2025 season. The MLB Players Association memo emphasized that the issues were related to Nike's design rather than Fanatics' manufacturing, stating, "This has been entirely a Nike issue," per the memo. "At its core, what has happened here is that Nike was innovating something that didn't need to be innovated."

In August 2025, Fanatics ONE, the company's first loyalty program, was launched, offering rewards and experiences to fans across the company's divisions in fan apparel, trading cards and collectibles, online sports betting and casino rewards, and access to events.

Also in August 2025, Fanatics Advertising, the company’s advertising division, was launched. Jeremi Gorman was appointed as the chief revenue officer of the division. The division oversees brand partnerships across Fanatics’ business units. It also introduced the Fanatics Advertising Network (FAN) and Sports Video Network (SVN), which provide digital-video and connected-TV advertising alongside sports content. In December 2025, Fanatics announced the launch of Fanatics Markets, its prediction market, in 24 states.

In January 2026, Fanatics announced the launch of Fanatics Studios, its entertainment and content-production division in partnership with OBB Media.

== Divisions and brands ==
=== Fanatics Commerce ===
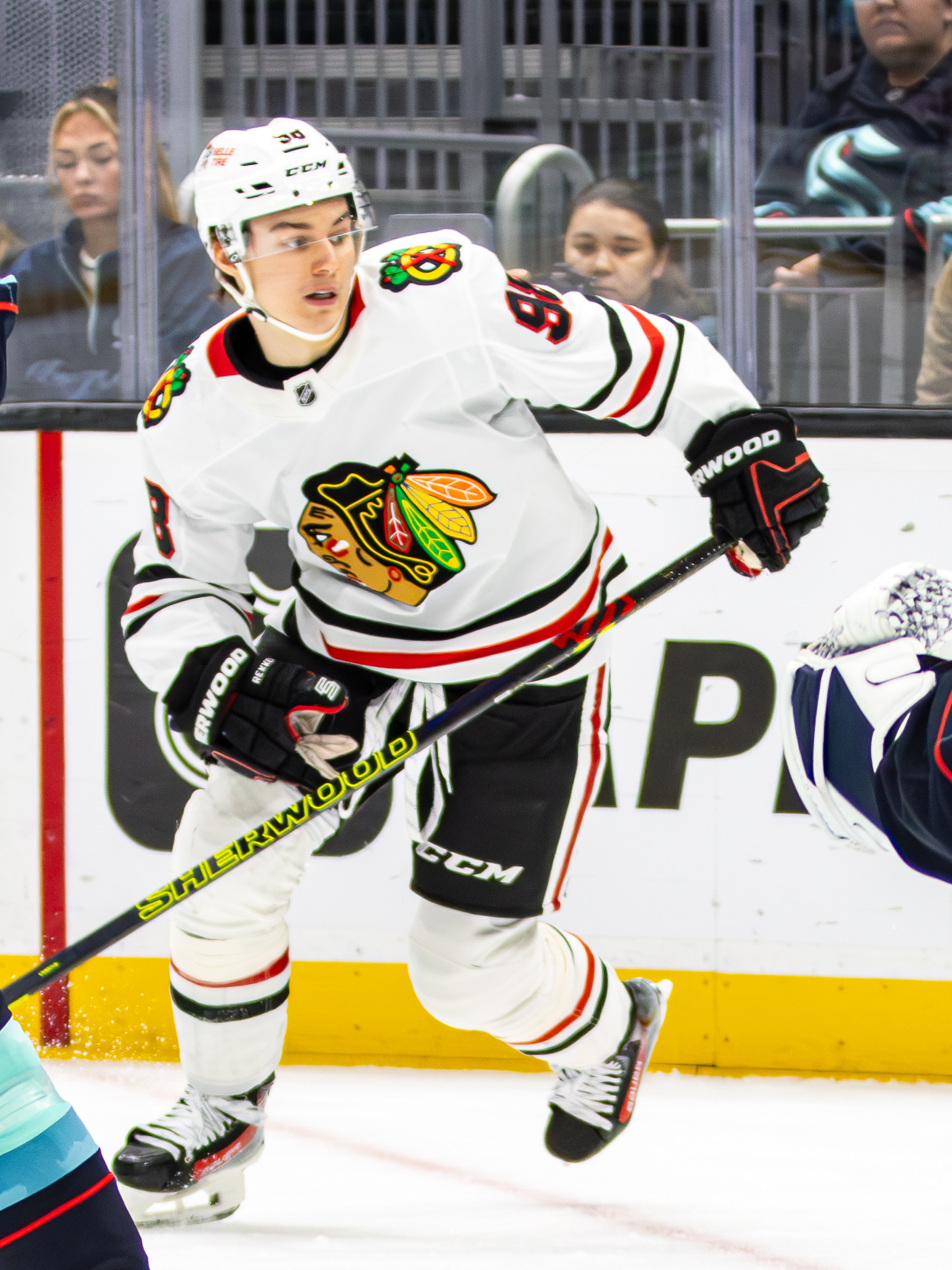
Chicago Blackhawks jersey by Fanatics. The company is the NHL jersey supplier since 2024

The Fanatics Commerce division, led by CEO Andrew Low Ah Kee, who joined Fanatics in September 2023, designs and manufactures licensed fan apparel, jerseys, headwear, and related merchandise. In addition to its website, the company operates more than 80 offices, manufacturing facilities, and fulfillment centers worldwide, including international distribution centers across Europe, Asia, and Australia. As of January 2024, Fanatics Commerce sells 1.5 million sports-related SKUs across more than 1,000 brands.

The division has agreements with major professional leagues such as the NFL, NBA, MLB, NHL, MLS, Formula One, and the Australian Football League, as well as numerous collegiate programs. Its partnerships include licensing and manufacturing arrangements for Nike-branded MLB and NFL fan gear, a collaboration with Barnes & Noble Education (BNED) and Lids to provide merchandise for 755 college bookstores, and long-term agreements with organizations such as Paris Saint-Germain FC, the Dallas Cowboys, and the International Olympic Committee.

In 2023, Fanatics signed a deal to be the exclusive jersey supplier for the National Hockey League (NHL), replacing Adidas. The 10-year agreement started in the 2024–25 season. Fanatics had previously worked with the NHL, making replica jerseys for fans after a deal signed in 2017.

Also in 2023 the company also signed agreements with J-League football teams to be their exclusive kit uniform supplier. Japanese deals included not only football but basketball teams.

=== Fanatics Collectibles ===
Fanatics Collectibles was launched in 2021, following reports that the company obtained exclusive licensing agreements to produce trading cards for several sports properties, including MLB, MLBPA, NBA, NBPA, and NFLPA. The division is led by CEO Mike Mahan, who joined the company in June 2022. In May 2023, Fanatics acquired PWCC Marketplace, an auction house focused on sports collectibles. The following year, in July 2024, PWCC Marketplace was rebranded to Fanatics Collect.

It was announced in October 2025 that Fanatics, through its subsidiary Topps, obtained the NBA trading card license, marking the return of officially licensed packs of Topps NBA cards since the 2009-2010 season.

In April 2026, it was announced that Fanatics would begin producing fully licensed NFL cards for the first time since 2016. The company also debuted its patch program for the first time, which takes patches from players' jerseys that were worn in their first regular-season game and inserts them into one-of-one-numbered, autographed card.

In May 2026, it was revealed that Fanatics had signed an exclusive collective licensing deal with FIFA to become the exclusive licensor of collectible cards, stickers, and card games for the World Cup and other FIFA events. All collectibles will be produced under the Topps brand, owned by Fanatics. The agreement will be effective from 2031 onward. The deal cut the long-term partnership between FIFA and Panini, which had been the licensee for over five decades.

Fanatics Live

In July 2023, Fanatics launched Fanatics Live, a live-commerce platform offering trading-card breaks, merchandise releases, and creator-hosted content. The live shopping app, led by CEO Nick Bell, who joined the division in February 2023, allows users to participate in real-time shopping events.

In April 2025, Fanatics Collectibles launched Fanatics Live in the UK following its success in the U.S.

=== Fanatics Betting & Gaming ===
Fanatics Betting & Gaming is the sportsbook and online casino division of Fanatics, and is led by CEO Matt King, formerly of FanDuel. Fanatics launched its first retail sportsbook in January 2023 in Northwest Stadium (formerly FedEx Field), establishing the NFL’s first sportsbook inside a stadium.

Following its 2024 acquisition of PointsBet, Fanatics announced that its Fanatics Sportsbook would be available to approximately 95% of the addressable online sports bettor market in the U.S.

The division launched a standalone online casino service, Fanatics Casino, in May 2025.

In December 2025, Fanatics Betting & Gaming partnered with OpenBet, a betting technology provider, to implement geolocation, fraud prevention, anti-money laundering (AML), and responsible gaming tools on its sportsbook platform.

=== Fanatics Markets ===
Fanatics Markets, a prediction-market platform developed in partnership with Crypto.com, was launched in December 2025 and made available in 24 states. The platform allows users to trade on the outcome of real-world events, including sports results, political decisions, economics indicators, and cultural events.

=== Fanatics Events ===
Fanatics Events organizes Fanatics Fest, a sports and collectables fan convention first held at the Javits Center in New York City in 2024. The inaugural Fanatics Events was organized in partnership with IMG as part of WrestleMania XL and included programming with athletes, entertainers, and internet creators. Fanatics Events co-hosts WWE World, an interactive fan experience, which was most recently held at the Las Vegas Convention Center as part of WrestleMania 41 in April 2025.

Fanatics Fest 2025, held in June, had an estimated 125,000 attendees. The event featured the inaugural Fanatics Games, a series of competitions in which professional athletes and celebrities competed against fans for prizes and charitable donations. In November 2025, Fanatics announced a 10-year partnership with OBB Media as the producer and content partner of Fanatics Fest.

=== Fanatics Studios ===
In January 2026, Fanatics launched Fanatics Studios, an entertainment and content-production division focused on producing sports-related films, documentaries, and digital media projects in partnership with major broadcasters and sports organizations. Fanatics Studios was established as a joint venture with OBB Media, and its founder and CEO, Michael Ratner, is the CEO of the division.

In February 2026, Fanatics aired its first Super Bowl ad during halftime of Super Bowl LX. The ad was the first production from Fanatics Studios.
