= Nick Bell (businessman) =

British businessman

- Born: 17 December 1983 (age 42); Alnwick, Northumberland, England
- Occupation: Businessman
- Employer(s): Fanatics, Inc. Google (former); Snap Inc. (former); News Corp (former)
- Title: CEO - Fanatics Live
- Spouse: Sara Bell
- Website: www.nickbell.com

Nick Bell (born 17 December 1983) is the CEO of Fanatics Live, a business division of Fanatics, Inc., which specializes in live content-based commerce. He is tasked with enhancing the digital customer shopping experience, developing commerce capabilities centered on content and personalities, and expanding Fanatics' range of innovative technology products.

Prior to Fanatics, Bell led the product teams responsible for the Google Search experience. Before Google, he served as VP, Global Head of Content and Partnerships for Snap Inc. and SVP of Digital for News Corp.

== Early life and education ==
Bell was born in Alnwick, Northumberland, England and attended the Royal Grammar School in Newcastle.

== Career ==
In August 2019 Bell was part of the founding team of Attention Capital, a media and technology holding company. Prior to Attention Capital Bell spent 5 years at Snapchat joining from News Corp in early 2014 and was described as one of Spiegel's closest lieutenants. Bell was in charge of leading the company's content strategy, including the introduction of the Live Stories and Discover features to the Snapchat app.

In November 2018, Bell announced in a company-wide email that he was leaving Snap. In March 2019, he joined business incubator startup Human Ventures as a co-managing director of its "attention economy" portfolio.

In 2020, Bell joined Google where he led product teams for Google Images and later the Google Search experience.

In January 2023, Bell was appointed CEO of Fanatics Live, a new business division of Fanatics, Inc. focused on live content-based commerce. His role expanded to CEO of Fanatics Collect, overseeing the company's collectibles marketplace and live commerce operations. In July 2024, Fanatics launched Fanatics Collect, a collectibles marketplace connecting buyers and sellers of trading cards and memorabilia through fixed-price listings and auctions.

In August 2023, Bell was appointed to the board of directors of National CineMedia (NASDAQ: NCMI) following the company's emergence from Chapter 11.

== Honours and awards ==
- In 2016 Bell was named by the magazine Fast Company as 21st on its list of the "100 of the most creative business people" in 2016
- In 2016 he was listed on LinkedIn's Next Wave - Top Professionals 35 and Under Changing the Way We Do Business
- In 2016 he was featured in the Variety's Digital Entertainment Execs to Watch 2016 report
- In 2016 he was awarded first place in The Hollywood Reporter's ranking of L.A.'s Most Powerful Digital Players
- In 2017 he was listed at position 77 in the Billboard Power 100 List in 2017.
