= Broughton, Hampshire =

Village and parish in Hampshire, England

Coordinates: 51.0928°N 1.5639°W

Broughton
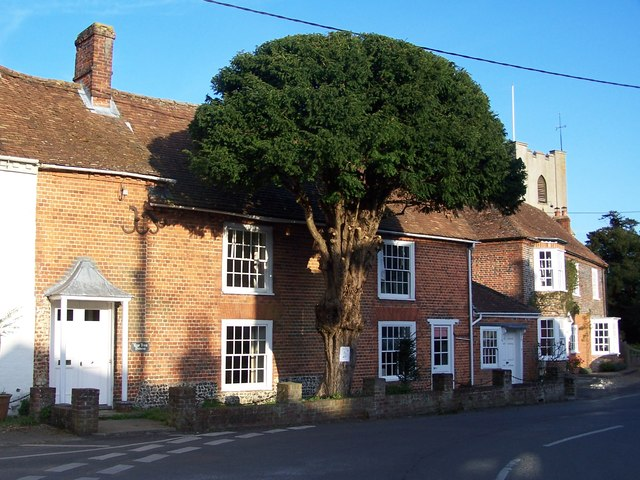
- Village centre, Broughton

- Location within Hampshire
- Population: 1,003 (2011 Census including Chattis Hill)
- Civil parish: Broughton
- District: Test Valley
- Shire county: Hampshire
- Region: South East
- Country: England
- Sovereign state: United Kingdom
- Post town: STOCKBRIDGE
- Postcode district: SO20
- Dialling code: 01794
- Police: Hampshire and Isle of Wight
- Fire: Hampshire and Isle of Wight
- Ambulance: South Central
- UK Parliament: North West Hampshire
- Website: Broughton village

Broughton is a village and civil parish in the Test Valley district of Hampshire, England, about 10 miles (16 km) north of Romsey. There are about 450 dwellings, and just under 1000 people, with domestic architecture spanning 600 years. The 2001 census recorded a parish population of 1,029, reducing to 1,003 at the 2011 Census.

== History ==
The Manor of Broughton is recorded in the Domesday Book and was held at different times by the Earl of Southampton, and the Duke of Kingston-upon-Hull. The current manor house is a Grade II* listed building, dating from the 18th century.

The Church of England parish church of St Mary the Virgin dates from the 12th century. The dovecote in the churchyard was built in 1684 on the site of a previous dovecote dating from 1340. The 19th-century Baptist chapel has been closed for worship and sold for development.

In 1990, Broughton was twinned with the picturesque medieval village of Sauve, near Nîmes, in the south of France.

== Culture and community ==
The village has a school, a doctor's surgery, a pub, a village shop, a cafe and a post office. Broughton Community Shop is a community-run and -funded business that opened in August 2018, after the long-standing village store and post office closed due to the retirement of its owners.

The village hall is at the centre of the village. In 2019, the hall was completely refurbished to include the community shop, cafe and post office. The hall also homes the Broughton Community Archive which is a huge collection of photographs and documents that was created over a period of 65 years by a village doctor, Dr Robert Parr. This collection was donated to the village, together with the space to store it in the village hall.

As of 2005, the village had an annual May fête, a flower show and a Christmas market.

== Education ==
=== State ===
Primary:

- Broughton Primary School

== Sport ==
Broughton Football Club were founded in 1901 and are affiliated to the Hampshire Football Association, running two adult teams and six boys teams. The Men's first team are long standing members of the Hampshire Premier League.

Broughton Cricket Club can trace their origins to 1865 and are members of the Hampshire League.

Both clubs are based at Buckholt Road Sports Field, which in 2025 saw a new multipurpose clubhouse opened.

== Twin towns ==
Broughton is twinned with:

- Sauve, France
