= Mitchell & Ness =

American sports equipment company

Mitchell & Ness Nostalgia Co.
- Type: Subsidiary
- Industry: Textile
- Founded: 1904; 122 years ago
- Founder: Frank P. Mitchell; Charles M. Ness
- Headquarters: Philadelphia, PA, U.S.
- Key people: Eli Kumekpor (CEO); Glen Giovanucci VP
- Products: Sportswear, apparel
- Brands: M&N
- Parent: Fanatics, Inc. (2022–present)
- Website: mitchellandness.com

Mitchell & Ness Nostalgia Co. is an American sports-related clothing company located in Philadelphia, Pennsylvania. The company was established in 1904 as a sports equipment manufacturer, remaining as the oldest sporting company in Philadelphia. After several years of making baseball and American football uniforms, the company switched direction in 1983, when it decided to recreate vintage jerseys.

Nowadays, Mitchell & Ness has license agreements with the major professional sports leagues of the United States (MLB, NBA, NFL, NHL, MLS, and WNBA plus collegiate NCAA) to produce and commercialise vintage sports equipment and casual wear.

Some of Mitchell & Ness products include team uniforms (jerseys and shorts) and other casual wear such as t-shirts, tracksuits, jackets, hoodies, hats, knit caps, and other accessories (pennants). The company also has its own brand, "M&N".

In February 2022, Mitchell & Ness was acquired by Fanatics, Inc., along with a group of investors including LeBron James, Jay-Z, and Kevin Hart.

== History ==
Frank P. Mitchell, a former Amateur Athletic Union tennis and wrestling champion, and Charles M. Ness, an avid golfer born in Scotland, together founded "Mitchell & Ness Sporting Goods" in 1904. Their original store made and strung hand-crafted tennis rackets and, using imported woods from Scotland, stolen from England, constructed custom-made golf clubs. In time, they expanded their business, selling uniforms to local baseball and American football teams. When the Philadelphia Eagles entered the young National Football League (NFL) in 1933, Mitchell & Ness supplied the team jerseys and equipment. Mitchell & Ness would continue to outfit the Eagles through the 1963 season.

The first time that the Mitchell & Ness label appeared on a major league baseball uniform, the Philadelphia Athletics, was in 1938. In the early 1940s, Mitchell & Ness began to supply Philadelphia's other major league baseball team, the Phillies. By the end of the decade, the Mitchell & Ness label was appearing on high school and college team uniforms throughout the Philadelphia area.

In the late 1970s, Mitchell & Ness had dropped the team business to concentrate on its retail operation. The store became a leading outlet for field hockey equipment and ski gear. Mitchell & Ness almost went bankrupt in 1983. Owner Peter Capolino told the Detroit Free Press, "By 1983 all the expansion I had done had gone to hell. I fired 100 people, closed two warehouses. I reduced the company to a little store at 13th and Walnut Streets (in Philadelphia). It was down to just me and my wife."

In 1983, a customer walked into the store and asked if Mitchell & Ness could repair his 1960 Pittsburgh Pirates game-worn vest, and his 1949 St. Louis Browns game-worn shirt. They were both made of wool flannel as all baseball uniforms had been during that era. Mitchell & Ness found that it could do it, and with the realization that Mitchell & Ness was capable of this task, an idea was born: Reproduce historically accurate wool-flannel baseball uniforms. Mitchell & Ness recruited history buffs and sports gurus most notably Capolino's friend Bob Downes. They dug through old newspapers, periodicals, books, programs, and old film footage. They consulted vintage uniform collectors throughout the country and visited the archives at the Baseball Hall of Fame in Cooperstown, New York.

Major League Baseball (MLB) teams had stopped wearing wool flannel jerseys by 1972 to wear double-knit polyester jerseys. In a dusty warehouse in North Philadelphia, Mitchell & Ness discovered rolls of old baseball flannel from 50 years earlier. They were still carefully wrapped, untouched, and in like-new condition ready to be cut and sewn. The flannel was sewn. The lettering and patches were recreated and applied. The jerseys were completed, and they were offered for sale. The first shirts sold almost overnight. So did the second batch of a dozen or more. In time, Mitchell & Ness attracted customers from across the United States. Sports Illustrated wrote a flattering piece about Mitchell & Ness in June 1987. The New York Times wrote about the company two years later.

In 1999, Mitchell & Ness expanded into the history of the National Basketball Association (NBA), when it introduced its Hardwood Classics collection of basketball jerseys. Football followed a year later with the Mitchell & Ness Throwback Collection. In 2002, the National Hockey League (NHL) granted Mitchell & Ness rights to remake vintage hockey sweaters.

Mitchell & Ness now has on file every MLB uniform worn since the founding of the original Cincinnati Red Stockings in 1869.

In 2007, Adidas purchased Mitchell & Ness in order to get into the retro-apparel style market. On May 29, 2008, the Philadelphia Phillies announced that they had signed Mitchell & Ness as a naming-rights partner of its clothes store at the Phillies' Citizens Bank Park. The Mitchell & Ness Alley Store is in Ashburn Alley beyond left-center field.

On January 24, 2011, the Reading Phillies, AA affiliate of the Phillies announced that they had signed Mitchell & Ness as a naming-rights partner of its apparel store at the R-Phils' FirstEnergy Stadium. On March 23, 2012, Jonathan Yuska was brought on as Head of Mitchell and Ness. In May 2016, Adidas sold Mitchell & Ness to "Juggernaut Capital Partners", a Washington, D.C.–based private equity firm.

== International expansion ==
Mitchell & Ness, expanded internationally launching in the United Kingdom and Australia in 2012. In April 2015, Mitchell & Ness grew its international sporting codes portfolio from NBA, NHL and NFL, to also include New Zealand and Australia’s National Basketball League (NBL). Mitchell & Ness produced headwear such as sports caps for the NBL during the 2015–2016 season. In 2016-2017, Mitchell & Ness continued its partnership with the NBL to supply on-court and off-court clothing for the league as the official apparel partner of the competition. For the 2016–2017 season, Mitchell & Ness provided new official on-court basketball jersey and short designs, which were made in Australia and featured structural improvements.

After the 2016–2017 NBL season, the agreement between Mitchell & Ness Australia and the NBL was extended for another two years, lasting until the end of the 2019 season. The NBL’s partnership with Mitchell & Ness then changed to the sporting company then providing the league with headwear designs and stopping production of NBL apparel. In 2022, the 10 teams which make up Australia and New Zealand's NBL are still wearing headwear supplied by Mitchell & Ness. Several of the NBL teams the brand produces headwear for include the Adelaide 36ers, Brisbane Bullets and Melbourne United.

== Sales history ==
Owner Peter Capolino reported to Sports Illustrated that Mitchell & Ness had annual sales revenue of $1.5 million per-year in 1998. Revenues rose to $2.2 million in 1999 and were $2.8 million in 2000. Sales were more than $5 million in 2001 according to ESPN.com while Capolino reported annual sales of $4.5 million in 2001 to USA Today. Sales rose to $23 million in 2002.

== Popular products ==
Mitchell & Ness's throwback uniforms were created to reproduce classic to very modern team and player sports jerseys which are either no longer available or hard to find. Mitchell & Ness began producing baseball (Cooperstown Collection) jerseys in 1988, although the company gained popularity in the international retail market ten years after with the introduction of the NBA "Hardwood Classics" line. The company later moved on to reproducing popular throwbacks of American football and NHL players.

USA Today reported that as of May 2002, the most popular NBA players for Mitchell & Ness were Michael Jordan and Julius Erving, followed by Magic Johnson, Wilt Chamberlain, Jerry West, and Larry Bird.

== Philadelphia sports ==
The company sponsored a Turn Back the Clock alumni game on November 21, 2003, between players from the 1988 Temple Owls and 1985 Villanova Wildcats at the Liacouras Center on the campus of Temple University in North Philadelphia.

Mitchell & Ness partnered with the Betsy Ross House to present an exhibition opening May 22, 2009, called "Play Ball! A History of Baseball in Philadelphia."
