= Sauve, Gard =

Sauve
- Commune
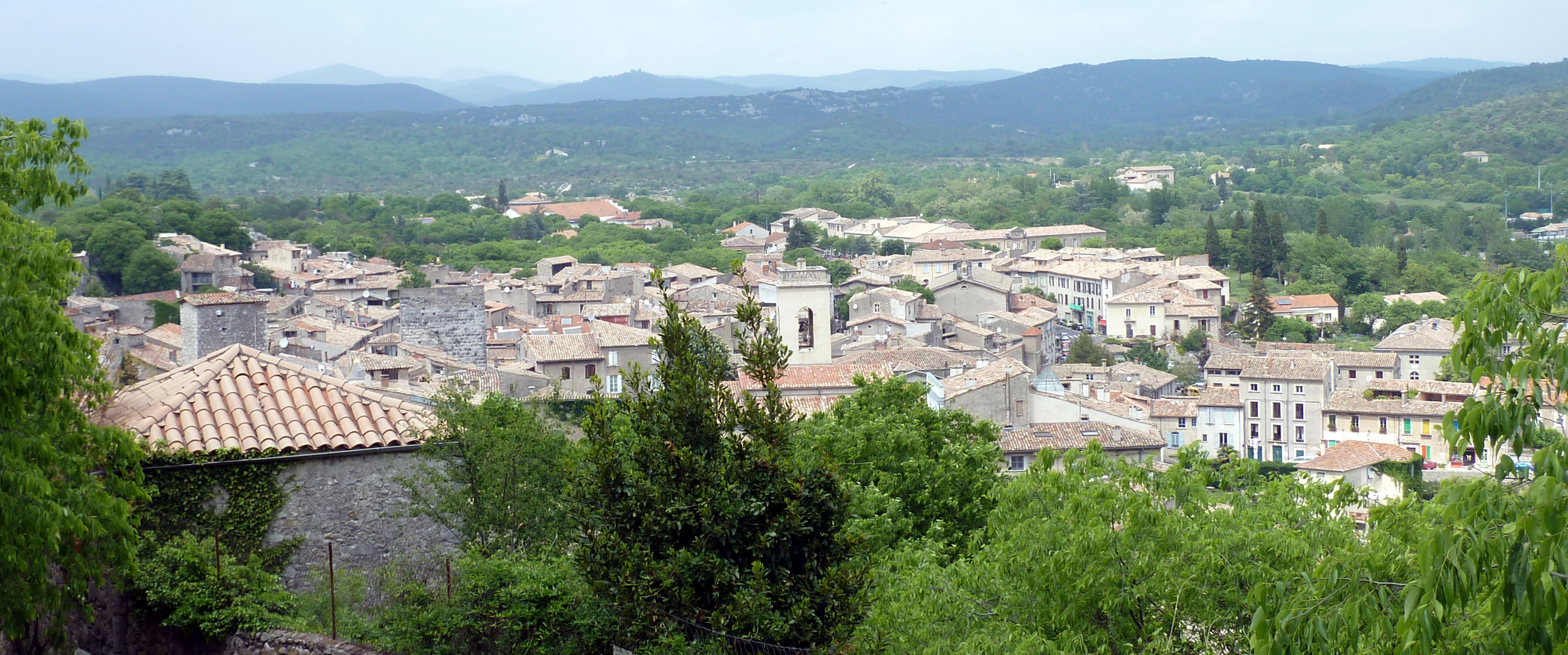
- A general view of Sauve

- Coat of arms
- Location of Sauve
- Location within France Location within Occitanie
- Coordinates: 43°56′36″N 3°56′57″E
- Country: France
- Region: Occitania
- Department: Gard
- Arrondissement: Le Vigan
- Canton: Quissac

Government
  - Mayor (2020–2026): Olivier Gaillard
- Area^{1}: 31.56 km^{2} (12.19 sq mi)
- Highest elevation: 470 m (1,540 ft)
- Lowest elevation: 75 m (246 ft)
- Population (2023): 1,988
  - Density: 62.99/km^{2} (163.1/sq mi)
- Time zone: UTC+01:00 (CET)
  - Summer (DST): UTC+02:00 (CEST)
- INSEE/Postal code: 30311 /30610
- ^{1} French Land Register data, which excludes lakes, ponds, glaciers > 1 km^{2} (0.386 sq mi or 247 acres) and river estuaries.

Sauve (French pronunciation: [sov]; Occitan: Saves) is a commune in the Gard department in southern France.

== Population ==
Historical population
Year	Pop.	±% p.a.
1968	1,328	—
1975	1,277	−0.56%
1982	1,417	+1.50%
1990	1,606	+1.58%
1999	1,690	+0.57%
2007	1,856	+1.18%
2012	1,969	+1.19%
2017	1,928	−0.42%
2023	1,988	+0.51%
Source: INSEE

== Personalities ==
In the early 1990s, American underground comic artist Robert Crumb traded six of his sketchbooks for a townhouse in Sauve.

The late drummer of the Rolling Stones, Charlie Watts (1941–2021) had an apartment in the town.

Roger Katan, French-American architect, planner, sculptor, and activist, resides in the village.

== International relations ==
Sauve is twinned with:

- (United Kingdom) Broughton in Hampshire, England

== See also ==
- Communes of the Gard department
