= Glenn H. Schiffman =

American businessman

- Born: 1970 or 1971 (age 55–56)
- Education: Duke University
- Occupation: Businessman
- Spouse: Stacy Schiffman

Glenn H. Schiffman is an American businessman, philanthropist, and Chief Financial Officer of Fanatics. He was appointed to the position at Fanatics in August 2021, following his tenure as Chief Financial Officer at IAC. Prior to IAC, he was a Senior Managing Director at Guggenheim Securities.

== Early life and education ==
Schiffman graduated from Duke University with a B.A. in Economics and History.

== Career ==
=== Lehman Brothers 1991-2011 ===
He began his career at Lehman Brothers in 1991, where he spent 18 years in roles including Co-Head of the Global Media Group and Head of Asia-Pacific Investment Banking. In these positions, Schiffman helped build the M&A business, leading it to win a number of awards, including FinanceAsia's Momentum House of the Year for 2007 and the number one position in completed M&A deals for 2008.

During his tenure at Lehman Brothers, Schiffman was credited with executing deals in excess of $100 billion. Schiffman was involved in the sale of Lehman's Asian Business to Nomura in September 2008. Schiffman later served as Head of Investment Banking Asia-Pacific and was promoted to Head of Investment Banking for the Americas and CEO of Nomura Securities North America in 2010.

From 2011 to 2013, Schiffman was a Partner at The Raine Group before becoming a Senior Managing Director at Guggenheim Securities from 2013 to 2016.

=== IAC 2016-2020 ===
In 2016, Schiffman joined IAC as Executive Vice President and Chief Financial Officer.

Between February 2016 and February 2017, Schiffman used a capital allocation strategy to sell company assets to focus on more profitable areas of business. Schiffman helped IAC gain $365 million in stocks through buybacks, half of which was funded through company divestments.

Due to his work with brand executives, Schiffman helped the company roster exceed more than 150 brands, such as Match.com and Angi Inc., through deals, financings, and refinancings.

In June 2019, Schiffman published a column in CFO Magazine detailing his business strategies.

=== CFO of Fanatics 2021 ===
In July 2021, it was announced that Schiffman would take over as CFO of Fanatics. At Fanatics, Schiffman is responsible for overseeing the company's financial operations as it expands into new business areas outside of merchandise. Schiffman also manages a team that focuses on mergers and acquisitions, investor relations, and capital raising, among other responsibilities.

Schiffman has appeared on The Modern CFO podcast and has been interviewed by Sportico, where he discussed his finance strategy at Fanatics. In August 2025, Schiffman was interviewed by CFO, where he discussed his role on the senior management team. In October 2025, Schiffman was interviewed by former governor of Ohio, John Kasich, on his Keep Faith America platform, where he discussed his career in investment banking and his views on economic issues, including national debt and fiscal policy.

== Other roles ==
Schiffman serves on the Board of Directors of Match Group, Angi and Vimeo, where he also serves as chairman. He was interim Chief Financial Officer of Angi Inc. from September 2017 until August 2019 and again from December 2020 until June 2021.

He is a member of the National Committee on United States-China Relations and a member of the Duke Children's National Leadership Council. He previously served on the Duke Health Board of Visitors from May 2008 until June 2019 and the Duke School of Medicine Board of Visitors from July 2019 until June 2020.

In April 2025, Schiffman joined Fanatics board of directors.

== Awards and honors ==
In November 2017, Schiffman was named Institutional Investor's CFO of the Year for the Mid-cap Internet Sector. In November 2019, he was named as one of Institutional Investor's Best CFOs on the Sell-Side for the Internet Sector.

Schiffman was named Institutional Investor's CFO of the Year 2021 for the Sell-Side.

== Philanthropy ==
In 2014, Schiffman and his wife, Stacy Schiffman, pledged $1 million to create a pediatric cancer research fund at Duke Children's Hospital & Health Center. In 2019, a further million-dollar donation by the Schiffmans helped provide bridge funding for Duke Children's research on alveolar rhabdomyosarcoma (RMS), which was later awarded a National Cancer Institute Moonshot grant. Schiffman is a supporter of the university's athletics programs with donations to endow student-athlete scholarships earmarked specifically for football team members from underrepresented communities, as well as upgrades to the Duke Football facilities. In 2023, the brick plaza entrance to the Yoh Football Center was renamed Schiffman Family Plaza. Schiffman is Founder and Chairman of the Valerie Fund Endowment and a member of the Valerie Fund's Board of Advisors.
