= Bernard Shiffman =

American mathematician

Bernard Shiffman (born 23 June 1942) is an American mathematician, specializing in complex geometry and analysis of complex manifolds.

== Education and career ==
Shiffman received in 1964 from Massachusetts Institute of Technology (MIT) a bachelor's degree and in 1968 from the University of California, Berkeley a PhD under Shiing-Shen Chern with thesis On the removal of singularities in several complex variables. Shiffman was at MIT a C.L.E. Moore Instructor from 1968 to 1970 and at Yale University an assistant professor from 1970 to 1973. At Johns Hopkins University he was from 1973 to 1977 an associate professor and is from 1977 a full professor; he was the chair of the department of mathematics from 1990 to 1993 and again from 2012 to 2014. He has held visiting positions in the US, France, Germany, and Sweden.

For the two academic years 1973–1975 Shiffman was a Sloan Research Fellow. From 1993 to 2005 he was editor-in-chief of The American Journal of Mathematics. He was elected a Fellow of the American Mathematical Society in 2012.

His father was the mathematician Max Shiffman.

== Selected publications ==
=== Articles ===
- Shiffman, Bernard (1968). "On the removal of singularities of analytic sets" (PDF). Michigan Math. J. 15 (1): 111–120. doi:10.1307/mmj/1028999912.
- Shiffman, Bernard (1971). "Extension of holomorphic maps into hermitian manifolds". Mathematische Annalen. 194 (4): 249–258. doi:10.1007/BF01350128. S2CID 120581965.
- with Maurizio Cornalba: Cornalba, Maurizio; Shiffman, Bernard (1972). "A counterexample to the "Transcendental Bezout problem"". Annals of Mathematics. Second Series. 96 (2): 402–406. doi:10.2307/1970794. JSTOR 1970794.
- with Reese Harvey: Harvey, Reese; Shiffman, Bernard (1974). "A characterization of holomorphic chains". Annals of Mathematics. Second Series. 99 (3): 553–587. doi:10.2307/1971062. JSTOR 1971062.
- Shiffman, Bernard (1977). "Holomorphic curves in algebraic manifolds". Bull. Amer. Math. Soc. 83 (4): 553–568. doi:10.1090/S0002-9904-1977-14323-1. (survey article, an expanded version of an invited address given at the Cambridge, Mass., meeting of the AMS on 25 October 1975)
- with Robert E. Molzon and Nessim Sibony: Molzon, Robert E.; Shiffman, Bernard; Sibony, Nessim (1981). "Average growth estimates for hyperplane sections of entire analytic sets". Math. Ann. 257 (1): 43–59. doi:10.1007/BF01450654. S2CID 122989295.
- with Shanyu Ji and János Kollár: Ji, Shanyu; Kollár, János; Shiffman, Bernard (1992). "A global Łojasiewicz inequality for algebraic varieties". Transactions of the American Mathematical Society. 329 (2): 813–818. doi:10.1090/S0002-9947-1992-1046016-6.
- with Alexander Russakovskii: Russakovskii, Alexander; Shiffman, Bernard (1997). "Value distribution for sequences of rational mappings and complex dynamics". Indiana University Mathematics Journal. 46 (3): 897–932. arXiv:math/9604204. doi:10.1512/iumj.1997.46.1441. JSTOR 24899647. S2CID 17805351.
- with Steven Zelditch: Shiffman, Bernard; Zelditch, Steve (1999). "Distribution of zeros of random and quantum chaotic sections of positive line bundles". Communications in Mathematical Physics. 200 (3): 661–683. arXiv:math/9803052. Bibcode:1999CMaPh.200..661S. doi:10.1007/s002200050544. S2CID 6856205.
- with Pavel Bleher and S. Zelditch: Bleher, Pavel; Shiffman, Bernard; Zelditch, Steve (2000). "Universality and scaling of correlations between zeros on complex manifolds". Inventiones Mathematicae. 142 (2): 351–395. arXiv:math-ph/9904020. Bibcode:2000InMat.142..351B. doi:10.1007/s002220000092. S2CID 46315. arXiv preprint
- with Michael R. Douglas and S. Zelditch: Douglas, Michael R.; Shiffman, Bernard; Zelditch, Steve (2004). "Critical points and supersymmetric vacua I". Communications in Mathematical Physics. 252 (1–3): 325–358. arXiv:math/0402326. Bibcode:2004CMaPh.252..325D. doi:10.1007/s00220-004-1228-y. S2CID 7020709.

=== Books ===
- with Andrew J. Sommese: Vanishing theories on complex manifolds, Progress in Mathematics 56, Birkhäuser Verlag 1985.
