= Robert Schiffmann =

American inventor and writer

Robert Franz Schiffmann (February 11, 1935 – September 4, 2021) was an American inventor and writer.

== Biography ==
Schiffmann was born on February 11, 1935 in Manhattan, New York City, to Franz Schiffmann, a tool and die maker, and Sophie (Bolling) Schiffmann, a homemaker. He grew up in a brownstone on West 88th Street, which he later transformed into his primary research lab.

Schiffmann obtained a bachelor's degree in pharmacy from Columbia University in 1955 and a master's degree in analytical science and physical chemistry from Purdue University in 1959.

== Career ==
Schiffmann began his career at DCA Food Industries in 1961, where he experimented with microwaves and invented large microwave doughnut fryers. He later worked at Bedrosian & Associates, focusing on consumer food product development.

In 1978, Schiffmann founded R.F. Schiffmann & Associates, contributing to advancements in microwave ovens, food preparation, and safety standards. He also served as president of the International Microwave Power Institute.

During his career, Schiffmann developed numerous applications, including the Micro Cuisine, a specialized dish for improved microwave cooking, and contributed to the Half Time Oven, which combined microwave and conventional heating elements to reduce cooking times. His work also encompassed medical and dental tool sterilization and plasma warming techniques.

Schiffmann was also on Quora as a writer.

== Awards and recognition ==
- Fellow of the International Microwave Power Institute
- Metaxas Microwave Pioneer Award
