= Pearl Schiff =

American novelist

- Born: Pearl Cohen; May 12, 1916; Boston, Massachusetts, US
- Died: July 28, 2005 (aged 89); Jamaica Plain, Boston, Massachusetts, US
- Education: Radcliffe College
- Occupations: Novelist; Proofreader
- Writing career
- Genre: Popular fiction
- Notable works: Scollay Square (1952); Walk a Narrow Line (1966)

Pearl Schiff (May 12, 1916 – July 28, 2005) was an American author from Boston, Massachusetts. She is best known for her first novel, Scollay Square, which made The New York Times Best Seller list in 1952. The novel, about an upper-class woman's affair with a sailor in Boston's red-light district, was considered scandalous at the time.

== Life and career ==
Schiff was born to immigrant parents, grew up in Boston, and worked her way through college at Radcliffe, graduating in 1937. The Russian poet Itzik Feffer was her cousin. She married Dr. Louis Schiff, a podiatrist, and lived for some time on Boston's Beacon Hill, a few blocks away from the considerably less affluent Scollay Square. At the time, Scollay Square was Boston's red-light district, as well as home to thousands of low-income and working-class residents; just a few years later, in the early 1960s, the neighborhood was razed to make room for Government Center.

Schiff wrote her first novel, Scollay Square, while raising her two young children, Arthur and Janet. In a 1953 interview, she said she could not have written the book without the support of her husband, who accompanied her several nights a week to the bars and nightclubs of Scollay Square to gather material. "All my life, my mother told me not to go through Scollay Square and it was a place I was always curious about", she said. The novel is set in the years following World War II, when the area was teeming with sailors. The protagonist, Beth Prentiss, is an upper-class young woman from Beacon Hill who meets a sailor, Jerry Blake, in a Scollay Square tavern, and has an affair with him. Through Jerry, Beth meets people whose backgrounds are different from her own, such as Emily Lazarro, an Italian waitress and single mother who lives in a North End tenement. Jerry turns out not to be the marrying type, and Beth ends her relationship with him. She then falls in love with her Beacon Hill neighbor, Martin Bernstein, a Jewish labor lawyer.

While researching the novel, Schiff made many friends in Scollay Square. When it was published, she feared they might be offended; instead, several of them bought copies and asked her to autograph them. She later said that their approval meant more to her than good reviews. The book made The New York Times Best Seller list in October 1952 and stayed there for three weeks.

Walk a Narrow Line, Schiff's second novel, was published in 1966. The novel, about a single mother raising a daughter in Boston, had to be published in England because American publishing houses were wary of books about divorced women.

Schiff worked as a proofreader and book reviewer for The Boston Globe for many years. After retiring in 1978, she led tours of the Globe facility. Her husband died in 1989. In her later years she lived in Sharon, Massachusetts, where she taught a memoir-writing class for the Council on Aging, and was included as a subject of study in the women's history curriculum at Sharon High School. She died in 2005 at the Goddard Nursing Home in Jamaica Plain.

== Critical reception ==
Although Scollay Square was a best seller, not all the reviews were positive. Oren Curtiss, a Globe reviewer writing in August 1952, predicted that the book would sell well, despite offending some readers, but called the plot "somewhat contrived". A reviewer at Kirkus Reviews accused Schiff of resorting to social stereotypes and easy solutions. The novel is characterized as "scandalous", "sensational", and "taboo-breaking" in Schiff's Boston Globe obituary.

== Works ==
- Scollay Square (1952). Rinehart.
- Walk a Narrow Line (1966). Frederick Muller.
- The Story of Pearl: Cultured and Otherwise (2006). Xlibris. ISBN 978-1413487282
