= Ed Valenti =

American television personality and entrepreneur

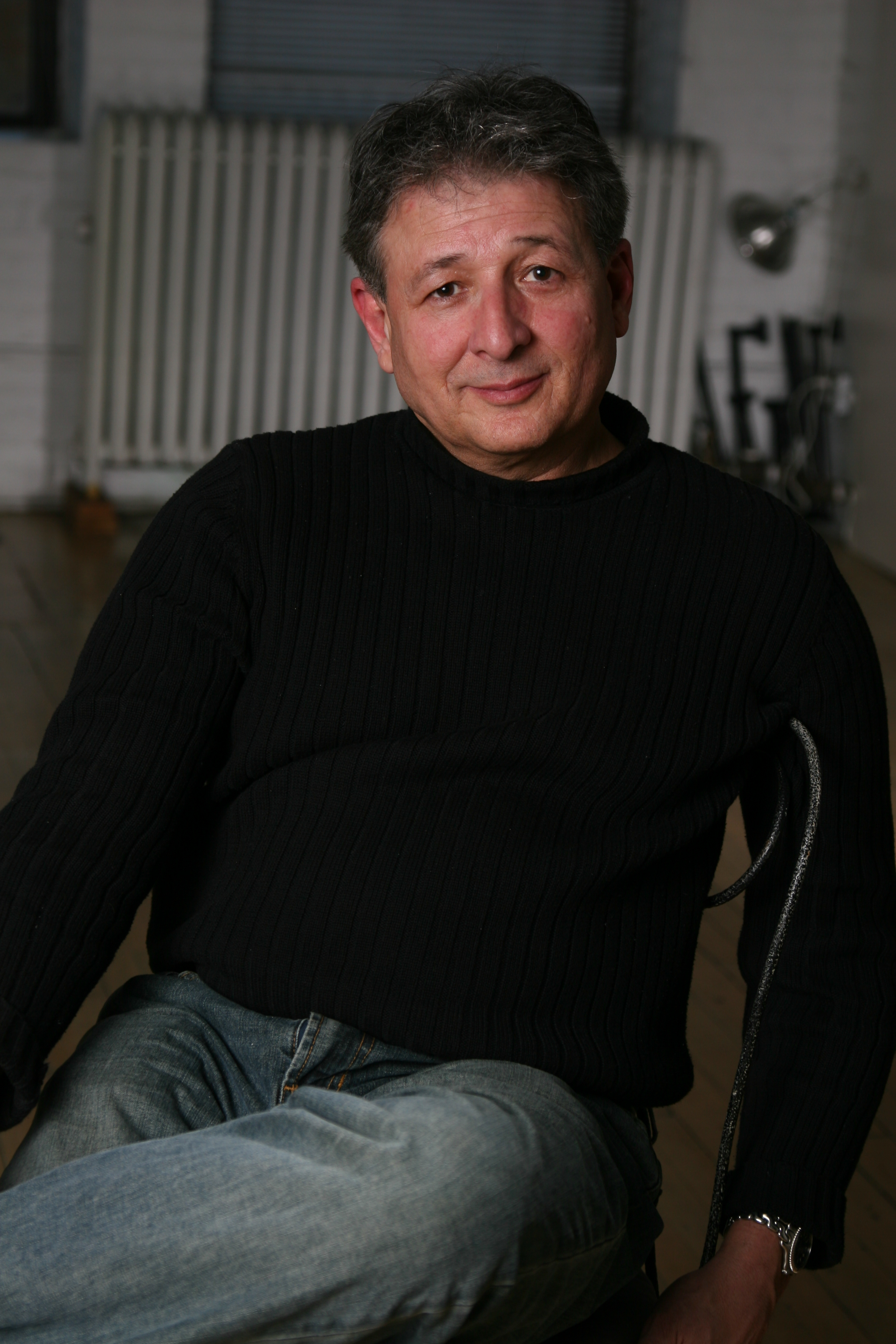
- Born: Ed Valenti; United States
- Occupation: Founder of PriMedia Inc (previously Dial Media)
- Years active: 1970s-present
- Known for: Co-creator of Ginsu knife

Ed Valenti is an American Television personality, advertising pioneer, and entrepreneur. In the 1970s he founded Dial Media, which created numerous techniques that transformed infomercials on television in the United States and beyond. His techniques were used on a variety of products but were best known for their use in the now legendary Ginsu knife commercial. They sold millions of units across America between the mid-70s to mid-80s and were eventually acquired by Warren Buffett's Berkshire Hathaway in 1985 for an undisclosed sum.

Valenti and his business partner Barry Becher founded Dial Media, Inc., one of the first major infomercial companies in the world. Using various evolutionary selling techniques, Valenti sold over $500 million worth of units of various products from the 1970s onwards using mostly TV.

Valenti is credited with coining a number of phrases widely adopted by advertisers today, including: “But wait, there’s more!”, “Now how much would you pay?” and “This is a limited-time offer, so call now.”

== Career ==
In the early 1970s, Valenti worked as an Advertising Executive at an NBC TV Affiliate, using clever "first time" marketing techniques such as toll free numbers, credit card payment options, with unique slogans & phrases on the TV ads. He and his friend Barry Becher, bought an unusual painting pad gadget for their first product. The commercial featured a man in a tuxedo painting to demonstrate "no drip". The unique commercial was so successful using clever marketing techniques, toll free numbers and catchy slogans and phrases, that the product grossed $10 million is sales.

In the late-1970s, Valenti developed more DR campaigns, namely for a new knife from Douglas Quikut. Despite the extraordinary sharpness of the knife, sales languished in supermarket end cap displays. Despite the quality of the product, Valenti believed the Douglas Quikut name wasn't strong enough or unique enough and suggested a rebrand. Along with his co-founder of Dial Media, they came up with the brand name Ginsu and the life of a revolutionary kitchen item was born.

The first ad for the ginsu aired in 1978 instantly becoming an iconic pop culture in US television history. The ads started with Ed karate chopping a board with the announcer saying, "In Japan, the hand can be used like a knife". Then Ed went on to karate chop a tomato with the announcer continuing, "but that method doesn't wrork on a tomato. That's why you need the Ginsu".The ad continues with Ed cutting tin cans, nails and hoses, then on to cutting bread, ham, meat and vegetables demonstrating that the knife never dulled. This form of comparison demonstrated MIarketing took America by storm and laid the foundations for the knife to become one of the best selling household products of the 1970s/80s. The move kickstarted a movement that has grown to a $150 billion industry in the United States today. Not only did the knife prove hugely successful, but the direct response ads were also revolutionary. The combination of great product and creative advertising led Valenti and his business partners to pocket millions from the sales of the knife over a period lasting around a decade until the mid-1980s. The revenue also meant that the annual ad spend could be really aggressive. At one point in the late 1970s, Valenti's Dial Media was spending $20 million on infomercials annually, which according to the Washington Post was more than The Coca-Cola Company were spending on television advertising at the time.

The knife, the adverts and the buying format started all sorts of new markets. It could be argued shopping channels like QVC borrowed heavily the techniques created by Valenti and his business partner. One of these was the way infomercials for Ginsu were shot, often using phrases like "but wait, there's more!" to keep the viewer guessing what the knife would be used for next and how many more knives were in the offer. QVC then adopted similar product display presentations in the 1980s onwards to sell huge numbers of products around the clock. The techniques all came from Valenti's Ginsu advertisements, where the ads would show the knife cutting through something as simple as a tomato to tin cans.

The Ginsu became a household name by the late 1970s, and was eventually acquired by Berkshire Hathaway for an undisclosed sum. Ginsu around this time was a huge pop culture brand, Jerry Seinfeld, Johnny Carson, Saturday Night Live, Jay Leno and numerous movies, and TV shows used Ginsu in their routines and scripts. The Ginsu became so popular a prehistoric shark, Cretoxyrhina Mantelli, was nicknamed "the ginsu shark" due to the sharpness of its teeth.

Valenti continued to use the techniques he developed into the late 1980s and beyond, selling products such as Armourcote Cookware, Miracle Painter, Miracle slicer and numerous other all using the same marketing techniques. Decades later Ginsu appeared in several documentaries and was included in The World's Greatest Inventions by The History Channel. He also appeared on a CNBC Originals documentary in 2009 about his work in the field of infomercials.

Over the period of a number of decades, Valenti and his co-founder Barry Becher sold over $500 million in products, with a large portion of those sales coming from the Ginsu. The legacy of the knife and its uses continued well into the 21st century. In 2024, a Hezbollah leader was killed using a DOD weapon that was modeled on the original Ginsu, dubbed "The Flying Ginsu".

== Recognition ==
A stretch of road in Rhode Island was named Ginsu Way in honor of Valenti's achievements.

== Books ==
- "The Wisdom of Ginsu: Carve Yourself a Piece of the American Dream". Career Press (March 2005). ISBN 978-1564148032
