= Max Shiffman =

American mathematician

Max Shiffman (30 October 1914, New York City – 2 July 2000, Hayward, California) was an American mathematician, specializing in the calculus of variations, partial differential equations, and hydrodynamics. He was a Guggenheim Fellow for the academic year 1951–1952.

== Biography ==
Max Shiffman graduated with a bachelor's degree from City College of New York (CNNY) and then graduated in 1938 with a Ph.D. from New York University (NYU). His thesis was entitled The Plateau Problem for Minimal Surfaces of Arbitrary Topological Structure and his thesis advisor was Richard Courant. According to Peter Lax, Shiffman was "Courant's most brilliant student in America". Shiffman gave a one-hour address at a meeting of the American Mathematical Society. He was an instructor at CCNY in 1939–42. In 1942 at NYU he joined a research project funded by the Office of Scientific Research and Development. From 1945 to 1948 he was an associate professor at NYU, where he influenced many graduate students, including Clifford Gardner, Joe Keller, Martin Kruskal, Peter Lax, Cathleen Morawetz, and Louis Nirenberg. In 1948 Gábor Szegő hired Shiffman as a full professor at Stanford University. Szegő also brought to the Stanford mathematics department Donald C. Spencer, Albert Charles Schaeffer, Paul Garabedian, and Richard E. Bellman. Shiffman and Bellman introduced a number of modern mathematics courses at Stanford. Shiffman was the first to teach at Stanford a course on functional analysis. Merrill M. Flood's 1952 introduction to non-Soviet mathematicians of Kantorovich's 1939 paper Mathematical Methods of Organizing and Planning Production is due to Shiffman in 1949.

His brilliant career came to a tragic halt in 1951, due to a schizophrenic breakdown. He recovered and continued his research and teaching until a second breakdown in 1956. With the support of his friends and a generous trustee of Stanford University, he was admitted to Chestnut Lodge, a prestigious psychiatric institute. After nine years of therapy he was transferred to Agnews State Hospital in California, where Max took advantage of a state law and sued in court to be released; he convinced a jury that he was mentally competent.

From 1965 to 1967 Shiffman held at Stanford a research appointment, mainly due to the efforts of Donald C. Spencer. At California State University, Hayward Shiffman was a full professor from 1967 to 1981, when he retired as professor emeritus.

Much of Shiffman’s work dealt with Plateau’s problem. He showed that if a boundary curve spans two minimal surfaces that are relative minima, then it also spans one which is not a relative minimum. In one of his last publications he showed that a doubly connected minimal surface whose boundary consists of two circles on parallel planes intersects any other parallel plane in a circle. Shiffman also worked on problems of conformal mapping, and the differentiability and analyticity of solutions of double integral variational problems. ... Shiffman used variational methods to study the flow of fluids, incompressible and compressible. He proved a basic theorem about compressible flows around bodies with prescribed subsonic speed at infinity; he showed that such flows are smooth until the flow becomes sonic. The technical tool he used, altering the equation of state, is called “shiffmanization” by cognoscenti.

In the summer of 1949 Shiffman gave a new proof of von Neumann's minimax theorem with a generalization to concave-convex functions. Maurice Sion generalized Shiffman's result to Sion's minimax theorem, published in 1958.

In 1938 Bella Manel, a mathematics graduate student at NYU, married Max Shiffman. She received her PhD in 1939 with thesis advisor Richard Courant. Max and Bella Shiffman divorced in 1957, after the birth of their two sons. Upon his death Max Shiffman was survived by his sons, Bernard, a professor of mathematics, and David, an owner of an investment company, and by five grandchildren.

== Selected publications ==
- Shiffman, M. (1939). "The Plateau Problem for Non-Relative Minima". Proceedings of the National Academy of Sciences. 25 (4): 215–220. Bibcode:1939PNAS...25..215S. doi:10.1073/pnas.25.4.215. PMC 1077750. PMID 16588292.
- Shiffman, Max (1939). "The Plateau Problem for Minimal Surfaces of Arbitrary Topological Structure". American Journal of Mathematics. 61 (4): 853–882. doi:10.2307/2371631. JSTOR 2371631.
- Shiffman, Max (1942). "Unstable Minimal Surfaces with Several Boundaries". Annals of Mathematics. 43 (2): 197–222. doi:10.2307/1968866. JSTOR 1968866.
- Shiffman, M. (1942). "Unstable Minimal Surfaces with Any Rectifiable Boundary". Proceedings of the National Academy of Sciences. 28 (3): 103–108. Bibcode:1942PNAS...28..103S. doi:10.1073/pnas.28.3.103. PMC 1078423. PMID 16578029.
- Shiffman, Max (1947). "Differentiability and Analyticity of Solutions of Double Integral Variational Problems". The Annals of Mathematics. 48 (2): 274–284. doi:10.2307/1969170. JSTOR 1969170.1947
- Shiffman, Max; Spencer, D. C. (1947). "The flow of an ideal incompressible fluid about a lens" (PDF). Quarterly of Applied Mathematics. 5 (3): 270–288. doi:10.1090/qam/22494.
- Shiffman, M. (1952). "On the Existence of Subsonic Flows of a Compressible Fluid". Proceedings of the National Academy of Sciences. 38 (5): 434–438. Bibcode:1952PNAS...38..434S. doi:10.1073/pnas.38.5.434. PMC 1063580. PMID 16589119.
- Shiffman, M. (2016-03-02). "Games of Timing". In Kuhn, Harold William; Tucker, Albert William (eds.). Contributions to the Theory of Games (AM-28). Princeton University Press. pp. 97–124. ISBN 9781400881970; reprint of 1953 original
- Shiffman, Max (1956). "On Surfaces of Stationary Area Bounded by Two Circles, or Convex Curves, in Parallel Planes". Annals of Mathematics. 63 (1): 77–90. doi:10.2307/1969991. JSTOR 1969991.
