= Ronald Shiffman =

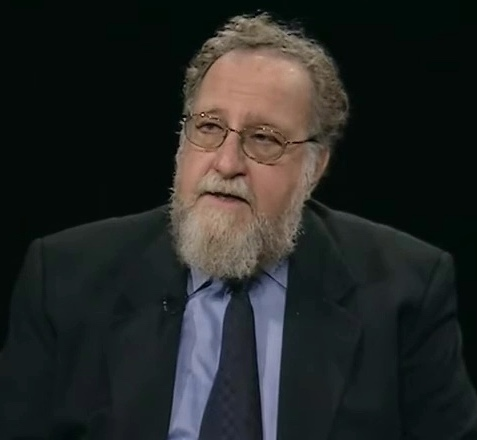
- Shiffman on CUNY TV's The Urban Agenda, 2002
- Born: 1937 (age 88–89); Mandatory Palestine
- Occupations: Urban planner, architect

Ronald Shiffman is a Brooklyn-based city planner, architect, professor, and author.

In 1964 Ron Shiffman co-founded the Pratt Institute Center for Community and Environmental Development (PICCED) now known as the Pratt Center for Community Development (PCCD) – the nation's largest, public interest architectural, planning and community development office in the country. In 1965 working with the Central Brooklyn Coordinating Council and Sen. Robert F. Kennedy he helped to conceive and launch the Bedford Stuyvesant Restoration Corporation one of the nation's first community development corporations. In the early-1970s working with members of the AIA he established within PICCED the Pratt Architectural Collaborative a public interest architectural and design service that assisted low and moderate-income communities. He is recognized as one of the founders of the community-based development movement as well as the community design movement in America and was one of the organizers of what today is known as the Association of Community Design Centers.

== Awards ==
- 1998: Lewis Mumford Award in Development from ADPSR
- 2007: Sam Ratensky Award from the New York City chapter of AIA
- 2012: Jane Jacobs Medal for Life-Time Achievement from the Rockefeller Foundation
- 2013: Planning Pioneer Award from the American Planning Association

== Selected publications ==
- 1967: "The Imperative of Deghettoization: An Answer to Piven and Cloward," Social Work, 1967, pp. 5–11, with Clarence Funnye.
- 1976: "Perspective VII," Journal of Architectural Education 30(2), 1976, p. 16.
- 1990: Comprehensive and integrative planning for community development, Community Development Research Center, Graduate School of Management and Urban Policy, New School for Social Research, 1990, with Susan Motley.
- 1994: "The New Urbanism, the Newer, and the Old," in Places Journal 9(2), 1994, pp. 91–92, with Andres Duany and Susana Torre.
- 1995: "Urban Poverty: The Global Phenomenon of Poverty and Social Marginalization in Our Cities; Facts and Strategies," 1995.
- 1999: "Aesthetics, Demographics and Cohesion," Perspecta, 1999, pp. 76–83, with Kate Winter, Denise Scott Brown, Alan Plattus, Elizabeth Plater-Zyberk, Fred Koetter, and Stephen Kieran.
- 1999: "Facts on the Ground," Perspecta, 1999, pp. 106–111, with Kate Winter, Denise Scott Brown, Alan Plattus, Elizabeth Plater-Zyberk, Fred Koetter, and Stephen Kieran.
- 1999: "Public and Private Space," Perspecta, 1999, pp. 92–97, with Kate Winter, Denise Scott Brown, Alan Plattus, Elizabeth Plater-Zyberk, Fred Koetter, and Stephen Kieran.
- 2010: "Beyond Green Jobs: Seeking a New Paradigm," in What We See, New York: New Village, 2010, pp. 297–305.
- 2012: "Occupying Dissent: A Conversation with Maya Wiley," in Beyond Zuccotti Park, New York: New Village, 2012, pp. 112–124.
- 2012: "Developing the Public Realm: A Conversation with Jonathan Rose," in Beyond Zuccotti Park, New York: New Village, 2012, pp. 364–370.
- 2012: "Programming Public Space: A Conversation with Carlton Brown," in Beyond Zuccotti Park, New York: New Village, 2012, pp. 371–382, with Anastassia Fisyak.
- 2012: "A Call for Actions," in Beyond Zuccotti Park, New York: New Village, 2012, pp. 382–386, with Jeffrey Hou.
