= Otto Schiff (fencer) =

Dutch fencer (1892–1978)

Personal information
- Born: 26 April 1892 Surabaya, Indonesia
- Died: 9 July 1978 (aged 86) The Hague, Netherlands

Sport
- Sport: Fencing

Otto Schiff (26 April 1892 – 9 July 1978) was a Dutch fencer. He competed in the team foil event at the 1928 Summer Olympics.
