= Ginsu =

American brand of direct marketed knives

Ginsu (/ˈɡɪnsuː/; pseudoword meant to evoke the idea of samurai heritage) is a brand of direct marketed knives. The brand is owned by the Douglas Quikut Division of Scott Fetzer, a Berkshire Hathaway Company. The brand was heavily promoted in the late 1970s and 1980s on U.S. television by using infomercials characterized by hawker and hard sell pitch techniques. The commercials generated sales of between two and three million Ginsu sets between 1978 and 1984.

== Early history ==
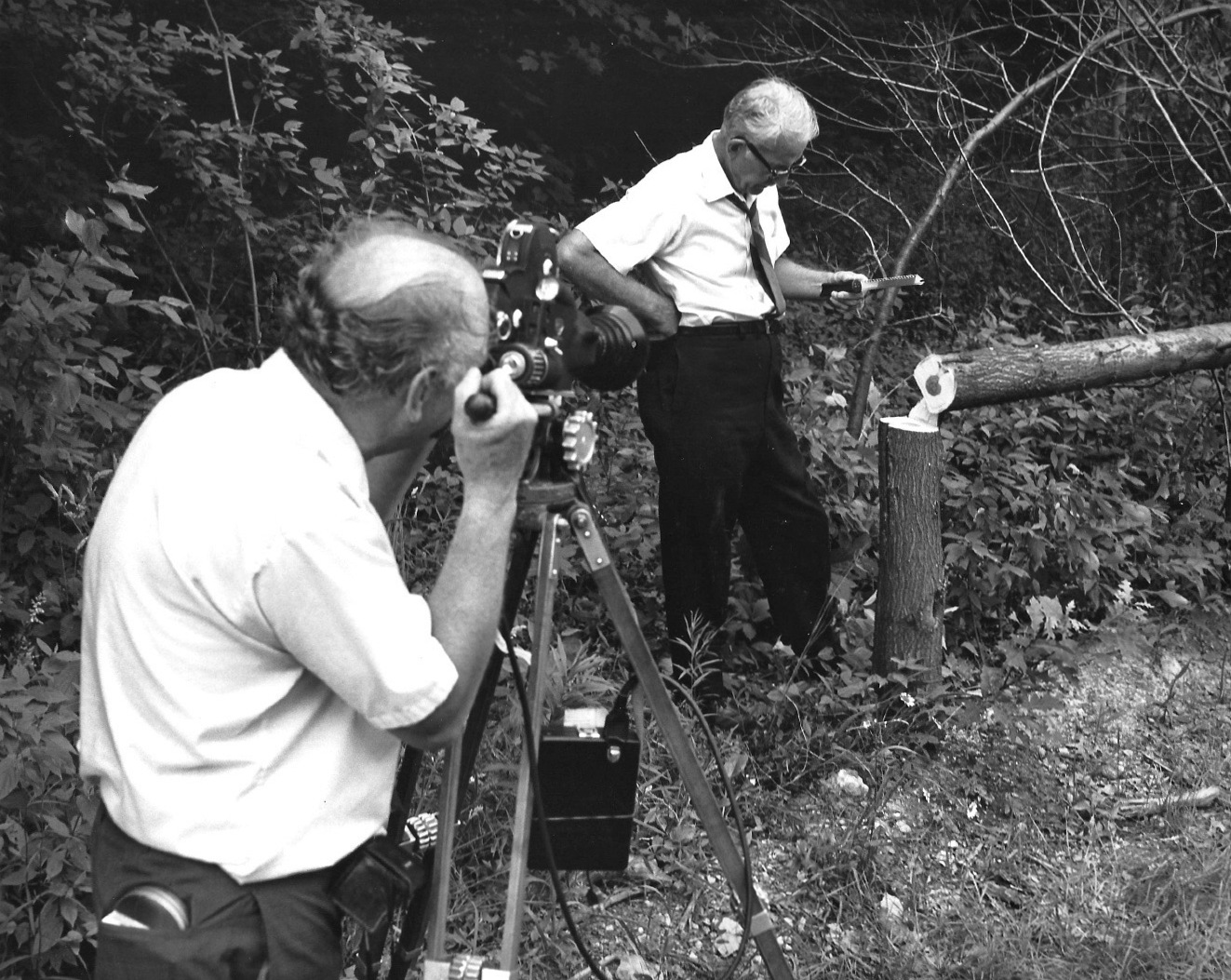
"Great Scott! A knife that cuts trees." A 1968 Cinécraft spot showed how Quikut knives always stayed sharp and could cut a tomato and then a tree.

Ginsu knives are an evolution of a product line developed by the Clyde Castings Company. The company filed for a trademark on the Quikut name for use on carving knives, butcher knives, fruit knives, kitchen knives and can openers in 1921.

Quikut knives were heavily advertised in the U.S. and Canada as inexpensive, stainless steel, hollow ground knives with a lifetime guarantee. Other well known brands used Quikut knives as promotional items, including Lipton Tea and Oxydol.

Large national newspaper, magazine, and radio campaigns were used to market Quikut as far back as the 1930s. A 1938 campaign resulted in orders for 922,000 units. A 1939 campaign included a print ad on the back cover of the Saturday Evening Post.

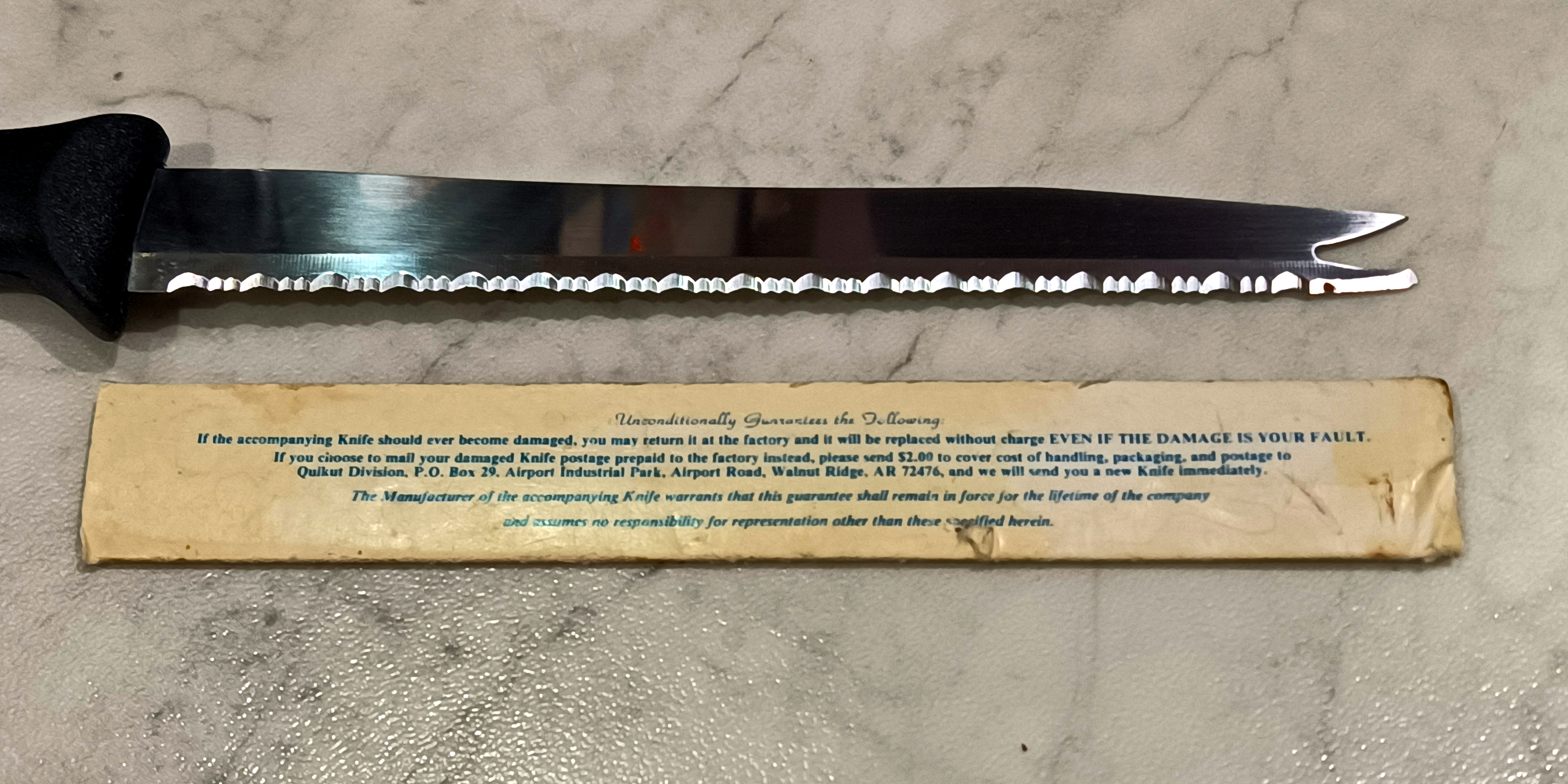
Example of the Quikut lifetime warranty on a pronged cheese knife, promising replacement in the event of any damage, even if damage was the owner's fault

In 1968, Quikut Corporation added spot television to their marketing effort and hired Cinécraft Productions, a sponsored film studio in Cleveland, to make a series of Quikut TV spots. The studio was an early producer of TV spots and made for TV programs. In 1949, Cinécraft had made the first filmed infomercial, a 30-minute ad for the Vitamix blender.

The copy points used in the 1978 and later Ginsu commercials echoed those used by Ron Popeil, the early TV marketer, in the 1950s and the Cinécraft Quikut knife commercials produced in the 1960s.

- “Great Scott…a knife that cuts trees!”
- “And that’s not all.”
- “Well, What do you know? The other side of the knife is sharp enough for a professional meat cutter.”
- “The knife’s safeguard handle, beautifully finished in simulated ivory, is boil proof, dishwasher steam proof, and shatterproof.”
- “guaranteed for life by Quikut.”
- “The new forked tip, lets you carve and serve with one hand.”
- “Yes, but how much? 69 cents! Where?”

== The Ginsu brand ==
Because the brand name "Quikut" was said to lack panache, Ed Valenti, Barry Becher, and copywriter Arthur Schiff created a new brand name that alluded to the exceptional sharpness and durability of a Japanese sword. Ginsu commercials they created promoted “an amazing, low, low price!,” urging viewers to “Order now!” because “Operators are standing by,” and sweetened the pitch with, “But wait, there’s more!” An inescapable staple of television in the 1970s, the brand also became a part of pop culture. Johnny Carson sometimes used the knives in his routines, and Jerry Seinfeld did a Ginsu bit on the “Tonight Show.”

Media scholar Robert Thompson, of Syracuse University, called the Ginsu advertising campaign "the pitch of all pitches." "Ginsu has everything a great direct-response commercial could have," said John Witek, a marketing consultant and author of Response Television: Combat Advertising of the 1980s. "Ginsu had humor, demonstration, and a precisely structured series of premium offers I call 'the lots-for-a-little approach'."

Valenti and Becher later repeated the advertising formula with other products such as the Miracle Slicer, Royal Durasteel mixing bowls, Vacufresh storage containers, the Chainge Adjustable Necklace, and Armourcote Cookware. TV pitchmen Billy Mays and Vince Offer employed the hard-sell informercial to great success in more contemporary times.

While the name Ginsu was invented by Becher, Becher later (satirically) told an interviewer the word translates to, "I never have to work again." In April 2009, a stretch of road in Warwick, Rhode Island, which passes the office of Ed Valenti, was named "Ginsu Way."

The knife brand gained notoriety in 1993 when Lorena Bobbitt used a Ginsu kitchen knife to sever her husband's penis while he slept.

== Company ownership ==
In the 1940s Clyde Castings Company changed their company name to the Quikut Corporation.

In early 1964 the Quikut Corporation merged with an automotive company to become Douglas Quikut. Later in 1964 the firm was purchased by the Scott & Fetzer Company, a holding company that wanted to use the company's plastic molding capabilities to manufacture parts for its Oreck and Kirby lines of vacuum cleaners. Quikut continued as a brand name under the Quikut Division of Scott & Fetzer.

In 1986 Scott & Fetzer was purchased by Berkshire Hathaway of Omaha, NE, an insurance holding company and the Quikut and Ginsu brand knife production moved to a new plant in Walnut Ridge, Arkansas in 1988.

In 2013, Consumer Reports reviewed the Ginsu Chikara knife set in their comparison of fifty knife sets and rated it as their "Best Buy."

In 2022 Ginsu expanded beyond knives and launched a Kamado grill in a partnership with MyDIY Center.

In 2023, Ginsu knives were still manufactured and sold by Douglas Quikut and the Quikut brand is sometimes used as well. The company also manufactures ReadiVac and American Angler brands.
