= The Big Idea (museum) =

Former science museum in Irvine, Scotland

Coordinates: 55°36′32″N 4°41′39″W

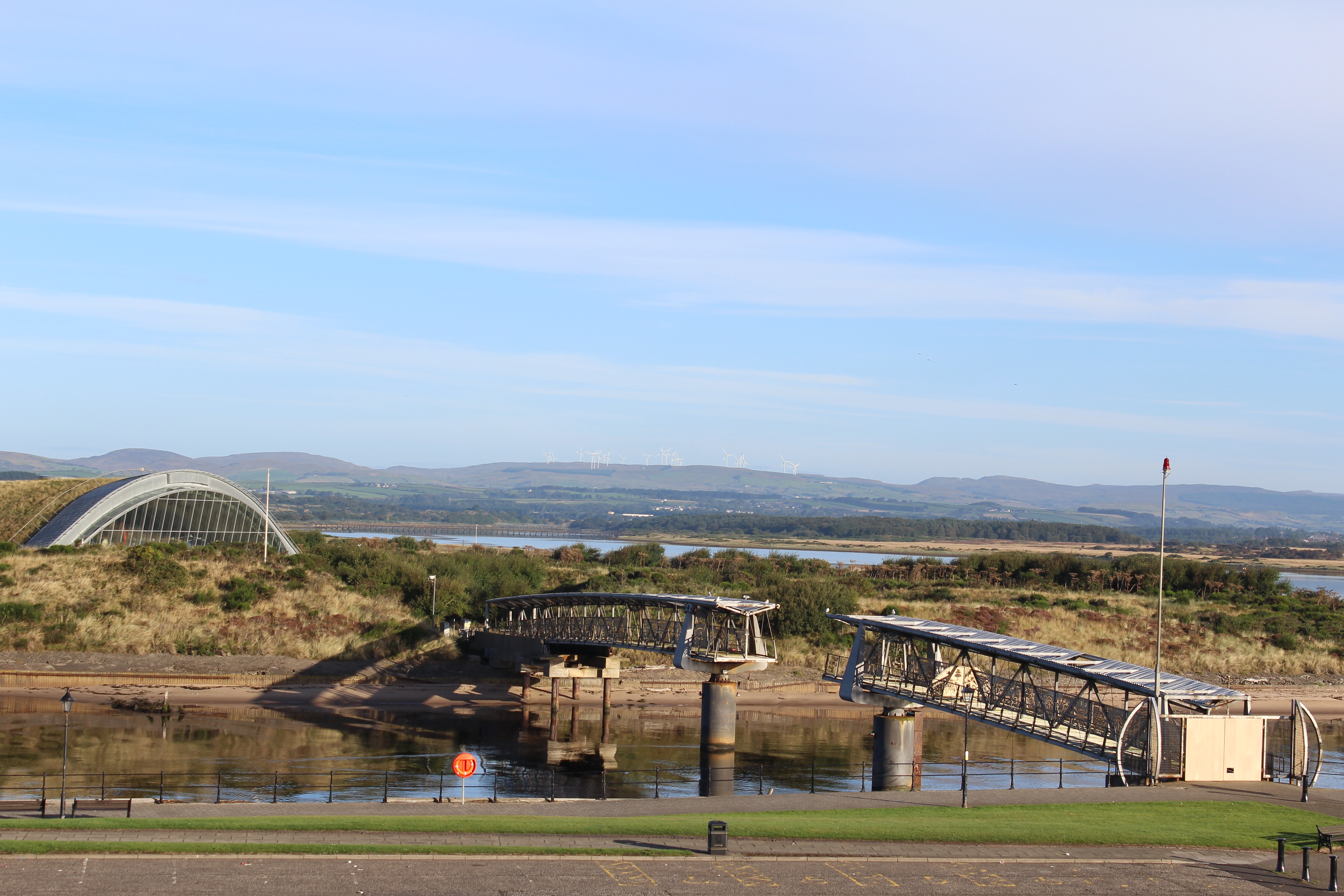
- Established: 15 April 2000
- Dissolved: 15 August 2003
- Location: Irvine, North Ayrshire
- Type: Science Centre
- Visitors: ▼50,000 (2003)
- Director: John Moorhouse
- Architect: Ian Russell

The Big Idea was a science centre located in the town of Irvine, North Ayrshire, Scotland. Located on the former Nobel Explosives manufacturing site on the Ardeer Peninsula, a new science and learning centre was planned in 2000 by the Millennium Commission, to celebrate the history of invention and inventors.

An estimated £14 million was spent for the construction of the exhibition. After only three years of operation, the museum permanently closed in 2003 after a major decline in visitor numbers. As of 2024, no plans have been made for the former museum's redevelopment and it continues to lie abandoned on the peninsula.

== History ==
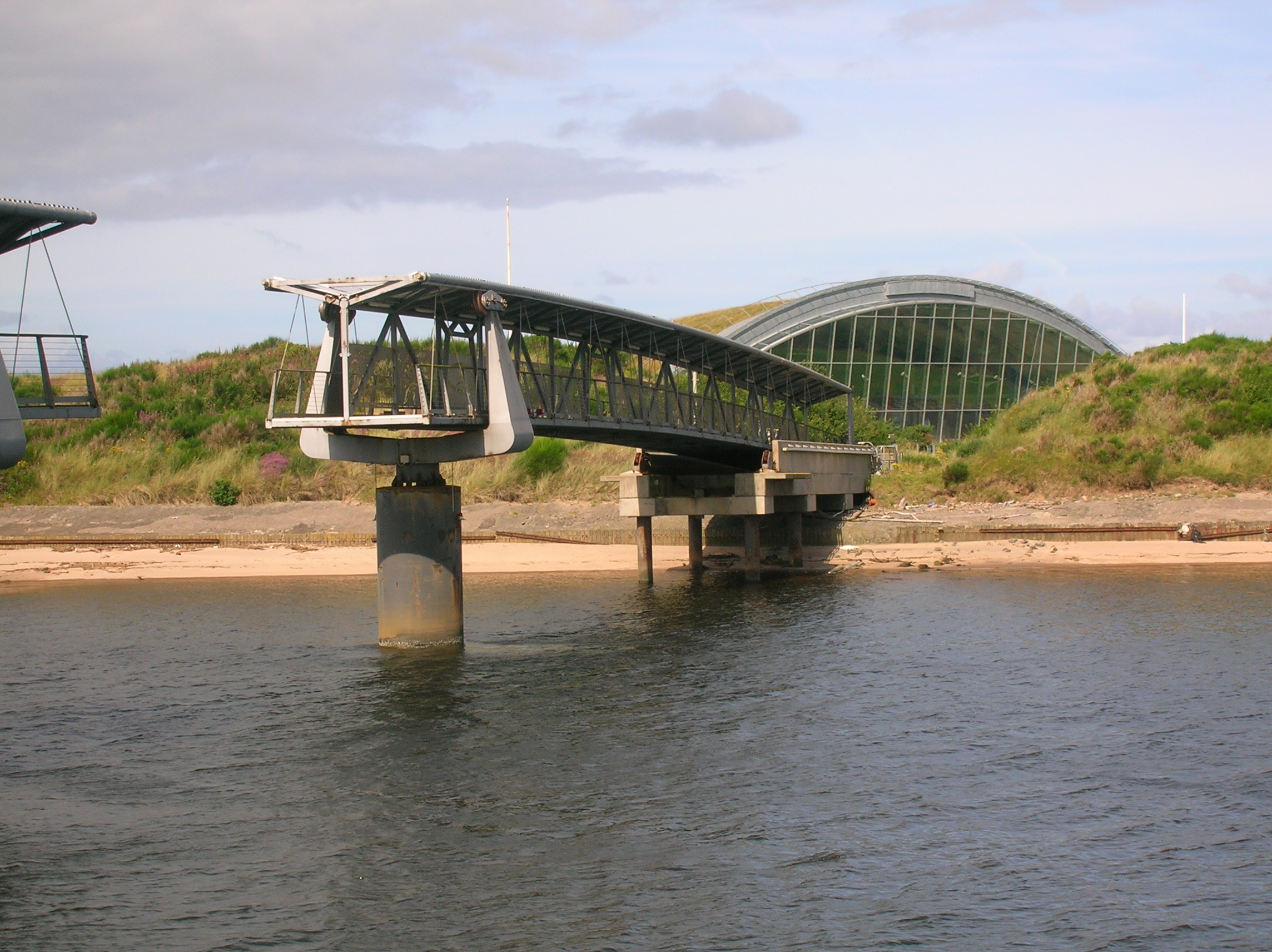
Bridge of Scottish Inventions and the museum building.

As an idea for the new millennium, a museum site was proposed to celebrate inventors and inventions from Scotland and all over the world. The project was created with the help of £5.5M from the Millennium Commission, £5M of European funding, £500,000 from Scottish Enterprise and £3M of private money. Scottish inventors featured included John Napier, William Murdock, Alexander Fleming and John Logie Baird.

The museum featured a wide range of facilities for the public. The main museum consisted of five "focal points". These were Power, Control, Materials, Communication and Mechanisms. The building also contained a sizeable theatre named after Alfred Nobel.

There is a time capsule buried below the reception area of the museum, placed there by students of Ardeer Primary School in June 1999. Access to the facility was via a footbridge, called the 'Bridge of Scottish Inventions'. The bridge was able to change position to facilitate ships passing on the River Irvine. It has remained in the open position since the demise of the complex.

== Visitor numbers ==
Initially successful, visitor numbers to the museum reached 120,000 in its opening year of 2000. However, by 2003, just 50,000 people attended the centre. This was almost 20,000 below the requirement to cover operating costs. The Millennium Experience in London also shared the problem of underperforming visitor numbers on a much larger scale.

== Closure ==
By 2003, the museum was struggling to cover operational costs due to the dwindling visitor numbers. Glasgow Science Centre opened in 2001. This was a larger and more central facility for visitors to the central belt. Brian Donohoe MP stated “The death warrant came around the first day they gave a grant to the science centre in Glasgow. People aren’t going to come by the science centre in Glasgow to look at a similar facility in Irvine.”

The museum closed in early 2003, after failing to attract sufficient visitor numbers. Since its closure, it has remained relatively untouched due to its isolated location and being protected by surrounding private land. As of 2024, no plans have been made for the facility's future.

== See also ==
- List of time capsules
- Irvine Harbour
- Glasgow Science Centre
- Dynamic Earth
