= Millennium Commission =

United Kingdom public body

The Millennium Commission logo

The Millennium Commission, a United Kingdom public body, was set up to celebrate the turn of the millennium. It used funding raised through the UK National Lottery to assist communities in marking the close of the second millennium and celebrating the start of the third. The body was wound up in 2006.

== Composition ==
Set up in 1993 by the National Lottery etc. Act 1993, the Commission was an independent non-departmental public body. Commissioners were appointed by the Queen on the advice of the prime minister; the chair of the commission was, for most of its life, the secretary of state for culture, media and sport, and for most of its life a second government minister was also a commissioner. During Tessa Jowell's tenure as chair the second minister was Richard Caborn, as minister for sport, who preceded Jowell in the department by one day, and who left the department contemporaneously (when Gordon Brown became prime minister).

== Closure ==
The Commission was wound up in December 2006 and its role was transferred to the Big Lottery Fund.

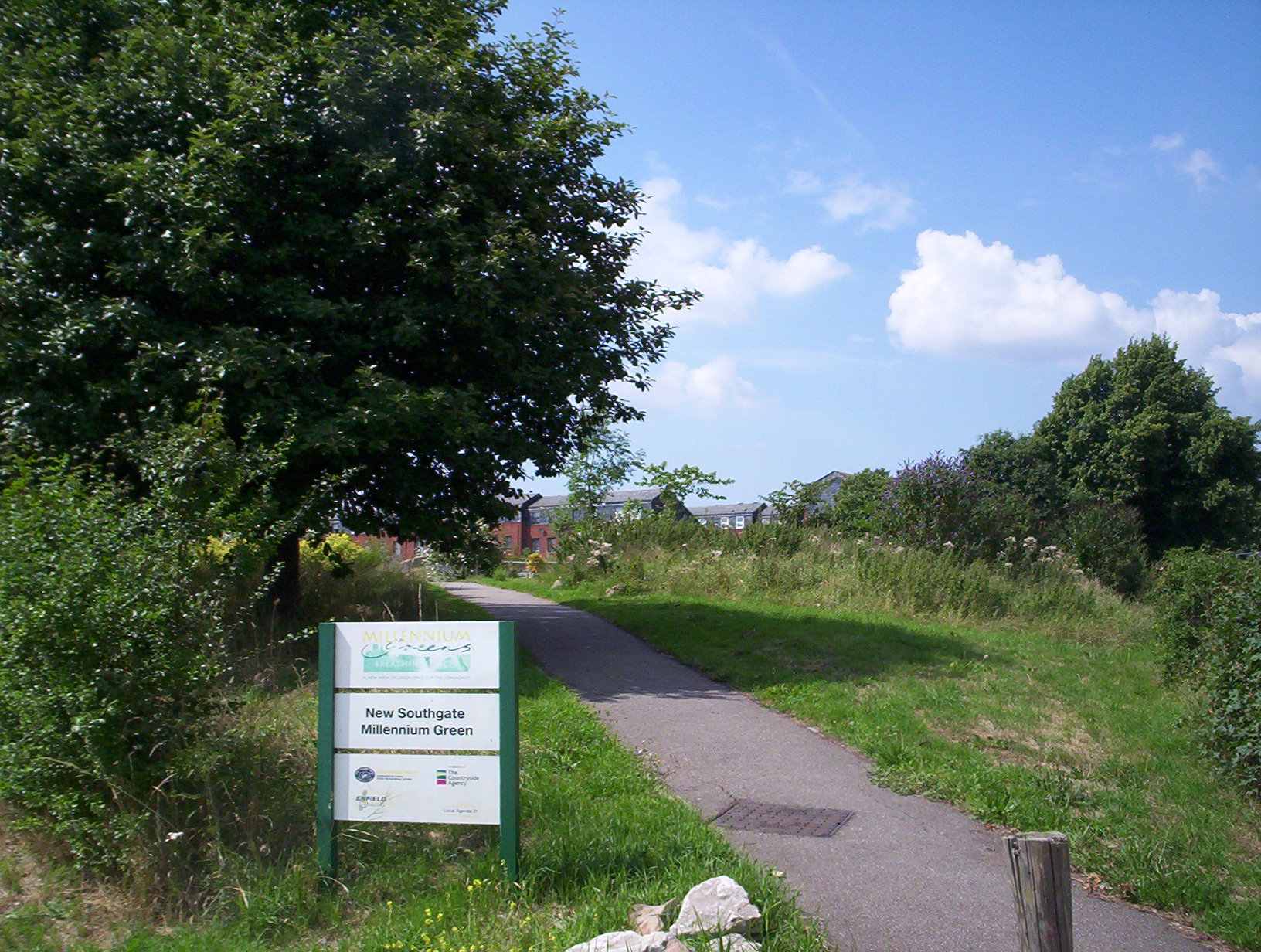
One of 245 Millennium Greens created in England around the turn of the millennium

== Examples of projects funded ==
The Commission invested over £2 billion in buildings, environmental projects, celebrations and community schemes. Funded projects include:

- Black Country Urban Forest
- Centre for Life, Newcastle upon Tyne
- Dundee Science Centre
- Eden Project, Cornwall
- Falkirk Wheel
- Glasgow Science Centre
- The Big Idea, North Ayrshire
- Winchester Science Centre (formerly INTECH)
- Five Millennium piers for London River Services
- Magna Science Adventure Centre, Rotherham
- Millennium Bridge, London
- Millennium Dome, London
- Ceramica, a museum in Burslem, Stoke-on-Trent about the area's pottery industry (closed in 2011)
- The Millennium Forest for Scotland
- Millennium Greens in cities, towns and villages
- Millennium Point, Birmingham
- Millennium Seed Bank, West Sussex
- Millennium Stadium, Cardiff
- National Centre for Popular Music, Sheffield (closed in 2000)
- National Space Centre, Leicester
- Odyssey Centre, Belfast
- Dynamic Earth, Edinburgh
- ReDiscover, Newcastle upon Tyne (joint venture with the Wellcome Trust and the Wolfson Foundation)
- Spinnaker Tower, Portsmouth
- Sheffield Winter Garden
- The Deep, Hull, an aquarium
- Wales Millennium Centre, Cardiff
- A number of village halls and community meeting places

== Commissioners ==
There were initially nine commissioners – two ministers, one appointed by the opposition, and six independents. The number of commissioners was reduced to five as the work of the commission decreased. The final members were:

- Richard Caborn (Chair), Minister for Sport
- Floella Benjamin, actress and author
- Heather Couper, broadcaster and writer on space
- Judith Donovan, health and safety commissioner
- Michael Heseltine, former Conservative cabinet minister

=== Previous commissioners ===
- Virginia Bottomley
- Lord Brooke of Sutton Mandeville
- Lord Clark of Windermere
- Jack Cunningham
- Matthew d'Ancona
- Richard Scott, Earl of Dalkeith
- Stephen Dorrell
- Sir John Hall
- Robin Dixon, 3rd Baron Glentoran
- Sir Simon Jenkins
- Tessa Jowell
- Lord Montague of Oxford
- Mo Mowlam
- Barbara Roche
- Baroness Scotland of Asthal
- Baron Smith of Finsbury
