= Millennium Green =

Areas of green space in England

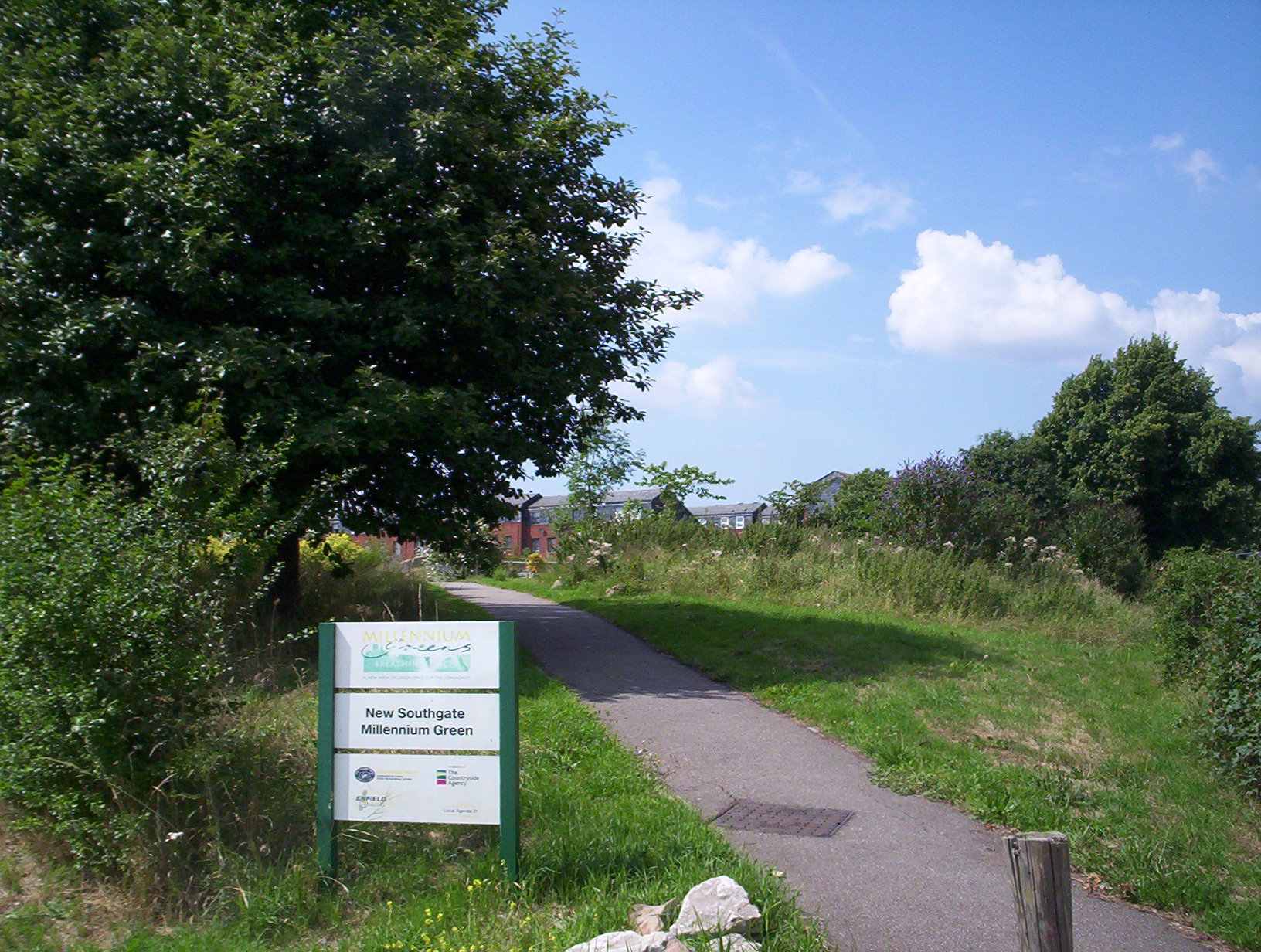
The Entrance to New Southgate Millennium Green, London

Millennium Greens are areas of green space for the benefit of local communities in England. 245 were created in cities, towns and villages to celebrate the turn of the millennium. Their creation was funded in part by the National Lottery via the Countryside Agency. Each one is different, as local people have had an input into the design of their green.

The project to create 250 Millennium Greens started in 1996 and ended when the last green was handed over to its own local charitable trust in perpetuity. Each trust now fundraises for and runs its own green, within the bounds of its trust deed, for the benefit of its local community.

== Aims ==
The aims of Millennium Greens, as stated in their trust deeds, are as follows:

- Make a substantial contribution to the life of the whole community
- Be able to be enjoyed by people of all ages and physical abilities
- Be open and evident to visitors to the locality as well as inhabitants
- Be an attractive place for people to take air and exercise, meet others and pursue leisure activities and pastimes consistent with the shared enjoyment of the whole of the land
- Include an area suitable for community events and celebrations
- Include significant "natural" areas, where people can enjoy nature and wildlife at first hand
- Make a positive contribution to the local environment and respect the established character of the area
- Remain safely and conveniently accessible from inhabitants' homes

== History ==
The project took its inspiration from the Pocket Park project, launched in 1984, which started the idea of communities being directly involved in the creation and maintenance of new parks. The Millennium Greens scheme was one of many UK projects funded by the Millennium Commission using National Lottery money. It was intended to form part of the permanent legacy of the turn of the millennium celebrations.

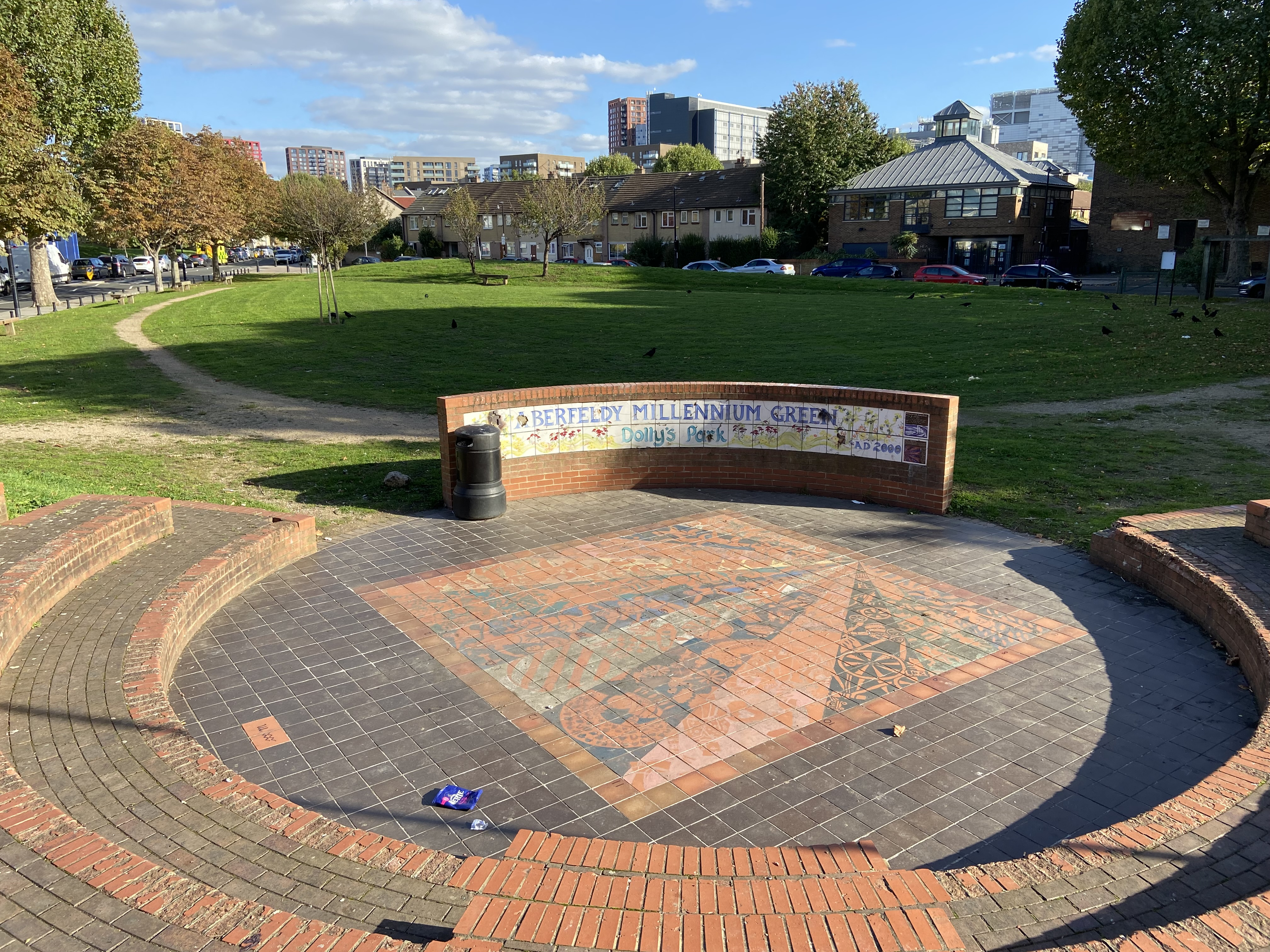
The Aberfeldy MM Green Amphitheatre in 2022

== Design of the greens ==
The general blueprint for the design and creation of Millennium Greens specified both green, natural areas and an area suitable for public events. The Trust Deeds also specified that no buildings were to be built on the land and not more than 10% of the land should be hard areas, such as paving or car parks.

Another requirement of the original sponsors was that they would not provide formal sporting grounds and play equipment, so no pitches or playground apparatus were to be built with their funds.

Every Millennium Green was to have a feature: some kind of sculpture or other creation which could act as a focus for the green's creation and opening. Various green projects chose something inspired by the history or geography of their locality, such as a statue, water feature or sun-dial. Many of these were unveiled at an official opening ceremony for the green.

== Creation ==
The Countryside Agency (CA) administered the creation of the greens, with regional officers studying grant applications and plans, then surveying land and discussing details with local would-be trustees. The CA's team suffered from many of their operatives being on short-term contracts to do this work, encouraging them to look for new work elsewhere, then leave before the end of the project.

== Wildlife ==
Having a wildlife area is a part of the aims of creating and running a Millennium Green and most of the greens' trusts maintain an interest in the wildlife of their greens. Most websites relating to each green have something to say about wildlife and many have photos and lists of species.

== Legacy ==
By the end of the scheme, 245 out of the planned 250 Millennium Greens were created. Whilst some lessons were learnt about creating such schemes, the Countryside Agency considered the project such a success that in 2001 it launched Doorstep Greens to continue creating locally-run public green areas. The CA's successor, Natural England, has evaluated both schemes and identified some weaknesses in the plans for both Pocket Parks and Millennium Greens that have made them difficult to create and maintain in perpetuity. Millennium Greens and Doorstep Greens have won numerous Green Pennant Awards. Royal Mail celebrated the Millennium Green project in its People and Places stamps as part of its Millennium Collection in 2000.

The greens were intended to last in perpetuity and, as such, each was set up with a trust deed including requirements to keep the land and have it available for access by the general public. As charitable trusts, each body's operation is controlled by the Charity Commission. Many Millennium Greens were established with formal links to other charities and official bodies. Their deeds enable them to work with commercial sponsors, and some greens have used sponsorship to further their aims.

Because the trusts are reliant on local volunteers being willing to stand as trustee, some trusts are no longer independent. A number have been changed by Natural England and the Charity Commission, with the local authority usually becoming the green's sole trustee.

Whilst the greens were intended to last in perpetuity, with most of them given a 999-year lease, they are vulnerable to compulsory purchase if the local authority wants to change the use of the land.

== See also ==
- Pocket park
- Millennium wood
