= Holyrood, Edinburgh =

Area of Edinburgh, Scotland

Coordinates: 55°57′06″N 3°10′42″W

Holyrood: Scottish Gaelic: Taigh an Ròid; Scots: Halyruid
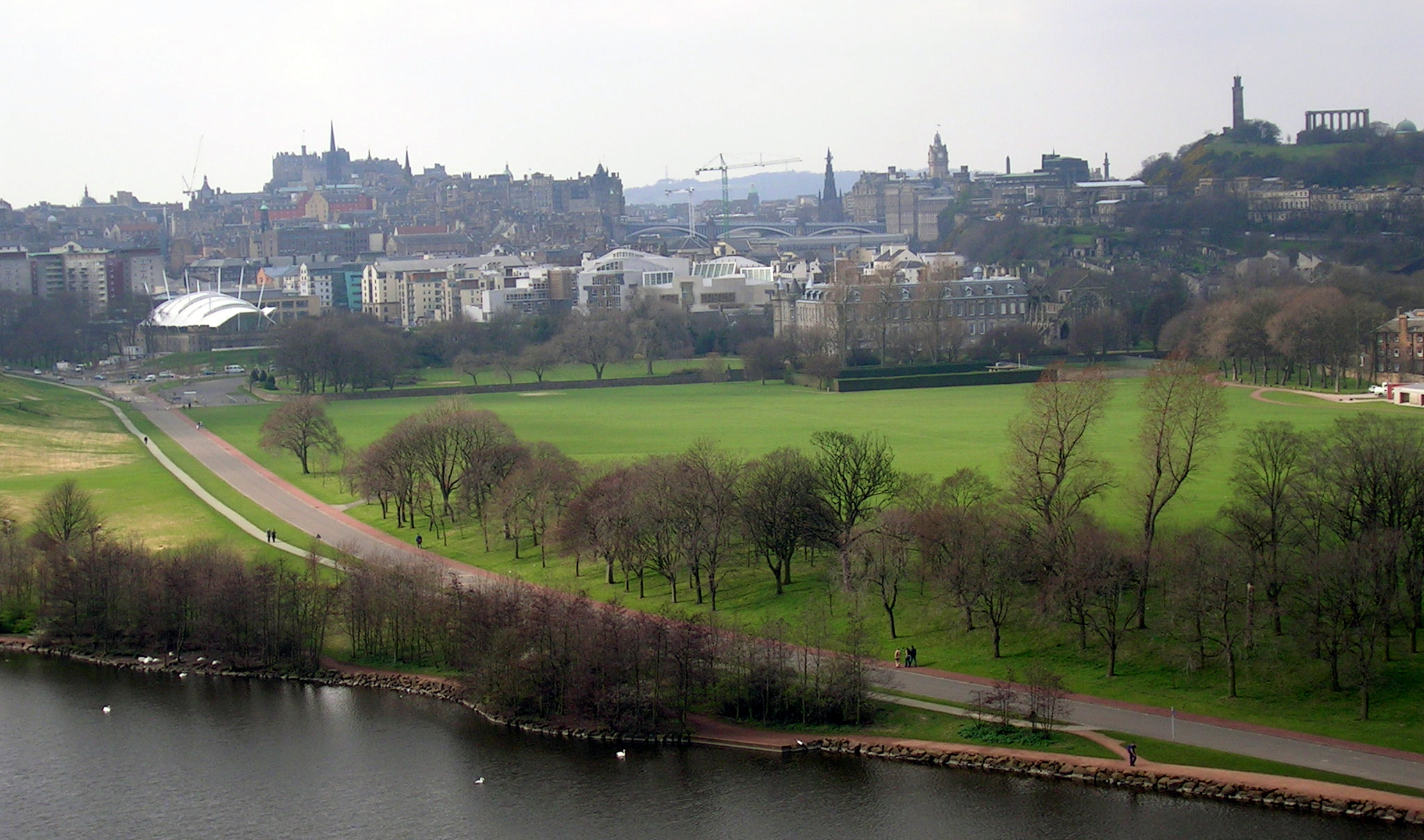
- Taken from Holyrood Park in 2004. From left to right: Dynamic Earth, Edinburgh Castle, Scottish Parliament Building, Palace of Holyroodhouse, Scott Monument, Balmoral Hotel clock tower and Nelson's Monument.

- Location within the City of Edinburgh council area Location within Scotland
- OS grid reference: NT267737
- Council area: City of Edinburgh
- Country: Scotland
- Sovereign state: United Kingdom
- Post town: EDINBURGH
- Postcode district: EH8, EH99
- Dialling code: 0131
- Police: Scotland
- Fire: Scottish
- Ambulance: Scottish
- UK Parliament: Edinburgh East
- Scottish Parliament: Edinburgh Central

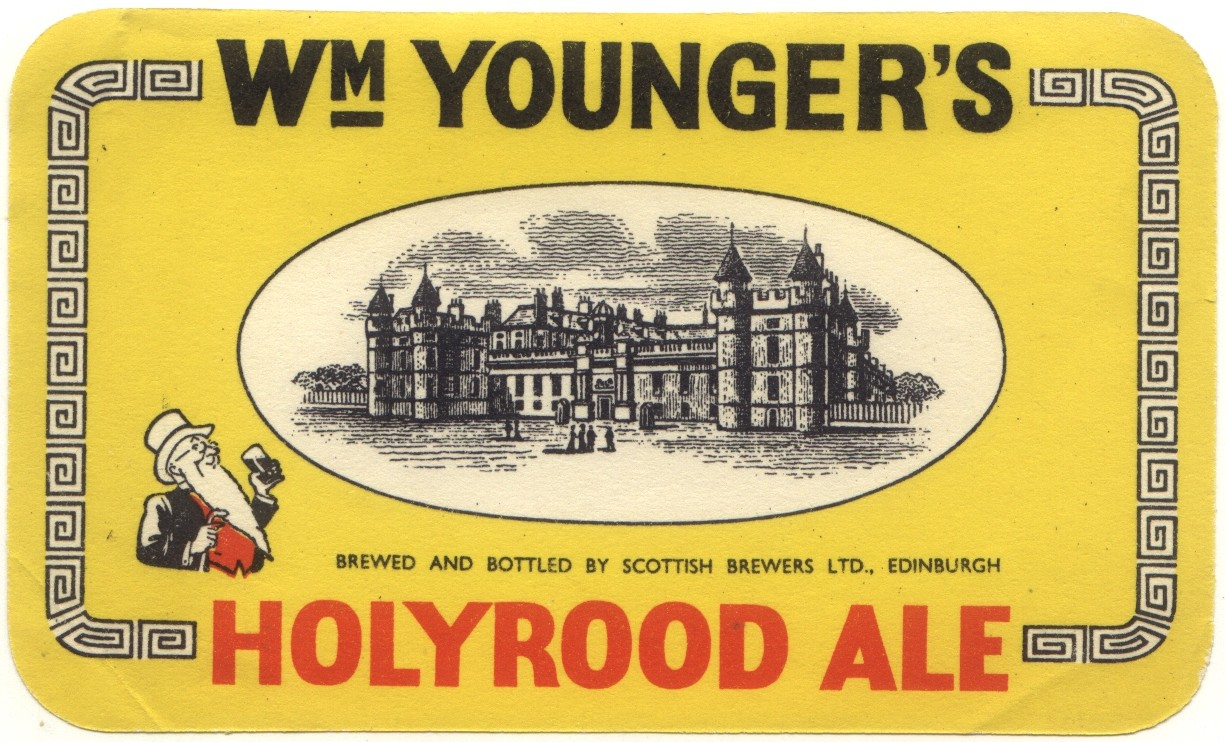
Brewing was the main local industry in the 19th and 20th centuries.

Holyrood (/ˈhɒliruːd/; Scots: Halyruid, Scottish Gaelic: Taigh an Ròid) is an area in Edinburgh, the capital of Scotland, lying east of the city centre, at the foot of the Royal Mile.

The area takes its name from Holyrood Abbey, which was the Church of the Holy Rude (Scots for 'Holy Cross').

Holyrood includes the following sites:

- The modern Scottish Parliament Building. For this reason "Holyrood" is often used in contemporary media as a metonym for the Scottish Government.
- The Palace of Holyroodhouse, the official residence of the monarch in Scotland.
- The ruins of Holyrood Abbey
- Holyrood Park, an expansive royal park to the south and east of the palace.
- The Queen's Gallery, part of the Holyroodhouse complex formerly a church and now an art gallery.
- Dynamic Earth, visitor attraction and science centre which is Scotland's largest interactive museum.
- A number of residential, light commercial, and government properties.
