= Commission for Rural Communities =

United Kingdom public body

The Commission for Rural Communities (CRC) was established as a division of England's Countryside Agency on 1 April 2005, and became a non-departmental public body on 1 October 2006, following the enactment of the Natural Environment and Rural Communities Act 2006. The chairman of the commission was Stuart Burgess.

On 29 June 2010, Defra secretary Caroline Spelman announced the abolition of the Commission as part of the 2010 UK quango reforms. It was formally abolished on 31 March 2013.
