= Dundee Science Centre =

Coordinates: 56.4564°N 2.9752°W

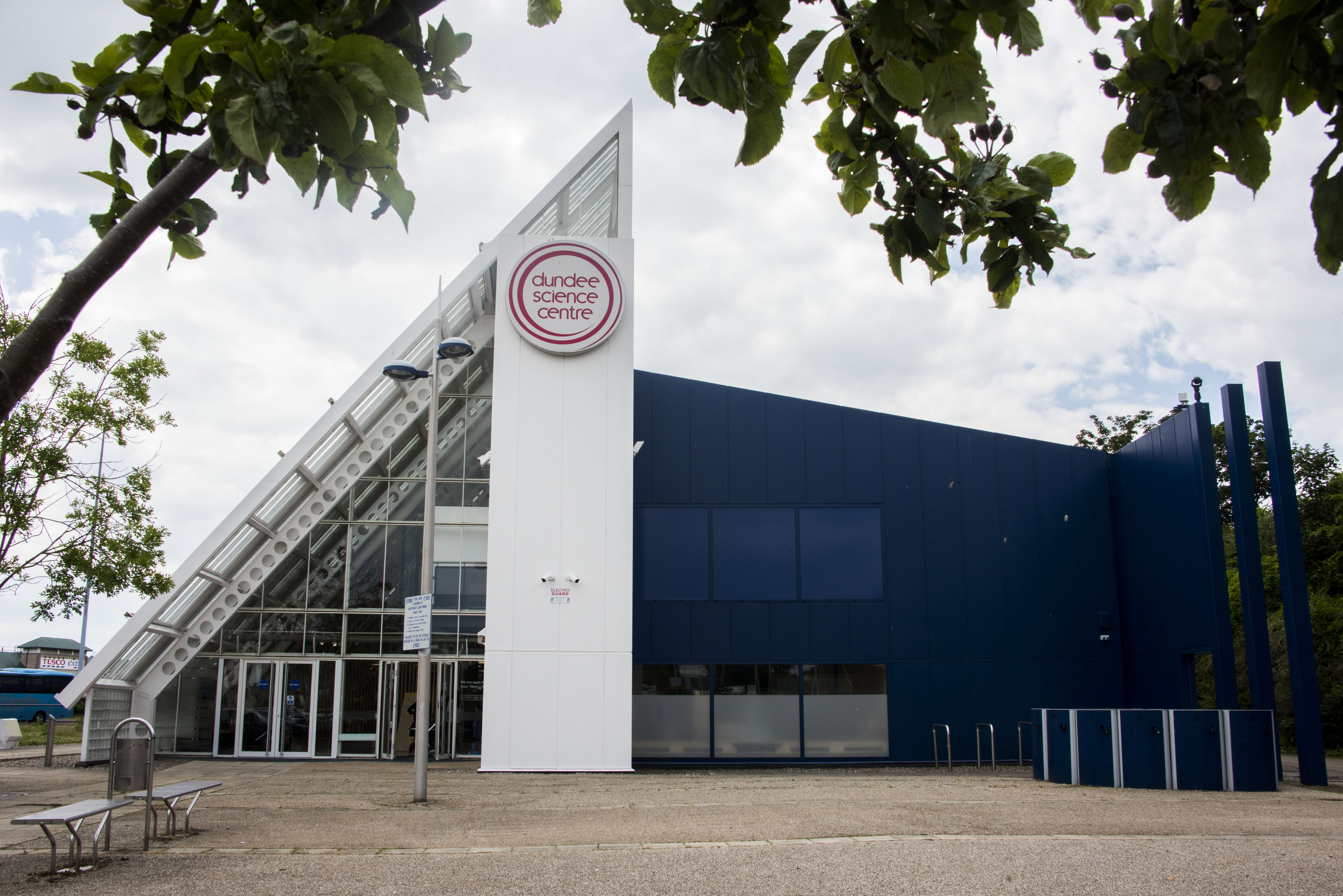
- Former name: Sensation
- Established: July 2000
- Location: Dundee, Scotland
- Type: Science centre and museum
- CEO: Isabel Bruce OBE

Dundee Science Centre (formerly known as Sensation) is a science centre located in Dundee, Scotland, and a part of the Scottish Science Centres Network. It is a registered charity under Scottish law. It is funded by the public and donations from local corporate sponsors.

The interactive exhibits focus mainly on the life sciences, and in particular on the senses. There is also a focus on robotics, and a practical exploration of science learning.

Dundee Science Centre is also a corporate venue and a HMIE-inspected resource for science learning and public engagement.

There is an in-house cafe (Cafe Creative) and a gift shop, stocking many science and educational products.

The centre went under a £2.1m renovation during the coronavirus pandemic. The centre reopened in 2021 with the aim to make it more accessible.

== History ==
As one of the Millennium Commission projects, it opened in July 2000 at the cost of around £5 million.

In 2013, the museum changed its name from Sensation to Dundee Science Centre.

In 2020, Dundee Science Centre closed for a large period of the year as well as the first half of 2021 due to the COVID-19 pandemic. During this time the centre's ground floor underwent a £2 million renovation to make the area more accessible to assisted needs visitors. The centre reopened in June 2021 with additional COVID guidelines in place such as mask wearing and hand washing.

== See also ==
- Our Dynamic Earth - Science Centre in Edinburgh, Scotland
- Glasgow Science Centre - Science Centre in Glasgow, Scotland
- Aberdeen Science Centre - Science Centre in Aberdeen, Scotland
- List of science centers#Europe
