= Pocket park =

Small park accessible to the public

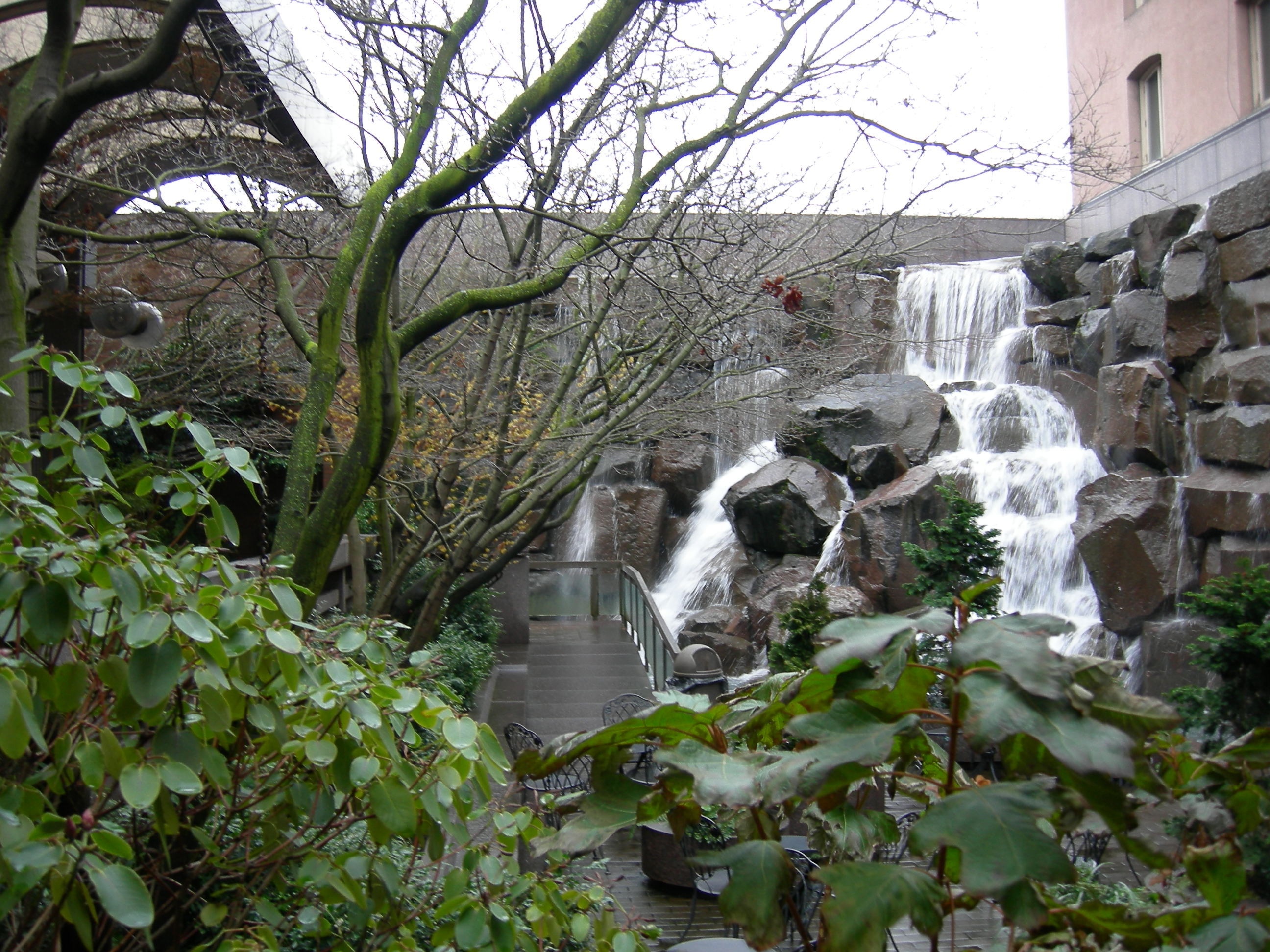
Waterfall Garden Park, Pioneer Square, Seattle, Washington

A pocket park (also known as a parkette, mini-park, vest-pocket park or vesty park) is a small park accessible to the general public. While the locations, elements, and uses of pocket parks vary considerably, the common defining characteristic of a pocket park is its small size. Typically, a pocket park occupies one to three municipal lots and is smaller than 0.5 hectares (1 acre) in size.

Pocket parks can be urban, suburban or rural, but they customarily appear in densely urbanized areas, where land is very expensive and space for the development of larger urban parks is limited. They are frequently created on small, irregular pieces of public or private land, such as in vacant building lots, in brownfields, beside railways, beneath utility lines, or in parking spots.

Pocket parks can create new public spaces without the need for large-scale redevelopment. In inner-city areas, pocket parks are often part of urban regeneration efforts by transforming underutilized or blighted spaces into vibrant community assets. They may also be created as a component of the public space requirement of large building projects.

Pocket parks can serve as focal points of activity and interest in urban areas. Common elements of pocket parks include benches, tables, fountains, playgrounds, monuments, historic markers, art installations, barbecue pits, flower beds, community gardens, or basketball courts. Although they are often too small for many space-intensive physical activities, pocket parks provide communities with greenery, a place to sit and rest, and an ecological foothold for urban wildlife.

== History ==
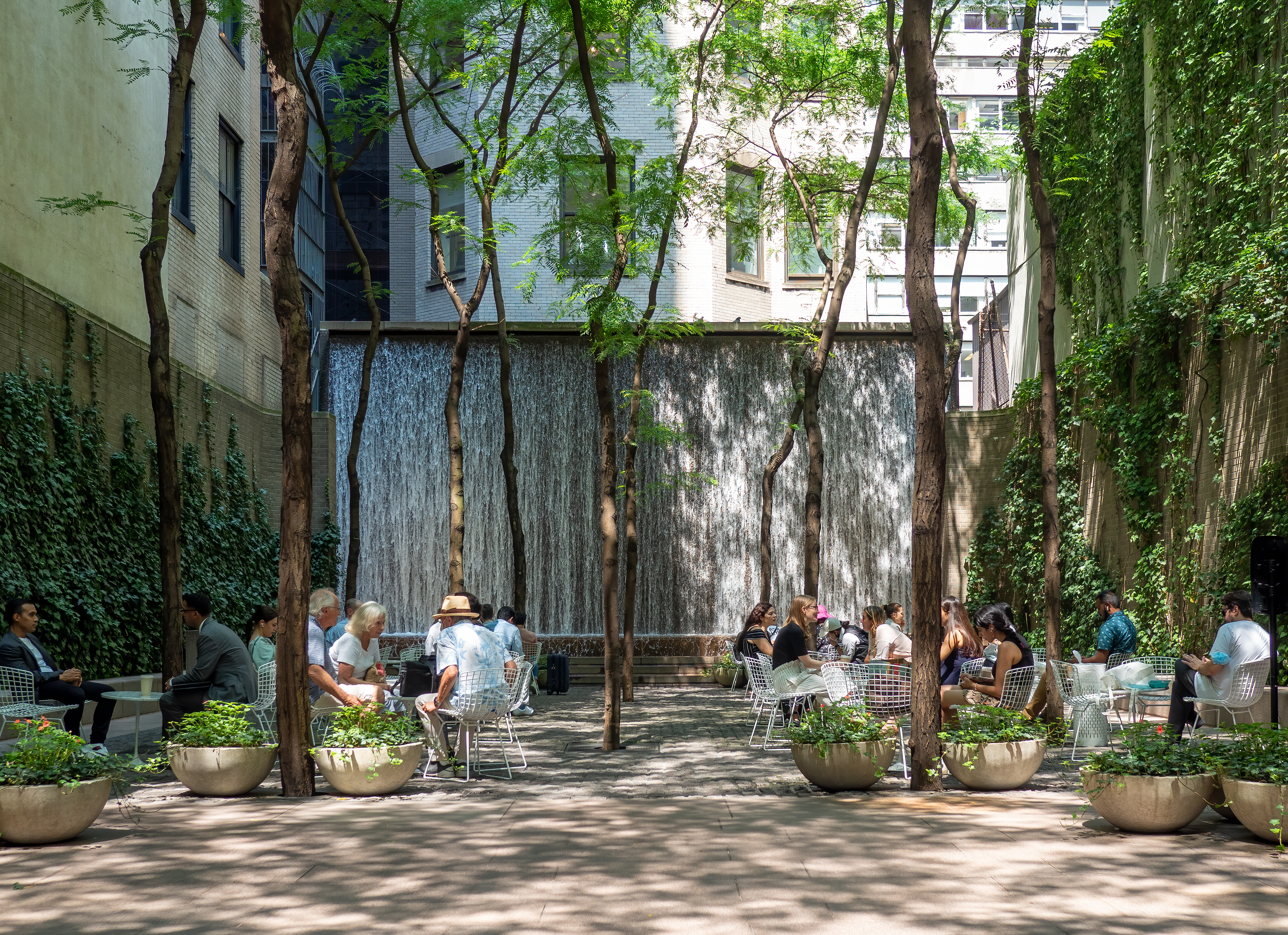
Paley Park in Midtown Manhattan, New York City, opened in 1967 as one of the earliest pocket parks and privately owned public spaces in the United States.

The first pocket parks appeared in Europe in the aftermath of World War II. As cities began to recover from the large-scale physical damage incurred by warfare, such as from bombings, limitations in capital, labor, and building materials necessitated cheap, easy, and minimalistic solutions to restore urban landscapes. These constraints promoted the conversion of heavily damaged sites into small public parks which echoed the neighborhood's original peacetime identity.

By the 1950s, the first pocket parks appeared in the United States as an adaptation of these small European parks. Inspired by this readaptation of urban space, landscape architect and professor Karl Linn proposed the transformation of vacant lots in Baltimore, Philadelphia, and Washington D.C. into neighborhood commons. These small urban spaces served as low-cost interventions to improve the quantity and quality of community gathering spaces and recreational facilities in dense urban areas.

In 1964, Whitney North Seymour Jr. advocated for the creation of pocket parks in New York City during his tenure as president of the Park Association of New York. Congressman John Lindsay endorsed the creation of pocket parks in his 1965 campaign for New York City mayor, and Paley Park, a premier privately owned public space and prominent example of a pocket park, opened during his mayoralty in 1967.

One of the first municipal programs to fund and structure the creation of pocket parks in the United States occurred in Philadelphia. In 1967, a $320,000 urban beautification campaign encouraged community groups to identify and nominate disused parcels for development into pocket parks. Upon approval, the city provided technical knowledge and financial support to residents, who would collaborate with city officials to design, construct, and maintain the new parks. From their onset, these pocket parks were well received by municipal workers and residents. To this day, the City of Philadelphia manages over 150 neighborhood parks. Baltimore features a pocket park, Robert Baker Park, commemorating widely recognized horticulturist and botanist Robert Lewis Baker. It is located almost adjacent to its large and historic Federal Hill Park.

== Development and design ==
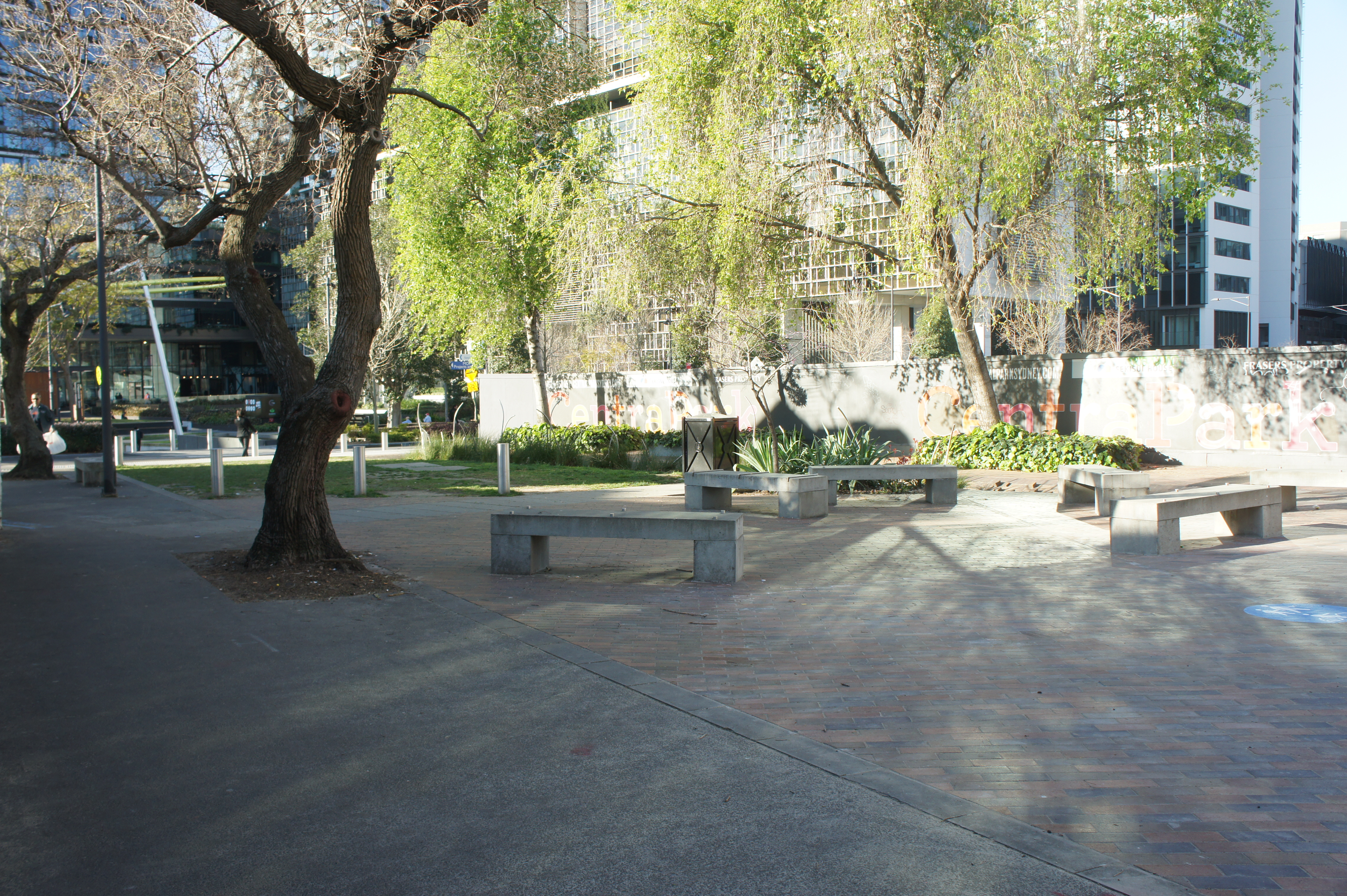
Pocket parks, such as the Balfour Street Park in Sydney, Australia, can be created from small unused areas of public land.

Pocket parks typically develop on small, solitary, irregularly shaped, and physically damaged lots. Because these parcels may not be conducive to commercial development, the land on which they are situated is often relatively cheap to acquire, and transforming the neglected parcel into public or green space may be the only viable opportunity for redevelopment. Thus, the placement and creation of pocket parks tends to be an opportunistic product of environmental circumstance rather than through deliberate master planning.

Due to their small size, pocket parks typically serve a hyperlocal population, and the limited opportunities for park form and function are closely tied to these local community needs. For example, a pocket park in a business district may prioritize tables and seating for employees to take a lunch break, while a pocket park in a residential area may prioritize a structure for children to play on.

Consequently, the development of pocket parks generally entails extensive public participation and collaboration between community members, landscape architects, municipal officials, and local institutions such as businesses or schools. Through this community organization, the development of pocket parks promotes grassroots planning and strengthens relationships between residents and local authorities.

== Community impact ==
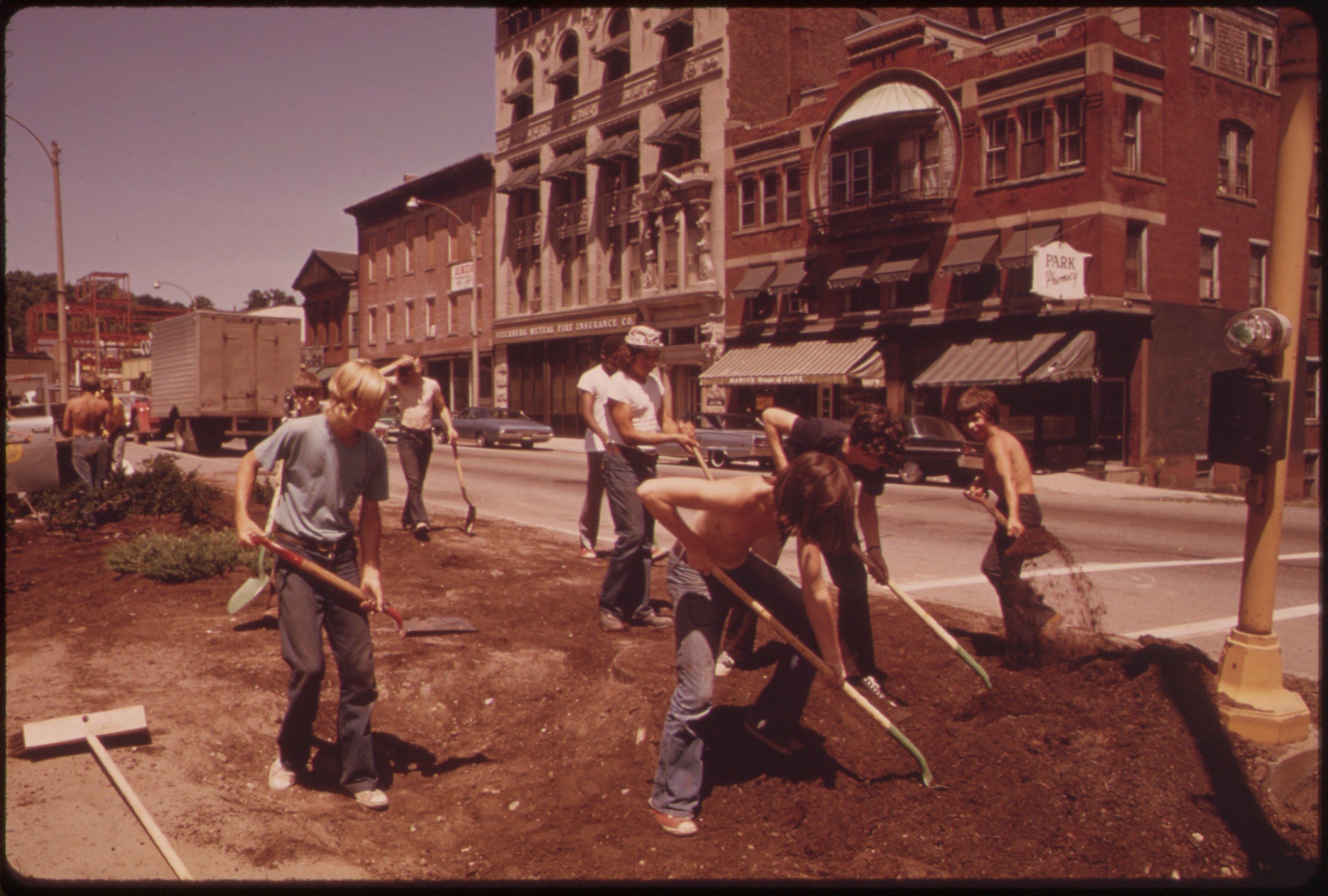
A contingent from the Youth Opportunities Corps builds a pocket park on a main street in Fitchburg, Massachusetts in July 1973. The creation of pocket parks can promote civic engagement and a unified sense of community identity.

Despite their small footprint, pocket parks can dramatically enhance the quality of life of their surrounding communities.

Pocket parks prevent overdevelopment in dense neighborhoods and vary the form of the built environment with islands of shade, quiet, and privacy, which may otherwise be difficult to find in urban areas. Well-maintained pocket parks can deter visual signs of urban neglect by discouraging the vandalism which occurs in otherwise abandoned lots. The beautification efforts of pocket parks can increase a neighborhood's aesthetic appeal and shape a distinct, positive visual identity for a city as a whole.

The creation of pocket parks encourages public participation and residential collaboration towards a meaningful long-term improvement to the community. In turn, this community participation can foster community pride and empower residents to tackle additional neighborhood improvement projects.

Unlike a singular large scale urban park, numerous pocket parks can be distributed throughout a single neighborhood, and multiple pocket parks can be spaced close together. This distribution increases the usefulness and accessibility of green urban spaces by decreasing the distance and time between parks and their users, especially for users who have difficulty travelling long distances, such as children, the elderly, or individuals with mobility impairments. This close proximity can also generate strong personal attachments and positive associations of place identity, especially among children who grow up in neighborhoods containing pocket parks.

These positive impacts are magnified in neighborhoods with low-income or racial minority populations, where green space may be scarce and the new development of larger-scale parks may be infeasible due to spatial or financial constraints. These benefits also particularly improve the quality of urban life for women, who are more likely to use pocket parks than men.

=== Economic impact ===
One study conducted in Greenville, South Carolina, found that "attractively maintained small and medium parks have a positive influence on neighboring property values." Despite this potential to inflate local housing costs, pocket parks are less likely to contribute to environmental gentrification than larger urban parks.

=== Ecological impact ===
Patches of green landscaping and permeable surfaces within pocket parks can mitigate the urban heat island effect, aid in stormwater management, and help control microclimates. This greenery can also attract and harbor urban wildlife, especially birds. However, pocket parks are typically designed for human use and therefore may only provide limited ecological benefits to non-human species.

The establishment of local pocket parks can reduce the stress upon larger urban parks, such as by eliminating overcrowding. The use of local pocket parks instead of more distant large urban parks reduces the traffic, pollution, and energy consumption associated with automobile travel and can allow larger parks to dedicate more space to uses beyond what a pocket park can offer, such as for large-scale natural habitats.

=== Public health and safety impact ===
Pocket parks can deter the accumulation of unsanitary and potentially biohazardous waste, promoting positive externalities on public health.

A study in Los Angeles concluded that pocket parks were more effective than larger existing parks and playgrounds at promoting moderate to vigorous physical activity in low-income neighborhoods. This is likely due to increased pedestrianism, for the short distance between user's homes and pocket parks encourages users to walk to access outdoor public spaces.

The creation of pocket parks can improve resident perceptions of public safety. One study from the University of Pennsylvania concluded that converting vacant lots into pocket parks reduces crime rates. In Los Angeles, where there are restrictions on how close registered sex offenders can live to parks, local officials planned three pocket parks to drive "undesirables" from a given area.

== Around the world ==
=== Chile ===
In Santiago, Chile, the first pocket park (plaza de bolsillo) was created beside of Palacio La Moneda at Morandé Street. It was an initiative of Architecture Department of the Ministry of Public Infrastructure and Regional Government of Santiago.

=== Mexico ===
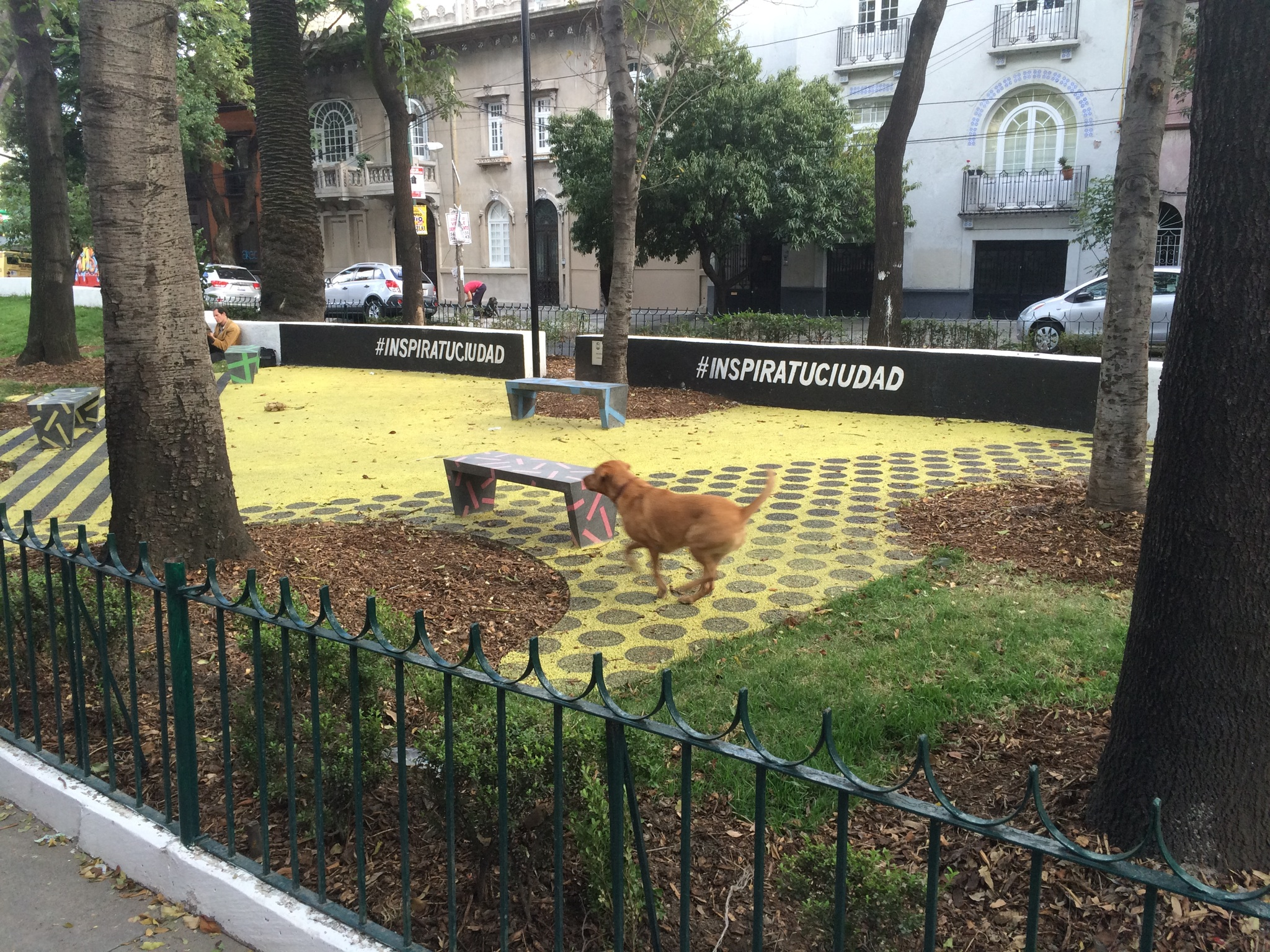
A dog plays in Jardín Edith Sánchez Ramírez pocket park in Mexico City's Colonia Roma neighborhood

In Mexico City, there is a city program to facilitate the creation of up to 150 pocket parks of 400m^{2} or less on vacant lots and former road intersections, such as Jardín Edith Sánchez Ramírez and Condesa pocket park.

=== Poland ===
In Krakow, the Municipal Green Areas Management Board launched a 2018 initiative to improve the quality of public space and the quantity of green space by creating eighteen new pocket parks, which were modeled after the successes of New York City's Paley Park and Philadelphia's John F. Collins Park.

=== United Kingdom ===
In England, a 1984 project to involve the local community in the creation and running of small, local parks has fostered several pocket parks in Northamptonshire, and was later developed by the Countryside Commission into the Millennium Green and Doorstep Green projects.

== Gallery ==
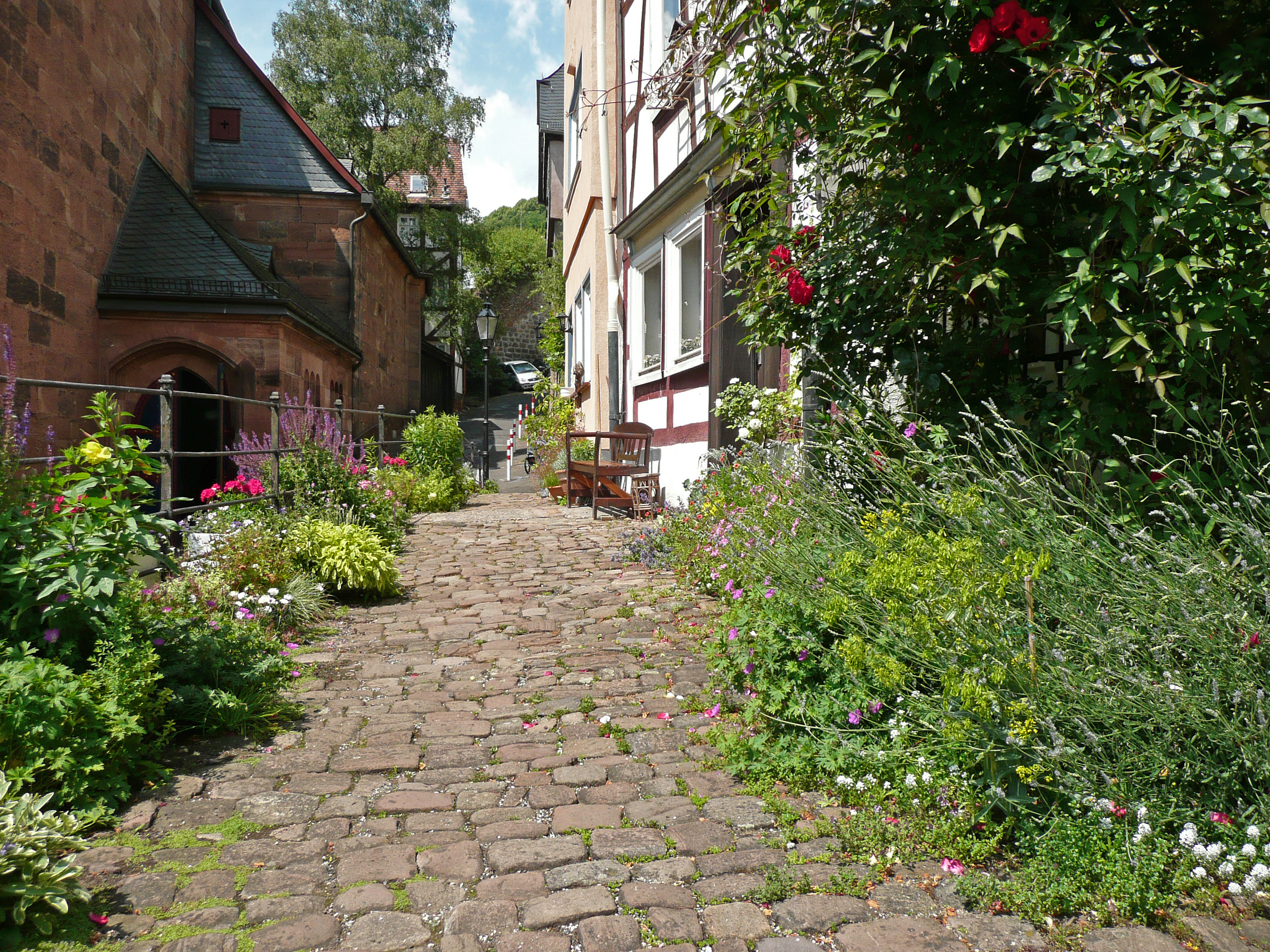
A pocket park in Marburg, Germany features a cobblestone walking path, flower beds, and a sitting area.

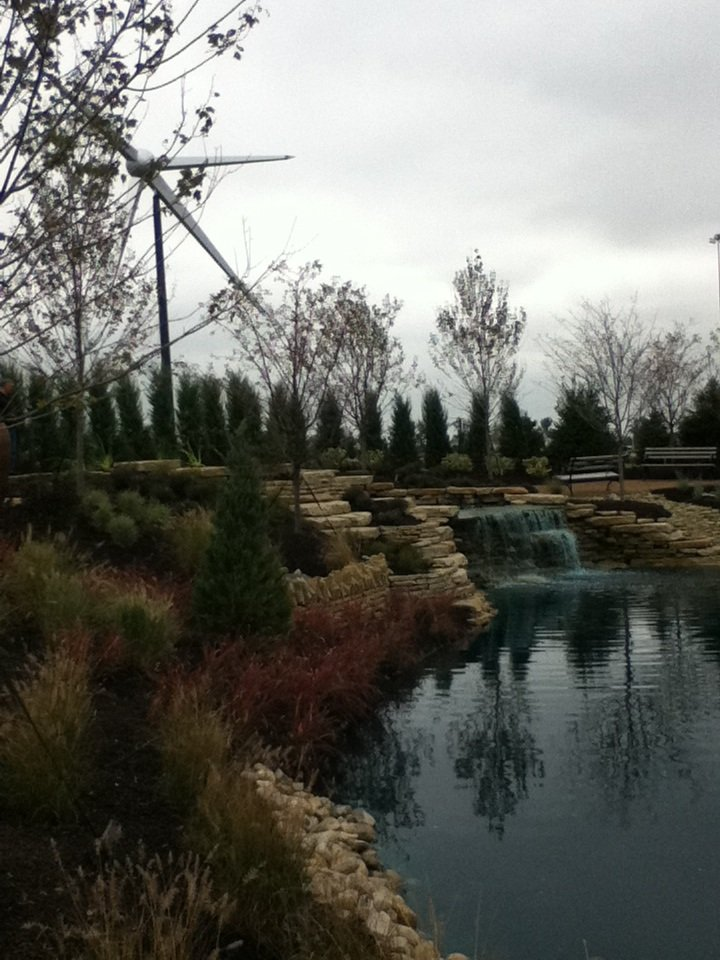
In Columbus, Ohio, Polaris Founder's Park was opened in 2011 and holds a 35-foot wind sculpture.

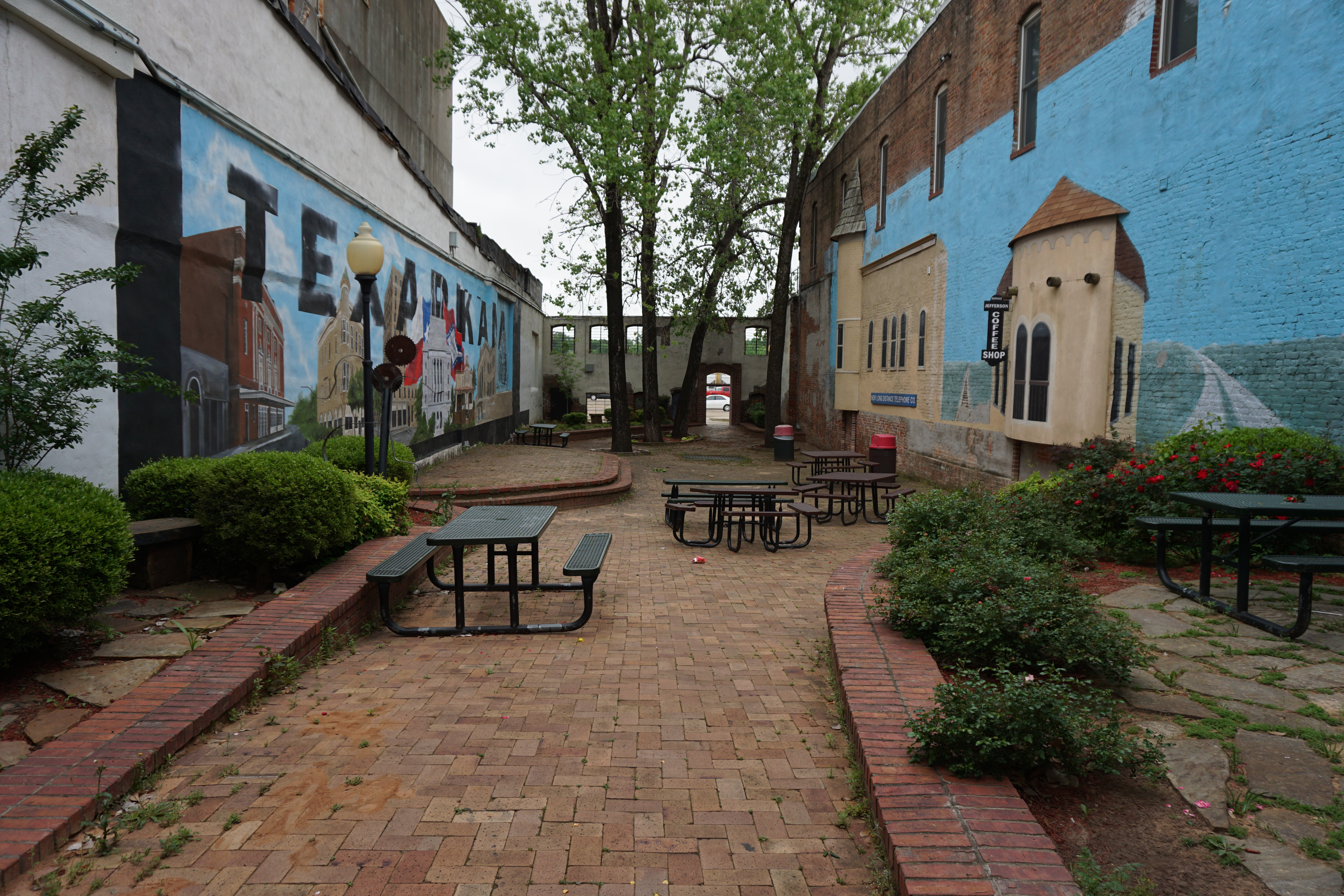
Broad Street Park in Texarkana, Arkansas occupies a single lot between two commercial buildings on a main street.

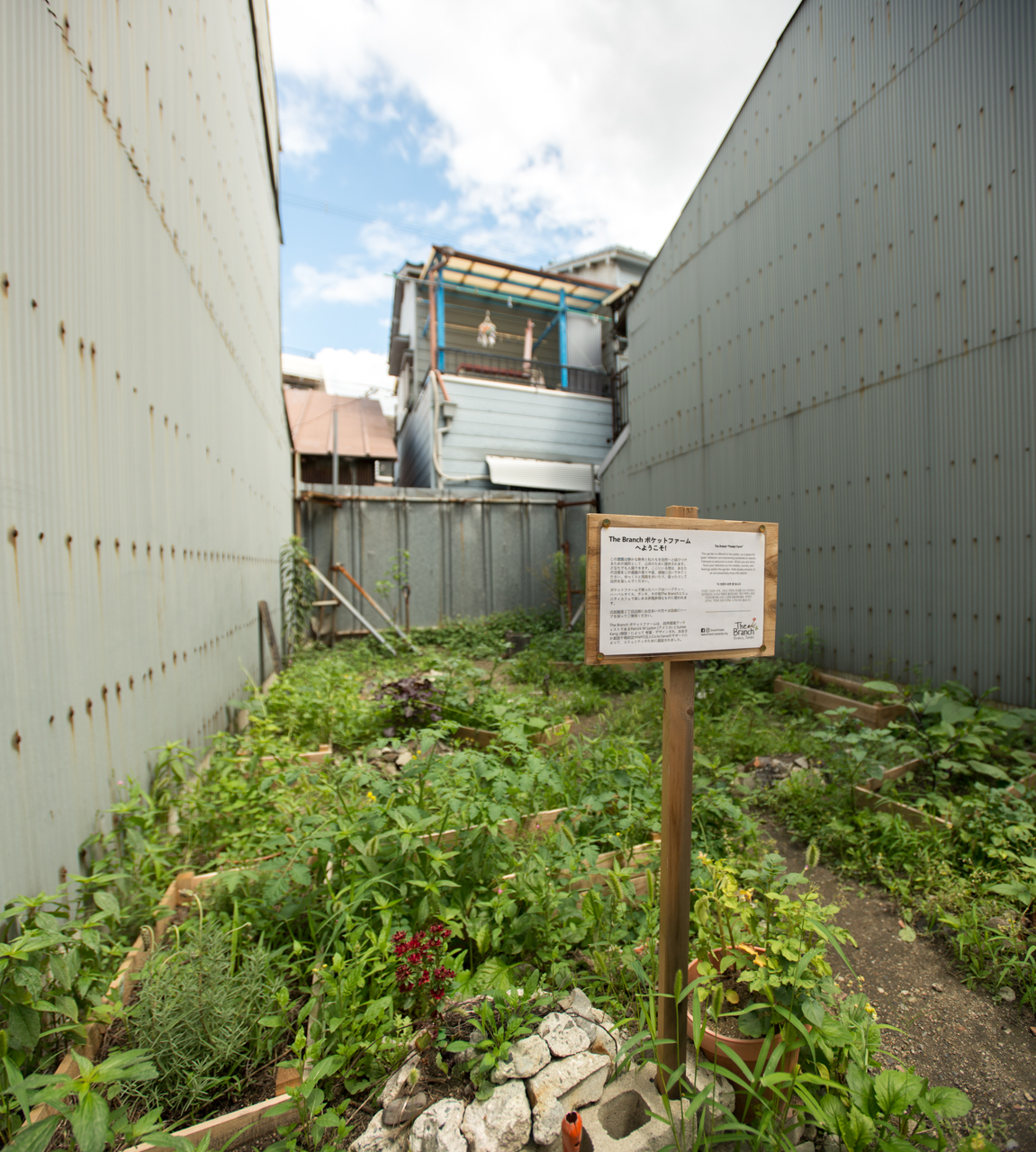
The Branch "Pocket Farm" is a free, open farm in a pocket park managed by local artists and used to host eco art workshops. It is one of a handful of urban gardens in the Kitakagaya Creative Village neighborhood in Suminoe-ku, Osaka, Japan.

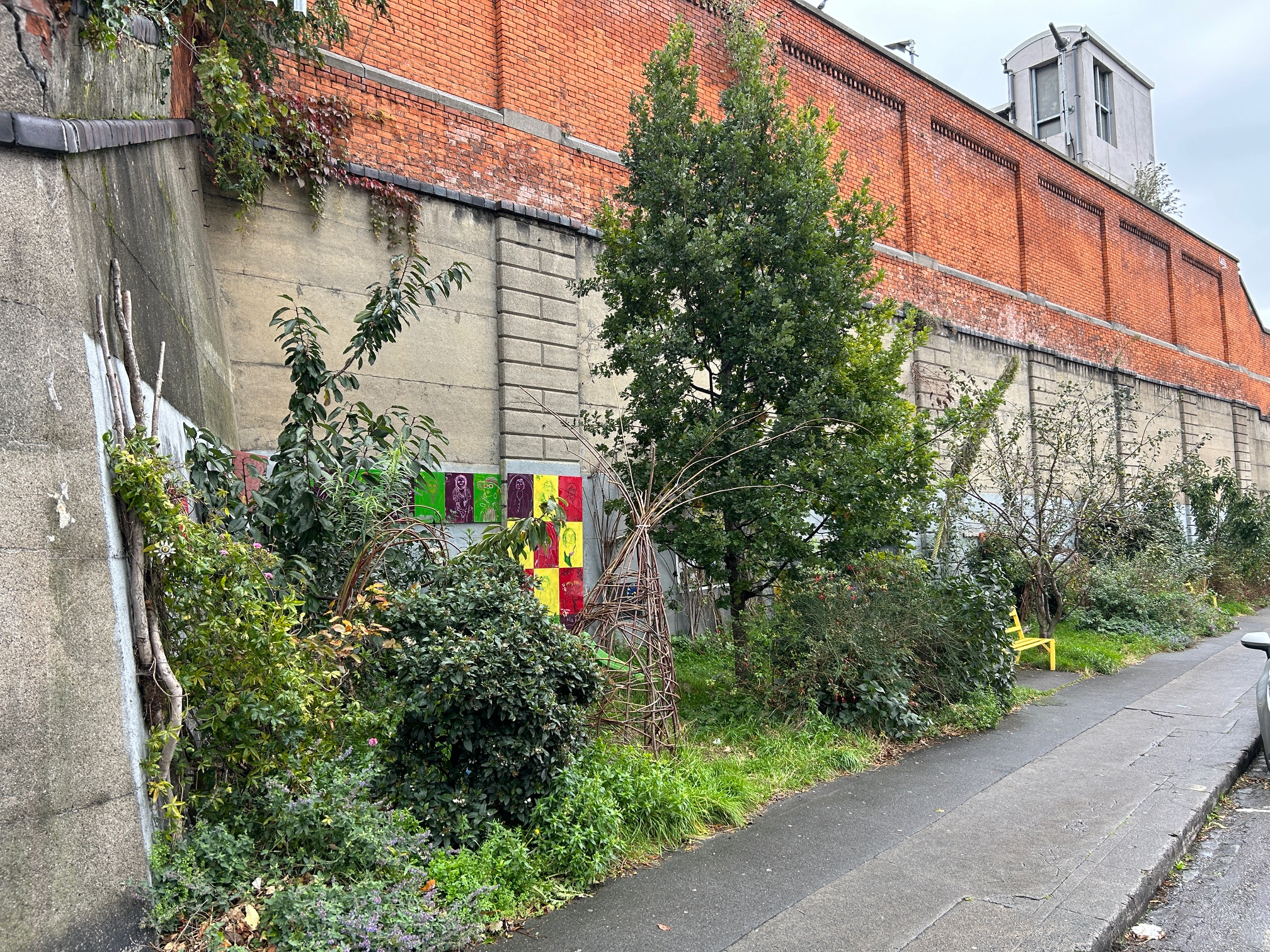
St. Anne's Road Pocket Park in Dublin, Ireland occupies a sliver of land, backed by the high wall of Drumcondra railway station.

== See also ==
- Parklet
- Urban green space
