= Dynamic Earth (Edinburgh) =

Science centre in Edinburgh, Scotland

Coordinates: 55°57′2.08″N 3°10′27.73″W

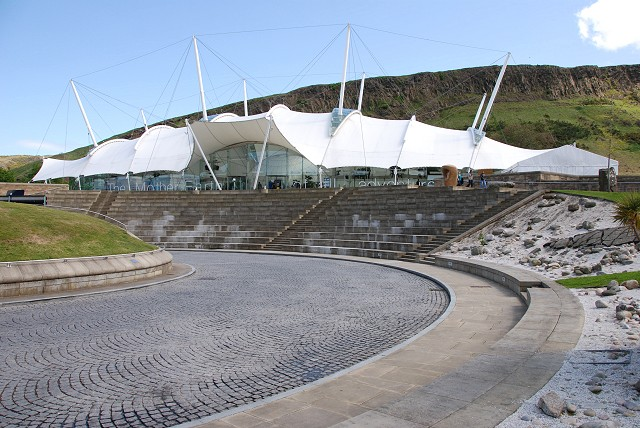
- Former name: Our Dynamic Earth
- Established: 1999
- Location: Edinburgh, Scotland
- Type: Science Centre
- Director: Conor Ellis
- CEO: Gwilym Gibbons
- Architect: Hopkins Architects
- Owner: The Dynamic Earth Charitable Trust
- Website: Dynamic Earth Home

Dynamic Earth (originally known as Our Dynamic Earth) is a not-for-profit visitor attraction and science centre in Edinburgh, and is Scotland's largest interactive visitor attraction. It is located in Holyrood, beside the Scottish Parliament building and at the foot of Salisbury Crags. It is a registered charity under Scottish law and is owned as The Dynamic Earth Charitable Trust. The centre was opened by Queen Elizabeth II in 1999.

The project is located close to where Scottish geologist James Hutton lived and worked in the city in the 18th century. The attraction's aim is to "consistently be the most fun place to play, learn and work... which presents the story of the planet - how it was created; how it continues to evolve, the prospects for mankind and the effect of hazards both natural and manmade."

== History ==
The exhibition was funded by the Millennium Commission in association with The Heritage Lottery Fund and the Scottish Government as part of an urban regeneration project for former industrial land in the Holyrood area. The location was previously on a site which was latterly a gas-works and part of the old Holyrood Brewery. The brewers Scottish & Newcastle donated the site for public use in 1988, although the brewery did not vacate the site until the mid-1990s.

The exhibition cost around £34 million to design and construct (out of a budget of £150 million for the entire area) and was the first major United Kingdom millennium attraction to open. Other exhibitions funded by the Millennium Commission include the Glasgow Science Centre, the Falkirk Wheel and the Millennium Dome in London. The centre was officially opened by Queen Elizabeth II in 1999.

== Design ==
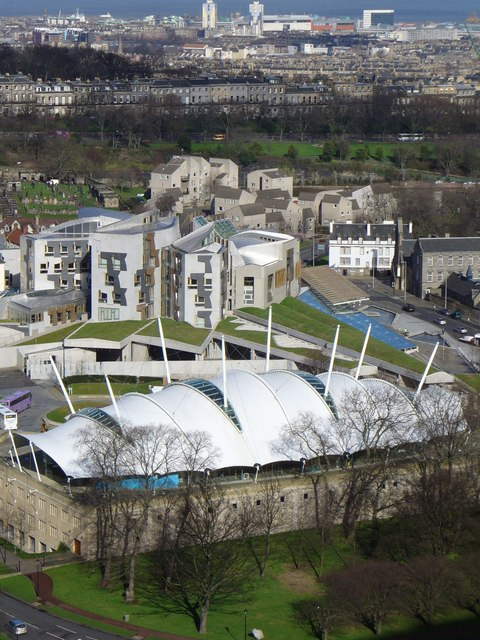
The museum from above, with the new Scottish Parliament Building in the background.

The building's structure consists of a steel mast-supported membrane stretched over a steel skeleton. It was designed by architects Michael Hopkins and Partners. The design incorporates the original wall that formed the outer perimeter of the Abbey Brewery ale stores that were formerly on the site.

The building was intended to show a relationship between nature and artifice and comprises three features:

1. a fabric roof set on a terrace, housing a two-storey exhibition space and the entrance forecourt
2. a large entrance area, designed to have the feel of an outdoor area whilst being completely enclosed
3. an amphitheatre at the front of the attraction, which is used for outdoor events and gathering points for tours of the facility.

== Features ==
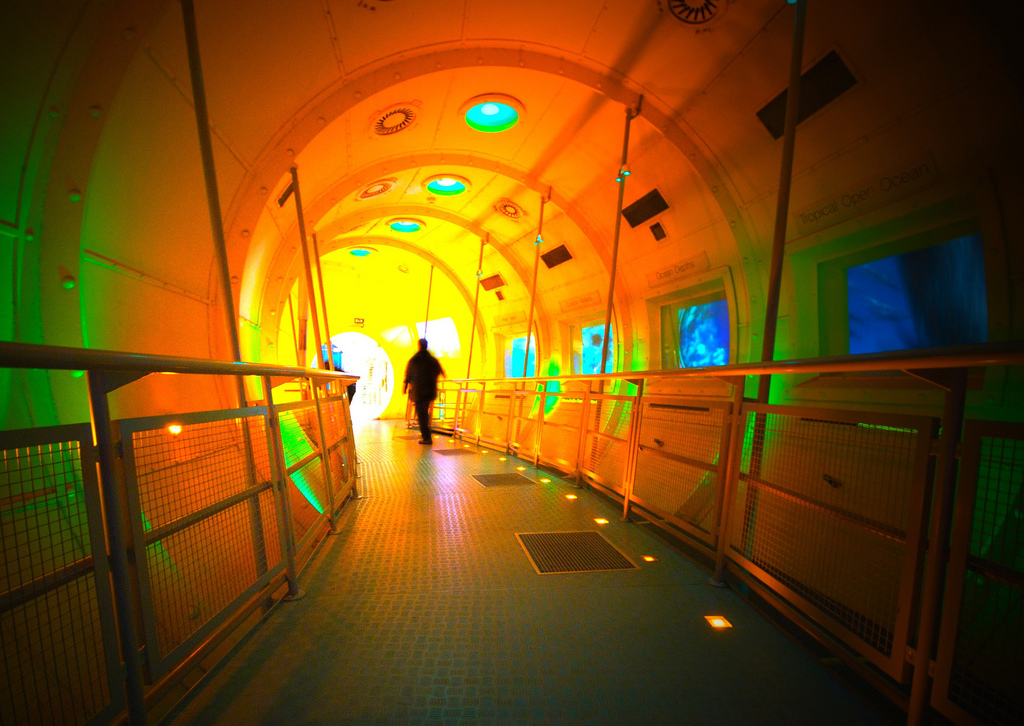
Undersea Tunnel at Dynamic Earth

The facility is designed as an immersive experience with a high level of interactivity. Permanent features of the museum include an iceberg, an earthquake experience and the Deep Time Machine which allows visitors to travel through the creation of the Earth through multimedia and 4D techniques.

The venue also is home to a digital 360° Planetarium. In an interview with the Press & Journal, former chief executive of Dynamic Earth John Simpson, said: “The new equipment will offer visitors an amazing experience within our ShowDome and will inspire even more children and families about Earth and space sciences with an in-house planetarium and a mobile planetarium to reach families all over Scotland.”

== Reception ==
Dynamic Earth was determined by VisitScotland (formerly the Scottish Tourist Board) to be a 5 star world-class visitor attraction.

The building itself has also won a 2001 RIBA Regional Award from the Royal Institute of British Architects and a Civic Trust Award in 2000.

=== Visitor Numbers ===
As with many other Science Centers and Exhibitions constructed around the time including the Millennium Experience in London and The Big Idea in Irvine, initial visitor numbers proved to be overly-optimistic. The Millennium Experience in London received roughly half of their expected visitors and was deemed a failure, whilst The Big Idea closed after only three years in operation after failing to cover operating costs. In 2007, Dynamic Earth stated that, since opening, the attraction has received over 3 million visitors. In the year 2006 it received 202,500 visitors, of which 46,500 were visits by school parties. In order to increase revenue, Dynamic Earth developed three new income sources to complement their visitor attraction in the mid-2000s. These included providing corporate hospitality, hosting meetings and events (including weddings) and educational experiences to allow school trips and group visits from around the country.

== See also ==
- Glasgow Science Centre - Science Centre in Glasgow, Scotland
- Aberdeen Science Centre - Science Centre in Aberdeen, Scotland
- Dundee Science Centre - Science Centre in Dundee, Scotland
- Millennium Dome - Exhibition Centre in London, England
- The Big Idea - Science Centre in Irvine, North Ayrshire
- Millennium Commission - United Kingdom public body
- List of science centers#Europe
