= Aberdeen Science Centre =

Science museum in Scotland

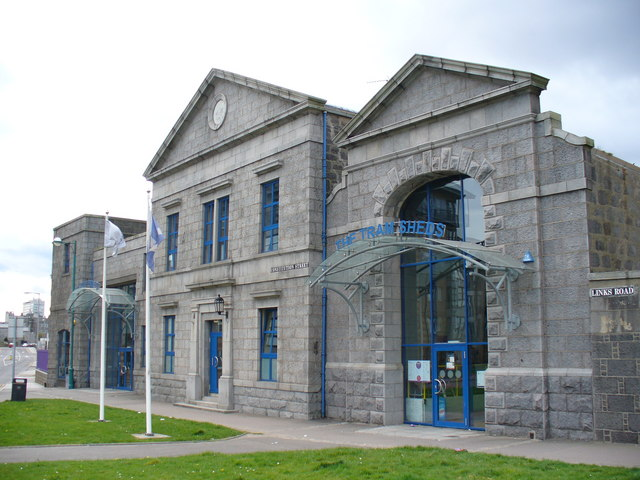
- The exterior of the Centre
- Established: 15 February 1990; 36 years ago
- Location: Aberdeen, Scotland
- Coordinates: 57.1532°N 2.0847°W
- Type: Science museum
- Website: aberdeensciencecentre.org

Listed Building – Category B
- Official name: 'Satrosphere', 179 Constitution Street, Former Tramway Depot
- Designated: 8 July 2003
- Reference no.: LB49309

Aberdeen Science Centre (formerly Satrosphere) is a science museum in Aberdeen, Scotland. It presents interactive science exhibits, shows, and workshops aimed at a broad audience, including school groups. The centre places an emphasis on hands-on engagement and informal science education.

The centre is a registered charity under Scottish law. It is funded through public support and donations from local corporate sponsors, and also includes a café.

The centre is located on Constitution Street. The building housing the attraction was formerly a depot for Aberdeen's tram network and had previously been based on Justice Mill Lane.

From 2018 to 2020, the centre operated temporarily from 107 George Street while its Constitution Street premises underwent a multimillion-pound renovation, which was completed in summer 2020.

== History ==
=== Conception ===
The centre was first proposed in 1985 with the establishment of the North Scotland Science and Technology Regional Organisation (SATRO).

Prior to the establishment of Satrosphere, SATRO North Scotland organised an annual showcase of computers at the Music Hall, with the inaugural event held on 7 December 1986.

In 1988, SATRO North Scotland received a grant of £60,000 from the Gatsby Charitable Foundation towards the establishment of the centre. A plan for Satrosphere to initially open on an interim basis in a building previously used by Woolmanhill Hospital as an accident and emergency department was unsuccessful in the same year due to budget constraints.

Following proposals to open the centre in Marywell Street School, a former primary school, and the recently-vacated Hilton Academy, SATRO North Scotland announced in October 1989 that the centre would be located on Justice Mill Lane and commence operations in the following year.

=== Opening ===
The attraction was opened on 15 February 1990 by Heather Couper. It was funded by Grampian Regional Council along with public donations.

=== Relocation ===
In February 2000, the Evening Express reported that Aberdeen City Council had found an owner for the property housing Satrosphere and that the centre would be required to vacate. In April 2000, the new location was revealed to be a former tram depot on Constitution Street near Aberdeen Beach.

The new location was opened by Heather Reid on 17 March 2001, following the original site's closure on 9 March.

In early 2016, the centre was renamed from Satrosphere to Aberdeen Science Centre.

=== Refurbishment ===
On 11 November 2018, Aberdeen Science Centre was closed for refurbishment, which included the addition of a mezzanine floor to the building. During this time, the centre relocated to George Street for the duration of the renovation, with the new premises opening on 19 November.

The refurbished centre reopened in November 2020 and was officially reopened in October 2021 by the Astronomer Royal for Scotland Catherine Heymans.

On 7 August 2021, Aberdeen Science Centre opened a free-to-access branch in the Bon Accord Centre to promote the reopening of its primary location. It subsequently closed and was replaced with a Superdry shop in 2025.

== See also ==
- Dundee Science Centre
- Dynamic Earth, science centre in Edinburgh
- Glasgow Science Centre
- List of science centers#Europe
