= Countryside Agency =

- Predecessor: Countryside Commission; Rural Development Commission
- Founded: 1999
- Defunct: 2006
- Successor: Natural England; Commission for Rural Communities

The Countryside Agency was a statutory body set up in England in 1999 with the task of improving the quality of the rural environment and the lives of those living in it. The agency was dissolved in 2006 and its functions dispersed among other bodies.

== Formation ==
The agency was formed by merging the Countryside Commission and the Rural Development Commission. Its powers were inherited from those bodies. The agency was based in Cheltenham with smaller offices in London and the regions. Total staff numbers were around 600.

== Role ==
The Agency was a government-funded advisory and promotional body; it owned no land and managed no facilities. Its funding came from the Department for Environment, Food and Rural Affairs (Defra) as an annual budget of around £100 million. The Countryside Agency worked with other bodies, such as local authorities, landowners and other public agencies, to provide grants and advice to conserve the natural beauty of the landscape, promote rural economies and make the countryside more accessible to the public.

The Countryside Agency had special responsibility for designating national parks and Areas of Outstanding Natural Beauty, defining heritage coasts, and establishing long-distance trails for walkers and riders. In 2003, it initiated the designation of England's newest national park, the South Downs National Park.

In 2004, the Agency partnered with the Countryside Council for Wales to introduce The Countryside Code, an updated version of The Country Code.

=== Millennium Greens ===
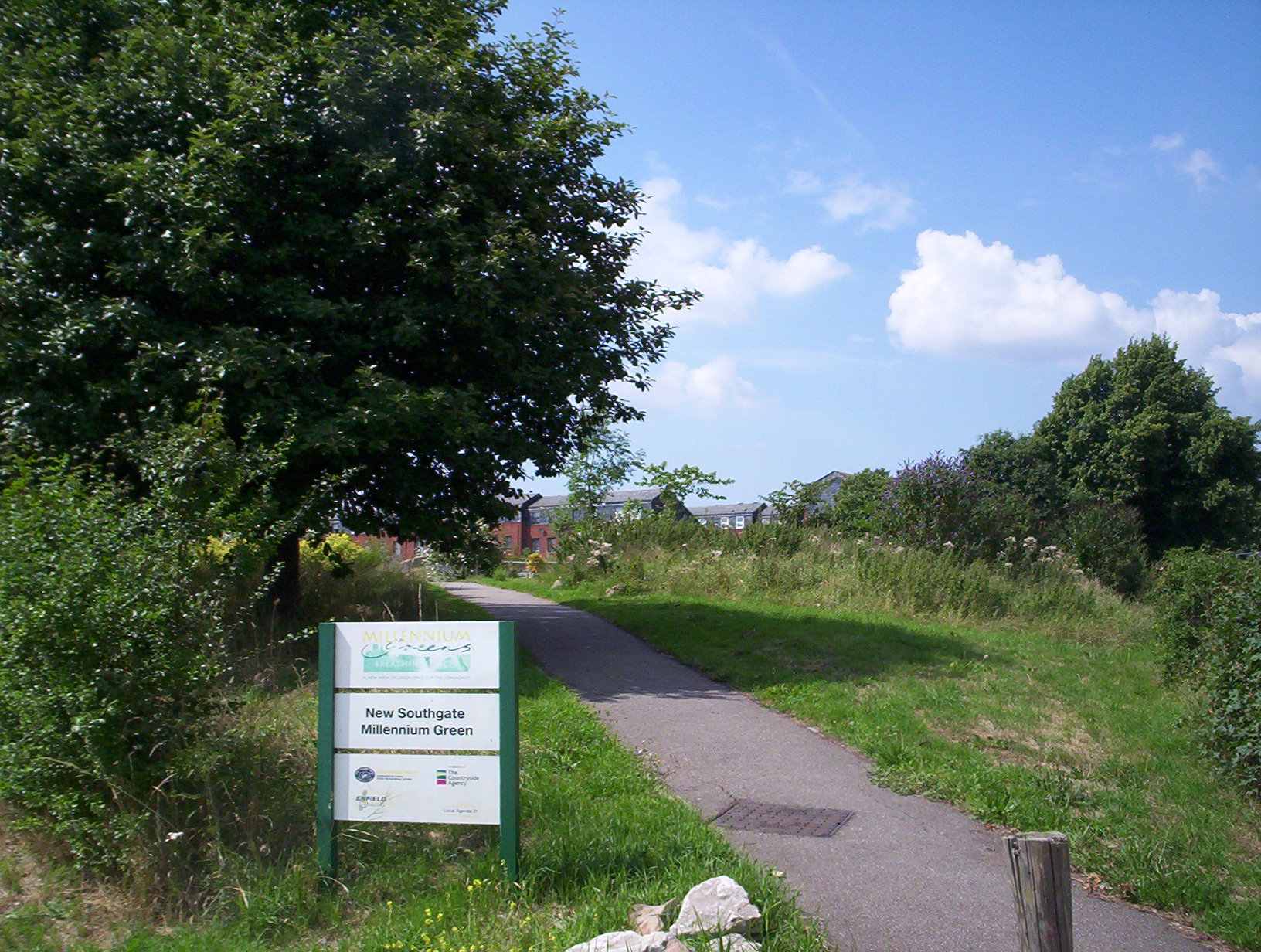
New Southgate Millennium Green, one of 245 completed by the Agency around the turn of the millennium

The Agency inherited a project to create Millennium Greens, and 245 out of the 250 planned were created by the end of the project, just after 2000. Minimal government responsibility for these greens was then passed to Natural England on its creation.

== Closure ==
Following a review by Christopher Haskins of several Government organisations involved in rural policy and delivery, the Natural Environment and Rural Communities Act 2006 dissolved the agency. Those parts of the Countryside Agency charged with environmental activity were merged with English Nature and parts of the Rural Development Service to form Natural England. The socio-economic functions of the Rural Development Commission had already transferred to the Regional Development Agencies in 1999 (they were in their turn replaced by local enterprise partnerships in 2012). The remaining parts of the Countryside Agency, largely research and policy functions, became the Commission for Rural Communities which was abolished in 2013.

== See also ==
- Area of Outstanding Natural Beauty
- Heritage coast
- Doorstep Greens
- Millennium Green
- Country park
- Community forests in England
- Rural community vibrancy index
