= Doorstep Greens =

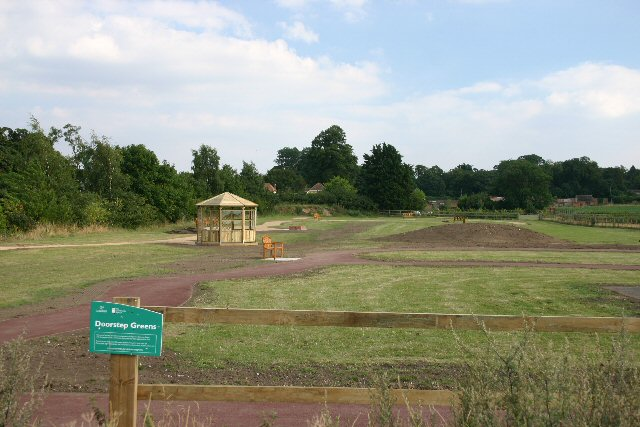
Doorstep Green at Cavenham

Doorstep Greens are locally owned and run public spaces across England. They were first created by the Countryside Agency (CA) in a project started in April 2001, providing grants of £10,000 to £150,000 to English communities, with a target of 200 communities total. The majority of the funding came from the New Opportunities Fund which later became the Big Lottery Fund although the Countryside Agency did input staff and some of its own resources. The Agency set out to find green spaces which could be organised into relatively small parks and then create a local charitable trust to own, fundraise for, and run each space in perpetuity. This followed from the completion of the CA's Millennium Green scheme, which created similar areas to celebrate the turn of the millennium from 1996-2000. The Countryside Agency has since become part of Natural England, who have nominal national responsibility for this scheme.

== Legacy ==
By the end of the project around 200 Greens had been created and mapped. Various Millennium Greens and Doorstep Greens have won numerous Green Flag and Green Pennant awards. The policy with Doorstep Greens was to encourage organisers to apply for a Green Flag award once their site was complete, thereby encouraging future management to a recognised standard. The National Audit Office, The Land Trust and other public bodies such as CabeSpace (now disbanded) used Doorstep Greens as case study material for their publications on community greenspace.

== See also ==
- Pocket park
- Millennium Green
