= Jardín Edith Sánchez Ramírez =

Coordinates: 19°24′48.5″N 99°9′42.5″W

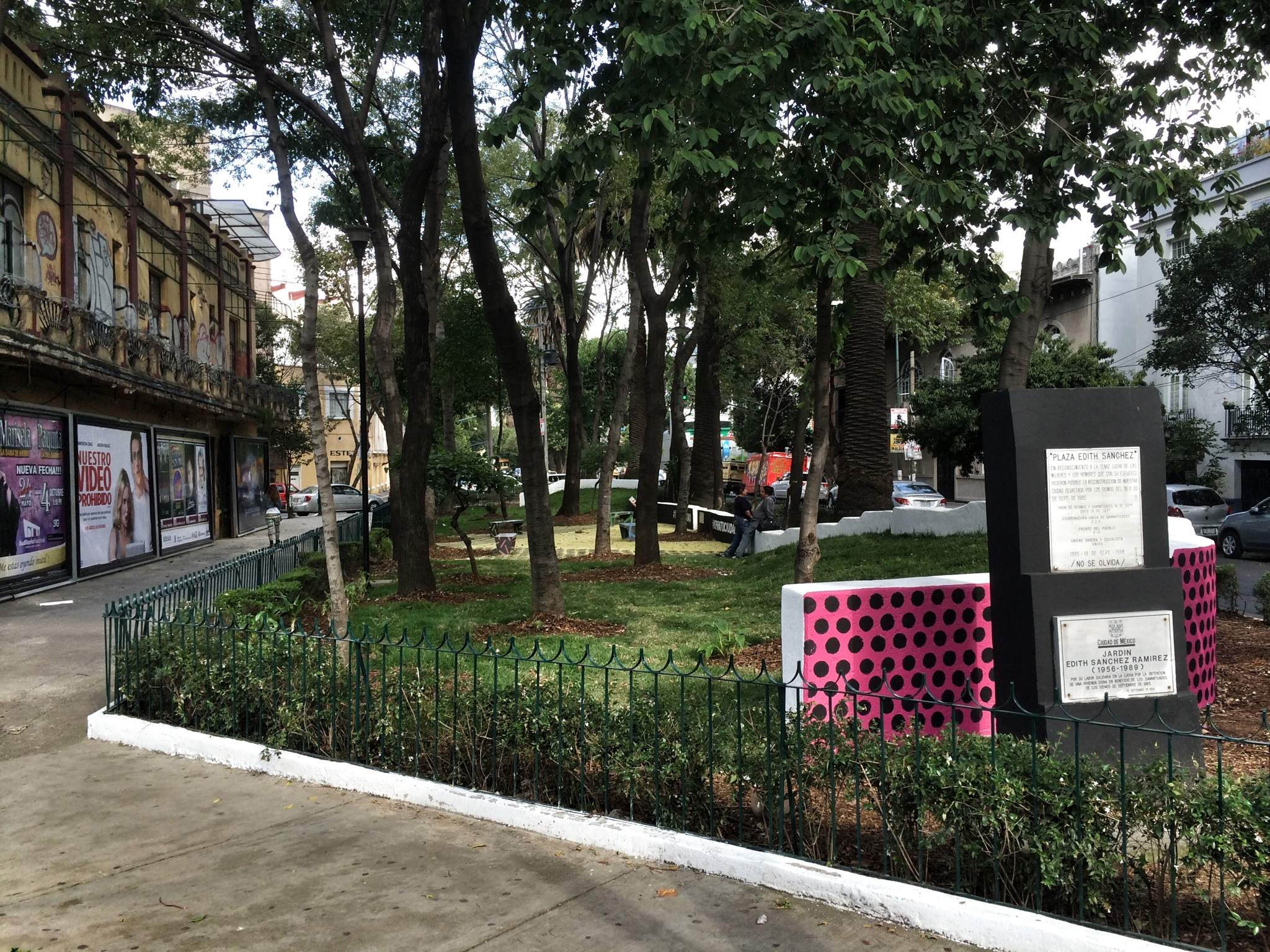
- Jardín Edith Sánchez Ramírez, August 2014
- Interactive map of Jardín Edith Sánchez Ramírez
- Type: Pocket park
- Location: Colonia Roma, Mexico City, Mexico
- Area: 584 square metres (6,290 sq ft)
- Elevation: 2,240 metres (7,350 ft)
- Opened: 2014 (renovated)
- Designer: Karina Flores; Jorge Ramos; Juskani Alonso
- Etymology: Edith Sánchez Ramírez, Mexican activist
- Open: 24 hours/day
- Status: Open all year
- Public transit: Hospital General

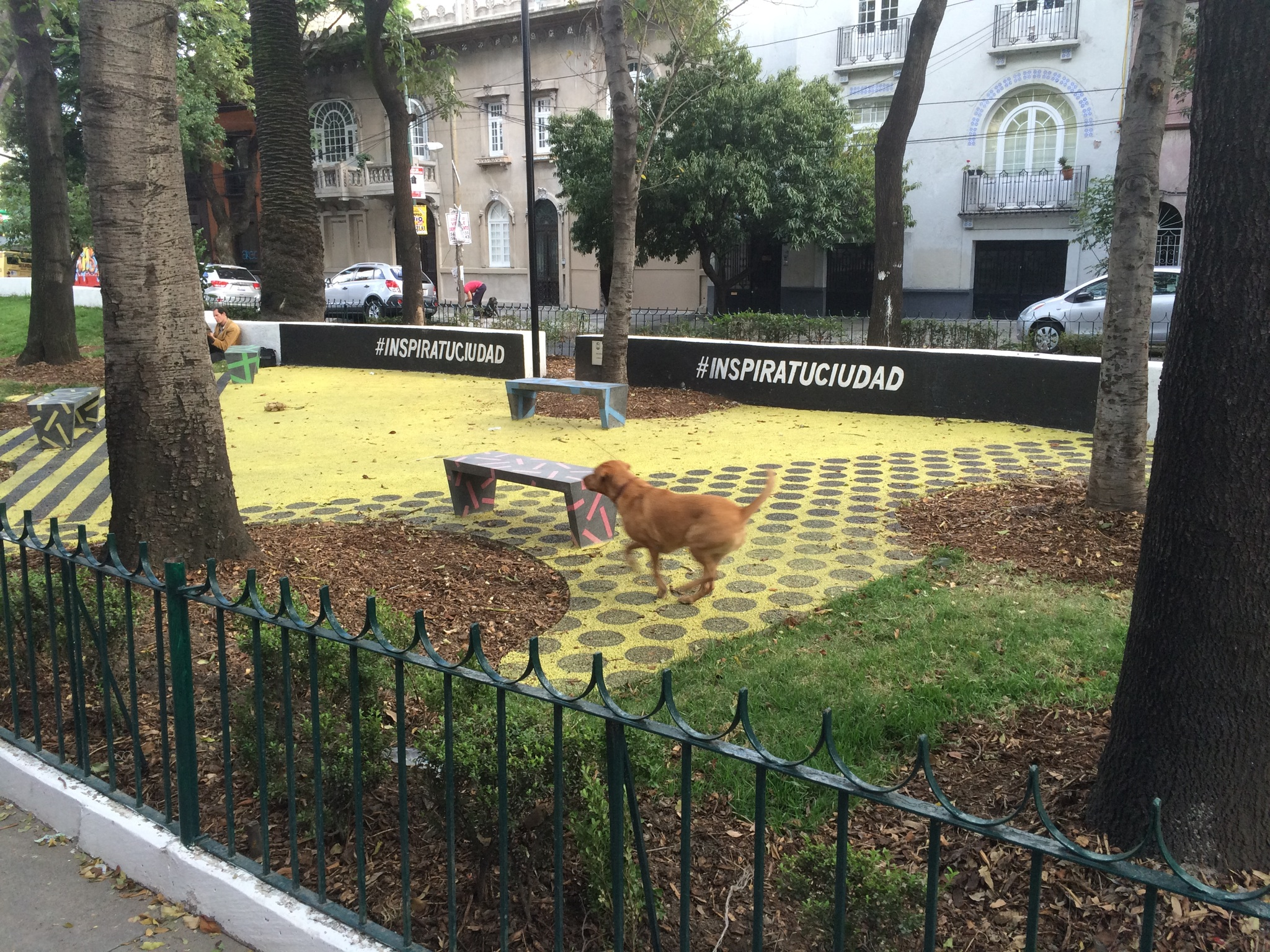
Dog playing in Jardín Edith Sánchez Ramírez

Jardín Edith Sánchez Ramírez is a pocket park in Colonia Roma, Mexico City. It is located in the triangle formed between calles Yucatán, San Luis Potosí and Tonalá, and covers 584 square metres.

== Namesake ==
The park is named after Edith Sánchez Ramírez, an activist who assisted victims of the 1985 Mexico City earthquake and took part in the subsequent recovery efforts through the Unión de Vecinos y Damnificados 19 de Septiembre (UVyD19), one of the neighbourhood organisations formed by displaced residents to press for housing.

== Renovation ==
By 2012 the park had fallen into disrepair, and had become a sanitation problem. It was renovated in 2014 by architects Karina Flores and Jorge Ramos with industrial designer Juskani Alonso, working alongside the Delegación Cuauhtémoc, local residents and the clothing brand American Eagle Outfitters.

According to Time Out México, all materials used in the reconstruction were recycled, and the design incorporated a permeable concrete additive to restore the site's capacity to absorb water, together with two absorption wells intended to help recharge the aquifer.
