= Glasgow Science Centre =

Science centre in Glasgow, Scotland

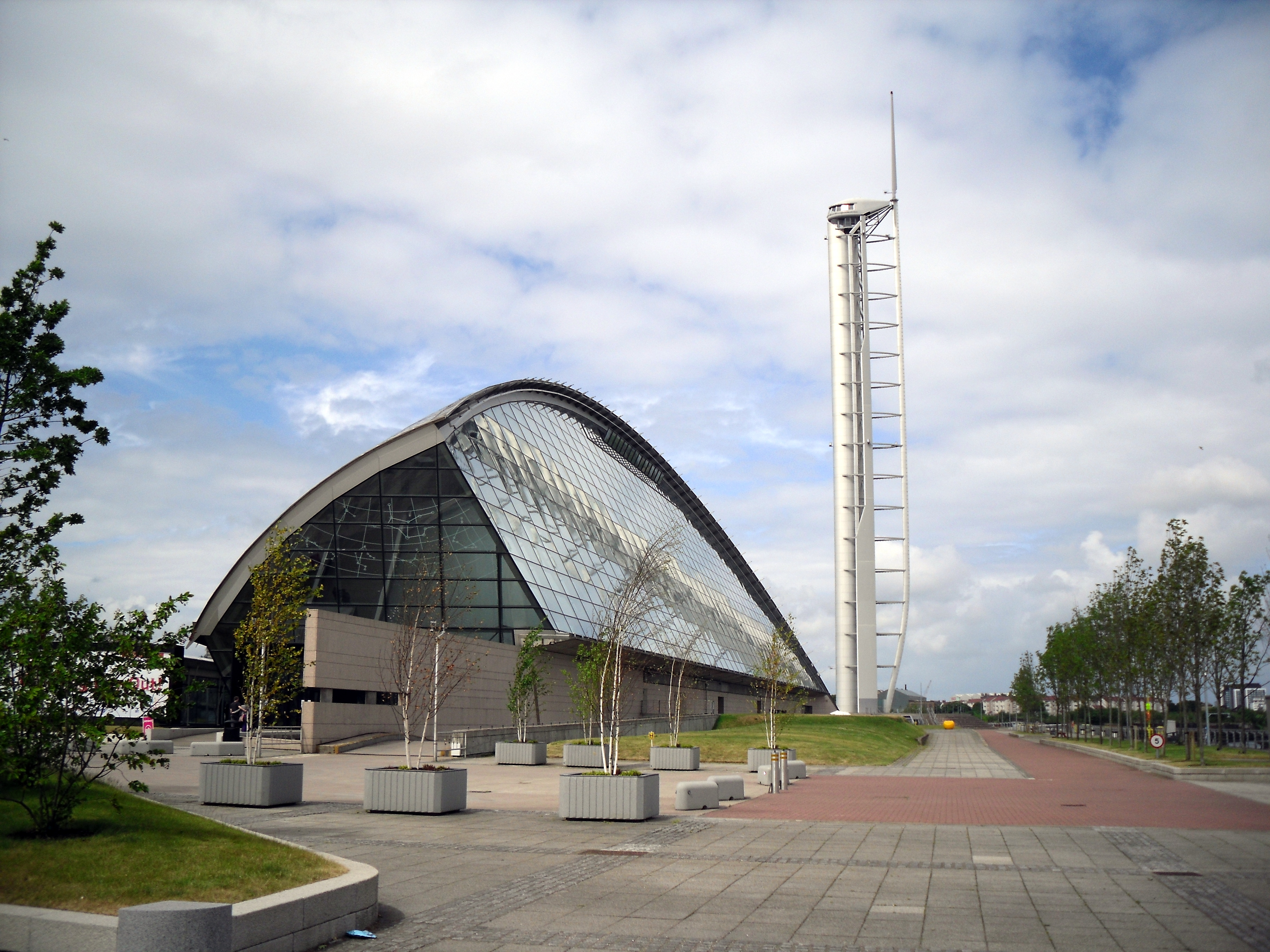
- Glasgow Science Centre and Glasgow Tower, the tallest structure in Scotland
- Established: 5 July 2001; 25 years ago
- Location: 50 Pacific Quay, Glasgow G51 1EA, Scotland
- Coordinates: 55.858542°N 4.293803°W
- Type: Science centre
- Visitors: 330,536 (2024)
- CEO: Dr Stephen Breslin
- Architect: BDP
- Owner: Glasgow Science Centre Ltd
- Public transit access: Cessnock; Exhibition Centre
- Website: www.glasgowsciencecentre.org

Glasgow Science Centre is a visitor attraction located in the Clyde Waterfront Regeneration area on the south bank of the River Clyde in Glasgow, Scotland. Queen Elizabeth II opened Glasgow Science Centre on 5 July 2001. It is one of Scotland's most popular paid-for visitor attractions. It is a purpose-built science centre composed of three principal buildings: Science Mall, Glasgow Tower and an IMAX cinema. It is a registered charity under Scottish law.

The Scottish tourist board, VisitScotland, awarded Glasgow Science Centre a five star rating in the visitor attraction category.

As well as its main location, Glasgow Science Centre also manages the visitor centre at Whitelee Wind Farm, which opened to the public in 2009.

== History ==
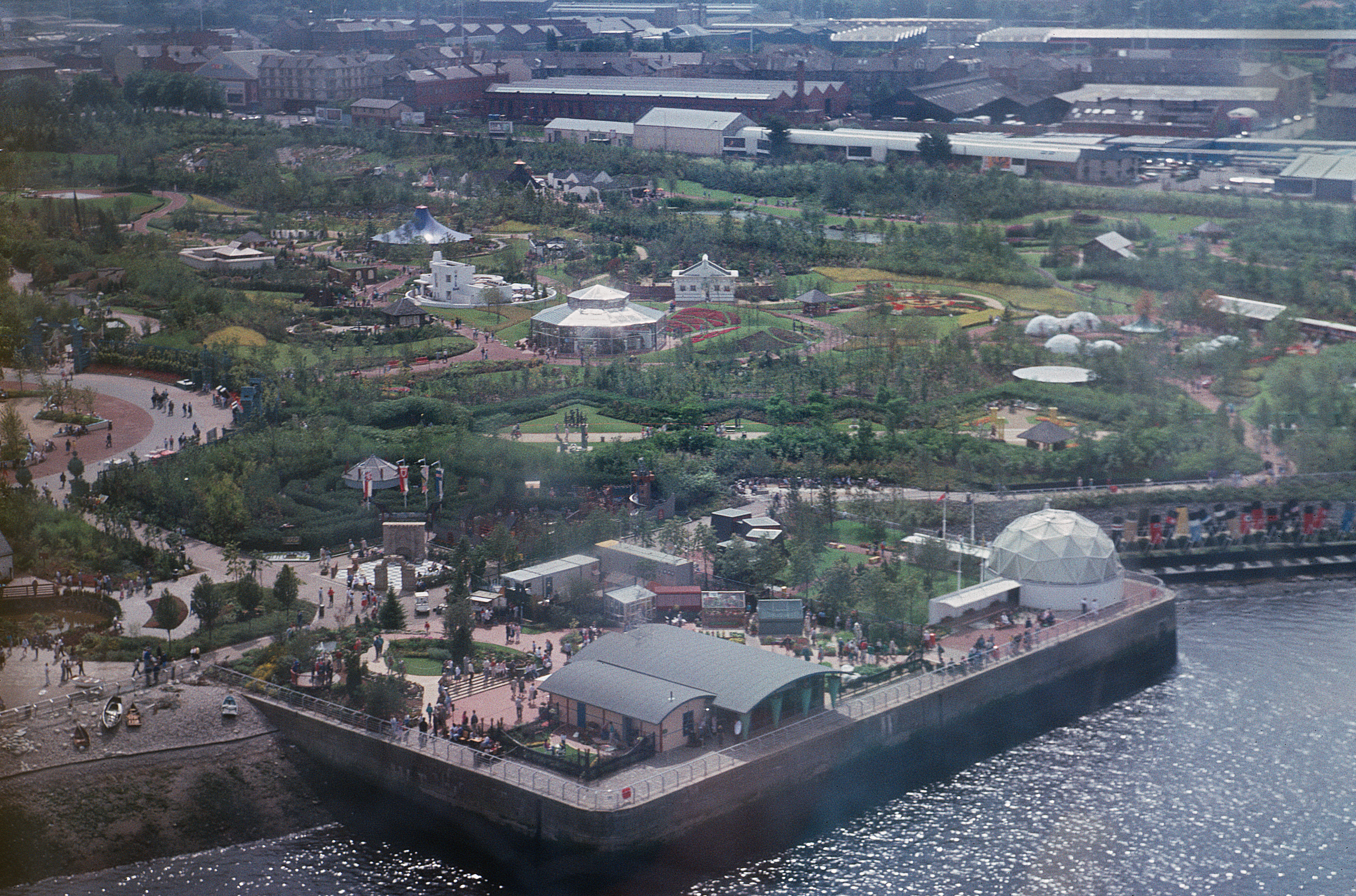
View of the Glasgow Garden Festival site

Opened to the public in June 2001, Glasgow Science Centre is part of the ongoing redevelopment of Pacific Quay, an area which was once a cargo port known as Prince's Dock. The redevelopment started with the Glasgow Garden Festival in 1988. As with the other National Garden Festivals, the 40-hectare (100-acre) Glasgow site was intended to be sold off for housing development, but due to a housing slump in 1987, the developers were unable to develop the land as they intended, and the majority of the site remained derelict for years. Parts were finally redeveloped for the Science Centre and also Pacific Quay, including new headquarters for BBC Scotland and Scottish Television, opened in 2006 and 2007. The Clydesdale Bank Tower was dismantled and re-erected in Rhyl in North Wales, however the Glasgow Tower, built as part of Science Centre complex, stands on approximately the same spot.

The architects of the Glasgow Science Centre were Building Design Partnership, however the Glasgow Tower was originally designed by the architect Richard Horden with engineering design by Buro Happold. It was built at a cost of around £75 million, including £10M for the Glasgow Tower, with over £37M coming from the Millennium Commission.

Each of the three buildings is clad in a different metal. Titanium is used on the IMAX, stainless steel on the Science Mall and aluminium on Glasgow Tower.

The Science Mall was originally clad with titanium and, together with the IMAX cinema, was Britain's only titanium-skinned building when completed. It opened only 4 years after the opening of the Guggenheim Museum Bilbao, the first building in Europe to be sheathed in titanium panels.

In 2018, the roof of the Science Mall 'melted', with the bituminous waterproof membrane seen leaking out between the titanium shingles. The building was subsequently re-roofed using stainless steel shingles, with work completed in 2023. In 2021, a £4.2 million transformation of the centre's external spaces was completed, known as the Connect: Outer Space project. Designed by Austin-Smith:Lord architects and carried out by Luddon Construction, the works were funded by the UK Research and Innovation Inspiring Science Fund and Sustrans Scotland. The project repurposed car parking to create a two-way cycle lane and cycle park, increased greenspace by 35%, and added new outdoor science exhibits along the Clyde waterfront. It was shortlisted for a Scottish Design Award in the Public Realm/Landscaping category and a Scottish Civil Engineering Award.

== Science Mall ==
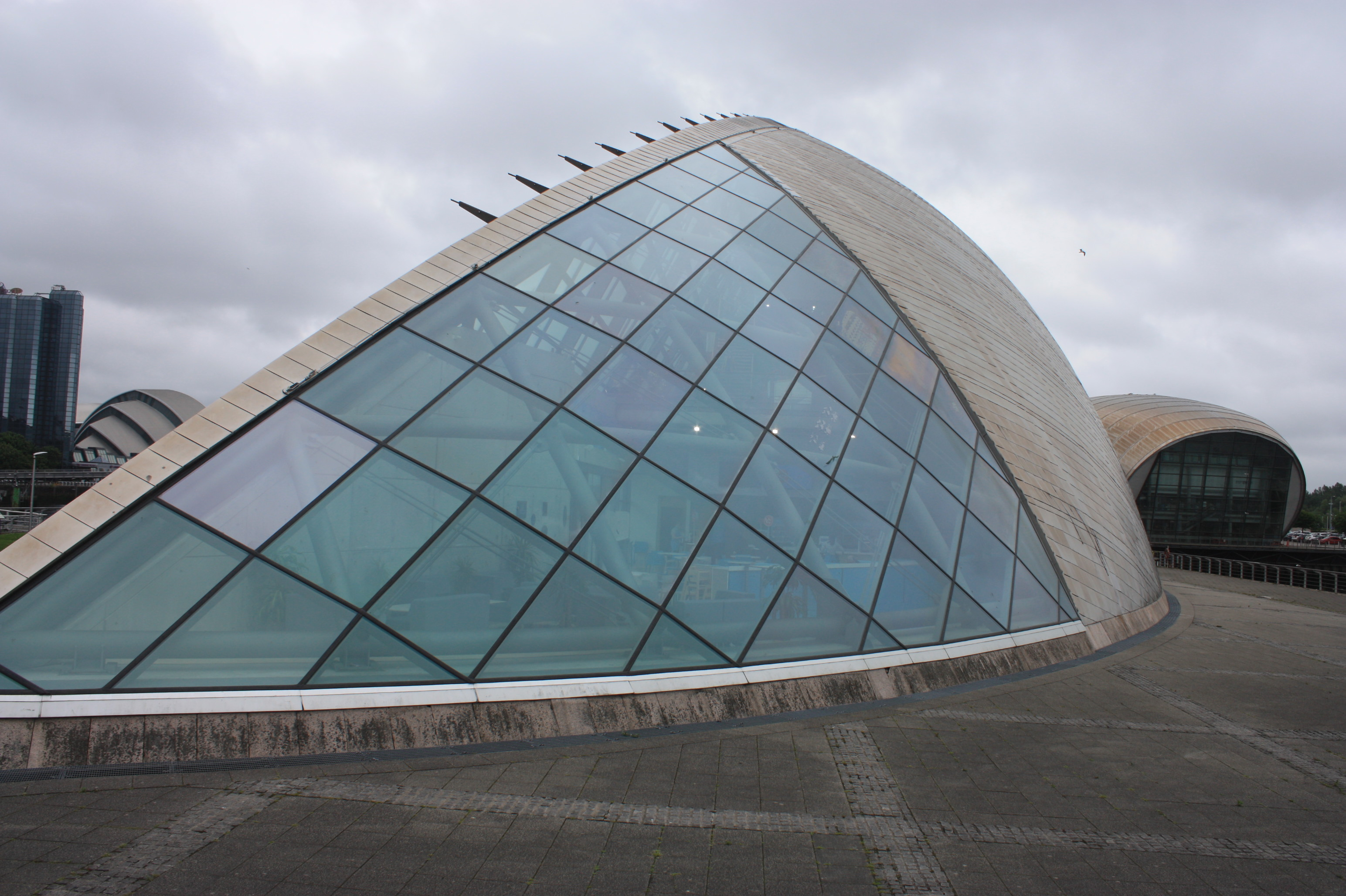
Glasgow Science Centre from the west

The largest of the three main, titanium-clad buildings takes a crescent shape structure and houses a Science Mall. In architectural terms it represents the canted hull of a ship, a reference to the adjacent "canting basin", where vessels were brought to have the marine growth removed from their hulls. Internally, there are three floors of over 250 science-learning exhibits. As is usual for science centres, the exhibits aim to encourage interaction, and can be used or played with as part of the informal learning experience the centre aims to deliver. The building was designed by BDP.

On Floor 1, amongst the many interactive exhibits that demonstrate scientific principles, visitors can access a Science Show Theatre and the Glasgow Science Centre Planetarium. The planetarium uses a fulldome digital projection system to project images on to a 15-metre diameter dome. There is an area specifically aimed at young children, called The Big Explorer.

On Floor 2, visitors can explore the energy which powers our modern lives and how we can begin to live sustainably in 'Powering the Future' exhibition and celebrate the innovative spirit in us all in the Idea No59 exhibition. There is also The Lab, primarily used as an educational workshop space.

Floor 3 was refurbished in 2012 and reopened to the public on 28 March 2013. It now houses an interactive exhibition about human health and wellbeing in the 21st century, called BodyWorks. Visitors are invited to consider their bodies, health and lifestyle from a new perspective through 115 interactive exhibits, research capsules and live laboratory experiences.

The Ground Floor of the Science Mall contains the ticket desk, cafes, gift shop, and a cloakroom. There are a number of flexible room spaces on the Ground Floor that are used for a variety of educational and corporate purposes: an education space called The Bothy and the Clyde Suite, a multi-purpose function space. Access to Glasgow Tower and the IMAX for the public is also via the Ground Floor.

== Glasgow Tower ==
The Glasgow Tower was designed to be the tallest freely-rotating tower in the world. It missed its opening date in 2001 and was plagued by problems since then. and was closed from August 2010 until July 2014.

== IMAX Cinema ==
The IMAX cinema was the first IMAX cinema to be built in Scotland. The single auditorium seats 370 in front of a rectangular screen measuring 24 by 18 metres (80 by 60 ft) and has the capability to show 3D films as well as standard 2D films in IMAX format. It opened to the public in October 2000, and premiered the first film, entitled "Dolphins", several months prior to the opening of the two other buildings. On 6 September 2013, Cineworld took over running the cinema. On 12 May 2021, Cineworld confirmed they are no longer operating the IMAX at the Glasgow Science Centre and intend to surrender the lease. Glasgow Science Centre announced the IMAX theatre would reopen on 5 May 2022.

== Funding issues ==
In June 2004, it was announced that about a fifth of the workforce were to be made redundant following the creation of a funding deal with the Scottish Executive. In June 2008, the leader of the Scottish Liberal Democrats, Nicol Stephen, stated that Glasgow Science Centre was facing a 40% cut in government funding. Although funding for the Scottish Science Centres as a whole has actually increased, it is now being split between four centres using a formula based on visitor numbers, and Glasgow is the only centre to face a reduction in budget. This led to the announcement in July 2008 that 28 full-time jobs were to be cut as a direct consequence of the cuts "in order to secure Glasgow Science Centre's future", according to the Chief Executive, Kirk Ramsay.

== In the media ==
Glasgow Science Centre is located in the Pacific Quay area, and as such, is surrounded by the media centres that form the Digital Media Quarter, a Scottish Enterprise development initiative, With the opening of the new STV headquarters in July 2006 and the beginning of broadcast programming from BBC Pacific Quay nearly a year later in April 2007, it can be expected that more programming will be filmed in the area.

In the CBeebies television programme Nina and the Neurons, the title character Nina is a neuroscientist who works at Glasgow Science Centre. In reality, Nina is played by the actress Katrina Bryan who is not a staff member at Glasgow Science Centre.

== See also ==
- Dynamic Earth - Science Centre in Edinburgh, Scotland
- Aberdeen Science Centre - Science Centre in Aberdeen, Scotland
- Dundee Science Centre - Science Centre in Dundee, Scotland
- List of science centers#Europe
