= New Village Press =

American non-profit book publisher

- Status: Active
- Founded: 2005
- Founder: Lynne Elizabeth (Director)
- Country of origin: United States
- Headquarters location: New York, New York
- Distribution: NYU Press
- Publication types: Books
- Official website: newvillagepress.org

New Village Press is a not-for-profit book publisher founded in 2005 in the San Francisco Bay Area now based in New York, New York. It began as a national publishing project of Architects/Designers/Planners for Social Responsibility (ADPSR), an educational non-profit organization founded in 1981.

New Village Press books address topics in the fields of social justice, urban ecology, community development and culture such as community arts, neighborhood commons, and participatory democracy.

In 2006, New Village Press was selected as the "Best Small Publisher in the East Bay", by East Bay Express. It partners with and is distributed by New York University Press.

== History ==
New Village Press originated as New Village Journal, a periodical published from 1999 until 2002, which focused on the revitalization of communities. In 2018, New Village Press incorporated as its own nonprofit, separating from Architects/Designers/Planners for Social Responsibility. New Village Press began a distribution partnership with NYU Press in 2018. Originally based in Oakland, CA, New Village Press is now situated in New York, NY.

== Recent titles ==
- DisElderly Conduct: The Flawed Business of Assisted Living and Hospice by Judy Karofsky (2025)
- Letters from the Edge: Outrider Conversations by Margaret Randall (2025)
- Inspired and Outraged: The Making of a Feminist Physician by Alice Rothchild (2024)
- Creative Instigation: The Art & Strategy of Authentic Community Engagement by Fern Tiger (2024)
- Portraits of Peacemakers: Americans Who Tell the Truth by Robert Shetterly (2024)
- See Me: Prison Theater Workshops and Love by Jan Cohen-Cruz (2024)
- The Women's Revolution: How We Changed Your Life by Muriel Fox (2024).
- Making a Way Out of No Way: Lives of Labor, Love, and Resistance by Merideth Taylor (2024)
- Random Kindness and Senseless Acts of Beauty— 30th Anniversary Edition by Anne Herbert, Paloma Pavel, and Mayumi Oda (2024)
- I Opened the Gate Laughing: An Inner Journey — 20th Anniversary Edition by Mayumi Oda (2024)
- Judith Letting Go: Six Months in the World's Smallest Death Cafe by Mark Dowie (2024)
- Luck by Margaret Randall (2023)
- That’s a Pretty Thing to Call It: Prose and Poetry by Artists Teaching in Carceral Institutions edited by Leigh Sugar (2023)
- Skyscraper Settlement: The Many Lives of Christodora House by Joyce Milambiling (2023)
- Stuff: Instead of a Memoir by Lucy R. Lippard (2023)
- Zoned Out! Race Displacement, and City Planning in New York City, (Revised Edition) edited by Tom Angotti and Sylvia Morse (2023)
- Art in a Democracy: Selected Plays of Roadside Theater, Vol 1 & Vol 2 edited by Ben Fink (2023)
- Art in a Democracy: Selected Plays of Roadside Theater, Volume 2: The Intercultural Plays, 1990-2020 edited by Ben Fink (2023)
- Art in a Democracy: Selected Plays of Roadside Theater, Volume 1: The Appalachian History Plays, 1975-1989 edited by Ben Fink (2023)
- A Peaceful Superpower: Lessons from the World’s Largest Antiwar Movement by David Cortright (2023)
- In the Camp of Angels of Freedom: What Does It Mean to Be Educated? by Arlene Goldbard (2023)
- Portraits of Earth Justice: Americans Who Tell the Truth by Robert Shetterly (2022)
- The Book of Judith: Opening Hearts Through Poetry edited by Spoon Jackson, Mark Foss, and Sara Press (2022)
- Inherited Silence: Listening to the Land, Healing the Colonizer Mind by Louise Dunlap (2022)
- We Built a Village: Cohousing and the Commons by Diane Rothbard Margolis (2022)
- Divining Chaos: The Autobiography of an Idea by Aviva Rahmani (2022)
- Meeting the Moment: Socially Engaged Performance, 1965–2020, by Those Who Lived It by Jan Cohen-Cruz and Rad Pereira (2022)
- Risking a Somersault in the Air: Conversations with Nicaraguan Writers (Revised edition) by Margaret Randall (2022)
- Artists in My Life by Margaret Randall (2022)
- Talking to the Girls: Intimate and Political Essays on the Triangle Shirtwaist Factory Fire edited by Edvige Giunta a Mary Anne Trasciatti (2022)
- Ecoart in Action: Activities, Case Studies, and Provocations for Classrooms and Communities edited by Amara Geffen, Ann Rosenthal, Chris Fermantle, and Aviva Rahmani (2022)
- Cultivating Creativity by Iain Robertson (2022)
- Portraits of Racial Justice: Americans Who Tell the Truth by Robert Shetterly (2021)
- Healing from Genocide in Rwanda: Rugerero Survivors Village, an Artist Book by Susan Viguers and Lily Yeh (2021)
- How Spaces Become Places: Place Makers Tell Their Stories by John F. Forester (2021)
- In the Struggle: Scholars and the Fight Against Industrial Agribusiness in California by Daniel J. O'Connell and Scott J. Peters (2021)
- Jane Jacobs’s First City: Learning from Scranton, Pennsylvania by Glenna Lang (2021)
- My Life in 100 Objects by Margaret Randall (2020)
- Main Street: How a City's Heart Connects Us All by Mindy Thompson Fullilove (2020)
- A Man of the Theater: Survival as an Artist in Iran by Nasser Rahmaninejad (2020)
- Visitors: An American Feminist in East Central Europe by Ann Snitow (2020)
- Waging Peace in Vietnam: U.S. Soldiers and Veterans Who Opposed the War edited by Ron Carver, David Cortright and Barbara Doherty (2019)
- Such a Pretty Girl: A Story of Struggle, Empowerment, and Disability Pride by Nadina LaSpina (2019)
- In the Company of Rebels: A Generational Memoir of Bohemians, Deep Heads, and History Makers by Chellis Glendinning (2019)
- Placemaking with Children and Youth: Participatory Practices for Planning Sustainable Communities by Victoria Derr, Louise Chawla and Mara Mintzer (2018)
- Works of Heart: Building Village Through the Arts by Lynne Elizabeth and Suzanne Young (2018)
- Conversations with Diego Rivera: The Monster in His Labyrinth by Alfredo Cardona Peña, translated by Alvaro Cardona-Hine (2018)
- Homeboy Came to Orange: A Story of People’s Power by Ernest Thompson and Mindy Thompson Fullilove (2018)
- The Earth, the City, and the Hidden Narrative of Race by Carl Anthony (2017)
- Beginner’s Guide to Community-Based Arts, 2nd Edition by Keith Knight and Mat Schwarzman (2017)
- Root Shock by Mindy Thompson Fullilove, New Village Press edition (2016)
- Openings by Sabra Moore (2016)
- Growing a Life by Illène Pevec (2016)

== Notable authors ==
- Carl Anthony, architect and environmental justice activist
- Linda Frye Burnham, a writer focused on performance and community arts
- William Cleveland, director of the Center for the Study of Art and Community
- David Cortright, American scholar and peace activist.
- Sharon Gamson Danks, environmental planner and founder of Bay Tree Design
- Mindy Thompson Fullilove, clinical psychiatrist and educator
- Arlene Goldbard, writer, social activist, and consultant
- Chester Hartman, urban planner, low-income housing advocate, and academic
- Anne Herbert (writer), former assistant editor of CoEvolution Quarterly
- Spoon Jackson, poet and writer who discovered his talent while serving a life sentence
- James Jiler, executive director of Urban GreenWorks
- Roger Katan, architect and artist
- Keith Knight (cartoonist), syndicated cartoonist
- Glenna Lang, illustrator, designer, and artist
- Annie Lanzillotto, poet and performance artist
- Nadina LaSpina, disability rights activist.
- Karl Linn, landscape architect and founder of the community garden movement in the United States
- Sabra Moore, artist and activist
- Beverly Naidus, artist and educator
- Illène Pevec, educator focusing on the development of youth gardens
- Margaret Randall, feminist poet and social activist
- Ronald Shiffman, cofounder of the Pratt Institute Center for Community and Environmental Development
- Judith Tannenbaum, writer and prison arts educator
- Lily Yeh, international artist
- Alfredo Cardona Peña, journalist, poet, essayist, biographer
- Louise Chawla, environmental activist with a focus on children and nature
- Ann Snitow, writer, teacher, feminist activist
- Nasser Rahmaninejad, artist, activist, lecturer on theatre and politics
