= Sabra Moore =

American artist, writer, and activist (born 1943)

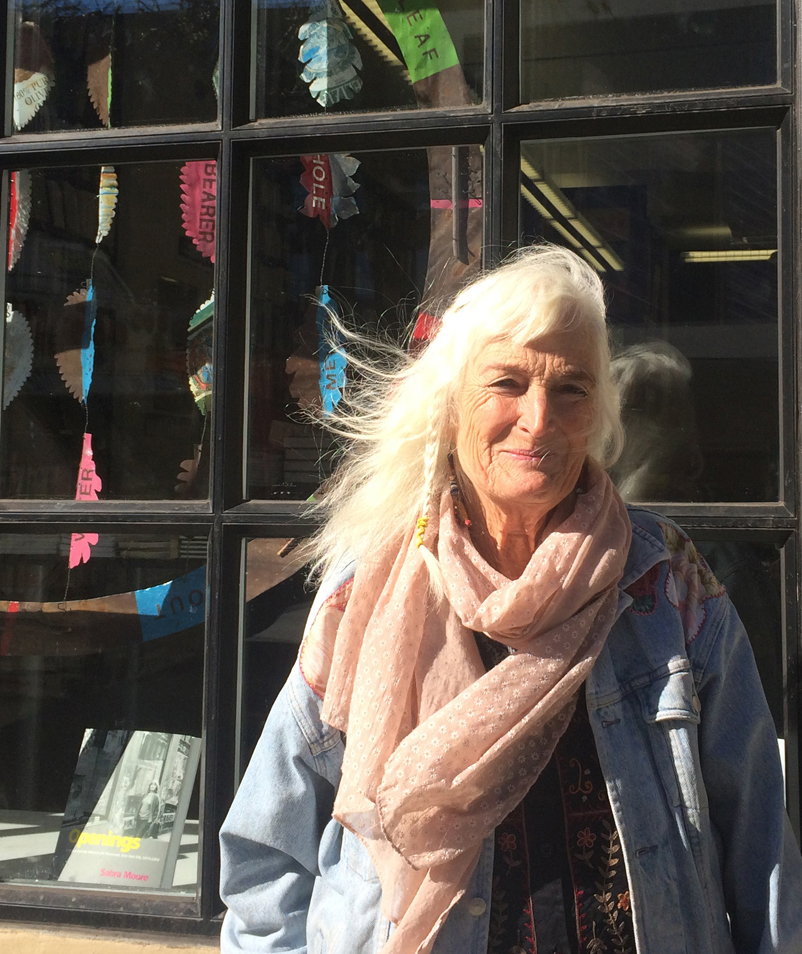
- Born: January 25, 1943 (age 83); Texarkana, Texas, U.S.
- Education: University of Texas at Austin
- Occupations: Artist, author, activist
- Notable work: Openings: A Memoir from the Women's Art Movement, New York City 1970-1992
- Movement: Women's art movement

Sabra Moore (born January 25, 1943) is an American artist, writer, and activist. Her artwork is based on re-interpreting family, social, and natural history through the form of artist's books, sewn and constructed sculptures and paintings, and installations.

She was a member of the Heresies Collective, the Women's Caucus for Art, and was a collaborator of the art collective RepoHistory. Moore is known for her large-scale, collaborative exhibitions of women's artwork including Views by Women Artists (1982), and the collaborative shows Reconstruction Project (1984) and Connections Project/Conexus (1987). She has exhibited her artwork widely since 1969 including 18 solo exhibitions and over 130 group exhibitions. She has authored two books, Petroglyphs: Ancient Language/Sacred Art (Clear Light Publishers 1997) and Openings: A Memoir from the Women's Art Movement, New York City 1970-1992 (New Village Press 2016). Moore also worked for thirty years as a freelance photo editor for New York-based publishers. Her artist's books can be found in several museum collections including those of the Brooklyn Museum and the Museum of Modern Art in NYC. The feature-length documentary film The Heretics (2011) includes her artistic and political work. She currently lives in Abiquiú, New Mexico.

== Early life ==
Sabra Moore grew up in Commerce, Texas. Her father was a railroad engineer for the Cotton Belt, and her mother was a first-grade school teacher. Her father was also an organizer for the Brotherhood of Locomotive Engineers and Trainmen. The labor meetings she witnessed as a child, where workers came together to stand up for their rights, influenced her own activism. Her first trips outside of Texas were to attend strikes. Moore grew up around the tradition of quilt making and believes her grandmother's textile crafts have influenced her own creativity.

== Education ==
Moore studied at the University of Texas at Austin in their liberal arts honors program called Plan II and graduated cum laude with a Bachelor of Arts in 1964. Moore was a finalist for a Woodrow Wilson scholarship.

== Peace Corps in Guinea, Africa, 1964-1966 ==
Moore joined the Peace Corps in 1964 and lived in Guinea, West Africa for two years. She taught English at École Technique in Nzérékoré, Guinea. A year after returning from Guinea, Moore was awarded a Fulbright fellowship to study African art at the Centre for West African Studies at the University of Birmingham in England. A few months into the fellowship, she returned to the United States.

== Life in New York City ==
Moore moved to New York City in 1966 and began studying at the Brooklyn Museum Art School. Her work was first exhibited as part of the group show Fifteen Artists curated by Henry Ghent at the Brooklyn Museum's Community Gallery in 1969. She taught English as a second language at Columbia University and taught an after-school children's arts class at the Brooklyn Museum while painting and attending anti-war demonstrations in her free time. She joined the Committee of Returned Volunteers (CRV) and continued protesting the war in Vietnam and Gulf Oil in Angola. Moore joined the Women Artists in Revolution (WAR). She also worked as a counselor for Women's Services, an abortion clinic sponsored by Judson Memorial Church and the Clergy Consultation Service. After she left the clinic, Moore worked with fellow artist Georgia Matsumoto as a freelance house painter for seven years. She continued creating artwork independently and attended meetings for the NYC/ Women's Caucus for Art. She also contributed to the publication Heresies, a New York-based feminist journal on art and politics produced by the Heresies Collective.

=== Counselor for Women's Services ===
From 1970 to 1972, Moore worked as a counselor for the Clergy Consultation Service on Abortion in Manhattan's Upper East Side, a service founded in 1967 to help women find medical practitioners who would perform the procedure. Moore had experienced an abortion herself when she was 21 years old.

=== Heresies Collective ===
From 1979 to 1991, Moore was a member of the Heresies Collective, which published Heresies: A Feminist Publication on Art and Politics from 1977 to 1992. Moore's involvement began when she started meeting regularly as part of the editorial collective of the Heresies Magazine Issue #13: Earthkeeping / Earthshaking: Feminism & Ecology 1979. She later became a member of the Mother Collective.

=== NYC/ Women's Caucus for Art ===
Moore was President of the Women's Caucus for Art from 1980 to 1982. She coordinated Views By Women Artists, sixteen independently curated shows in sixteen different venues showing the artworks of over 450 women artists. Moore curated a show called Pieced Work.

=== Women Artists Visibility Event, 1984 ===
Moore helped fellow artist Betsy Damon and President of the WCA Annie Shaver-Crandell organize a June 14, 1984 protest against the unequal representation of women and minorities in the New York Museum of Modern Art's exhibition An International Survey of Recent Painting and Sculpture. For the event, Moore built and painted a small wooden replica of the museum entitled Model MoMA. Marchers wrote their names on slips of paper and placed them inside the model in order to show their symbolic inclusion in the museum. Though there was no official name of the protest, it is known as the Women Artists Visibility Event (W.A.V.E.). Moore, Damon, and Shaver-Crandell were coordinators of the event, and the Heresies Collective, the Women's Interart Center, and the New York Feminist Art Institute became cosponsors. Slogans used in the protest included "The Museum Opens, But Not To Women Artists," "Let MoMA Know," and "Women's Visibility Event."

=== Other organizational involvement ===
Other organizations Moore was involved with during her time in New York included the Women's Action Coalition (WAC), a feminist direct-action organization founded in 1992 to fight discrimination against women, and Repo History, an artists collective that produced collaborative art projects highlighting the histories of working-class men and women, minorities and children.

=== Professional photo editing ===
Moore worked as a freelance photo editor for thirty years in NYC for publishers, including Doubleday, HarperCollins, American Heritage, and Random House. She was the sole picture editor for over 35 books including Francoise Gilot's Matisse and Picasso, Benita Eisler's O'Keeffe and Stieglitz: An American Romance, Robert Stern's Pride of Place, and Norma Mailer's Portrait of Picasso as a Young Man. Moore was the principal photo editor for Through Indian Eyes (Reader's Digest) and Bill Moyers and Joseph Campbell's The Power of Myth. She was the photo editor for five years of a magazine published by American Heritage Publishers, I&T: The American Heritage of Invention and Technology.

== The Heretics (2011) ==
Moore's artistic and political work is included in the feature film The Heretics. The Heretics focuses on the Heresies Collective as a microcosm of the larger movement at the time in which thousands of small, private groups of women were meeting together and devising strategies to fight for women's rights.

== Artistic themes ==
In her artwork, Moore explores the relationship between the personal and the political. Her work is based on re-interpreting family, social, and natural history through the form of artist's books, sewn and constructed sculptures and paintings, and installations. She has referred to her work as a "kind of personal archeology" explaining that she sees herself as a literate granddaughter who has synthesized the quilt making and storytelling traditions of her rural grandmothers into new forms. She is committed to the idea of placing artwork within a social context and has consistently worked with feminist and political art groups to do that. Her role as a long-time activist in the women's art movement demonstrates her dedication to both art and activism. She has organized several large-scale women's exhibitions in New York City, Brazil, Canada, and New Mexico on themes of social concern. Moore's current work is in the form of boats, cages, leaves or poles, and relates to issues of water and trees.

== Exhibitions ==
- 1982: Views by Women Artists (coordinated): Views by Women Artists was a series of 16 shows curated independently by sixteen different curators under the sponsorship of the NYC/ Women's Caucus for Art. Moore curated Pieced Work.
- 1984: The Reconstruction Project (organized and exhibited): The Reconstruction Project was a large-scale women's collaborative exhibition that was shown at Artists Space in New York City. It was part of Artists Call Against US Intervention in Central America (1984). The exhibition also traveled to Canada in 1987 where it was shown at the Powerhouse Gallery in Montreal and the Eye Level Gallery in Halifax. It was produced in response to the 1562 burning of the Mayan codices by Fray Diego de Landa and the ongoing massacres of Mayans during 1984. For the exhibition, Moore invited 20 women artists from diverse backgrounds including herself to re-create a codex in the format of the Dresden Codex, called Reconstructed Codex. Each artist made two pages and also made a 3-foot x 7 foot wall work in one of four directional colors.
- 1987: Connections Project/Conexus (co-organized and exhibited): Connections Project/Conexus, which Moore curated with Josely Carvalho, was a collaborative exhibition between 16 pairs of women artists in Brazil and the United States. It was exhibited in 1987 at the Museum of Contemporary Hispanic Art in SoHo New York and traveled to the Museum de Arte Contemporanea in São Paulo, Brazil.
- 1988: Committed to Print (exhibited): Committed to Print was open from January 31 to April 19, 1988, at the Museum of Modern Art (MoMA). The exhibition featured printed works related to Governments and Leaders, Race and Culture, Gender, Nuclear Power and Ecology, War and Revolution; and Economics, Class Struggle, and the American Dream. Both Reconstructed Codex (photocopier edition) and 150 Artists Book (Connections Project/Conexus) were included.
- 1997: Place/Displace (exhibited): Place/Displace was exhibited at the Sanctuario de Guadalupe, Santa Fe, New Mexico.
- 2007: Out of the Woods (exhibited): Out of the Woods was an exhibition presented by the Harwood Museum of Art of the University of New Mexico organized by Margaret Bullock. It was open from January 12 to March 4, 2007. Moore's work explored ecological, political, and personal concerns through constructed and painted artworks.
- 2003, 2014: The Farm Show (organized): The Farm Show and The Second Farm Show were exhibits hosted at the Bond House Museum in Española, NM. They were collaborations between artists and farmers that featured the family stories of twenty area growers. The Second Farm Show featured ten artists, 18+ Farm story banners, and 2003 Farm story banners.

== Archive ==
- The Sabra Moore NYC Women's Art Movement Collection, Barnard College (2016) In 2016, Barnard College acquired Moore's artistic and political collection. The collection showcases works regarding WAR (Women Artists in Revolution), Women's Services (the first legal abortion clinic in New York), the Heresies Collective, the 1984 MoMA demonstration, the NYC/Women's Caucus for Art, the exhibition Views By Women Artists (1982), and the collaborative show Reconstruction Project (1984). It includes letters, photographs, leaflets, artists books, catalogues, artifacts and other documents. Work from the exhibition Moore co-organized with Josely Carvalho entitled Connection Project/Conexus (1987) is present in the Barnard College Archive, with the exception of pieces by Louise Bourgeois, Ora Lerman, and Catalina Parra. On November 1, 2016, Moore read from her memoir Openings: A Memoir from the Women's Art Movement, New York City 1970-1992 as part of the Barnard Center for Research on Women's Lecture Series. Together, the collection and memoir feature over 180 different art works and 79 individual artists.

== Books ==
- Moore illustrated books with line drawings, including Through Indian Eyes (petroglyph drawings, Reader's Digest, 1996), Bulfinch's Mythology, edited by Richard Martin (HarperCollins, 1991), and Lizard's Kill by Pamela Christie (Lulu, 2015).
- 1997: Petroglyphs: Ancient Language / Sacred Art, Santa Fe: Clear Light Publishers. Foreword by Lucy R. Lippard. Petroglyphs features a collection of artistic renderings of ancient native art from all regions of the North American continent. Descriptions of the illustrations provide information on the location of each image, the culture from which it came, and what is known about its meaning for the people who created it. Moore's drawings include images of animals, objects, humans, hybrid human-animal forms, symbols, calendars and star markers, and celestial beings. The book also provides a record of many sites with Petroglyphs that are endangered, damaged, or have been recently destroyed.
- 2016: Openings: A Memoir from the Women's Art Movement, New York City 1970-1992, New York: New Village Press. Forewords by Lucy R. Lippard and Margaret Randall. Openings covers 22 years of Sabra Moore's life, art, and collaboration with other women artists. Moore's narrative is constructed from the numerous journals she kept over the years. It includes 949 images showcasing the artwork, exhibitions, protests, meetings, and posters that Moore and her fellow artists created in response to war, environmental degradation, violence against women, struggles for reproductive freedom, and racial tension.

== Personal life ==
Moore is married to artist Roger Mignon, whom she met in New York in 1975.

== New Mexico ==
In 1989, Moore and her husband bought land on the mesa in Abiquiú, New Mexico, where they built a house using traditional adobe and a studio using straw-bale construction. Moore and Mignon moved into their Abiquiú home in 1996. Since 1997, Moore has helped students across the Española School District create ceramic mosaics. These mosaics can be seen outside the walls of various schools in the area. Moore is also the board president of the Pueblo de Abiquiú Library. In 2013, she helped organize a scholarly project to collect the oral histories of Abiquiú residents who knew Georgia O'Keeffe. She was also instrumental in developing the Abiquiú Library's series of walking tours for visitors. Moore is in charge of operations for the Española Farmer's Market. She organized The Farm Show and The Second Farm Show, exhibits hosted at the Bond House Museum in Española, New Mexico, that brought together artists and farmers and featured the family stories of area growers. Moore has also made artist's books and yearly postcards with farmers at the Española Farmer's Market.

== Honors and awards ==
- Most Outstanding Independent Woman Student, Marjorie Darlik Memorial Award, 1964, University of Texas
- Fulbright Fellowship, 1967, Centre for West African Studies, The University of Birmingham, England
- Artist Residency, 1991, 1989, 1988, 1986, The Helene Wurlitzer Foundation of New Mexico
- Jurors Award, Second Place, 2000, First Logan Biennial National Outdoor Sculpture Exhibition, Utah State University at Logan
- Rita Bass Award, 2004, North American Sculpture Exhibition, Foothills Art Center
