= Fullilove =

Fullilove is an English surname. Notable people with the name include:

- Donald Fullilove (born 1958), American film and voice actor
- Michael Fullilove, Australian think tank executive director
- Mindy Thompson Fullilove (born 1950), American social psychiatrist
- Robert Fullilove (born 1944), American public health researcher and civil rights activist
