= Lucy Gwin =

American disability rights activist

- Lucy Gwin, from the 1960 yearbook of Thomas Carr Howe Community High School
- Born: January 5, 1943; Beech Grove, Indiana
- Died: October 30, 2014 (aged 71); Washington, Pennsylvania
- Occupation: Disability rights activist

Lucy Gwin (January 5, 1943 – October 30, 2014) was an American disability rights activist. She published Mouth, a disability rights magazine.

== Early life and education ==
Gwin was born in Beech Grove, Indiana, the daughter of Robert Willard Gwin and Verna Bodine Gilcher Gwin. Her father worked in advertising and her mother was a teacher who later designed window displays for department stores. She graduated from Thomas Carr Howe Community High School in Indianapolis in 1960.

== Career ==
Gwin ran a restaurant in Rochester, New York and wrote advertising copy as a young woman. She wrote a "strong and vivid" memoir, Going Overboard (1982), about her year spent working on an oil rig ferry in the Gulf of Mexico. She was working on another book, tentatively titled The Marriage Conspiracy, and lecturing on the subject of marriage, in the mid-1980s.

Gwin was disabled following a car accident in 1989. The abuses she witnessed in her stay at a rehabilitation facility afterward fueled her concern for the rights of institutionalized people. The facility was eventually closed as a result of her efforts and the investigations that followed. In 1990 she began publishing Mouth, a disability rights magazine. "She gave a place for what would be perceived as a radical disability rights voice, and she was fierce in that voice", explained colleague Bruce Darling in a 2021 article. "Everyone was a little scared of her." She worked closely with photographer Tom Olin and writers Josie Byzek and Dave Hingsburger, among others. Mouth ran for 109 issues, before it ceased publication in 2008.

Gwin joined other disability rights activists in protesting the legalization of assisted suicide outside the Supreme Court in 1997, telling a reporter "I'm not going to die for Jack Kevorkian or anybody just because they think I'm not pretty to look at".

== Publications ==
- Going Overboard: The Onliest Little Woman in the Offshore Oilfields (1982)
- "Don't give us death by pity" (1997)

== Personal life and legacy ==
Gwin married three times, and had two children. She died in 2014, at the age of 71, at her home in Washington, Pennsylvania. There is a collection of her papers, including a run of Mouth magazine, at the University of Massachusetts. A biography of Gwin, This Brain Had a Mouth by James M. Odato, was published in 2021, with an introduction by Nadina LaSpina.
