= Robert Fullilove =

American public health researcher

- Born: January 25, 1944 (age 81)
- Education: Colgate University (B.A.); Syracuse University (M.S.); Columbia University (EdD)
- Spouse: Mindy Thompson Fullilove (m. 1983; div. 2009)
- Scientific career
- Institutions: Columbia University Irving Medical Center
- Thesis: A study of the relative efficiency of regression analysis, discriminant analysis, and log linear analysis in predicting the future enrollment status of educational opportunity fund students in two New Jersey colleges (1984)

Robert Elliot Fullilove (born January 25, 1944) is an American public health researcher and civil rights activist. He is a Professor of Sociomedical Sciences at the Columbia University Irving Medical Center and Associate Dean of Community and Minority Affairs. He has worked on the health of people from ethnic minority backgrounds, with a focus on sexually transmitted infections and HIV.

== Early life and education ==
Fullilove was born to Robert Fullilove, a physician, and Helen Fullilove. Fullilove's grandfather was from Yazoo City, Mississippi, and was one of the first Black physicians in the area.

Fullilove attended the Pingry School. In 1966, he earned a B.A. in philosophy and religion from Colgate University. In 1972, Fullilove earned a M.S. in instructional technology from Syracuse University. In 1984, Fullilove earned Ed.D. in higher and adult education and statistics from the Teachers College, Columbia University, where he studied the educational opportunities of students in New Jersey.

== Career ==
While in college, Fullilove was part of voter registration efforts in Mississippi as part of the Mississippi Freedom Summer.

In 1969 Fullilove joined the faculty State University of New York cooperative college centre, before moving to the University of California, Berkeley as a research associate. Fullilove started working on HIV/AIDS prevention in the 1980s, when 1 in 5 of Americans living with HIV were African American. As the HIV spread around the United States, Nixon's creation of the Drug Enforcement Administration meant that people of colour were disproportionately being locked up in prison. Fullilove has argued that drug abuse is first and foremost a public health challenge, and should not be treated as a criminal justice issue. By locking up people who were most likely to suffer from HIV, the spread of HIV/AIDS accelerated both in prisons and in the communities that prisoners returned to. Fullilove has argued that society, and particularly mass incarceration, allowed HIV/AIDS to disproportionally impact people from minority backgrounds.

In 1995 he joined the National Academy of Medicine (then Institute of Medicine) on the Board of the Health Promotion and Disease Prevention committee. He has served on various committees for the National Academy of Medicine, including those which focus on substance abuse and addition. He joined Columbia University in 1990 and was promoted to Professor of Sociomedical Sciences in 2004.

From 2010 he started to teach public health in several New York State prisons through the Bard College Prison Initiative. Whilst the programme started with only 15 students, by 2015 there were almost 300 registered each year. He has continued to support the programme throughout his career, eventually being made a senior advisor. Looking back on a decade of the initiative, Fullilove said "the success of this program in creating college graduates committed to pursuing careers in public health cannot be underestimated".

During the COVID-19 pandemic, Fullilove became concerned that coronavirus disease would easily be transmitted around prisons and homeless shelters.

== Awards and honours ==
- 1995 Columbia University Mailman School of Public Health Teaching Award
- 2001 Columbia University Mailman School of Public Health Teaching Award
- 2003 National Associate of the National Academies of Science
- 2002 Bank Street College of Education Honorary Doctorate
- 2010 POZ 100
- 2011 AIDS Service Center New York City Positive Changemakers
- 2012 PHANYC Allan Rosenfield Award for Public Health and Social Justice
- 2013 Columbia University Mailman School of Public Health Teaching Award

== Selected publications ==
- Fullilove, Robert E.; Treisman, Philip Uri (1990). "Mathematics Achievement Among African American Undergraduates at the University of California, Berkeley: An Evaluation of the Mathematics Workshop Program". The Journal of Negro Education. 59 (3): 463–478. doi:10.2307/2295577. ISSN 0022-2984. JSTOR 2295577.
- MD, Mindy Thompson Fullilove; EdD, Robert E. Fullilove III; MBA, Katherine Haynes; MPH, Shirley Gross (1990-02-01). "Black women and aids prevention: A view towards understanding the gender rules". The Journal of Sex Research. 27 (1): 47–64. doi:10.1080/00224499009551541. ISSN 0022-4499.
- Fullilove, Robert E.; Fullilove, Mindy Thompson; Bowser, Benjamin P.; Gross, Shirley A. (1990-02-09). "Risk of Sexually Transmitted Disease Among Black Adolescent Crack Users in Oakland and San Francisco, Calif". JAMA. 263 (6): 851–855. doi:10.1001/jama.1990.03440060097039. ISSN 0098-7484. PMID 2296147.

== Personal life ==
Fullilove married Mindy Thompson Fullilove, a clinical psychiatrist at The New School, in 1983. They divorced in 2009.
