= Karl Linn =

American architect (1923–2005)

- Born: Karl Linn; March 11, 1923; Dessow, Germany
- Died: February 3, 2005 (aged 81); Berkeley, California, U.S.
- Occupations: Landscape architect, psychologist, educator, community activist
- Known for: Creator of "neighborhood commons" and "urban barnraising"
- Notable work: Building Commons and Community (2007)
- Spouse: Nicole Milner
- Children: 2

Karl Linn (March 11, 1923 – February 3, 2005) was an American landscape architect, psychologist, educator, and community activist, best known for inspiring and guiding the creation of "neighborhood commons" on vacant lots in East Coast inner cities during the 1960s through 1980s. Employing a strategy he called "urban barnraising," he engaged neighborhood residents, volunteer professionals, students, youth teams, social activists, and community gardeners in envisioning, designing, and constructing instant, temporary, and permanent gathering spaces in neighborhoods, on college campuses, and at sites of major conferences and events. "Linn is considered 'Father of American Participatory Architecture' by many academic colleagues and architectural and environmental experts of the National Endowment for the Arts."

In the 1990s his focus shifted to creating commons in community gardens. Many of his pilot projects, designed to cultivate community and peace among people, are documented in his book Building Commons and Community (New Village Press, 2007).

== Youth ==
=== Early life in rural Germany ===
Karl grew up on a fruit tree farm in Dessow, a small village 92 kilometres (57 mi) northwest of Berlin. His mother, Henriette (Henny) Rosenthal, had purchased the parcel of 20 morgen (over 12 acres) in 1913 from Eigene Scholle (literally: own soil), a company who, inspired by the land reform movement and the writings of Franz Oppenheimer, had bought and parceled the manor estate of Dessow. Henny designed and supervised the building of a house, planted orchards, and named the property the Immenhof (literally: "bee colony farm"). The bees in the 36 hives she kept were good pollinators. Her cherries, apples, pears, plums, and berries were eagerly awaited in Berlin marketplaces. The farm was also an accredited training center for gardeners and one of the first sites to practice horticultural therapy. The impact of living on a farm and seeing his mother and other women tilling the land stayed with Karl throughout his life.

In 1921 Henny married Josef Lin, a widower with three children, whom she adopted. Josef was Chief Librarian of the Jewish Community Center in Berlin. He had edited Hakeshet (The Rainbow), the first magazine of modern Hebrew writers and poets, published from 1903 to 1906, and wrote a seminal reference book on the evolution of the Hebrew press, first published in 1928 and still used today.

The only Jews in their village, the Lins became a target for Nazi persecution. Josef was forced to flee to Palestine in 1933. Henny, Karl, and his older sister, Bella, followed in 1934 after selling the Immenhof at about an eighth of its value.

=== Youth in Palestine ===
The Lin family started a small farm near Haifa, and at age 14 Karl left school to farm and support his parents, who had become too sick to work. He returned to school later when his parents moved inland to be close to Karl's older sister, Bella, and her family. Karl graduated from the Kadoorie Agricultural High School, with specialization in landscape gardening. He put his skills to use as he joined 35 youth from the coeducational scout movement to found Kibbutz Ma'agan Michael. Although inspired by the vision of creating a new homeland, Karl was sometimes puzzled and uneasy about how fellow Jews treated their Arab neighbors. At age 20, when a back injury limited his capacity to contribute physically to the work of the kibbutz, he moved to Tel Aviv to be closer to his brother Theo, who was guiding his intellectual development. There Karl directed an elementary school gardening program that engaged students in growing food for their own lunches.

== Career ==
=== Becoming a psychologist ===
Influenced by the writings of A. S. Neill and Wilhelm Reich, Karl entered psychoanalysis to heal his personal wounds and become a more effective human being. He was driven by a desire to understand the roots of the prejudice, brutality, and fanaticism he had observed and experienced. At age 23, he moved to Switzerland and was trained as a psychoanalyst at the Institute for Applied Psychology in Zurich. He immigrated to New York in 1948, with the goal of engaging in the new body-oriented therapy developed by Wilhelm Reich. To further his education Karl attended night classes at the New School for Social Research, studying with prominent gestalt psychologists.

Through one of his Swiss professors Karl was introduced to social psychologist Lawrence K. Frank, who became an important mentor. Ellen Reece, a friend of Frank, hired Karl as the founding director of the Reece School for emotionally disturbed children. Karl also conducted a private practice as a child psychoanalyst. After 2 ½ years of Reichian therapy he decided to give up his work as a teacher and therapist so he could focus on his own therapeutic process. Eager to exercise his creativity he decided to re-enter landscape architecture, which he felt had potential as a healing profession.

=== Private practice in landscape architecture ===
Starting as a laborer, Karl gradually developed a landscape contracting business and later a highly respected private practice in landscape architecture. His most complex and prestigious project was designing an interior landscape for The Four Seasons Restaurant in the newly constructed Seagram Building. His ground-breaking work helped pave the way for the emerging field of large-scale interior landscape architecture. He designed landscapes for affluent owners of residential and corporate properties in and around Manhattan and along the Eastern seaboard. Despite critical acclaim, access to the highest quality materials, and the satisfaction of designing beautiful spaces, he was increasingly disturbed by the isolation of nuclear families that his designs reinforced and disheartened by the declining social relevance of his work.

=== Professor of environmental design ===
In 1959 he decided to accept the invitation of Ian McHarg to join the Landscape Architecture department at the University of Pennsylvania in Philadelphia, as the second full-time faculty member. While McHarg was expanding landscape architecture by developing the science of physical ecology and applying it to regional planning, Karl focused on the small-scale neighborhood environment, probing the intimate and qualitative relationships between people of all ages and their physical surroundings. Karl's innovative curriculum for the first-year graduate students engaged them as artists and philosophers, as craftspersons, and as social activists.

Wishing to nurture the development of livable neighborhood communities Karl took his students into inner city neighborhoods where they provided community design-and-build service to the economically disenfranchised residents. Using a participatory process they engaged residents with volunteer professionals and work teams in envisioning, designing, and constructing "neighborhood commons"—combination park / playground / community gathering places – on derelict vacant lots. Karl likened this "urban barnraising" to his experience as a young man in Palestine collaboratively building a kibbutz. One of Linn's first experiments in constructing a neighborhood commons was in the Poplar neighborhood of Philadelphia, where community organizations collaborated with Linn and his students at the University of Pennsylvania to construct a park out of salvaged materials.

While at Penn, Karl developed a strong friendship with architect Louis Kahn, a fellow professor, who became another important mentor and supporter. When the dean argued that Karl was confusing landscape architecture with social service, Kahn wrote him a letter explaining the value of Karl's approach to the students' development. Social philosopher Lewis Mumford was another Penn professor who encouraged Karl in his work.

The success of community-design-service education led Karl to found and direct pioneering community design-and-build centers, which became models for the Domestic Peace Corps—the Neighborhood Renewal Corps Nonprofit Corporation of Philadelphia in 1961 and the Neighborhood Commons Nonprofit Corporation of Washington, D.C., in 1962. That same year he also developed the first landscape technicians training program for high school dropouts in Washington, D.C. Thereafter he inspired into being community design-and-build centers in eight other cities, and conducted community-design-service-education programs at various universities in the United States and abroad.

For the next twenty-five years Karl served on the faculties of prominent universities, such as Massachusetts Institute of Technology and New Jersey Institute of Technology, promoting community landscape design and resource development in the service of social justice and peace. He was active in the American Society of Landscape Architects and gave lectures and workshops at conferences and universities throughout the world.

=== Mentors reflecting on Karl's work ===
"He [Karl] is not merely a theorist, but a maker bent on expressing environmental validity through his natural adjustability and resourcefulness. His design tendencies are noble. He is often forced to use frugal means, but always rejects what is done through design only for design's sake." --Louis I. Kahn, architect, 1967

"If Karl Linn can get his ideas recognized and applied, I believe we can have a profound improvement in city living and a reduction in the present untoward consequences of urban development which so completely overlooks children and youth and forgets about providing for people to live and enjoy living."—Lawrence K. Frank, social psychologist, Belmont, Massachusetts, 1962 (Letter to Editor, published in Landscape Architecture.)

"I am delighted with the vigorous ways you are challenging current clichés, not only in theory but in practice. I can plainly see, in the work you are doing, the fresh shoots that will flower in a new age."--Lewis Mumford, social philosopher and urban planner, 1961

=== Working for peace ===
During his sabbatical in 1984, Karl worked full-time for nuclear disarmament. In Chicago, he collaborated with colleagues from a number of different cities to found the national organization Architects/Designers/Planners for Social Responsibility (ADPSR) and served as chair of its Committee on Education. In 1986 the urgency of that work convinced him to take an early retirement from his tenured position at the New Jersey Institute of Technology. Drawing upon the "Despair and Empowerment" process developed by Buddhist scholar Joanna Macy and her colleagues, Karl worked with groups of students and colleagues to stage conferences and other events to help members come to grips emotionally with the threat of nuclear war. They designed and constructed temporary indoor commons to humanize large institutional spaces and provide a welcoming space for participants could gather to share thoughts, feelings, and stories and give one another support. Karl organized many charettes for the design of peace centers, gardens, and monuments and staged ceremonial peace tree plantings. At the 1986 annual meeting of the American Society of Landscape Architects in San Francisco he and colleagues created a program and small book called "The Emerging Landscape of Peace." They called on the organization to approve a policy recommending a nuclear-free future, which was passed by the Board. At the 1988 Congress of the International Federation of Landscape Architects in Boston, Karl recruited 20 colleagues to present papers at workshops on "Places for Peace" and published them in a book by that name.

=== Community garden commons on the West Coast ===
After glasnost initiated by Mikhail Gorbachev lessened the threat of nuclear holocaust, Karl moved to the San Francisco Bay Area. In 1989 he collaborated with architect Carl Anthony, a long-time friend and colleague to found the Urban Habitat Program, initially sponsored by Earth Island Institute. Urban Habitat's mission was to develop multicultural environmental leadership and restore inner-city neighborhoods. Linn had previously inspired Anthony to coordinate the creation of a neighborhood commons in Harlem in 1963, and Anthony credits Linn with advocating for environmental justice two decades before the field had a name. Karl served on the boards of San Francisco League of Urban Gardeners and Berkeley Partners for Parks and on the steering committee of Berkeley's Community Gardening Collaborative. He helped found East Bay Urban Gardeners and the People of Color Greening Network.

Karl often spoke and wrote about the need to reclaim the commons and counter the ongoing privatization of public lands. He viewed the destruction of community gardens in New York City as the final enclosure of the commons. He believed strongly that guidelines to secure public land for community gardens should be incorporated in cities' general plans as was done in Seattle. He worked hard to include such guidelines in Berkeley's General Plan, convinced that through the creation and use of accessible community garden commons, neighborhood blocks can become arenas for a new kind of extended family living.

In 1993, for his 70th birthday, a community garden in north Berkeley was dedicated in his name to honor his lifelong service to community and peace. During the next two years Karl worked with volunteer wood artists, landscape architecture students, and AmeriCorps teams to revitalize the garden and add a handcrafted commons. With an overflowing wait list for plots in the refurbished Karl Linn Community Garden, he set his sights on a large weed-filled vacant lot across the street where the light rail tracks of the Bay Area Rapid Transit (BART) enter a tunnel. In 1995 he and City Council representative Linda Maio began to negotiate with BART for use of the land. Karl proceeded to coordinate the envisioning, planning, and construction of the Peralta and Northside Community Art Gardens, where ecological innovations and works of art intermingle with lush vegetation. The circular commons of the Peralta Garden, surrounded by a mosaic Snake Bench and colorful native California plants, is widely used for meetings, workshops, and special events by neighbors and organizations.

Karl was actively involved in a local Jewish-Palestinian dialog group, which used the Peralta Commons for some of their activities, including the planting of a peace pole and dedication of the garden as a peace park.

In 1999, Karl collaborated with community and environmental activists, city officials, and other supporters to establish Berkeley's EcoHouse, purchasing a small run-down residence adjacent to the Karl Linn Community Garden and transforming it into a model of affordable ecological technologies. EcoHouse is now a project of the Ecology Center.

The same year Karl conceptualized the transformation of the nearby section of the Ohlone Greenway into an interpretive exhibit of the natural and cultural history of the area. Artists, teachers, designers, engineers, and native plant restorationists worked tirelessly to develop and construct exhibits that evoke the Spanish ranchero period, the agricultural era, and the rich culture of the Ohlone people, who inhabited the area for at least 10,000 years. A 24-yard-long mural "From Elk Tracks to BART Tracks" depicts the history of the neighborhood from pre-settlement to the present, serving as an enormous picture book and inspiring passers-by to stop, reflect, and converse.

This cluster of commons projects contributes to the social and ecological vitality of the Westbrae neighborhood and is maintained and developed by the volunteer Friends of the Westbrae Commons.

== Criticism of Israel ==
Linn immigrated to Palestine in 1934, where he helped co-found a kibbutz and advocated for the creation of Israel. In 2002, Linn wrote that the exclusive, nationalist, and socialist nature of the Zionist movement reflected many of the attributes of Nazi Germany.

Israel's devastating military assaults against Palestinians, their dwellings and infrastructure, as occurred in the Jenin refugee camp, has inflamed the Arab world while desensitizing and hardening young Israeli soldiers, teaching them that violence and power are the final arbiters. Beyond the physical and emotional damage done to Palestinians, the erosion of humanity within Israeli society will have terrible repercussions on its form of government and its citizens.

Memories of a long history of persecution and victimization of Jews, and the unimaginable heinous crimes and genocide of six million Jews perpetrated by the National Socialist regime of Germany, compel many Israelis today to crave the power of self-protection. Israel's overbearing exercise of military might masks a longstanding sense of fear and frailty. The exaggerated striving and expression of power has degenerated to the extent that it resembles the worst excesses of power with which Jews have been assaulted. There are ample cases in history of a defeated people taking on the traits and behaviors of their oppressors. The sadistic humiliation, inhuman brutality, torture, and killing perpetrated on the Palestinians by Israeli soldiers is shocking and alarming. The news that numbers are being inked on the arms of Palestinian prisoners is chillingly reminiscent of the numbers branded on the arms of World-War-Il concentration camp inmates.

== Works ==
- Building Commons and Community (2007 Oakland: New Village Press) (published posthumously)
- "Reclaiming the Sacred Commons" (1999 New Village Journal, Issue 1)
- "Shattered Dreams in the Contested Holy Land" (2002 Nomi Yah Music)

== Documentation of Linn's life and work ==
In 2003 filmmaker Rick Bacigalupi released his hour-long documentary A Lot in Common chronicling the planning and construction of the Peralta Community Art Garden and Commons. The film, which includes commentary by Linn and by Paul Hawken, Ray Suarez, Jane Jacobs, Carl Anthony, and British scholar David Crouch, has aired on public television stations nationally in the United States, film festivals internationally, and Free Speech Television.

On February 3, 2005, Linn died at home of acute mylogenous leukemia. His widow, Nicole Milner, continues to support the local commons projects Linn inspired and the website, karllinn.org, which records his life and work and provides a forum for creators of commons to share their projects. Linn's oral history was recorded by the Bancroft Library at UC Berkeley, and his archives are housed at the UC Berkeley College of Environmental Design. Many of his projects are documented in his book Building Commons and Community (New Village Press, 2007).
