= Carl Anthony =

American architect (1939–2026)

Carl Anthony (February 8, 1939 – April 4, 2026) was an American social environmental justice leader, architect, regional planner, and author. He was the founding director of Urban Habitat which primarily focused on the environmental movement to confront issues of race and class structure. In addition, he was the founder and co-director of Breakthrough Communities, a project dedicated to building multiracial leadership for sustainable communities in California and the rest of the nation, and was the former President of the Earth Island Institute.

Carl Anthony was born in a predominantly African American neighborhood, Kingsessing, in Philadelphia, Pennsylvania. His parents, Lewis Anthony (born William Edwards) and Mildred Anthony (née Cokine), sent Carl and his older brother Lewie to B.B. Comegys, an integrated elementary school in which only about a dozen of the 300 students were African American, rather than the neighborhood school called Alexander Wilson, which was only a block away from their home. They later went on to attend Dobbins Vocational School, where Anthony was enrolled in the carpentry and cabinet-making shop. His teachers were impressed by his drawings and suggested that he transfer to the architectural drafting homeroom, where he fostered his interest in architecture.

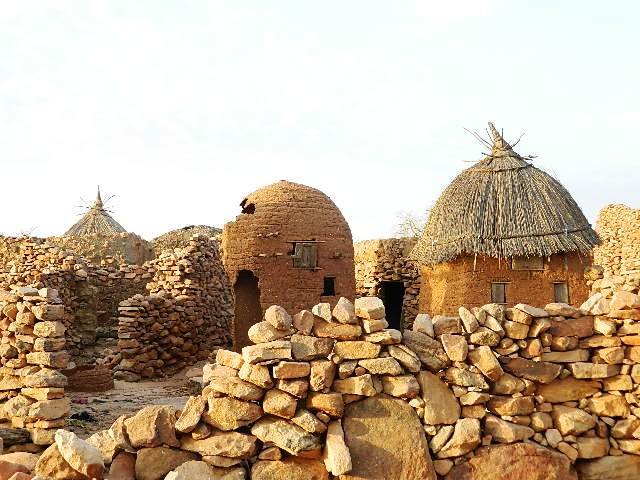
Carl Anthony studied and took inspiration from Dogon architecture in Africa.

== Education ==
Anthony received a professional degree in architecture at Columbia University in 1969 to gain an understanding of architecture and ways to implement projects. Upon his graduation, he was awarded the William Kinne Fellowship, a grant to enrich students' education through travel. Anthony visited traditional towns and villages in West Africa, studying the ways in which people utilized their few resources to shape their environments. He returned from Africa in 1971 where he was offered a position as an assistant professor at the University of California, Berkeley College of Natural Resources where he resided for ten years. After leaving Berkeley college, Anthony developed the Urban Habitat program.

== Urban Habitat (1989–2000) ==
Anthony served as President of Earth Island Institute from 1991 to 1998. In spring 1996, he was an appointed fellow at the Institute of Politics, housed within the John F. Kennedy School of Government, at Harvard University. Alongside his colleague Luke Cole at the California Rural Legal Assistance Foundation, Anthony founded and published the Race, Poverty, and the Environmental Journal, which was the United States’ first environmental justice periodical. In 1989, Anthony founded Earth Island Institute's Urban Habitat Program with David Brower and Karl Linn, the mission of which is to combine education with advocacy and coalition building to advance environmental and social justice in low-income communities in the Bay Area. He served as the initiative's Executive Director until 2000. Anthony directed various projects of Urban Habitat which worked to promote environmental leadership in communities consisting of primarily people of color to challenge environmental stability throughout the lens of race and poverty. Here are some examples:

California's Bay Area where Carl Anthony dedicated justice and sustainability movements

- Bay Area Justice and Sustainability Project: developed and promoted a regional agenda for justice and sustainability while addressing planning policies that lead to inner city abandonment.
- Leadership Institute for Sustainable Communities: leadership training program for land use policies and practices.
- Transportation and Environmental Justice Project: advocated for changing the priorities of the Metropolitan Transportation Commission (MTC) and the Bay Area Air Quality Management District toward addressing the transit needs of low-income communities of color.
- Brownfields Community Leadership Project: worked with leaders of low-income communities of color in the Bay Area to ensure Brownfields redevelopment addressed their needs.
- Hunter's Point Environmental Health Project: trained residents and community leaders in Bayview Hunter's Point in environmental health, justice issues, and laws. Partnership with the Southeast Alliance for Environmental Justice and Golden Gate University Environmental Law and Justice Clinic.
- Parks and Open Space for All People: worked toward revitalizing San Francisco Parks System by focusing on the needs of low-income communities of color, ensuring that a diverse range of people could have access to the parks.

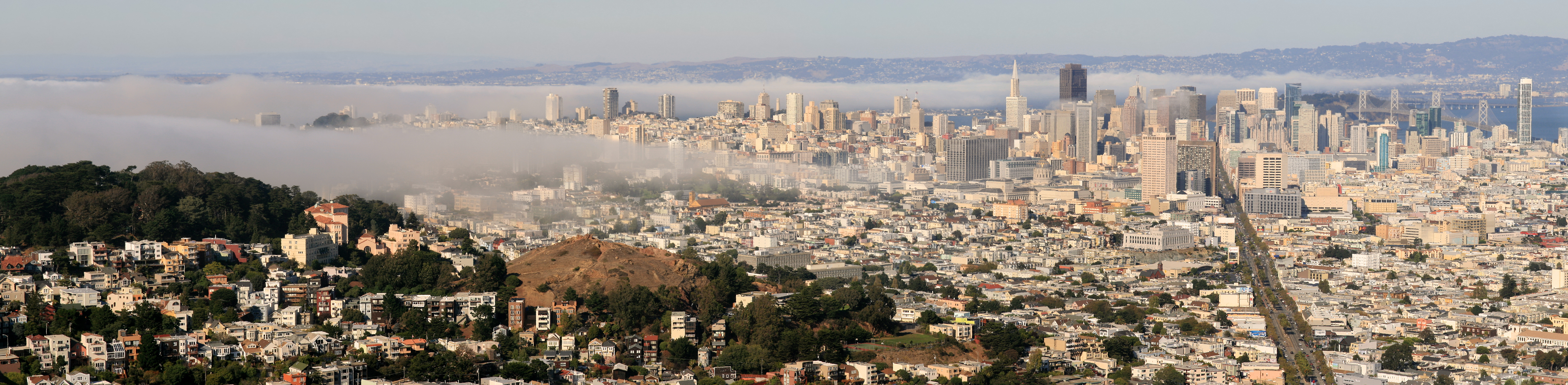
San Francisco, California where Anthony created open and safe spaces for everyone within the community

== Ford Foundation (2001–2008) ==
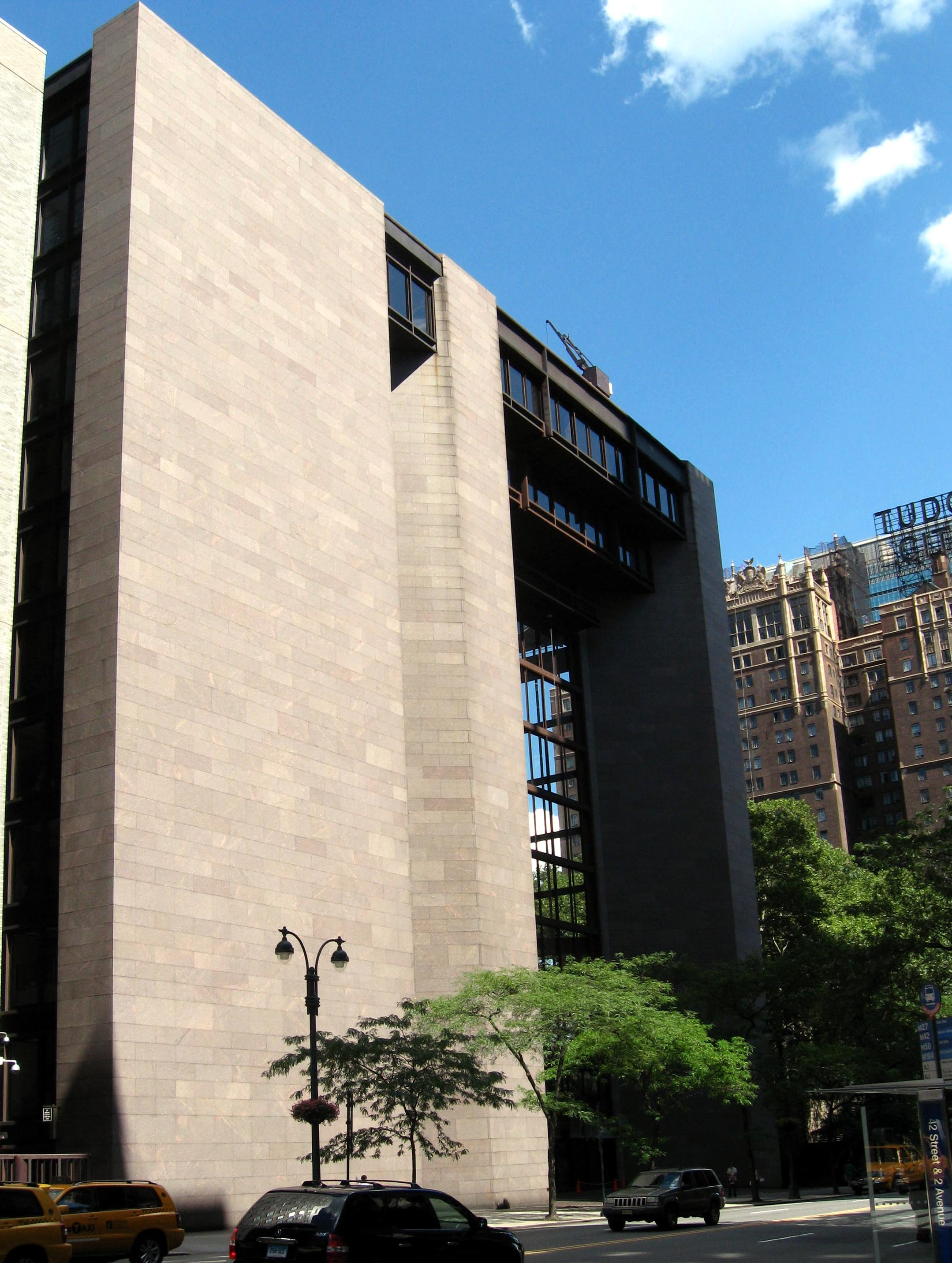
Ford Foundation Headquarters in New York where Carl Anthony spent time.

In 2001, Carl Anthony was selected to direct the Sustainable Metropolitan Communities Initiative (SMCI) which was a program created to give opportunity for disadvantaged communities. The Ford Foundation invested in community development corporations focusing primarily on predominantly lower-class African-American neighborhoods. Anthony worked to reduce patterns of concentrated poverty in the United States while promoting conservation of natural resources by creating strategies to connect guarantees in a collaborative environment and have a community-based national learning network. In 2004, Carl Anthony was appointed the director of Ford Foundation’s Community Resources Development Union but left in 2008.

== Breakthrough Communities (2008–) ==
In 2008, Anthony co-founded Breakthrough Communities, a project of Earth House Center, an advocacy nonprofit for regional equity and environmental and climate justice and served as the co-director. Anthony also founded Six Wins, an initiative in the Bay Area addressing the mitigation of carbon dioxide emissions.

== The Earth, the City, and the Hidden Narrative of Race (2017) ==
Anthony's memoir, The Earth, the City, and the Hidden Narrative of Race, is a mix of personal, historical, and political ideals. Anthony included personal experiences as an architect/planner, environmentalist, and Black American with urban history, racial justice, cosmology, and the challenge of healing the environment from past damages. The memoir includes personal stories from living in Philadelphia post World War 2, his time as a student and civil rights activist in the 1960s, being a traveling student of West African architecture and culture, and pioneering environmental justice advocacy. He also discusses his experiences during the Civil Rights movement and how he became focused on environmental movement and social justice. His main points of focus are on architecture, agriculture, black towns, and urban housing. The memoir also provides insight into his research on the African Slave trade, civil rights movement, environmental degradation, urban gentrification, and grassroots organizations.

== Boards, commissions, and awards ==
- 1991–1997: President, Earth Island Institute
- 1991–1993: President, City of Berkeley, Planning Commission
- 1993–1995: Founder, President, EDGE, Alliance of Ethnic and Environmental Organizations of California
- 1993–1996: Chair and Principal Administrative Officer, East Bay Conversion and Reinvestment Commission
- 1995: KQED, Honoree, Black History Month
- 1995: San Francisco Foundation, Humanitarian Award
- 1996: Fellow, John F. Kennedy School of Government, Harvard University
- 1996–1997: President, Board of Directors, Alameda Center for Environmental Technology
- 1997: Josephine and Frank Duveneck Humanitarian Award
- 1999–2001: Co-chair, Community Capital Initiative of the Bay Area Alliance for Sustainable Development
- 2014: Certificate of Special Congressional Recognition by Congresswoman Barbara Lee
- 2015: UC Davis Community Engagement Award
- 2015: Trailblazer Award from the Sierra Club

== Death ==
Anthony died in Berkeley on April 4, 2026 at the age of 87.
