= Arlene Goldbard =

American writer and activist

Arlene Goldbard is a writer, social activist, painter, and consultant whose focus is the intersection of culture, politics, and spirituality. She is an advocate for cultural democracy and a creator of cultural critique and new cultural policy proposals.

Goldbard was born in New York and grew up in the San Francisco Bay Area. After extended sojourns in Sacramento, Washington DC, Baltimore, Mendocino County, Seattle, and the San Francisco Bay Area, she now resides in Lamy, NM, with her husband, the sculptor Rick Yoshimoto.

== Work ==
She has addressed academic and community audiences in the U.S. and Europe, on topics ranging from the ethics of community arts practice to the development of integral organizations.

She was named one of 2015's "Fifty most powerful and influential leaders in the nonprofit arts." She was also named one of 50 Purpose Prize Fellows, recognizing social innovators over 60, for her role as Chief Policy Wonk of the U.S. Department of Arts and Culture.

She was a 2019 recipient of the Randy Martin Spirit Award from Imagining America, annually recognizing "individuals who embody the unique combination of qualities that made Dr. Randy Martin, Profesor of Art and Policy in the Tisch School of the Arts at New York University, a beloved and valued member of the IA community." In receiving the award, her presentation was entitled "In My Secret Life: (Nearly) Fifty Years in Pursuit of a New WPA," tracing her long-term advocacy for public service employment as a social good.

With François Matarasso, she cohosts "A Culture of Possibility", a podcast on community-based arts and cultural democracy.

She has also provided advice and counsel to community-based organizations, independent media groups, and public and private funders and policymakers. They include Appalshop, the Independent Television Service, the New Museum of Contemporary Art, the Rockefeller Foundation, the Paul Robeson Fund for Independent Media and the Tyler School of Art and Architecture.

== Notable positions ==
From 2013 to 2019, Goldbard served as Chief Policy Wonk of the U.S. Department of Arts and Culture, the nation's first and only people-powered department (the USDAC is not a government agency). She has served as Vice Chair of the Board of ALEPH: Alliance for Jewish Renewal, and Tsofah/President of Congregation Eitz Or in Seattle. From 2009-2019 she was President of the Board of Directors of The Shalom Center.

Additionally, she co-founded activist groups the San Francisco Artworkers' Coalition, the California Visual Artists Alliance, Bay Area Lawyers for the Arts and Draft Help.

== Publications ==
- Crossroads: Reflections on the Politics of Culture, Talmage, CA: DNA Press, 1990.
- Creative Community: The Art of Cultural Development, New York, NY: The Rockefeller Foundation, 2000.
- Community, Culture and Globalization, New York, NY: The Rockefeller Foundation, 2002.
- Clarity, iUniverse, 2004.
- New Creative Community: The Art of Cultural Development, Oakland, CA: New Village, 2006.
- The Culture of Possibility: Art, Artists & The Future, Waterlight, 2013.
- The Wave, Waterlight, 2013.
- In The Camp of Angels of Freedom: What Does It Mean to be Educated?, New York, NY; New Village Press] 2023
