= Illène Pevec =

American activist and author (born 1948)

Illène Pevec (born June 6, 1948) is an American author, journalist, children's activist, and educator who works in developing youth gardens at schools and community centers. Based in Carbondale, Colorado, Pevec serves as the program director for Fat City Farmers, a local food education program in Basalt, Colorado. She is a multinational citizen (Brazil, US, and Canada) and has developed youth gardens in all three countries. Pevec authored Growing a Life: Teen Gardeners Harvest Food, Health, and Joy (New Village Press 2016), a book that integrates her work in US community youth gardens with observations from other disciplines to generate a better understanding of the positive effects mentored urban gardening can have on youth development.

== Education ==
Pevec attended Stanford University from 1966-1969 but later graduated from Marylhurst University in 1993 with a bachelor's degree in Interdisciplinary Humanities. Pevec received her master's degree in Curriculum Studies from the University of British Columbia in 2000. In 2011, she received her doctoral degree in Design and Planning from the College of Architecture and Planning at the University of Colorado, Denver.

== School garden projects ==
=== Vancouver (1998–2002): Spirit of Nature Gardens ===
Spirit of Nature Gardens began as a research project to revitalize urban school grounds through school and community gardening. Pevec partnered with Tracy Penner to design and construct a garden that would serve inner city children as an outdoor learning environment for fine arts, gardening and cooking at the Grandview U'uqinak'uuh Community School in Vancouver. With help from students, parents, teachers, and community members, Pevec and Penner transformed one acre of underused land into a site for learning and community gatherings. The project won the "Creating Healthy Communities for Children and Youth" award from the Canadian Society for Children and Youth. Pevec also developed a curriculum for students to learn about the garden's plants, uses, and folklore.

=== Brazil (2001–2011): A Child's Garden of Peace ===
Pevec founded A Child's Garden of Peace in 2001 to provide organically grown produce, medicinal plants, and education in environmental responsibility to Brazilian communities. She worked with educators to develop community youth gardens in Santo Angelo, São Borja and Rocinha.

Pevec produced and co-edited a documentary about her work in Brazil entitled A Child's Garden of Peace (2005). The film toured international festivals from 2005–2006 and ran on PBS's award-winning Natural Heroes series.

== Fat City Farmers ==
Pevec is the program director at Fat City Farmers, a nonprofit organization founded in 2006 to improve personal and community health by supporting gardens and the local food system in Basalt, Colorado. Pevec coordinates garden education with regional schools in four counties and creates gardening curriculums for Colorado teachers in support of active learning. In 2014, she began an immigrant community garden at Roaring Fork High School for Spanish speaking immigrant families in partnership with Valley Settlement Project and Fat City Farmers.

== Books ==
- Cries in the Dark: Violence Prevention for Young People, 1995. Vancouver, Canada: Arts Umbrella.
- Arts and Multiculturalism, 1991. Vancouver, Canada: Arts Umbrella.
- Pevec, I., (2016). Growing a Life: Teen Gardeners Harvest Food, Health, and Joy. New York: New Village Press. In Growing a Life: Teen Gardeners Harvest Food, Health, and Joy (New Village Press, October 2016), Pevec interviews over 80 youth gardeners from Colorado, New York, New Mexico and California-based school gardening programs to investigate whether gardening affects at-risk teens' affective states and improves their ability to focus, their eating habits, and/or their environmental awareness.
