= Neighborhood commons =

A neighborhood commons is a shared community space where neighborhood residents can come together to celebrate life, and young and old can be in each other’s presence but not in each other’s way. It can be a small-scale, multi-use facility, combining a sitting area, tot lot, playground, park, and community garden, designed and constructed on one or more vacant lots by residents, volunteer professionals, and youth work teams.

The term "neighborhood commons" was first widely used by landscape architect, educator, and psychologist Karl Linn, who guided the creation of many such spaces during the 1960s through 1980s, primarily in the northeastern United States.

== Karl Linn and community design centers ==
While teaching at the University of Pennsylvania in 1960, Linn and his students began to provide landscape design service to the residents of low-income African-American and Latino neighborhoods, helping them acquire materials and the assistance of volunteer work teams to construct neighborhood commons. Linn recruited volunteer professionals such as artists, architects, landscape architects, social scientists, and lawyers to add their skills to the projects and mentor the students. The neighborhood commons were built as celebrations of community in the spirit of "urban barnraising." The students formed a Design Corps that served as a model for the Domestic Peace Corps (VISTA). In 1961, with growing demand for their service, Linn established the Neighborhood Renewal Corps Nonprofit Corporation of Philadelphia, a community design center in landscape architecture.

In 1962 he created a similar organization in Washington, D.C. One of their first projects was a "land bank" survey to identify vacant lots with the potential to become neighborhood commons. For the next 25 years while teaching at prominent colleges and universities, Linn guided or inspired into being numerous neighborhood commons. He worked hard to secure municipal support for these environmental self-help projects. In Philadelphia the work of the Neighborhood Renewal Corps received a lot of support and was gradually taken over by the city's Land Utilization Program. Unfortunately the focus shifted from involving residents in creating neighborhood commons to city crews constructing "vest-pocket parks." These parks, although much admired by design critics, were not perceived as belonging to the community and were frequently subjected to graffiti and vandalism.

Linn envisioned a neighborhood commons in every residential block as the physical framework for the development of a new kind of extended-family living based on mutual aid among neighbors and intergenerational support. Later in his career he observed that neighborhood commons in community gardens were most likely to be used and cared for since the gardeners go there regularly to attend to their plots. Many of these projects are described in Building Commons and Community by Karl Linn, published by New Village Press in 2007.
