= Spoon Jackson =

American poet

Stanley Russell "Spoon" Jackson (born August 22, 1957 in Barstow, California) is an American prisoner and poet serving a life without the possibility of parole sentence. Currently incarcerated at California State Prison, Solano. Jackson was convicted of the stabbing homicide of Denise Holzman, 23, in Barstow, California. Holzman, the first female switch operator for the Santa Fe Railroad, moved to Barstow five weeks prior to the murder. Jackson was incarcerated in 1977 and has served time in more than six California state prisons.

== Biography ==
Spoon began writing poetry during his years at San Quentin State Prison in the 1980s. He enrolled in a four-year poetry workshop run by Judith Tannenbaum and discovered himself as a writer. Spoon played Pozzo in the 1988 production of Samuel Beckett's play Waiting for Godot directed by Jan Jonson which brought him international attention. A short documentary, Waiting for Godot in San Quentin, was produced about the making of the play by Global Village for The Beckett Project, directed by John Reilly and Melissa Shaw-Smith. Spoon served over 12 years in California State Prison, Sacramento (New Folsom), where he was active as a teacher's aid and later had his own writing classes in the Arts In Corrections programs. Since then, Spoon has written plays, poetry, novels, fairy tales, short stories, essays, memoir and he frequently writes articles for magazines. Along with friends from Sweden, Spoon started the "Peace Gang" in order to spread and share his poetry. In October 2016, Spoon took part in a 15-week creative writing classes in a maximum-security yard at California State Prison, Los Angeles (Lancaster), run by Los Angeles Poet Laureate and renown author Luis J. Rodriguez.

In 2003, Michel Wenzer produced a documentary in Sweden entitled Three Poems by Spoon Jackson. The film included recordings of Spoon reciting his poems, taped from telephone calls. Michel Wenzer completed a full-length documentary (2011) about prisoners in the Art in Corrections program at New Folsom Prison: At Night I Fly. The title comes from one of Jackson's poems, he also features in the film. At Night I Fly won the Swedish Guldbagge Film Award for best documentary of the year 2011. A documentary titled Spoon, by Michka Saäl, premiered in 2015. In the documentary Barstow, California (2018) by German director Rainer Komers, Spoon's poems and excerpts from his memoir By heart were used as voice overs.

"Words of Realness", a suite for chorus and orchestra by Swedish composer Stefan Säfsten based on Jackson's poems, premiered on October 5, 2008 in Kista, Stockholm.

More recent music productions are the album The Prison Music Project (2015), produced by Zoe Boekbinder and Ani DiFranco, and Die Jim Crow (2016) produced by Fury Young, and the choir song No One Knows by Joséphine Maillefer on the album Inmates' Voices choir (2014).

== Awards ==
Jackson has won four awards from PEN American Center Prison Writing Program.

== Publications ==
- By Heart: Poetry, Prison and Two Lives. New Village Press, 2010. A two-person memoir written by Judith Tannenbaum and Jackson.
- Longer Ago: Poems by Spoon Jackson. 2010.
- Bo Osdrowski/Tom Riebe (Ed.): Spoon Jackson. Versensporn - Heft für lyrische Reize Nr. 11, Edition POESIE SCHMECKT GUT, Jena 2013, (including a DVD with a short film by Michel Wenzer Three Poems by Spoon Jackson).
- Too Cruel Not Unusual Enough. 2013. Anthology
- Philosophers Imprisoned. 2015. Anthology
- Felsentauben erwachen auf Zellenblock 8. 2017. Poems translated to German by Rainer Komers, edited by Jürgen Brôcan.
- The Book of Judith: Opening Hearts Through Poetry. New Village Press, September 2022.
