= Alfredo Cardona Peña =

Alfredo Cardona Peña (11 August 1917 – 31 January 1995) was a celebrated journalist, writer, biographer poet and essayist born in San José, Costa Rica. Cardona Peña lived and wrote for most of his career in Mexico, where he worked in comics for the publisher Novaro, and became "a singular figure in the history of Mexican science fiction."

== Career ==
Cardona began publishing short stories in 1944 in various genres from fairy tales to horror and science fiction, known for a style of humor and sharp irony. Best known for his poetry, he received awards in Guatemala, Costa Rica and in the US. In 1945, he became a teacher of Spanish Language Literature at the National University of Mexico. From 1969 through 1980 he served as the editor-in-chief of the comic-books section of the celebrated Novaro Publishing House.

== Published works ==
- El mundo que tú eres (México, 1944)
- Valle de México (México, 1949)
- Poemas numerales (Guatemala, 1950)
- Bodas de tierra y mar (México, 1950), Los jardines amantes (México, 1952)
- Primer paraíso (México, 1955)
- Poema nuevo (México, 1955)
- Poesía de pie (México, 1959)
- Mínimo estar (México, 1959)
- Oración futura (México, 1959)
- Poema de la juventud (México, 1960)
- Poema del retorno (México, 1960)
- Lectura de mi noche (San José, 1963)
- Cosecha mayor: 1944-1964 (San José, 1964)
- Confín de llamas (México, 1969)
- Asamblea plenaria (México, 1976)
- Anillos en el tiempo (San José, 1980)
- Viñetas terminales (México, 1987)
- Conversations with Diego Rivera: The Monster in His Labyrinth translated by Alvaro Cardona-Hine (United States, New Village Press, 2018)

== Awards ==
- National Poetry Award (1962).
- Central American Poetry Award in Guatemala (1948).
- Continental Poetry Award from the American Atheneum of Washington (1951).
- National Prize for Poetry in Costa Rica (1961).
- Magón Culture Award (1985), the highest honor given in Costa Rica for lifetime achievement.
- Alfonso Reyes Award for Short Story (1983).
- A posthumous tribute at the fourth National Convention of the Mexican Association of Science Fiction and Fantasy (1996).
