= Disability publications in the United States =

There are a various publications in the United States written by and/or for people with disabilities.

== Background ==
In the United States in the early 20th century, having a disabling condition was often a source of social stigma, and people with disabilities were excluded from many parts of U.S. society, including participation in the creation of popular culture via creative writing or reportage. People with disabilities had no control over their depiction in media run by, and catering to, the non-disabled majority, and were generally represented by inaccurate and negative stereotypes, including well-meaning but patronizing characterizations. This inability to speak for themselves, particularly on public policy issues directly affecting them, motivated different groups representing people with particular disabilities to begin their own publications.

== The Deaf community ==
The North Carolina School for the Deaf began the first publication for deaf people in 1848 with its school newspaper, The Deaf Mute. The American Deaf community is tied together not only by lack of hearing, but also by the linguistic tradition of American Sign Language, which they identify as forging their Deaf culture.

Deafness-related publications started when states began building residential schools for deaf children in the mid-19th century. These schools used sign language to teach and employed many deaf teachers. These schools thus became a conduit for the transmission of deaf culture to deaf children, and newspapers were established at these schools to help cement their community. After the North Carolina school, many others followed suit, and became known as The Little Paper family. Histories of American Schools for the Deaf reports that in 1893 that there were 50 of these residential school newspapers, and they exchanged stories and items of interest, providing a cultural forum for the deaf community to discuss important political events affecting the community, as well as small news events.

== The blind community ==
In terms of physical accessibility to news, the blind community was at the forefront of disability publications, with a growing number of publications in the early 20th century. In 1907, the Matilda Ziegler Magazine for the Blind was founded to give people without sight access to selected articles from print periodicals. Known as the Ziegler, This general-interest magazine was originally published both in braille and New York Point, an embossed writing system no longer in use. The magazine's founder, Matilda Ziegler, was the mother of a blind son and an heiress who solely funded the publication. Her endowment continues to provide free distribution of the magazine.

The Braille Book Review began in 1938 and described the newest books in Braille from the National Library Service for the Blind. Once sound technology was more prevalent, Talking Book Topics was founded in the 1930s to provide information for the blind community about the most recent recorded books at the National Library.

Choice Magazine Listening, founded in 1962 by the nonprofit Lucerna Fund, provides a free audio magazine anthology to anyone in the U.S. who is blind, visually impaired or physically disabled. Each quarterly issue contains 12 hours of articles, short stories, essays and poems, chosen from over 100 publications, and read unabridged by professional narrators.

== Disability specific publications ==
Other disability-related publications cater for the various different subcultures of the disability community. In 1946, following World War II, the Paralyzed Veterans of America developed the magazine Paraplegia News, for soldiers who had been disabled in war. Many disability publications target other specific audiences, such as people with a specific disability, parents of disabled people, or health care professionals.

== Disability rights activism ==
Other disability publications, such as The Ragged Edge, Mainstream, and Mouth, were focused overtly on disability rights activism, and helped promote the disability community's civil rights agenda. The American Disability rights movement began in the mid-to-late 1970s. After the Rehabilitation Act was passed in the 1970s but not given entitlements, the disability community began a campaign of protests and activism. Publications grew from these activities such as Mainstream magazine in 1975 and The Disability Rag in 1980 (renamed The Ragged Edge in 1997). Mouth began in 1990 after its founder Lucy Gwin "escaped from what amounted to a nursing home." Mouth was originally focused on people with neurological impairments but evolved into a general all-disability rights advocacy publication.

Douglas Lathrop wrote in the Society of Professional Journalists The Quill that these rights-based publications emerged because many in the disability community were tired of persistent negative media stereotypes of people with disabilities as inspirational or courageous in the mainstream news media. "In light of this persistent reliance on oppressive stereotypes, the disability press fills the void," Lathrop said. Lucy Gwin, the editor of Mouth, explained in The Quill: "Nobody (in the nondisabled media) is going to cover the disability-rights movement, so we're just going to have to cover it our own damn selves."

== Sources ==
- Edward A. Fay, ed., Histories of American Schools for the Deaf, 1817-1893. (Washington, D.C.: Volta Bureau, 1893).
- Erving Goffman, Stigma. (Englewood Cliffs, N.J.: Prentice-Hall, 1963): 23.
- Beth Haller, "The Little Papers Newspapers at 19th Century Schools for Deaf Persons" 19 Journalism History, (Summer 1993): 46–47.
- Jeffrey Alan John, "Indications of disability culture in magazines marketed to the disability community" 18 Disability Studies Quarterly (Winter 1998): 25
- Douglas Lathrop, "Challenging perceptions, " Quill, July/August 1995, 37.
- MadNation, http://www.madnation.org/mouth.htm.
- Carmen Manning-Miller, The disability press: A descriptive study (Paper presented at the Association for Education in Journalism and Mass Communication annual meeting, Kansas City, Mo., 1993): 14–15.
- Lillie Ransom, Disability Magazine and Newsletter Editors: Perceptions of the Disability Press, Community, Advocacy, Mainstreaming and Diversity (Ph.D. dissertation, University of Maryland, College Park, Md., 1996): 136–38.
- John Van Cleve and Barry Crouch, A Place of Their Own. (Washington, D.C.: Gallaudet University Press, 1989): 60.
- Charlie Winston, America's Telability Media (Columbia, Mo.: National Telability Media Center, 1995): 38, 18.
