= Women Artists Visibility Event =

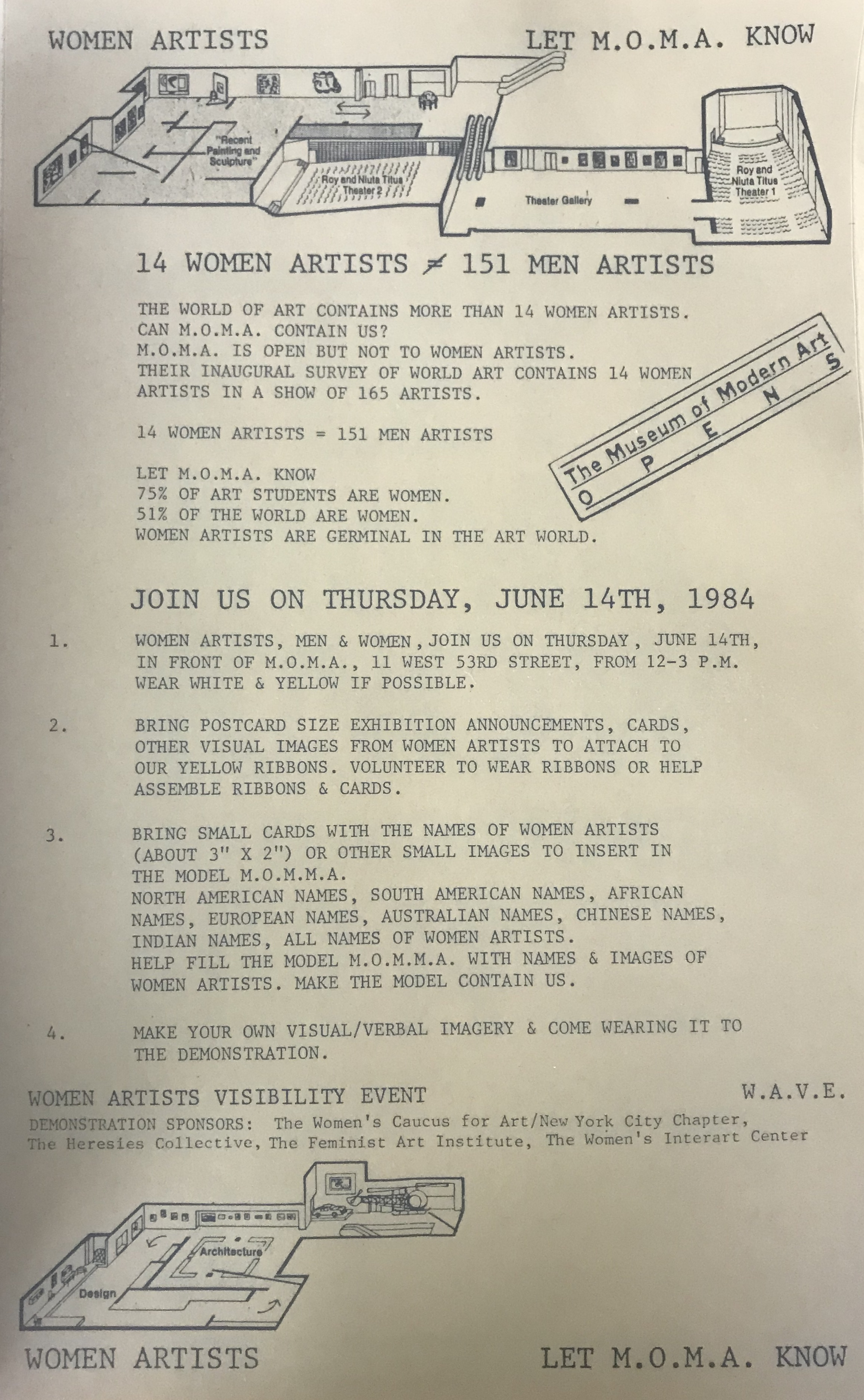
- Flier for the Women Artists Visibility Event (W.A.V.E) or "Let MOMA Know" demonstration
- Date: June 14, 1984

The Women's Artists Visibility Event (W.A.V.E.) also known as Let MOMA Know, was a demonstration held on June 14, 1984, to protest the lack of women represented in The Museum of Modern Art's re-opening exhibition "An International Survey of Recent Painting and Sculpture." The exhibition featured 164 artists, only 14 of which were women. The event kicked off similar protests across the United States in later years.

== Event ==
The event's acronym, W.A.V.E., is a nod to Flag Day, which is observed on June 14 in the United States. 400 demonstrators, wearing suffragette yellow and white, marched in front the entrance to MoMA's newly expanded 53rd street building; a well received renovation that doubled its gallery space and increased traffic to the museum. Demonstrators had three demands: that MoMA exhibit works by women artists from their permanent collection, that it display women's work in loaned exhibitions, and that it create a policy to acquire women's work in the future. The Women's Caucus for Art (WCA) created pins to parody MoMA's "Museum of Modern Art OPENS" staff badges, upon which they included the addition "But Not to Women Artists." Cards were distributed listing the names of 100 well known female artists who were not featured in the exhibit, including Alice Neel, Louise Nevelson, Jaune Quick-to-See Smith, Faith Ringgold and Louise Bourgeois.

One spokesperson for the museum, Louisa Kreisberg, noted that a film series in the exhibition featured four women of the six films shown, and that the staff at the museum was roughly 65% female.

== Organizers ==
The event was organized by the New York chapter of the WCA, and supported by three additional feminist arts organizations; The Heresies Collective, Women's Interart Center, and New York Feminist Art Institute. Individual organizers for the event were artists Sabra Moore, and Betsy Damon and curator and President of WCA New York, Annie Shaver-Crandell.
