= Annie Lanzillotto =

American musician and writer

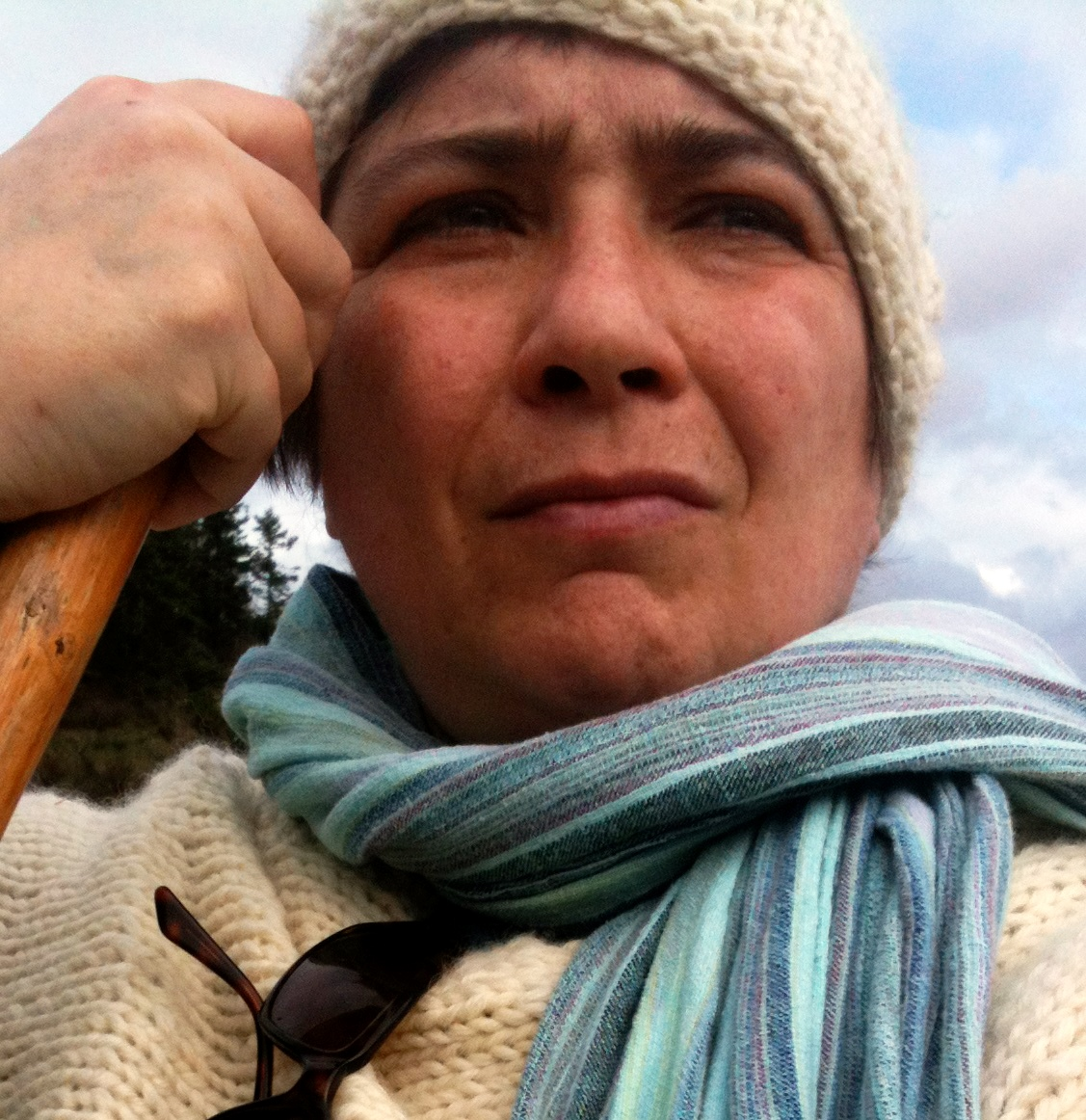
- Lanzillotto in 2012
- Born: June 1, 1963 (age 63); Bronx, New York, United States
- Occupations: Author, performance artist, poet, song writer, teacher
- Writing career
- Period: 1990s ---
- Notable works: Grandma Nunzio in Tony n' Tina's Wedding Times Square (2013). L Is for Lion: An Italian Bronx Butch Freedom Memoir, Schistsong, a'Schapett at The Arthur Avenue Retail Market, How To Wake Up a Marine in a Foxhole, and The Flat Earth: Wheredafffhuck Did New York Go?
- Website: annielanzillotto.com

Annie Lanzillotto (born June 1, 1963) is an American author, poet, songwriter, director, actor, podcaster, and performance artist.

Her book, L Is for Lion: An Italian Bronx Butch Freedom Memoir, was published by State University of New York Press. 2013. Her book of poetry, Schistsong was published by Bordighera Press. 2013. Her double flip book of poetry and prose, Hard Candy: Caregiving, Mourning, and Stage Light and Pitch Roll Yaw was published by Guernica Editions 2018. Her podcast Annie's Story Cave commenced while sheltering in place alone in 2020. She is the Artistic Director of Street Cry Inc.

Lanzillotto is a member of Actors' Equity, Dramatists Guild of America, PEN America, Remember the Triangle Fire Coalition, Malìa: a Collective of Italian American Women, The Italian American Writers Association (IAWA), a blogger for i-Italy.com, and has been a Writer-in-Residence at Hedgebrook, Santa Fe Art Institute and New Jersey City University.

Lanzillotto has shared her history for the Sophia Smith Collection at Smith College's Documenting Lesbian Lives Oral History Project. She has taught Solo-Theater at The Actor's Theatre of Louisville.

== Early years ==
Annie Lanzillotto was born in the Bronx, New York. She is the fourth of four children. She is a third generation Italian American whose grandparents came from the Bari province of Italy; Acquaviva delle Fonti, Cassano delle Murge, and Bitetto. Her father, Joseph Rocco Lanzillotto was an iceman, boiler repairman, and U.S. Marine who fought in World War II in the Battle of Okinawa. Her mother, Rachel Claire Petruzzelli Lanzillotto was a hairdresser and manicurist. Her father suffered from PTSD. After her parents' vicious divorce when she was twelve, Lanzillotto's mother raised her alone on welfare.

Lanzillotto and her mother moved to Yonkers, New York, where Sister Raymond Aloysis trained and coached her into becoming an oratorical champion. She won the National Catholic Forensic League's New York State Championship in 1977. Lanzillotto attended Roosevelt High School in Yonkers, where she began to create performance art during her pledges to the sorority Sigma Phi Nu. She can be heard on iTunes talking about her early years through StoryCorps.

Lanzillotto was influenced by punk rock and Joan Jett. She graduated from Brown University with a Bachelor of Arts with honors in Medical Anthropology. As a freshman at Brown University in 1981, she was diagnosed with Hodgkin's Disease and in 1982, created the Group Independent Study Project, "Everything You Always Wanted To Know About Cancer But Were Afraid To Ask." This project was funded with "Odyssey Grants" in education for three years. Lanzillotto developed the curriculum with Dr. Stephanie LaFarge and Dr. James Crowley of Rhode Island Hospital.

She studied at The American University in Cairo, Egypt, where she cross-dressed in order to complete her fieldwork of Schistosomiasis unfettered. In 1986, Lanzillotto received the Eva A. Mooar Award for the graduating Brown University female senior who had the most impact on the community. During her university years, Lanzillotto took flying lessons and earned a private pilot's licence.

Lanzillotto studied writing in New York City with her mentor Denya Cascio. She continued her studies at Sarah Lawrence College where Lanzillotto studied fiction writing with Joseph Papaleo, poetry with Joan Larkin and theater with Shirley Kaplan. Lanzillotto taught at Sing Sing, Bedford Hills Correctional Facility for Women, and Bayview Correctional Facilities through Mercy College Extension Programs, and in Harlem and Brooklyn through The New York City Ballet Education Department. She graduated with a Master of Fine Arts in Fiction Writing from Sarah Lawrence College in 1990 and delivered the commencement speech, taking on the character of Sarah Lawrence herself.

== Career ==
Lanzillotto moved to New York City in 1987. Early influences were downtown performance artists Mark Ameen and Penny Arcade. Lanzillotto was a member of AIDS Coalition to Unleash Power (ACT-UP). In 1993, she developed a literacy program at Housing Works, where she met theater director Victoria MacElwayne who directed Lanzillotto's first solo show, Confessions of a Bronx Tomboy: My Throwing Arm (This Useless Expertise) which debuted at Manhattan Class Company MCC Theater's Performance Mix and Under One Roof Theater with live sound action by Eliza Ladd.

Lanzillotto's practice "Action Writing," brought writing into the public sphere as performance on oversized scrolls of paper on which she would write to live music and perform improvised recitations of the text. She performed poetry and one-woman shows at: Pyramid Club, Dixon Place, The Kitchen, Performance Space 122 Avant-Garde-Arama, The Knitting Factory, Smalls Jazz Club, Revolution Books, The Solomon R. Guggenheim Museum, Worker's United 99th and 100th Triangle Fire Memorial, Remember the Triangle Factory Fire Coalition's 99th memorial at Judson Memorial Church. Lanzillotto's vision of 146 Shirtwaist-Kites became a community art project memorializing the victims of the Triangle Shirtwaist Factory Fire.

From November 1995 until November 1997, Annie Lanzillotto created a site-specific community-based performance-art project, "a'Schapett!" at The Arthur Avenue Retail Market Project, in a once thriving Italian neighborhood in the Bronx. This was a site-specific community-based performance project where Lanzillotto brought artists into the market during business hours. She directed live scenarios both scripted and improvised, with local senior citizens, merchants and a variety of visiting opera singers, trapeze artists, musicians, dancers, and performance artists. The project came out of Annie's obsession of the vocality of pushcart peddlers. The project was commissioned by Dancing in the Streets, funded by Rockefeller Foundation Multi Arts Production Grant. Lanzillotto has since written about this work in New Village Press's Works of HeART. Her work was created to bridge the downtown avant-garde performance scene of New York City with the working class labor of butchers and bakers. Her community-based performance work at Arthur Avenue is featured in Molly O'Neill's film New York: A Taste of the City.

Seminal to her political development was the Rockefeller Foundation Next Generation Leadership Program in which she was a fellow in 2000.

In 2008, she wrote and performed in The Flat Earth: "WheredaFFFhuck Did New York Go?"

Lanzillotto performed songs and stories at the first Gay Pride event at Hoboken Public Library.

In 2013, her site-specific "Blue Mailbox Book Crawl" took the audience on a processional walk around the East Village where Lanzillotto sat atop blue corner mailboxes and told stories from her book L is for Lion. This work was supported by Franklin Furnace and City Lore. Later that year Lanzillotto played Grandma Nunzio in Tony n' Tina's Wedding in Times Square, directed by Tony Lauria, and produced by Joe Corcoran. Lanzillotto's approach of performance was described as "She's not acting. She's living.",

== Personal life ==
Lanzillotto is a lesbian who had a 16-year relationship with choreographer/artist Audrey Kindred, then became a full-time caregiver to her hairdresser/manicurist mother Rachel Lanzillotto. Annie Lanzillotto survived Hodgkin's Lymphoma and thyroid cancer and has been a patient at Memorial Sloan-Kettering Cancer Center in New York City since she was 18 years old.

== Awards, grants, and honors ==
- 1986 Eva A. Mooar Award for the graduating Brown University female senior who had the most impact on the community and city of Providence, Rhode Island 1986.
- 1999 New York Foundation for the Arts Fellowship in Multi-Disciplinary Performance
- 1996 Puffin Foundation Grant
- 1996 Dancing In The StreetsOn/Site NYC Commission
- 2004–present, Marquis Who's Who in American Women.
- 2006 Rockefeller Foundation Next Generation Leadership Program grant administered through New York University Research Center for Leadership in Action.
- 2012 2nd Place John and Rose Petracca & Family Award in Poetry from Philadelphia Poets.
- 2012 Franklin Furnace Archive Inc. Performance Commission
- 2014 26th Lambda Literary Awards Finalist
- 2014 New York Foundation for the Arts Fellowship in Non-Fiction

== Works ==
=== Books ===
- Hard Candy: Caregiving, Mourning, and Stage Light, and Pitch Roll Yaw, Guernica World Editions, 2018.
- Schistsong, Bordighera Press, 2013. Poetry
- L is For Lion: An Italian Bronx Butch Freedom Memoir, SUNY Albany Press, 2013.

=== Essays ===
- An Artist Journeys Home, in Works of HeART: Building Village Through the Arts, edited by Lynne Elizabeth and Susanne Young, New Village Press, 2006.
- Wallid Walla Bint, in Politics of Water: A Confluence of Women's Voices, International Feminist Journal of Politics, Issue 9.4, Guest Editor: Paola Corso and Nandita Ghosh. Centre for International and Security Studies, Toronto Ontario, Canada, York University, 2007.
- Cosa Mangia Oggi, in Gastropolis: Food and New York City, Columbia University Press, ed. by Annie Hauck-Lawson, Jonathan Deutsch, 2007

=== Discography ===
- Eleven Recitations, StreetCry Productions, 2009.
- Blue Pill, Annie Lanzillotto Band, StreetCry Productions, recorded at The Loft, Bronxville, NY, 2010.
- Carry My Coffee, with Lori Goldston on cello. 2011.
- Swampjuice: Yankee With a Southern Peasant Soul, Annie Lanzillotto and Washbucket Blues, with Al Hemberger on guitars and bass, JT Lewis on drums, Rose Imperato on Tenor Sax and Flute, Bobby LaSardo on Blues Harp and Tenor Sax. Recorded at The Loft, Bronxville, New York 2016.
- Never Argue With a Jackass, Annie Lanzillotto, with Al Hemberger on bass and production, Pasquale Cangiano on pocket trumpet. Recorded at The Loft, Bronxville, New York 2018.
