= Judith Tannenbaum =

American teaching artist and writer (1947–2019)

Judith Tannenbaum (February 13, 1947 – December 5, 2019) was an American teaching artist and writer. Born in Chicago and raised in Los Angeles, she had a strong commitment to prisoners and prison issues. Tannenbaum worked in the field of community-based arts, sharing poetry in a wide variety of settings from primary school classrooms to maximum security prisons. Throughout her career she taught in prisons across the country, spoke on panels and at conferences on prison and prison arts.

== Life and career ==
Through the program California Poets in the Schools, Tannenbaum taught poetry in public schools all over California. She also designed and taught a poetry intensive for gifted teen-agers at UC Berkeley for nine summers.

In 1985 Tannenbaum began teaching at San Quentin with Arts in Corrections, a partnership between the California Department of Corrections and Rehabilitation (CDCR) and the California Arts Council. The program is designed to promote interpersonal and social transformation with people experiencing incarceration though instruction in visual; literary; media; performing; and cultural, folk and traditional arts. After a year of teaching only one night a week, Tannenbaum received a grant allowing her to teach nearly full time and offer more classes to a wider range of students under different levels of security. Through her four years at San Quentin, she worked with inmates, prison administrators, staff, and guards.

Tannenbaum created Arts-in-Corrections’ newsletter, wrote their book-length Manual for Artists Working in Prison, and developed the Handbook for Arts in the Youth Authority Program at the California Division of Juvenile Justice. She has also completed a feasibility study for arts programming in Minnesota state prisons; chaired panels and served as keynote speaker at conferences on prison, prison arts, and teaching arts; and taught in prisons in eight states.

She later received two three-year Artist in Residency grants from the California Arts Council for her work at San Quentin and at a continuation high school and primary school in Albany, California.

Tannenbaum retired from San Francisco youth arts program WritersCorps in 2014 after 20 years serving as training coordinator.

She is the subject of the 2024 book Judith Letting Go: Six Months in the World's Smallest Death Cafe by Mark Dowie (New Village Press).

== Books and work ==
Among Tannenbaum’s books are the memoir, Disguised as a Poem: My Years Teaching Poetry at San Quentin (Northeastern University Press, 2000) -- a finalist in PEN American Center USA West’s Literary Award Winners in 2001; two books for teachers – Teeth, Wiggly as Earthquakes: Writing Poetry in the Primary Grades (Stenhouse Publishers, 2000) and (with Valerie Chow Bush) Jump Write In! Creative Writing Exercises for Diverse Communities, Grades 6-12 (Jossey-Bass, 2005); and six poetry collections. Her By Heart: Poetry, Prison, and Two Lives — co-written with Spoon Jackson, her student at San Quentin in the 1980s — was published by New Village Press in March 2010. The Book of Judith - edited by Spoon Jackson - was published by New Village Press in September 2022.
