= Beverly Naidus =

American artist

Beverly Naidus (born 1953) is an American artist, author and current faculty member of University of Washington Tacoma. She is the author of several artist books including One Size Does Not Fit All (1993) and What Kinda Name is That? (1996) which has been discussed by academics in the field including Paul Von Blum, Lucy R. Lippard and reviewed by contemporary journals. She has received multiple grants including the Massachusetts Cultural Council Artist's Grant in Photography (2001) to fund her art creations and teaching. She was also a finalist in the Andy Warhol Foundation and Creative Capital's Art Writers Grant Program (2007). Her most recent book Arts for Change: Teaching Outside the Frame (2009) is her personal pedagogy on teaching and creating socially engaged art. She also provides suggestions on engaging students in what is most important to them.

== Life and career ==
Born in Salem, Massachusetts, Naidus grew up in Massachusetts, Maine and New Jersey. She completed her undergraduate degree in Studio Arts at Carleton College in 1975, followed by a Master of Fine Arts degree in InterMedia Art from Nova Scotia College of Art and Design, Canada in 1978. Gaining recognition in New York City, Naidus has presented artwork across a wide platform, in the community, including city streets, subways and buses. For example, her artwork in "Subculture", curated by Group Material, was presented in the IRT Subways, NYC in 1983. Another piece "Not for Sale II", curated by PADD, was presented at the Lower East Side Streets, NYC in 1984. Her piece This is not a test, was in the exhibition The End of the World: Contemporary Visions of the Apocalypse at the New Museum in 1983-1984

Naidus' teaching career started during her fellowship program at the Nova Scotia College of Art and Design. After being an educator at several museums in New York including the Jewish Museum, Guggenheim Museum, Metropolitan Museum of Art and the Museum of Modern Art, she is currently a faculty member of the University of Washington, Tacoma and has created an interdisciplinary curriculum in art for social change and healing.

== Topics of interest ==
Naidus is especially focused on environmental crises that create problems for humans. Her works address social issues such as racism, consumerism, body image, nuclear threats, cultural identity etc.

One of her recent art projects, Eden Reframed, is an ecological and community art project on Vashon Island near Seattle, WA.

== Selected works ==
- Arts for Change: Teaching Outside the Frame. Oakland, CA: New Village, 2009.
- What Kind of Name is That? A Bookwork. Venice, CA: Beverly Naidus, 1995.
- One Size Does Not Fit All. Littleton, CO: Aigis, 1993.
