= Nadina LaSpina =

Nadina LaSpina is an Italian-American disability rights activist, teacher, and author. Active in the disability rights movement for 40 years, she is known for her work with Disabled in Action, ADAPT, The Disability Caucus, and other groups. Her first book, Such a Pretty Girl: A Story of Struggle, Empowerment, and Disability Pride, is a memoir about her life and activism. She lives in New York City.

== Early life ==
LaSpina was born in a fishing village Riposto in Sicily. As a young child she contracted polio, which left her without the use of her legs. Throughout her childhood she was the subject of constant pity, friends and neighbors would call her "such a pretty girl" with the implication that it was a shame that such an attractive child was disabled. At the age of 13 she moved with her parents to the United States in the hopes of finding a cure and spent much of her adolescence in and out of hospitals. She attended St. John's University in Jamaica, Queens, and received a master's degree in Italian from New York University.

== Career and advocacy ==
LaSpina taught Italian at New York University, Fordham University, and The New School, where she also taught in the pioneering field of disability studies.

LaSpina has been involved with many protests and movements. She has mobilized for disabled parking and public transportation access in New York City and was involved in the fight for Section 504 of the Rehabilitation Act of 1973, which prohibits discrimination against people with disabilities in programs that receive federal financial assistance, the first disability civil rights law to be enacted in the United States. LaSpina was later an important figure in the struggle to pass the Americans with Disabilities Act of 1990. As a result of her activism, LaSpina has been arrested over 50 times for civil disobedience.

LaSpina spoke at the 2018 Women's March in New York City, where she discussed experience with sexual abuse while in the hospital and the prevalence of sexual abuse in women with disabilities. She was the Grand Marshall of the 2019 Disability Pride Parade in New York City.

In her writing, LaSpina refutes stereotypical narratives of disability, she shows how harmful the overwhelming focus on pity and on an elusive cure can be for those with disabilities.

== Writing ==
LaSpina's articles, essays, and stories have appeared in publications as varied as AbleNews and Ragged Edge, New Politics, And Then, and Bookwoman.

Her first book, Such a Pretty Girl: A Story of Struggle, Empowerment, and Disability Pride, was published by New Village Press in 2019.
