= REPOhistory =

Founded in New York City in 1989, REPOhistory was a multi-ethnic group of writers, visual and performance artists, filmmakers, and historians. The organization's name means "repossessing history" and was modeled after the movie title Repo Man. REPOhistory's goal was to "relocate, retrieve, and document missing or absent historical narratives from specific sites in New York City." In order to accomplish this goal, the group created public installations, performances, educational activities, printed matter and other visual media, though REPOhistory is best known for erecting temporary historical markers on city streets that focused on issues of slavery, colonialism, race, gender, and class. The group believed that the arts were essential to shaping a collective cultural identity and their work instigated a questioning of the cultural practices of the 1980s and the early 1990s.
