= Margaret Randall =

American writer and photographer (born 1936)

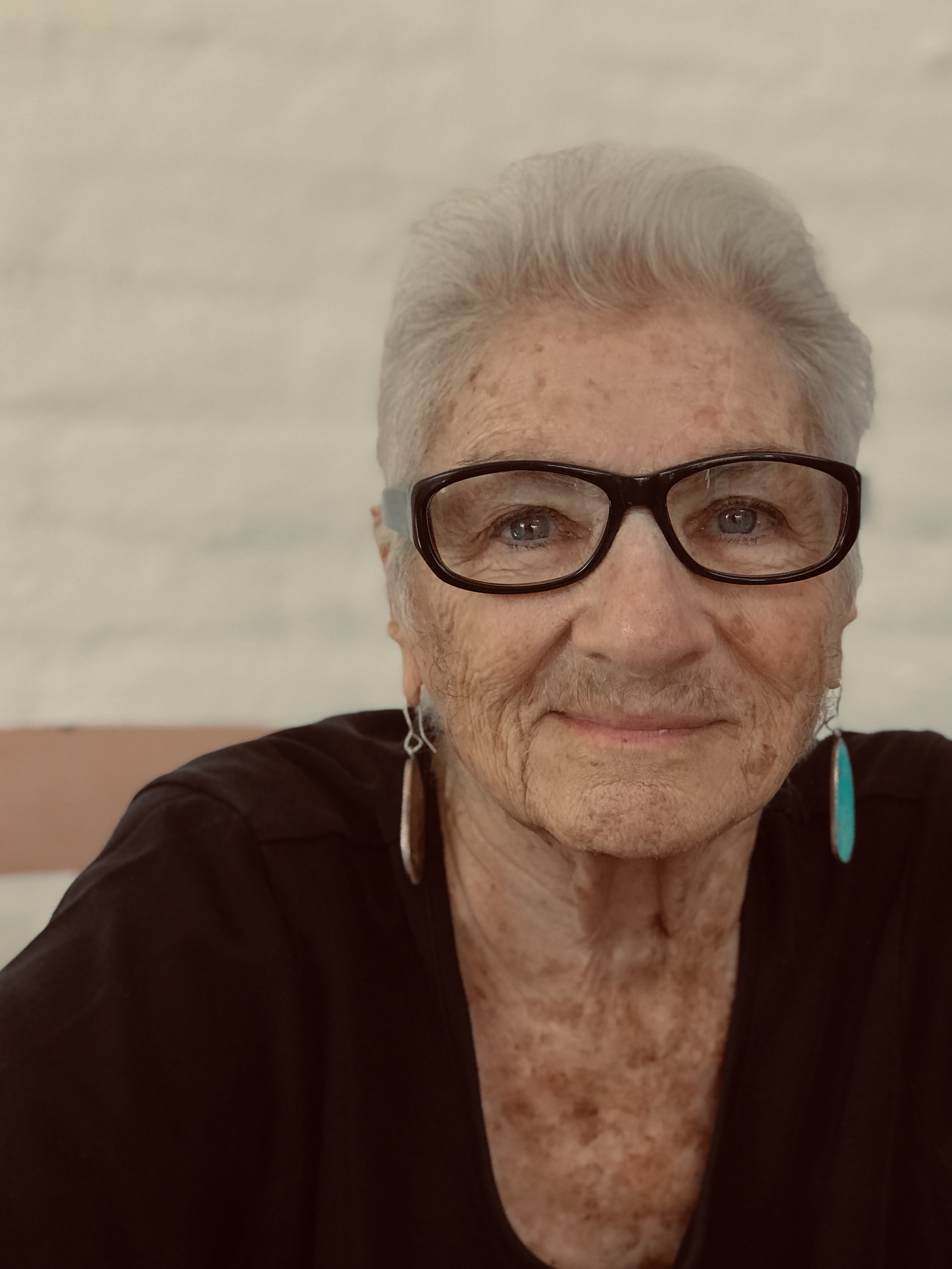
- Born: 1936 (age 89–90); New York City, New York, USA
- Occupations: Writer and photographer
- Years active: c. 1959–present
- Website: margaretrandall.org

Margaret Randall (born 1936, New York City, USA) is an American writer, photographer, activist, and academic. Born in New York City, she lived for many years in Spain, Mexico, Cuba, and Nicaragua, and spent time in North Vietnam during the last months of the U.S. war in that country. She has written extensively on her experiences abroad and back in the United States and has taught at Trinity College in Hartford, Connecticut, and other colleges.

== Biography ==
In 1958, she met with Elaine de Kooning in New Mexico, where the painter had a teaching position, and they became friends. Margaret Randall being a fan of bullfights would take Elaine to Mexico to watch these events.

Randall moved to Mexico in the 1960s, married the Mexican poet Sergio Mondragón and gave up her American citizenship. She moved to Cuba in 1969, where she deepened her interest in women's issues and wrote oral histories of mainly women, "want[ing] to understand what a socialist revolution could mean for women, what problems it might solve and which leave unsolved." Her 2009 memoir To Change The World: My Years in Cuba chronicle that period of her life. She lived in Managua, Nicaragua, from 1980 to 1984, writing about Nicaraguan women, and returned to the United States after an absence of 23 years.

Shortly after her return in 1984, she was ordered deported under the McCarran-Walter Act of 1952. The government’s case rested on two arguments. First, while living in Mexico and married to a Mexican citizen, she had taken out Mexican citizenship, thereby presumably losing her U.S. citizenship. This was in 1967. In addition, under McCarran-Walter, the government claimed that the opinions Randall expressed in several of her books were "against the good order and happiness of the United States". The INS district director gave the justification that "her writings go far beyond mere dissent". With the support of many well-known writers and others, Randall won a Board of Immigration Appeals case in 1989 ordering the INS to grant her adjustment of status to permanent residence and restoration of citizenship.

She now lives in Albuquerque, New Mexico, with her wife, the painter Barbara Byers. She travels widely to read and lecture. She was a professor at Trinity College in Hartford, Connecticut, and also taught briefly at the University of New Mexico, Macalester College, and the University of Delaware.

Among her best-known books are Cuban Women Now, Sandino’s Daughters, Sandino’s Daughters Revisited, and When I Look into the Mirror and see You: Women, Terror and Resistance (all oral history with essay).

Recent books include Che On My Mind (essay), The Rhizome as a Field of Broken Bones (poetry), and Haydée Santamaría, Cuban Revolutionary: She Led by Transgression (essays), .To Change the World: My Years in Cuba (memoir, with photos), Narrative of Power and First Laugh (essay), and Stones Witness, Their Backs to the Sea, My Town, Something's Wrong with the Cornfields, and Ruins (poems, with photos), and As If the Empty Chair / Como si la silla vacía (poems in tribute to the disappeared of Latin America, in bilingual edition, translations by Leandro Katz and Diego Guerra). Time’s Language: Selected Poems 1959-2018 was published by Wing’s Press in 2018. In 2020 Duke University Press brought out her memoir, I Never Left Home: Poet, Feminist, Revolutionary.

Two of Randall’s photographs are in the Capitol Collection at the New Mexico State Capitol in Santa Fe. In 2017 she was awarded a medal for Literary Achievement by the state of Chihuahua, Mexico, in 2019 Poesía en Paralelo Cero gave her its Poet of Two Hemispheres Prize, and Casa de las Américas in Cuba gave her its prestigious Haydée Santamaría medal. That same year the University of New Mexico awarded her its Doctor Honoris Causa in Letters. In 2020 she won AWP’s George Garrett prize and Chapman University’s Paulo Freire distinction.

Randall's four children are Gregory (born 1960), Sarah (born 1963), Ximena (born 1964), and Ana (born 1969). Her ten grandchildren are: Lía, Martín, Daniel, Ricardo, Sebastián, Juan, Luis Rodrigo, Mariana, Eli and Tolo. She has two great grandchildren: Guillermo and Emma Nahui.

== Works ==
Her writings include:

- Randall, Margaret (1959). Giants of Tears: and Other Poems. Tejon Press.
- ——; De Kooning, Elaine (1961). Ecstasy is a Number: Poems. Orion Press.
- —— (1965). October. Ediciones el Corno Emplumado.
- —— (1967). Water I Slip into at Night: Poems. Printed at Talleres Avelar y de la Parra.
- —— (1967). 25 Stages of My Spine. Elizabeth Press.
- —— (1 January 1975). Los Hippies: Expresión de una Crisis (Volume 11 of Colección mínima). Siglo Veintiuno. ISBN 978-968-23-0777-5.
- —— (1968). So Many Rooms has a House, but One Roof. New Rivers Press.
- ——; Mondragón, Sergio (1969). El Corno emplumado, Issue 31.
- —— (1973). Part of the Solution: Portrait of a Revolutionary. New Directions.
- —— (1973). Sobre la situación de la mujer. Serie de charlas: Visión crítica del Movimiento Feminista y su significado para la mujer trabajadora latinoamericana (PDF). SINAMOS -Centro de Estudios de Participación Popular.
- ——; Slipka, Yvonne (1974). Cuban Women Now: Interview with Cuban Women. Women's Press.
- —— (1974). With Our Hands. New Star Books.
- —— (1975). Sprit of The People. New Star Books. ISBN 9780919888586.
- —— (1978). Estos cantos habitados. Colorado State Review Press.
- —— (1978). Carlota: Prose & Poems from Havana. New Star Books. ISBN 9780919888814.
- ——; Tijerino, Doris (1978). Inside the Nicaraguan Revolution. New Star Books. ISBN 9780919888845.
- —— (1978-06-01). We. Smyrna Press. ISBN 9780918266101.
- ——; Moreno, Angel Antonio (1 January 1979). Sueños y realidades del Guajiricantor. Siglo XXI. pp. 105–. ISBN 978-968-23-0536-8.
- —— (1980). No se puede hacer la revolución sin nosotras.
- —— (1980). Todas estamos despiertas: Testimonios de la mujer nicaragüense de hoy. Siglo XXI. ISBN 9789682310119.
- ——; Janda, Judy (1981). Women in Cuba: 20 Years Later. Smyrna Press. ISBN 9780918266149.
- —— (1975). Spirit of the people. New Star Books. ISBN 978-0-919888-58-6.
- —— (1982). Breaking the Silences: An Anthology of 20th-century Poetry by Cuban Women. Pulp Press. ISBN 978-0-88978-106-1.
- —— (1983). Christians in the Nicaraguan revolution. ISBN 9780919573154.
- —— (1984). A Poetry of Resistance: Selected Poems and Prose from Central America.
- —— (1995-07-01). Risking a Somersault in the Air: Conversations with Nicaraguan Writers. Solidarity Publications. ISBN 9780915306923.; Curbstone Press/ Northwestern University Press, 1995, ISBN 9780915306923
- —— (May 1985). Women Brave in the Face of Danger: Photographs of and Writings by Latin and North American women. Crossing Press. ISBN 978-0-89594-162-6.
- —— (1985). Testimonios: A Guide to Oral History.
- —— (1985). Cristianos en la revolución: Del testimonio a la lucha.
- —— (1 January 1986). The Coming Home Poems. LongRiver Books. ISBN 978-0-942986-04-4.
- —— (1986). Albuquerque: Coming Back to the U.S.A. New Star Books, Limited. ISBN 978-0-919573-53-6.
- —— (1 June 1987). This is about incest. Firebrand Books. ISBN 978-0-932379-29-0.
- ——; Robert E. Schweitzer (1988). Photographs by Margaret Randall: Image and Content in Differing Cultural Contexts. The Museum.
- ——; Hubbard, Ruth (1988). The Shape of Red: Insider/outsider reflections. Cleis Press. ISBN 9780939416189.
- Randall, Margaret (1 January 1989). Las mujeres. Siglo XXI. ISBN 978-968-23-1583-1.
- —— (1990). Coming Home: Peace Without Complacency. West End Press. ISBN 0931122570.
- —— (1992-09-01). Dancing with the Doe: New and Selected Poems 1986-1991. West End Press. ISBN 9780931122705.
- —— (1992). Gathering rage: The failure of twentieth century revolutions to develop a feminist agenda. Monthly Review Press. ISBN 085345860X.
- —— (1 June 1992). The Old Cedar Bar. Illustrator E. J. Gold. Gateways Books & Tapes. ISBN 978-0-89556-092-6.
- —— (1981). Sandino's Daughters: Testimonies of Nicaraguan Women in Struggle. Rutgers University Press. ISBN 978-0-8135-2214-2.
- —— (1988-03-01). Memory says yes. Curbstone Press. ISBN 9780915306770.
- —— (1994). Sandino's Daughters Revisited: Feminism in Nicaragua. Rutgers University Press. ISBN 978-0-8135-2025-4.
- —— (1981). Sandino's Daughters: Testimonies of Nicaraguan Women in Struggle. Rutgers University Press. ISBN 978-0-8135-2214-2.
- —— (1996). The Price You Pay: The Hidden Cost of Women's Relationship to Money. Routledge. ISBN 978-0-415-91204-4.
- —— (March 1997). Hunger's Table: Women, Food & Politics. ISBN 9781576010006.
- —— (January 1991). Walking to the Edge: Essays of Resistance. South End Press. ISBN 978-0-89608-397-4.
- —— (1999). Las Hijas de Sandino: una historia abierta. Anamá Ediciones Centroamericanas. ISBN 978-99924-807-4-8.
- —— (2001). Coming up for air. Pennywhistle Press. ISBN 978-0-938631-36-1.
- —— (January 1995). Our voices, our lives: stories of women from Central America and the Caribbean. Common Courage Press. ISBN 978-1-56751-047-8.
- —— (2003). When I Look Into the Mirror and See You: Women, Terror, and Resistance. Rutgers University Press. ISBN 978-0-8135-3185-4.
- —— (2002). Where They Left You for Dead: Halfway Home. EdgeWork Books. ISBN 978-1-931223-06-5.
- —— (December 2004). Narrative of Power: Essays for an Endangered Century. Common Courage Press. ISBN 978-1-56751-263-2.
- —— (1 October 2004). Into Another Time: Grand Canyon Reflections : Poems. WEST END Press. ISBN 978-0-9753486-2-8.
- —— (2007). Stones Witness. University of Arizona Press. ISBN 978-0-8165-2643-7.
- —— (6 January 2009). To Change the World: My Years in Cuba. Rutgers University Press. ISBN 978-0-8135-4645-2.
- —— (2009). Their Backs to the Sea: Poems and Photographs. Wings Press. ISBN 978-0-916727-61-1.
- —— (2010). My Town: A Memoir of Albuquerque, New Mexico in Poems, Prose and Photographs. Wings Press. ISBN 978-0-916727-73-4.
- —— (2011). Something's Wrong with the Cornfields. Skylight Press. ISBN 978-1-908011-10-7.
- —— (12 July 2011). Ruins. UNM Press. ISBN 978-0-8263-5068-8.
- —— (1 January 2011). As If the Empty Chair: Poems for the Disappeared. Wings Press. ISBN 978-1-60940-159-7.
- —— (2011). First Laugh: Essays, 2000-2009. U of Nebraska Press. ISBN 978-0-8032-3499-4.
- —— (1 June 2013). The Rhizome As a Field of Broken Bones. Wings Press. pp. 9–. ISBN 978-1-60940-274-7.
- —— (1 October 2013). Che on My Mind. Duke University Press. ISBN 978-0822369042.
- —— (1 August 2015). Haydée Santamaría, Cuban Revolutionary. Duke University Press. ISBN 978-0822359623.
- —— (28 April 2017). Exporting Revolution. Duke University Press. ISBN 978-0822355922.
- —— (September 15, 2018). Time's Language: Selected Poems 1959-2018. Wings Press. ISBN 978-1609405731.
- —— (March 13, 2020). I Never Left Home: Poet, Feminist, Revolutionary. Duke University Press. ISBN 978-1-4780-0618-3.
- —— (April 15, 2020). My Life in 100 Objects. New Village Press. ISBN 978-1-61332-114-0.
- —— (May 2020). Estrellas de mar sobre una playa: los poemas de la pandemia / Starfish on a Beach: The Pandemic Poems. Escarabajo and Abisinia. ISBN 978-958-52793-1-5.
- —— (August 2020). Starfish on a Beach. Wings Press. ISBN 978-1-60940-615-8.
- —— (February 2020). Los Beat: 20 poetas de la beat generation. Escarabajo. ISBN 978-958-52674-04.
- —— (August 2020). Dominga Rescues the Flag / Dominga rescata la bandera. Two Wings Press. ISBN 978-0-578-22285-1.
- —— (February 2021). Los Beat: 20 poetas de la beat generation. Valparaiso. ISBN 978-84-18082-30-6.
- —— (May 2021). Contra la atrocidad. Valparaiso.
- —— (August 2021). Fuera de la violencia hacia la poesía / Out of Violence into Poetry. La Moneda.
- —— (August 2021). Pensando en pensar. Heredad.
- —— (2021). Thinking about Thinking. Abiquiú, NM: Casa Urraca Press. ISBN 978-1-7351516-4-9.
- ——; Byers, Barbara (April 2022). Stormclouds Like Unkept Promises. Abiquiú, NM: Casa Urraca Press. ISBN 9781956375046.
- —— (August 2022). Artists in My Life. New Village Press. ISBN 978-1-61332-158-4.
- —— (2023). Vertigo of Risk. Abiquiú, NM: Casa Urraca Press. ISBN 9781956375138.
- —— (2023). Luck. New Village Press. ISBN 9781613322192.
- —— (2023). Home: Poems. Abiquiú, NM: Casa Urraca Press. ISBN 9781956375305.
- —— (2024). This Honest Land. Wings Press. ISBN 9781609406271.
- —— (2024). Last Words: Essays. Abiquiú, NM: Casa Urraca Press. ISBN 9781956375343.
- Randall, Margaret (2024). Letters from the Edge: Outrider Conversations. New York, NY: New Village Press. ISBN 978-1-61332-263-5.
