= Mindy Thompson Fullilove =

American clinical psychiatrist

Mindy Thompson Fullilove (born October 15, 1950) is an American social psychiatrist who focuses on the ways social and environmental factors affect the mental health of communities. She is currently a professor of Urban Policy and Health at The New School.

Trained at Bryn Mawr College and Columbia University, Fullilove has conducted research on AIDS and other epidemics of poor communities and studied the links between the environment and mental health. Her research examines the mental health effects of environmental processes such as violence, segregation, and urban renewal.

== Early life ==
Fullilove grew up in Orange, N.J. Her father, Ernie Thompson, was a labor organizer in Jersey City and was the first black field organizer hired by the United Electrical Radio and Machine Workers Union. Her mother, Maggie, was a white woman from Chippewa Lake, Ohio, who worked as a union hall secretary. Fullilove's parents launched a successful campaign in Orange to desegregate local schools. She attended Unitarian Universalist Church as a child.

== Education ==
Fullilove graduated cum laude from Bryn Mawr College in 1971 with a BA in History. She received an MS in Nutrition from Columbia University in 1974 and an MD in Medicine from Columbia University in 1978. Fullilove received a Board Certification in Psychiatry in 1984. Additionally, she holds a certificate in Landscape Design from the New York Botanical Garden.

== Career ==
Fullilove has been elected to the New York Psychiatric Society, the American College of Psychiatrists, and the New York Academy of Medicine. She is also a member of the American Psychiatric Association and the American Public Health Association. Fullilove was an Assistant Clinical Professor of Psychiatry at the UCSF Center for AIDS Prevention Studies from 1983 until 1990. She joined the faculty at Columbia University in 1990 as an Associate Professor of Clinical Psychiatry and Public Health, becoming Professor of Clinical Psychiatry and Sociomedical Sciences in 1999, a position she held until 2016 when she joined the New School faculty. She is a Professor of Urban Policy and Health at the Milano School of Management, Policy, and Environment at the New School. There, she has been working on a project entitled 400 Years of Inequality, which examines events that have shaped inequality in the United States, going as far back as 1619.

=== Other work ===
==== The CLIMB Project ====
In 2004, Fullilove helped start the CLIMB (City Life is Moving Bodies) Project, a community-based initiative in Upper Manhattan that promotes physical, social, and civic activity among northern Manhattan residents and is committed to ensuring parks are safe and accessible to all. The project has sparked millions of investments, including one of $30 million in 2016 dedicated to updating Highbridge Park.

==== University of Orange ====
In 2007, Fullilove and other community activists founded the University of Orange, a free popular education center located in her hometown, to promote civic engagement and active citizen participation in the community. She currently serves as the university's President of the Board of Directors.

==== Interdisciplinary Research Leaders ====
Fullilove is a member of one of the fifteen teams assembled by Interdisciplinary Research Leaders, a program led by the University of Minnesota to build healthier and more equitable communities. Her project, Making the Just City: An Examination of Organizing for Equity and Health in Shaw and Orange, is focused on helping people stay in neighborhoods that are facing the economic and social pressures of gentrification.

== Honors and awards ==
- 2016 Honorary Member of the American Institute of Architects
- 2011 Purpose Prize Fellow
- 2005 Producer, “Urban Renewal Is People Removal,” Best Short Documentary, Trenton Film Festival
- 2004 Jeanne Spurlock Minority Fellowship Achievement Award of the American Psychiatric Association
- 2003 National Associate of the National Academy of Sciences
- 2002 Doctor of Humane Letters, Bank Street College, New York, NY
- 2000 Investigator Award
- 1999 Honorary Doctorate, Chatham College
- 1998–1999 Maurice Falk Fellow at the Center for Minority Health, U. Pittsburgh GSPH
- 1989 California Association of County Drug Program Administrators, Award for Drug Abuse Research
- 1979–1982 American Psychiatric Association–National Institute of Mental Health Minority Fellow

== Publications ==
Books

- Main Street: How A City's Heart Connects Us All. New Village Press, 2020.
- Cooper, L.F., & Fullilove, From Enforcers to Guardians: A Public Health Primer on Ending Police Violence. Johns Hopkins University Press, Baltimore, 2020.
- Thompson, E., & Fullilove, Homeboy Came to Orange: A Story of People's Power. New Village Press, New York, 2018.
- Root Shock: How Tearing Up City Neighborhoods Hurts America and What We Can Do About It. New Village Press, New York, 2016.
- Urban Alchemy: Restoring Joy in America’s Sorted-out Cities. New Village Press, 2013.
- Wallace, R., & Fullilove, M.T. Collective Consciousness and Its Discontents: Institutional Distributed Cognition, Racial Policy and Public Health in the United States. Springer Publishing, 2008.
- Root Shock: How Tearing Up City Neighborhoods Hurts America and What We Can Do About It. Random House, New York, 2004.
- The House of Joshua: Meditations on Family and Place. University of Nebraska Press, Lincoln, 1999.
- The Black Family: Mental Health Perspectives. Black Task Force, UCSF, CA., 1984.
- Thompson, E., & Fullilove, M.T. Homeboy Came to Orange: A Story of People's Power. Buildgebuilder Press, Newark, 1976.
- Thompson, Mindy "The National Negro Labor Council: A History" (Honors Thesis at Bryn Mawr College). The American Institute For Marxist Studies. San Jose, CA, 1978
