= Architects/Designers/Planners for Social Responsibility =

Architects/Designers/Planners for Social Responsibility (ADPSR) is a 501(c)(3) non profit organization established in 1981. Its stated mission is to work "for peace, environmental protection, ecological building, social justice, and the development of healthy communities." ADPSR programs promote professional and public awareness of critical social and environmental issues, and the non profit also honors individuals and organizations that "exemplify ADPSR's goals of peace, preservation of the natural and build environment, and socially responsible development" with its annual Lewis Mumford Awards. ADPSR was first established to promote nuclear disarmament and correct the imbalances caused by military excesses overshadowing domestic needs. Throughout the 1980s, the non-profit initiated numerous peace projects including peace parks, conferences, exhibits, and citizen diplomacy exchange programs with the former Soviet Union. ADPSR was honored for this work in 1993 by the American Institute of Architects, which called ADPSR "a strong, resounding voice for social and political justice." Since the 1990s, the organization has focused much of its effort on ecological and socially responsible development.

== Projects ==
ADPSR has received media attention for its proposal to amend the American Institute of Architects' Code of Ethics. The proposed rule reads, "Members shall not design spaces intended for execution or for torture or other cruel, inhuman, or degrading treatment or punishment, including prolonged solitary confinement," citing multiple organizations' identification of prolonged solitary confinement as torture. In December 2014, the AIA rejected this petition to disallow members to design solitary confinement cells, death chambers, and facilities for torture. This rejection, according to Raphael Sperry, President of ADPSR, goes against the AIA's current ethics code which states, "Members should uphold human rights in all their professional endeavors." Helene Combs Dreiling, former president of the AIA, has spoken on behalf of the institute, stating that "The AIA Code of Ethics should not exist to create limitations on the practice by AIA members of specific building types," and that "[the Code] isn’t about what architects build."

This proposal and rejection have sparked a debate to which several publications, including The New York Times, ArchDaily, and Architectural Record, have added their voices. In response to the AIA's rejection, Sperry states, "Is there nothing so odious that the A.I.A. wouldn't step in? ... What about concentration camps? The A.I.A. is basically saying business is more important than human rights. Yes, this is a tough profession. But you don't gain respect by hunkering down in a position of fear. You just dig yourself deeper into a hole."

ADPSR is an NGO in the United Nations program UN-Habitat, whose mission is "to promote socially and environmentally sustainable human settlements development and the achievement of adequate shelter for all."
