= List of Sites of Special Scientific Interest in North West Sutherland =

The following is a list of Sites of Special Scientific Interest in the North West Sutherland Area of Search; for South East Sutherland see List of SSSIs in South East Sutherland. For SSSIs elsewhere in Scotland, see List of SSSIs by Area of Search.

- Aird Torrisdale (Note: Part of Aird Torrisdale SSSI overlaps with Invernaver SSSI.)
- Altnaharra (Note: Altnaharra SSSI is also designated Altnaharra Special Area of Conservation (SAC) due to the habitat present. Altnaharra SSSI overlaps with part of the River Naver SAC.)
- A' Mhoine
- Ardvar Woodlands (Note: Ardvar Woodlands SSSI is part of Ardvar and Loch a’ Mhuilinn Woodlands SAC due to the habitats and species present.)
- Armadale Gorge
- Assynt Lochs (Note: Assynt Lochs SSSI is also designated Assynt Lochs Special Protection Area (SPA) due to the presence of the black-throated diver.) (Note: Part of Assynt Lochs SSSI overlaps with Loch Beannach Islands SSSI.)
- Bad na Gallaig (Note: Bad na Gallaig SSSI is part of Caithness and Sutherland Peatlands SAC due to the habitats and species present. It also overlaps with the River Navar SAC due to the species present.) (Note: Bad na Gallaig SSSI is part of Caithness and Sutherland Peatlands SPA due to the bird species present.)
- Ben Griams (Note: Part of Ben Griams SSSI is part of Caithness and Sutherland Peatlands SAC due to the habitats and species present. Part of Ben Griams SSSI is part of Caithness and Sutherland Peatlands SPA due to the bird species present.)
- Ben Hope
- Ben Hutig
- Ben Klibreck
- Ben Loyal
- Ben More Assynt
- Cam Loch
- Cape Wrath
- Carn A'Mhadaidh
- Cnoc an Alaskie (Note: Cnoc an Alaskie SSSI is part of the Caithness and Sutherland Peatlands SAC due to the habitats and species present. Cnoc an Alaskie SSSI is part of the Caithness and Sutherland Peatlands SPA due to the bird species present.)
- Druim na Coibe (Note: Druim na Coibe SSSI is part of the Caithness and Sutherland Peatlands SAC due to the habitats and species present. Druim na Coibe SSSI is also part of the Caithness and Sutherland Peatlands SPA due to the bird species present.)
- Druim nam Bad (Note: Druim nam Bad SSSI is part of the Caithness and Sutherland Peatlands SAC due to the habitats and species present. Druim nam Bad SSSI is also part of the Caithness and Sutherland Peatlands SPA due to the bird species present.)
- Durness (Note: Part of Durness SSSI is also Durness SAC due to the habitats and species present.)
- East Halladale (Note: East Halladale SSSI is part of the Caithness and Sutherland Peatlands SAC due to the habitats and species present. East Halladale SSSI is also part of the Caithness and Sutherland Peatlands SPA due to the bird species present.)
- Eilean Hoan (Note: Eilean Hoan SSSI is also part of the North Sutherland Coastal Islands SPA due to the presence of the barnacle goose.)
- Eilean nan Ròn
- Eriboll
- Foinaven (Note: Foinaven SSSI includes the peaks of Arkle, Cranstackie and Foinaven within its area. Part of Foinaven SSSI is designated Foinaven SAC due to the habitats and species present. Part of Foinaven SSSI is designated Foinaven SPA due to the bird species present.)
- Forsinard Bogs (Note: Forsinard Bogs SSSI is part of Caithness and Sutherland SAC due to the habitats and species present. Forsinard Bogs SSSI is part of Caithness and Sutherland SPA due to the bird species present.)
- Handa Island
- Inverhope
- Invernaver (Note: Part of Invernaver SSSI is designated Invernaver SAC due to the habitats present. Part of Invernaver SSSI overlaps with River Borgie SSSI. That part is also designated River Borgie SAC. Part of Invernaver SSSI overlaps with Aird Torrisdale SSSI. The hamlet of Invernaver lies outside Invernaver SSSI.)
- Inverpolly
- Knockan Cliff
- Knockfin Heights (Note: Knockfin Heights SSSI is part of Caithness and Sutherland Peatlands SAC due to the habitats and species present. It is also part of Caithness and Sutherland SPA due to the bird species present. It overlaps with part of the Berriedale and Langwell Waters SAC due to the presence of atlantic salmon.)
- Loch a' Mhuilinn (Note: Loch a' Mhuilinn SSSI is part of Ardvar and Loch a’ Mhuilinn Woodlands SAC.)
- Loch Awe and Loch Ailsh (Note: Loch Awe and Loch Ailsh SSSI is part of Inverpolly, Loch Urigill and Nearby Lochs SPA due to the presence of the black-throated diver. Part of Loch Awe and Loch Ailsh SSSI overlaps with River Oykel SAC due to the species present.)
- Loch Beannach Islands (Note: Loch Beannach Islands SSSI overlaps wth Assynt Lochs SSSI and Assynt Lochs SPA due to the presence of the black-throated diver.)
- Loch Glencoul
- Loch Laxford (Note: Loch Laxford is designated a Special Area of Conservation not a Site of Special Scientific Interest. The two are not synonymous. See details in reference.)
- Loch Meadie Peatlands (Note: Loch Meadie Peatlands SSSI is part of Caithness and Sutherland Peatlands SAC due to the habitats and species present. Loch Meadie Peatlands SSSI is part of Caithness and Sutherland Peatlands SPA due to the bird species present.)
- Loch Stack and River Laxford
- Loch Urigill
- Lochan Buidhe Mires (Note: Lochan Buidhe Mires SSSI is part of Caithness and Sutherland Peatlands SAC because of the habitats and species present. Lochan Buidhe Mires SSSI is part of Caithness and Sutherland Peatlands SPA because of the bird species present.)
- Lon a' Chuil (Note: Lon a' Chuil SSSI is part of the Caithness and Sutherland Peatlands SAC due to the habitats and species present. Lon a' Chuil SSSI is part of the Caithness and Sutherlnd Peatlands SPA due to the bird species present.)
- Mallart (Note: Mallart SSSI is part of the Caithness and Sutherland Peatlands SAC as a consequence of the habitats and species present within it. Mallart SSSI is also part of the Caithness and Sutherland Peatlands SPA as a result of the bird species present.)
- Red Point Coast (Note: Red Point Coast SSSI is part of the North Caithness Cliffs SPA because of the breeding sites for seabirds present.)
- River Borgie
- Rumsdale Peatlands (Note: Rumsdale Peatlands SSSI is part of Caithness and Sutherland SAC due to the habitats and species present. Rumsdale Peatlands SSSI is part of Caithness and Sutherland SPA due to the bird species present. Part of Rumsdale Peatlands SSSI overlaps with the River Thurso SAC, due to the presence of atlantic salmon.)
- Scourie Coast
- Sheigra - Oldshoremore (Note: Sheigra - Oldshoremore SSSI is part of Oldshoremore and Sandwood SAC due to the habitats present.)
- Skelpick Peatlands (Note: Skelpick Peatlands SSSI is part of the Caithness and Sutherland Peatlands SAC due to the habitats and species present. It is also part of the Caithness and Sutherland SPA due to the bird species present.)
- Skinsdale Peatlands (Note: Skinsdale Peatlands SSSI is part of Caithness and Sutherland Peatlands SAC due to the habitats and species present. It is also part of Caithness and Sutherland Peatlands SPA due to the bird species present.)
- Sletill Peatlands (Note: Sletill Peatlands SSSI is part of the Caithness and Sutherland Peatlands SAC due to the habitats and species present. Sletill Peatlands SSSI is part of the Caithness and Sutherland Peatlands SPA due to the bird species present.)
- Southern Parphe (Note: Part of Southern Parphe SSSI is part of Oldshoremore and Sandwood SAC due to the habitats present.)
- Stack Woods
- Strathy Bogs (Note: Strathy Bogs SSSI is part of the Caithness and Sutherland Peatlands SAC due to the habitats and species present. Strathy Bogs SSSI is part of the Caithness and Sutherland Peatlands SPA due to the bird species present.)
- Strathy Coast (Note: Part of Strathy Coast SSSI is also Strathy Point SAC due to the presence of vegetated sea cliffs.)
- Syre Peatlands (Note: Syre Peatlands SSSI is part of the Caithness and Sutherland Peatlands SAC due to the habitats and species present. Syre Peatlands SSSI is part of the Caithness and Sutherland Peatlands SPA due to the bird species present. Syre Peatlands SSSI also overlaps with the River Naver SAC.)
- Truderscaig (Note: Truderscaig SSSI is part of Caithness and Sutherland Peatlands SAC due to the habitats and species present. Truderscaig SSSI is part of Caithness and Sutherland Peatlands SPA due to the bird species present.)
- West Borgie
- West Halladale (Note: West Halladale SSSI is part of Caithness and Sutherland Peatlands SAC due to the habitats and species present. It is also part of Caithness and Sutherland Peatlands SPA due to the bird species present.)
- West Strathnaver (Note: West Strathnaver SSSI is part of the Caithness and Sutherland Peatlands SAC due to the habitats and species present within the SSSI. West Strathnaver SSSI is also part of the Caithness and Sutherland Peatlans SPA due to the bird species present within the SSSI.)
