= List of listed buildings in Tongue, Highland =

This is a list of listed buildings in the parish of Tongue in Highland, Scotland.

== List ==
Name	Location	Date Listed	Grid Ref. (Note: Sometimes known as OSGB36, the grid reference (where provided) is based on the British national grid reference system used by the Ordnance Survey. • "Guide to National Grid". Ordnance Survey. • "Get-a-map". Ordnance Survey.)	Geo-coordinates	Notes	LB Number (Note: Historic Environment Scotland assign a unique alphanumeric identifier to each designated site in Scotland, for listed buildings this always begins with "LB", for example "LB12345".)	Image
Tongue House Boathouse/Store And Pier				58°29′43″N 4°25′07″W	Category C(S)	19881	Upload Photo
Moin House				58°30′12″N 4°32′40″W	Category C(S)	18455	Upload another image
3 Borgie				58°30′14″N 4°16′26″W	Category C(S)	18465	Upload Photo
4 Borgie				58°30′09″N 4°16′33″W	Category C(S)	18466	Upload Photo
Inchkinloch Bridge Over Allt Innis Ceann An Locha				58°21′51″N 4°23′51″W	Category B	18452	Upload Photo
Tongue House, Sundial				58°29′38″N 4°25′02″W	Category B	18459	Upload Photo
Tongue Mains				58°29′31″N 4°25′14″W	Category B	18462	Upload Photo
Tongue Manse, Steading And Gatepiers				58°28′40″N 4°25′03″W	Category B	18457	Upload Photo
Tongue House				58°29′39″N 4°25′05″W	Category A	18458	Upload Photo
6 Borgie And Steading				58°29′57″N 4°16′47″W	Category C(S)	18467	Upload Photo
Scullomie Pier				58°31′12″N 4°22′31″W	Category B	18468	Upload Photo
Tongue Parish Church (C Of S ), Burial Ground And Gatepiers				58°28′44″N 4°25′06″W	Category A	18456	Upload Photo
Tongue House Gatepiers And Garden Walls				58°29′38″N 4°25′09″W	Category B	18461	Upload Photo
1 Borgie And Steading				58°30′25″N 4°16′22″W	Category C(S)	18463	Upload Photo
5 Borgie				58°30′01″N 4°16′41″W	Category C(S)	19882	Upload Photo
Borgie Bridge Over River Borgie				58°29′47″N 4°17′11″W	Category B	18451	Upload Photo
Melness House				58°30′45″N 4°26′16″W	Category B	18454	Upload Photo
2 Borgie And Steading				58°30′20″N 4°16′24″W	Category C(S)	18464	Upload Photo
Kyle Of Tongue Look-Out/Ferry House				58°29′33″N 4°25′44″W	Category B	18453	Upload Photo
Tongue House, Walled Garden				58°29′38″N 4°25′02″W	Category B	18460	Upload Photo

== Key ==
The scheme for classifying buildings in Scotland is:

- Category A: "buildings of national or international importance, either architectural or historic; or fine, little-altered examples of some particular period, style or building type."
- Category B: "buildings of regional or more than local importance; or major examples of some particular period, style or building type, which may have been altered."
- Category C: "buildings of local importance; lesser examples of any period, style, or building type, as originally constructed or moderately altered; and simple traditional buildings which group well with other listed buildings."

In March 2016 there were 47,288 listed buildings in Scotland. Of these, 8% were Category A, and 50% were Category B, with the remaining 42% being Category C.

== See also ==
- List of listed buildings in Highland
