= Torrisdale Bay =

Torrisdale Bay may refer to:

- Torrisdale Bay, Argyll
- Torrisdale Bay, Highland
