= List of Sites of Special Scientific Interest in South East Sutherland =

The following is a list of Sites of Special Scientific Interest in the South East Sutherland Area of Search. For North West Sutherland see List of SSSIs in North West Sutherland. For SSSIs elsewhere in Scotland, see List of SSSIs by Area of Search.

- Alladale Pinewood
- Amat Woods
- Badanloch Bogs
- Ballinreach Coastal Gorges
- Beinn Dearg
- Ben Griams
- Ben Klibreck
- Ben More Assynt
- Carrol Rock
- Cnoc an Alaskie
- Coir' an Eoin
- Creag na Croiche
- Dornoch Firth
- Dunrobin Coast
- Garbh Allt
- Grudie Peatlands
- Helmsdale Coast
- Inverbrora
- Knockfin Heights
- Kyle of Sutherland Marshes
- Lairg and Strathbrora Lochs
- Ledmore Wood
- Loch Awe and Loch Ailsh
- Loch Fleet
- Lon A'Chuil
- Loth Gorge
- Migdale Rock
- Mound Alderwoods
- Oykel Gorge
- Rhidorroch Woods
- Skinsdale Peatlands
- Spinningdale Bog
- Strath an Loin
- Strath Carnaig and Strath Fleet Moors
- Strath Duchally
- Strathfleet
- Torboll Woods
