= Wilmer Wilson IV =

American artist (born 1989)

- Born: 1989 (age 36–37); Richmond, VA
- Education: Howard University, University of Pennsylvania
- Known for: Performance Art

Wilmer Wilson IV (born 1989) is an American artist based in Philadelphia, Pennsylvania who works in performance, photography, sculpture, and other media. Although typically identified as a performance artist, Wilson also works with sculpture and photography.

== Early life and education ==
Wilson was born in Richmond, Virginia. He received his Bachelor of Fine Arts in Photography from Howard University in 2012 and later his Master of Fine Arts from the Weitzman School of Design at the University of Pennsylvania in 2015.

== Awards ==
Wilson's work has been exhibited widely in the U.S. and Europe in galleries, art fairs and museums. Wilson has been the recipient of a Pew Center for Arts & Heritage Fellowship and an American Academy in Rome Fellowship.

He has also been awarded several public art and museum commissions including the DC Commission on the Arts and Humanities (5x5 Public Art Commission) and a Films4Peace Commission. Additionally, Wilson's work and performances have been presented at The New Museum; Museum of Fine Arts, Boston; Barnes Foundation, Philadelphia; New Orleans Museum of Art; Birmingham Museum of Art; Crystal Bridges Museum of American Art; American University Museum; The National Portrait Gallery; and, the In Flanders Fields Museum, Ypres, Belgium. His work is housed in the permanent collections of the Baltimore Museum of Art; Museum of Fine Arts, Boston; New Orleans Museum of Art; Birmingham Museum of Art; Crystal Bridges Museum of American Art; The Phillips Collections; West Collection, Oaks, Pennsylvania; and, the 21C Museum-Hotel, Louisville, KY. as well as the Virginia Museum of Fine Arts, Richmond, VA.

== Press ==
Wilson has been reviewed in multiple American and European newspapers and art magazines. In 2018 American art critic Holland Cotter described Wilson's work as "gorgeous" in a review for The New York Times. The Chicago Tribune has described Wilson as "a material and performance artist focused on ephemera and race." In a 2015 essay, essay, Hannah McShea posited that the artist's performances are "ahead of his time and still a member of a long lineage." The New York Times noted in 2018 that "[i]n his mixed-media work and live performances, Mr. Wilson investigates 'the way that blackness is represented in the city space,' he said—specifically the treatment of black bodies as objects of labor or desire, and the ever-present threat of violence."

== Exhibitions and performances ==
Wilson's earliest exhibitions were around the greater Washington, DC area, and his earliest notable press emerged during his 2011 residency at Strathmore Hall in Bethesda, MD, where he was mentored by well-known Washington, D.C. multimedia artist Tim Tate. As art critic Claudia Rousseau noted in a review of Wilson's residency program exhibition, "This Howard University undergraduate is one to watch."

The artist's durational performance work, Henry "Box" Brown: FOREVER (2012), was a suite of three public performances in Washington, D.C., in which the artist covered his bare body with US postage stamps and walked to post offices asking to be mailed, after the legacy of Henry Box Brown. In Portrait with Hydrogen Peroxide Strips (2015), Wilson stood in the main hall of the National Portrait Gallery and covered his bare body in teeth-whitening hydrogen peroxide strips, a continuation of the artist's interest in creating "skins" out of dense patterns of repeated materials and symbols.

In 2019 Wilson began exploring the use of billboards in his hometown of Richmond to "disrupt billboards’ typical role of advertising by using the platforms to display texts and imagery that will initiate discussion about the anti-police brutality protests and other local activism happening around Richmond."

Between 2013 and 2020, Wilson created a series of artist books featuring blurred photographs he made while running through various cities. The set, A Running Tour of Some Monuments of included volumes for Barcelona, Brussels, London, New Orleans, Philadelphia, and Rome.

Wilmer Wilson IV is represented by Susan Inglett Gallery, New York, and CONNERSMITH, Washington, D.C.
