= Invernaver =

Coordinates: 58.51042°N 4.21781°W

Invernaver: Scottish Gaelic: Inbhir Nabhair
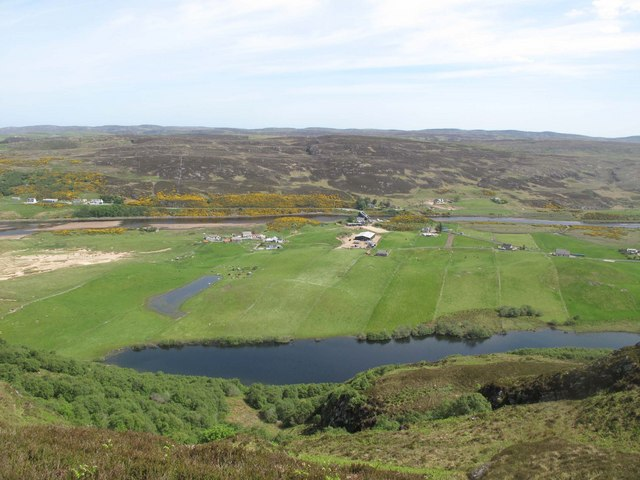
- Invernaver Crofting township Looking across Loch Mer towards the parks of the Invernaver crofts.

- Location within the Sutherland area
- OS grid reference: NC708601
- Council area: Highland
- Lieutenancy area: Sutherland
- Country: Scotland
- Sovereign state: United Kingdom
- Post town: Bettyhill
- Postcode district: KW14 7
- Police: Scotland
- Fire: Scottish
- Ambulance: Scottish

Invernaver (Gaelic: Inbhir Nabhair) is a small, remote hamlet, situated on the west bank of the River Naver as it flows into Torrisdale Bay, in Sutherland, Scottish Highlands and is in the Scottish council area of Highland.

The village of Bettyhill is situated less than 1 mile northeast from Invernaver across the river.
