= Millennium Forest for Scotland =

Environmental initiative to celebrate the turn of the millennium in Scotland

Millennium Forest for Scotland (MFST)
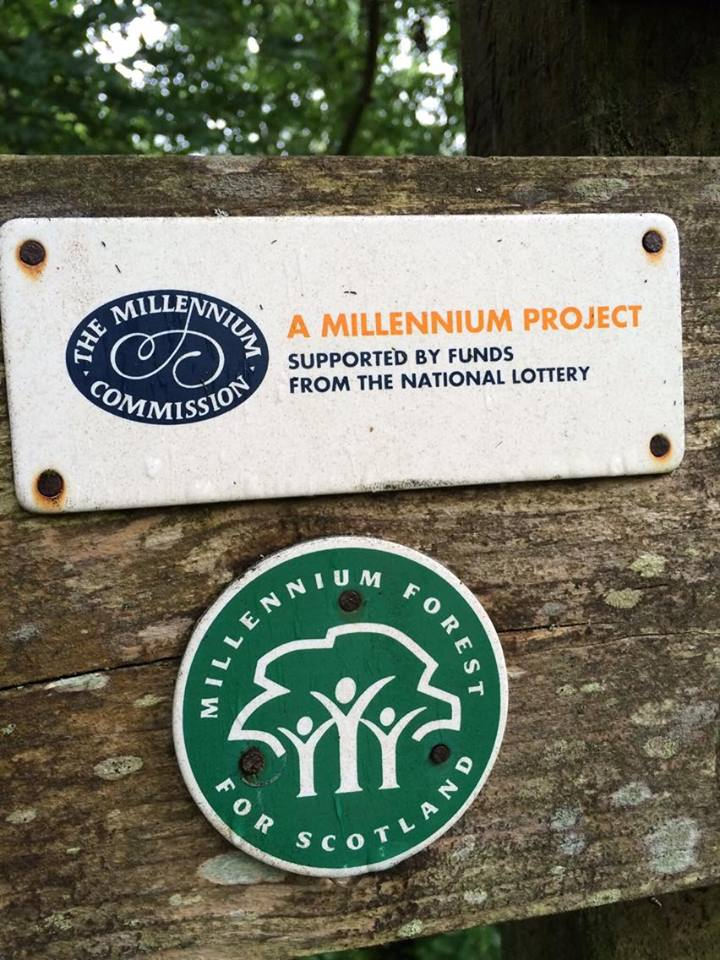
- Logo for the project (green), below the logo of The Millennium Commission seen here on a signpost at Mugdock Country Park.
- Type of project: National Lottery-funded project
- Country: Scotland
- Prime Minister(s): Tony Blair
- Launched: 23 October 1995
- Closed: 31 March 2006
- Budget: £500,000 (estimated)

The Millennium Forest for Scotland project was an initiative created by the Millennium Commission and funded by the National Lottery of the United Kingdom to celebrate the turn of the New Millennium.

Conceived in 1994, the project's ambition was to restore and maintain a significant amount of the forestry in the Scottish environment, and secondly to reestablish the link between local communities and the environment that surrounded them.

The project's nationwide appeal led to many local communities, farms and established natural projects (such as the National Trust for Scotland and the World Wildlife Fund) investing time and money in restoring and maintaining many areas of natural importance throughout Scotland.

As a result of the initiative, it is estimated that the project has restored over 22,000 hectares of forest and natural land and created 200 kilometers of new hiking trails.

Some locations that the project has helped include:

- Angus Millennium Forest, Angus
- Balmaha Millennium Forest Park, Balmaha
- The Millennium Forest, Borgie, Sutherland
- Mugdock Country Park, Milngavie
- Cashel Millennium Forest, Loch Lomond
- Craigrostan Woods, Inversnaid
- Edinburgh (urban forest project)

Although the project was aimed for the turn of the millennium, the efforts and investment in the project lasted over a period of 12 years, with many of the benefits still being felt today. The project ceased to exist following the winding-up of the Millennium Commission in 2006. As seen above, many signposts and markers symbolizing the initiative's legacy can still be seen around Scotland.

== See also ==
- Millennium Commission - National Lottery Good Causes
- Restoration of Scotland's Forests: The Millennium Forest for Scotland Initiative – (Angela Roe, University of Minnesota, 1999)
