= Joe Ovelman =

American artist and author (born 1970)

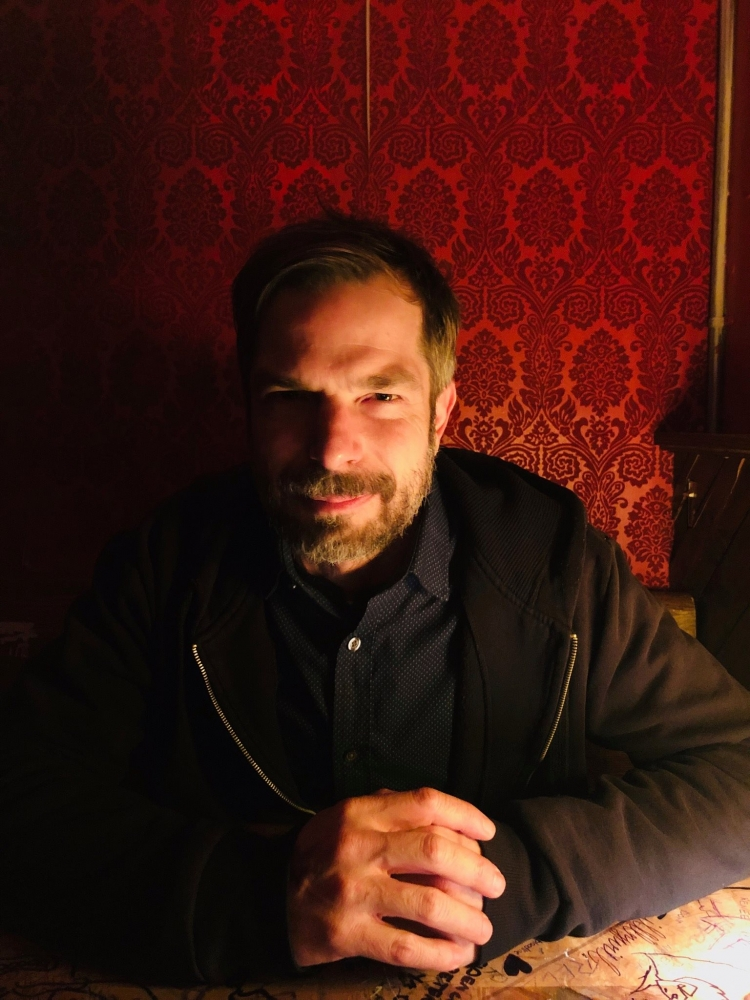
- Ovelman in 2019
- Born: 1970 (age 55–56); West Chester, Pennsylvania, United States
- Website: www.joeovelman.com

Joe Ovelman (born 1970 in West Chester, Pennsylvania) is a US contemporary artist and author who works with video, photography, sculpture, installation art, performance art, artist's books, and drawing. His work has featured in several New York City street murals. Ovelman currently lives and works in New York City. He has also lived in Philadelphia, Palm Springs, California, and São Paulo, Brazil.

== Career ==
Ovelman surveys sexuality, social norms, and marginalized communities in his work. He often invites individuals to participate in projects, whether asking them to don his father's United States Marine Corps Uniform on 12th Street Beach in South Beach Miami, or as recipients of an epic cross-country book-gifting performance, "Boondocking: You I See," 2019. Ovelman's first cited work was an image in The New York Times whose tagline read simply, "Street Art." Ovelman pasted images along the construction wall surrounding Larry Gagosian's Chelsea Gagosian Gallery in a project titled, "Boys 4 Spring," 2000. The project then re-emerged, reimagined, in Richard Anderson's salon exhibition "Living is Easy," in the summer of 2000. His NYC solo exhibition, "Like A Virgin," named for Madonna's second LP, was in 2004. Ovelman's 2011 Connersmith exhibition titled, "Coming Home," was a departure from earlier exhibitions in that it was only sculpture. Ovelman is also known for Sharpie (marker) drawings on Post-it Notes. His notes have expanded beyond the Post-it format in works such as "When I grow up," 2003, "12 Drawings," 2007, and as artist's books beginning in 2018. His work is in private collections, the Wadsworth Atheneum Museum of Art, and in Michael Petry's The Word is Art, (Thames and Hudson), 2018. His photographs also appear on the Arsenal Pulp Press covers of Daniel Allen Cox's book, Shuck, and Terry Goldie's, queersexlife. In 2024, Ovelman participated in curator Patrick Burton's Detroit queer biennial exhibition, Mighty Real Queer Detroit, exhibiting work at three venues: Scarab Club, The Carr Center, and Wayne State University's Elaine L. Jacob gallery. His latest book, "Jesus's Daddy Issues," 2026, imagines Jesus Christ raised by his wealthy, gay, atheist Uncle, Joseph of Pennsylvania, (J.O.P.) calling out hypocrisy, performative piety, and societal obsession with private morality.

== Artist's books ==
- Pictures and Words, (Volume 6), (S.T.H. Editions), 2018.
- Destination Wedding, (Two Cover Color Options in The Beverly Hills Hotel Green and Pink), 2018.
- On Grief, 2019.
- You I See, 2019.
- Fourteen Schools in Fourteen Days, 2020.
- Die Fame Die, 2020.
- SEX in the 11206, 2022.
- The Last Gayborhood, 2023.
- SAUNA DISH, 2025.
- Jesus's Daddy Issues, 2026.
