= Loch Loyal =

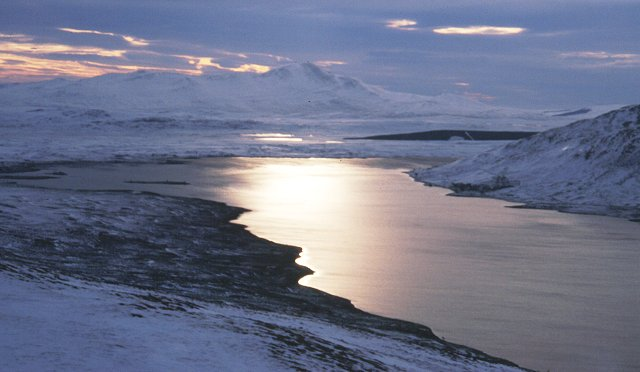
- Loch Loyal

- Location within Highland
- Location: Sutherland, Highland, Scotland
- Coordinates: 58°23′52.24″N 4°21′24.46″W
- Type: Freshwater loch, ribbon lake
- Primary inflows: Lon Achadh na h-Aibhne
- Primary outflows: Loch Craggie, River Borgie
- Basin countries: Scotland
- Max. length: 4 mi (6.4 km)
- Max. width: 0.5 mi (0.80 km)
- Max. depth: 200 ft (61 m)
- Surface elevation: 85 ft (26 m)
- Islands: 6

Loch Loyal is a freshwater Scottish loch, located near Lairg in Sutherland, in the northern Highlands.

Loch loyal ranges about four miles (6.4 km) long by about one half (0.8 km) wide, and drops to a depth of two hundred feet (61 m). The Loch flows north through Loch Craggie and Loch Slaim into the River Borgie. Loch Loyal is surrounded by mountain ranges that include Beinn Stumanadh, Ben Hiel, and Cnoc nan Cuilean. The town of Tongue is close to Loch Loyal. In 2002 Loch Loyal had a population of one thousand greylag geese and provides nesting sites for rare black-throated divers.
