= Connersmith =

Art gallery in Washington, DC, US

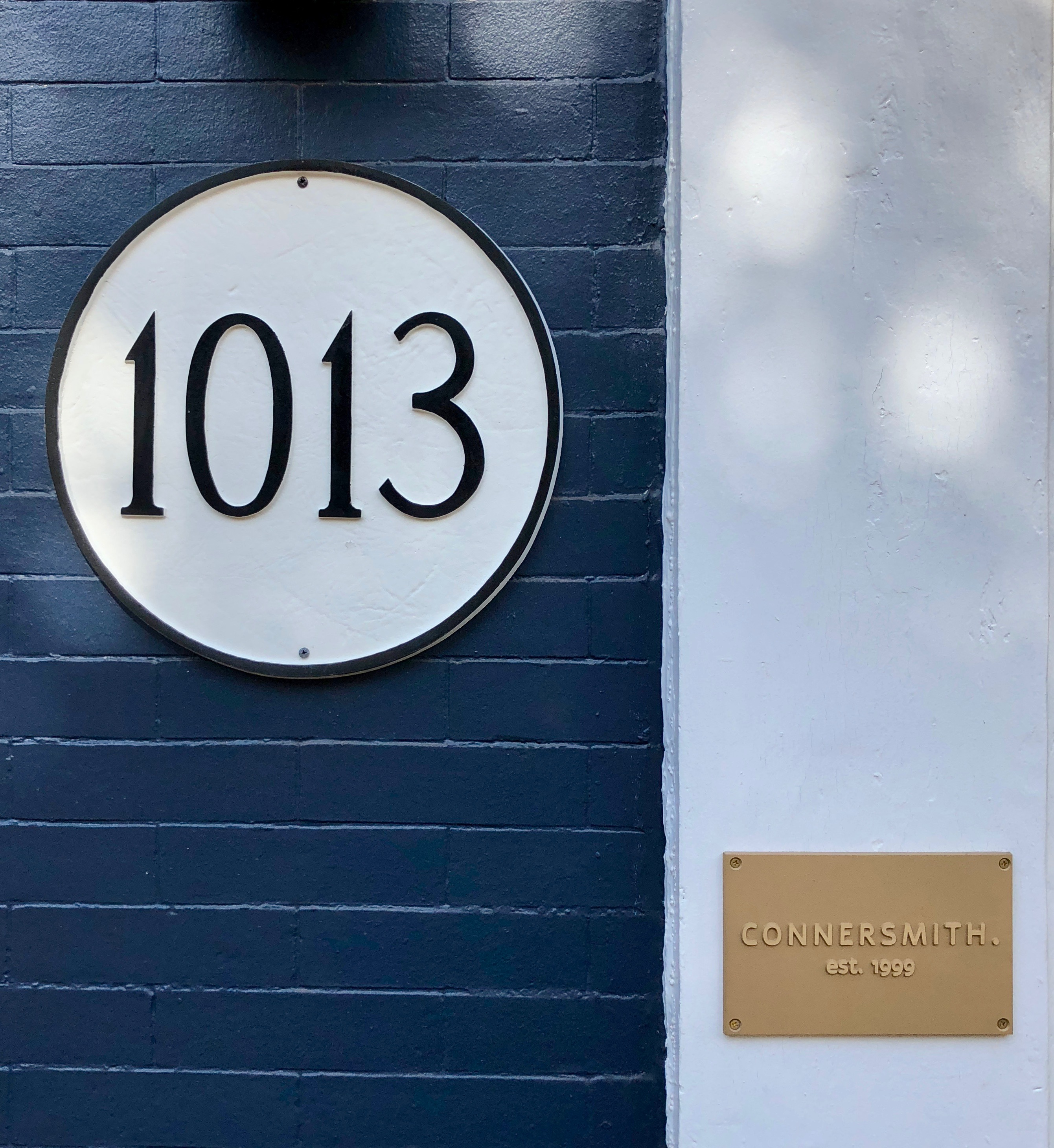
Exterior of the gallery

Connersmith is an art gallery in Washington, DC, owned and founded by Leigh Conner and Jamie Smith.

== History ==
CONNERSMITH, (originally Conner Contemporary Art), was founded in 1999. The gallery, initially located in Dupont Circle, moved to the Atlas Arts District in 2007 and to the Shaw Historic District in 2015.

CONNERSMITH specializes in contemporary art and post war painting, including Washington Color painting of the 1950s and 1960s.

CONNERSMITH participates in international art fairs, which have included The Armory Show, Art Brussels, ARCO, EXPO Chicago, ZONA MACO, and UNTITLED Miami Beach.

CONNERSMITH hosts Academy, an annual invitational group exhibition featuring works by students and graduates of college art programs in the greater Washington, DC region. Jamie Smith founded CONNERSMITH's Academy exhibition in 2001.

== Artists ==
CONNERSMITH has hosted exhibitions of works by many contemporary artists, including: Leo Villareal, Erik Thor Sandberg, Janet Biggs, Joe Ovelman, Julie Roberts, Kenny Hunter, Maria Friberg, Susan MacWilliam, Francis Ruyter and Wilmer Wilson IV. The gallery has also presented historical exhibitions featuring works by Morris Louis, Alma Thomas, Gene Davis, Howard Mehring, and Thomas Downing.
