= SS John Randolph =

Liberty ship of WWII

History

United States
- Name: John Randolph
- Namesake: John Randolph
- Owner: War Shipping Administration (WSA)
- Operator: Waterman Steamship Corp.
- Ordered: as type (EC2-S-C1) hull, MCE hull 19
- Awarded: 14 March 1941
- Builder: Bethlehem-Fairfield Shipyard, Baltimore, Maryland
- Cost: $1,354,256
- Yard number: 2006
- Way number: 6
- Laid down: 15 July 1941
- Launched: 30 December 1941
- Completed: 27 February 1942
- Identification: Call sign: KBMZ
- Fate: Sunk by Allied Naval mine, 5 July 1942

General characteristics
- Class & type: Liberty ship; type EC2-S-C1, standard
- Tonnage: 10,865 LT DWT; 7,176 GRT
- Displacement: 3,380 long tons (3,434 t) (light); 14,245 long tons (14,474 t) (max)
- Length: 441 feet 6 inches (135 m) oa; 416 feet (127 m) pp; 427 feet (130 m) lwl
- Beam: 57 feet (17 m)
- Draft: 27 ft 9.25 in (8.4646 m)
- Installed power: 2 × Oil fired 450 °F (232 °C) boilers, operating at 220 psi (1,500 kPa); 2,500 hp (1,900 kW)
- Propulsion: 1 × triple-expansion steam engine, (manufactured by Worthington Pump & Machinery Corp, Harrison, New Jersey); 1 × screw propeller
- Speed: 11.5 knots (21.3 km/h; 13.2 mph)
- Capacity: 562,608 cubic feet (15,931 m^{3}) (grain); 499,573 cubic feet (14,146 m^{3}) (bale)
- Complement: 38–62 USMM; 21–40 USNAG
- Armament: Varied by ship; Bow-mounted 3-inch (76 mm)/50-caliber gun; Stern-mounted 4-inch (102 mm)/50-caliber gun; 2–8 × single 20-millimeter (0.79 in) Oerlikon anti-aircraft (AA) cannons and/or, 2–8 × 37-millimeter (1.46 in) M1 AA guns

SS John Randolph was a Liberty ship built in the United States during World War II. She was named after John Randolph, a planter and a Congressman from Virginia who served in the House of Representatives at various times between 1799 and 1833 and the Senate from 1825 to 1827. He was also Minister to Russia under President Andrew Jackson in 1830.

== Construction ==
John Randolph was laid down on 15 July 1941, under a Maritime Commission (MARCOM) contract, MCE hull 19, by the Bethlehem-Fairfield Shipyard, Baltimore, Maryland; and was launched on 30 December 1941.

== History ==
She was allocated to Union Sulphur & Oil Co., Inc., on 27 February 1942.

=== Sinking ===
John Randolph was severely damaged after striking an Allied mine on the night of 5 July 1942.

Having left Murmansk, on 27 June 1942, Convoy QP-13 encountered fog on 5 July 1942, north west of Iceland. Due to the overcast weather and poor visibility, about one mi (1.6 km), Commander Cubison, aboard the escort ship HMS Niger, ordered the convoy to form up in two columns, from five, to pass between Straumnes and the Northern Barrage minefield. At 20:00 Commander Cubison had estimated his location at 66°45′N 22°22′W and suggested that the convoy alter course to 222°. At 22:00 Niger mistook what was later identified as an iceberg for Iceland's North Cape, at a bearing of 150° and one mile range. Cubison ordered the convoy to change course to 270°. At 22:40 Niger exploded and sank with a heavy loss of life, this included Commander Cubison. The convoy had entered the minefield at this time and the merchant ships SS Heffron, SS Hybert, SS Massmar, and SS Rodina struck mines and were sunk, John Randolph and SS Exterminator were seriously damaged.

== Salvage efforts ==
The forepart was salved but broke tow on 1 September 1952, and was wrecked at Torrisdale Bay, Sutherland, Scotland, on 5 September.

Original wreck location: 66°39′N 22°33′W

Location of fore section: 58°32′N 4°15′W

== Bibliography ==
- "Bethlehem-Fairfield, Baltimore MD". www.ShipbuildingHistory.com. 14 August 2008.
- Maritime Administration. "John Randolph". Ship History Database Vessel Status Card. U.S. Department of Transportation, Maritime Administration.
- Davies, James (May 2004). "Specifications (As-Built)" (PDF). p. 23.
- "SS John Randolph".
- "USS Rhind (DD 404)".
- Sawyer, L.A.; Mitchell, W.H. (1970). The Liberty ships: the history of the 'Emergency' type cargo ships constructed in the United States during World War II. David & Charles. p. 42. ISBN 0715349074.
- "MHG23280 - John Randolph (Fore Part): Torrisdale Bay, Sutherland". Highland Historic Environment Record.
- "Record 167 in Wreck Details" (PDF). Highlands Regional Council Maritime Wrecks and Monuments Record. Archived from the original (PDF) on 26 February 2020.
