= Michael Petry =

American multi-media artist and author (born 1960)

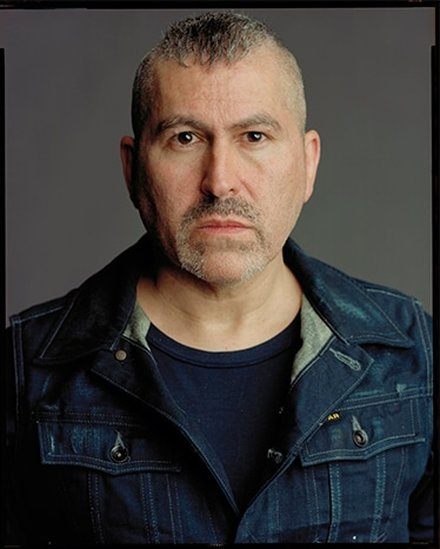
- Born: 1960 (age 65–66); El Paso, Texas
- Known for: Conceptual Art, Installation Art, Queer Theory
- Website: www.michaelpetry.net

Michael Petry (born 1960) is an American multi-media artist and author who lives and works in London. He is director of MOCA, London (Museum of Contemporary Art London), and co-founder of the Museum of Installation, also in London. He was formerly the Curator of the Royal Academy Schools Gallery, Guest Curator at the KunstAkademi, Oslo, and Research Fellow at the University of Wolverhampton.

== Life and work ==
Petry was born in El Paso, Texas, and has lived in London since 1981. Petry received a BA from Rice University (Houston), an MA from London Guildhall University, and a PhD in Arts from Middlesex University.

He is the Director of MOCA, London (the Museum of Contemporary Art) and a former curator of the Royal Academy Schools Gallery.

In 2009 Petry received a commission from The Ivy restaurant, London, to make a large scale glass installation called "The Network".

In 2010 Petry was chosen to be the first Artist in Residence at the Sir John Soane's Museum, London

In 2015 Petry headlined Rice University's Campbell Lecture Series. The program was entitled "The Trouble with Michael: Artist and Rice Alumni Michael Petry Discusses His 30 Years of Art Production," and involved three lectures: "Growing Up in Public" (April 7, 2015), "Reading a Life" (April 8, 2015) and "The Art of Ethics" (April 9, 2015). A coinciding exhibition of Petry's work, At the Core of the Algorithm, was shown at Hiram Butler Gallery.

In 2012 Petry and Travis Barker entered a Civil Partnership at the London Borough of Southwark.

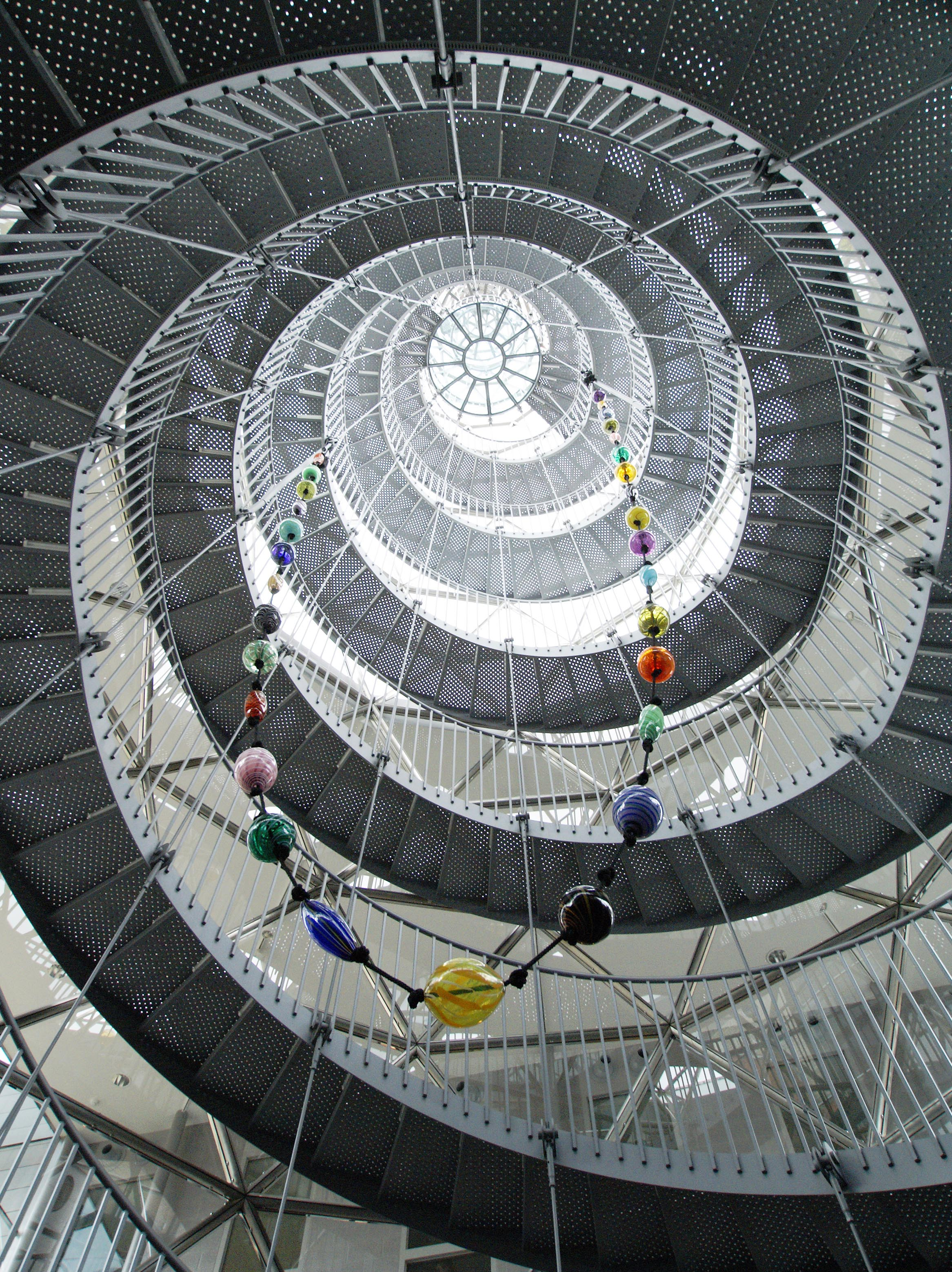
Petry's piece "The Treasure of Memory"

== Books ==
Petry co-authored Installation Art (Thames & Hudson, 1994), and Installation Art in the New Millennium (Thames & Hudson, 2003), and authored Abstract Eroticism (1996) and A Thing of Beauty is... (Academy Editions, 1997). The Trouble with Michael (ArtMedia Press, 2001) is a monograph of his artistic practice.

Petry's book Hidden Histories: 20th Century Same Sex Male Lovers in the Visual Arts (2004) accompanies the exhibition Hidden Histories he curated for The New Art Gallery Walsall. He documented the exhibition in The International Journal of Art & Design Education and to expand this for publication in Gender Sexuality, and Museums: A Routledge Reader edited by Amy K. Levin.

His book Golden Rain Volumes I & II is part of his project of the same name for Ha gamle prestegard's exhibition On the Edge for Stavanger 2008, European Capital of Culture. His work is included in the Contemporary Glass book by Black Dog Publishing. Petry's book The Art of Not Making: the new artist/artisan relationship (Thames & Hudson, 2011) looks at artists who have work produced for them by artisans.

Petry's 2013 book Nature Morte: Contemporary Artists Reinvigorate the Still Life Tradition (Thames & Hudson) revealed how leading artists of the 21st century are reinvigorating the still life, a genre previously synonymous with the 16th- and 17th-century Old Masters. Nature Morte was adapted into a touring exhibition which visited several European galleries and museums.

He has also contributed chapters to various books and journals, including Pornographic Art and the Aesthetics of Pornography (Palgrave Macmillan, 2013), Sculpture and Touch (Routledge, 2014) and Global Mobilities: Refugees, Exiles and Immigrants in Museums and Archives (Routledge, 2016).

In Petry's 2018 book, ''The Word is Art'' (Thames & Hudson) he asserts the value of text in art by examining the use of text by artists from around the world, including Bruce Nauman, Julien Breton, Jeremy Deller, Takashi Murakami, Tracey Emin, Christian Boltanski, Joe Ovelman, Jenny Holzer, Ed Ruscha, Glenn Ligon and more.

Petry also writes regularly for The Huffington Post..

== Exhibitions ==
- Laughing at Time, Ha gamle prestegard, Norway, 2000
- Hidden Histories: 20th Century Male Same Sex Lovers in the Visual Arts, New Art Gallery Walsall, 2004
- America the Beautiful, Sundaram Tagore Gallery, 2007
- Glasswear, Museum of Arts and Design, New York, 2009
- Glasstress II, 54th Venice Biennale, Venice, Italy, 2011.
- Michael Petry: The Touch of the Oracle, Palm Springs Art Museum, Palm Springs, CA, 2012.
- AT the Core of the Algorithm, installation for British Glass, Glazenhuis, Lommel, Belgium, 2014
- Frontiers Reimagined, Museo di Palazzo Grimani, Official Collateral Event as part of the 56th International Art Exhibition of la Biennale di Venezia, 2015
- A Twist in Time, solo exhibition at Pallant House Gallery, 2016
- At The Foot of the Gods, installation for the Biënnale Oosterhou, Holland, 2017
- The WORD, an exhibition curated by Petry for Helsinki Contemporary, Helsinki, 2017
- In the Realm of the Gods, an exhibition at the Holburne Museum, Bath, 2017–2018
- The Genie, an exhibition at the The Heath Robinson Museum, London, Nov26 - Mar27

=== The Art of Not Making ===
Petry's book The Art of Not Making: The New Artist/Artisan Relationship was adapted into a series of exhibitions which Petry curated: The Fabricated Object, Sumarria Lunn Gallery, London, 2012; The Art of Not Making, Ha gamle prestegard, Norway, 2013.

=== Nature Morte ===
Nature Morte: Contemporary Artists Reinvigorate the Still Life Tradition, Petry's 2013 book was adapted into a touring exhibition which was presented at Ha gamle prestegard, Norway, 2015; Konsthallen-Bohusläns Museum, Sweden, 2016; National Museum, Wrocław, Poland, 2017; The Guildhall Art Gallery, London, 2017–18.

== Collections ==
Petry's work is held in the following public collections:

- Museum of Arts and Design, New York City
- Museum of Fine Arts, Houston
- Toledo Museum of Art
- British Museum, London
- The National Collection, UK
- Kunst- und Ausstellungshalle der Bundesrepublik Deutschland, Bonn, Germany
- Bellerive Museum, Zurich
- The New Art Gallery Walsall, UK
- Rogaland Kunstmuseum, Stavanger, Norway
- The Gallery of Art, Legnica, Poland
- Leopold Hoesch Museum, Düren, Germany
