= Kenny Hunter =

Scottish sculptor (born 1962)

- Born: 1962 (age 63–64)
- Education: Glasgow School of Art
- Known for: Sculpture

Kenny Hunter (born 1962) is a Scottish sculptor. He lives and works in Edinburgh. Between 2015 and 2018, he was programme director of sculpture at Edinburgh College of Art where he now continues to work part-time as a lecturer in Fine Art, Sculpture.

== Biography ==
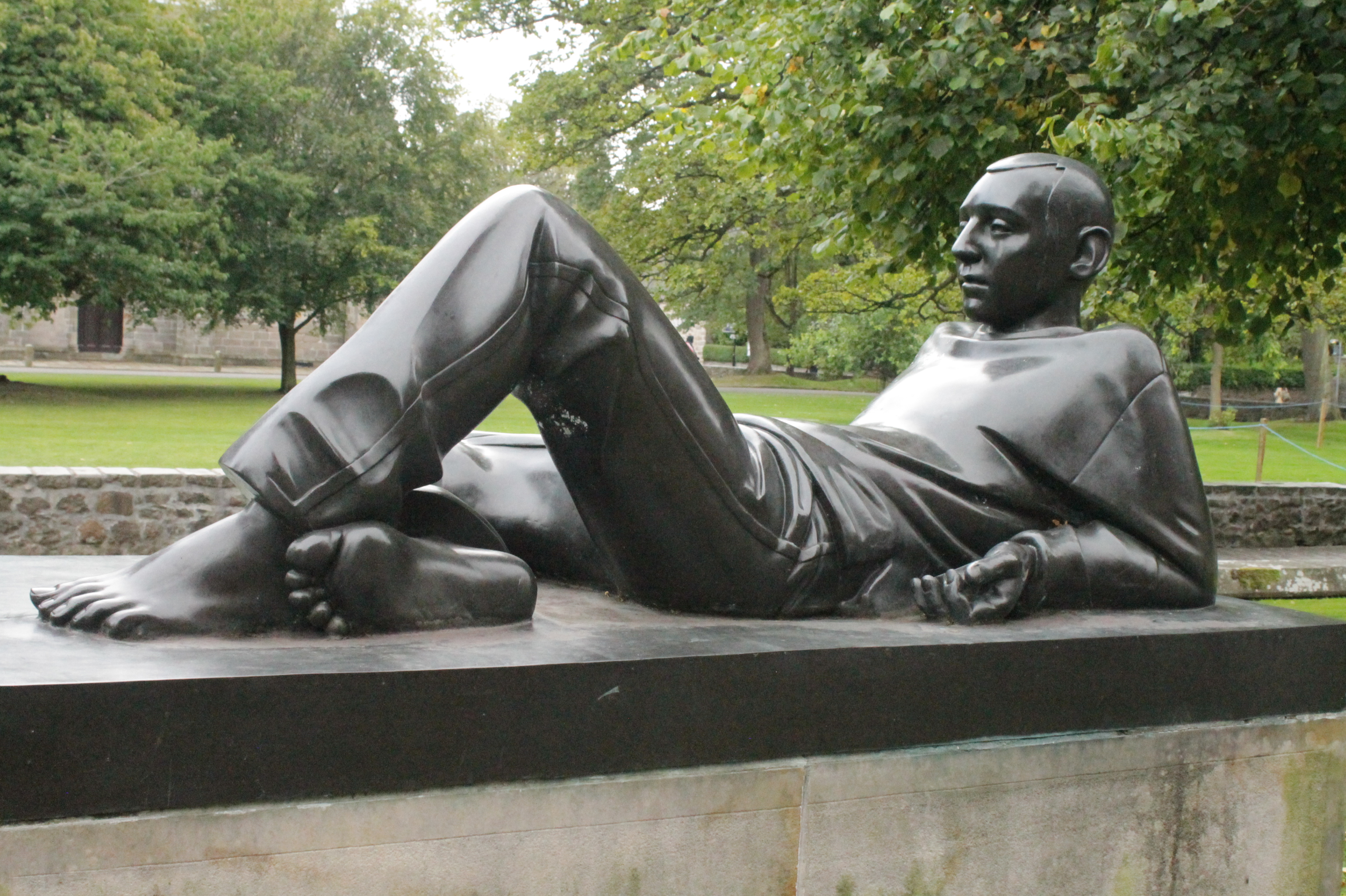
Youth with Split Apple by Kenny Hunter, King's College, Aberdeen

Born in Edinburgh, Hunter graduated from Glasgow School of Art in 1987 and thereafter studied classical sculpture at the British School at Athens.

Hunter makes monumental civic sculpture, he also makes gallery-based work and has exhibited at the Scottish National Portrait Gallery (including a bust of Jimmy Reid), the Centre for Contemporary Arts, the Yorkshire Sculpture Park, Tramway Glasgow, Galerie Scheffel in Germany and at Conner Contemporary Art, Washington, among others in the UK and Internationally.

According to his profile at GENERATION, "Kenny Hunter makes elegant sculptures in many materials including wood, plastic, iron and bronze. He remains fascinated by the processes involved in making sculpture in the studio and the power that they have to transform materials in order to express his complex and vivid ideas on historical time."

== Public art works ==
Perhaps Hunter's most well-recognised piece of public art in Scotland is Citizen Firefighter in Gordon Street, Glasgow. It was commissioned in 2001 for Strathclyde Fire & Rescue and due to its location on a busy corner near Glasgow Central station it is passed by hundreds of office workers every day.

Other permanent public works :

- Blackbird (the persistence of vision), Leicester Square, London (2016)
- A place is a space remembered, Maison du Site des Deux-Caps, France (2015)
- Elephant for Glasgow, Bellahouston Park, Glasgow, UK (2015)
- Portrait of Andrew Grant, Edinburgh College of Art, UK (2015)
- Black Swan, Eschborn, Germany (2014)
- The Watcher, The Scottish Seabird Centre, North Berwick, East Lothian, UK (2014)
- Hawk / Creation, Mytholmroyd, West Yorkshire, UK (2013)
- Stand Easy, Leicestershire County Council Armed Services Memorial, UK (2012)
- The Unknown, Borgie Forest, Sutherland, UK (2012)
- Patrick Geddes Monument, The Scottish Storytelling Centre, Edinburgh, UK (2012)
- The Barnsley Mining Artwork, Barnsley Interchange, Barnsley, UK (2012)
- Liberty Regain'd, The Robert Burns Birthplace Museum, Alloway, UK (2012)
- Second Glance at a Roe Deer, Orchard Park, Cambridge, UK (2011)
- I Goat, Bishops Square, Spitalfields, London (2011)
- Monument to a Mouse, The Robert Burns Birthplace Museum, Alloway, UK (2010)
- We Adapt, Victoria Street, Rutherglen, UK (2009)
- Red Boy, Bad Homburg, Germany (2008)
- Mademoiselle de Fives, Place Degeyter, Fives, Lille, France (2007)
- Natural Selection, Great Ormond Street Hospital, London (2006)
- Lamb, Whitefriars, Canterbury, UK (2005)
- Youth With Split Apple outside King's College at the University of Aberdeen (2005)
- Girl with Rucksack, Gorbals, Glasgow (2004)
- Calf, at the old Meat Market on Gallowgate, Calton in Glasgow (2000)
- King of the Castle / Boy Wonder, Castlemilk, Glasgow (2000)
- Four Children in the pedestrianised area of Hamilton town centre (1998)
- Cherub/Skull at the Tron Theatre in Glasgow (1998)
- Your Next Breath at the Royal College of Surgeons of Edinburgh (2022). Won the 2023 Marsh Award for Excellence in Public Sculpture.

== Selected exhibitions ==
- Reproductive, Edinburgh Sculpture Workshop, Edinburgh Art Festival (2016)
- Kontrapunkt, GENERATION, House for an Art Lover, Glasgow (2014)
- The Singing of Swans, GENERATION, Paxton House, Berwick Upon Tweed (2014)
- Nothing Lasts Forever, CONNERSMITH, Washington DC, USA (2012)
- Then The Animals Said God, Galerie Scheffel, Germany (2012)

== Gallery ==
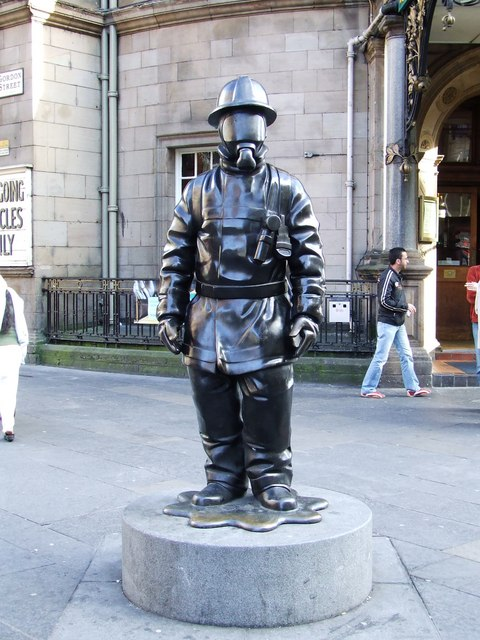
Citizen Firefighter, Central Station, Glasgow (2001)

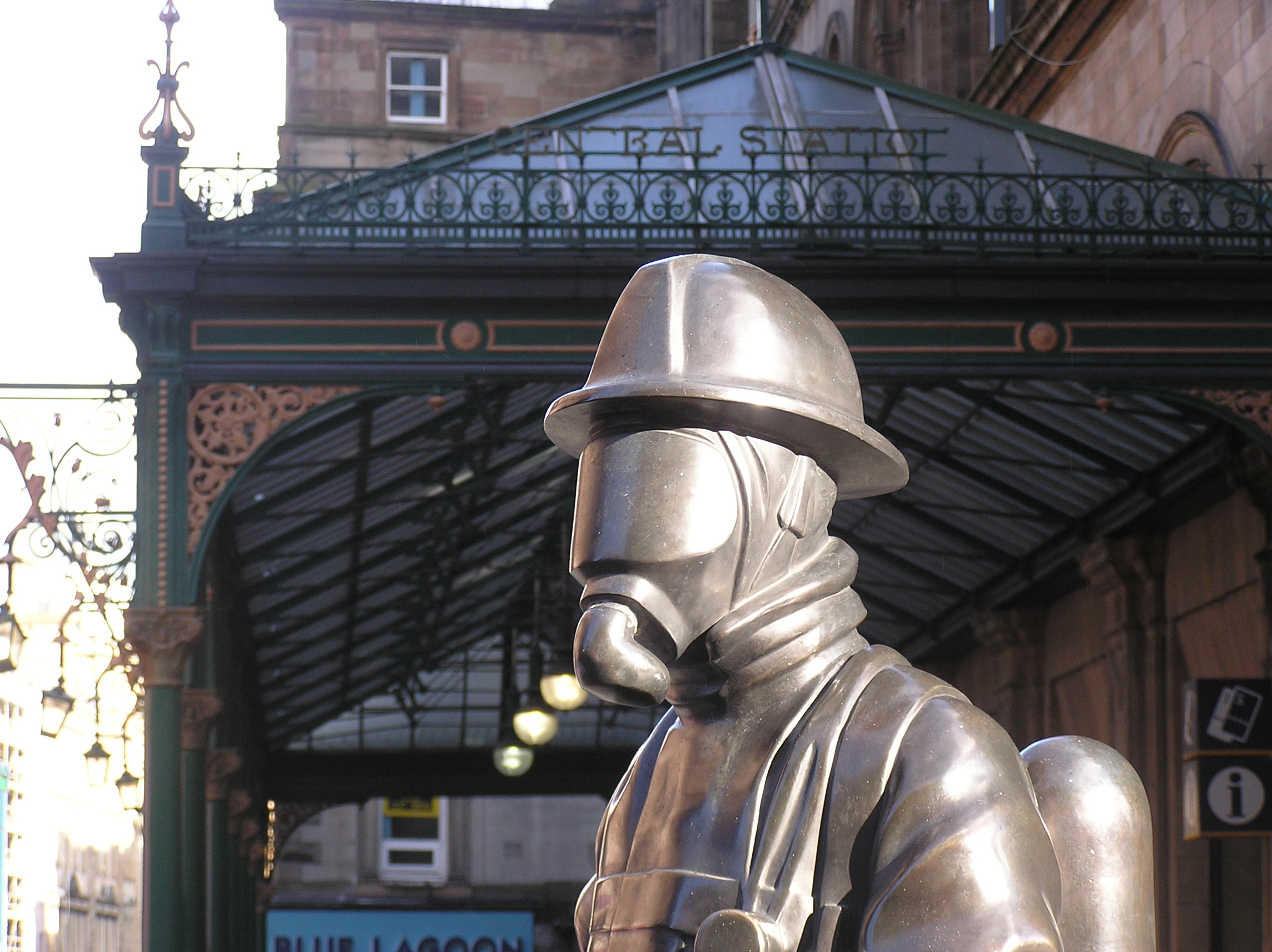
Citizen Firefighter, Central Station, Glasgow (2001)

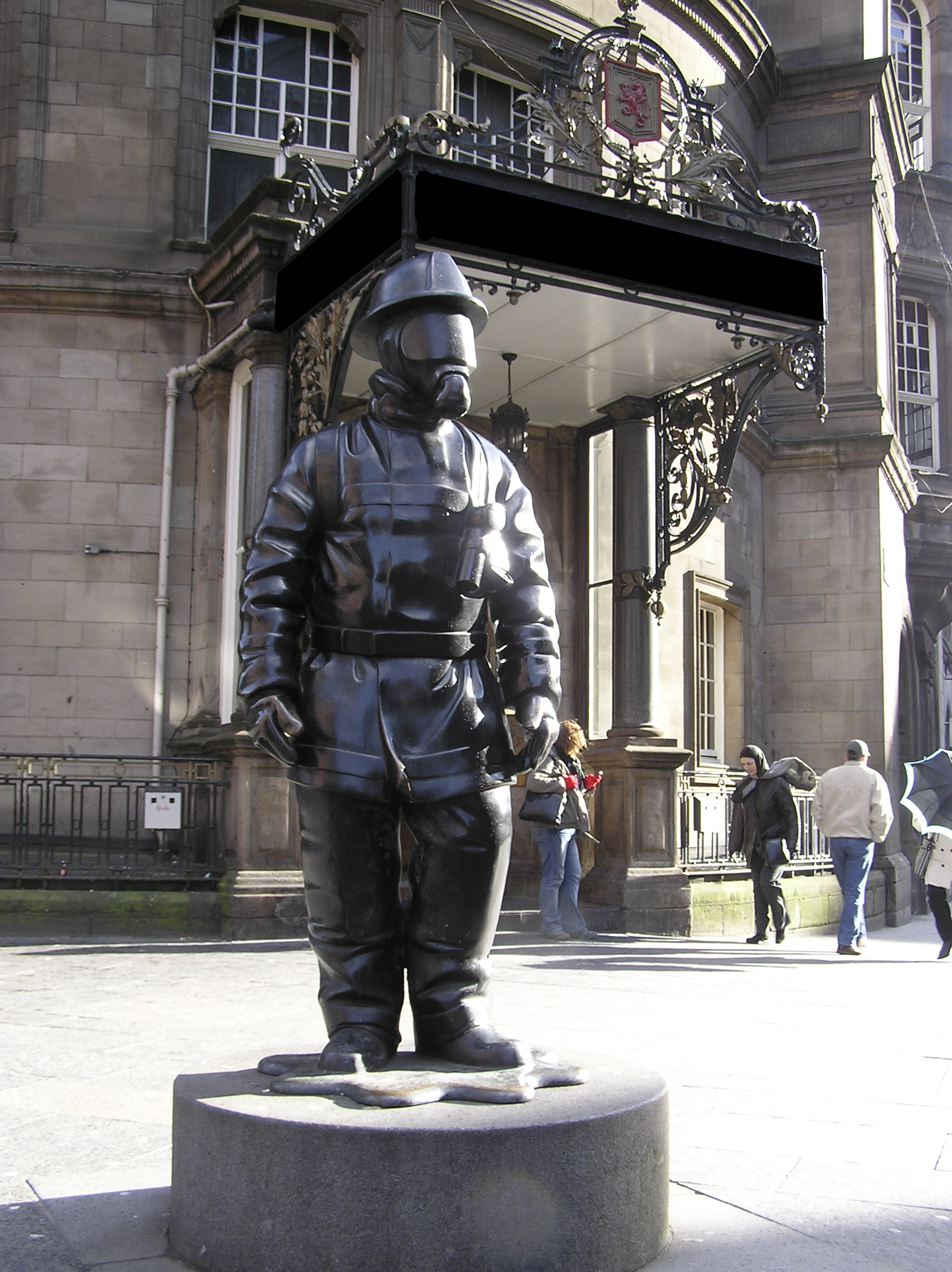
Citizen Firefighter, Central Station, Glasgow (2001)

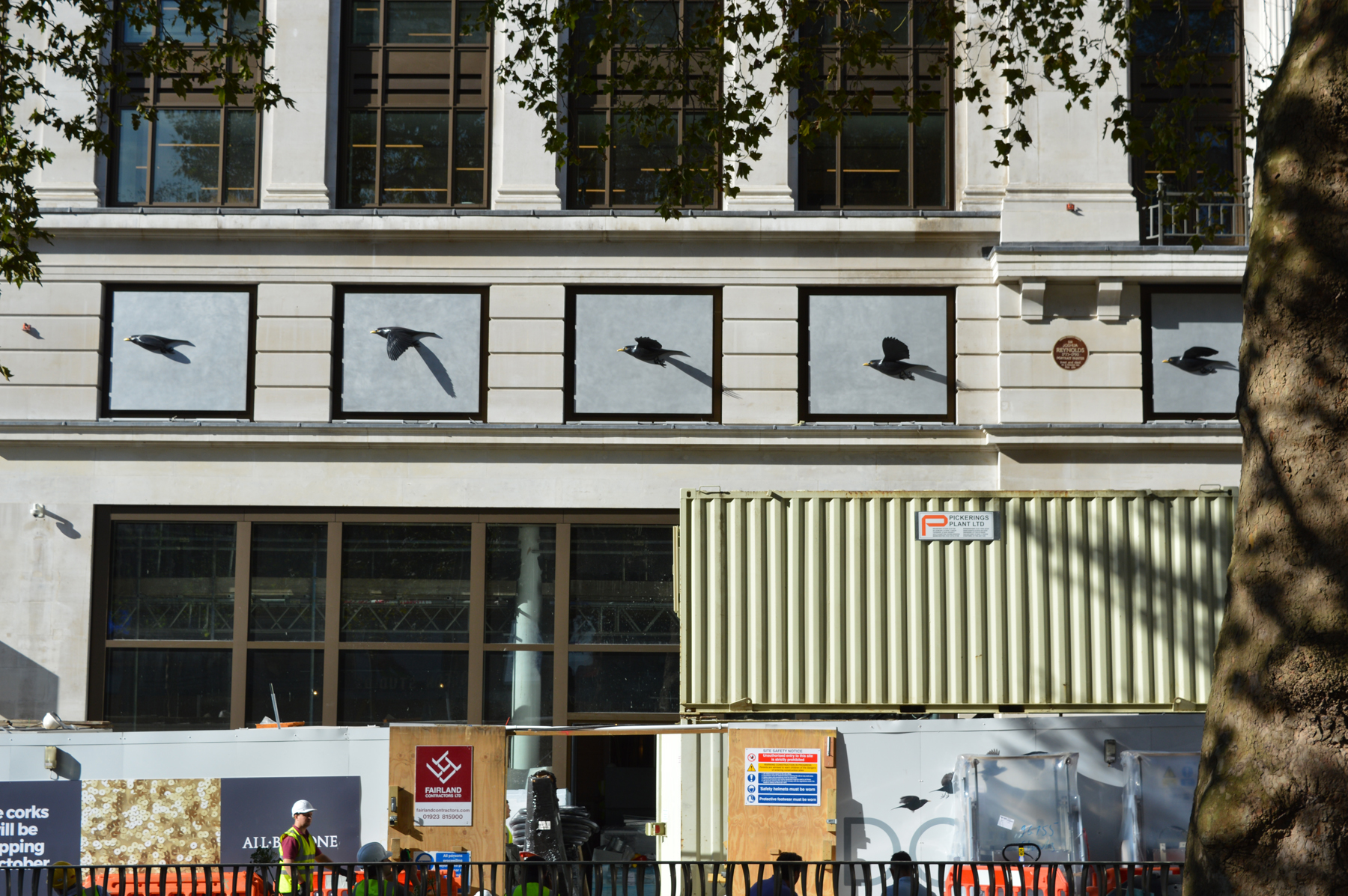
Blackbird (The Persistence of Vision) Leicester Square, London (2016)

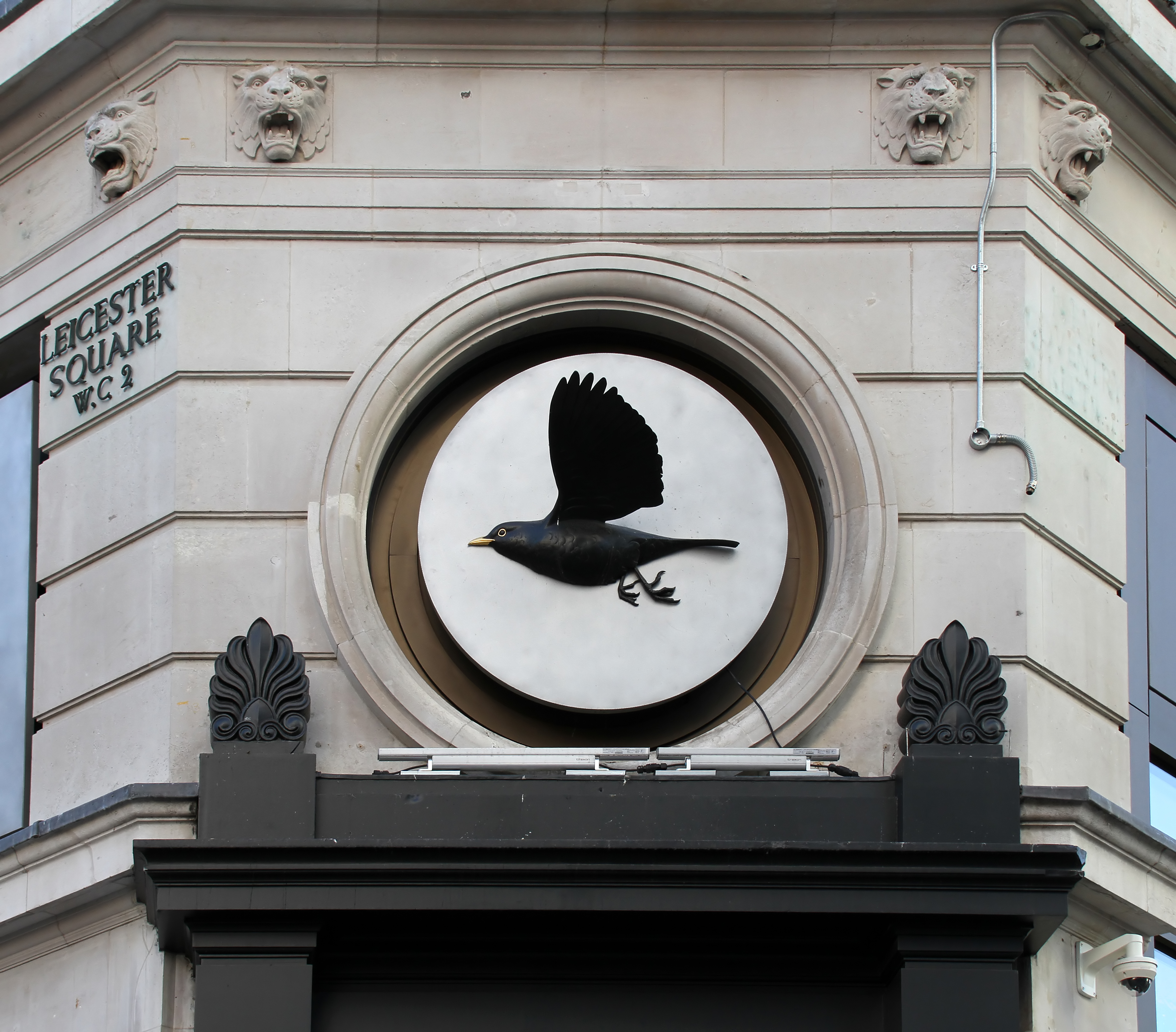
Blackbird (The Persistence of Vision) Leicester Square, London (2016)

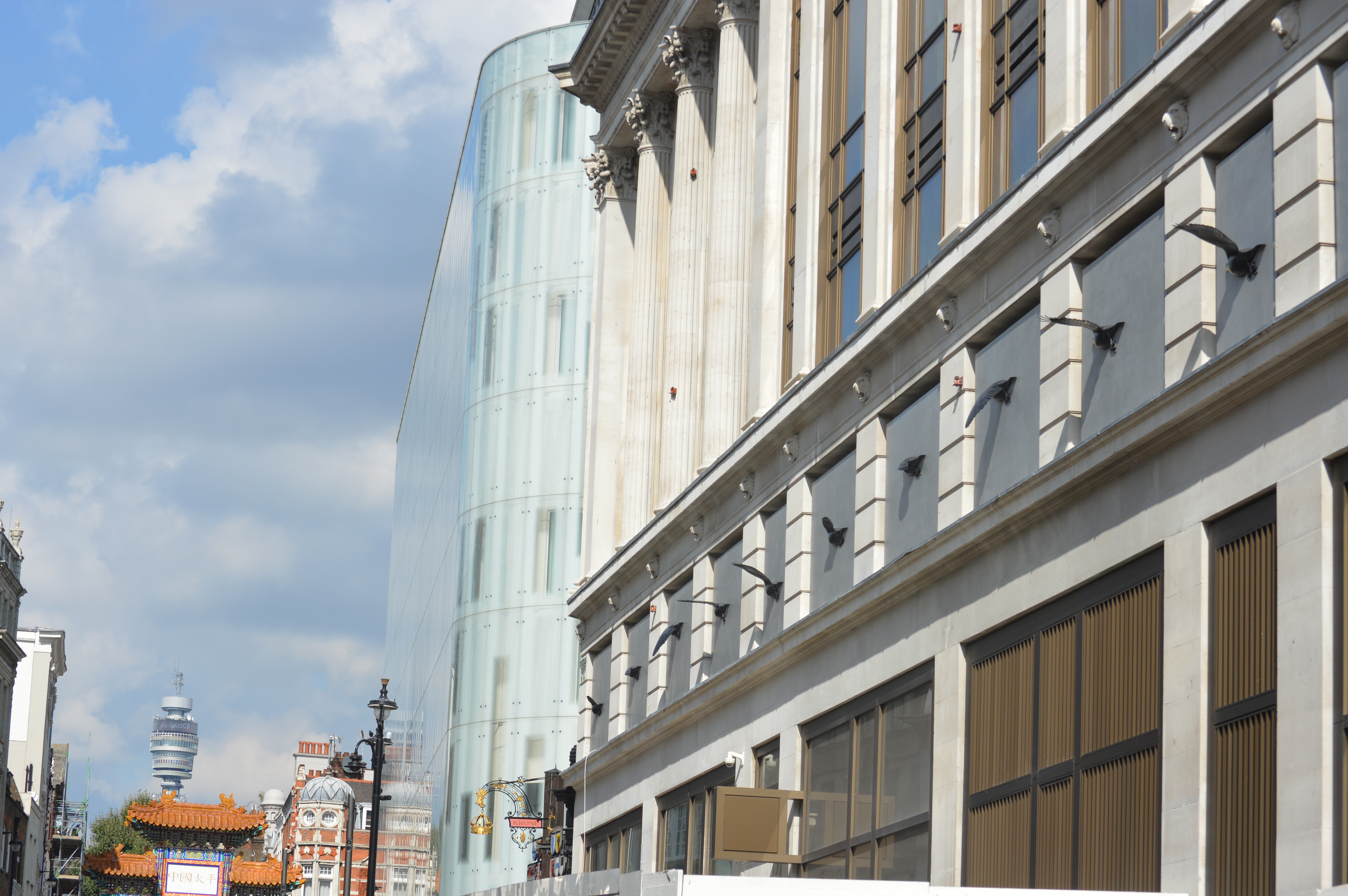
Blackbird (The Persistence of Vision) Leicester Square, London (2016)

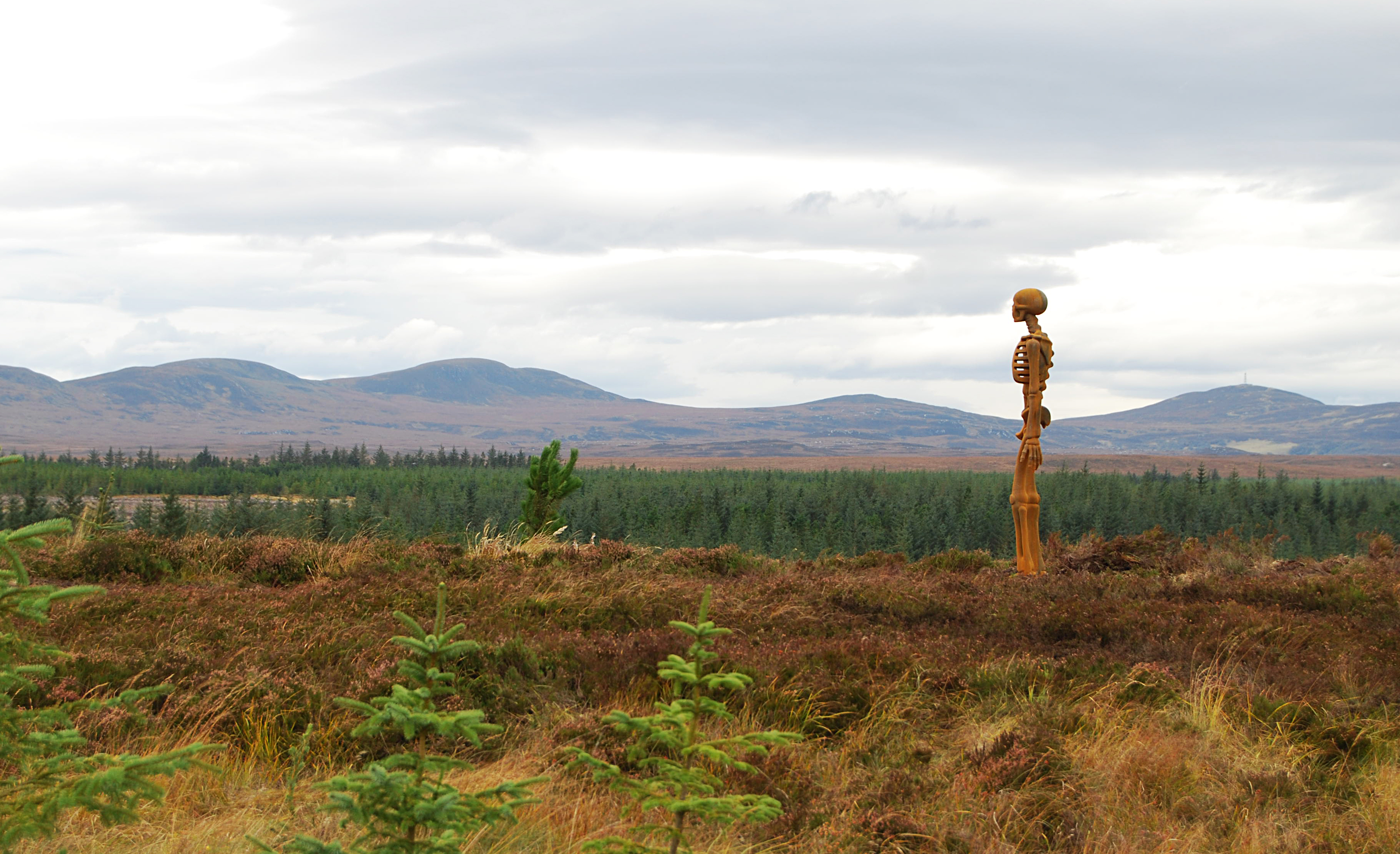
The Unknown, Borgie Forest, Sutherland, UK (2012)

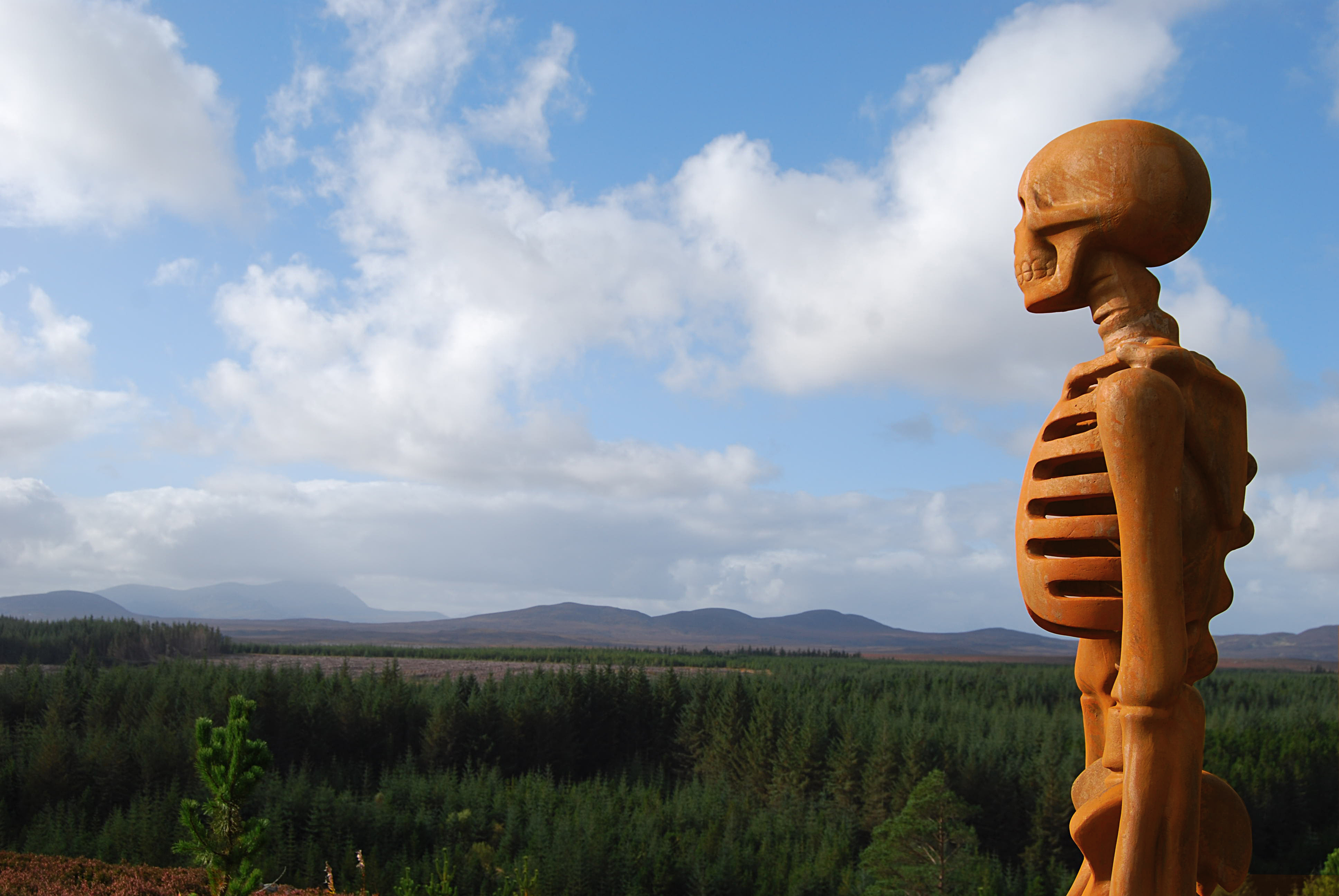
The Unknown, Borgie Forest, Sutherland (2012)

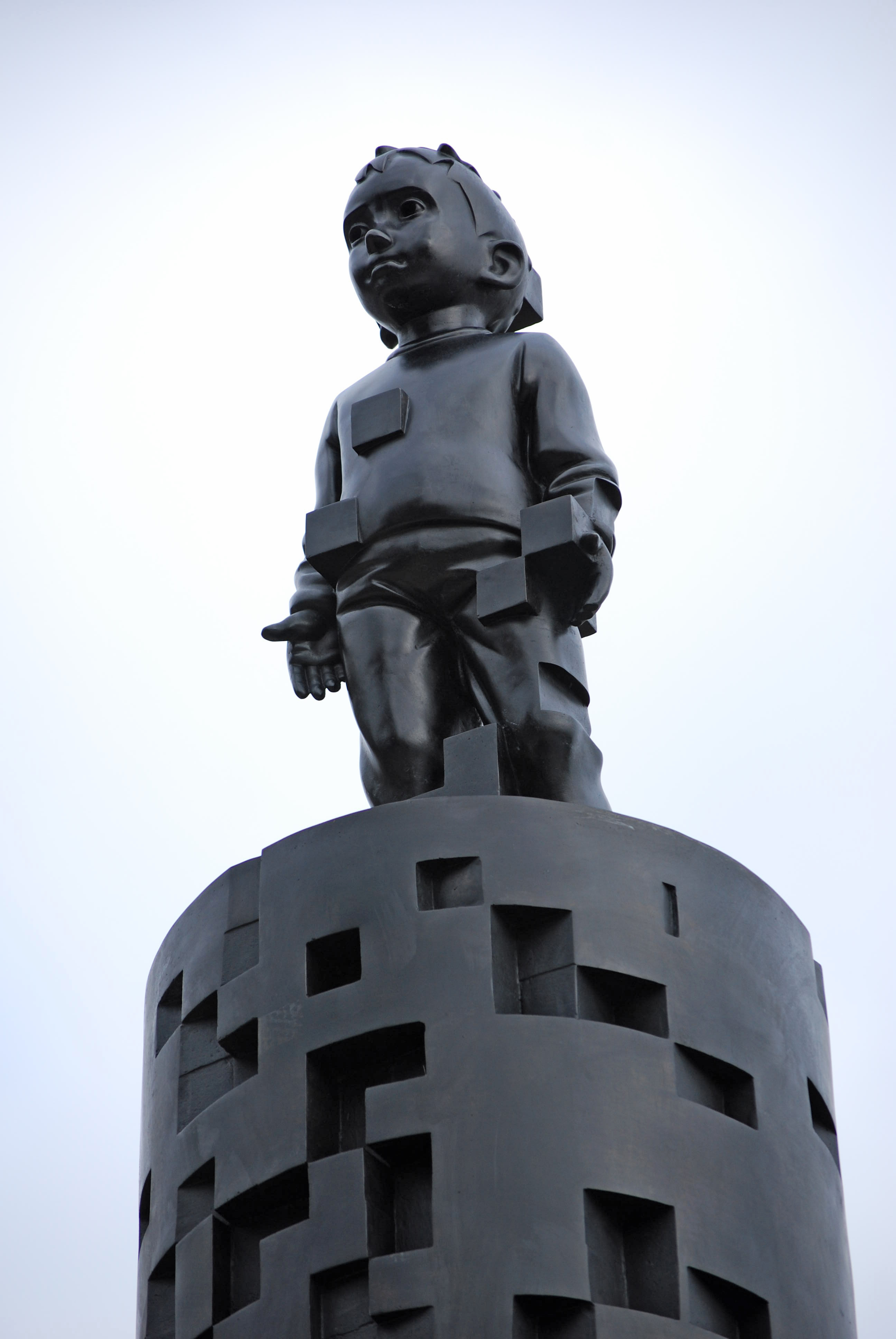
The Barnsley Mining Artwork, Barnsley Interchange, UK (2012)

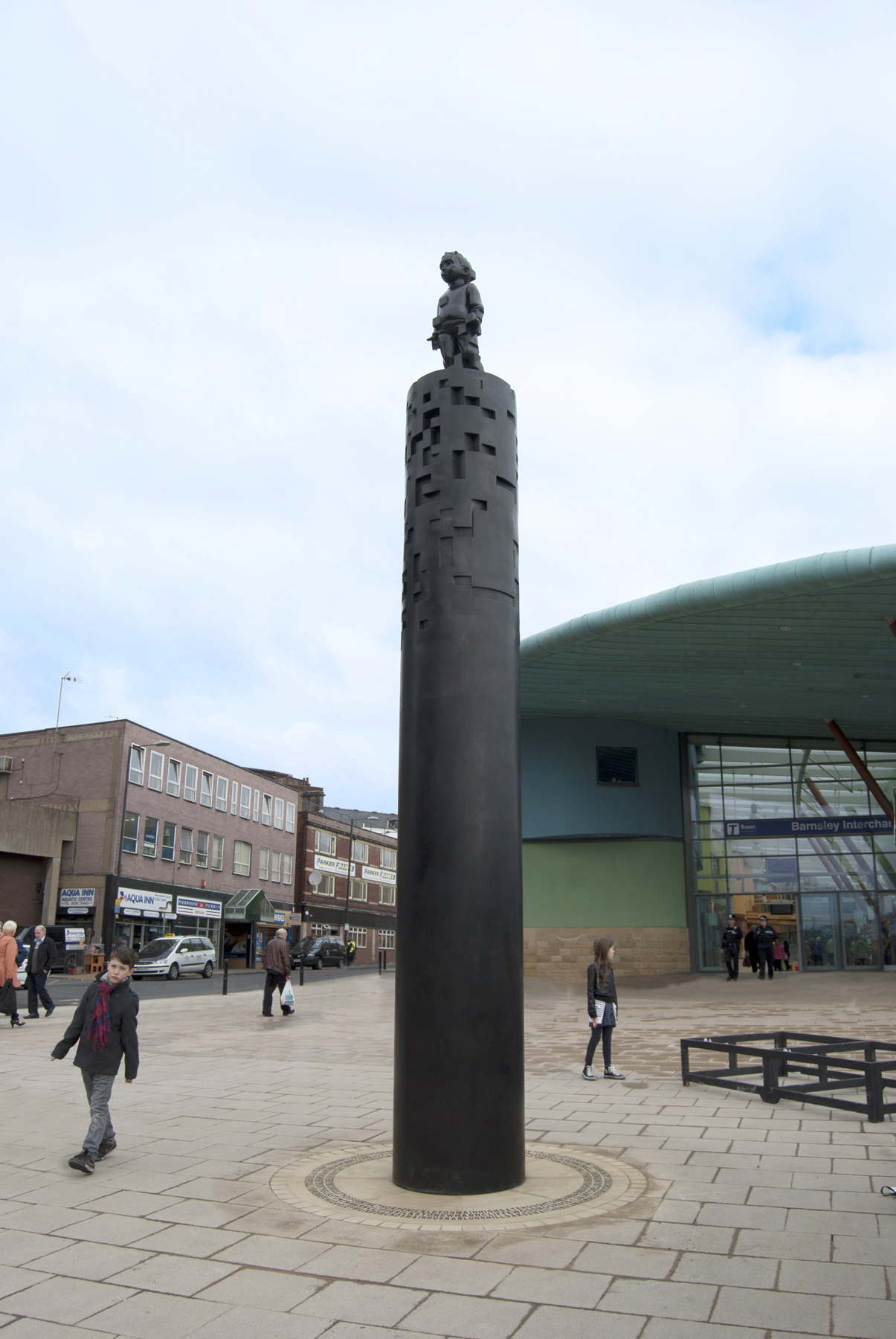
The Barnsley Mining Artwork, Barnsley Interchange, UK (2012)

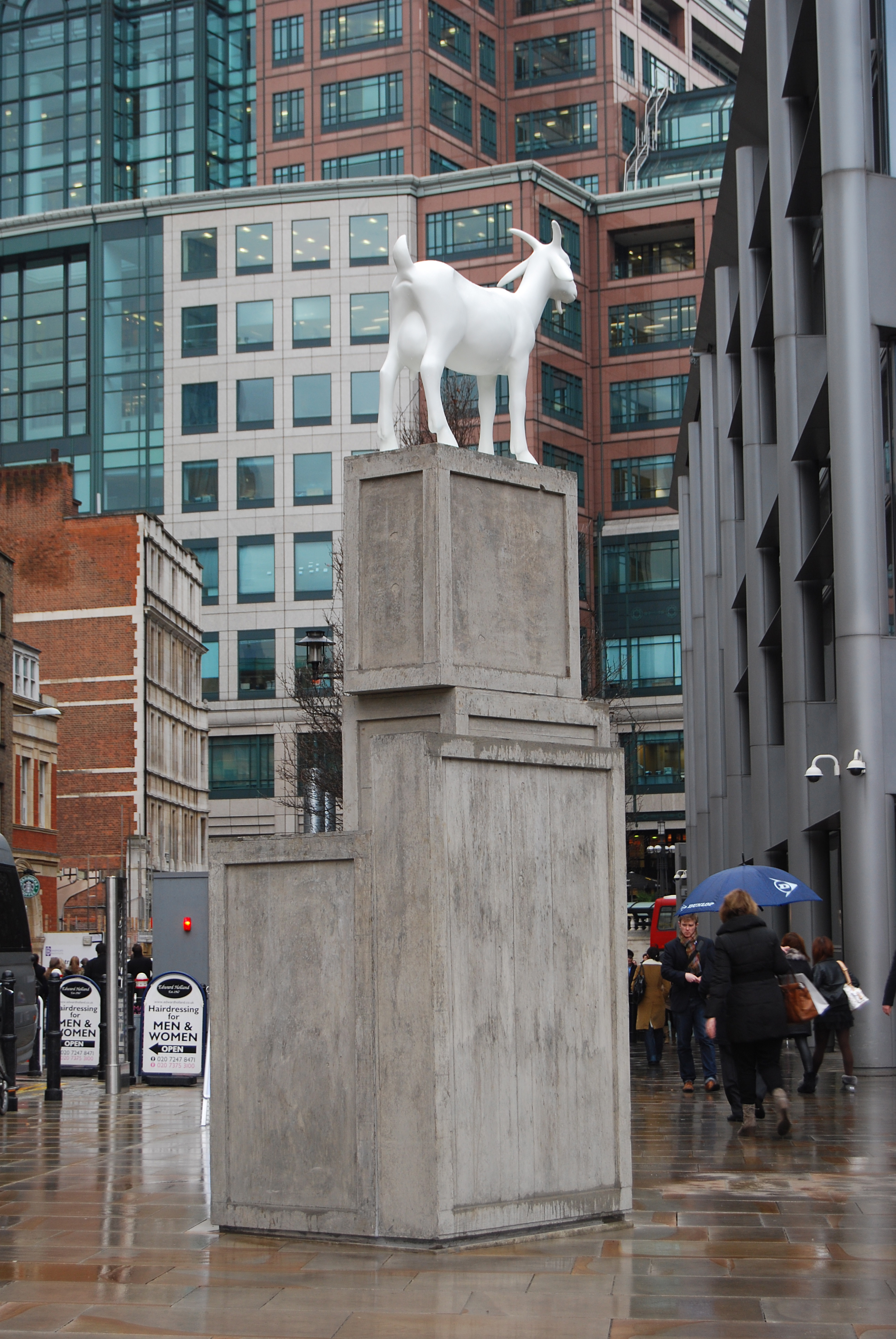
I Goat, Bishops Square, Spitalfields, London (2011)
