= Borgie =

Coordinates: 58.49°N 04.28°W

Borgie: Scottish Gaelic: Borghaidh
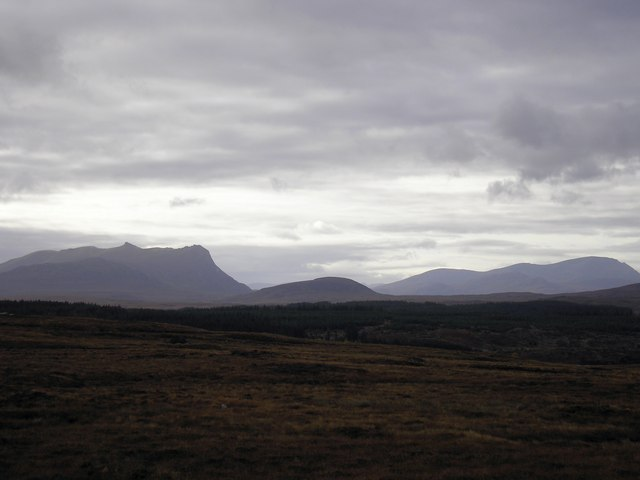
- Moorland near Borgie

- Location within the Sutherland area
- OS grid reference: NC6759
- Council area: Highland
- Lieutenancy area: Sutherland
- Country: Scotland
- Sovereign state: United Kingdom
- Police: Scotland
- Fire: Scottish
- Ambulance: Scottish

Borgie (Scottish Gaelic: Borghaidh) is a hamlet in Sutherland, Highland, Scotland. Historically it was part of the 12,600-acre (5,100-hectare) Tongue estate with shooting rights, and it contains the Borgie Lodge, now a bed and breakfast. Borgie is noted for its salmon, which are caught in the nearby River Borgie.

The hamlet was affected by the Highland Clearances, the cleared crofting village being resettled in the early 20th century.

== Geography ==
Borgie is 1 1/2 miles (2.5 kilometres) south of Torrisdale, 7.6 mi (12.2 km) northeast of Tongue and 36.8 mi (59.2 km) west of Thurso by road. To the south, the North Coast 500 runs along the A836 road.

=== River Borgie ===
The River Borgie begins as the outflow of Loch Slaim, which is the last in a chain of four lochs to the east of Ben Loyal, the largest being Loch Loyal. It flows for seven miles across blanket bog, through Borgie Forest, and past the east of Borgie to empty into the Atlantic at Torrisdale Bay.

The river is a popular site for salmon fishing, with 50 named pools and an average of just under 300 fish caught and released per year.

Both the river and its upper catchment (West Borgie) are Sites of Special Scientific Interest, and the river is designated a Special Area of Conservation. As well as the salmon, which are important commercially as well as ecologically, the area supports otters, trout, birds and protected molluscs. The catchment is also noted for its geology.

Near Borgie, the river passes under the only road bridges along its length, the current A836 bridge and the disused Borgie Bridge, and is joined by tributaries Allt Borgidh Beag ("Little Borgie stream") and Allt an Ruigh Ruaidh.

=== Borgie Forest ===
To the south of the hamlet is a forested area known variously as Borgie Forest, Borgie Wood, Borgie Breco/Glen and The Millennium Forest. The area was replanted in 1942 after a forest fire and later restored under the Millennium Forest for Scotland project, which looked to develop natural areas for the turn of the New Millennium. It has been managed since 2019 by Forestry and Land Scotland.

The forest is primarily a Sitka spruce plantation but also contains mature Scots pine and a selection of deciduous trees, which were planted to encourage visitors and increase biodiversity.

The River Borgie divides the Forest into Borgie Breco (formerly signposted simply as "Borgie") on the west and Borgie Glen on the east. The nearest bridge is on the nearby A836, necessitating separate access roads for the two sides. Both sides have public car parks and signposted woodland walks.

A hilltop clearing in Borgie Glen was chosen by Kenny Hunter as the location for his sculpture, The Unknown, which he wanted to place in a "remote" and changing landscape, such as a commercial forest.

== Landmarks ==
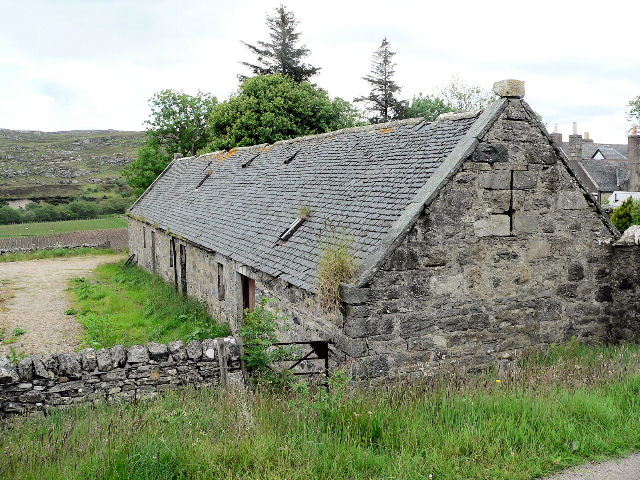
An old barn, an outbuilding of Borgie Lodge

The hamlet contains the Borgie Lodge Hotel, a bed and breakfast with eight bedrooms, which was a hunting lodge during the Victorian period. The lodge has stag antlers on display, log fires and Sutherland tartan carpets, and contains the Naver Lounge restaurant.

To the south stands Borgie Bridge, a listed but no longer used 19th century arch bridge.
