= Loch Ailsh =

Loch in Highland, Scotland

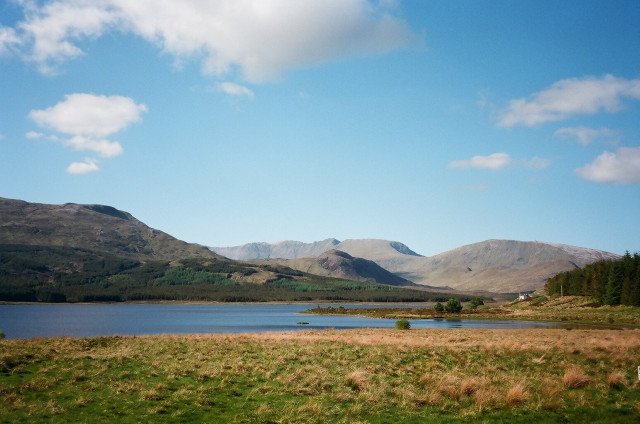
- Loch Ailsh from its south shore, with Ben More Assynt in the background

- Location within Sutherland
- Location: Scottish Highlands
- Coordinates: 58°03′18″N 4°51′25″W
- Primary inflows: River Oykel, Allt na Cailliche
- Primary outflows: River Oykel
- Basin countries: Scotland, United Kingdom
- Max. length: 1.46 km (0.91 mi)
- Max. width: 1.42 km (0.88 mi)
- Surface elevation: 150 m (490 ft)

Loch Ailsh is a freshwater loch in Sutherland, Scotland, located 2.6km northeast of the A837. It sits on the River Oykel among plantation woodland.

The loch's name likely derives from the same Scottish Gaelic root as Loch Alsh, Loch Aillse, meaning "foaming lake".

Benmore Lodge, a holiday cottage, sits on a sandy beach at the loch's northeast end. A chambered cairn, dating from the Neolithic period, lies just south of the loch, on the west bank of the River Oykel.

Loch Ailsh is part of a Site of Special Scientific Interest and one of the Scottish Environment Protection Agency's designated protected areas, meaning any fish caught on the loch must be returned. It is a key breeding site for the UK's population of black-throated diver. It is considered to be relatively oligotrophic.
