= Torrisdale, Sutherland =

Coordinates: 58.52194°N 4.27437°W

Torrisdale: Scottish Gaelic: Tòrrasdal
- Location within the Sutherland area
- OS grid reference: NC676615
- Council area: Highland
- Lieutenancy area: Sutherland
- Country: Scotland
- Sovereign state: United Kingdom
- Post town: Thurso
- Postcode district: KW14 7
- Police: Scotland
- Fire: Scottish
- Ambulance: Scottish

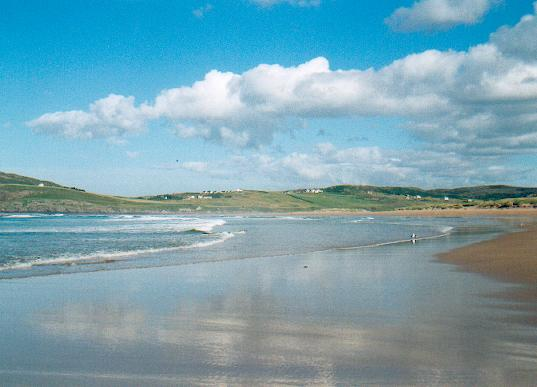
Torrisdale Beach

Torrisdale is a remote hamlet on the western shore of Torrisdale Bay in Sutherland, Highland, on the north coast of Scotland. It is 3 kilometres (2 mi) west of Bettyhill.

On 5 May 1942, the American Liberty ship SS John Randolph struck a mine en route from northern Russia to Iceland. The forepart was salved but broke tow on 1 September 1952 and was wrecked at Torrisdale Bay on 5 September, where the wreckage remains on the beach and is uncovered at low tide.
