= World of Art =

Illustrated book series published by Thames & Hudson

- Author: Various authors
- Country: United Kingdom
- Language: English
- Discipline: Art history
- Publisher: Thames & Hudson
- Published: 1958–present
- Media type: Print (hardcover & paperback)
- No. of books: More than 300
- OCLC: 150179006

Evolution of the cover design. 1, Herbert Read's A Concise History of Modern Painting, originally published in 1959 in the series, which became a foundational text for art students everywhere. 2, Michael Levey's A Concise History of Painting: From Giotto to Cézanne. 3, Whitney Chadwick's Women, Art, and Society. 4, Richard J. Powell's Black Art and Culture in the 20th Century. 5, Patrick Waldberg's Surrealism. 6, James H. Rubin's Monet.

World of Art (formerly known as The World of Art Library) is a long established series of pocket-sized art books from the British publisher Thames & Hudson, comprising over 300 titles as of 2021. The books are typically around 200 pages, but heavily illustrated. Unlike some concise or popular art books, the layout is traditional with text and pictures often on the same page, but segregated. The series was launched in 1958, and over 300 titles have been published in all; according to Christopher Frayling, former Principal of the Royal College of Art, "there are paint-stained copies in every art school in the land".

The World of Art series treats all subjects concerning the arts, but mostly art history, ranging from prehistoric cave art to contemporary art, from Graeco-Roman and Viking art to Central Asian and Japanese art, from academic art to outsider art. Perhaps the most classic book in the series is A Concise History of Painting: From Giotto to Cézanne by Michael Levey (of the National Gallery in London), originally published in 1962 (ISBN 0-500-20024-6). This gives an authoritative introduction to European art history from the early use of perspective in Italy to the start of modern art at the beginning of the 20th century.

Other authors include: John Boardman, Herbert Read, Hans Richter, Edward Lucie-Smith, Philip Rawson, David Talbot Rice, Peter Murray and Linda Murray, Germain Bazin, and Griselda Pollock.

== History ==
Some earliest hardbacks with glossy dust jackets, spanning the period 1961–1980, the majority of these publications date back to the 1960s.

The series was initially titled The World of Art Library and published with black backgrounds on the back cover and spine, the front usually taken by a large image in colour. The earliest hardbacks were published with visually striking glossy dust jackets.

The series experienced its second revamp in 2001, at the time of the publication of its 300th title. According to a Thames & Hudson spokesman, the redesigned books are glossier to make them appear less 'text book-like'.

In 2020, World of Art was relaunched with a batch of new titles, the covers have been once again redesigned by Dutch design studio Kummer & Herrman, now using white as background. The design was inspired by the golden ratio. In regard to the relaunch, the director of Thames & Hudson Sophy Thompson remarked during an interview with The Bookseller: 'In looking at World of Art, we were looking at the changing art market. For me, it felt that not to rethink our legacy series was a mistake: we had to keep it fresh and updated.' Amongst the new titles it could be highlighted Monet by James H. Rubin, a refreshing reconsideration of the painter, and Central and Eastern European Art since 1950 by Maja and Reuben Fowkes.

The earliest titles were grouped into eight categories with colour codes: Architecture (orange), Artists (pink), Galleries (green), General (yellow), History of Art (blue), Modern Movements (red), Music (white) and New Directions (grey).

In France and Spain, the series was published by Éditions Thames & Hudson and Ediciones Destino, under the titles L'Univers de l'art and El mundo del arte, respectively, which are termed collections instead of book series. The series has been published in North America by Thames & Hudson and sometimes other publishers.

== List of books in the series ==
Title	Author(s)	Year of publication
A Concise History of Art, Part One: From the Beginnings to the Fifteenth Century	Germain Bazin	1958
A Concise History of Art, Part Two: From the Renaissance to the Present Day	Germain Bazin	1958
Encyclopædia of Old Masters	Joachim Fernau	1958
A Concise History of Modern Painting	Herbert Read	1959 (revised 1975)
A Concise History of Modern Sculpture	Herbert Read	1959
The Louvre	Germain Bazin	1959
The Prado	Sanchez Canton	1959
Albrecht Dürer	Marcel Brion	1960
Dutch Museums	R. van Luttervelt	1960
The Arts of Man	Eric Newton	1960
The Artist in his Studio	Alexander Liberman	1960
Renoir	François Fosca	1961
The Hermitage	Pierre Descargues	1961
The Art of the Ancient Near East	Seton Lloyd	1961
The World of the Impressionists	François Mathey	1961
A Concise History of Painting: From Giotto to Cézanne	Michael Levey	1962
The School of Paris	Bernard Dorival	1962
The Dresden Gallery	Henner Menz	1962
Primitive Art	Douglas Fraser	1962
Graphic Art of the 19th Century	Claude Roger-Marx	1962
Surrealism	Patrick Waldberg	1962 (revised 1997)
The Tate Gallery	John Rothenstein	1962
Masters of the Japanese Print	Richard Lane	1962
The Russian Experiment in Art, 1863–1922	Camilla Gray (revised by Marian Burleigh-Motley)	1962 (revised 1986)
A Concise History of Russian Art	Tamara Talbot Rice	1963
Michelangelo	Rolf Schott	1963
The Art of the Renaissance	Peter and Linda Murray	1963
Art of the Byzantine Era	David Talbot Rice	1963
Art of China, Korea, and Japan	Peter Swann	1963
Impressionist Paintings in the Louvre	Germain Bazin	1963
Encyclopaedia of Modern Architecture	Gerd Hatje (editor)	1963
Greek Art	John Boardman	1964 (revised 2016)
Roman Art and Architecture	Mortimer Wheeler	1964
Elements of the Art of Architecture	William Muschenheim	1964
The Arts of Spain	José Gudiol	1964 (revised 1999)
Baroque and Rococo Art (retitled Baroque and Rococo)	Germain Bazin	1964
Graphic Art of the 18th Century	Jean Adhémar	1964
Toulouse-Lautrec	Jean Bouret	1964
The English Garden	Edward Hyams	1964
A Concise History of English Painting	William Gaunt	1964
Early Medieval Art: Carolingian, Ottonian, Romanesque	John Beckwith	1964
Dada: Art and Anti-Art	Hans Richter	1964 (revised 2016)
The National Gallery Washington	John Walker	1964
Ancient Arts of the Americas	G. H. S. Bushnell	1965
Ancient Arts of Central Asia	Tamara Talbot Rice	1965
Islamic Art	David Talbot Rice	1965
European Sculpture: From Romanesque to Rodin	H. D. Molesworth	1965
A Concise History of Ballet	F. Reyna	1965
A Concise History of Photography	Helmut and Alison Gernsheim	1965
Henry Moore	Herbert Read	1965
Klee	Gualtieri di San Lazzaro	1965
Chagall	Jean Cassou	1965
Degas	Jean Bouret	1965
Goya	Jean-François Chabrun	1965
Picasso	Pierre Daix	1965
Seurat	John Russell	1965
Van Gogh	Frank Elgar	1966
The Uffizi and Pitti	Filippo Rossi	1966
Italian Gardens	Georgina Masson	1966
Italian Villas and Palaces	Georgina Masson	1966
Prehistoric Art	T. G. E. Powell	1966
Art of the Romantic Era	Marcel Brion	1966
A Concise History of Interior Decoration	George Savage	1966
Rococo to Revolution: Major Trends in Eighteenth-Century Painting	Michael Levey	1966
Cubism	Edward F. Fry	1966
Matisse	Jean Guichard-Meili	1967 (revised 1979)
Rubens	Pierre Cabanne	1967
Rodin	Bernard Champigneulle (revised by J. Maxwell Brownjohn)	1967 (revised 1980)
Minoan and Mycenaean Art	Reynold Higgins	1967
A Companion to Painting	William Gaunt	1967
A Concise History of Painting: From Prehistory to the 13th Century	David Talbot Rice	1967
The Cathedrals of England	Alec Clifton-Taylor	1967
Gothic Art	Andrew Martindale	1967
The High Renaissance	Linda Murray	1967
The Late Renaissance and Mannerism	Linda Murray	1967
Impressionism	Phoebe Pool	1967
American Art since 1900: A Critical History	Barbara Rose	1967
Arp	Herbert Read	1968
Braque	Edwin Mullins	1968
Mondrian	Frank Elgar	1968
Rembrandt	J. E. Muller	1968
Barbara Hepworth	A. M. Hammacher	1968 (revised 1987)
The National Gallery London	Philip Hendy	1968
A History of Western Art	Michael Levey	1968
A Concise History of Bronzes	George Savage	1968
A Concise History of the Theatre	Phyllis Hartnoll	1968 (revised 2012)
The Sources of Modern Architecture and Design	Nikolaus Pevsner (revised by Kenneth Frampton)	1968 (revised 2024)
Turner	Graham Reynolds (revised by David Blayney Brown)	1969 (revised 2020)
Cézanne	Frank Elgar	1969
Hawksmoor	Kerry Downes	1969
Russell Drysdale	Geoffrey Dutton	1969
William Dobell	James Gleeson	1969
A Concise History of Irish Art	Bruce Arnold	1969 (revised 1977)
A Concise History of Costume (revised and retitled Costume and Fashion: A Concise History)	James Laver	1969
A Concise History of Western Architecture	R. Furneaux Jordan	1969
The Architecture of the Italian Renaissance	Peter Murray	1969
De Stijl	Paul Overy	1969
Movements in Art since 1945	Edward Lucie-Smith	1969 (revised 2020)
Miró	Roland Penrose (revised by Anthony Penrose and Eduardo de Benito)	1970 (revised 2022)
William Blake	Kathleen Raine	1970 (revised 2021)
Surrealist Art	S. Alexandrian	1970
Pop Art	Lucy R. Lippard	1970
The Pre-Raphaelites	Timothy Hilton	1970
A Concise History of Venetian Painting	John Steer	1970 (revised 1980)
The Munich Gallery: Alte Pinakothek	Wolf-Dieter Dube	1970
The Art Institute of Chicago	John Maxon	1970
Wren	Margaret Whinney	1971 (revised 1998)
African Art	Frank Willett	1971
Metaphysical Art	Massimo Carrà (in collaboration with Caroline Tisdall, Ewald Rathke, and Patrick Waldberg)	1971
The Cubists	Paul Waldo Schwartz	1971
The Berlin Gallery	Rüdiger Klessmann	1971
Treasures of the British Museum	Sir Frank Francis (editor)	1971
Treasures of the Vatican	Oreste Ferrari	1971
A History of American Painting	Matthew Baigell	1971
A Concise History of French Painting	Edward Lucie-Smith	1971
A Concise History of Watercolours	Graham Reynolds	1971
Encyclopaedia of Themes and Subjects in Painting	Howard Daniel, introduction by John Berger	1971
The Picture History of Painting (Concise Edition)	H. W. and Dora Jane Janson	1971
The New York School: Abstract Expressionism in the 40s and 50s	Maurice Tuchman	1971
Edvard Munch	J. P. Hodin	1972 (revised 1985)
The Essential Max Ernst	Uwe M. Schneede	1972
Symbolist Art	Edward Lucie-Smith	1972
Eroticism in Western Art	Edward Lucie-Smith	1972
Modern European Art	Alan Bowness	1972
The Expressionists	Wolf-Dieter Dube	1972
A Concise History of Opera	Leslie Orrey	1972
A Concise History of Posters (retitled Posters: a concise history)	John Barnicoat	1972
Art without Boundaries: 1950–70	Gerald Woods, Philip Thompson, John Williams	1972
Science and Technology in Art Today	Jonathan Benthall	1972
The Origins of Christian Art	Michael Gough	1973
Hieronymus Bosch	Walter S. Gibson	1973
The Art of Tantra	Philip Rawson	1973
The National Gallery of Victoria	Ursula Hoff	1973
Futurist Manifestos	Umbro Apollonio (editor)	1973
Beethoven	H. C. Robbins Landon	1974
El Greco	Jacques Lassaigne	1974
Environments and Happenings	Adrian Henri	1974
Athenian Black Figure Vases	John Boardman	1974
Athenian Red Figure Vases: The Archaic Period	John Boardman	1975
Picasso	Timothy Hilton	1975 (revised 1985)
Velázquez	Joseph-Émile Muller	1976
Botticelli	L. D. and Helen S. Ettlinger	1976
David Hockney	Marco Livingstone	1976 (revised 2017)
English Parish Churches	Edwin Smith, Olive Cook, Graham Hutton	1976
A Concise History of Indian Art	Roy C. Craven	1976
Photomontage	Dawn Adès	1976 (revised 2021)
Prints of the Twentieth Century: A History (retitled Prints of the 20th Century: A History)	Riva Castleman	1976
Bruegel	Walter S. Gibson	1977
Futurism	Caroline Tisdall, Angelo Bozzolla	1977 (revised 1985)
The High Renaissance and Mannerism: Italy, the North and Spain, 1500–1600	Linda Murray	1977
Edwardian Architecture: A Handbook to Building Design in Britain 1890–1914	Alastair Service	1977
Greek Sculpture: The Archaic Period	John Boardman	1978 (revised 1985)
Greek Sculpture: The Classical Period	John Boardman	1978
Dutch Painting	R. H. Fuchs	1978
Romanticism and Art (retitled "Romantic Art")	William Vaughan	1978 (revised 1985)
A Concise History of Modern Music: From Debussy to Boulez	Paul Griffiths	1978
Victorian Architecture	Roger Dixon, Stefan Muthesius	1978
English Architecture	David Watkin	1979
Matisse	Lawrence Gowing	1979 (revised 1985)
Francis Bacon	John Russell	1979
Furniture: A Concise History	Edward Lucie-Smith	1979
Michelangelo	Linda Murray	1980
Egyptian Art	Cyril Aldred	1980
Chinese Art	Mary Tregear	1980 (revised 1997)
Native Arts of North America	Christian F. Feest	1980
The Classical Language of Architecture	John Summerson (revised by Alan Powers)	1980 (revised 2023)
Modern Architecture: A Critical History	Kenneth Frampton	1980 (revised 2020)
Industrial Design	John Heskett	1980
Hogarth	David Bindman	1981 (revised 2022)
Egon Schiele	Frank Whitford	1981
Photography: A Concise History	Ian Jeffrey	1981
A Concise Encyclopaedia of the Italian Renaissance	J. R. Hale	1981
Dalí	Dawn Adès	1982 (revised 2022)
Dictionary of the Italian Renaissance	J. R. Hale	1983
Bauhaus	Frank Whitford (revised by Michael White)	1984 (revised 2020)
Japanese Art	Joan Stanley-Baker	1984 (revised 2014)
Dictionary of Art Terms	Edward Lucie-Smith	1984 (revised 2003)
Dictionary of Art and Artists	Herbert Read	1985 (revised 1994)
Encyclopaedia of British Art	David Bindman (general editor)	1985
American Architecture	David P. Handlin	1985 (revised 2004)
Magritte	Suzi Gablik	1985
Modigliani	Carol Mann	1985
British Art since 1900	Frances Spalding	1986
The Art of Mesoamerica: From Olmec to Aztec	Mary Ellen Miller	1986 (revised 2019)
Encyclopaedia of 20th-Century Music (retitled Dictionary of 20th-Century Music)	Paul Griffiths	1986
Classical Music: A Concise History from Gluck to Beethoven	Julian Rushton	1986
Romantic Music: A Concise History from Schubert to Sibelius	Arnold Whittall	1987
The Impressionists at First Hand	Bernard Denvir (editor)	1987
Constable	Michael Rosenthal	1987
Gauguin	Belinda Thomson	1987 (revised 2020)
Rembrandt	Christopher White	1988 (revised 2022)
Dictionary of British Art	Nigel Morgan, David Bindman (editor)	1988
Impressionism: Origins, Practice, Reception	Belinda Thomson	1988 (revised 2000)
Art Deco	Alastair Duncan	1988
Ballet & Modern Dance	Susan Au	1988 (revised 2012)
Performance Art: From Futurism to the Present	Roselee Goldberg	1988 (revised 2025)
Red Figure Vases of South Italy and Sicily	A. D. Trendall	1989
Van Gogh	Melissa McQuillan	1989
Klimt	Frank Whitford	1990
Encyclopaedia of Impressionism	Bernard Denvir	1990
Abstract Art	Anna Moszynska	1990 (revised 2020)
Abstract Expressionism	David Anfam	1990 (revised 2015)
Women, Art, and Society	Whitney Chadwick	1990 (revised 2020)
Fauvism	Sarah Whitfield	1991
Palladio and Palladianism	Robert Tavernor	1991
Art and Myth in Ancient Greece	T. H. Carpenter	1991 (revised 2021)
Hellenistic Sculpture	R. R. R. Smith	1991
The Arts and Crafts Movement	Elizabeth Cumming, Wendy Kaplan	1991
Sexuality in Western Art	Edward Lucie-Smith	1991
Toulouse-Lautrec	Bernard Denvir	1991
Art of the Celts	Lloyd and Jennifer Laing	1992
Italian Renaissance Sculpture	Roberta J. M. Olson	1992
Post-Impressionism	Bernard Denvir	1992
Dictionary of Graphic Design and Designers	Alan and Isabella Livingston	1992 (revised 2012)
Aboriginal Art	Wally Caruana	1993 (to be revised 2025)
Victorian Painting	Julian Treuherz	1993
Buddhist Art and Architecture	Robert E. Fisher	1993
Design since 1945	Peter Dormer	1993
Latin American Art of the 20th Century (revised and retitled Latin American Art since 1900)	Edward Lucie-Smith	1993 (revised 2020)
Art Nouveau	Alastair Duncan	1994
Concepts of Modern Art: From Fauvism to Postmodernism	Nikos Stangos	1994
Graphic Design: A Concise History	Richard Hollis	1994
Primitivism and Modern Art	Colin Rhodes	1994
Greek Sculpture: The Late Classical Period	John Boardman	1995
Oceanic Art	Nicholas Thomas	1995 (revised 2018)
Charles Rennie Mackintosh	Alan Crawford	1995
Manet	Alan Krell	1996
Jewelry: From Antiquity to the Present	Clare Phillips	1996
History of Film	David Parkinson	1996 (revised 2012)
Art of the Andes: From Chavín to Inca	Rebecca Stone-Miller	1996 (revised 2012)
Architecture after Modernism	Diane Ghirardo	1996
Etruscan Art	Nigel Spivey	1997
Art of Tibet	Robert E. Fisher	1997
Art since 1960	Michael Archer	1997 (revised 2015)
Black Art and Culture in the 20th Century	Richard J. Powell	1997 (revised 2021)
Art in Australia: From Colonization to Postmodernism	Christopher Allen	1997
Jazz	Mervyn Cooke	1998
Bonnard	Timothy Hyman	1998
Caribbean Art	Veerle Poupeye	1998 (revised 2022)
Dictionary of Fashion and Fashion Designers	Georgina O'Hara Callan	1998 (revised 2008)
Italian Baroque Sculpture	Bruce Boucher	1998
Early Greek Vase Painting	John Boardman	1998
Mary Cassatt: Painter of Modern Women	Griselda Pollock	1998 (revised 2022)
Western Architecture	Ian Sutton	1999
The Arts in Spain	John F. Moffitt	1999
Maya Art and Architecture	Mary Ellen Miller, Megan E. O'Neil	1999 (revised 2014)
Islamic Art and Architecture	Robert Hillenbrand	1999 (revised 2021)
British Painting: The Golden Age	William Vaughan	1999
Marcel Duchamp	Dawn Adès, Neil Cox, David Hopkins	1999 (revised 2021)
Contemporary African Art	Sidney Littlefield Kasfir	1999 (revised 2020)
New Media in Late 20th-Century Art	Michael Rush	1999
Realism in 20th Century Painting	Brendan Prendeville	2000
Outsider Art: Spontaneous Alternatives	Colin Rhodes	2000 (revised 2022)
Scottish Art	Murdo Macdonald	2000 (revised 2021)
Hindu Art and Architecture	George Michell	2000
Le Corbusier	Kenneth Frampton	2001 (revised 2024)
Georgia O'Keeffe	Lisa Mintz Messinger	2001 (revised 2022)
The Language of Ornament	James Trilling	2001
Cubism and Culture	Mark Antliff, Patricia Leighten	2001
Art of the Middle Ages	Janetta Rebold Benton	2002
The Gothic Revival	Michael J. Lewis	2002
Gainsborough	William Vaughan	2002
Five Centuries of British Painting: From Holbein to Hodgkin	Andrew Wilton	2002
Italian Architecture from Michelangelo to Borromini	Andrew Hopkins	2002
Black Art: A Cultural History	Richard J. Powell	2002 (revised 2022)
Sienese Painting	Timothy Hyman	2003 (revised 2023)
French Painting in the Golden Age	Christopher Allen	2003
20th Century Ceramics	Edmund de Waal	2003
World Textiles: A Concise History	Mary Schoeser	2003 (revised 2022)
American Art since 1945	David Joselit	2003
Los Angeles County Museum of Art	–	2003
Digital Art	Christiane Paul	2003 (revised 2023)
Internet Art	Rachel Greene	2004
Scottish Architecture	Miles Glendinning, Aonghus MacKechnie	2004
North American Indian Art	David W. Penney	2004
The Photograph as Contemporary Art	Charlotte Cotton	2004 (revised 2020)
Art & Architecture of Cambodia	Helen Ibbitson Jessup	2004
Arts of Southeast Asia	Fiona Kerlogue	2004
Dictionary of Ancient Egypt	Toby Wilkinson	2005
Dictionary of Design since 1900	Guy Julier	2005
American Art and Architecture	Michael J. Lewis	2006
Colour in Art	John Gage	2006 (revised 2023)
Interior Design since 1900	Anne Massey	2008 (revised 2020)
The Body in Contemporary Art	Sally O'Reilly	2009 (revised 2025)
Fashion since 1900	Valerie Mendes, Amy de la Haye	2010 (revised 2021)
Ideals of Beauty: Asian and American Art in the Freer and Sackler Galleries	Julian Raby	2010
Graffiti and Street Art	Anna Wacławek	2011
Sculpture Now	Anna Moszynska	2013
Art and Architecture in Mexico	James Oles	2013
Viking Art	James Graham-Campbell	2013 (revised 2021)
Body Art	Nicholas Thomas	2014
Art since 1989	Kelly Grovier	2015
Cave Art	Bruno David	2017
Egyptian Art	Bill Manley	2017
Costume and Fashion	James Laver, Amy de La Haye, and Andrew Tucker	2020
Monet	James H. Rubin	2020
Central and Eastern European Art since 1950	Maja and Reuben Fowkes	2020
Contemporary Painting	Suzanne Hudson	2021
The Art of Contemporary China	Jiang Jiehong	2021
Art in California	Jenni Sorkin	2021
Artists' Film	David Curtis, foreword by Steve McQueen	2021
Graphic Design in the Twentieth Century	Richard Hollis	2021
Art and Climate Change	Maja and Reuben Fowkes	2022
Cézanne	Richard Verdi	2022
Raphael	Paul Joannides	2022
Women in Design	Anne Massey	2022
Modern Painting	Simon Morley	2023
Velázquez	Richard Verdi	2023
The Art of Ukraine	Alisa Lozhkina	2024
The World of Late Antiquity	Peter Brown	2024 (originally published stand alone in 1971)
Expressionism	Colin Rhodes	2025
Illustration: A Concise History	Andrew Hall	2025
New Deal Art	John P. Murphy	2025
Dutch Painting	Gary Schwartz	2026
Art of the Ancient Americas	James A. Doyle	2026

== See also ==
- Livre d'art
- List of publishers
- Thames & Hudson's 'New Horizons' series
- Oxford History of Art
- Pelican History of Art
