= Christiane Paul (curator) =

American art historian

Christiane Paul is Curator of Digital Art at the Whitney Museum of American Art and professor emerita in the School of Media Studies at The New School. She is the author of the book Digital Art, which is part of the 'World of Art' series published by Thames & Hudson.

== Education ==
Paul received both her MA and PhD from the University of Düsseldorf in North Rhine-Westphalia, Germany.

== Career ==
In 2016, Paul was the recipient of the Thoma Foundation Arts Writing Award in Digital Art for an established arts writer who has made significant contributions to the intersection of art and technology.

In 2018, Paul was a speaker at the Chicago New Media Symposium which was held as part of the Chicago New Media 1973–1992 Exhibition. The Exhibition was curated by jonCates. and her books are Digital Art (Thames and Hudson, 2003, 2008, 2015, 2023); A Companion to Digital Art (Blackwell-Wiley, May 2016); Context Providers – Conditions of Meaning in Media Arts (Intellect, 2011; Chinese edition, 2012); and New Media in the White Cube and Beyond (UC Press, 2008).

At the Whitney Museum she curated exhibitions including Refigured (2023), Programmed: Rules, Codes, and Choreographies in Art 1965 - 2018 (2018/19), Cory Arcangel: Pro Tools (2011) and Profiling (2007), and is responsible for artport, the museum's portal to Internet art. Other curatorial work includes Chain Reaction (feralfile.com, 2023), DiMoDA 4.0 Dis/Location (traveling show, 2021- ), The Question of Intelligence (Kellen Gallery, The New School, NYC, 2020), and What Lies Beneath (Borusan Contemporary, Istanbul, 2015).

Paul has taught in the MFA computer arts department at the School of Visual Arts in New York (1999-2008); the Digital+Media Department of the Rhode Island School of Design (2005–08); the San Francisco Art Institute and the Center of New Media at the University of California at Berkeley (2008).

2003 cover of the Christiane Paul art history book Digital Art

== Publications ==
- Digital Art, World of Art series, Thames & Hudson, UK, (1st edition 2003; 2nd revised edition 2008, 3rd revised edition 2015, 4th revised edition 2023)
- A Companion to Digital Art, Wiley-Blackwell, April 2016, Hoboken, NJ
- Die Antizipation der amerikanischen Postmoderne im Romanwerk Herman Melvilles / The Anticipation of Postmodern American Fiction in the Novels of Herman Melville [Dissertation], Idstein, Germany: Schulz-Kirchner Verlag, 1988
- Unreal City, A Hypertext Companion to T.S. Eliot's The Waste Land, Storyspace hypertext software, Cambridge, MA: Eastgate Systems, Inc., 1995
- telematic landscape / Telematische Landschaft, editor, Verlag Walther König, Cologne, Germany, 1999
- New Media in the White Cube and Beyond – Curatorial Models for Digital Art, editor, UC California Press, 2008
- Context Providers — Conditions of Meaning in Media Arts, co-editor with Margot Lovejoy and Victoria Vesna, Intellect Press, UK / University of Chicago Press, 2011
- Chinese Edition: Context Providers — Conditions of Meaning in Media Arts (Beijing Beepub Media & Culture Publishing Co., Ltd: Beijing, 2012)

== Awards, fellowships and residencies ==
- 2005–2007: Cassullo Fellow, Independent Study Program, Whitney Museum
- 2013: Dora Maar Fellow in Residence, Dora Maar House, Menerbes, France
- 2014: Residency at the David Bermant Foundation, Santa Ynez, CA
- 2016: Recipient of the Thoma Foundation's 2016 Arts Writing Award in Digital Art (Established Category)

== Exhibitions curated ==
2001

- Net Art Selection for EVO1, Gallery L, Moscow, Russia (10/04 – 10/25)
- Data Dynamics — Exhibition of Net Art, Whitney Museum (03/22 – 06/10)

2002

- CODeDOC – online exhibition at the Whitney's artport site (09/16 – present)
- Mapping Transitions – a net art exhibition and forum at the University of Colorado, Boulder; Co-curator and organizer, with Mark Amerika (09/13 – 09/15)
- 2002 Whitney Biennial, Net Art Selection (03/07 – 05/26)
- Re-Media — Net Art Selection for the 2002 Fotofest Biennial (03/01 – 04/01)

2003

- CODeDOC II – the Ars Electronica Festival in Linz, Austria (09/06 – 09/11)
- Vectors: Digital Art of Our Time – 10th anniversary exhibition of the New York Digital Salon, World Financial Center, NYC; Co-curator (04/22 – 05/25)

2004

- The Passage of Mirage – Chelsea Art Museum; public program of Intelligent Agent; Co-curator (09/14 – 10/16)
- Evident Traces – Ciberarts Festival, Bilbao, Spain (04/23 – 04/30)
- eVolution – Art Interactive Gallery, Boston (01/23 – 04/11)

2005-06

- Follow Through – A Mobile Media Project, Whitney Museum of American Art (12/01 – 01/29)

2006

- Translations: Misguided Machines and Cultural Loops – Selected Works by Students of the Design+Media Dept., RISD, Emergence at DUO Theater, NYC (11/04 – 11/26)
- Second Natures – Eli & Edythe Broad Art Center, UCLA, Los Angeles, CA (09/13 – 10/26)
- ARCO Blackbox – ARCO ART Fair, Madrid, Spain; Co-curator (02/08 – 02/12)

2007

- Profiling – Whitney Museum of American Art (06/08 – 09/09)
- Feedback – Laboral Center for Art and Industrial Creation, Gijon, Spain; Co-curator (03/30 – 06/30)

2008

- SOS 4.8 Festival – Murcia, Spain; Co-curator (05/02 – 05/04)

2009

- Artistic Director, 3rd Biennale Quadrilaterale in Rijeka, Croatia (12/08 – 01/16/10)
- FEEDFORWARD – The Angel of History, Laboral Art Center, Gijon, Spain; co-curated with Steve Dietz (10/22 – 04/05)
- Incheon Digital Art Festival (INDAF), Incheon, Korea; co-curated with Hye Kyung Shin and Gerfried Stocker (08/07 – 10/25)

2013

- The Public Private, Sheila Johnson Design Center, Kellen Gallery, The New School (02/06 – 04/17)
- v\America's Got No Talent, Jonah Brucker Cohen and Katherine Moriwaki, artport, Whitney Museum of American Art (02/13 – present)
- Light and Dark Networks, Ursula Endlicher, Sunset / Sunrise series, artport, Whitney Museum of American Art (12/15 – present)
- The Assignment Book: a project by Luis Camnitzer, co-curated with Trebor Scholz, Arnold and Sheila Aronson Galleries, The New School (09/21 – 10/16)
- Cory Arcangel: Pro Tools, Whitney Museum of American Art (05/26 – 09/11)
- CLICKISTANv by Ubermorgen.com – online game, Whitney Museum of American Art (12/12 – present)
- Eduardo Kac: Lagoglyphs, Biotopes and Transgenic Works, Oi Futuro, Rio de Janeiro, Brazil (01/25 – 03/30)

2018

- Programmed: Rules, Codes, and Choreographies in Art, 1965–2018, The Whitney Museum of American Art (09/28/18 – 04/14/19)

2024

- Harold Cohen: AARON, The Whitney Museum of American Art (02/03/24 – 06/30/24)

== Addition sources ==
- Bruce Wands, Art of the Digital Age, London: Thames & Hudson, 2006
- Ian Chilvers & John Glaves-Smith, A Dictionary of Modern and Contemporary Art. Oxford University Press, 2009
- Lieser Wolf. Digital Art. Langenscheidt: h.f. ullmann, 2009
- Sarah Cook, Verina Gfader, Beryl Graham and Axel Lapp (eds), A Brief History of Curating New Media Art, Berlin: The Green Box, 2010
