= Henry-Alex Rubin =

American film director (born 1973)

- Born: September 3, 1973 (age 53); Boston, Massachusetts, U.S.
- Education: Columbia University
- Occupations: Film director, screenwriter
- Years active: 1996-present
- Notable work: Murderball
- Parent: James H. Rubin

Henry-Alex Rubin (born 1973) is an Academy Award-nominated American filmmaker and Emmy Award-winning commercial director.

== Early life and education ==
Henry-Alex Rubin grew up in New York City as the son of a French mother and noted art historian James H. Rubin. After grade school in the city, he attended Phillips Academy in Andover for high school, and earned a double major degree in political science and film studies from Columbia University in 1995.

== Career ==
=== Feature films ===
Rubin won initial acclaim with his first feature, a documentary film titled Who is Henry Jaglom? featuring Candice Bergen and Dennis Hopper and released by PBS and First Run Features. The film won the Jury Prize for Best Documentary at the Slamdance Film Festival, the Audience Award for Best Documentary at the New York Avignon Film Festival, and was a finalist at the Dallas Film Festival.

Rubin, who was mentored by James Mangold while at Columbia University, was hired by Mangold to direct the second unit on several films including Cop Land and Girl, Interrupted.

In 2000, Rubin returned to documentaries and produced Freestyle, which won Best Documentary at the Woodstock, LAIFF and Urbanworld Film Festivals. This was followed by him co-directing Murderball with Dana Adam Shapiro. Murderball won the Audience Award at the Sundance Film Festival and was nominated for a Best Documentary Academy Award in 2005.

Rubin directed the 2012 feature film Disconnect, which premiered at the Toronto International Film Festival and the Venice International Film Festival in 2012.

Rubin's feature, Semper Fi, starring Jai Courtney, Nat Wolff, Leighton Meister, and Finn Wittrock was released in 2019.

=== Commercial work ===
Since 2004, Rubin has been directing commercials for commercial production company SMUGGLER. This includes award-winning campaigns for brands such as Adidas, Gatorade, Volvo, Samsung, AT&T and Coca-Cola. Rubin directed several landmark campaigns including "Whopper Freakout" for Burger King and "Pizza Turnaround" for Domino's and was named one of the top 5 most award-winning commercial directors in the world with over 60 Cannes Lions and 5 Clio Awards over his career.

In 2020, Rubin won an Emmy Award for Outstanding Commercial for his work on Back-To-School Essentials, representing gun safety advocacy group Sandy Hook Promise. The spot, which debuted during the “Today” show, starts as a seemingly cheerful back-to-school commercial but then darkens with sounds of screams and gunshots. It was described as “harrowing” by the New York Times.

In 2022, Rubin was nominated by the Directors Guild of America for Outstanding Directorial Achievement in Commercials for Sandy Hook Promise's "Teenage Dream".

== Filmography ==
- Who Is Henry Jaglom? (1997)
- Murderball (2005)
- Disconnect (2012)
- Semper Fi (2019)

== Awards ==
- 2015 Clio Grand Award for Burger King
- 2017 Clio Award for Sandy Hook Promise
- 2020 Primetime Emmy Award for Outstanding Commercial for Sandy Hook Promise
- 2020 Association of Independent Commercial Producers Top PSA for Sandy Hook Promise
