= Slade Professor of Fine Art =

Professorship

The Slade Professorship of Fine Art is the oldest professorship of art and art history at the universities of Cambridge, Oxford and University College London.

== History ==
The chairs were founded concurrently in 1869 by a bequest from the art collector and philanthropist Felix Slade, with studentships also created at University College London. The studentships allowed for the creation of the Slade School of Art, now part of University College London, whose Director holds the Slade Professorship. They are normally, therefore, a practising artist.

The chair at Oxford is a visiting professorship, with duties restricted to a series of eight public lectures per year, on the "History, Theory, and Practice of the Fine Arts", to which four seminars have been added from 2011. The professorship is associated with All Souls College, Oxford. The bequest was also indirectly responsible for the foundation of the Ruskin School of Drawing in Oxford, which was financed by the first Oxford professor, John Ruskin, who announced his intention in his inaugural lecture "to the general dismay of his listeners".

The Cambridge Lectures are also a series of eight public lectures by a visiting professor. The Oxford and Cambridge professors are most often art historians or critics, but some artists have held the posts, especially at Oxford. The lectures are often subsequently published in book version.

== Slade Professors, University College London ==
- Edward John Poynter (1871)
- Alphonse Legros (1876)
- Fred Brown (1882)
- Henry Tonks (1918)
- Randolph Schwabe (1930)
- William Coldstream (1949)
- Lawrence Gowing (1975)
- Patrick George (1985)
- Bernard Cohen (1988)
- John Aiken (2000–2012)
- Susan Alexis Collins (2013–2018)
- Kieren Reed (2018–2023)

== Slade Professors, University of Cambridge ==
- Matthew Digby Wyatt (1869)
- Sidney Colvin (1873)
- John Henry Middleton (1886)
- Charles Waldstein (1895)
- William Martin Conway (1901)
- Charles Waldstein (1904)
- Edward Schroeder Prior (1912)
- Roger Fry (1933)
- William George Constable (1935)
- Geoffrey Fairbank Webb (1938–1941, 1946–1949)
- Nikolaus Pevsner (1949)
- Alan Clutton-Brock (1955)
- Jean Bony (1958)
- Ernst Gombrich (1961)
- Michael Vincent Levey (1963)
- John Pope-Hennessy (1964)
- Anthony Blunt (1965)
- John Summerson (1966)
- Anita Brookner (1967)
- Otto Demus (1968)
- James Sloss Ackerman (1969)
- Rudolf Wittkower (1970)
- George Heard Hamilton (1971)
- Carl Nordenfalk (1972)
- Tilmann Buddensieg (1973)
- Ernst Kitzinger (1974)
- William Watson (1975)
- Harold John Golding (1976)
- Howard Burns (1977)
- Rupert Bruce-Mitford (1978)
- Joseph Rykwert (1979)
- Jennifer Montagu (1980)
- Gerhard Schmidt (1981)
- Theodore Franklin Reff (1982)
- Donovan Michael Sullivan (1983)
- Jan Bialostocki (1984)
- David Mackenzie Wilson (1985)
- Pierre Rosenberg (1986)
- Martin Kemp (1987)
- Lindsay Errington (1988)
- Richard Cork (1989)
- William Henry Toulmin Vaughan (1990)
- Lothar Ledderose (1992)
- Marjorie Elizabeth Cropper (1992)
- Neil Levine (1994)
- Irene Winter (1996)
- Thomas Alexander Heslop (1997)
- Virginia Margaret Spate (1998)
- Albert Blankert (1999)
- Patricia Fortini Brown (2000)
- Joseph Leo Koerner (2002)
- William J. R. Curtis (2003)
- Jerome Feldman (2004)
- Ian Christie (2005)
- Robert Harrist (2006)
- Griselda Pollock (2007)
- Robert Hillenbrand (2008)
- Tim Barringer (2009)
- Barry Bergdoll (2010)
- Paul Crossley (2011)
- Gülru Necipoğlu (2012–2013)
- Jessica Rawson (2013–2014)
- Mary Miller (2014–2015)
- John Ellis Bowlt (2015–2016)
- David Freedberg (2016–2017)
- Stephen Bann (2017–2018)
- Jennifer L. Roberts (2018–2019)
- Nicholas Penny (2019–2020)
- Philippe Descola (2020–2021)
- Maria Balshaw (2021–2022)
- Kavita Singh (2022–2023)
- Pascal Griener (2023–2024)
- Terry Smith (2025–2026)

== Slade Professors, University of Oxford ==
- John Ruskin (1869–1878)
- William Blake Richmond (1879–1883)
- John Ruskin (1883–1885)
- Hubert Herkomer (1885–1895)
- Harry Ellis Wooldridge (1895–1904)
- Charles Holmes (1904–1910)
- Selwyn Image (1910, 1913, 1914) (then suspended 1916–1921)
- Arthur Mayger Hind (1921, 1923)
- Reginald Gleadowe (1928–1933)
- Harry Stuart Goodhart-Rendel (1933–1936)
- Philip Anstiss Hendy (1936–1946)
- Sir Kenneth Clark (1946–1948)
- Ellis Waterhouse (1955)
- John Pope-Hennessy (1956)
- Douglas Cooper (1957)
- Sir John Summerson (1958)
- Eric Newton (1959)
- George Zarnecki (1960)
- Sir Kenneth Clark (again, 1961)
- Sir Anthony Blunt (1962)
- T. S. R. Boase (1963)
- Quentin Bell (1964)
- Sir Leslie Martin (1965)
- David Piper (1966)
- Meyer Schapiro (1967)
- Nikolaus Pevsner (1968)
- F. J. B. Watson (1969)
- Otto Kurz (1970)
- Robert Rosenblum (1971)
- Seymour Slive (1972)
- Michael Sullivan (1973)
- Michael Baxandall (1974)
- Mark Girouard (1975)
- Howard Hibbard (1976)
- Robert Herbert (1977)
- John Beckwith (1978)
- J. Mordaunt Crook (1979)
- Nicholas Penny (1980)
- Jonathan Brown (1981)
- J. F. Harris (1982)
- David Freedberg (1983)
- Irving Lavin (1984)
- Charles Hope (1985)
- John House (1986)
- Henry Mayr-Harting (1987)
- Alistair Rowan (1988–1989)
- Elizabeth McGrath (1989–1990)
- Jennifer Fletcher (1990–1991)
- Michael Rodgers (1991–1992)
- Kirk Varnedoe (1992–1993)
- Juliet Wilson-Bareau (1993–1994)
- Sir Michael Levey (1994–1995)
- John Richardson (1995–1996)
- David Bomford (1996–1997)
- Kathleen Weil-Garris Brandt (1997–1998)
- Joseph Connors (1998–1999)
- Robert Hewison (1999–2000)
- Donald Preziosi (2000–2001)
- Charles Saumarez Smith (2001–2002)
- Ernst van de Wetering (2002–2003)
- Craig Clunas (2003–2004)
- Larry Schaaf (2004–2005)
- Tom Phillips (2005–2006)
- Paul Binski (2006–2007)
- Alex Potts (2007–2008)
- Richard Thomson (2008–2009)
- Dawn Adès (2009–2010)
- Zainab Bahrani (2010–2011)
- Anthony Cutler (2011–2012)
- Joseph Koerner (2012–2013)
- Tamar Garb (2013–2014)
- Antony Griffiths (2014–2015)
- Wu Hung (2015–2016)
- Caroline van Eck (2016–2017)
- David Ekserdjian (2017–2018)
- Finbarr Barry Flood (2018–2019)
- Karen Lang (2019–2020)
- Jerrilynn D. Dodds (2020–2021)
- Chika Okeke-Agulu (2022–2023)
- William Kentridge (2023–2024)
- Beate Fricke (2024–2025)
