= Rocca Maggiore =

Castle in Assisi, Italy

Coordinates: 43.0730°N 12.6151°E

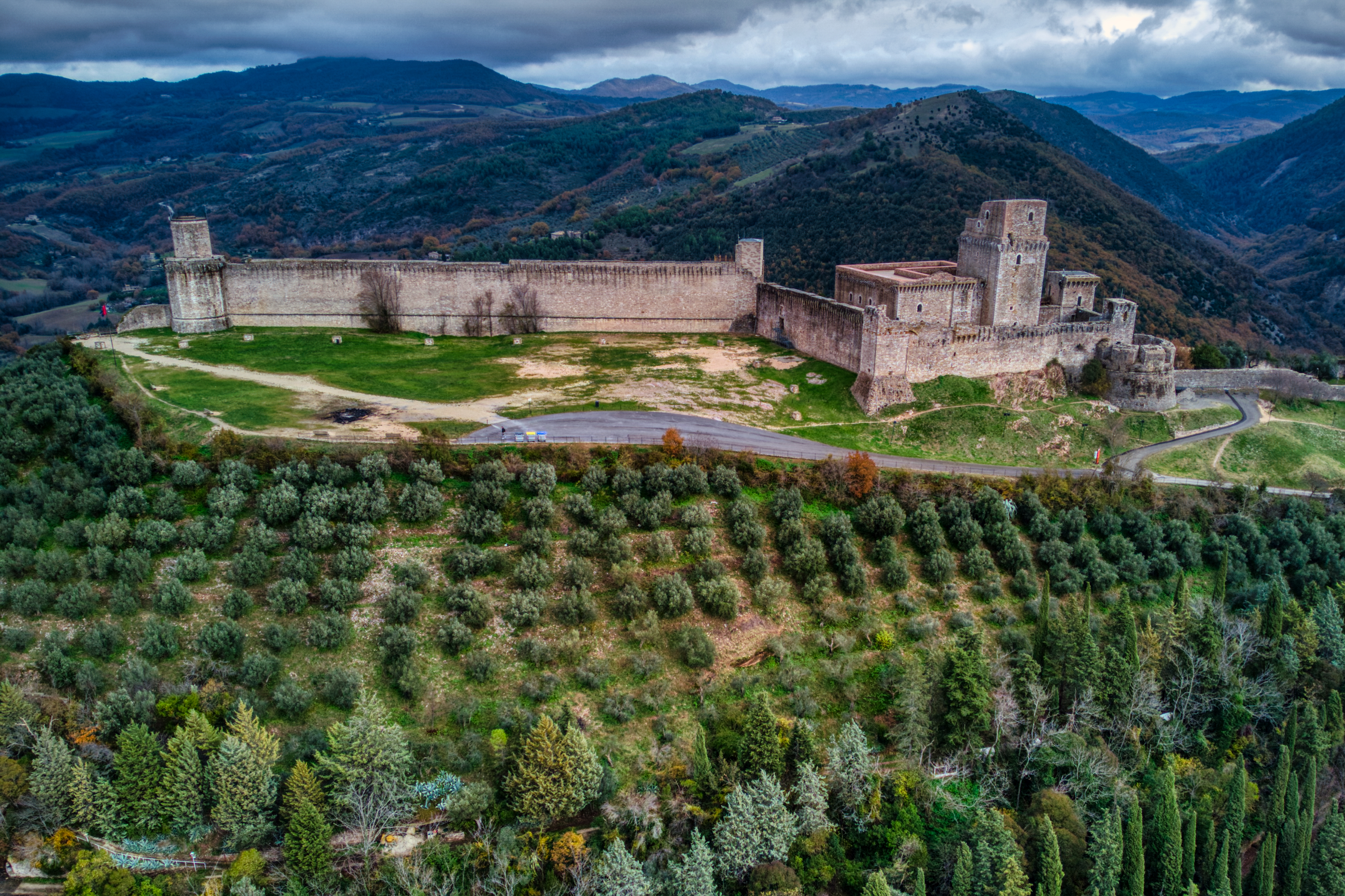
The fortress

The Rocca Maggiore is a castle that served as the principal defensive fortification of the city of Assisi and the Tescio valley, dominating the area for more than eight hundred years.

== Description and history ==
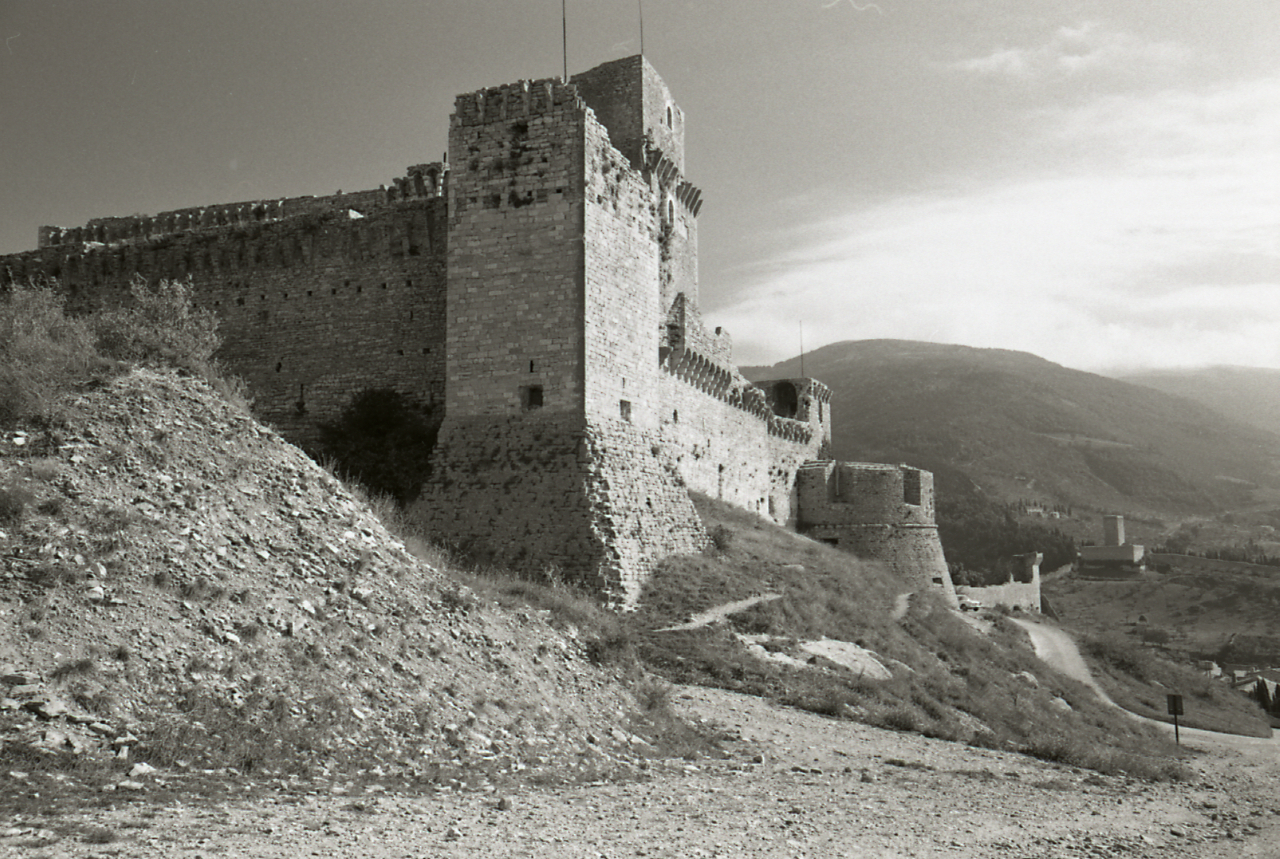
Photo by Paolo Monti, 1967

The current structure of Rocca Maggiore was built in 1316 and consists of two fortresses: the Major and the Minor.

The first documented reference to the fortress dates back to 1173, when the German diplomat and Catholic archbishop Christian of Mainz (1130–1183), chancellor of Germany under Emperor Frederick I Barbarossa, occupied Assisi on behalf of the emperor, who stayed there for a short period.

The young future King of Sicily and Holy Roman Emperor, Frederick II, also resided in the fortress. He had been entrusted by his mother, Costanza d'Altavilla, to the Duchess of Urslingen, the wife of Corrado, Duke of Spoleto and comes Assisi, a close confidant of the Swabian monarch.

Empress Constance later returned to Sicily, but came back to Assisi accompanied by her husband, Henry VI of Swabia. Their son was baptized at the Cathedral of San Rufino and was given the auspicious name Frederick Roger, in honor of his two grandfathers.

In 1198, the city came under the control of the Guelphs loyal to Pope Innocent III. The local population, in opposition to imperial rule, expelled the imperial legate and the young Frederick — who was only four years old — and inflicted extensive damage on the fortress. That same year, Francis of Assisi was sixteen years old.

The fortress was reconstructed in 1356 on the initiative of Cardinal Gil Álvarez Carrillo de Albornoz (1310–1367), who had been commissioned by Pope Innocent VI during the Avignon Papacy to strengthen the fortifications of the Papal States.

In 1458, the captain of Perugia and Lord of Assisi, Jacopo Piccinino (1423–1465), built the polygonal northwestern tower, which was later completed by Pope Pius II. It was connected to the rest of the fortress by a fortified, defensible corridor.

The complex consists of fortress walls built with the pink limestone of Mount Subasio. The walls are trapezoidal in shape, with towers at each corner. Among these is a square formwork structure, renovated in 1478 by Pope Sixtus V, on which the keep now stands.

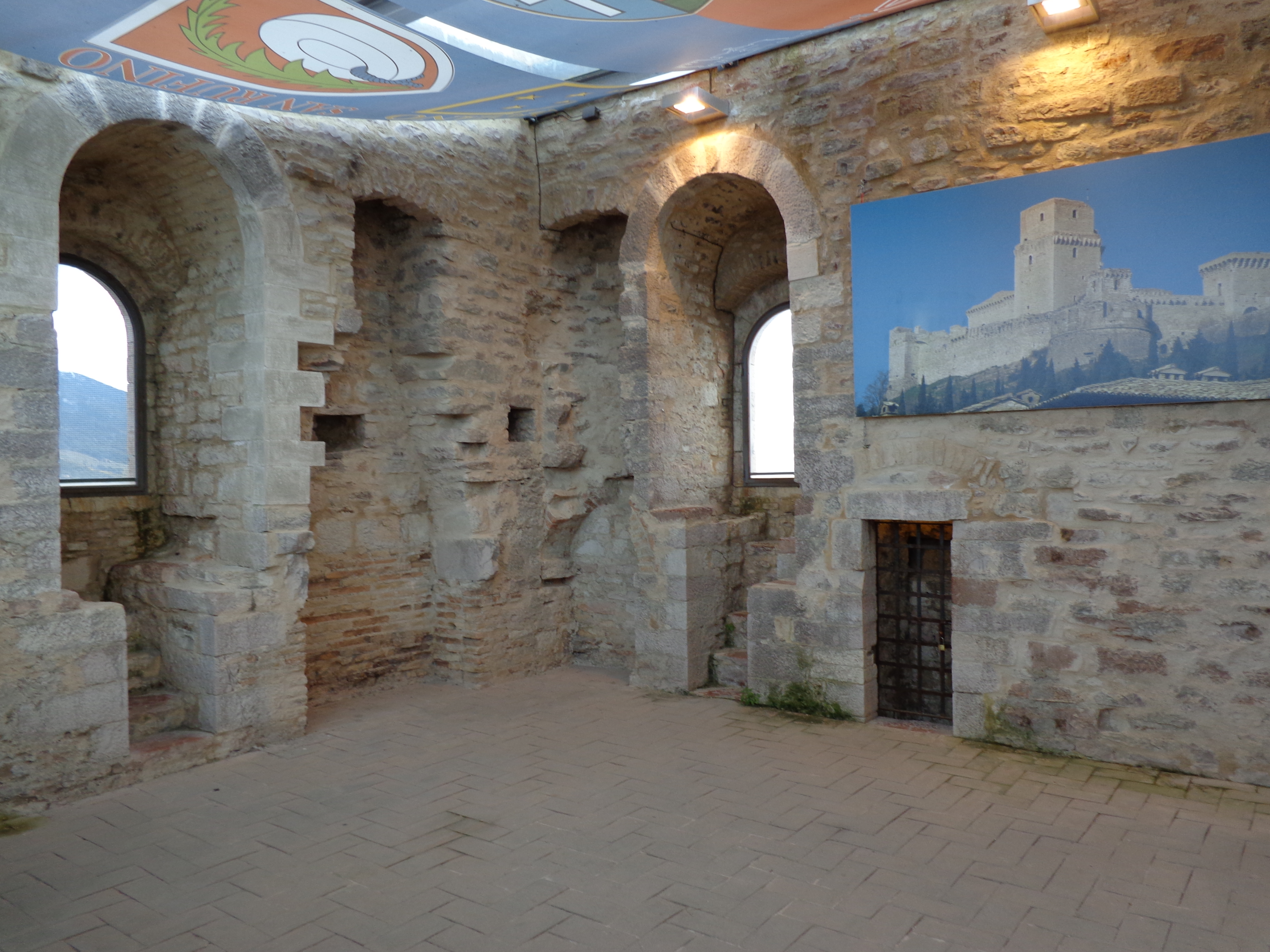
The interior

The interior of the fortress—where, in 1972, several scenes from the film Brother Sun, Sister Moon, directed by Franco Zeffirelli, were shot—leads to the entrance of the round bastion, which was commissioned in 1535 by Pope Paul III.

A large enclosed courtyard contains former service rooms, as well as the mole, the original core of / the castle, which is divided into four rooms accessible via a spiral staircase.

The Rocca Maggiore is connected to its fortress Minor—also known as the stronghold or Keep of St. Anthony—via the fourteenth-century walls. This smaller stronghold was commissioned by Cardinal Albornoz to reinforce the fortifications on the mountainside.

== Gallery ==
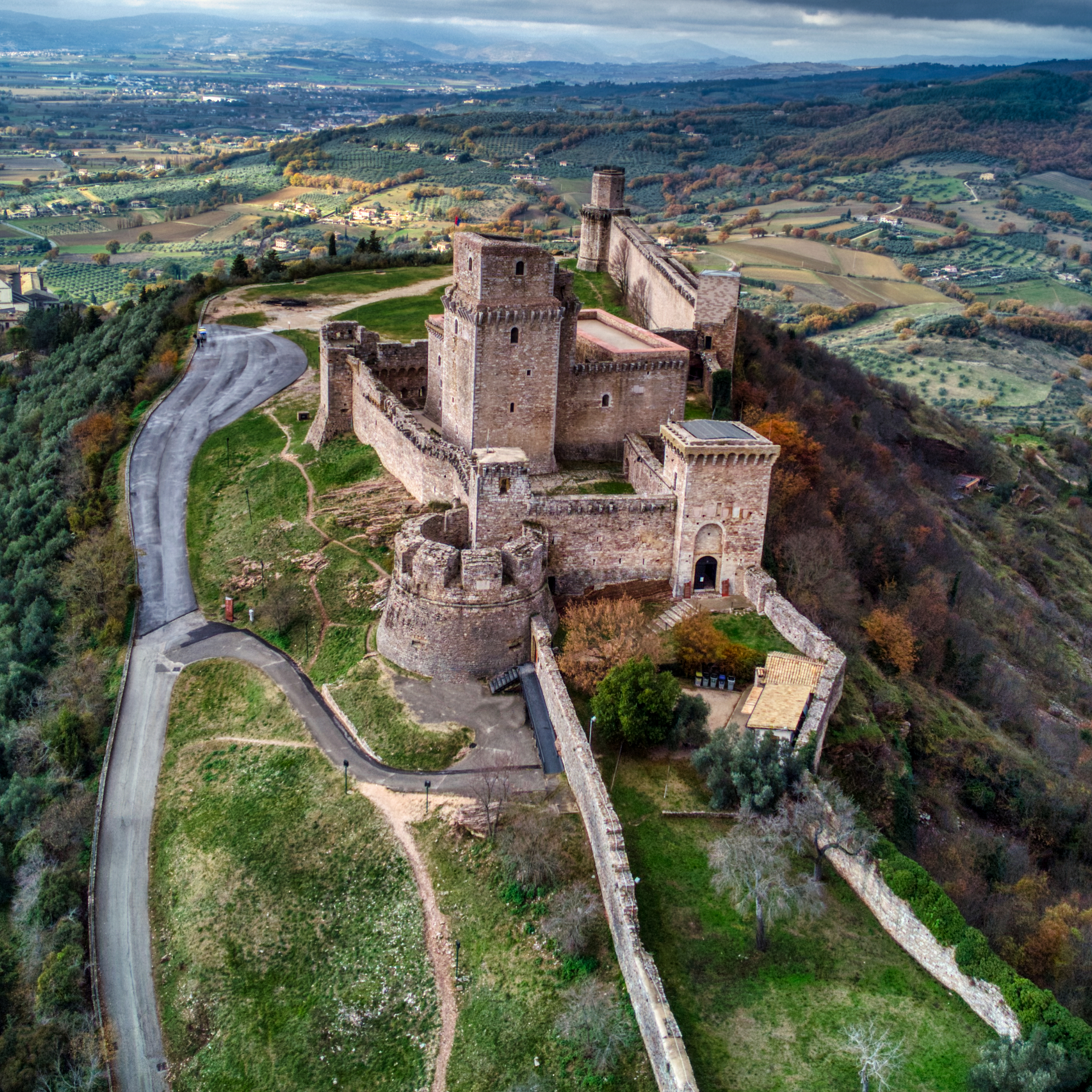
View of the fortress

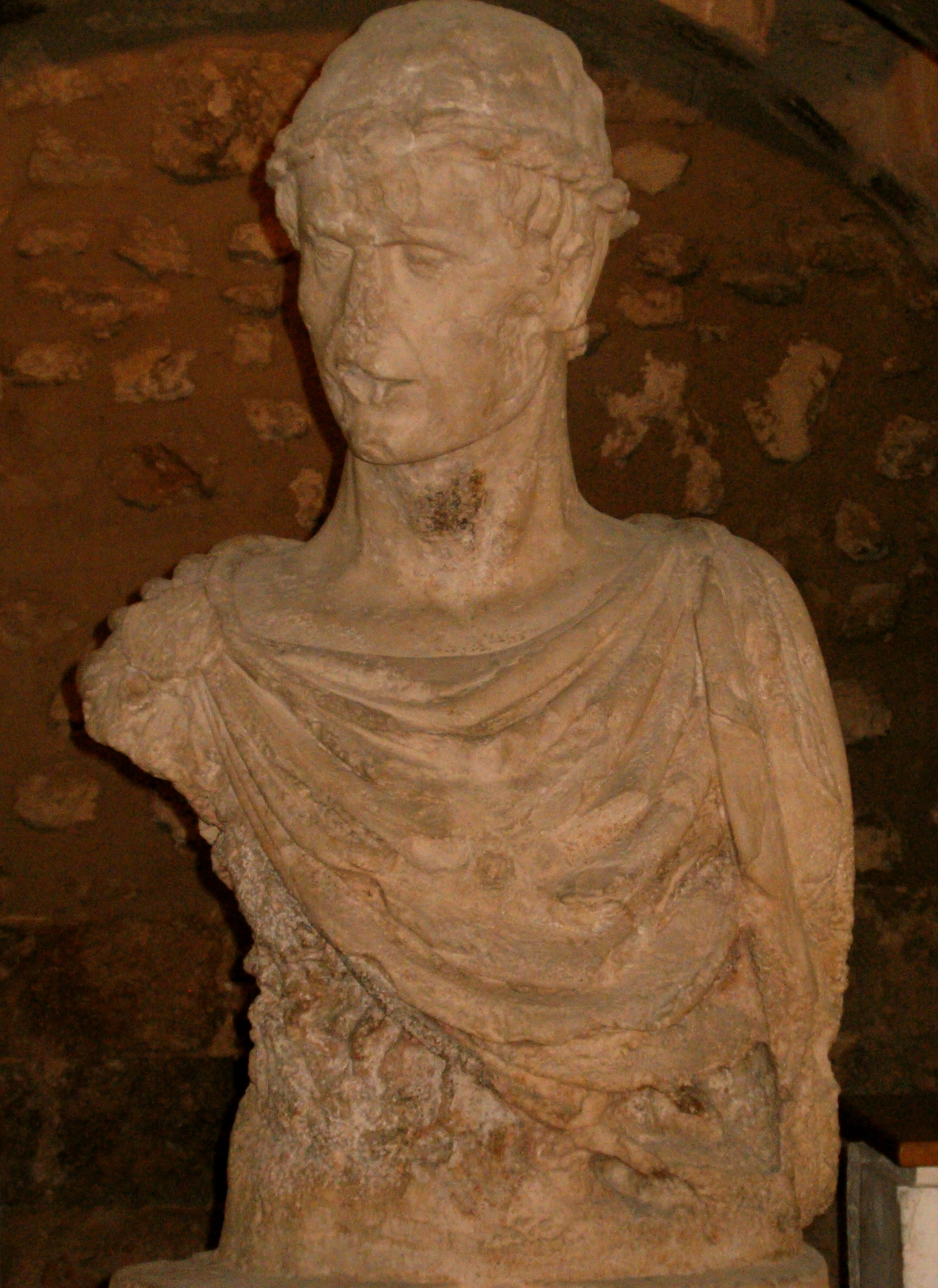
Federico II, young

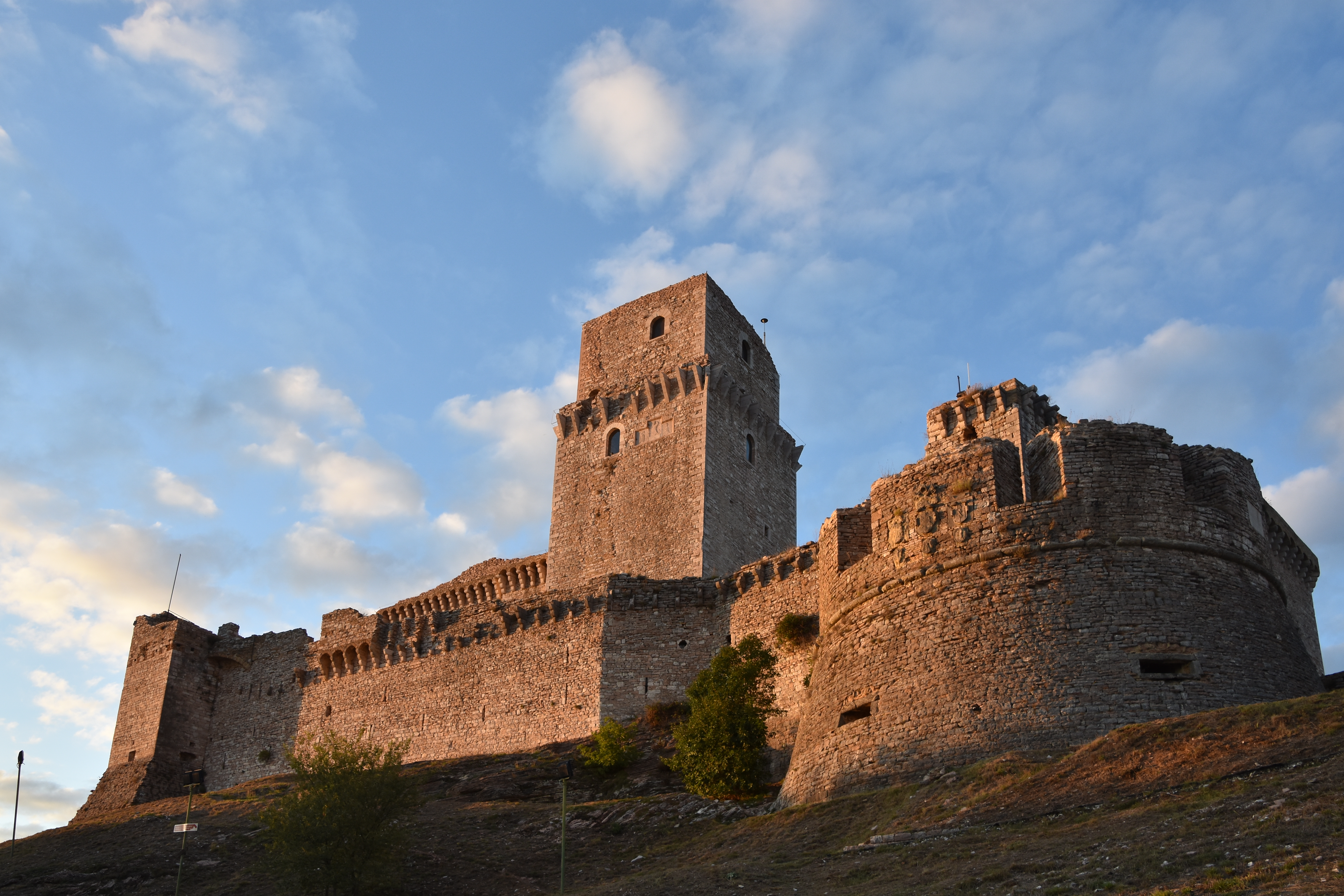
In evening light, Sep '19

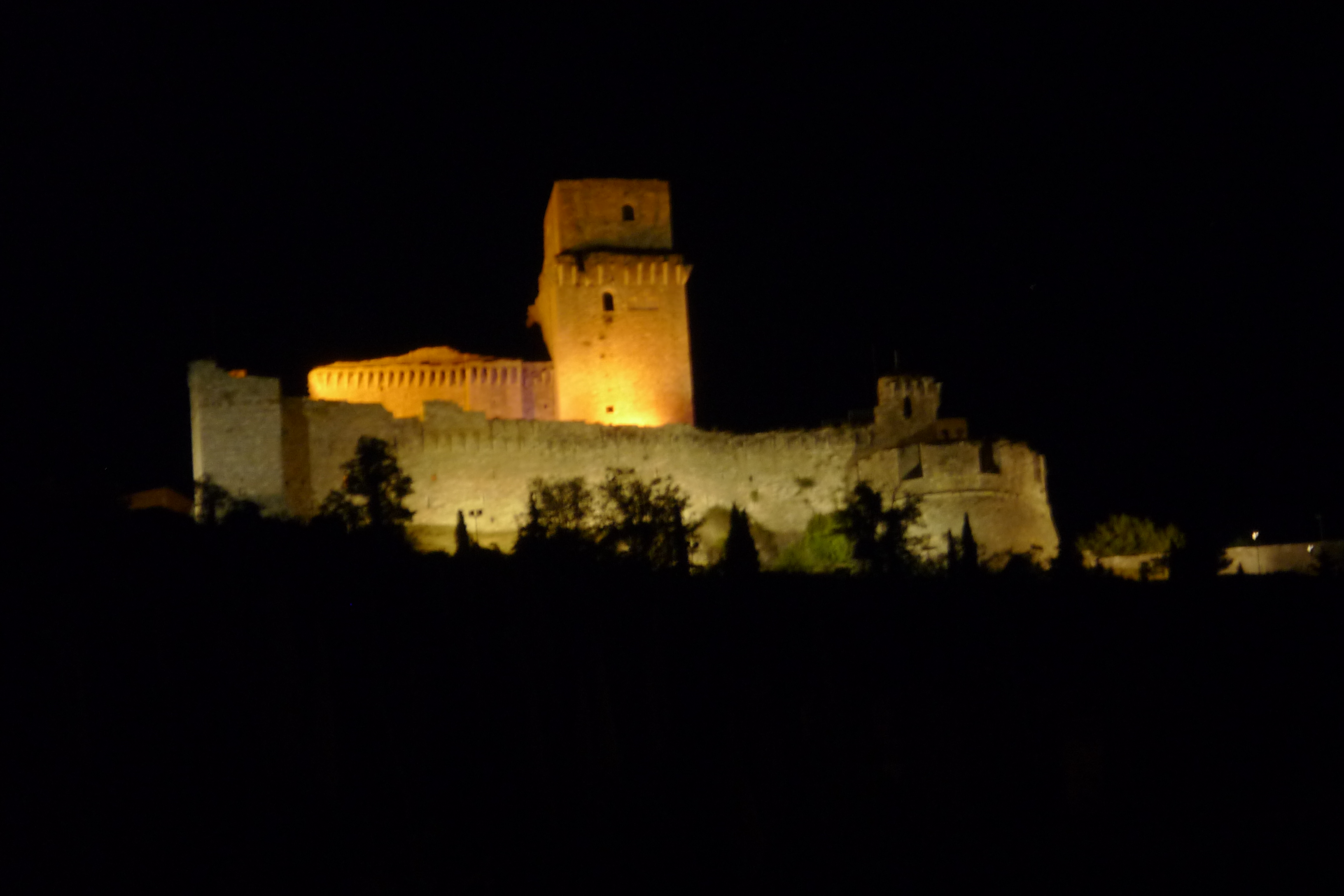
The fortress, at night

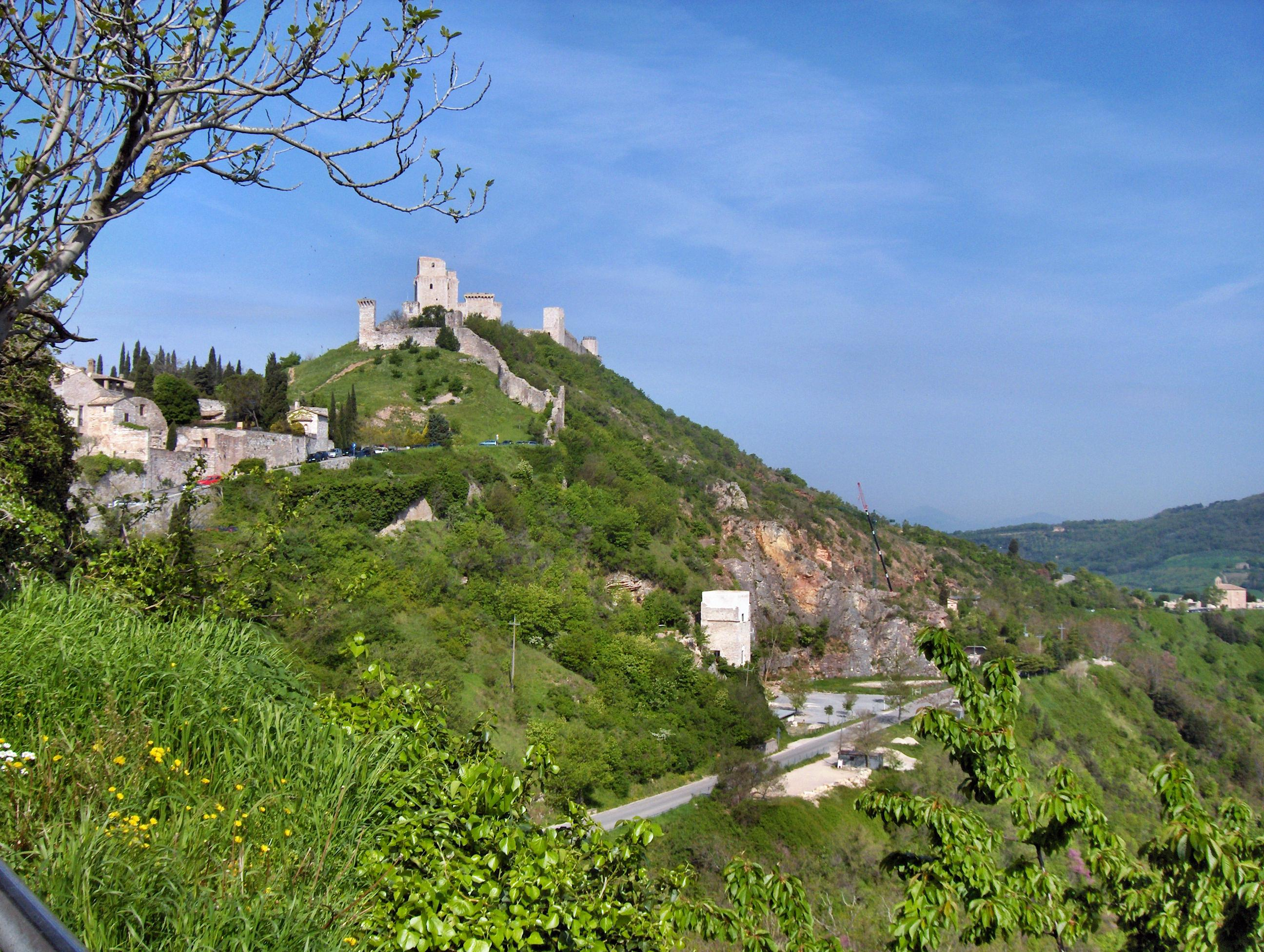
View of the fortress, Apr '08

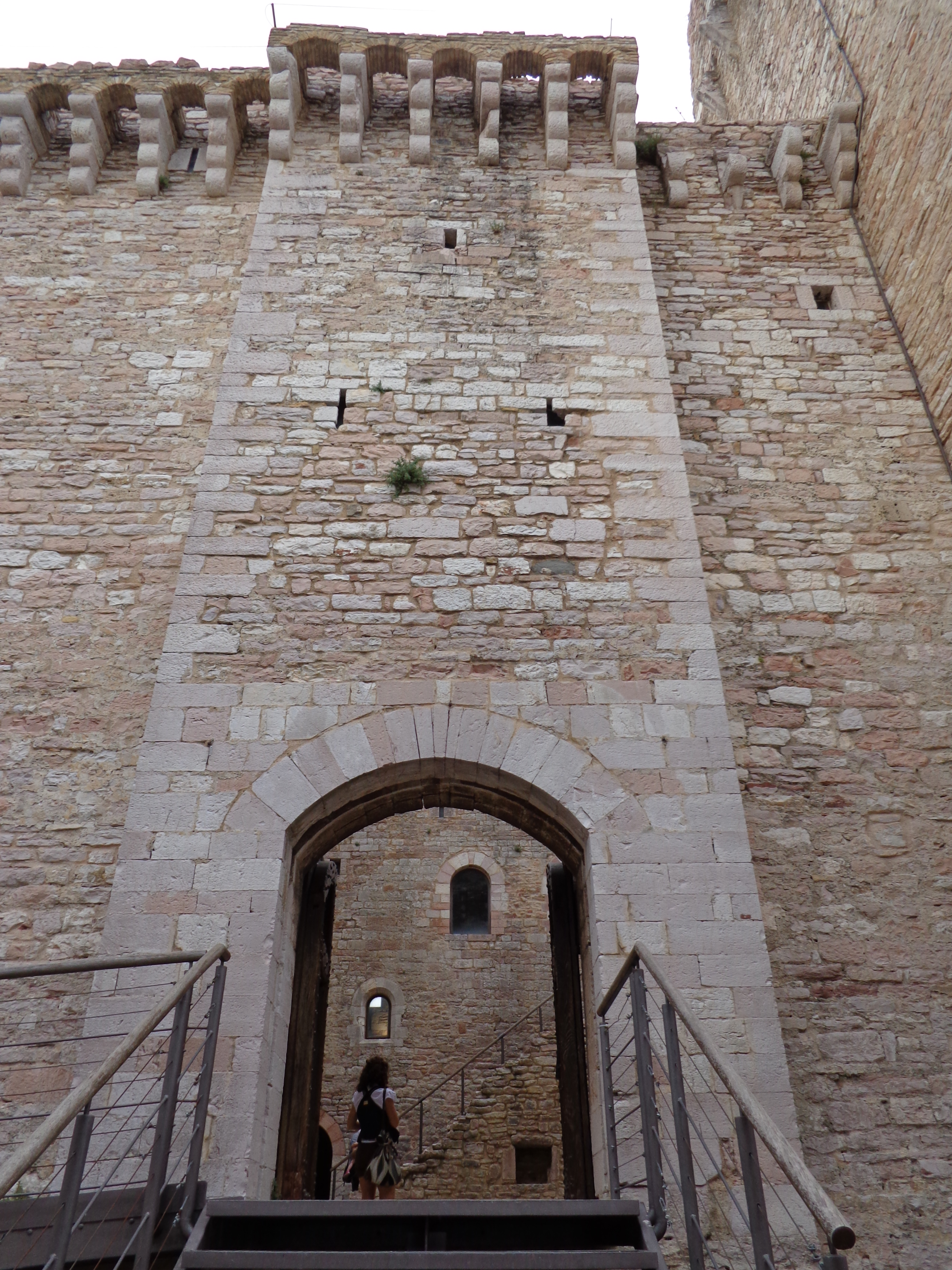
The entrance

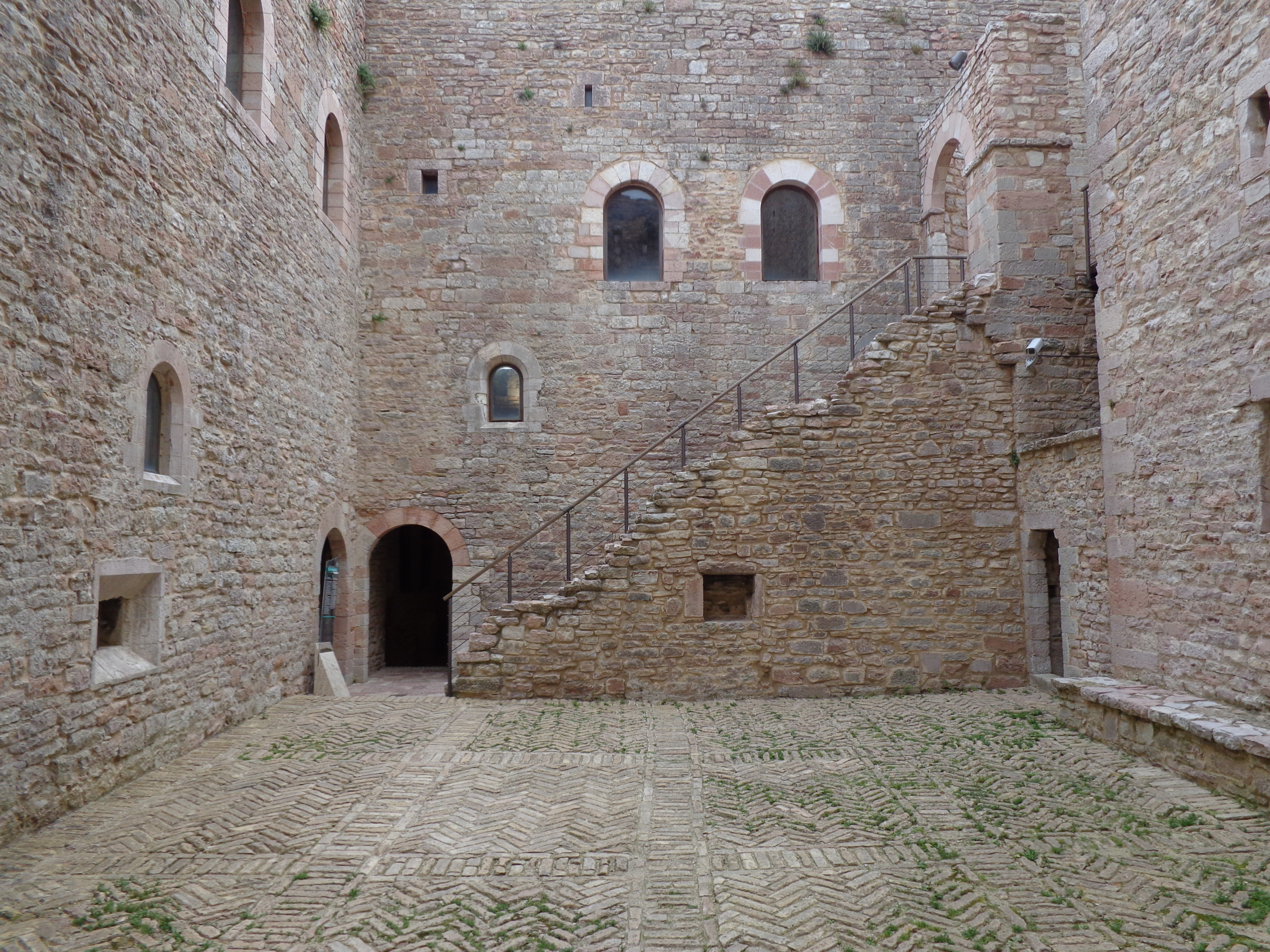
The enclosed courtyard

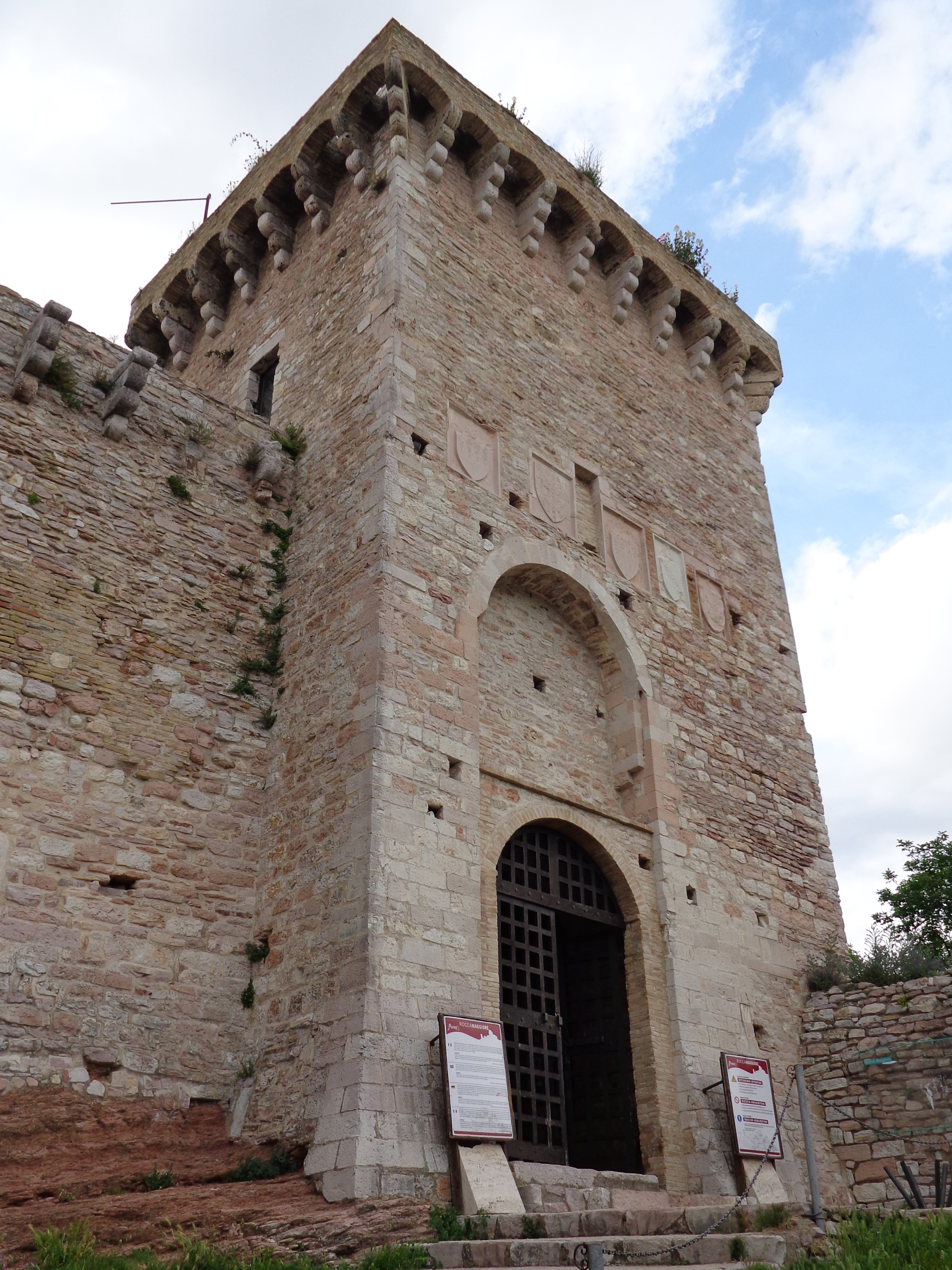
the tower

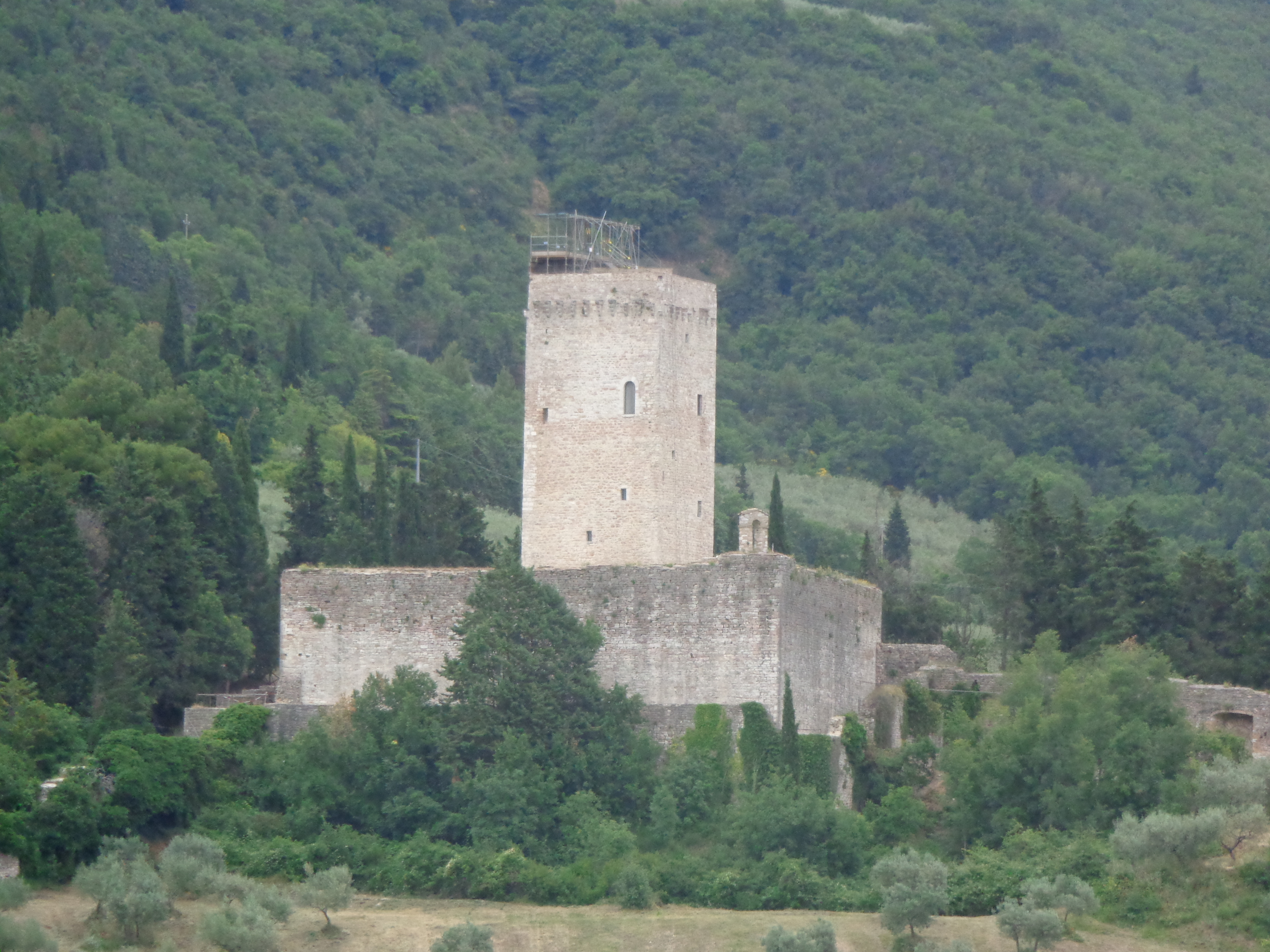
The fortress Minor

== See also ==
Assisi

== Bibliography ==
- AA. VV., Umbria, Touring Club Italiano, Perugia, 2004.
- Daniel Amoni, Castelli, rocche e fortezze dell'Umbria, Quattroemme, Perugia, 1999.
- Georgina Masson, Frederick II, Rusconi, Milan, 1978.
