= Peter Murray (art historian) =

British art historian

- Born: Peter John Murray; 23 April 1920; London
- Died: 20 April 1992 (aged 71); Farnborough, Warwickshire
- Education: Birkbeck College
- Occupations: Art historian and professor
- Spouse: Linda Murray (1913–2004)

Peter John Murray (23 April 1920 – 20 April 1992) was a British art historian and the Professor of History of Art at Birkbeck College, London from 1967 to 1980. Together with his wife, Linda Murray (1913–2004), he wrote primers on Italian Renaissance art which have been used by generations of students. In 1959 they published the highly successful Penguin Dictionary of Art and Artists, which was frequently updated and reissued. In 1963, they published two substantial introductory texts The Art of the Renaissance, and a book that became a classic primer The Architecture of the Renaissance.

Linda also wrote several books on her own, and completed their collaboration The Oxford Companion To Christian Art And Architecture (1996) after Peter died.

== Early life and education ==
Murray was born in 1920 in London. His parents were John Knowles Murray, an agricultural businessman, and Dorothy Catton (Murray). He went to King Edward VI School, Birmingham and Robert Gordon's College, Aberdeen. He trained as a painter at Gray's School of Art, Aberdeen, and at the Slade School of Fine Art, University of London, graduating in 1940.

Murray studied the history of art at the Courtauld Institute of Art, University of London, graduating in 1947. It was here that he met his wife, fellow student Linda Bramley (1913–2004). They married in 1947.

== Academic career ==
Murray lectured at the Courtauld Institute and Birkbeck College from 1948, while working on his PhD on the textual sources of Giotto's work. He received his PhD from the Courtauld Institute in 1956. In 1952, he became the librarian of the Witt Library at the Courtauld Institute (leaving this position in 1964) and in 1961 he was made senior research fellow at the college.

Murray moved to Birkbeck College, London in 1967 as Professor of Art History, succeeding Nikolaus Pevsner. He established history of art as an undergraduate discipline at the college, the subject previously having been taught outside the college's departmental structure. Murray retired as professor emeritus in 1980 and was succeeded by John Steer.

He was a gifted linguist, especially in German and Italian, and translated seminal art history texts into English, including Klassische Kunst, by Heinrich Wölfflin in 1952 and Die Geschichte der Renaissance by Jacob Burckhardt in 1985. He was the president of the Society of Architectural Historians of Great Britain from 1969 to 1972, and the chairman of the Walpole Society from 1978 to 1981.

== Murray Bequest ==
After his death in 1992 (Farnborough, Wiltshire), Linda Murray established the Murray Bequest at Birkbeck College. It funds support for students and research travel, as well as the Murray Research Studentship for part-time PhD research in the field of European art or architecture in the Middle Ages or Renaissance. It also funds the biennial Murray Memorial Lecture.

== Photography ==
Photographs by Peter Murray are held in the Conway Library at the Courtauld Institute of Art and are currently being digitised.

== Selected publications ==
Wölfflin, Heinrich, translated by Murray, P., Murray, L., 1952. Classic art: An introduction to the Italian Renaissance. Phaidon,
Murray, P., 1959. An index of attributions made in Tuscan sources before Vasari. L.S. Olschki.
Murray, P., Murray, L., 1959. Penguin dictionary of art and artists. Penguin.
Murray, P., Murray, L., 1963. The art of the renaissance, 'The World of Art Library' series. Thames & Hudson ISBN 9780500200087
Murray, P., 1963. The architecture of the Italian Renaissance. Batsford.
Kidson, P., Murray, P., Thompson, P., 1965. A history of English architecture. Penguin.
Murray, P., Murray, L., 1967. The High Renaissance and Mannerism, 'The World of Art Library' series. Thames & Hudson.
Burckhardt, Jacob., translated by Murray, P., 1985. The architecture of the Italian Renaissance. University of Chicago Press.
Murray, L., Murray, P., 1996. The Oxford Companion To Christian Art And Architecture. Oxford University Press.
