= Jerome Feldman =

American art historian

Jerome Feldman is professor of the history of art at Hawaii Pacific University where he specializes in the art of tribal Southeast Asia and the Pacific Islands. He was Slade Professor of Fine Art at the University of Cambridge for 2004–05.

== Selected publications ==
- The Eloquent Dead: Ancestral Sculpture of Indonesia and Southeast Asia. 1985. (Edited)
- The Art of Micronesia: The University of Hawaii Art Gallery. University of Hawaiʻi, 1986.
- Nias Tribal Treasures: Cosmic Reflections in Stone, Wood, and Gold. Delf, 1990. ISBN 9789071423055
- Arc of the Ancestors: Indonesian Art from the Jerome L. Joss Collection at UCLA. Fowler Museum of Cultural History, University of California, Los Angeles, 1994. ISBN 9780930741358
- Mentawai Art. Archipelago Press, 1999. (joint) ISBN 9789813018228
