= Albert Blankert =

Dutch art historian (1940–2022)

Albert Blankert (16 June 1940 – 22 November 2022) was a Dutch art historian and expert in 17th century Dutch painting and the art of Johannes Vermeer. He was Slade Professor of Fine Art at the University of Cambridge from 1999 to 2000.

== Selected publications ==
- Vermeer of Delft: Complete edition of the paintings. Phaidon Press, 1978. ISBN 0714818194
- Gods saints & heroes: Dutch painting in the age of Rembrandt. 1980.*Rembrandt: A genius and his impact. National Gallery of Victoria, Melbourne; Waanders, Zwolle; 1997.
- Dutch classicism in seventeenth-century painting. Museum Boijmans van Beuningen, 1999. (Editor) ISBN 9056621211

== About Blankert ==
- Quention Buvelot: 'Levensbericht Albert Blankert'. In: Jaarboek van de Maatschappij der Nederlandse Letterkunde te Leiden, 2023-2024, p. 35-45 (in Dutch)
