= Daphne Reynolds =

English printmaker

- Born: Daphne Dent; 12 January 1918; Huddersfield, West Riding of Yorkshire, England
- Died: 12 December 2002 (aged 84); Bradfield St George, Suffolk, England
- Occupations: Painter; Printmaker
- Years active: 1950–2002
- Spouse: Graham Reynolds (m. 1943)

Daphne Reynolds (née Dent; 12 January 1918 – 12 December 2002) was an English printmaker in mezzotint and painter. She began painting full-time in 1950, with her earliest works produced from watercolours and later oil. One of her painting was selected by Harold Wilson, the Prime Minister, to be hung as a decoration in his study in 10 Downing Street. Reynolds became known for her studying of the arid landscapes of Arizona and New Mexico in 1968 but switched to mezzotint printmaking in middle-age. From 1964 to 1967, she was chair of the Women's International Art Club and was a fellow of the Printmakers Council. A memoir of Reynolds was written and published by her husband Graham Reynolds for close friends of the couple in 2007.

== Early life ==
Reynolds was born in Huddersfield, West Riding of Yorkshire on 12 January 1918. She was the daughter of the portrait photographer Thomas Dent and his wife, Florence Nightingale, née Haskett. Reynolds was first educated at Wentworth School, Huddersfield. She went on to study at the Huddersfield College of Art from 1934 to 1937, and by that time, the Great Depression undermined her father's photography business, causing her to join the Professional Photographers' Association. Reynolds joined the local ARP unit when the Second World War broke out, and was transferred to become a teleprinter operator at the headquarters of the Civil Defence Service in London in 1941.

== Career ==
Her career as a full-time painter began in around 1950, contributing to mixed exhibitions in London and Paris. Reynolds' earliest works were out of watercolours, that were "somewhat in the style of neo-romantic landscapes of the 1940s". The subjects that featured in her earliest paintings such as landscapes and studies of animals and plants became a familiar feature in her later work. Reynolds began to experiment with abstract forms of expression from 1957 when American Abstract Expressionism became dominant in both Europe and the United States. She also made large oil paintings, one of which The Watcher was selected by Harold Wilson, the Prime Minister, for decoration in his study in 10 Downing Street. In 1964, she began to become a regular visitor to Suffolk. Reynolds requested that Georgia O'Keeffe take part in an exhibition sponsored by the Women's International Art Club in London in 1966.

In 1968, Reynolds grew bored while on a trip to Connecticut and hired a car to wander across the United States. She developed a like of desert scenery while producing sketches in Arizona and New Mexico and made a series of small Indian ink and gouache pictures to capture Reynolds' reaction to South America's arid landscapes and sunsets. In 1973, Reynolds went to Australia, Iran, New Zealand and Thailand, producing more sketches. By that time, she began a career in printmaking while in middle-age, studying under Anthony Gross at the Slade School of Fine Art. She admired Gross' engraving and painting and collected his works and found inspiration from John Atkinson Grimshaw, Caspar David Friedrich, J. M. W. Turner, Bill Brandt's black-and-white abstract photographs and Hamaguchi's large mezzotints. Reynolds was encouraged by Gross to take up mezzotint, and was included in The Mezzotint Rediscovered exhibition of P. & D. Colnaghi & Co. in 1974, and wrote essays about mezzotint. She used daily use objects such as kettles, irons and tin openers in her printmaking.

She was featured in the 1982 exhibition 80 Prints by Modern Masters at Angela Flowers Gallery and contributed to the publication of A Tribute to Birgit Skiöld in the following year. Reynolds won the Barcham Green Award at the 1985–86 Royal Society of Painter-Etchers and Engravers. She went on a trip to Japan in the 1980s and grew more interested in mezzotint, leading her to include Mount Fuji and Shinto shines in her small black-and-white works. Reynolds frequently contributed to the Small is Beautiful series of galleries at Flowers East Gallery. Her work was included in the 1991 exhibition A Survey of Influential East Anglian Artists at the Chappel Galleries, Essex and continued to exhibit in the gallery. Reynolds was chair of the Women's International Art Club from 1964 to 1967, served as the first chair of the Gainsborough's House Print Workshop, Sudbury, Suffolk between 1978 and 1979, and was fellow of the Printmakers Council.

== Personal life ==
She was married to the art historian and museum curator Graham Reynolds from 6 February 1943 until her death from heart failure at their home in Bradfield St George, Suffolk on 12 December 2002. They did not have any children.

== Legacy ==
Michael Kauffman called Reynolds "a Yorkshire woman of great human warmth, and neither her jollity nor her outspokenness were affected by years of living in the south." Her pictures are held in galleries such as Arts Council England, the British Museum, the Auckland Art Gallery Toi o Tāmaki, the National Gallery of Victoria and the Victoria and Albert Museum. Reynolds' husband wrote Daphne Reynolds: A Memoir in 2007 and sold copies of the book for close friends of the couple.
