= William J. R. Curtis =

William J.R. Curtis Writings

William J. R. Curtis (born 21 March 1948, in Birchington-on-Sea, Kent, England) is an architectural historian whose writings have focused on twentieth century architecture. Curtis seems particularly interested in broadening the "canon" to include a wider range of architects working across the world.

Curtis was educated at the Courtauld Institute of Art, London (First Class Honours, 1970), and Harvard University (Ph.D., 1975). He has taught history and theory of architecture in the United States, Mexico, Europe, Asia, and Australia. He was Slade Professor of Fine Art at the University of Cambridge in the 2003/4 academic year.

Curtis's most important work is Modern Architecture Since 1900, first published in 1982, and now in its third edition (1996). The book illustrates the modern paradigm in architecture emerging from the social, technological, and urban contexts in the 19th century, and seeks to pursue its diverse processes in diverse geographies and times, rejecting the understandings of modernism as a homogenic entity. This book won the Alice Davis Hitchcock Medallion of the Society of Architectural Historians of Great Britain in 1984. The third edition was awarded the architecture book prize of the American Institute of Architects in 1997. In 2006 the Museum of Finnish Architecture awarded Curtis its Commemoration Medal of Foundation on the occasion of the museum's 50th anniversary and in 2014 he received the Golden Award for Global Contribution to Architecture (CERA, India).

Curtis has created some of his own art which has been exhibited at Harvard. An exhibition of Curtis’s architectural photographs Architectures du Monde: Le Regard de William J.R. Curtis took place at the Centre Méridional de l’Architecture et de la Ville in Toulouse in 2004-5 and at the Forum de l’Urbanisme et de l’Architecture in Nice in summer 2005. The Structures of Light, an exhibition of his photographs, accompanied by a book, was shown at the Alvar Aalto Museum in Jyväskylä in 2007. Photographs attributed to Curtis are held in the Conway Library whose archive, of primarily architectural images, is being digitised under the wider Courtauld Connects project.

He currently lives in southwestern France.

== Writings ==
- Curtis, William J. R., and Sekler, Eduard F. [1978], Le Corbusier at Work: The Genesis of the Carpenter Center for the Visual Arts, Harvard University Press, Cambridge MA 1978, ISBN 0-674-52059-9
- Curtis, William J. R. [1982], Modern Architecture Since 1900 Phaidon Press, Oxford 1982; Prentice-Hall, Englewood NJ 1982; second edition 1987, third edition Phaidon, Oxford 1996, ISBN 0-7148-3524-2
- Curtis, William J. R. [1986], Le Corbusier: Ideas and Forms, Phaidon, Oxford 1986, ISBN 0-7148-2387-2, Rizzoli, New York 1986, ISBN 0-8478-0726-6
- Curtis, William J. R. [1988], Balkrishna Doshi: An Architecture for India, Rizzoli, New York 1988, ISBN 0-8478-0937-4
- Curtis, William J. R. [1994], Denys Lasdun: Architecture, City, Landscape, Phaidon Press, London 1994, ISBN 0-7148-2871-8
- Curtis, William J. R. [2001], Abstractions in Space: Tadao Ando, Ellsworth Kelly, Richard Serra Pulitzer Foundation, St. Louis
- Curtis, William J. R. [2004], Teodoro Gonzalez de Leon: Obra Completa/Complete Works, Arquine, Reverte, Mexico
- Curtis, William J. R. [2004], Barcelona 1992-2004, Gustavo Gili, Barcelona
- Curtis, William J. R. [2004], RCR Aranda, Pigem, Vilalta Arquitectes, Gustavo Gili, Barcelona.
