= Paul Binski =

British medievalist (born 1956)

- Born: 9 November 1956 (age 69)

Academic background
- Education: Gonville and Caius College, Cambridge

Paul Binski FSA FBA (born 9 November 1956) is a British art historian and Emeritus Professor of the History of Medieval Art at the University of Cambridge.

== Early life and education ==
Binski was born to Eugene and Pamela Binski in 1956. He was educated at Harrow School before going up to Gonville and Caius College, Cambridge (BA 1979, MA; PhD 1984).

== Academic career ==
Binski was a Research Fellow at Gonville and Caius College, Cambridge until 1987 when he went to America to take up a Getty Postdoctoral award which he held at Princeton University, before moving to Yale University as an assistant professor. In 1991, he returned to the UK to work at Manchester University as a lecturer, before moving back to Cambridge in 1995. He was Slade Professor of Fine Art at the University of Oxford between 2006 and 2007.

Binski was elected a Fellow of the British Academy in 2007. He is also a Fellow of the Society of Antiquaries, London.

Binski specialises in Western European medieval art and architecture and art theory. In August 2021 he was honoured by the publication of a festschrift which includes contributions from many of his international colleagues and students.

== Bibliography ==
- The Painted Chamber at Westminster (1986)
- Pintores (1991)
- Westminster Abbey and the Plantagenets: kingship and the representation of power, 1200–1400 (1995)
- Medieval Death: Ritual and Representation (1996)
- New Offerings, Ancient Treasures: essays in medieval art in honour of George Henderson (2001)
- Becket's Crown: Art and Imagination in Gothic England, 1170–1300 (2004)
- Peterborough Cathedral 2001-2006: from Devastation to Restoration, with The Very Revd Michael Bunker. Paul Holberton Publishing, London 2006. ISBN 978 1 903470 55 8.
- Western Illuminated Manuscripts: A Catalogue of the Collection in Cambridge University Library (2011)
- Gothic Wonder: Art, Artifice, and the Decorated Style, 1290-1350 (Yale University Press, 2014)
- Gothic Sculpture (Yale University Press, 2019)

=== As editor ===
- Age of Chivalry: Art in Plantagenet England, 1200-1400, with Jonathan Alexander (Royal Academy of Arts, 1987)
- New offerings, ancient treasures. Studies in medieval art for George Henderson (2001)
- The Westminster Retable: History, Technique, Conservation (2009)
- Patrons and Professionals in the Middle Ages: Proceedings of the 2010 Harlaxton Symposium (2012)
