= Graham Reynolds (art historian) =

English art historian

Graham Reynolds in 1990

Arthur Graham Reynolds CVO OBE FBA (10 January 1914 – 13 October 2013) was an English art historian who was Keeper of Paintings at the Victoria and Albert Museum. He was a leading expert on portrait miniatures and the art of John Constable, for whose works he wrote the catalogue raisonné. Reynolds's approach exemplified traditional scholarship and connoisseurship and he was fiercely opposed to the New Art History of the 1970s.

== Early life ==
Arthur Graham Reynolds was born in Highgate, London, in 1914. He attended Highgate School on a scholarship and subsequently went up to Queens' College, Cambridge, to read mathematics but switched to English literature.

== Career ==
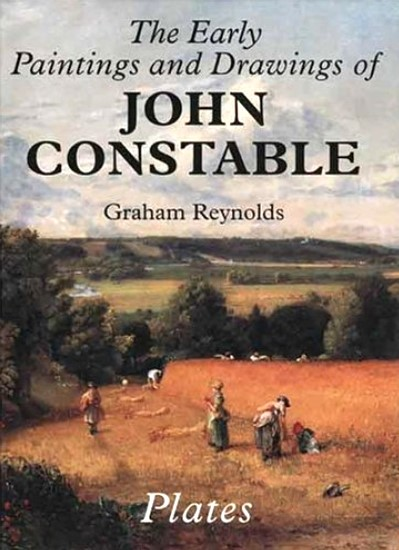
A volume from Graham Reynolds's catalogue raisonné of John Constable.

Reynolds joined the Victoria and Albert Museum (V&A) in 1937, rising to the position of Keeper of the department of prints and drawings (replacing James Laver) and also of paintings with only a break during the Second World War when he worked for the Ministry of Home Security (1939–1945). He became a leading expert on portrait miniatures and the art of John Constable. In 1968 he was a visiting professor at Yale University.

Early in his career Reynolds wrote a résumé of the life and work of Thomas Bewick (1949), a work on Elizabethan and Jacobean costume and a book on English portrait miniatures (1952) that was revised and reissued by Cambridge University Press in 1988. In 1953 he produced a survey of Victorian painting. He wrote two of the Thames & Hudson World of Art series, Turner in 1969 and A concise history of watercolours in 1971. In 1960 he produced a catalogue of paintings by Constable in the V&A, which was issued in a revised edition in 1973. His catalogue raisonne of the paintings of John Constable was published in two parts (two volumes each) in 1984 and 1996, divided at 1816, the year of Constable's marriage to Maria Bicknell.

In 1947, Reynolds curated an exhibition at the V&A to mark the 400th anniversary of the birth of the miniaturist Nicholas Hilliard using the extensive collection of miniatures at the museum. The exhibition helped to differentiate Hilliard from Isaac Oliver and Reynolds wrote the accompanying monograph and catalogue.

Reynolds retired from the V&A in 1974 and moved to Suffolk with his wife. He remained active in art circles, and was appointed a member of the advisory council of the Paul Mellon Centre for Studies in British Art in which capacity he served from 1977 to 1984. He was implacably opposed to the New Art History of the 1970s and later which he saw as threatening traditional scholarship and connoisseurship. In 1983 he chose paintings for the Metropolitan Museum of Art's exhibition Constable's England.

== Personal life ==
At the Ministry of Home Security, Reynolds met the artist and printmaker Daphne Dent (1918–2002) whom he married in the City of London in 1943. Outside art, Reynolds had a talent for palindromic poems, some of which were published.

Reynolds was appointed OBE in 1984, CVO in 2000 and elected a fellow of the British Academy in 1993.

== Death ==
Graham Reynolds died on 13 October 2013 at age 99.

== Selected publications ==
- Nicholas Hilliard and Isaac Oliver. An Exhibition to Commemorate the 400th Anniversary of the Birth of N. Hilliard. Victoria and Albert Museum, London, 1947.
- Thomas Bewick. A Résumé of His Life and Work. Art & Technics, London, 1949.
- Costume of the Western World: Elizabethan and Jacobean 1558–1625. George G. Harrap, London, 1951.
- English Portrait Miniatures. A & C Black, London, 1952. (revised edition Cambridge University Press, 1988)
- Painters of the Victorian Scene. Batsford, 1953.
- Catalogue of the Constable Collection. Her Majesty's Stationery Office, London, 1960. (2nd 1973)
- Constable: The Natural Painter. 1965.
- Turner. Thames & Hudson, London, 1969. ('The World of Art Library' series) ISBN 0500180911
- A Concise History of Watercolours. Thames & Hudson, London, 1971. ('The World of Art Library' series) ISBN 0500181152
- Catalogue of Miniatures. Wallace Collection, London, 1980.
- Constable's England. Weidenfeld & Nicolson, London, 1983. ISBN 978-0297783596
- The Later Paintings and Drawings of John Constable. Yale University Press, New Haven, 1984. (two volumes) ISBN 978-0300031515
- The Early Paintings and Drawings of John Constable. Yale University Press, New Haven, 1996. (two volumes) ISBN 978-0300063370
- European Miniatures in the Metropolitan Museum of Art. Metropolitan Museum of Art, New York, 1996. (With Katharine Baetjer) ISBN 978-0870998089
- British Portrait Miniatures. Cambridge University Press, Cambridge, 1998. (Fitzwilliam Museum Handbooks) ISBN 978-0521592024
- The Sixteenth and Seventeenth-century Miniatures in the Collection of Her Majesty the Queen. Royal Collection Trust, 1999. ISBN 978-1902163451
