= John Aiken (sculptor) =

Irish sculptor (born 1950)

John Aiken (born 1950) is an Irish sculptor who is professor of fine arts and director of the Academy of Visual Arts at Hong Kong Baptist University. He was previously Slade Professor of Fine Arts and director of the Slade School of Fine Art at University College London from 2000 to 2012.

== Early life ==
Aiken was born in Belfast, Northern Ireland, in 1950. He received his art training at the Chelsea School of Art (1968–1973) and was a Rome Scholar in Sculpture at the British School in Rome.

== Career ==
He taught at the Art and Design Centre of the University of Ulster and was the Slade Professor of Fine Arts and director of the Slade School of Fine Art at University College London from 2000 to 2012. Since 2012 he has been professor of fine arts and director of the Academy of Visual Arts, Hong Kong Baptist University.
