= William Gaunt (art historian) =

British artist and art historian

William Gaunt (/ɡɔːnt/; 1900–1980) was a British artist and art historian, best known for his books on British 19th-century art.

Born the son of a graphic designer and chromolithographer, Gaunt dabbled in drawing and writing as a youth. In 1914, after winning a literary contest in The Connoisseur for an essay on Shakespeare's The Tempest, his thoughts seriously turned to becoming a critic. He served briefly in World War I, fighting in the Durham Light Infantry in 1918, until the war ended that year. The following year he attended Worcester College, Oxford, where he read modern history and participated in the Art Society. At Oxford, his friends included John Rothenstein and Cyril Connolly. Graduating with honours in 1922, he studied at the Ruskin School of Drawing and wrote reviews of art exhibitions.

He worked as a free-lance contributor for The Studio magazine, editing several special issues. Gaunt was fascinated by the Pre-Raphaelites, at that time undervalued as Victorian. He published in 1942 his most enduring title on that subject, The Pre-Raphaelite Tragedy. He completed an M.A. in 1926. In 1930 he published a collection of his drawings, called London Promenade. 1935 he married Mary Catherine Reilly Connolly (died, 1980). The years 1930-39 were spent writing literary and artistic criticism, including The Pre-Raphaelite Tragedy. During the Second World-War, he took a special appointment for the war effort and researched for the book The Aesthetic Adventure. The Gaunts lived in a country cottage near the Surrey-Hampshire border.

== Selected publications ==
- The Pre-Raphaelite Tragedy (1942); reprinted as The Pre-Raphaelite Dream (1943)
- The Aesthetic Adventure (1945)
- The March of the Moderns (1949)
- Victorian Olympus (1952)
- Renoir (1952)
- The Lady in the Castle (1956); a novel
- Arrows of Desire: A Study of William Blake and His Romantic World (1956)
- The Observer's Book of Painting and Graphic Art (1958)
- Everyman's Dictionary of Pictorial Art. Vols. 1 & 2 (1962) Editor
- The Observer's Book of Modern Art: From Impressionism to the Present Day (1964)
- A Concise History of English Painting (1964) Thames & Hudson, 'The World of Art Library' series.
- The Observer's Book of Sculpture (1966)
- Flemish Cities: Their History and Art (1969)
- The Impressionists (1970)
- William De Morgan (1971) co-author with M. D. E. Clayton-Stamm
- Turner (1971) Phaidon, 'Colour Library' series.
- Renoir (1971) Phaidon, 'Colour Library' series.
- The Great Century of British Painting: Hogarth to Turner (1971)
- Restless Century: Painting in Britain, 1800-1900 (1972)
- Marine Painting: An Historical Survey (1975)
- The World of William Hogarth (1978)
- Court Painting in England from Tudor to Victorian Times (1980)
- The Golden Age of Flemish Art (1983)
- Painters of Fantasy: From Hieronymus Bosch to Salvador Dalí (1986)
