= Michael Levey =

British art historian (1927–2008)

Sir Michael Levey LVO FBA FRSL
- Born: 8 June 1927; Wimbledon, London, England
- Died: 28 December 2008 (aged 81)
- Education: Exeter College, Oxford
- Occupation: Art historian
- Notable work: From Rococo to Revolution (1966); The Early Renaissance (1967)
- Spouse: Brigid Brophy (m. 1954)
- Children: 1
- Awards: Hawthornden Prize

Sir Michael Vincent Levey, LVO, FBA, FRSL (8 June 1927 – 28 December 2008) was a British art historian, known for his works on general history of Western art. From 1973 to 1986, he served as the director of the National Gallery.

== Biography ==
Levey was born in Wimbledon, London, and grew up in Leigh-on-Sea, Essex. He attended The Oratory School, a Catholic boarding school near Reading. He was called up for National Service in 1945 and served it largely in Egypt. After demobilisation in 1948, Levey went to Exeter College, Oxford, to read English; he graduated with first class honours after only two years' study.

In 1951, Levey joined the National Gallery as assistant to the Keeper, Sir Martin Davies. He combined administrative duties with scholarly work, producing his first catalogue, on the Gallery's 18th-century Italian paintings, in 1956. In the 1960s, affordable art books with colour reproductions for the general reader began to appear, and Levey was commissioned to write an overview of Western painting for Thames & Hudson's World of Art series. The resulting book, A Concise History of Painting: From Giotto to Cézanne (1962), remains a classic overview of European art history from the introduction of perspective in Italy to the beginnings of modern art at the start of the 20th century.

From 1963 to 1964, Levey was Slade Professor of Fine Art at Cambridge University; his lectures were published as From Rococo to Revolution in 1966. The Early Renaissance, written a year later, is considered another milestone in popular art publishing, and was the first non-fiction work to win the Hawthornden Prize for Literature. Levey became deputy Keeper of the National Gallery in 1966, Keeper in 1968, and Director in 1973. He was knighted in 1981.

He relinquished his directorship to care for his wife, the novelist and critic Brigid Brophy, after she was diagnosed with multiple sclerosis in 1985; the disease ultimately claimed her life. Brophy and Levey were married in 1954 and had one daughter Kate Levey (b. 1957).

Levey was a Distinguished Supporter of the British Humanist Association.

His memoir, The Chapel is on Fire, recounts his upbringing and was published in 2000.

== Honours ==
Levey was appointed Member of the Royal Victorian Order, 4th Class (MVO - later renamed Lieutenant/LVO) in the 1965 Birthday Honours. He was knighted in the 1981 New Year Honours.

He was elected a Fellow of the British Academy (FBA) in 1983, and a Fellow of the Royal Society of Literature (FRSL) in 1980.

== Selected publications ==
- The German School; National Gallery Catalogues, 1959, National Gallery, London
- Pictures in the Royal Collection, The Later Italian Pictures, 1964, Phaidon Press, London
- A Concise History of Painting: From Giotto to Cézanne, Thames & Hudson 'The World of Art Library' series (ISBN 0-500-20024-6).
- Painting at Court, 1971, Weidenfeld and Nicolson, London.
- Early Renaissance, 1967, Penguin
- The 17th and 18th century Italian Schools; National Gallery Catalogues, 1971, National Gallery, London, ISBN 0901791091
- The Life & Death of Mozart, 1971, Weidenfeld and Nicolson (ISBN 0-297-00477-8).
- From Rococo to Revolution: Major Trends in Eighteenth-Century Painting. Thames & Hudson 'The World of Art Library' series
- The Case of Walter Pater, 1978, Thames & Hudson.
- The National Gallery Collection, 1987, National Gallery Publications, ISBN 0947645349
- Painting and Sculpture in France, 1700-1789, Pelican History of Art, 1993
- Florence, a Portrait, 1996, Jonathan Cape.

Academic offices
Preceded by Ernst Gombrich	Slade Professor of Fine Art, Cambridge University; 1964	Succeeded by John Pope-Hennessy
Preceded by Juliet Wilson-Bareau	Slade Professor of Fine Art, Oxford University; 1994–1995	Succeeded by John Richardson
