= Back-To-School Essentials =

2019 PSA by Sandy Hook Promise

- Frame from the opening scene
- Agency: BBDO New York
- Client: Sandy Hook Promise
- Release date: September 18, 2019
- Directed by: Henry-Alex Rubin
- Production company: SMUGGLER
- Country: United States

"Back-To-School Essentials" is a 2019 public service announcement (PSA) by American 501(c)(3) non-profit organization Sandy Hook Promise. Created as a shock piece, the PSA received the 2020 Primetime Emmy Award for Outstanding Commercial.

== Description ==
The PSA initially mimics a typical back-to-school advertisement, featuring students proudly displaying new school supplies like binders and headphones to upbeat music. Suddenly, a school shooting erupts, forcing the students to repurpose their items for survival. Examples include a boy breaking a window with a skateboard, a girl fashioning a sock into a tourniquet for her friend's bleeding leg, and two children using scissors and colored pencils as improvised weapons against the shooter. The PSA culminates with a girl tearfully texting her mother "I love you" before closing her eyes as the sounds of an approaching shooter are heard.

== Background ==
"Back-To-School Essentials" was created by SHP through advertising agency network BBDO New York, with a media budget of US$37 thousand directly, with media otherwise being donated. The PSA had an intentional launch time set for the "back-to-school period" in order to "remind people of the new normal, that kids are being taught how to survive shootings." The 66-second long PSA was directed by Henry-Alex Rubin and produced by SMUGGLER.

According to SHP co-founder Mark Barden, the PSA's shocking nature was intentional and "designed to spark conversations about prioritizing the prevention of violent acts in school and aims to promote a more hands-on approach to ending violence."

== Reception ==
"Back-To-School Essentials" was viewed 26 million times within 24 hours of its release, during which SHP generated US$100 thousand in donations. It further generated 3.9 billion total impressions through 4,400 media stories. In total, US$7.6 million was generated from the PSA's media coverage. The PSA was further shared on Twitter by politicians including Kamala Harris and Bill de Blasio.

Will Burns of Forbes viewed the PSA as one that, in contrast to SHP's previous PSA's, prioritizes fear over its message, describing it as being "about generating fear that gun violence will take place in your school." Heidi Stevens of the Chicago Tribune initially expressed feelings of resentment towards the PSA, though later acknowledges it as her own "short-sightedness" upon further reflection regarding the grim reality of American children facing the "trauma of a school shooting [being] a possibility they wake up to and walk into every single weekday, from preschool through college."

=== Awards and nominations ===
Following its release, "Back-To-School Essentials" received the 2020 Primetime Emmy Award for Outstanding Commercial during the 72nd Primetime Emmy Awards. During the 2020 Webby Awards, it was nominated under the "Public Service & Activism (Branded)" category, of which they won the Webby People's Voice Award, while receiving a Webby Award under the "Best Viral PR Campaign" category. It received "Silver Honor" in the "Call To Action" category during the Shorty Awards, as well as the first "Storytelling for Good Award" during the Clio Awards. During the 2022 IPA Effectiveness Awards, "Back-To-School Essentials" received the Silver award as well as the "Best Small Budget" award.
