= Michael Sullivan (art historian) =

Canadian-born British art historian (1916–2013)

- Born: Donovan Michael Sullivan; 29 October 1916; Toronto, Ontario, Canada
- Died: 28 September 2013 (aged 96); Oxford, England
- Education: University of Cambridge; Harvard University (PhD)
- Occupation: Art historian
- Spouse: Wu Huan

Donovan Michael Sullivan (Chinese: 蘇立文; 29 October 1916 – 28 September 2013) was a Canadian-born British art historian and collector, and one of the major Western pioneers in the field of modern Chinese art history and criticism.

Sullivan was born in Toronto, Ontario, and moved to England at the age of three. He was the youngest of five children of Alan Sullivan (pen name Sinclair Murray), a Canadian mining engineer turned novelist and his wife Elisabeth (née Hees). Sullivan was a graduate of Rugby School and graduated from the University of Cambridge in architecture in 1939. He was in China from 1940 to 1946 with the International and Chinese Red Cross followed by teaching and doing museum work in Chengdu, where he met and married Wu Huan (Khoan), a biologist who gave up her career to work with him.

He received a PhD from Harvard University (1952) and a post-doctoral Bollingen Fellowship. He subsequently taught in the University of Singapore, and returned to London in the 1960s to teach at the School of Oriental and African Studies. Then he became Christensen Professor of Chinese art in the Department of Art at Stanford University from 1966 to 1984, before moving to the University of Oxford as a Fellow by Special Election at St Catherine's College, Oxford. He lived in Oxford, England. He was Slade Professor of Fine Art at the University of Oxford for 1973–74.

Sullivan was a major art collector who owned more than 400 works of art, including paintings by Chinese masters Qi Baishi, Zhang Daqian, and Wu Guanzhong. His was one of the world's most significant collections of modern Chinese art. He bequeathed his collection to the Ashmolean Museum in Oxford, which has a gallery dedicated to Sullivan and his wife Khoan.

== Selected publications ==
- The Birth of Landscape Painting in China. University of California Press. 1962.
- Symbols of Eternity, Oxford University Press, 1979, ISBN 978-0-19-817351-9
- The Birth of Landscape Painting in China: The Sui and Tang dynasties. University of California Press. 1980. ISBN 978-0-520-03558-4.
- The Meeting of Eastern and Western Art. University of California Press. 1989. ISBN 978-0-520-05902-3.
- Art and Artists of Twentieth Century China. University of California Press. 1996. ISBN 978-0-520-07556-6.
- The Arts of China. University of California Press. 1973. ISBN 978-0-520-02548-6.; University of California Press, 1984, ISBN 978-0-520-04918-5 (revised edn of A Short History of Chinese Art, 1967)
- Modern Chinese art: the Khoan and Michael Sullivan collection. Ashmolean Museum. 2001. ISBN 978-1-85444-165-2.

== Reviews ==
- "Review: A Great Leap Forward for Modern Chinese Art History? Recent Publications in China and the United States-A Review Article", Ralph C. Croizier, The Journal of Asian Studies, Vol. 57, No. 3 (Aug., 1998), pp. 786–793
