= Gualtieri di San Lazzaro =

Gualtieri di San Lazzaro (1904–1974) was an Italian writer and art publisher. For the majority of his life, he resided in Paris where he published monographs focusing on the work of contemporary French and Italian artists. He was the founder of the periodical XXe Siècle.

== Early life ==
Gualtieri di San Lazzaro was born Giuseppe Papa in Catania in 1904 and was raised in Venice by his father. He assumed the pseudonym ‘Gualtieri di San Lazzaro’ when he launched his professional career in Rome in the early 1920s.

== Paris ==
In 1924 San Lazzaro moved to Paris. After having edited Les Chroniques du Jour, San Lazzaro established his own publishing house Ḗditions des Chroniques du Jour. In 1928 he published Les Maîtres Nouveaux, which focussed on mainly French and Italian painters and which was to be the first of two series of monographs on contemporary artists. The second series of monographs, XXe Siècle was introduced in 1929. The first volume was dedicated to Henri Matisse, authored by Florent Fels and co-published with Anton Zwemmer in London and E. Weyhe in New York. A volume on Pablo Picasso by Eugenio Ors was similarly co-published and represents the largest print run in the series at 650 copies in English and 550 in French.

== XXe Siècle ==
San Lazzaro launched the illustrated periodical XXe Siècle in 1938. Featuring high quality reproductions of varied visual imagery including Western paintings and Far-Eastern prints, the inclusion of original prints by contemporary artists in every issue was its defining feature. Artists who contributed to the periodical include Wassily Kandinsky, Hans Arp, Giorgio de Chirico and Joan Miró. The periodical was not published between 1939 and 1951.

After its relaunch in 1951, XXe Siècle engaged with more specific thematic, material-based issues such as mark making and concepts of space and also concentrated on the formation of an international dialogue between Italian and French artists including Marino Marini. The periodical was distributed in Italy by Carlo Cardazzo, the owner of the Naviglio Gallery in Milan, which became the site for San Lazarro's exhibitions of the work of contemporary French artists.

In 1968 Léon Amiel assumed control of XXe Siècle and in 1970 Amiel purchased the XXe Siècle Company. Until his death in 1974 San Lazzaro continued to publish books and albums of prints including the Homage to Marino Marini (New York, 1970) .

Following his death two exhibitions were dedicated to San Lazzaro: ‘Omaggio a XXe Siècle’ (Milan, December 1974) and ‘San Lazzaro et ses Amis’ (Musée d’Art Moderne, Paris 1975).

== Selected works ==
- Parigi era morta, Milano, Garzanti, 1947
- Parigi era viva, Milano, Garzanti, 1948
- Klee, 'The World of Art Library' series. London, Thames & Hudson, 1965

== Bibliography ==
- Valerie Holman ‘Promoting Original Prints: The Role of Gualtieri di San Lazzaro and XXe Siècle’, Print Quarterly, Volume XXXIII, No. 2 (June 2016), pp. 159–67
- Luca Pietro Nicoletti, Gualtieri di San Lazzaro: Scritti e incontri di un editore d’arte a Parigi, Macerata, Quodlibet, 2014
