= Gerhard Schmidt (art historian) =

Austrian art historian (1924–2010)

Gerhard Schmidt

Gerhard Schmidt (11 May 1924 - 3 April 2010) was professor of the history of art at the University of Vienna. He was Slade Professor of Fine Art at the University of Cambridge 1981–82.

Schmidt was the son of a physician. After work and military service as well as American war imprisonment, he began studying medicine at the University of Vienna in 1946. In 1947 he moved to the fields of archeology and art history. In 1951 he graduated with a dissertation on French relief sculpture.

He habilitated in 1959 with the work "Die Armenbibeln des XIV. Jahrhunderts". In 1968, he was appointed full professor of the University of Vienna from which he retired in 1992. From 1973 he was a member of the philosophical-historical class of the Austrian Academy of Sciences and was elected a full member in 1984.

Schmidt was buried at the Heiligenstadt cemetery in Vienna.

== Selected publications ==
- Neue Malerei in Osterreich. 1956
- Die Armenbibeln des XIV. Jahrhunderts. 1959
- Die Wiener Biblia pauperum. 1962
- Die Malerschule von St. Florian. 1962
- Krumauer Bildercodex. 1967
- Stelzen und Pylonen. 1989
- Gotische Bildwerke und ihre Meister. 1991
