= Walter S. Gibson =

American art historian (1932–2018)

Walter Samuel Gibson (1932 – 18 November 2018) was an American art historian and university professor whose studies focused primarily on the artists Pieter Bruegel the Elder and Hieronymus Bosch.

== Life ==
Gibson was born in Columbus, Ohio. Following military service in the United States Army during the Korean War, Gibson graduated cum laude with his BFA from Ohio State University in 1957 and then studied at Harvard University. After Gibson obtained his master of arts in 1960, he was awarded a Fulbright Scholarship for doctoral research. Gibson's Ph.D was completed in 1969. He worked as a professor at Case Western Reserve University from 1966 to 1998. He led the Department of Art History and Art at Case Western from 1971 to 1979, and assumed the Andrew W. Mellon Professorship in the Humanities in 1978, the same year he received the Guggenheim Fellowship. In retirement, Gibson was named the Clark Visiting Professor of Art History at Williams College.

Gibson studied art from the Northern Renaissance period, particularly focusing on the artists Hieronymus Bosch and Pieter Bruegel. The archive of his work was acquired by the Rubenianum, a research institution and archive for Flemish art, in 2018.

== Select publications ==
- The Paintings of Cornelis Engebrechtsz. Harvard, 1969.
- Bruegel. New York: Oxford University Press, 1977
- Hieronymus Bosch: An Annotated Bibliography. Boston : G. K. Hall, 1983
- Mirror of the Earth: The World Landscape in Sixteenth-century Flemish Painting. Princeton: Princeton University Press, 1989
- Bruegel and Netherlandish Landscape Painting from the National Gallery Prague. Tokyo: National Museum of Western Art, 1990
- Pleasant Places: The Rustic Landscape from Bruegel to Ruisdael. Berkeley: University of California Press, 2000
- Pieter Bruegel and the Art of Laughter. Berkeley: University of California Press, 2006.
