= Georgina Masson =

British author and photographer

Georgina Masson (1912–1980) was a British author and photographer. Born Marion Johnson, and known as Babs to her friends, Georgina Masson is her literary pseudonym.

Johnson was born in Rawalpindi, India, on 23 March 1912. She was the daughter of an officer stationed in India at the time. She died in 1980 in London.

== Early life ==
Details of Masson's early life are somewhat sketchy though it is known that she caught the travelling bug early spending time in Europe, Asia and Africa. During the Second World War she worked at the Foreign Office in London and at the Ministry of Information. Her work in the Foreign Office took her to Italy where she continued to live until 1978.

== Legacy ==
Georgina Masson was a photographer and an architectural historian whose interests took in Ancient Rome through to the medieval period in Sicily. Her writings are extensive and her works include studies of gardens and villas and biographies as well as Roman Architecture and later Italian Architecture.

Her work as a photographer, which went hand in hand with her architectural interests, was brought to the fore following her death. Around 5,000 negatives were bequeathed by her to American Academy in Rome. Although the majority of her images are of architecture and gardens and the city of Rome, the collection also includes observations of everyday life. A selection of her photographic works featured in an exhibition 'Author and Eye' in Rome in April 2003 at the American Academy. The catalogue of the exhibition was entitled 'Georgina Masson 1912-1980'.

Photographs attributed to Georgina Masson can also be found in the Conway Library at the Courtauld Institute of Art in London. This collection focuses on Ecclesiastical and Secular Architecture through different historical periods and across continents.

== Bibliography ==
A selection of her published works includes:

- Frederick II of Hohenstaufen. A Life. (Secker & Warburg, London 1957)
- Italian Villas and Palaces, 'The World of Art Library' series. (Thames & Hudson, London 1959)
- Italian Gardens, 'The World of Art Library' series. (Thames & Hudson, London 1961)
- The Companion Guide to Rome. (Collins, London 1965)
- Queen Christina. (Secker Warburg, London 1968)
- Courtesans of the Italian Renaissance. (Secker Warburg, London 1975)
