= Bruce Wands =

American academic and author (1949–2022)

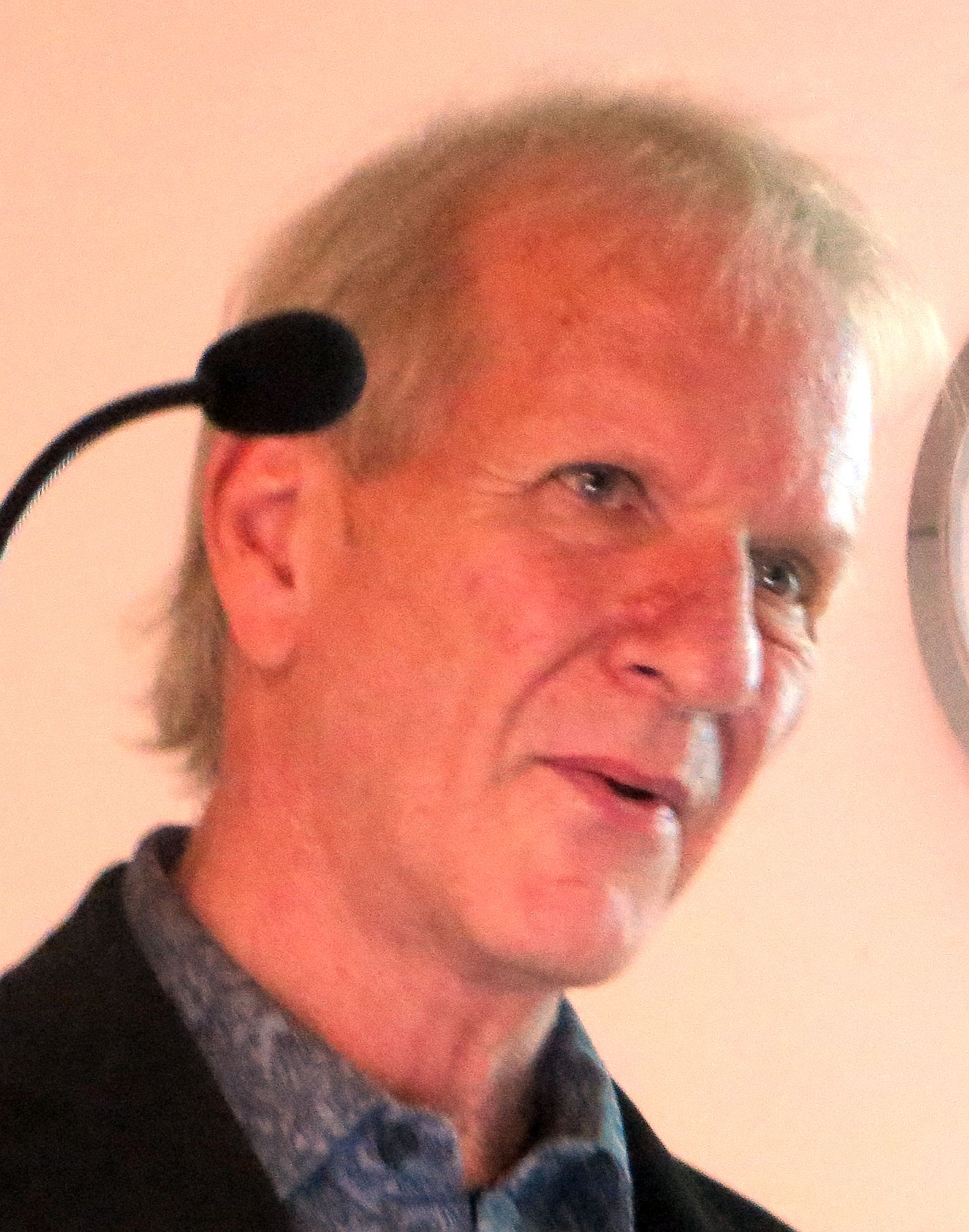
- Bruce Wands speaking at the EVA London conference
- Born: October 22, 1949; Montclair, New Jersey, United States
- Died: July 6, 2022 (aged 72); Montclair, New Jersey, United States
- Occupations: Academic and author
- Years active: 1984–2017
- Known for: New York Digital Salon; School of Visual Arts BFA and MFA programs
- Title: Chair
- Awards: Time Out New York "99 People to Watch in 1999"

Academic background
- Education: Lafayette College (BA, 1971); Syracuse University (MS, 1976)

Academic work
- Discipline: Art
- Sub-discipline: Digital art
- Institutions: School of Visual Arts (New York)
- Main interests: Digital art
- Notable works: Digital Creativity (2001); Art of the Digital Age (2006)

Bruce E. Wands (October 22, 1949 – July 6, 2022) was an American teacher, author, artist, and musician, with a specific interest in digital art. As well as art and music, he was interested in creativity in general. Specifically, he was a pioneer of computer graphics. He founded the BFA Computer Art Department at the School of Visual Arts in New York City and directed the New York Digital Salon. Time Out New York named Wands as one of the "99 People to Watch in 1999".

Born in Montclair, New Jersey, and raised in nearby Verona, as the youngest of three children, Wands graduated from Verona High School in 1967. In 1971, he received a BA degree from Lafayette College and in 1976 he was awarded a Master of Science degree by Syracuse University. He was director of Computer Education at the School of Visual Arts in New York and then founded the BFA Computer Art program at the School, which he led from 1994 until 1998. He was later Chair of the MFA Computer Arts program during 1998–2016, and Chair Emeritus from 2017 until 2022.

Wands was curator (1993–1995) and director (1998–2017) of the New York Digital Salon (NYDS). He authored two books, Digital Creativity: Techniques for Digital Media and the Internet (John Wiley & Sons, 2001) and Art of the Digital Age (Thames & Hudson, 2006), together with many articles on digital art. He lectured, performed, and exhibited his creative output around the United States and also internationally. In 1992, he was the first musician to perform live using an ISDN connection on the Internet.

Wands died in Montclair, New Jersey in July 2022. The EVA London 2023 conference was dedicated to his memory, a year later.
