= Michael J. Lewis (architecture critic) =

American art and architecture scholar

Michael J. Lewis is an American art historian and architectural critic. He is the Faison-Pierson-Stoddard Professor of Art History at Williams College and the architectural critic for The Wall Street Journal.

== Works ==
- City of Refuge. Separatists and Utopian Town Planning . Princeton University Press, Princeton 2016, ISBN 978-0-691-17181-4.
- American Art and Architecture. Thames & Hudson, London 2006.
- Gothic revival. Thames and Hudson, London 2002, ISBN 0-500-20359-8.
- Frank Furness. Architecture and the Violent Mind. WW Norton, New York 2001, ISBN 0-393-73063-8.
- Monument to Philanthropy: The Design and Building of Girard College, 1832-1848 (with Bruce Laverty and Michelle Taillon Taylor). Girard College, Philadelphia 1998.
- Drawn from the Source: The Travel Drawings of Louis I. Kahn, catalog of an exhibition at the Williams College Museum of Art (with Eugene J. Johnson). MIT Press, Cambridge, Mass. 1996.
- La Geometry de la Fortification: Traites et Manuels, 1500-1800 / The Geometry of Defense, Catalog of an exhibition at the Canadian Center for Architecture. Canadian Center for Architecture, Montreal 1992.
- Frank Furness, The Complete Works. (together with George E. Thomas and Jeffrey A. Cohen). Princeton Architectural Press, New York 1991/1996.
- The Politics of the German Gothic Revival. Architectural History Foundation and MIT Press, New York 1993, ISBN 0-262-12177-8.
