= John Beckwith (curator) =

English museum curator and art historian

John Gordon Beckwith, FBA, FSA (2 December 1918 – 20 February 1991) was an English museum curator and art historian.

Born on 2 December 1918, Beckwith attended Ampleforth College before serving in the Second World War; he was badly injured during the Normandy landings. After the war, he studied modern history at Exeter College, Oxford.

In 1948, Beckworth was appointed an assistant keeper in the Department of Textiles at the Victoria and Albert Museum. He became a specialist in medieval and Byzantine textiles. In 1955, he was transferred to the Department of Architecture and Sculpture and studied medieval ivory carvings. He was promoted to be the department's Deputy Keeper in 1958. That year, he helped to organise an important exhibition of Byzantine art in London and Edinburgh. He wrote The Andrews Diptych (1958), Caskets from Cordoba (1960), The Art of Constantinople (1961), Early Medieval Art (1964), Early Christian and Byzantine Art (1970) and Ivory Carvings in Early Medieval England (1972). In 1974, he was appointed Keeper of the Department of Architecture and Sculpture, serving until 1979; he was also the Slade Professor of Fine Art at the University of Oxford from 1978 to 1979.

Beckwith was elected a fellow of the Society of Antiquaries of London in 1968 and a fellow of the British Academy in 1974. He died on 20 February 1991.
