= James H. Rubin =

American art historian and academic

James H. Rubin

James Henry Rubin is an American art historian and a professor of history at Stony Brook University in Stony Brook, New York.

== Early life and education ==
James Rubin was born on May 4, 1944. He was educated at Phillips Andover, Yale (B.A.), Harvard (PhD) and the Institut d'Art et d'Archéologie of the Sorbonne in Paris (license-ès-lettres).

== Career ==
Prior to Stony Brook, he taught at Harvard University, Boston University and Princeton University. At Stony Brook, he was department chair for fifteen years. He also taught part-time for many years at The Cooper Union, New York City.

He has published over sixty articles and essays on subjects ranging from the eighteenth century to the present. He is the author of 13 books: Eighteenth Century French Life Drawing (1977), Realism and Social Vision in Courbet and Proudhon (1981), Eugène Delcaroix's 'Dantebarke' (1987), Manet's Silence and the Poetics of Bouquets (1994), Courbet (1997), Impressionism (1999), Nadar (2001), Impressionist Cats and Dogs: Pets in the Painting of Modern Life (2003), Impressionism and the Modern Landscape: Productivity, Technology and Urbanization from Manet to Van Gogh (2008), Manet: Initial M, hand and eye (2010, French edition 2011); Realism and Music: Courbet, Berlioz, Wagner and Relations between the Arts in Nineteenth-Century France (2012, e-book); and How to Read Impressionism: Ways of Looking (2013); and an edited volume, Rival Sisters: Art and Music at the Birth of Modernism, 1815-1915 (2014). His books have been translated into several languages including, French, Greek, Korean, Japanese, and Dutch.

He has served on the International Committee of the College Art Association (CAA) and represented the CAA at the United Nations. He is a member and Vice President of the Société Paul Cézanne, based in Aix-en-Provence, France. At Stony Brook, he is an affiliate of the Department of European Languages, the Department of Cultural Studies and Critical Analysis, and the Department of Philosophy. When he teaches graduate seminars at Stony Brook's annex campus in Manhattan, they are cross-listed with Philosophy as part of Stony Brook’s Art and Philosophy program. In 2008, he was a Research Visiting Professor at the Université de Paris I, Institut national d'histoire de l'art in Paris. He is the winner of an American Council of Learned Societies Travel Grant and as of 2016 was on leave as a National Endowment for the Humanities Public Scholar.

== Personal life ==
He is a dual French-U.S. citizen, speaking fluent French and English. He travels frequently, lectures and collaborates internationally, while living in New York City and in Mittelbergheim, Alsace. His son is the filmmaker Henry-Alex Rubin.
