= Wolf-Dieter Dube =

German art historian

Wolf-Dieter Dube (13 July 1934 – 9 September 2015) was a German art historian.

== Life and career ==
Born in Schwerin, Dube studied art history, and received his doctorate from the University of Göttingen in 1963. From 1969 on he was director of the Pinakothek der Moderne in Munich, from 1976 on also deputy director general of the Bavarian State Painting Collections. From 1983 to 1999 he was General Director of the Staatliche Museen zu Berlin/Prussian Cultural Heritage Foundation.

After 1990, together with Günter Schade, he led the reunification of those collections of the National Museums that had been separated by the German division. He made a historic contribution to the Berlin and at the same time to the German museum landscape. He gave the decisive impulse for the construction of the Gemäldegalerie am Kulturforum, and the opening of the Hamburger Bahnhof as a museum for contemporary art is also associated with his name. Dube was author of numerous specialist publications.

Dube died in Berlin at the age of 81.

== Honours ==
- 1986: Order of Merit of the Italian Republic
- 1989: Order of Merit of the Federal Republic of Germany 1st class
- 1993: Commander of the Royal Norwegian Order of Merit
- 1999: Ernst Ludwig Kirchner Prize
- 1999: Order of Merit of Berlin

== Publications (selection) ==
- Süddeutsche Bronzemörser. Dissertation Universität Göttingen 1963, DNB-IDN 481907157.
- with Annemarie Dube: Ernst Ludwig Kirchner. Das graphische Werk. 2 volumes, Prestel, Munich 1967, 2nd edition 1980, 3rd edition 1991, ISBN 3-7913-0479-8 (Münchner Forschungen zur Kunstgeschichte).
- Les expressionnistes.
