= Sandy Hook Promise =

Gun violence prevention organization

- Formation: 2013; 13 years ago
- Founded: 2013
- Founder: Nicole Hockley; Mark Barden
- Type: 501(c)(3) 501(c)(4)
- Location: 13 Church Hill Road Newtown, Connecticut 06470, United States
- Region served: United States
- Members: 9,100,000
- Key people: Bill Sherlach
- Revenue: $14,923,966
- Employees: 118
- Volunteers: 16,000
- Website: www.sandyhookpromise.org

Sandy Hook Promise (SHP) is an American 501(c)(3) nonprofit organization which was established in 2013 in the aftermath of the Sandy Hook Elementary School shooting, to create gun violence prevention programs. The main mission of Sandy Hook Promise is to educate and empower youth and adults to prevent violence in schools, homes and communities.

== History ==
In January 2013, one month after the shooting at Sandy Hook Elementary School, family members of victims launched Sandy Hook Promise at a news conference in Newtown, Connecticut. The founding members of SHP were Nicole Hockley, Mark Barden, Bill Sherlach, and Tim Makris, who were all directly affected by the shooting. Hockley and Barden both lost their sons, Dylan and Daniel, respectively, in the shooting, and Sherlach's wife, Mary, was also killed. Makris had a child who went to the school at the time of the shooting, but was not harmed.

== Organization ==
SHP is governed by the Board of Directors which currently consists of 14 members. There are over 100 employees that work nationwide to advocate for the organization (2023). There is a Board of Advisors, Youth

Advisory Board (YAB) and a School Advisory Committee. Additionally there are two councils; the Leadership Council has active philanthropists which are actively giving and providing for the organization. The Young Leaders Council was created to fundraise and create awareness.

== Program overview ==
According to SHP's website they advocate with the following motto:

Educate and empower youth and adults to prevent violence in schools, homes, and communities

— Sandy Hook Promise (SHP)

The organization provides programs to teach the warning signs of violence and how to get help to intervene from an adult or anonymous reporting system. The group’s policy arm, Sandy Hook Promise Action Fund, advocates for bipartisan gun safety, mental health and violence prevention. Further it has been reviewed by the charity assessment organization Charity Navigator and has received a 4-star rating. There are several programs offered by the organization;

=== School safety ===
The 501c3 Foundation of Sandy Hook Promise provides violence prevention and school safety programs to schools and youth-serving organizations in the United States. These include Say Something and an accompanying anonymous reporting system.

=== Social inclusion ===
Sandy Hook Promise provides an anti-bullying and social inclusion program to schools and youth-serving organizations in the United States. The program is entitled Start With Hello.

=== Youth leadership development ===
Sandy Hook Promise provides support for school culture change and youth leadership development to schools and youth-serving organization in the United States. With a model similar to Students Against Drunk Driving, SAVE Promise Clubs are student-led organizations within elementary, middle, and high schools focused on fostering social inclusion and preventing violence.

=== Research ===
Sandy Hook Promise partners with the University of Michigan to continually evaluate the “Know the Signs” programs, Start With Hello and Say Something, to maximize effectiveness in achieving cultural change that will have a long-term impact on school safety and student well-being. The programs are backed by comprehensive research by the Department of Homeland Security / Secret Service studies on mass shootings and targeted school violence.

== Issues ==
=== Background checks on gun sales ===
The Sandy Hook Promise Action Fund advocates for the expansion of background checks before a firearm purchase to help identify people who are prohibited by federal law from owning guns. Since the federal background check requirement was enacted in 1994, more than 3 million illegal gun sales have been stopped by a background check.

=== Magazine-capacity limits ===
The Sandy Hook Promise Action Fund advocates for limits on high-capacity magazines, which allow firearms to be discharged repeatedly without reloading.

=== Temporary transfer of firearms ===
The Sandy Hook Promise Action Fund advocates for policies that enable temporary transfer of firearms. Also known as extreme risk protection orders or red flag laws, they empower family members and law enforcement to prevent gun violence and gun-related suicides by petitioning a court to temporarily separate an at-risk individual from firearms.

=== Secure storage of firearms ===
The Sandy Hook Promise Action Fund advocates for the safe and secure storage of firearms. According to a study conducted by researchers from Harvard, Columbia and Northeastern universities, an estimated 4.6 million children in the United States live in a home in which at least one firearm was stored both loaded and unlocked.

== See also ==
- Brady Campaign
- Everytown for Gun Safety
- Giffords Law Center
- March for Our Lives
- Back-To-School Essentials
