= Patrick Waldberg =

American journalist

Patrick Waldberg (1913-1985) was a Franco-American art critic known for his profiles of Surrealist artists.

== Biography ==
Born in Santa Monica, California, Waldberg moved to Paris as a child with his family. In 1932, and while still a student (age 19), he joined Boris Souvarine's Democratic Communist Circle. There he met Georges Bataille and his friends Michel Leiris and André Masson, and was initiated by them into a wild night life. Waldberg would chronicle those years in his novel La Clé de cendre (The key made of ashes), published posthumously in 1999.

1937 saw him back in California to take care of "family matters". However, a letter from Georges Bataille reached him there, urging him to return to Paris in order to take part in a Nietzschean secret society Bataille was then forming, called Acéphale ("headless"). Waldberg heeded the call in September 1938, and he says this permanently changed his life. From 1938 to 1940 Waldberg would serve as the secretary of Bataille's "official" group, the College of Sacred Sociology.

In the winter of 1939, Waldberg was invited by Georges Bataille to move in with him to his house in Saint-Germain-en-Laye, a suburb of Paris.

In the fall of that year he joined the French army to help repel the German invasion. In March 1940, Isabelle Farner gave birth to his son Michel Waldberg. After the French defeat Patrick and Isabelle fled to the USA where they took up residence in New York. In 1941 Patrick became a founder of the "Voice of America" radio broadcasts. It seems it was he who then attracted André Breton to also become an announcer on Voice of America.In 1942 Waldberg quit Voice of America to join the US army intelligence service, taking part in the African campaign and then the Normandy invasion. During this time Isabelle stayed in New York.

In 1959 he left Paris to move to the French village of Seillans, where his second wife Line Jubelin was from. Max Ernst and his own second wife Dorothea Tanning joined him there. Their houses are now a Max Ernst museum and a Maison Waldberg museum. In 1964 Waldberg organized a major Surrealist exhibit at Gallerie Charpentier. André Breton took umbrage at this however, due to Waldberg's defection in 1951. Breton and his group printed a declaration condemning the show, ""Face aux liquidateurs", and then a subsequent pamphlet, "Cramponnez-vous à la table (Petite Suite surréaliste à l'affaire du Bazar Charpentier)".
