= John Steer (art historian) =

John Steer (1928 – 20 February 2012) was Professor of the History of Art at Birkbeck College, University of London, from 1979 to his retirement in 1984. Subsequently, he was emeritus professor of the history of art, University of London. He was a specialist in Venetian art.

Steer was the founder of the departments of art history at both Bristol and then St Andrews universities.

Steer received an Honorary Doctorate from Heriot-Watt University in 1991.

== Selected publications ==
- A concise history of Venetian painting. London: Thames and Hudson, 1970.
- Alvise Vivarini: His art and influence. Cambridge: Cambridge University Press, 1982. ISBN 0521233631
- Atlas of western art history: Artists, sites and movements from ancient Greece to the modern age. New York: Facts on File, c. 1994. ISBN 081602457X
