= William Vaughan (art historian) =

British art historian

William Vaughan is a British art historian and has been emeritus professor of history of art at Birkbeck College, University of London since 2003.

He is also a printmaker, and regularly exhibits in London and Bristol under the name Will Vaughan. He is Chair of the Bruton Art Society.

== Selected publications ==
- Caspar David Friedrich 1774–1840: Romantic landscape painting in Dresden: (catalogue of an exhibition held at the Tate Gallery London 6 September – 16 October 1972), Tate Gallery, London, 1972. ISBN 0900874368
- Romantic Art, Thames & Hudson, London, 1978. ISBN 0500181608
- German Romanticism and English Art, Yale, 1979. ISBN 0300021941
- Art and the natural world in nineteenth-century Britain: Three essays (The Franklin D. Murphy lectures), Spencer Museum of Art, University of Kansas, 1990. ISBN 0913689335
- German Romantic Painting, Yale 1994. ISBN 0300060475
- Romanticism and Art, Thames & Hudson, London, 1994. ISBN 0500202753
- William Blake, Tate Publishing, London, 1999. ISBN 1854372815
- British Painting: The Golden Age: From Hogarth to Turner. Thames & Hudson, London, 1999. ISBN 0500203199
- Gainsborough, Thames & Hudson, London, 2002. ISBN 050020358X
- John Constable, Tate Publishing, London, 2002. ISBN 1854374346
- Friedrich, Phaidon, London, 2004. ISBN 0714840602
- Samuel Palmer: 1805–1881, Vision and Landscape, Lund Humphries, 2005. ISBN 0853319324 (Editor)
- Samuel Palmer: Shadows on the Wall, Yale University Press, 2015. ISBN 0300209851
