= List of honorary members of the Accademia delle Arti del Disegno of Florence =

In June 2013, the honorary members of the Accademia delle Arti del Disegno of Florence were:

- Hussah Al-Sabah
- Aldo Angioi
- Pier Fausto Bagatti Valsecchi
- Pier Luigi Ballini
- Roberta Bartoli
- Sandro Bellesi
- Mario Bencivenni
- Paola Benigni
- Sergio Bertelli
- Christoph Bertsch
- Françoise Bissarra-Fréreau
- Vincenzo Bogliaccino
- Nana-Kow Bondzie
- Maurizio Bossi
- Isak Mathys Botha
- Andrea Branzi
- Aldo Buoncristiano
- François Burchardt
- Daniel Buren
- Susanna Buricchi
- Sandra Buyet
- Remo Buti
- Franco Camarlinghi
- Luigi Cappugi
- Giovanni Carbonara
- Fernando Caruncho
- Stefano Casciu
- Pier Angiolo Cetica
- Miles E. Chappell
- Andrea Chiti Batelli
- Marco Ciatti
- Enrico Colle
- Giuseppe Luigi Coluccia
- Michel Conan
- Simonella Condemi
- Giovanni Conti
- Roberto Contini
- Mario Cusmano
- Charles Davis
- Carlo Del Bravo
- Andrea Del Guercio
- Romano Del Nord
- Stefano De Rosa
- Hugues De Varine Bohan
- Elio Di Franco
- Luftu Dogan
- Georges Dontas
- Francesco D'Ostilio
- Elisabeth von Driander Treviranus
- Francesco Durante
- Marco Fagioli
- Marzia Faietti
- Ramon Falcon
- Italo Faldi
- Franca Falletti di Villafalletto
- Luigi Fatichi
- Giorgio Fiorenza
- Anna Forlani Tempesti
- Andrea Claudio Galluzzo
- Ali Gengeli
- Gabriella Gentilini
- Giancarlo Gentilini
- Alessandro Gioli
- Anna Maria Giusti
- Giuliano Gori
- Gianfranco Grimaldi
- Carlo Guaita
- René Maurice Gueye
- Alessandro Guidotti
- Margaret Haines
- Herman Hertzberger
- Michael Hirst
- Madaleine Hours
- Elisabetta Insabato
- Jasper Johns
- Pierre Lalive D'Épinay
- Carlo Lapucci
- Rita Levi Montalcini
- Gina Lollobrigida
- Tomislav Maksimovic
- Duccio Mannucci
- Giampiero Maracchi
- Carlo Marchiori
- Paolo Marconi
- Corrado Marsan
- Lara Vinca Masini
- Mario Matteucci
- Silvia Meloni Trkulja
- Bartolomeo Migone
- Maria Augusta Morelli Timpanaro
- Gabriele Morolli
- Rosanna Morozzi
- Alessandro Nova
- Hendrik van Os
- Piero Pacini
- Claude François Parent
- Francesca Petrucci
- Renzo Piano
- Giovanni Pieraccini
- Sandra Pinto
- Silvano Piovanelli
- Pina Ragionieri
- Tullia Romagnoli Carettoni
- Franca Roselli
- Pierre Rosenberg
- Niccolò Rosselli Del Turco
- Franco Scaramuzzi
- Pierre Schneider
- Erkinger Schwarzenberg
- Magnolia Scudieri
- Ludovica Sebregondi
- Max Seidel
- Salvatore Settis
- Maria Sframeli
- Giorgio Simoncini
- Francesco Sisinni
- Edoardo Speranza
- Valdo Spini
- Elena Staccioli
- Cristos Stremmenos
- Franck Sznura
- Angelo Tartuferi
- Serguei Tikhvinsky
- Luigi Ulivieri
- Mario Ursino
- Maria Grazia Vaccari
- Domenico Valentino
- Cesare Vasoli
- Timothy Verdon
- Edoardo Vesentini
- Robert Venturi
- Rosario Vernuccio
- Alessandro Vezzosi
- Adolfo Vitta
- Louis Waldman
- Giorgio Weber
- Detlef Weis
- Gerard Wolf

== Past members ==
Past honorary members include:

- Giulio Andreotti
