= DeLorenzo =

DeLorenzo or De Lorenzo or de Lorenzo is an Italian surname. It may refer to:

- Bart DeLorenzo (born 1965), American theater director
- Dana DeLorenzo (born 1983), American actress
- Enrico de Lorenzo, Italian bobsleigher who competed during the 1960s
- Francesco De Lorenzo (born 1938), Italian doctor and politician
- Giovanni de Lorenzo Larciani (1484-1527), Italian painter
- Italo de Lorenzo, Italian bobsleigher who competed in the mid-1960s
- Leonardo De Lorenzo (1875–1962), Italian musician
- Michael DeLorenzo (born 1959), American actor
- Tista De Lorenzo (born 1934), Australian football player
- Victor DeLorenzo (born 1954), American musician

== See also ==
- De Lorenzo's Tomato Pies, a pizzeria in New Jersey
- Lorenzo (name)
