= Portrait of a Young Woman =

Portrait of a Young Woman may refer to:

- Portrait of a Young Woman (Vermeer), completed between 1666 and 1667 by Johannes Vermeer
- Portrait of a Young Woman (La Muta) by Raphael
- Portrait of a Young Woman (Botticelli, Frankfurt)
- Portrait of a Young Woman (Parmigianino)
- Portrait of a Young Woman (Raphael)
- Portrait of a Young Woman (Raphael, Strasbourg)
- Portrait of a Young Woman (Frans Hals; Hull)
- Portrait of a Young Woman (Rembrandt)
- Portrait of a Young Woman (Rosso Fiorentino)
- Portrait of a Young Woman (Rubens)
- Portrait of a Young Woman (van der Weyden)
- Portrait of a Young Woman (Pollaiolo), a 1470-1472 mixed-technique painting
- Portrait of a Young Woman (Rosso Fiorentino), a c.1510 oil on canvas painting

== See also ==
- The Portrait of a Lady (disambiguation)
- Portrait of a Woman (van der Weyden), completed between 1435–1440 by Rogier van der Weyden
- Portrait of a Young Girl (Christus), completed c. 1470 by Petrus Christus
- Portrait of Lavinia Vecellio, or Portrait of a Girl, completed c.1545 by Titian
