= Madonna of the Book (Pontormo) =

Painting by Pontormo

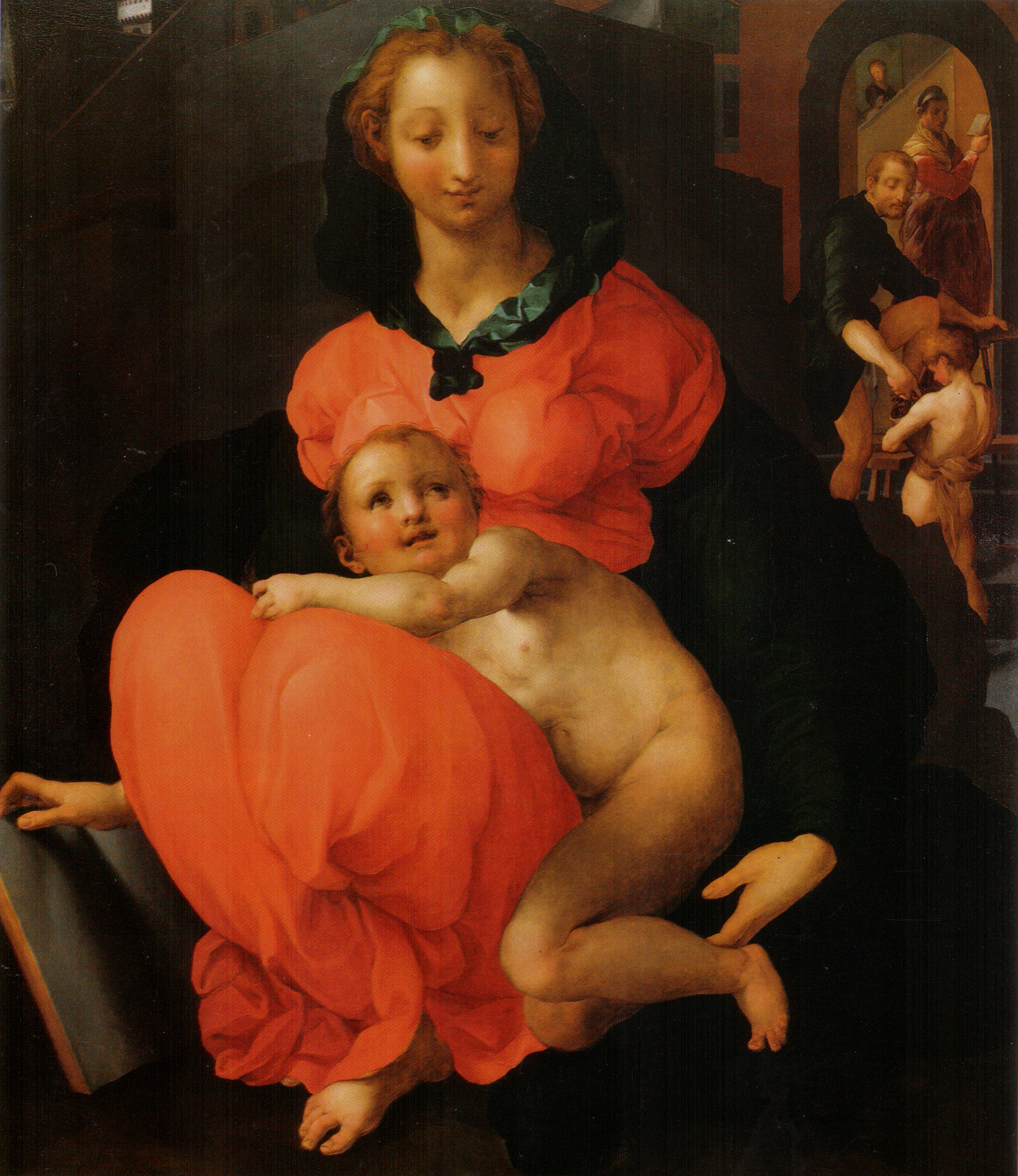
Madonna of the Book (c. 1540–1545) by Pontormo

Madonna of the Book (Italian - Madonna del Libro) is a c.1540–1545 oil on panel painting by Pontormo, heavily influenced by Michelangelo and now in a private collection. It may be the work described in Lives of the Artists as a "canvas of Our Lady" found among drawings, cartoons and terracotta models in the painter's home after his death and which was then given to Piero Salviati by the painter's heirs.

Several copies survive, the best of which may be the one recorded in Luciano Berti's private collection in 1993, whilst another owned by the Accademia dell'Arte del Disegno is in the Palazzo dell'Arte dei Beccai and a third is in the Uffizi. A fragment of a copy also survives in the Yale University Art Gallery.
