= Erling Skaug =

Norwegian art conservator (1938–2022)

Erling Sigvard Skaug (15 December 1938 – 7 March 2022) was a Norwegian art conservator.

He started his career at the National Gallery of Norway and also worked as a conservator at the Norsk Folkemuseum and the Oldsakssamlingen. In 1995 he took the dr.philos. degree and in 1997 he was hired as a professor of conservation at the University of Oslo. He retired in 2004, but was a guest scholar at the Harvard Center for Italian Renaissance Studies in 2008–09. He was a fellow of the Norwegian Academy of Science and Letters. In 2006, he was awarded the title "Cavaliere dell'Ordine della Stella d'Italia" by the Italian government, for his work to save Italian cultural heritage after the flood in Florence of 1966.

In 2018 he issued the polemic book Spillet om Nasjonalgalleriet. En politisk skandale, in which he criticized the process of discontinuing the National Gallery of Norway and moving it to the National Museum of Norway.

== 1966 Florence flood involvement ==
As a young conservator, Erling Skaug (1938–2022) participated in restoration work following the 1966 Florence flood, assisting efforts to restore paintings damaged by floodwaters from the Arno River. The experience influenced his later career in conservation and art historical research. Skaug subsequently worked at institutions including the National Gallery of Norway and later became professor of conservation at the University of Oslo. His contributions to the preservation of Italian cultural heritage after the flood were recognised by the Italian government, which awarded him the title Cavaliere dell’Ordine della Stella d’Italia in 2006.
