= Michael Hirst =

Michael Hirst may refer to:

- Michael Hirst (politician) (born 1946), former Scottish Conservative and Unionist Party politician
- Michael Hirst (writer) (born 1952), screenwriter of Elizabeth (1998) and creator of The Tudors (2007–2010)
- Michael Hirst (art historian) (1933–2017), art historian, monographer of Sebastiano del Piombo

== See also ==
- Michael Hurst (disambiguation)
