= Howard Burns =

British art historian (1939–2025)

- Born: June 10, 1939; Aberdeen, Scotland, United Kingdom
- Died: February 18, 2025 (aged 85); Lugano, Switzerland
- Known for: Scholarship on Andrea Palladio
- Title: Professor emeritus

Academic background
- Education: King's College, Cambridge; Courtauld Institute of Art
- Doctoral advisor: Peter Murray

Howard Burns (10 June 1939, Aberdeen – 18 February 2025, Lugano) was a British architectural historian. He was professor emeritus of architectural history at the Scuola Normale Superiore in Pisa, and also lectured at the Courtauld Institute of Art and was Slade Professor of Fine Art at the University of Cambridge (1977–78). He was a specialist in the architecture of Andrea Palladio and was a member of the Accademia Olimpica and the Accademia di San Luca.

== Life and career ==
=== Background ===
Burns was born in 1939 in Aberdeen, Scotland. He attended Westminster School in London and moved on to study history at King's College, Cambridge, where he was awarded a B.A. At Cambridge he co-edited Delta magazine with Simon Gray, the now famous playwright. Two influences during Burns's undergraduate years were the lecturer John Saltmarsh, whose specialism was in medieval economic and social history, and the scholar, Robert Ralph Bolgar, author of The Classical Heritage.

Burns focused on Renaissance architects and their study of the antique for his postgraduate studies at the Courtauld Institute of Art, London. He was supervised by Peter Murray who, at the time, was Librarian at the Conway Library.

Burns died in February 2025, at the age of 86.

=== Academic life ===
By the late 1960s, Burns was teaching History of art at Cambridge University using his own colour images of Italian architecture in his lectures. Anthony Blunt, Director of the Courtauld Institute, came to hear of Burns's talent and encouraged him to teach at the Courtauld. By 1969 he was a lecturer there and this brought him into contact with a number of eminent art historians. such as John Shearman, Michael Hirst and Jennifer Fletcher. In 1986 Burns moved to a professorship at Harvard University in the Graduate School of Design. Italy, long his passion, became Burns's next destination taking a professorial position at the University of Ferrara in 1994. A year later he went over to the IUAV University of Venice. In 1993 Burns was appointed "Presidente of the Consiglio Scientifico of CISAAP, the Palladio Centre in Vicenza. Burns's last post was to a chair in architectural history at the Scuola Normale Superiore di Pisa.

He gave a lecture entitled "Unforced Elegance" held at the Art History Institute, Florence, on 25 November 2019 and was due to appear at the 33rd International Seminar on the History of Architecture, Naples and the Renaissance, at CISAAP, Andrea Palladio, Vicenza, between 18 and 20 May 2020. A short video clip of Burns discussing Palladio's relevance today gives some insight into Burns's expertise on the great architect.

=== Legacy ===
Burns had another connection to the Conway Library at the Courtauld Institute, London. As part of a wider project, Courtauld Connects, the library's collection of over a million photographic prints, glass and film negatives are currently being digitised. Photographs attributed to Burns are to be found among them.

== Curated exhibitions ==
- Palladio, London, 1975.
- Raphael, Rome, 1984.
- Giulio Romano, Mantua, 1989.
- Francesco di Giorgio, Siena, 1993.
- Palladio, Vicenza, London (Royal Academy), Barcelona and Madrid, 2008/09. (with Guido Beltramini)

== Selected publications ==
- Andrea Palladio 1508–1580: The portico and the farmyard. Arts Council of Great Britain, 1975. ISBN 072870062X
- Palladio and Northern Europe: Books, travellers, architects. Skira Editore, 1999. (With Guido Beltramini) ISBN 8881185245
- Palladio. Royal Academy of Arts, London, 2009. (With Guido Beltramini) ISBN 978-1905711246
- La villa italiana del Rinascimento. Forme e funzioni delle residenze di campagna, dal castello alla villa palladiana. Colla Editore, 2012. ISBN 978-8889527672
