= Beltramini =

Beltramini is an Italian surname. Notable people with the surname include:

- Francesco Beltramini (1522–1575), Italian Roman Catholic Bishop of Terracina, Priverno e Sezze (1564–1575) and Apostolic Nuncio to France
- Guido Beltramini (born 1961), Italian architectural historian, museum director and curator
- Jean-François Beltramini (1948–2014), French footballer
