= Alan Perreiah =

American philosopher and historian

- Born: 11 April 1937 (age 89); Los Angeles, California, U.S.

Education
- Education: Marquette University; Indiana University

Philosophical work
- Era: 20th and 21st century
- Region: Western philosophy
- Institutions: University of Kentucky
- Main interests: Medieval logic; history of logic; Renaissance humanism
- Notable works: Paul of Venice: A Bibliographical Guide; Paulus Venetus Logica Parva

Alan Perreiah (born 11 April 1937) is an American philosopher and historian of philosophy, with a special interest in the development of logic in Western Europe from the fifth to the fifteenth centuries. He is known for his research on the 15th-century Italian philosopher Paul of Venice. He is Professor Emeritus of Philosophy at the University of Kentucky.

== Early life and education ==
Perreiah was born in Los Angeles, California. He received an MA in philosophy from Marquette University in 1961. He received his PhD from Indiana University in 1967. His dissertation was titled Is There a Doctrine of Supposition in the Logica Magna?

== Career ==
Perreiah was a professor in the Department of Philosophy at the University of Kentucky, where he later served as Director of Undergraduate Studies. He is Professor Emeritus of Philosophy at the university.

During his academic career, Perreiah held several research fellowships. He was a member of the School of Historical Studies at the Institute for Advanced Study in Princeton from September 1973 to May 1974. From 1980 to 1981, he was an NEH Fellow at Villa I Tatti, the Harvard University Center for Italian Renaissance Studies in Florence, Italy. His project there concerned the life and writings of the Italian philosopher Paul of Venice. In 1994, he was a Mellon Fellow at the Vatican Film Library, where he conducted research on Paolo Veneto's Logica parva.

== Scholarship ==
Perreiah's research has focused on the development of logic in Western Europe from the fifth to the fifteenth centuries. He has emphasized logical form, truth theory, and holism in the interpretation of medieval logic, and has examined the transition between late Scholasticism and early Humanism. He has published extensively on Paul of Venice and medieval logic and semantics.

Perreiah's scholarship on Paul of Venice dates to at least 1967, when he published “A Biographical Introduction to Paul of Venice” in Augustiniana and completed his doctoral dissertation on the philosopher's Logica Magna. He later published Paul of Venice: A Bibliographical Guide (1986), which included a census of manuscripts, and edited Paulus Venetus: Logica Parva (2002), the first critical edition from the manuscripts with introduction and commentary.

== Personal life ==
Perreiah was married to the artist Grace Perreiah from 1958 until her death in 2026.

== Books ==
- Paul of Venice: Logica Magna, "Treatise on Suppositions," an edition, translation and introduction to the Tractatus de suppositionibus. New York: Franciscan Institute Publications, 1971.
- Paulus Venetus: Logica Parva, an English translation of the 1472 Edition with introductory essays and notes. Munich: Philosophia Verlag and the Catholic University of America Press, 1984.
- Paul of Venice: A Bibliographical Guide, including a census of the manuscripts. Bowling Green, Ohio: Philosophy Documentation Center, 1986.
- Paulus Venetus Logica Parva: First Critical Edition from the Manuscripts with Introduction and Commentary. Leiden; Boston: Brill, 2002.
- Renaissance Truths: Humanism, Scholasticism and the Search for the Perfect Language. Farnham: Ashgate, 2014.
