= Michael Hurst (disambiguation) =

Michael Hurst (born 1957) is a New Zealand actor.

Michael Hurst may also refer to:

- D. Michael Hurst Jr., Mississippi attorney
- Michael Hurst (director), Australian director on Between Two Worlds (TV series) (2020)
- Mike Hurst (politician) (born 1950), Canadian politician
- Mike Hurst (producer) (born 1942), English musician and record producer

== See also ==
- Michael Hirst (disambiguation)
