= Louise George Clubb =

Louise George Clubb is Professor Emerita of Italian Studies and Comparative Literature at the University of California, Berkeley.

She was the director of Villa I Tatti from 1985 to 1988.

In 1965, she was appointed a Guggenheim Fellow in Italian Literature.

== Books ==
- Giambattista della Porta, Dramatist (1965)
- Italian Plays (1500-1700) in the Folger Library: A Bibliography with Introduction (1968)
- Giambattista della Porta: Gli duoi fratelli rivali/The Two Rival Brothers (1980)
- Italian Drama in Shakespeare’s Time (1989)
- with Robert Black Romance and Aretine Humanism in Sienese Comedy, 1516: Pollastra’s “Parthenio” at the Studio di Siena (1993)
- Pollastra and the Origins of “Twelfth Night”: “Parthenio” (1516) (2010)
