= Alina Payne =

Historian of art and architecture

- Title: Alexander P. Misheff Professor of History of Art and Architecture; Paul E. Geier Director of Villa I Tatti

Academic background
- Education: McGill University; University of Toronto

Academic work
- Discipline: History of art and architecture
- Institutions: Oberlin College; University of Toronto; Harvard University

Alina Payne is a historian of art and architecture. She serves as Alexander P. Misheff Professor of History of Art and Architecture at Harvard University and the Paul E. Geier Director of Villa I Tatti, the Harvard University Center for Italian Renaissance Studies.

== Life ==
She graduated from McGill University, and University of Toronto. Her work focuses on architecture in the Renaissance, baroque and modern periods. Prior to joining Harvard she taught at Oberlin College and University of Toronto.

== Works ==
- The Architectural Treatise in the Italian Renaissance: Architectural Invention, Ornament and Literary Culture. Cambridge University Press. 14 April 2011. ISBN 978-0-521-17823-5. OCLC 646396965.
- From Ornament to Object. Genealogies of Architectural Modernism (Yale University Press, 2012) ISBN 9780300175332, OCLC 759174517
- The Telescope and the Compass. Teofilo Gallaccini and the Dialogue between Architecture and Science in the Age of Galileo (Leo Olschki, 2012) ISBN 9788822261229, OCLC 812195892
- Dalmatia and the Mediterranean : portable archaeology and the poetics of influence Leiden: Brill, [2014], ISBN 9789004263864, OCLC 903142150
