= Craig Hugh Smyth =

American art historian

- Born: July 28, 1915; New York, NY
- Died: December 22, 2006 (aged 91); Englewood, NJ
- Occupation: Renaissance art historian

Craig Hugh Smyth (1915–2006) was an American art historian who studied Renaissance art, with a special emphasis on the artist Bronzino. During World War II, he established the Allied Munich Central Collecting Point for Nazi-looted art, as part of the Monuments, Fine Arts, and Archives program.

== Biography ==
Smyth attended Princeton University, where he earned his BA (1938), MFA (1941), and PhD (1956), all in art history. He joined the naval reserve during World War II, and soon became part of the Monuments, Fine Arts, and Archives division. As an MFAA officer, in 1945 he established the Allied collecting point in Munich. After the war, he led the first academic program in conservation in the United States at the New York University Institute of Fine Arts (1950-1973). He was also the director of Harvard University's Center for Italian Renaissance Studies at Villa I Tatti in Florence (1973-1985). He was a member of both the American Academy of Arts and Sciences (1978) and the American Philosophical Society (1979).

== Works and publications ==
- Renaissance Studies in Honor of Craig Hugh Smyth. Florence: Giunti Barbèra, 1985
- Bronzino Studies (with a Book of) Illustrations. Princeton University, 1956 (dissertation)
- Mannerism and Maniera. Locust Valley, NY: J. J. Augustin, 1963
- Lukehart, Peter M. The Early Years of Art History in the United States: Notes and Essays on Departments, Teaching, and Scholars. Princeton, NJ: Dept. of Art and Archaeology, Princeton University, 1993 *Bronzino as Draughtsman; an Introduction. Locust Valley, NY: J. J. Augustin 1971
- Garfagnini, Gian Carlo. Florence and Milan: Comparisons and Relations: Acts of Two Conferences at Villa I Tatti in 1982-1984. 2 vols. Florence: La Nuova Italia editrice, 1989;
- Repatriation of Art from the Collecting Point in Munich after World War II. The Hague: Gary Schwartz/SDU, 1988;
- Millon, Henry A. Michelangelo architetto: la facciata di San Lorenzo e la cupola di San Pietro. Milan: Olivetti, 1988, (English: Michelangelo Architect: the Facade of San Lorenzo and the Drum and Dome of St. Peter's. Milan: Olivetti, 1988)
