= Giuliano Vangi =

Italian sculptor (1931–2024)

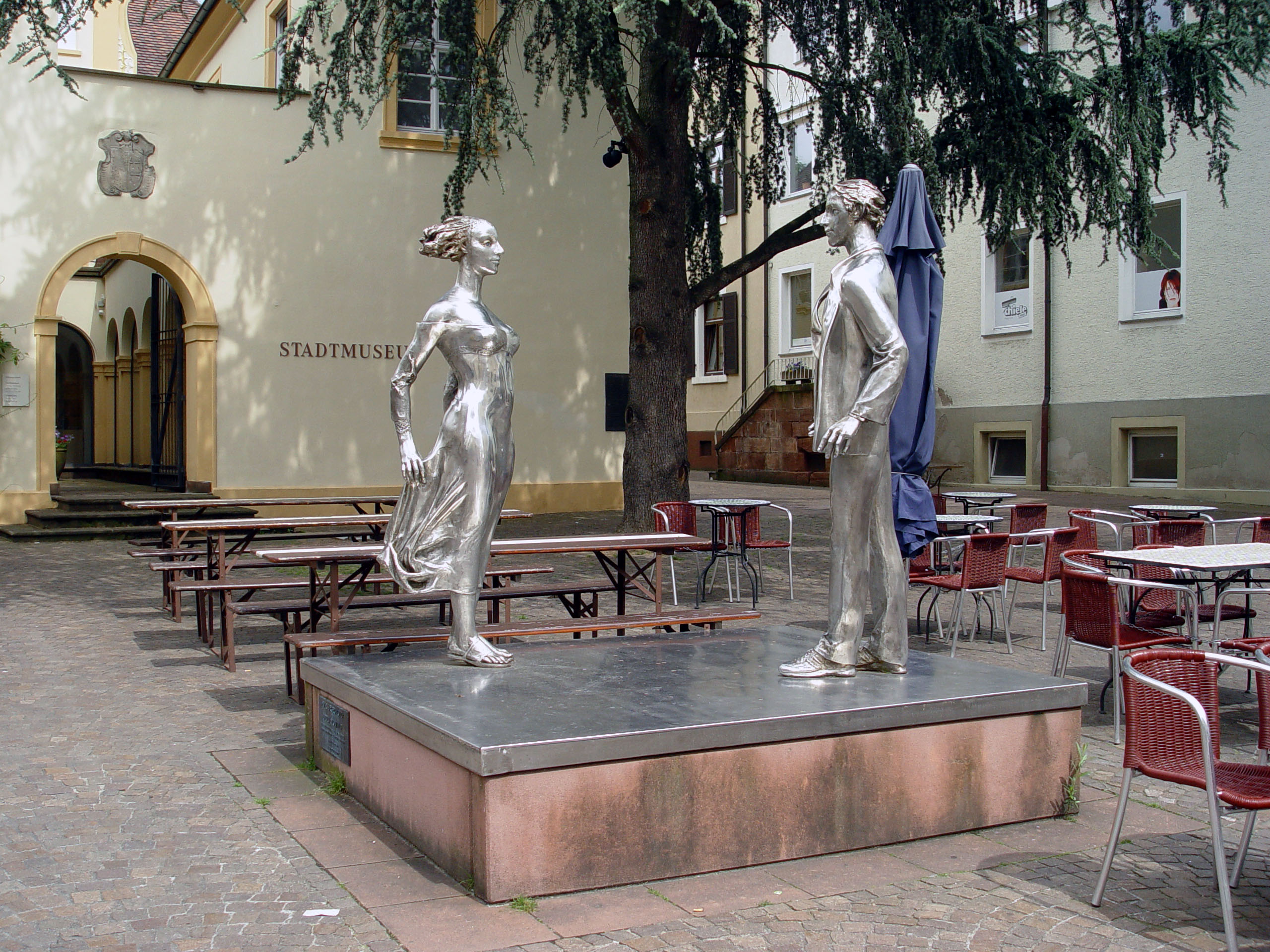
Vangi's sculpture "The meeting" in Rastatt

Giuliano Vangi (13 March 1931 – 26 March 2024) was an Italian sculptor. He received the Praemium Imperiale in the sculpture category in 2002.

== Life and career ==
Vangi was born in Barberino di Mugello and studied in the Istituto d'Arte and the Accademia di Belle Arti at Florence. In 1959 he moved to Brazil, where he produced abstract works using materials such as crystal, iron and steel. In 1962, he returned to Italy, first in Varese and then in Pesaro. Later, he became a member of the Accademia delle Arti del Disegno in Florence, the Accademia di San Luca in Rome, and exhibited his work in numerous places in Italy.

His works include the statue of St. John the Baptist in Florence, "La Lupa" in Siena, a crucifix and new presbytery for the Padua Cathedral, a new altar for the Pisa Cathedral and the entrance sculpture for the Vatican Museum.

Vangi died from leukemia on 26 March 2024, at the age of 93.
