= Alessandro Nova =

Italian art historian

Alessandro Ferruccio Nova (born 15 May 1954) is an Italian art historian who specialises in the Renaissance. He is Director Emeritus of the Art History Institute of Florence (KHI) – the Max-Plank-Institute and Honorary Professor of Goethe University Frankfurt (Goethe-Universität Frankfurt am Main).

== Early life and education ==
Nova was born in Milan in 1954 to Edoardo Nova, an engineer and university professor, and Maria Luisa Erba. His older brother Roberto Nova is Professor of Geotechnical Engineering at the Polytechnic University of Milan (Politecnico di Milano).

Alessandro Nova obtained his Lettere e Filosofia from the University of Milan (Università degli Studi di Milano) where he studied from 1973 to 1978 and a PhD from The Courtauld Institute of Art in London (1978–1982). His doctoral thesis on the artistic patronage of Pope Julius III led to the publication of the book The Artistic Patronage of Pope Julius III (1550-1555): Profane Imagery and Buildings for the De Monte Family in Rome in 1988. Photographs of Italy attributed to Alessandro Nova are held in the Conway Library at The Courtauld Institute of Art, London, whose archive, of primarily architectural images, is in the process of being digitised under the wider Courtauld Connects project.

With the support of research grants from Alexander von Humboldt-Stiftung (1985–86, 1989) he gained the title Dottorato di Ricerca from the University of Milan in 1986 with a thesis on the Brescian artist Girolamo Romanino and the 16th century School of painters.

== Career ==
From 1986 to 1987 Nova was a J. Paul Getty Postdoctoral Fellow and his first post, from 1988 to 1994, was as Assistant Professor at Stanford University. In 1994 he was appointed Professor of Renaissance Art at Goethe University Frankfurt where he remained until 2006 also becoming executive director of the Centre for Research into the Early Modern Period, Renaissance Institute (Zentrum zur Erforschung der Frühen Neuzeit, Renaissance Institut) in Frankfurt (2006-7). In 2006 it was announced that Nova had been appointed Director of the Art History Institute of Florence (KHI) – the Max-Plank-Institute He assumed management from the spring of 2007 until 2022 when he was made Director Emeritus.

He has lectured and taught at various international institutions including the Humboldt University of Berlin (1994) and the School for Advanced Studies in the Social Sciences (École des Hautes Études en Sciences Sociales) – CEHTA (Centre d'histoire et théorie des arts) in Paris (2001-2), and published extensively in Italian, German and English. A major project has been as editor of a new German translation of Le vite de' più eccellenti pittori, scultori e architettori by Giorgio Vasari published by Verlag Klauss Wagenbach in Berlin between 2004 and 2015.

=== Honours ===
Grand Officer Order of Merit of the Italian Republic (Grande Ufficiale Ordine al Merito della Repubblica Italiana) 2005

Honorary Member of the Accademia delle Arti del Disegno, Florence, 2008

== Selected publications ==
- Skulptur und Platz : Raumbesetzung, Raumüberwindung, Interaktion, Alessandro Nova and Stephanie Hanke, Berlin : Deutscher Kunstverlag, 2014, ISBN 9783422071728
- Leonardo da Vinci and Optics, eds. Francesca Fiorani and Alessandro Nova, Venice : Marsilio, November 2013, ISBN 9788831714945
- I Mondi di Vasari : accademia, lingua, religione, storia, teatro, eds. Alessandro Nova and Luigi Zangheri, Venezia [Italia] : Marsilio, 2013, ISBN 9788831717625
- Parmigianino : Zitat, Porträt, Mythos, Perugia : Guerra, 2006, ISBN 9788877159168
- Platz und Territorium: Urbane Struktur gestaltet politische Räume, Alessandro Nova and Cornelia Jöchner, München : Deutscher Kunstverlag, 2010, ISBN 9783422070059
- Imagination und Wirklichkeit : zum Verhältnis von mentalen und realen Bildern in der Kunst der frühen Neuzeit, Klaus Krüger and Alessandro Nova, Mainz : von Zabern, 2000, ISBN 3805327161
- The Artistic Patronage of Pope Julius III (1550-1555) : Profane Imagery and Buildings for the De Monte Family in Rome, New York; London : Garland, 1988, ISBN 0824000994
- Michelangelo, Pier Luigi De Vecchi, Valerio Guazzoni, Alessandro Nova, Milano : Jaca Book, 1984, ISBN 8816600365
