= Louis A. Waldman =

American art historian (born 1965)

Louis Alexander Waldman
- Born: Louis Alexander Waldman; October 29, 1965 (age 61) near Detroit, Michigan
- Education: Hunter College (B.A. in 1989) New York University Institute of Fine Arts (M.A. in 1993; Ph.D. in 1999)
- Occupations: Art Historian; former Author; former Associate Professor of Art History at University of Texas at Austin
- Notable work: Baccio Bandinelli and Art at the Medici Court: Corpus of Early Modern Sources: Memoirs of the American Philosophical Society (2004)
- Height: 5 ft 11 in (180 cm)

Louis Alexander Waldman (/wəldˈmin/; born October 29, 1965) is an American art historian specializing in the Italian Renaissance.

== Early life ==
Waldman was born near Detroit, Michigan on October 29, 1965. He attended Hunter College (B.A. 1989) and subsequently studied with Sir John Pope-Hennessy and with Kathleen Weil-Garris Brandt at the Institute of Fine Arts (Ph.D. 1999).

== Career ==
Waldman taught at the University of Texas at Austin, where they received the College of Fine Arts Teaching Excellence Award (2008), the Dads' Association Centennial Teaching Fellowship (2004), the Department of Art and Art History Teaching Excellence Award (2005), and the Texas Blazers Faculty Excellence Award (2008). They were the first Assistant Director for Programs at Villa I Tatti, The Harvard Center for Italian Renaissance Studies (2007–10), and was for several years Associate Editor of the journal I Tatti Studies. Waldman's research on Florentine art was characterized by an emphasis on reconstructing social networks, families, artists' shops, and the workings of patronage. Waldman held fellowships from the Samuel H. Kress Foundation at the Kunsthistorisches Institut in Florenz, the Fulbright Foundation, and Villa I Tatti. They were elected an Accademico d'onore of the Accademia delle Arti del Disegno in Florence in 2004.

== Research ==
A number of Waldman's publications employ a combination of archival research and connoisseurship to identify and reconstruct the careers of previously anonymous artists of the Renaissance. In a long series of essays, they established the identities of such prolific painters as Giovanni Larciani (formerly known as the Master of the Kress Landscapes), Bartolomeo Ghetti (formerly known as the Master of the Copenhagen Charity), Bernardo di Leonardo (formerly the Master of Memphis), Mariotto di Francesco Dolzemele (whom he hypothetically identified as the Master of Serumido), and others.

Waldman is known as a scholar unafraid of controversial topics. In 2007 an international media coup resulted from the claim by Hungarian art historian Mária Prokopp and Zsuzsanna Wierdl art restorer that a fresco in the Archiepiscopal Castle of Esztergom in Hungary was the work of Sandro Botticelli. The official endorsement of their discovery by Hungary's Minister of Culture in a much publicized press conference made debate difficult for by Hungarian academics and curators. Waldman published the first extended refutation of the Botticelli theory, which on the basis of historical and stylistic evidence he described as "abszurdus" (absurd). That negative judgement has been now reaffirmed by subsequent researchers in Hungary and abroad.

In the spring of 2008 Waldman identified a painting of the Annunciation in a provincial museum of Hungary, the Móra Ferenc Múzeum in Szeged, as the work of Giorgio Vasari. The work had previously been catalogued by the museum as the work of Agnolo Bronzino. A number of scholars doubted the Vasari attribution. The controversy received considerable public attention after Waldman, writing in the catalogue of an exhibition held at the Szépművészeti Múzeum in 2009, presented a preparatory drawing made by Vasari for the painting (now in the Pierpont Morgan Library, New York) and identified it on the basis of documents as part of the lost decorations for the Chapel of St. Michael in the Torre Pia of the Vatican, which Vasari painted for Pope Pius V in 1570-71.

Waldman again made headlines in April 2009 when they publicly presented documentary evidence revealing that some time before June 1505 Leonardo da Vinci painted a portrait of his beloved uncle, Francesco da Vinci. They argued that the red-chalk drawing in Turin—one of the most famous drawings in the history of art due to its frequent misidentification as a self-portrait—is likely to be a preparatory study for the lost painting of Leonardo's uncle.

== Personal life ==
Waldman's early childhood, and in particular their relationship with their troubled and abusive father (who died when he was nine) is discussed in a memoir by their sister Sharon Harrigan, Playing with Dynamite (Truman State University Press, 2017). His second wife was the well known art historian Janet Cox-Rearick.

== Bibliography ==
- Baccio Bandinelli and Art at the Medici Court: A Corpus of Early Modern Sources (Philadelphia: American Philosophical Society, 2004).
- Edited (with Caroline Elam): Craig Hugh Smyth—In Memoriam (Florence: Leo S. Olschki, 2009).
- Edited (with Machtelt Israëls): Toward a Festschrift: Renaissance Studies in Honor of Joseph Connors (Florence: Leo S. Olschki, 2010).
- Edited (with Péter Farbaky): Italy and Hungary: Humanism and Art in the Early Renaissance (Florence: Officina Editrice, 2011).
- Edited (with Gerhard Wolf and Joseph Connors): Colors Between Two Worlds: The Florentine Codex of Bernardino de Sahagún (Florence: Officina Editrice, 2011).

== Bibliography ==
Cristina Acidini Luchinat, "Presentazione," in La valle dei tesori, exh. cat., Fucecchio, Museo Civico, 2006, unpaginated.
