= Lino Pertile =

Italian literary scholar and Dante specialist

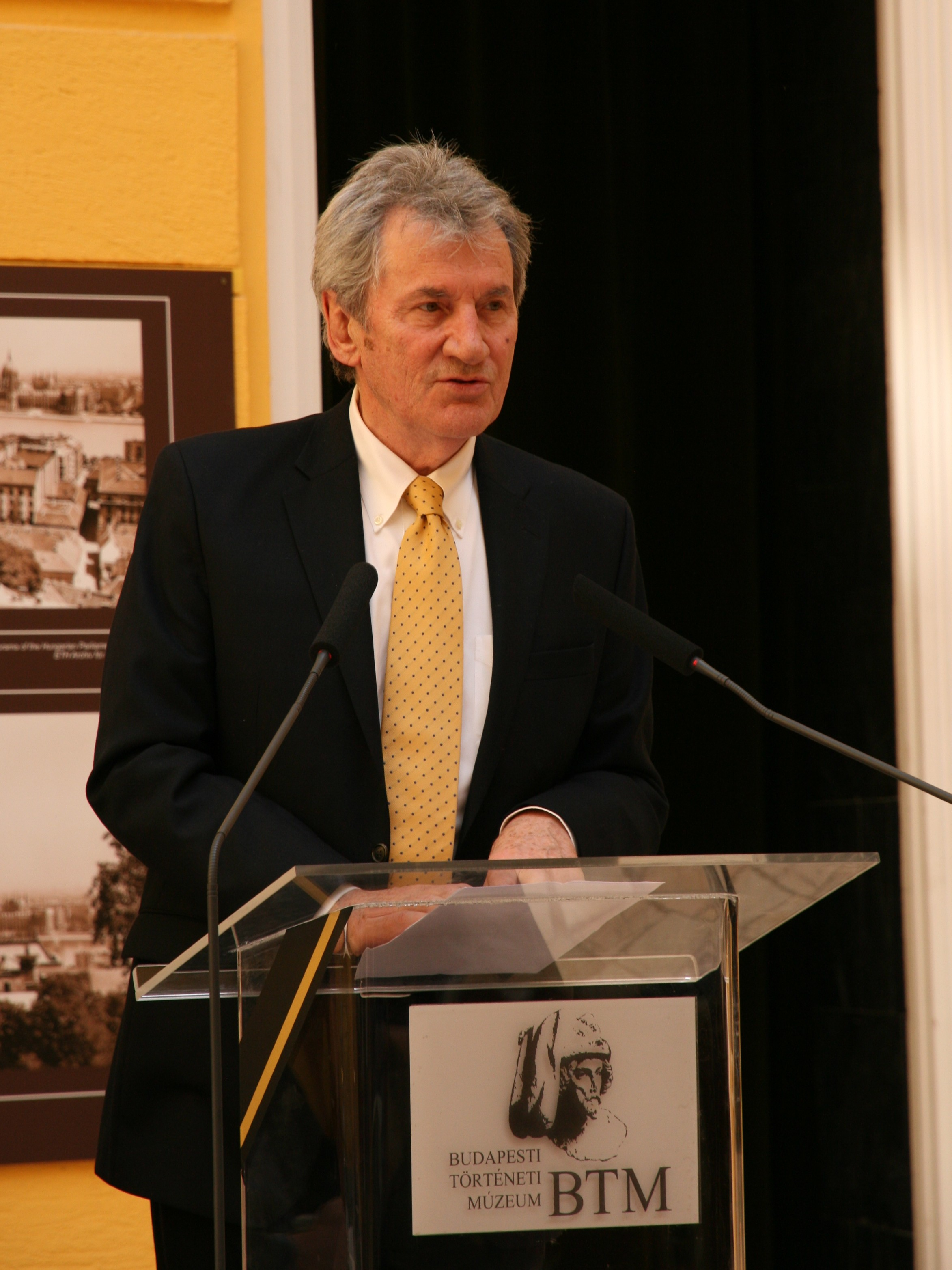
Lino Pertile

Lino Pertile (born 1940) is an Italian literary scholar and professor emeritus at Harvard University, where he holds the title of Carl A. Pescosolido Research Professor of Romance Languages and Literatures. He is best known for his work on Dante and the Italian Renaissance, and served as director of Villa I Tatti, the Harvard University Center for Italian Renaissance Studies in Florence, from 2010 to 2015. He is a member of both the Accademia Nazionale dei Lincei and the Accademia Ambrosiana in Rome.

== Early life and education ==
Pertile was born in 1940 near Padua, in northeastern Italy. He studied Classics and French at the University of Padua, graduating in 1965. After completing his degree, he taught Italian literature in France and Italy between 1964 and 1968 before moving to the United Kingdom.

== Career ==
Pertile spent much of his early academic career in Britain. He held posts at the University of Reading and the University of Sussex before being appointed Professor of Italian at the University of Edinburgh, a position he held from 1988 to 1995. In 1995 he joined Harvard University as Professor of Italian Literature in the Department of Romance Languages and Literatures.

At Harvard, Pertile served as House Master of Eliot House for ten years, from 2000 to 2010. In 2005, he was named a Harvard College Professor, a distinction awarded to faculty members who have shown exceptional dedication to undergraduate teaching. In December 2009, it was announced that Pertile would become the new director of Villa I Tatti, a role he took on in the summer of 2010 and held until 2015. He has also served on the Board of Editors for the Dante Society of America.

== Research ==
Pertile's scholarly work covers the Latin and Italian Middle Ages, the Renaissance, and twentieth-century Italian literature. His primary focus has been on Dante, though he has also written on Pietro Bembo, Michel de Montaigne, and the novelist Cesare Pavese. His research on Dante has ranged from textual editing to thematic analysis of the Divine Comedy.

Among his books on Dante is the critical edition of the sixteenth-century commentary Annotationi nel Dante fatte con M. Triphon Gabriele in Bassano (Bologna: Commissione per i testi di lingua, 1993). His volume La puttana e il gigante: dal Cantico dei Cantici al Paradiso terrestre di Dante (Ravenna: Longo, 1998) received the Premio Zingarelli. A further study, La punta del disio: Semantica del desiderio nella Commedia (Florence: Cadmo, 2005), examines the language of desire across Dante's poem.

Pertile has edited and contributed to several collaborative volumes. He co-edited The New Italian Novel (Edinburgh University Press, 1993), The Cambridge History of Italian Literature (Cambridge University Press, 1996), and Dante in Context (Cambridge University Press, 2015). His lecture essay Songs Beyond Mankind: Poetry and the Lager from Dante to Primo Levi was published by the Center for Medieval and Renaissance Studies at the State University of New York at Binghamton in 2013.

== Selected bibliography ==
- Annotationi nel Dante fatte con M. Triphon Gabriele in Bassano (ed.), Bologna: Commissione per i testi di lingua, 1993
- The New Italian Novel (co-ed.), Edinburgh University Press, 1993
- The Cambridge History of Italian Literature (co-ed. with Peter Brand), Cambridge University Press, 1996
- La puttana e il gigante: dal Cantico dei Cantici al Paradiso terrestre di Dante, Ravenna: Longo, 1998
- La punta del disio: Semantica del desiderio nella Commedia, Florence: Cadmo, 2005
- Dante in Context (co-ed.), Cambridge University Press, 2015
