= Gauvin Alexander Bailey =

American art historian

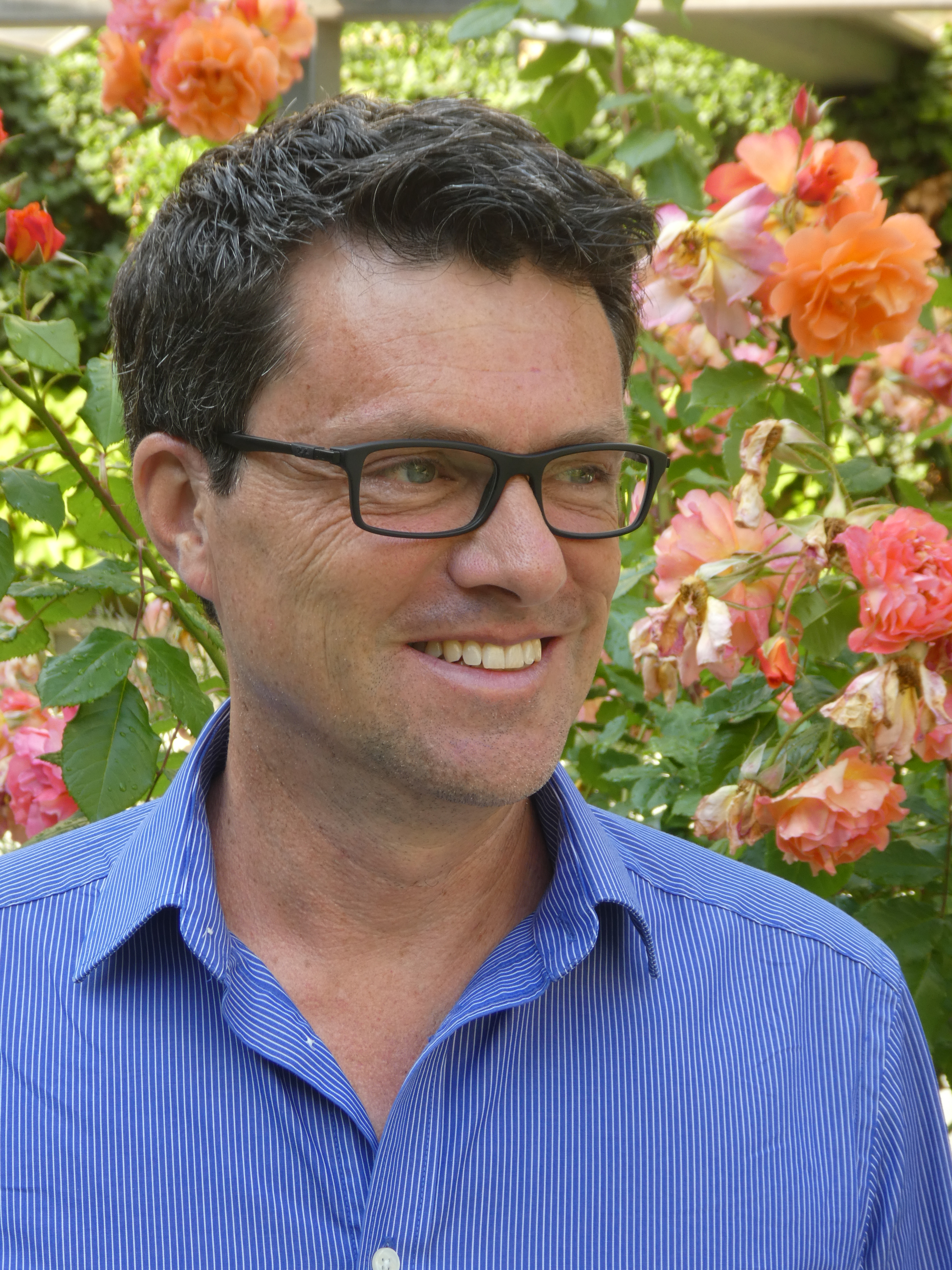
Alexander Bailey in Zentralinstitut für Kunstgeschichte, Munich, 2017.

Gauvin Alexander Bailey is an American-Canadian author and art historian. He is Professor and Alfred and Isabel Bader Chair in Southern Baroque Art at Queen's University.

Bailey is a correspondent étranger at the Académie des Inscriptions et Belles-Lettres, Institut de France and a Fellow of the Royal Society of Canada. He held the 2017 Panofsky Professorship at the Zentralinstitut für Kunstgeschichte in Munich.

== Early life and education ==
Bailey was born in Vancouver, B.C., on 8 July 1966. He attended the Schillergymnasium Münster among other schools, and graduated from Trinity College, Toronto at the University of Toronto with a B.A. in art history in 1989 and M.A. in Middle Eastern and Islamic Studies in 1990, and from Harvard University with a Ph.D. in art in 1996.

== Career ==
Bailey has taught Renaissance, Baroque, Latin American, and Asian art at King’s College at the University of Aberdeen, Boston College and Clark University, where he was program director for Art History and twice won the Hodgkins Junior Faculty Teaching Award (1999, 2002), and he has held guest professorships at the Zentralinstitut für Kunstgeschichte in Munich (as the 2017 Panofsky Professor), Boston University and Georgetown University.

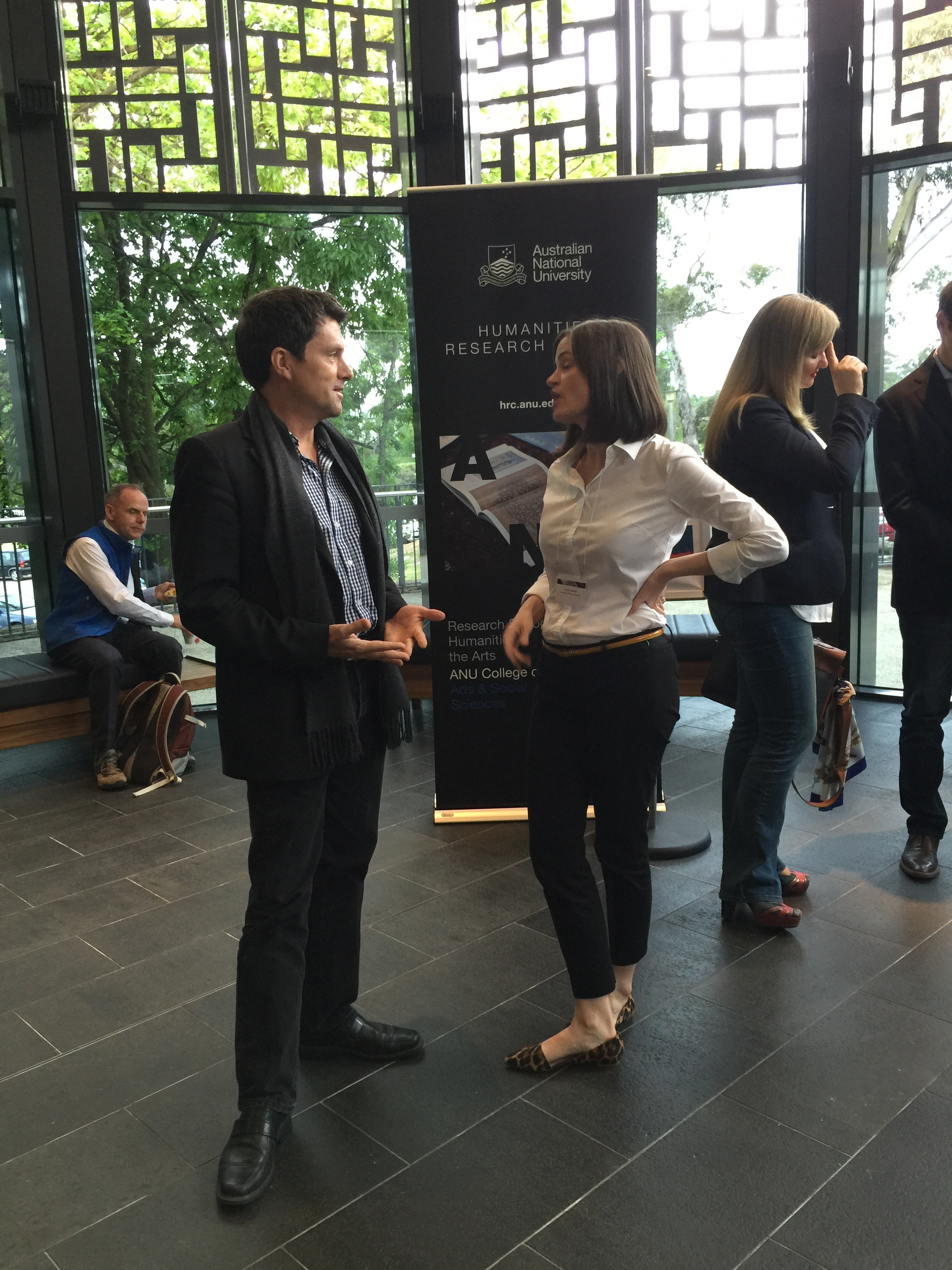
Bailey at Australian National University, 22 October 2015

== Research and publications ==
He has published eleven books including, most recently, Architecture and Slavery in the French Indian Ocean: Madagascar and the Mascarenes, 1643-1848 (McGill–Queen's University Press, 2026), The Architecture of Empire: France in India and Southeast Asia, 1664–1962 (McGill–Queen's University Press, 2022), The Palace of Sans-Souci in Milot, Haiti (ca. 1806–13): the Untold Story of the Potsdam of the Rainforest (Deutscher Kunstverlag, 2017) and Architecture & Urbanism in the French Atlantic Empire: State, Church and Identity, 1604–1830 (McGill-Queen’s University Press, 2018). He has also co-authored or co-edited seven other books and over 80 articles and book chapters on topics ranging from Renaissance ivories carved in the Philippines to Baroque paintings in Italy in a time of Plague (disease), especially Anthony van Dyck and the cult of Saint Rosalia. Bailey maintains an active international lecture schedule and has made over 100 presentations at academic institutions and museums on six continents, including Harvard University, Yale University, the New York University Institute of Fine Arts, the Center for Advanced Studies in the Visual Arts at the National Gallery of Art, the Getty Research Institute, the University of Cambridge, the Courtauld Institute of Art (London), the University of London, the University of St. Andrews, the University of Edinburgh, the Institut de France, Sorbonne University, Sapienza University of Rome, the Bibliotheca Hertziana, Rome, University of Heidelberg, University of Innsbruck and the Metropolitan Museum of Art, among many others, particularly in South America. His work has been translated into French, German, Italian, Spanish, Portuguese, Chinese, and Japanese. He regularly contributes exhibition and book reviews to The Burlington Magazine and The Art Newspaper.

== Major Awards ==
- 2018 National Endowment for the Humanities Research Fellowship
- 2018 Social Sciences and Humanities Research Council of Canada Insight Grant.
- 2014 National Endowment for the Humanities Research Fellowship. NEH grant products: Art and Architecture in the French Atlantic World, 1608–1828
- 2014 Social Sciences and Humanities Research Council of Canada Insight Development Grant.Diverse projects earn funding
- 2010 Guggenheim Fellowship.
- 2010 American Philosophical Society Franklin Research Grant Franklin Research Grants
- 2010 Arts and Humanities Research Council Fellowship.
- 2010 Carnegie Trust for the Universities of Scotland Grant. Latin travels unearth ‘architectural treasures’ for Aberdeen academic | News | The University of Aberdeen
- 2009 British Academy Research Grant Small Research Grants: 2008–09 Round
- 2007 Renaissance Society of America Robert Lehman Foundation Research Grant RSA Fellowship Winners – Renaissance Society of America
- 2006 American Philosophical Society Franklin Research Grant Franklin Research Grants
- 2005 American Philosophical Society Franklin Research Grant Franklin Research Grants
- 2005 National Endowment for the Humanities Research Fellowship NEH grants
- 2003 Renaissance Society of America Robert Lehman Foundation Research Grant RSA Fellowship Winners – Renaissance Society of America
- 2000 Villa I Tatti Hanna Kiel Fellowship
- 2000 American Academy in Rome Rome Prize
- 2000 Renaissance Society of America Robert Lehman Foundation Research Grant RSA Fellowship Winners – Renaissance Society of America

== Books ==
- Architecture and Slavery in the French Indian Ocean: Madagascar and the Mascarenes, 1643-1848, Montreal: McGill-Queen's University Press, 2026,
- The Architecture of Empire: France in India and Southeast Asia, 1664–1962, Montreal: McGill-Queen's University Press, 2022,
- Architecture and Urbanism in the French Atlantic Empire: State, Church, and Society, 1604–1830, Montreal: McGill-Queen's University Press, 2018, Architecture and Urbanism in the French Atlantic Empire | McGill-Queen’s University Press Reviewed in Transactions of the Society of Architectural Historians Review: Architecture and Urbanism in the French Atlantic Empire: State, Church, and Society, 1604–1830, by Gauvin Alexander Bailey,Canadian Architect, Journal of the Royal Architectural Institute of CanadaBook Review: Architecture and Urbanism in the French Atlantic Empire; Transactions of the Ancient Monuments SocietyTransactions – Ancient Monuments Society and the Journal of Modern History Architecture and Urbanism in the French Atlantic Empire: State, Church, and Society, 1604–1830. By Gauvin Alexander Bailey. McGill-Queen’s French Atlantic Worlds Series, volume 1. Edited by Nicholas Dew and Jean-Pierre Le Glaunec.Montreal: McGill-Queen’s University Press, 2018. Pp. xviii+620. $67.50.
- Der Palast von Sans-Souci in Milot, Haiti (ca. 1806–1813): Das vergessene Potsdam im Regenwald/The Palace of Sans-Souci in Milot, Haiti (ca. 1806–13): The Untold Story of the Potsdam of the Rainforest. Berlin and Munich: Zentralinstitut für Kunstgeschichte and Deutscher Kunstverlag, 2017. Deutscher Kunstverlag – Vorschau Reviewed in The Art Newspaper. Book review | Henry I of Haiti: the little-known story of a king and his amazing building spree
- The Spiritual Rococo: Décor and Divinity from the Salons of Paris to the Missions of Patagonia. Farnham, Surrey: Ashgate, 2014.The Spiritual Rococo: Decor and Divinity from the Salons of Paris to the Missions of Patagonia
- Baroque & Rococo. London: Phaidon Press, 2012.Baroque & Rococo | Art | Phaidon Store Reviewed in The SpectatorA selection of recent art books | The Spectator
- The Andean Hybrid Baroque: Convergent Cultures in the Churches of Colonial Peru, University of Notre Dame Press, 2010, The Andean Hybrid Baroque // Books // University of Notre Dame Press Spanish edition El barroco andino híbrido: culturas convergentes en las iglesias del Sur Andino published by Ediciones El Lector, Arequipa, 2018. El Barroco Andino Híbrido. Culturas convergentes en las iglesias coloniales del Sur Andino – LIBROS PERUANOS
- Art of colonial Latin America, Phaidon, 2005, ISBN 978-0-7148-4157-1 Reviewed in The Times and The Observer (a Book of the Year for 2005).Books of the year
- Between Renaissance and Baroque: Jesuit Art in Rome, 1565–1610. Toronto: University of Toronto Press, 2003.
- Art on the Jesuit missions in Asia and Latin America, 1542–1773, University of Toronto Press, 2001 Winner of the 2001 Roland H. Bainton Book Prize for Art and Music.
- The Jesuits and the Grand Mogul: Renaissance Art at the Imperial Court of India, 1580–1630. Washington: Smithsonian Institution, 1998.
