= Tista De Lorenzo =

Australian rules footballer (1934–2025)

Personal information
- Full name: John Baptista De Lorenzo
- Born: 23 August 1934
- Died: 7 January 2025 (aged 90)
- Original team: Dandenong
- Height: 183 cm (6 ft 0 in)
- Weight: 84 kg (185 lb)

Playing career
| Years | Club | Games (Goals) |
| 1958 | Richmond | 10 (0) |

John Baptista 'Tista' De Lorenzo (23 August 1934 – 7 January 2025) was an Australian rules footballer who played with Richmond in the Victorian Football League (VFL).

De Lorenzo appeared in practice matches for Melbourne prior to the 1958 VFL season, but Richmond successfully claimed De Lorenzo was tied residentially to Richmond because he had lived in Oakleigh (Richmond's zone) for the required 13 weeks. He made his debut in Round 9 against North Melbourne and played the final ten games of the season.

After his VFL career, he operated several businesses before moving to Dimboola in 1988 to run the Victoria Hotel.
