= Giovanni de Lorenzo Larciani =

Italian painter (1484–1527)

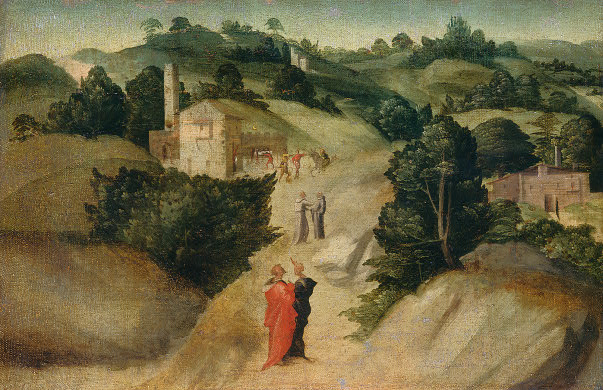
Kress Landscape

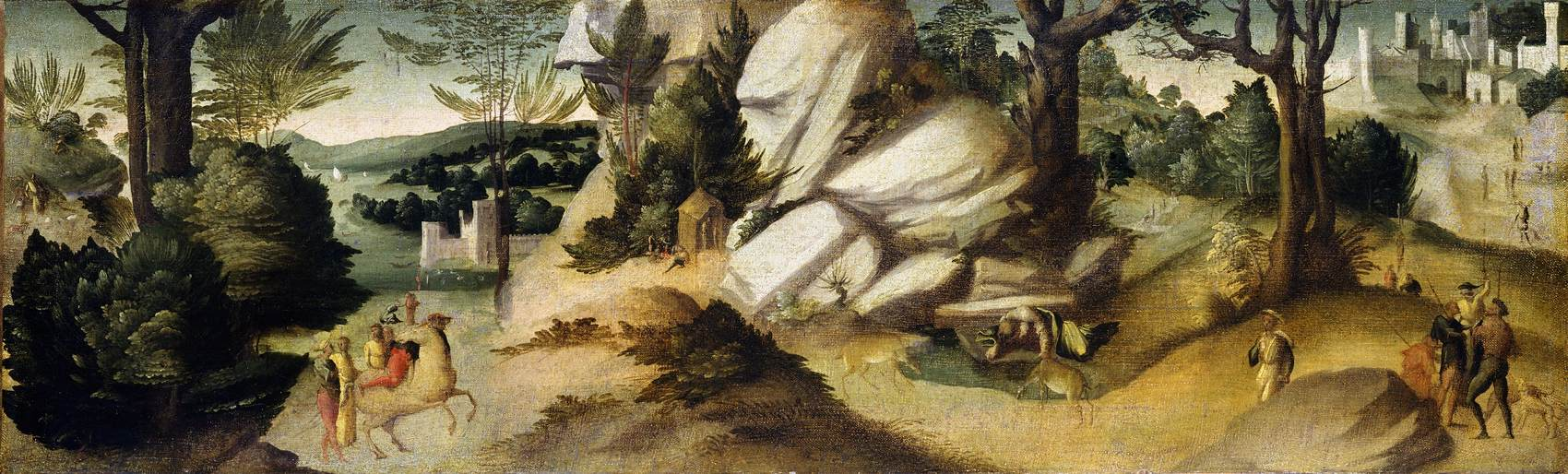
Kress Landscape (Scene from a Legend)

Giovanni di Lorenzo Larciani (1484 - 1527) was an Italian painter. He was originally referred to as the Maestro dei paesaggi Kress (Master of the Kress Landscapes).

== Work & attribution ==
His original name referred to a body of works at the National Gallery of Art that form part of the Kress Collection. He is also now known to be the creator of a Holy Family and Four Saints at the Museo di Fucecchio. While studying that work, Louis Alexander Waldman discovered documents, including a contract from 1521, that linked it with someone named Giovanni Larciani, whose biography and oeuvre the same scholar has reconstructed in a series of publications.

Works that had already been assigned to a young Rosso Fiorentino (such as the Madonna and Child at the Galleria Borghese, 1510–1515, and a similar work at the Museo statale d'arte medievale e moderna|Museo statale d'arte medievale e moderna in Arezzo, c.1510-1520), were now reassigned to Larciani. He may also have painted Portrait of a Young Woman, also previously attributed as a very early Rosso work. He is credited with the background landscape in Joseph Being Led to Prison by Francesco Granacci, painted for the Camera nuziale Borgherini

He has since been credited with a Madonna and Child at the Galerie Hans in Hamburg and a Holy Family with St.John at the Galleria Borghese.

== Sources ==
- Federico Zeri: "Eccentrici fiorentini - Il pittore dei Paesaggi Kress". In: Bolletino d'Arte, 47, 1 (1962) pg. 227.
- L. A. Waldman: The 'Master of the Kress Landscapes' Unmasked: Giovanni Larciani and the Fucecchio Altar-piece". In: The Burlington Magazine, 140, 1998, pgs. 456–469.
- Antonio Natali, Rosso Fiorentino, Silvana Editore, Milano 2006. ISBN 88-366-0631-8
