= Fernando Caruncho =

Spanish landscape designer (1957–2026)

- Born: 6 September 1957; Madrid, Spain
- Died: 20 August 2026 (aged 68)
- Occupations: Landscape designer and philosopher
- Years active: 1978–2026
- Website: fernandocaruncho.com

Fernando Caruncho (Madrid, Spain, 6 September 1957 – 20 August 2026) was an internationally renowned landscape architect and philosopher. He is known for his gardens based on the primordial language of geometry and light, the incorporation of agriculture into the garden and the connection between the garden and the landscape. He designed around two hundred gardens around the world, including the golden wheat fields of Mas de les Voltes in the Empordà, the undulating vineyards of L’Amastuola in Puglia, the Santar Gardens in Portugal, Bird Haven Farm in New Jersey, and the gardens of Al Maadem in Marrakech.

== Background ==
Caruncho studied philosophy at the Autonomous University of Madrid from 1975, and then, from 1979, landscape design at the Castillo de Batres, a private landscaping school in Madrid.

Caruncho died on 20 August 2026, at the age of 68.

== Career ==
In 1979 Caruncho established his own studio. His work at a house in Madrid was published in Vogue Decoration in May 1987. His work was published again in Vogue Decoration in July 1992.

Caruncho was included in a list of ten great contemporary Landscape designers.

His career continued with a series of projects in Spain, at locations such as the Alhambra, the Patio de los Naranjos, and the Alcazar in Seville.

His later projects were in Lugano, Switzerland; Isola Bella, a Project of an island in Maine, Fundación Botín working together with Renzo Piano in Santander, Spain; a Project next to the sea in Greece; and one at Vigneto de L'Amastuola in Apulia, Italy.

He was an honorary member of the Accademia delle Arti del Disegno of Florence, and a member of the Circulo Fortuny of the European Cultural and Creative Industries Alliance.

== About his work ==
Dan Kiley, an American landscape designer, wrote the preface to the book Mirrors of Paradise by Guy Cooper and Gordon Taylor, a book that summaried the first 15 years of Caruncho's work. Kiley recognises Caruncho as his successor, as he bases on his same principles and design ideals:

"My career is approaching its sunset, and in Caruncho I see someone who may well be the only landscape architect who is guided by the same principles and ideals that I have tried to realize over the course of my work. I have been hoping that my way of thinking, which is purely a method of recognizing and solving a problem and is not necessarily unique to me, would be projected, and I believe he is the ideal one to carry it forward."

Kiley also highlights the influence that religion has on Caruncho's work:

"Caruncho's decides to value his religion. It is easy to see his correspondence of religion and environment, like falling over into something it's obvious once you have the knowledge and the background. In his own words, "What is religion but our desire to know where, how, and why we stand in this world? And as I said in my own book, "The greatest contribution a designer can make is to link the human and the natural in such a way as to recall our fundamental place in the scheme of things."

According to Guy Cooper and Gordon Taylor:

"Ancient agriculture meets formal contemporary garden design in the late twentieth century. Caruncho is classically educated, as can be seen from any of his designs which combine profound simplicity with extraordinary sophistication. Caruncho says that his designs are a constant attempt "to capture the light (vibration lumineuse) "in the garden space, through a formal setting of the simplest elements: "everything in a Spanish garden is founded in how you deal with the light" "Caruncho sees the garden as a mirror of the universe: "I strive to arrange a space that invites reflection and inquiry by allowing the light to delineate geometries, perspectives and symmetries"

Kirsty Fergusson remarks Caruncho's philosophical bases as a trigger of his curiosity in the relation between man and nature, and its application to the world of garden and the diverse influences if Zen, European Classicism on his work. Caruncho believed light "makes the languages of geometry intelligible".

Although most of Fernando Caruncho gardens are not open to the public, Paul Jean Piaget says they will leave a deep mark in the Mediterranean Garden scenery in the coming decades.

According to Jane Amidon Caruncho rearranges the elements of the garden to get an impression of modernity: "A classicist at first glance, landscape architect Fernando Caruncho takes traditional crops, harvest techniques and water-collection methods and rearranges then to find a modernist spatial sensibility."

Penelope Hobhouse has described his work as the antithesis to the English Jekyll Style Garden. His designs are implemented on a grid system which Hobhouse says "unites all the individual elements". She says Cauruncho "brings a basic purity to design, using straight lines and right angles on a large landscape scale, emphasizing light and shadow, movement, form, leaf colour, and texture, with little reference to flowers.'

Nancy Hass, in her article for T Magazine of The New York Times writes:

"At first glance, the hypnotic curves of Amastuola seem uncharacteristic of Caruncho. He is a master of the right angle, of near impossible planes and monochromatic environments…but the vineyard…combines an allegiance to straight lines with an organic impulse…visually you have the shock of the grid against the waves"

Tim Richardson says:

"His particular brand of formality runs deep; it is not a simple design tool but a fundamental belief, inspired by his philosophical studies notably of the ancient Greeks. The sense of order and balance, of permanence and history is archived by bringing together by Caruncho own aesthetic heritage and the history of the landscape. He is particularly interested in the science of irrigation and ancient agricultural patterns."

== Projects ==
Among the more than 150 projects, some of the most significant projects are:

- Mas de les Voltes, Ampurdán, Spain
- Casa Caruncho, Madrid, Spain
- Mas Floris, Ampurdán, Spain
- Flynn, Boca Ratón, Florida, USA
- Mavec-Nordberg, New Jersey, USA
- Isola Bella, Maine, USA
- Hauraki Gulf Garden, the North Island of New Zealand
- Embassy of Spain, Tokyo, Japan
- Garden of the Seven Mountains, Lugano, Switzerland
- Casa del Agua, Greece
- Jardines de Pereda, Fundación Botín, Santander, Spain.
