= Portrait of a Young Woman (Rosso Fiorentino) =

1510 oil painting

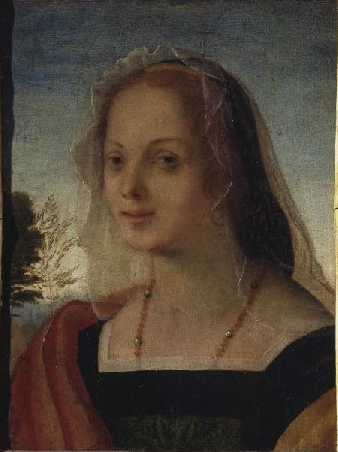
Portrait of a Young Woman (c. 1510) attributed to Rosso Fiorentino

Portrait of a Young Woman is an oil-on-canvas painting dated c. 1510 attributed to the Italian Mannerist painter Rosso Fiorentino. Giovanni Larciani (Master of the Kress Landscapes) has also been suggested as its artist. It is now in the Uffizi in Florence. The painting is thought to be an early work by Rosso, produced before the frescos of the Chiostrino dei Voti at Santissima Annunziata, Florence, though style differences with Rosso's other work have caused discussion about the attribution.

Against the backdrop of a briefly sketched landscape, with two small trees standing out against a sloping sky, is the bust of a girl, three-quarters facing left. Her clothing recalls that of the early 16th century, with a black dress with green trim, square neckline, and interchangeable yellow sleeves with red drapery over her right shoulder. A necklace fits into the décolleté, the edge of which is trimmed with white lace, and a veil covers the head. This attire is very similar, for example, to that of Raphael's La Gravida (The Pregnant Woman), from around 1505–1506. This contrasts with the thin, barely perceptible golden halo behind the head, which would instead suggest the figure of a saint: In the last restoration (2012), the halo and veil were revealed to be apocryphal, added to make the woman resemble a Mary Magdalene. The neckline was also softened and a small ampoule added.

The girl, hinting at a delicate smile, resembles some girls in Andrea del Sarto's Nativity of the Virgin and Rosso's Assumption of the Virgin, both works in the Chiostrino dei Voti dell'Annunziata. She is set against a landscape hinted at by quick natural notes (two small trees, an indefinite blanket of shrubs) and a sky in gradually fading tones, lighter at the horizon.

A radical cleaning in ancient times partially compromised its color. The painting has been in the Uffizi since 1894.

== Bibliography (in Italian) ==
- Gloria Fossi, Uffizi, Giunti, Firenze 2004. ISBN 88-09-03675-1
- Antonio Natali, Rosso Fiorentino, Silvana Editore, Milano 2006. ISBN 88-366-0631-8
- Elisabetta Marchetti Letta, Pontormo, Rosso Fiorentino, Scala, Firenze 1994. ISBN 88-8117-028-0
