= Villa I Tatti =

Italian research center

Coordinates: 43°47′11″N 11°18′35″E

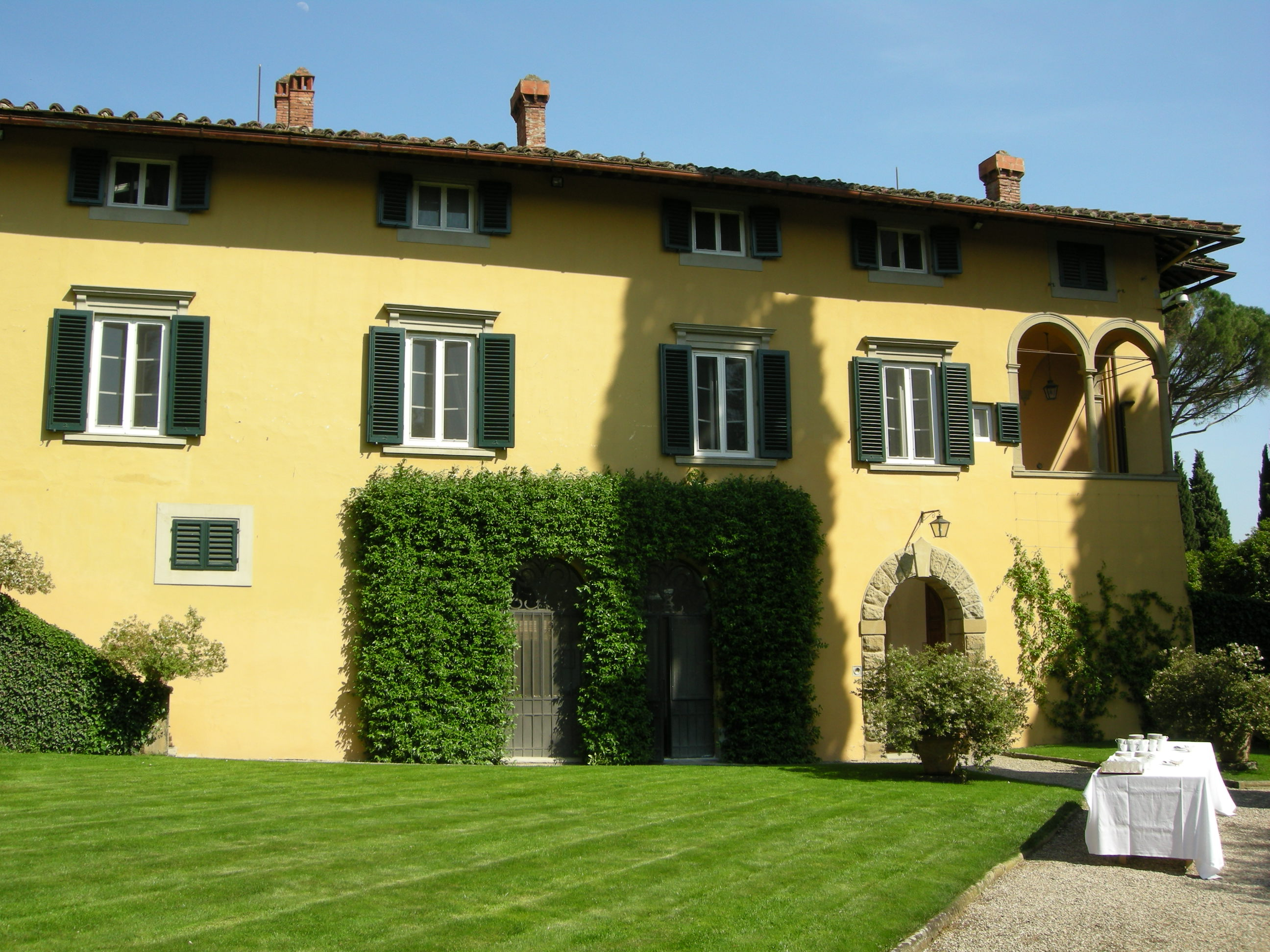
Villa I Tatti

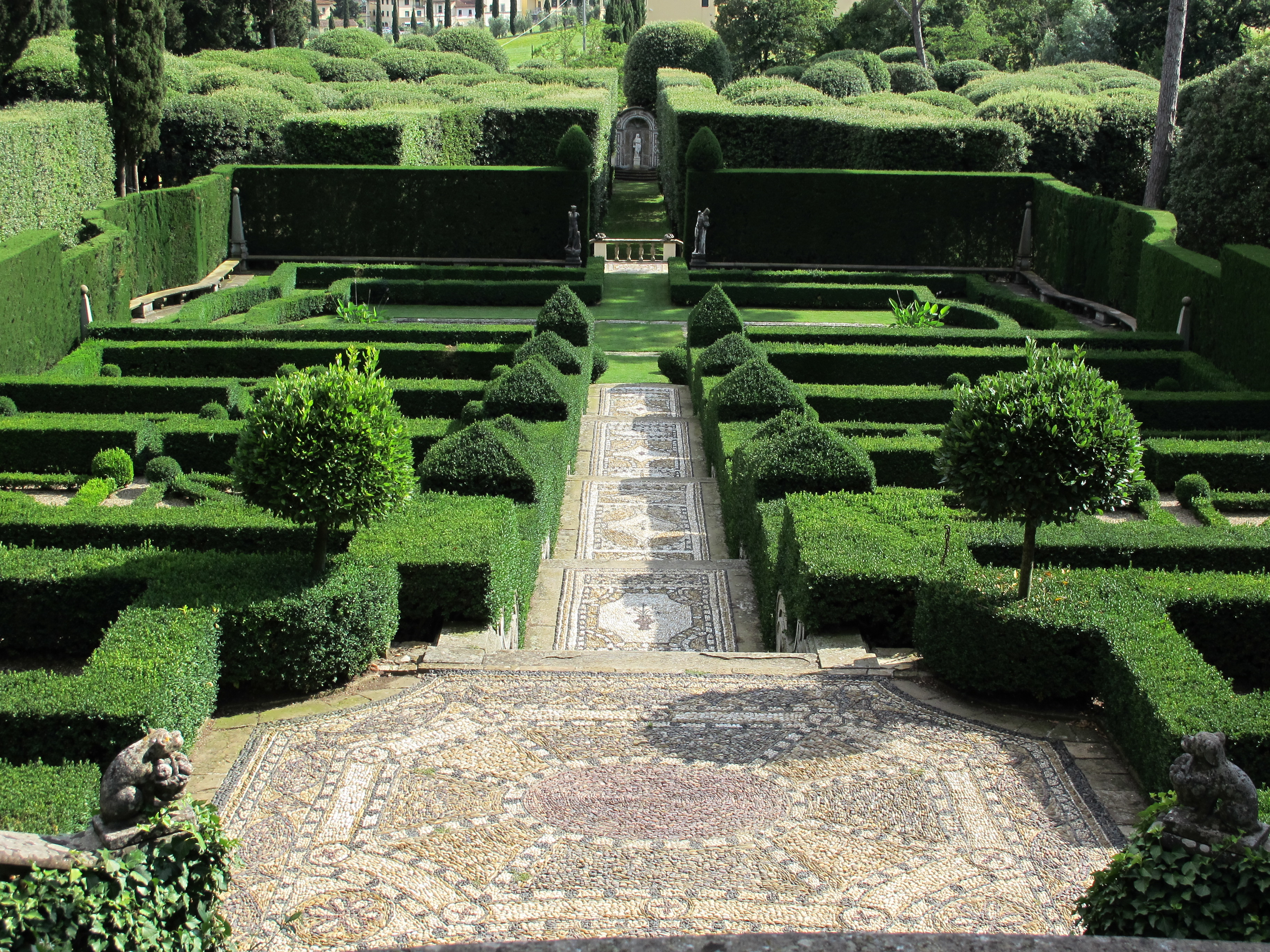
The gardens

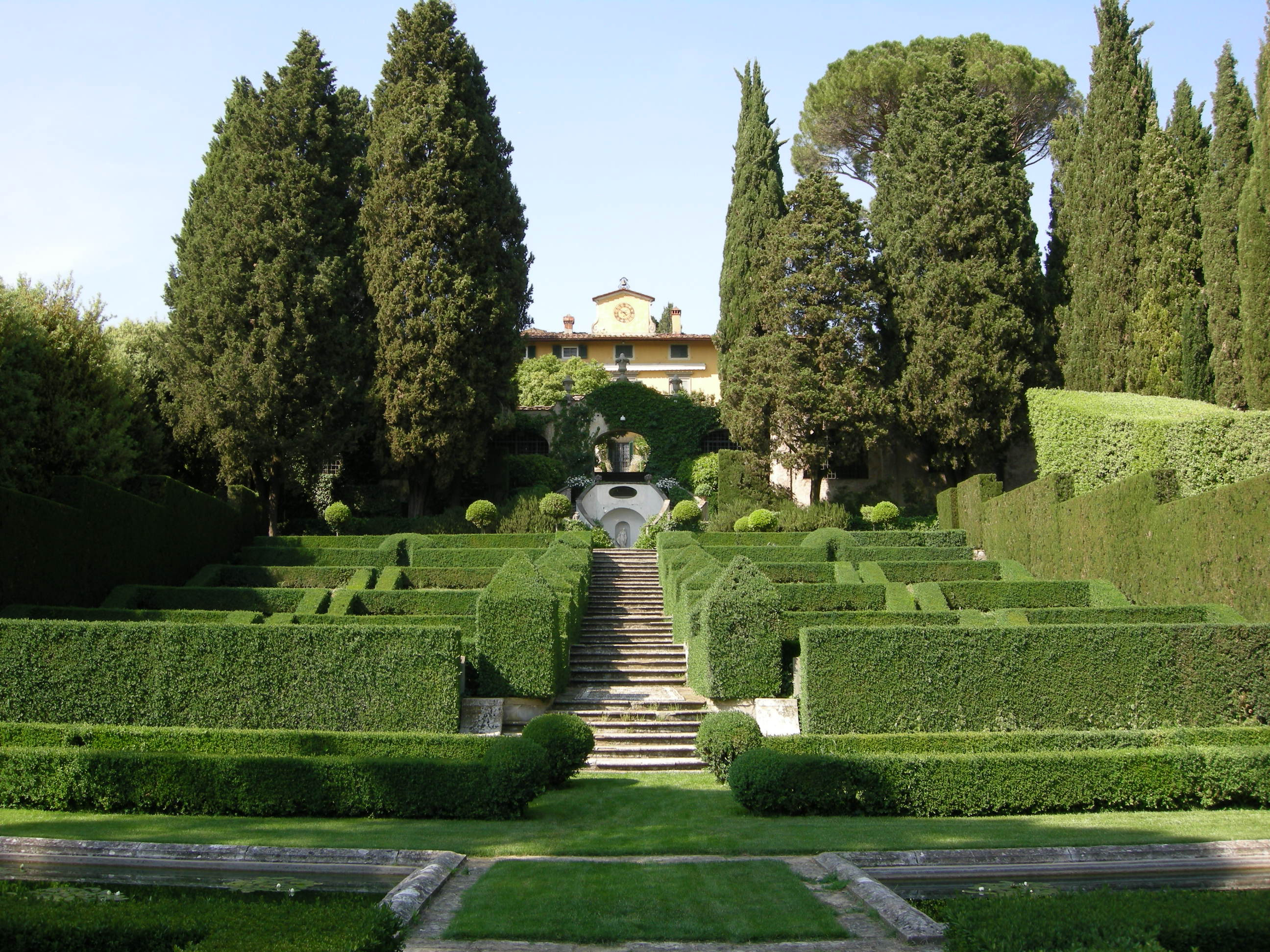
The villa from the gardens

Villa I Tatti, The Harvard Center for Italian Renaissance Studies is a center for advanced research in the humanities located in Florence, Italy, and belongs to Harvard University. It houses a collection of Italian primitives, and of Chinese and Islamic art, as well as a research library of 140,000 volumes and a collection of 250,000 photographs. It is the site of Italian and English gardens. Villa I Tatti is located on an estate of olive groves, vineyards, and gardens on the border of Florence, Fiesole and Settignano.

While guided tours of the gardens are offered, Villa I Tatti itself is not generally open to the public.

== History ==
For almost sixty years Villa I Tatti was the home of Bernard Berenson (1865–1959), the connoisseur whose attributions of early Italian Renaissance painting guided scholarship and collecting in this field for the first half of the twentieth century.

The property originated as a seventeenth-century farmhouse given to the expatriate English John Temple Leader in 1854 after being owned by multiple Italian families. In 1900, Bernard Berenson married Mary Whitall Pearsall Smith, who had formerly been married to the British politician Frank Costelloe. Mary came from a liberal Quaker family from Philadelphia, and had two daughters from her previous marriage, but the marriage to Berenson remained childless. The couple moved to I Tatti shortly before their marriage, first renting the property from Temple Leader, and about 1907 (Note: sources differ on whether the purchase happened in 1906, 1907 or 1908) buying it outright from Temple Leader's heir, Richard Bethell, 3rd Baron Westbury. Under Mary Berenson's supervision, the property was transformed into a Renaissance-style villa with the assistance of the English architect and writer Geoffrey Scott, while a formal garden in the Anglo-Italian Renaissance style was laid out by the English landscape architect Cecil Pinsent. This work was completed in 1915.

Mary and Bernard Berenson envisaged Villa I Tatti as a "lay monastery" for the leisurely study of Mediterranean culture through its art. Bernard was against academic production, specialization, degrees, and what are now called in the Italian academic world "titoli", and instead prized the slow maturing of ideas in tranquil contemplation. He considered his own achievement to lie as much in conversation as in writing.

Berenson died at the age of 94 in 1959 after bequeathing the estate, the collection, and the library to Harvard University. "Villa I Tatti, The Harvard Center for Italian Renaissance Studies", as it was officially named, opened its doors to six fellows in 1961. Since then it has welcomed over 700 fellows and visiting scholars from the United States and Canada, Japan, Australia, and almost all of the European countries.

=== The Berensons and Harvard ===
Berenson's esteem for Harvard dated from his youth. He arrived in Boston at age ten as a poor Jewish immigrant from Lithuania. His brilliance was soon recognized and, after finishing the Boston Latin School and completing a year at Boston University, he was supported through Harvard College by wealthier members of Boston society, graduating with the class of 1887. His interests there were in literature and ancient and oriental languages. He trained himself as a connoisseur of early Italian painting by travel throughout Europe and especially Italy, beginning in 1887. As early as 1915, he expressed his intention to leave his house and library to Harvard, and he reaffirmed his intention in 1937, in a letter published in the fiftieth-anniversary volume of his Harvard class. However, Fascism, war, and post-war travail in Italy led Harvard to hesitate, and the bequest was only formally accepted by the Harvard Corporation at the time of Berenson's death in 1959, opening its doors to the first class of fellows in 1961.

== Green Garden at Villa I Tatti ==
The garden was created beginning in 1909 by the then young and inexperienced garden designer Cecil Pinsent. Pinsent had been touring Tuscany making topographic drawings of buildings together with his friend Geoffrey Scott. They were both hired to work on I Tatti through Scott's connection with Berenson's wife, Mary (Scott was hired as Bernard Berenson's personal secretary between 1907 and 1909). I Tatti was to become a formidable test, through which Pinsent could become a recognized specialist of the formal garden. When the Berensons had acquired the estate five years prior, the property was desolate. Erika Neubauer considers I Tatti "possibly [Pinsent's] most important garden layout".

The Green Garden at I Tatti was Pinsent's first attempt to recreate a garden in the early Renaissance style. It was conceived as an outdoor extension of the house, an unfolding sequence, designed with the open intention of reviving the Italian style The steep slopes were made into terraced "floors" and the walkways and stairways that connect the various floors were paved with mosaics of cobblestones. A large water tank enables "English style" lawns. Tall cypress trees screen the garden and box hedges divide its compartments. In the words of horticulturist presenter Monty Don, "[Pinsent] has ruthlessly excluded all colour except green".

About twenty years later, Pinsent would create what would be "[his] last great Italian gardens" (again per Monty Don) when Scott's ex-wife's daughter Iris Origo and her husband Antonio commissioned Pinsent for work on their La Foce estate.

After ownership passed to Harvard, the gardens fell into disrepair until a donation from Lila Acheson Wallace enabled extensive restoration work. As of 2022, this donation keeps funding the garden's upkeep.

=== Setting ===
I Tatti is set in a landscape of great cultural and historic significance. The stony hillsides above it, pockmarked by quarries that supplied the pietra serena for Renaissance Florence, bred masons and sculptors. Nearby Settignano was home to the sculptor Desiderio da Settignano and to the infant Michelangelo, who was sent there to nurse at his family's estate (the Villa Michelangelo). A number of houses in the area are purported to be the refuge of Boccaccio during the plague and thus the setting of The Decameron. Boccaccio's Arcadian poem, Il Ninfale Fiesolano (the Nymph of Fiesole), celebrates the Mensola, a stream flowing through the property. The scarred and over-quarried hillsides were reforested with cypresses by Temple Leader in the late nineteenth century, giving them their present sylvan aspect. Anglo-American villa culture flourished in the area at the turn of the twentieth century.

== Operations ==
“Villa I Tatti, The Harvard Center for Italian Renaissance Studies” is owned and administered by Harvard University, but it is not the typical American student program abroad. Rather, Harvard conceives of Villa I Tatti as an international institution for the advancement of Italian Renaissance studies on the post-doctoral level. Villa I Tatti is one of three centers for advanced research in the humanities belonging to Harvard but located outside of Cambridge, Massachusetts. The others are Dumbarton Oaks, founded in 1940 for Byzantine, pre-Columbian and garden and landscape studies, and the Center for Hellenic Studies, founded in 1962, both in Washington, D.C.

While remaining true to the principal outlines of Berenson's vision, Harvard altered Berenson's intended structure by admitting other fields than art history. History and literature were present from the beginning of the Center's existence as a Harvard research institute, and music followed upon the establishment of a library in music history, funded by gifts from Elizabeth and Gordon Morrill. Harvard's insistence on a mix of fields gives I Tatti its distinctive character. Although “interdisciplinary” was not much in use as a term in 1961, the Center was effectively an interdisciplinary institution from the start.

=== Fellowships ===
Each year, fifteen full-year fellows are chosen from about 110-120 applicants. All have the doctorate at the time of application but are still in the early phase of their careers. Senior distinguished scholars are not eligible for the fellowship, but every year the director invites some who come without stipend as Visiting Professors in Residence. In a given year perhaps a third of the fellowships tend to be in art history, a third in history, and a third in literature and music. There are no quotas of nation. About half of the fellows over almost 50 years have been from the United States and Canada and half from other countries.

In addition to the fifteen year-long fellowships, there are a number of short-term awards aimed at specific groups. A limited number of Mellon Visiting Fellowships, for periods ranging from three to six months, are available each academic year for advanced research in any aspect of the Italian Renaissance. This Fellowship is designed to reach out to Italian Renaissance scholars from areas that have been under-represented at I Tatti, especially those living and working in Asia, Latin America, the Iberian Peninsula and the Mediterranean basin (except Italy and France) and the Islamic countries. There is a similar three-month award, named after I Tatti's third director the Craig Hugh Smyth Fellowship, for Renaissance scholars whose career paths do not normally allow sabbaticals or afford extended summer vacations, such as museum curators.

=== Biblioteca Berenson ===
Berenson described I Tatti as a library with a house attached. Library spaces were added to I Tatti in 1909, 1915, 1923 and 1948–54. The shelf space created during Berenson's lifetime was doubled in 1985 when an additional section, the Paul E. Geier Library, was created in one of the former farm buildings. The wing of the library built by Berenson in 1948–54 was recently renovated by the Roman architectural firm of Garofalo and Miura and renamed in honor of I Tatti's third director and his wife, Craig Hugh Smyth and Barbara Linforth Smyth. Opened in October 2009, the new Smyth Library effectively doubled both the wing's original shelving capacity and the number of workspaces available there.

At his death Berenson left a large personal library of 50,000 volumes, principally dedicated to Mediterranean culture seen through its art and archeology. It also included significant holdings in Chinese, Indian and Near Eastern art, reflecting his collecting interests in those fields. The books were located in a library designed by Cecil Pinsent in 1915, but, also scattered throughout the house. It was not conceived as an interdisciplinary Renaissance library from the beginning but as a reflection of Berenson's personal interests. Italian literature was not strongly represented and music was absent. During the early decades of the institution's life it became a priority to flesh out the library's holdings in areas of Renaissance studies not collected by Berenson himself, and to initiate periodical subscriptions in these fields.

Transformed from a rich but idiosyncratic personal library into a modern research library, the Biblioteca Berenson aims to provide comprehensive research-level coverage of current scholarly publications in all fields of Italian art, architecture, history, science, medicine, society, culture and literature approximately from 1200 to 1650. Research tools are also acquired in adjacent fields such as northern Europe in the same period, medieval studies, and Byzantine and Islamic cultures around the Mediterranean, especially where these relate to Renaissance Italy. It tries to provide modern editions of many of the works of Greek and Latin literature. Currently it holds some 140,000 volumes, which include 106,000 books, 7,000 offprints, 14,000 auction catalogues, and 23,000 periodical volumes. Over 600 periodicals are currently received, most with complete runs from the start of publication.

In 1993 I Tatti joined with three other research libraries in Florence to form a consortium for joint, on-line cataloging, IRIS, which now counts seven member libraries. The Biblioteca Berenson is also one of the 73 libraries that form the Harvard Library and its holdings are accessible through the Harvard on-line catalogue, HOLLIS. In addition, the considerable electronic resources available through the Harvard library are also available at I Tatti, which makes it one of the largest collections of electronic resources in Italy.

==== The Morrill Music Library ====
Established by a gift from F. Gordon Morrill and Elizabeth Morrill, the Morrill Music library has been part of the Biblioteca Berenson since 1966. It covers all western music from the Greeks to the early baroque period, with emphasis on Italian music composed up to 1650. It includes 5,150 scores, 2,500 sound recordings and 7,500 critical studies, monographs, treatises, and reference works; it subscribes to 84 journal titles. There is also an extensive microfilm collection of musical manuscripts and early printed books. The aim is to acquire every published work in Italian musicology for the period up to 1650.

==== The Fototeca Berenson ====
The Fototeca Berenson contained 170,000 photographs at Berenson's death and now contains approximately 250,000 photographs. They are organized topographically, according to Berenson's original scheme: Florence, Siena, Central Italy, Northern Italy, Lombardy, Venice, Southern Italy, and within each school by artist and location. A section of the Fototeca is devoted to images of “homeless” works of art—the term used by Berenson for objects that were once on the art market but whose present locations are now unknown. The versos of many photographs contain handwritten notes by Bernard and Mary Berenson, Nicky Mariano and other art connoisseurs from the first half of the twentieth century. A project to digitize the Fototeca Berenson, making its holdings accessible through the Harvard Libraries’ website, is currently in progress.

Apart from the main collection of photographs on Renaissance painting, there are other minor sections of images representing sculpture, medieval art, Byzantine and early Christian architecture. Of particular importance are the photos taken by the Islamic architectural historian Archibald Creswell and the collection of some 2,000 vintage prints with views of India from the photographers Johnston & Hoffmann.

==== The Berenson Archive ====
Bernard and Mary Berenson cultivated many friendships through letters. Their letters of their correspondents and some of their own letters are kept in the Berenson Archive, together with diaries, notes, drafts of books, personal photographs and other biographical material. The Archive has been enriched since the founding of the Harvard Center by gifts or acquisitions of papers pertaining to Giorgio Castelfranco, Kenneth Clark, Andrea Francalanci, Frederick Hartt, Giuseppe Marchini, Emilio Marcucci, Nicky Mariano, Roberto and Livia Papini, Valeria Piacentini, Laurance P. and Isabel M. Roberts, Stanislaus Eric Steenbok and the Whitall Pearsall Smith family.

=== Collections of Italian painting and Oriental art ===
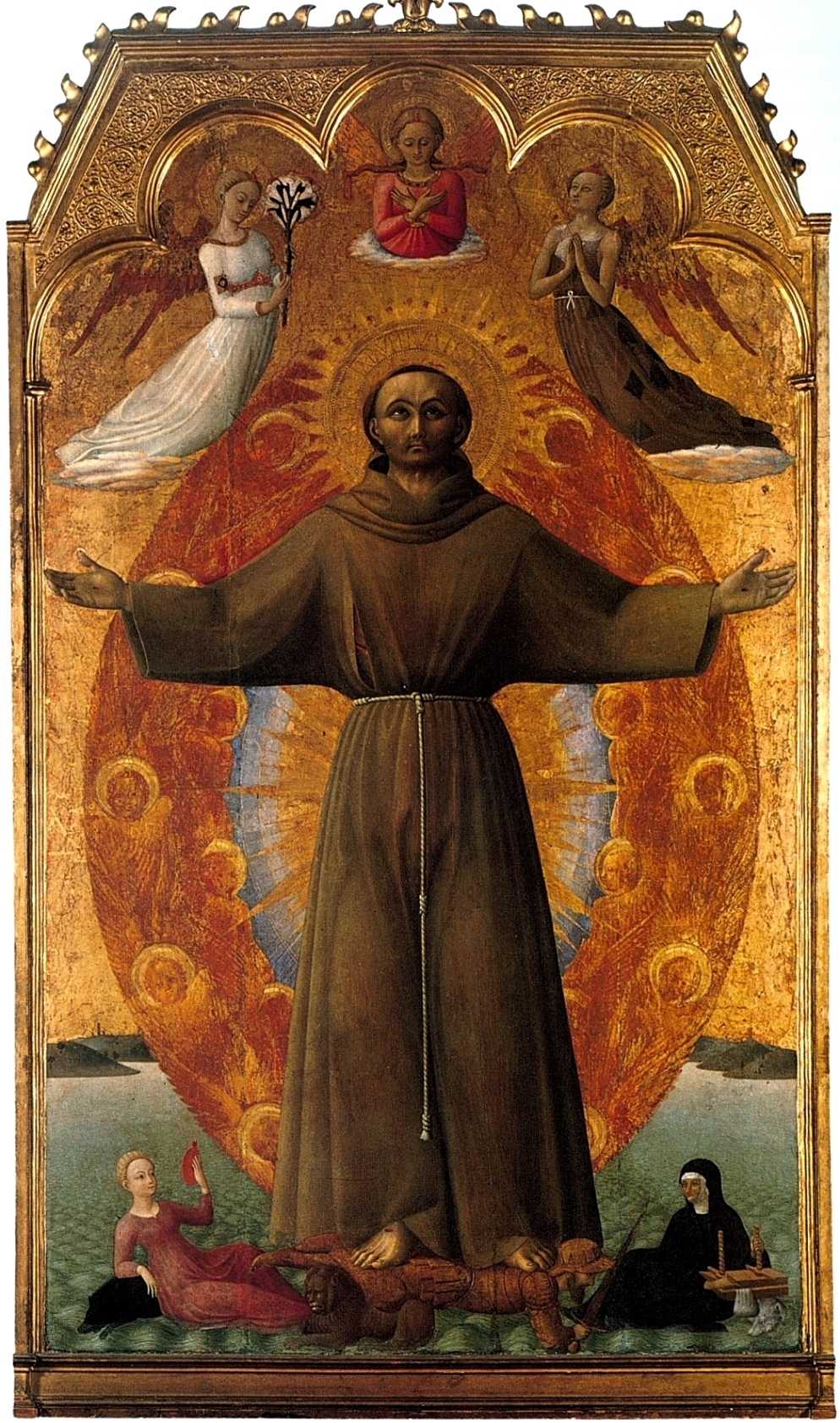
Sassetta's Ectasy of Saint Francis, highlight of Berenson's Italian art collection

I Tatti is home to the art collection of Bernard and Mary Berenson, which includes an important collection of about 100 late Medieval and Renaissance Italian paintings. The painting collection was formed between ca. 1900 and ca. 1920, with few additions thereafter. Shortly before his death in 1959, Berenson donated his Madonna and Child by Ambrogio Lorenzetti to the Uffizi, which owned two smaller paintings that originally came from the same dismembered altarpiece. The most famous works in the collection, and among the first to be acquired by the Berensons, are three panels depicting St. Francis in Glory, The Blessed Rainieri Rasini, and St. John the Baptist coming from the Sansepolcro Altarpiece by the Sienese painter Sassetta (painted 1437–1444). A comprehensive modern catalogue of the Berenson Collection of Italian paintings is currently in preparation.

Bernard Berenson also formed a smaller but important collection of Oriental art, including works from China, Japan, Tibet, Thailand, Java, Cambodia and Burma. Berenson also assembled a small but significant collection of Near Eastern manuscripts, including an illuminated page from the renowned fourteenth-century Great Mongol (formerly Demotte) Shahnama.

=== Scholarly Programs and Publications ===
I Tatti's scholarly programs provide a special forum for discussion, and have become increasingly crucial to the Center's mission of creating bridges with its sister institutions and the international scholarly community. There is also an active program of public lectures by outside scholars and shop-talks by fellows. In addition, I Tatti organizes and hosts one or two symposia or giornate di studio each semester which bring scholars from other countries.

Each year I Tatti hosts the Bernard Berenson Lectures, a series of three interconnected lectures on a given theme, presented by a senior scholar of worldwide renown in the field of Renaissance studies. Each cycle of Berenson Lectures is published by Harvard University Press. In addition to publication of the acts of various conferences, select monographs, and the annual Berenson Lectures, there is an annual journal for scholarly essays on Renaissance subjects in English and Italian, I Tatti Studies, which was founded in 1985.

Recently a series of monographs on Renaissance history has been initiated with Harvard University Press, the I Tatti Studies in Italian Renaissance History, under the general editorship of Edward Muir.

Under the editorship of James Hankins of Harvard, Harvard University Press also publishes the I Tatti Renaissance Library, which is modeled on the Loeb Classical Library and aims to publish the major literary, historical, philosophical and scientific works of the Italian Renaissance written in Latin with modern English translation on facing pages. Forty-one volumes have appeared to date and about 120 more are envisaged in the course of the next decade. The series will put this “lost continent” of Latin literature within the reach of scholars and students in many fields.

Both the fellowship and the scholarly events have been enhanced by the completion late in 2010 of the Deborah Loeb Brice Loggiato, site of fellows' studies and a small auditorium, the Gould Hall, on the designed by Charles Brickbauer.

=== Music at Villa I Tatti ===
The concerts of early music organized by the Morrill Music Library are an integral part of the academic activities at Villa I Tatti. They range from intimate performances for the I Tatti community, often on period instruments, to those performed by early music groups for a wider audience. The series Early Music at I Tatti, established in 2002 by Joseph Connors with Kathryn Bosi, offers twice-yearly concerts performed by musicians of international renown. These aim to present to the Florentine community innovative programs of early music centering on a particular theme or idea, such as an examination of the concept of humor in Renaissance music (Early Music at I Tatti, II), the role of music in medieval thought (Early Music at I Tatti, I) or the traditional repertoire deriving from the therapeutic effects of music on the bite of the tarantula spider in southern Italy (Early Music at I Tatti, XII). Many offer repertoires which are rarely heard in Italy today, ranging from works by one of the earliest known Florentine composers, Paolo da Firenze (fl. 1390–1425) (Early Music at I Tatti, VII), to music written for the Habsburg court at Vienna in the mid seventeenth century by Italian composers favored by the Austrian emperors (Early Music at I Tatti, IX). Contemporary music is sometimes an integral part of the programs: Early Music at I Tatti, IV juxtaposed Petrarch settings by Renaissance composers with settings by the English composer Gavin Bryars, while Early Music at I Tatti, VIII focused on the fruitful relationship which has developed between contemporary composers and performers of early music. Both concerts featured world premieres of new works written for the occasion.

== Directors of Villa I Tatti ==
- Kenneth B. Murdock 1961–1964
- Myron P. Gilmore 1964–1973
- Craig Hugh Smyth 1973–1985
- Louise George Clubb 1985–1988
- Walter J. Kaiser 1988–2002
- Joseph Connors 2002–2010
- Lino Pertile 2010–2015
- Alina Payne 2015–present

== Villa I Tatti fellows ==
Notable appointees include Gauvin Alexander Bailey, Margaret Bent, Derek Bok, Gene Brucker, Howard Burns, Giulio Calvi, Joseph Connors, Janet Cox-Rearick, Georges Didi-Huberman, Caroline Elam, Sydney Joseph Freedberg, Carlo Ginzburg; James Hankins, Frederick Hartt, William Hood, Deborah Howard, John W. O'Malley, Stephen Orgel, Ada Palmer, Alina Payne, Alan Perreiah, Marcia B. Hall, Ingrid D. Rowland, Patricia Rubin, Craig Hugh Smyth, Marco Spallanzani, Bette Talvacchia, Richard Trexler, and Donald Weinstein.

== See also ==
- Italian Studies
- Italian Renaissance
- Harvard University

== Bibliography ==
- Myron Gilmore, “Villa I Tatti, The Harvard University Center for Italian Renaissance Studies: The First Ten Years”, The Harvard Library Bulletin, XIX, no. 1, January 1971, pp. 99–109; Italian version as “I Tatti a dieci anni dalla morte di Bernard Berenson”, Antichità Viva, VIII, no. 6, 1969, pp. 48–52.
- Nicky Mariano, Forty Years with Berenson, London: Hamish Hamilton, 1966. With an introduction by Kenneth Clark.
- Luisa Vertova, “I Tatti”, Antichità Viva, VIII, no. 6, 1969, pp. 53–78.
- Ernest Samuels, Bernard Berenson: The Making of a Connoisseur, Cambridge MA, 1979; Bernard Berenson: The Making of a Legend, Cambridge MA, 1987.
- Laurance P. Roberts, The Bernard Berenson Collection of Oriental Art at Villa I Tatti, New York, 1991.
- William Weaver, A Legacy of Excellence: The Story of Villa I Tatti, New York, 1997.
- Villa I Tatti, The Harvard University Center for Italian Renaissance Studies: Forty Years, 1961/62-2001/02, Florence, 2002.
- Joseph Connors and Louis A. Waldman, ed., Bernard Berenson: Formation and Heritage Florence. 2014.
- Carl Brandon Stehlke and Machtelt Brüggen Israëls, eds., The Bernard and Mary Berenson Collection of European Paintings at I Tatti, Milan and Florence, 2015. A short guide to this volume from I Tatti Studies 2016.
- Tiffany L Johnston, Villa I Tatti: Mary Berenson's "Golden Urn" Arcadia, Centro Di. Florence, 2024.
