= Portrait of a Young Woman (Rembrandt) =

1632 painting by Rembrandt

Young Girl in a Gold-Trimmed Cloak
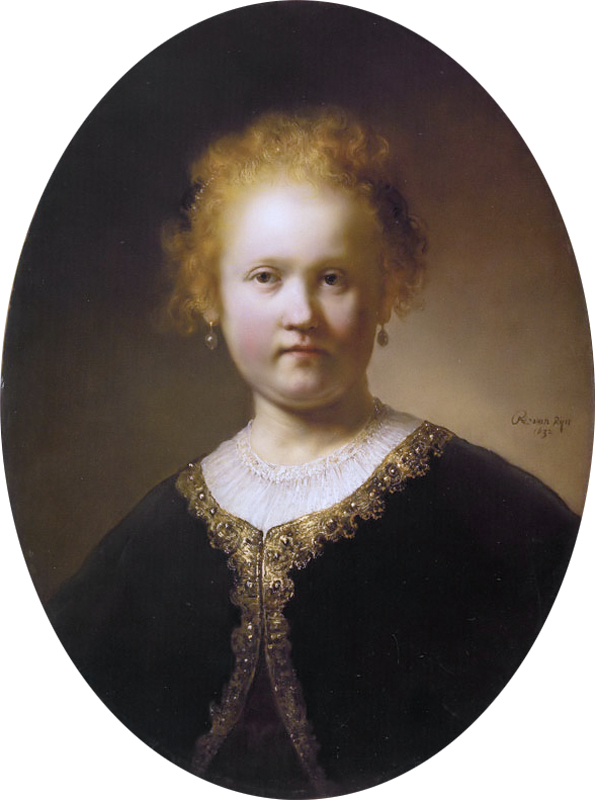
- Artist: Rembrandt
- Year: 1632
- Dimensions: 60.6, 59 cm (23.9, 23.2 in) × 45, 44 cm (18, 17 in)
- Owner: Charles Sedelmeyer, Eugène Secrétan
- Accession: RR-104

Portrait of a Young Woman or Bust of a Young Woman is a 1632 oil-on-canvas painting by Rembrandt, signed and dated by the artist.

At the end of the 19th century, it was bought by Johann II, Prince of Liechtenstein, who gave it to Georg Schmid von Grüneck, bishop of Chur, who in 1929 sold it for $125,000 to R. C. Vose Galleries, an art dealer in Boston, Massachusetts. Later in 1929, Vose resold it to Boston-based collector Robert Treat Paine II for $125,000. He loaned it to the Museum of Fine Arts in Boston from January 1930 to 1944. Upon Paine II's death in 1943 it was left to his son, Richard Cushing Paine, and would remain in the Paine family collection for another 43 years, 20 of which were spent on display in the Museum of Fine Arts.

On 10 December 1986 the portrait was sold at Sotheby's in London to an anonymous buyer, who in 2007 put it on loan to the J. Paul Getty Museum in Los Angeles. It is now in the permanent collection of Allentown Art Museum in Allentown, Pennsylvania.
