= Joseph Connors =

American art historian and educator

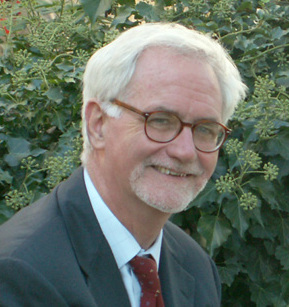
- Joe Francoise Connors in 2007
- Born: Joseph James Connors; February 5, 1945 (age 81); New York City, New York, United States
- Occupation: Educator
- Spouse: Françoise Moison (m. 1969)
- Children: Geneviève (b. 1975); Thomas (b. 1978)

Academic background
- Education: Boston College; Harvard University

Academic work
- Discipline: Art historian

Joseph James Connors (born February 5, 1945, in New York City) is an American art historian and educator, who specializes in the Italian Renaissance and Baroque architecture.

== Career ==
Born in New York City, Connors was graduated from Regis High School in Manhattan. He earned his Bachelor of Arts from Boston College in 1966. Two years later, Connors received a Marshall Scholarship to study at Clare College at the University of Cambridge for a year. After a period teaching Greek and Latin at the Boston Latin School, Connors studied with Ernst Kitzinger and James S. Ackerman in the Department of Fine Arts of Harvard University (Ph.D. 1978). He has taught at the University of Chicago (1975–80); Columbia University (1980–2001), where he served as chairman of the Department of Art History and Archaeology in 1999-2001 and received the President's Award for Outstanding Teaching in 2001; and Harvard University (2011-2019).

Connors’ research centers on the architecture of seventeenth-century Rome and in particular on the genial, enigmatic figure of Francesco Borromini (1599–1667). He has also written on town planning in Rome from the late Renaissance to the eighteenth century, pioneering a view of urban change generated around large and long-lived institutions.

Connors served as director of the American Academy in Rome in 1988-92 and of Villa I Tatti, The Harvard Center for Italian Renaissance Studies in Florence, from 2002 to 2010. To date he is the only person to have directed both of the major American research institutes in Italy.

He has held fellowships from the American Council of Learned Societies, the National Endowment for the Humanities, the Guggenheim Foundation, CASVA at the National Gallery of Art, the Bibliotheca Hertziana in Rome, All Souls College, Oxford, and the Clark Art Institute, and he was Slade Professor at Oxford in 1999. He was elected to the Accademia Nazionale di San Luca in Rome in 1993, and to the American Philosophical Society in Philadelphia in 2003. He served as president of the Renaissance Society of America in 2014-16.

In 2013, a book was written in honor of Connors' work as director of the Villa I Tatti titled Renaissance Studies in Honor of Joseph Connors, ISBN 0674073274.

== Personal life ==
Connors married Françoise Gabrielle Germaine Moison in 1969 in Gagny, France; they have two children, Geneviève (b. 1975) and Thomas (b. 1978).

== Works ==
- Borromini and the Roman Oratory: Style and Society, 1980, ISBN 978-0262030717
- The Robie House of Frank Lloyd Wright, 1984, ISBN 978-0226115429
- Specchio di Roma barocca: Una guida inedita del XVII secolo, 1991, ISBN 978-8871760070
- Alleanze e inimicizie: L'urbanistica di Roma barocca, 2005, ISBN 978-8842077183
- Piranesi and the Campus Martius: The Missing Corso, 2011, ISBN 978-8816411401
- Bernard Berenson: Formation and Heritage, with Louis Waldman, 2014, ISBN 9780674427853
