= HIV/AIDS public health campaigns in Italy =

Since the arrival of the HIV/AIDS epidemic in Italy in the 1980s, 120,000 cases of people testing positive for HIV have been registered with the Ministry of Health. Every year, 4,000 new infections are registered. Since the 1980s, 58,400 diagnoses of AIDS have been recorded, of which 35,300 have resulted in mortality. From the height of the epidemic in 1995 to today, the number of registered cases of AIDS has fallen from 5,600 to 1,200. The decline in incidence of AIDS is directly attributable to the efficacy of combined antiretroviral drug therapy, which has resulted in an increase in the number of people living with the diagnosis. The effectiveness of the drug therapy means that the 23,000 Italians diagnosed with HIV have better chances of not progressing to AIDS.

== Transmission ==
HIV transmission in Italy has changed over the years from primarily drug-related transmission to primarily sex-related transmission. In 1997, about 60% of registered cases of people infected with HIV were drug-related, 20% were transmitted through heterosexual contact, and 15% through homo- or bisexual contact. In 2007, ten years later, the number of drug-related transmissions has decreased to about 28%, while heterosexual transmission has increased to about 44% percent and homo- or bisexual transmission has increased to 22%.

== The Italian Ministry of Health ==
=== Early campaigns ===
==== Carlo Donat-Cattin ====
Though HIV/AIDS arrived in Italy in the early 1980s, no widespread Ministry of Health campaigns related to the disease emerged until after 1988. This is, in part, due to the attitudes and beliefs held by Italy's Minister of Health at the time, Carlo Donat-Cattin. Cattin rejected sexual education campaigns for public schools, fearing what discussion of anal sex would entail. Furthermore, Cattin refused to speak with organizations of homosexuals because he did not want to speak with “perverts”. Cattin has even been quoted in saying “from now on, only people who go looking for it, catch AIDS”.

==== Francesco De Lorenzo ====
When Italy's Minister of Health changed from Donat Cattin to Francesco De Lorenzo in mid 1989, the official attitudes of the Ministry towards the HIV/AIDS epidemic changed as well. A new series of public health commercials for television was produced. These commercials provided the Italian public with clear and direct information about the prevention of transmission of HIV. A particular commercial shows a man and woman moving around each other, while a narrator explains that HIV/AIDS is not transmitted by kissing, shaking hands or sharing silverware. The narrator continues to say that the infection is instead transmitted through sexual intercourse with a partner that already has the infection, and so it is best to avoid intercourse with unknown partners—but if intercourse is to occur, it is best to use a condom. The narrator also explains that HIV is transmitted through infected blood, and so one should not use contaminated needles. This commercial, produced under the auspices of De Lorenzo, was clear and informative. It did not veer from the use of the word “condom,” a word that would soon become taboo in discussing the epidemic in Italy.

=== HIV/AIDS Awareness Post De Lorenzo ===
After De Lorenzo stepped down from his post as Minister of Health in the early 1990s, it seemed that public awareness of HIV/AIDS diminished. One potential reason is the decreasing press interest in the epidemic. Due to the decline in the sensational nature of the topic, press coverage declined. The height of the HIV/AIDS epidemic in Italy (1995) occurred precisely during the time in which public awareness was at its lowest.

=== In the 21st century ===
A reemergence of HIV/AIDS public health campaigns on behalf of Italy's Ministry of Health occurred in 2002. The Ministry established the objectives of raising awareness, avoidance of risky behavior and promotion of HIV testing for their 2002-2003 campaign. Their target population was young people, women and the Italian population aged 14–65, especially those living in urban environments. The Ministry used TV, radio, cinema, printed periodicals and events as means to promote their objectives, with the slogan of the year being “AIDS is Fought Together”. Though the implications of the new campaign were very powerful, clear and direct information about condom use as a preventative measure is absent. The 2002-2003 campaign instead focused on a notion of solidarity.

The Ministry of Health's campaign against HIV/AIDS in 2004 was similar to that of 2002–2003. The slogan of the year, “Love for ourselves is the best protection from AIDS”, again avoids direct information about preventative measures, including condom use. In 2005, the Ministry of Health did not focus on HIV/AIDS as a main prerogative, as it is absent from their public health campaign records.

In 2006 information about the increase in rates of sexual transmission and the decrease in rates of drug-related transmission became more apparent. The Ministry of Health's discourse then turned more towards openly concentrating on preventing both homo- and heterosexual transmission. This shift towards acknowledgement of homosexual as well as heterosexual activities is reflective of a change in attitude in Italian society.

The most recent Ministry of Health campaign has finally included the word condom in its main publicity. A television commercial produced on behalf of the Ministry and directed by Francesca Archibugi uses the phrase “Respect life, respect yourself and others, use a condom and don’t take risks in love” as its main counsel. The commercial depicts a young heterosexual couple outside of a pharmacy in an airport. The two then enter the pharmacy to buy condoms and then go to catch their flight. Though the cinematography is simple, the narration that occurs throughout the commercial is impactful. Ambra Angiolini, an Italian celebrity recites, “a small act of responsibility can prevent a terrible disease”. She continues by saying that in Italy every year there are about 4,000 new cases of HIV. She finishes the commercial by advising viewers to use a condom [to/and] prevent transmission of HIV as well as other sexually transmitted infections [cite-MOH]. After a long period of avoidance of the word “condom,” the Italian Ministry of Health has finally reintroduced promotion of prophylactic use as a method of HIV/AIDS prevention.
