= Palazzo dell'Arte dei Beccai =

Building in Florence, in Italy

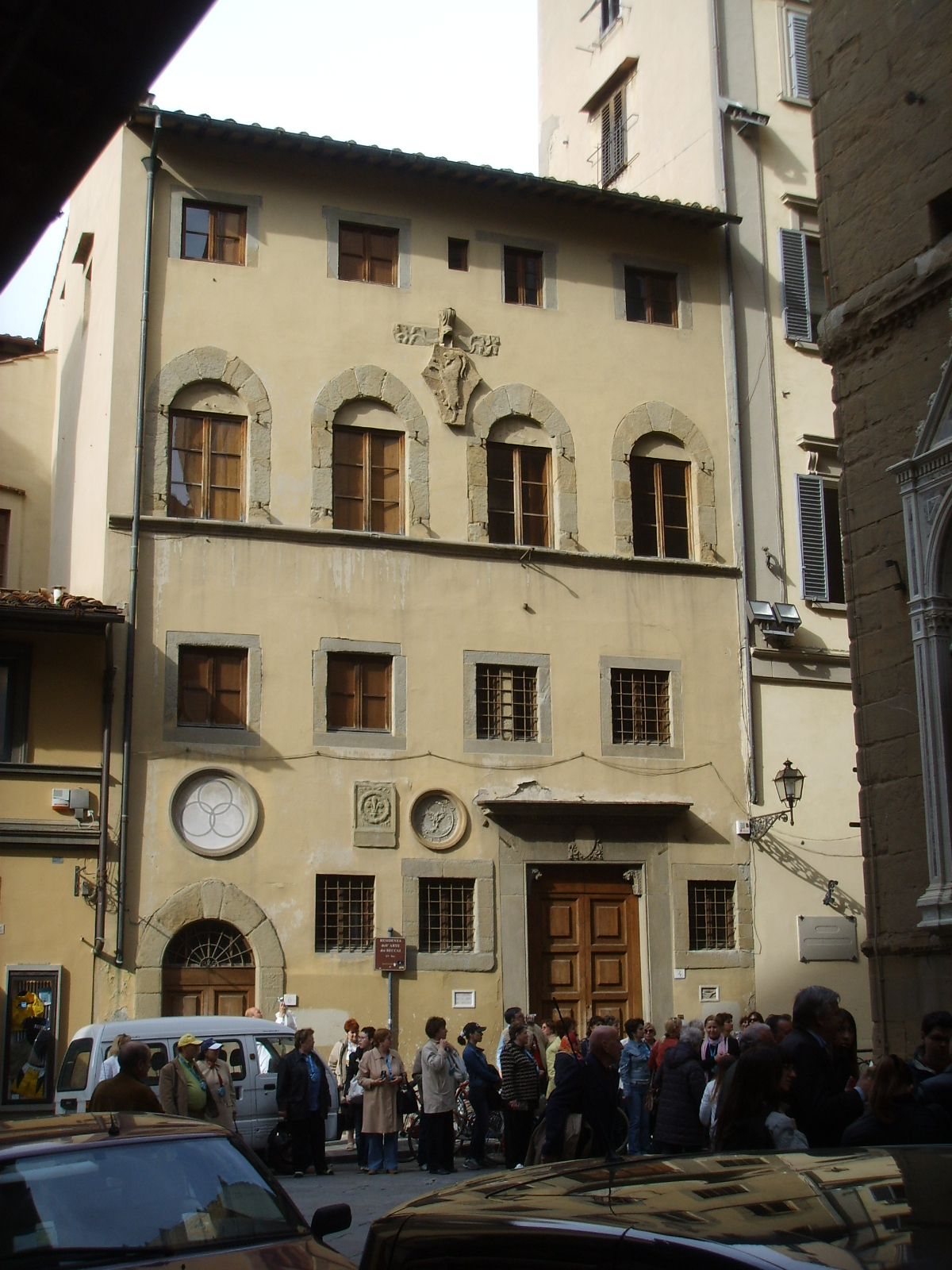
- Façade of the Palazzo dell'Arte dei Beccai
- Interactive map of the Palazzo dell'Arte dei Beccai area

General information
- Location: via Orsanmichele 4, Florence, Italy
- Coordinates: 43.77098°N 11.25485°E
- Current tenants: Accademia Fiorentina delle Arti del Disegno
- Owner: Italian State

The Palazzo dell'Arte dei Beccai or Residenza dell'Arte dei Beccai is a fourteenth-century building in Florence, in Tuscany in central Italy. It faces the Orsanmichele, once a grain market, later the church of the guilds of Florence. It has had many occupants, including the Arte dei Beccai – 'guild of butchers' – from which its name derives. Since 1974 it has housed the Accademia Fiorentina delle Arti del Disegno, a learned academy of artists.

== History ==
The Palazzo dell'Arte dei Beccai was built in the fourteenth century on the site of houses of the Macci family. It was initially used by the Capitani di Orsanmichele. It was home to the Arte dei Beccai until 1534, and then, from 1583, to the Arte dei Fabbricanti e Legnaioli, the guild of masons and carpenters, into which the Arte dei Beccai had by then been merged.

From 1772 it was used by the customs authority of the Grand Duchy of Tuscany, and from 1789 passed into the hands of the Congregazione di Carità di San Giovanni Battista, a charitable institution. From the 1940s it was home to the Ente Comunale di Assistenza, a branch of the city administration. In the late 1960s it was purchased by the Banco di Sicilia. It was by then in very poor condition.

Restoration was begun in the early 1970s, and from 1974 the building, now the property of the State, became the home of the Accademia Fiorentina delle Arti del Disegno.

== The building ==
The façade is largely unchanged from its fourteenth-century appearance, although some windows have undergone later modification. The piano nobile is marked by four large arched windows. Above them are the arms of the Arte dei Beccai, a long-horned billy-goat, the Italian: becco from which the name of the guild derives; this work has been attributed to Donatello. Lower on the façade are other crests, the giglio or iris of Florence and the three interlocking wreaths of the Accademia Fiorentina delle Arti del Disegno.

In 1901 the building was included in a listing of buildings to be considered part of the national heritage, compiled by the Direzione Generale delle Antichità e Belle Arti, or "general directorate of antiquities and fine arts".

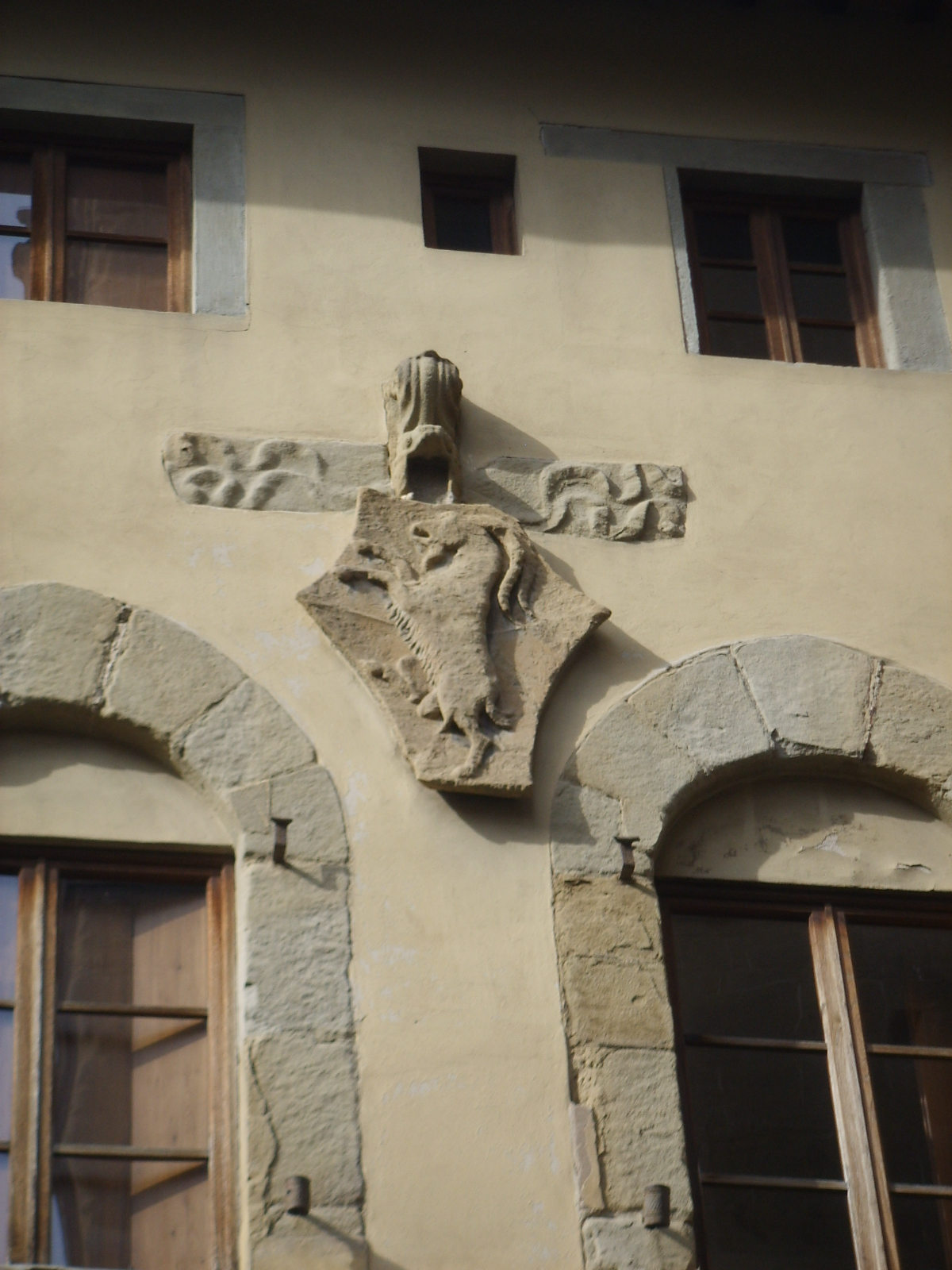
Façade: the arms of the Arte dei Beccai

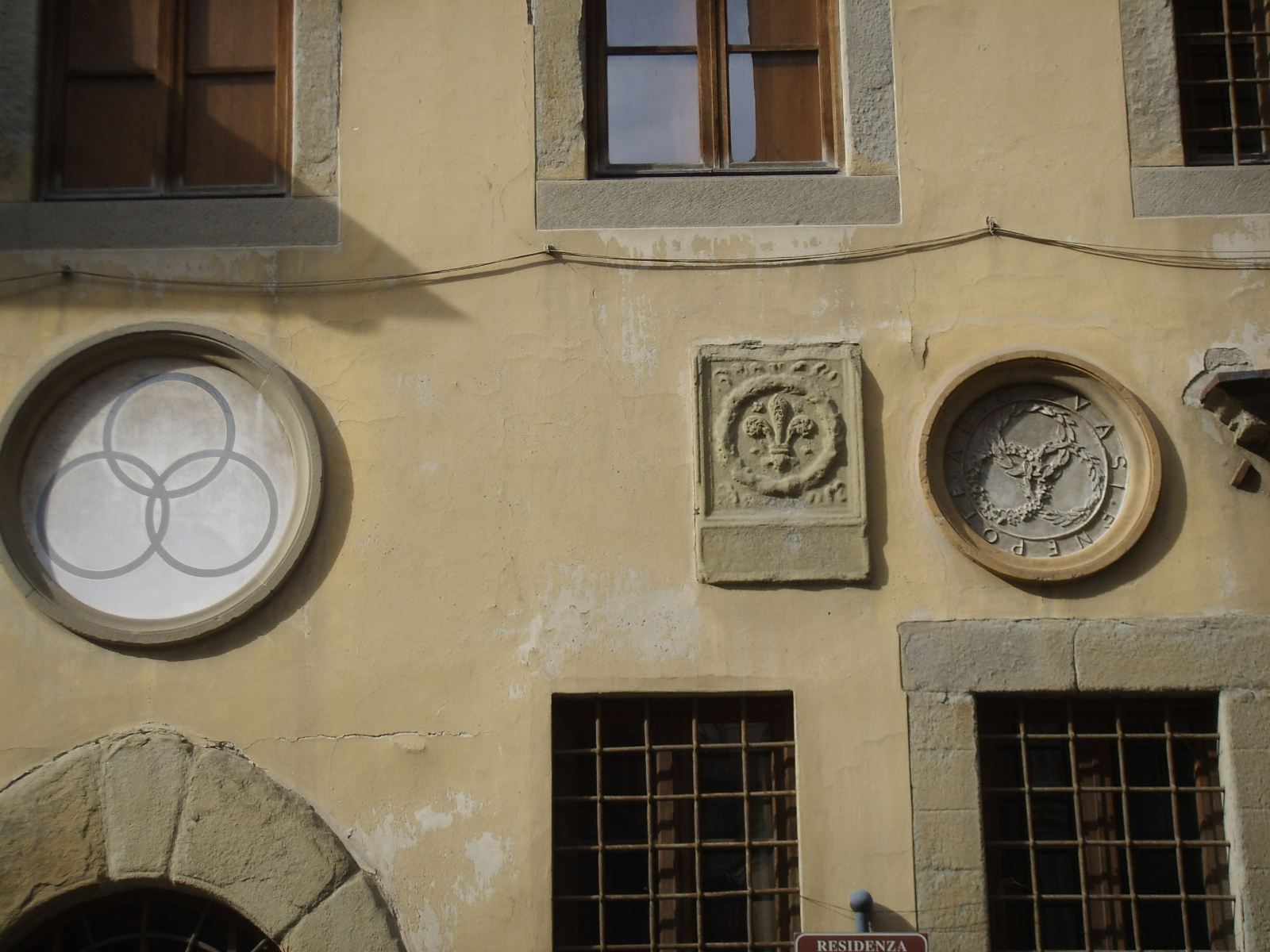
Façade: other crests

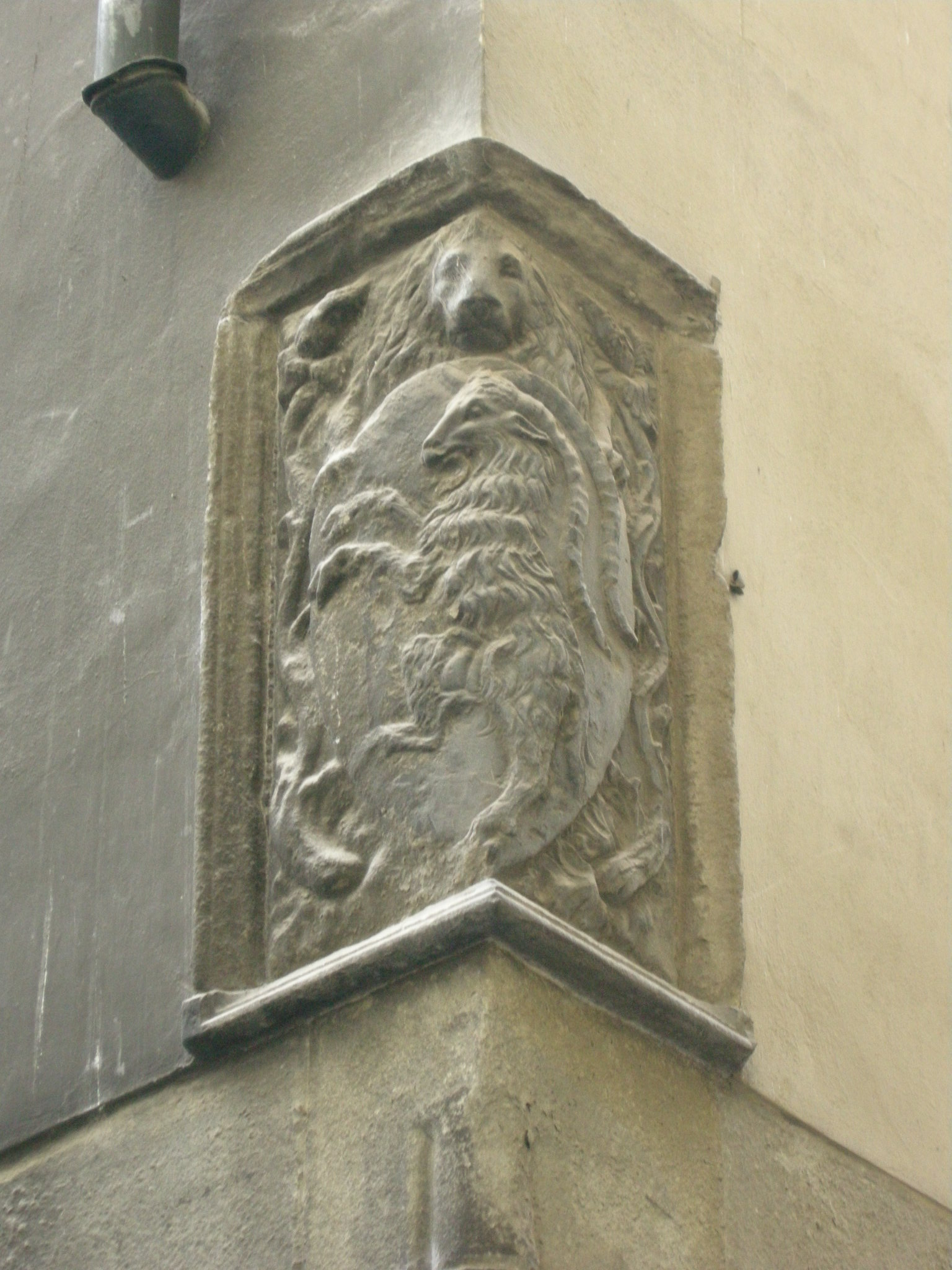
Arms of the Arte dei Beccai on the corner facing Piazza dei Tre Re
