= Guido Beltramini =

Italian historian, museum director and curator (born 1961)

Guido Beltramini (born in Schio (Vicenza), April 28, 1961) is an Italian architectural historian and a curator.

== Biography ==
Guido Beltramini has been Director of the Centro Internazionale di Studi di Architettura Andrea Palladio in Vicenza, Italy since 1991 and he has been Director of the Palladio Museum since its foundation in 2012. He is an expert in Renaissance architecture, especially the work of Andrea Palladio and his followers, and has published widely on these subjects. He has also curated several exhibitions, which in recent years have also been a means of further developing his Renaissance studies and in particular the network of relations between writers and artists.

In 2008 he has been Craig Hugh Smyth Visiting Fellow at Villa I Tatti, Florence; in 2009-2010 Kress Foundation Fellow at the Italian Academy for Advanced Studies at Columbia University, New York, and in 2011 Mellon Senior Fellow at the Canadian Centre for Architecture, Montreal. Beltramini has taught as visiting professor at the University of Ferrara and University of Milan, and in 2017 he has been Andrew W. Mellon Inaugural Visiting Professor at the V&A Research Institute and Royal College PhD program "History of Design". In 2015 - 2020 he has been visiting lecturer at the Graduate School of Design, Harvard University, Cambdridge (Mass.), Since 2015 he has been member of the Board of Trustees of the Canadian Centre for Architecture and since 2012 member of the International Advisory Panel of Architectural History. Journal of the Society of Architectural Historians of Great Britain.Since 2022 he has been member of the Faculty of Architecture of the British School at Rome (https://bsr.ac.uk/).

== Selected publications ==
In addition to numerous papers and articles, the principal books he has written or co-edited include:

- The Elusive Face of Andrea Palladio (Milan 2017)
- Storia dell’architettura nel Veneto. Il Cinquecento (with D. Battilotti, E. Demo, W. Panciera, Venice 2015)
- Jefferson and Palladio. Constructing a New World (with F. Lenzo, Milan 2015)
- The Private Palladio (Zurich 2012, Berlin 2009, Venice 2008)
- Palladio and the Architecture of Battle (Venice and New York 2009)
- Carlo Scarpa e la scultura del Novecento (Venice 2009)
- Palladio (with H. Burns, Venice and London 2009)
- Carlo Scarpa. Architecture and Design (with Italo Zannier, Venice and New York 2007)
- Vincenzo Scamozzi. 1548–1616 (with F. Barbieri, Venice 2003).

== Exhibitions ==
Beltramini has curated exhibitions for the Palladio Museum in Vicenza; the Venice Architecture Biennale; the Royal Academy of Arts, London; the Morgan Library and Museum, New York; the National Building Museum, Washington; and the Canadian Centre for Architecture. He has recently completed a trilogy of Renaissance exhibitions: Pietro Bembo e l’invenzione del Rinascimento, 2013 (with D. Gasparotto and A. Tura, Padua, Palazzo del Monte di Pietà), Aldo Manuzio. Il rinascimento di Venezia, 2016 (with D. Gasparotto, Venice, Gallerie dell'Accademia), and Cosa vedeva Ariosto quando chiudeva gli occhi, 2016–17 (Ferrara, Palazzo dei Diamanti).

=== Selected exhibitions ===
- The mystery of Palladio's face, exhibition curated by Guido Beltramini. Guido Beltramini. Vicenza, Palladio Museum, 3 December 2016 - 18 June 2017.
- Found in Translation: Palladio – Jefferson, A narrative by Filippo Romano. Exhibition curated by Guido Beltramini, Centro Internazionale di Studi di Architettura Andrea Palladio. Canadian Centre for Architecture, 8 October 2014 to 15 February 2015.
- Palladio at Work: An annotated exhibition. Exhibition curated by Guido Beltramini, Centro Internazionale di Studi di Architettura Andrea Palladio, in collaboration with Charles Hind, RIBA Architectural Library. Canadian Centre for Architecture, 3 March 2011 to 22 May 2011.
- Palladio and His Legacy: A Transatlantic Journey. The Morgan Library and Museum, 2 April 2010 - 1 August 2010
