= Accademia delle Arti del Disegno =

Academy of artists in Florence, Italy

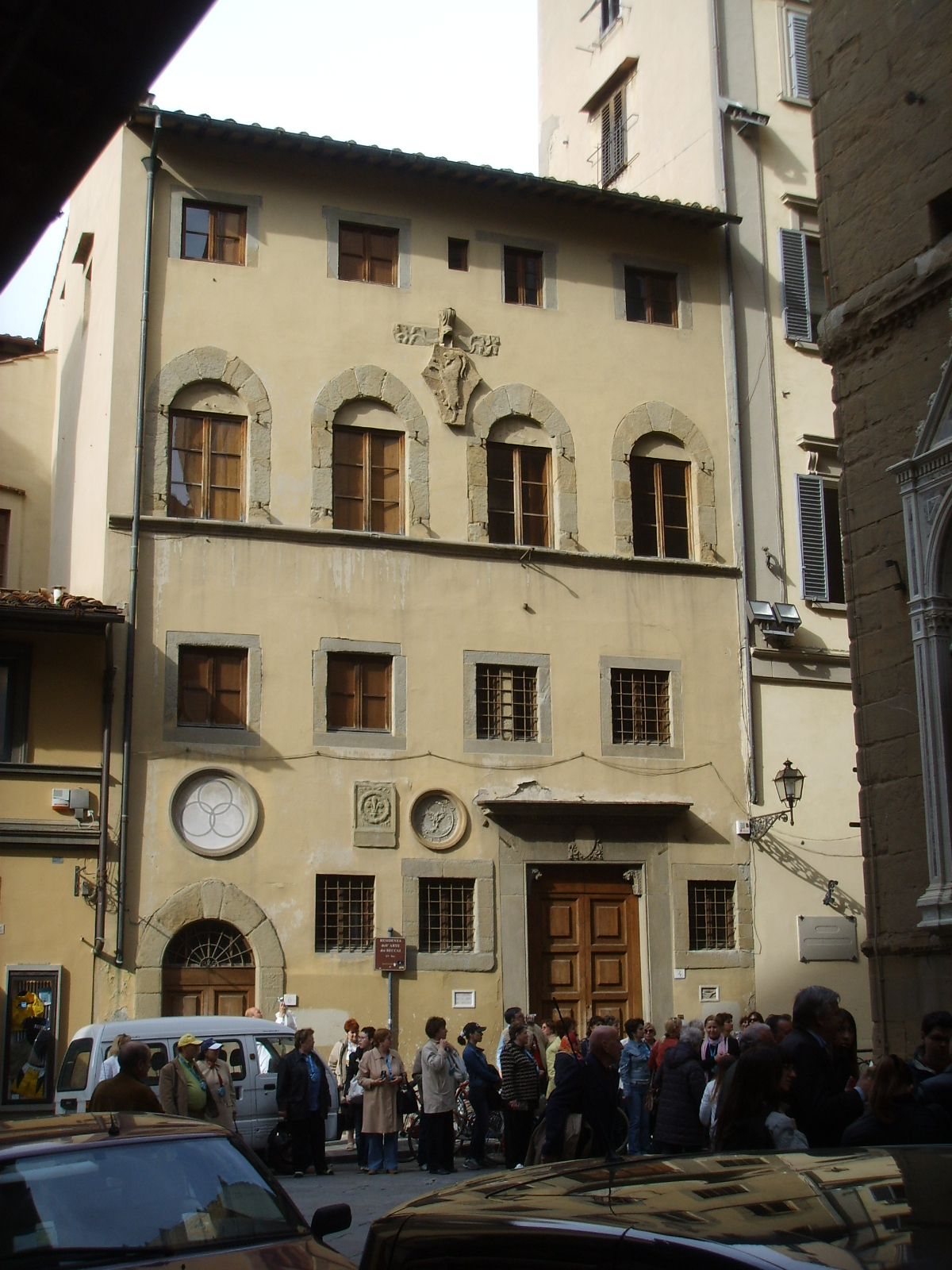
- The Palazzo dell'Arte dei Beccai, headquarters of the Accademia
- Predecessor: Accademia e compagnia delle arti del disegno (1563–1784)
- Formation: 1873
- Type: academy of artists
- Legal status: Statute dated 17 May 1978
- Purpose: Promotion and diffusion of the arts, protection and conservation of art and cultural heritage worldwide
- Headquarters: Palazzo dell'Arte dei Beccai
- Location: via Orsanmichele 4, Florence, Italy
- Coordinates: 43°46′16″N 11°15′17″E
- Region served: Italy, whole world
- Main organ: Consiglio di Presidenza (presidential council)
- Website: aadfi.it

The Accademia delle Arti del Disegno ("Academy of the Arts of Drawing") is an academy of artists in Florence, in Italy. It was founded on 13 January 1563 by Cosimo I de' Medici, under the influence of Giorgio Vasari. It was initially known as the Accademia e Compagnia delle Arti del Disegno ("Academy and Company of the Arts of Drawing") and consisted of two parts: the company was a kind of guild for all working artists, while the academy was for more eminent artistic figures of the Medici court, and supervised artistic production in the Duchy of Florence.

Among those who have been members are Michelangelo, Lazzaro Donati, Francesco da Sangallo, Bronzino, Benvenuto Cellini, Giorgio Vasari, Bartolomeo Ammannati, and Giambologna. Most members of the Accademia were male; Artemisia Gentileschi was the first woman to be admitted.

In the twenty-first century its declared purposes are the promotion and diffusion of the arts, and the protection and conservation of cultural heritage worldwide. It organises conferences, concerts, book presentations and exhibitions, and elects noted artists from all over the world to honorary membership.

== History ==
=== The first Accademia ===
The first Accademia delle Arti del Disegno was founded by Cosimo I de' Medici on 13 January 1563, under the influence of Giorgio Vasari. It was initially named the Accademia e Compagnia delle Arti del Disegno, or "academy and company of the arts of drawing", and was made up of two parts: the company was a kind of guild for all working artists, while the academy was for more eminent artistic personalities of Cosimo's court, and supervised artistic production in Tuscany. It was later called the Accademia delle Arti del Disegno. At first, the academy met in the cloisters of the Santissima Annunziata.

In 1784 Pietro Leopoldo, Grand Duke of Tuscany, combined all the schools of drawing in Florence into one institution, the new Accademia di Belle Arti di Firenze, or academy of fine arts. The Accademia delle Arti del Disegno was thus suppressed and transformed into the Collegio dei Professori dell'Accademia.

=== The modern Accademia ===
In the re-organisation following the Unification of Italy, the Collegio dei Professori dell'Accademia delle Arti del Disegno was again separated from the Regia Accademia di Belle Arti di Firenze in 1873; it became fully independent of it in 1937, and was at the same time divided into three schools or classes, of architecture, of painting, and of sculpture and engraving. Sculpture and painting became separate classes under a new statute of 1953. Since 1971 the Accademia has occupied Palazzo dell'Arte dei Beccai, in via Orsanmichele. The present statute of the organisation was published by decree of the President of the Republic of Italy, and is dated 17 May 1978.

== Organisation and membership ==
Since the statute of 1978 the Accademia delle Arti del Disegno has been divided into five classes: painting, sculpture, architecture, history of art and humanities and sciences. There are four classes of membership: emeritus, ordinary, correspondent and honorary.

Notable members of the Accademia include Sandro Chia, Hans Erni and Anselm Kiefer in painting; Arnaldo Pomodoro, Giuliano Vangi and Dani Karavan in sculpture; Massimo Carmassi and Paolo Portoghesi in architecture; David Whitehouse in history of art; and Salvatore Accardo and Carlo Ginzburg in humanities and sciences.

=== Honorary members ===
The Accademia awards the title of Accademico d'Onore, or honorary member, to those it considers notable in culture and the arts. It lists 138 such honorary members. Among them are Andrea Branzi, Daniel Buren, Fernando Caruncho, Andrea Claudio Galluzzo, Herman Hertzberger, Michael Hirst, Jasper Johns, Gina Lollobrigida, Pierre Rosenberg, Edoardo Vesentini, Alessandro Vezzosi, Louis Waldman and the Pritzker Prize winners Robert Venturi and Renzo Piano.

Past Accademici d'Onore include Giulio Andreotti, Alberto Ronchey, the Nobel Prize winner Rita Levi-Montalcini, and Jørn Utzon.
