= Michael Hirst (art historian) =

British art historian (1933–2017)

David Michael Geoffrey Hirst, FBA (5 September 1933 – 14 December 2017), commonly known as Michael Hirst, was an art historian and an expert on Italian Renaissance art. He was Professor of the History of Art at the Courtauld Institute of Art from 1991 to 1997.

== Biography ==
David Michael Geoffrey Hirst was born on 5 September 1933 and studied at New College, Oxford, and the Courtauld Institute of Art. Lecturer, Reader and Professor of Courtauld Institute of Art, University of London, and a Fellow of the Academy since 1983, Hirst has been one of the foremost specialists on the drawings of Michelangelo. Indeed, such was his international standing in the world of Michelangelo studies that he was made a member of the Pontifical Commission for the Restoration of the Sistine Chapel's ceiling in 1987, and the following year curated an exhibition on Michelangelo as Draftsman for the National Gallery of Art in Washington.

He has made a signal contribution to knowledge and understanding of sixteenth-century Italian art, devoting most of his scholarly publications to the life and works of Michelangelo. His studies of the Florentine master have shaped a generation of art historians and constitute a point of reference for Renaissance art history in general. His book on Michelangelo’s drawings is widely considered to be the most perceptive study on the subject thus far. Hirst’s monograph on Sebastiano del Piombo is also fundamental in the field. Beyond Michelangelo, he published important articles and essays on artists such as Francesco Salviati, Perin del Vaga and Parmigianino.

He was an Accademico d'Onore, or honorary member, of the Accademia delle Arti del Disegno of Florence.

Photographs contributed by Michael Hirst to the Conway Library are currently being digitised by the Courtauld Institute of Art, as part of the Courtauld Connects project.

== Prizes ==
- 2001, Serena Medal, British Academy.

== Publications ==
- Sebastiano del Piombo. Oxford University Press, 1981.
- Michelangelo and His Drawings. New Haven/London: Yale University Press, 1983. ISBN 0-300-04796-7
- The Young Michelangelo, with Jill Dunkerton. New Haven/London: Yale University Press, 1994. ISBN 978-0-300-06135-2
- The Sistine Chapel: A Glorious Restoration. Abradale Press Harry N. Abrams, Inc. Publishers, 1994. ISBN 0-8109-8176-9
- Michelangelo: The Achievement of Fame, New Haven/London: Yale University Press, 2011
