= List of alumni of the Courtauld Institute of Art =

The Courtauld Institute of Art is a self-governing college of the University of London specialising in the study of the history of art and conservation. It is among the most prestigious specialist colleges for the study of the history of art in the world and is widely known for the disproportionate number of directors of major museums drawn from its small body of alumni.

== Alumni ==
- María López-Fanjul y Díez del Corral director of the Museum of Fine Arts of Asturias
- Pamela Askew, historian of Baroque art
- James Austin, fine-art and architectural photographer
- Reyner Banham, critic
- Emily Barr, writer
- Graham W. J. Beal, director, Detroit Institute of Arts (1999–2015)
- John Béchervaise, writer
- Naomi Beckwith, curator at the Museum of Contemporary Art, Chicago
- Olivier Berggruen, art historian and curator
- Ron Bloore, artist
- Alan Borg, director, Victoria and Albert Museum (1995–2001); director, Imperial War Museum (1982–1995); keeper, Sainsbury Centre for Visual Arts (1978–1982)
- Eve Borsook
- Sir Alan Bowness, director, Henry Moore Foundation, (1988–1994); director, Tate Gallery (1980–1988)
- Allan Braham
- Anita Brookner, novelist and art historian; winner of the 1984 Booker Prize^{[1]}
- Wolf Burchard, art historian, author and curator
- Aviva Burnstock, conservator
- Martin Butlin, art historian
- Edie Campbell, model
- Thomas P. Campbell, former director, Metropolitan Museum of Art, New York (2009–2017)
- Peter Cannon-Brookes, art historian and curator
- Edmund Capon, director, Art Gallery of New South Wales (1978–2011)
- Rafael Cardoso, Brazilian writer and art historian^{[1]}
- Nigel Carrington, vice-chancellor, University of the Arts London^{[1]}
- Charlie Casely-Hayford, fashion designer
- Cathleen Chaffee, curator, art historian, writer
- Noah Charney, art historian and novelist
- Bridget Cherry, architectural historian and series editor of the Pevsner Architectural Guides (1971–2002)
- Betty Churcher, director, National Gallery of Australia (1990–1997)
- T. J. Clark, art historian^{[1]}
- Joshua Compston, curator
- Henry Conway, socialite
- Robin Cormack, classicist and Byzantine art historian^{[1]}
- Suzanne Cotter, curator and director, Grand Duke Jean Museum of Modern Art (2018-2021), director Museum of Contemporary Art Australia (2022–present)
- Nicholas Cullinan, director, National Portrait Gallery, London (2015–present)
- William J. R. Curtis, architectural historian
- Melvin Day, artist and art historian
- Jeremy Deller, artist; winner of the 2004 Turner Prize
- Anne d'Harnoncourt, director, Philadelphia Museum of Art (1982–2008)
- Emmanuel Di Donna, art dealer
- Kerry Downes, architectural historian
- Daisy Dunn, classicist, author, journalist and critic
- Nell Dunn, writer^{[1]}
- John Elderfield, chief curator of painting and sculpture, Museum of Modern Art, New York
- David Elliott, curator
- Lucy Ellmann, novelist^{[1]}
- Gabriele Finaldi, director, National Gallery (2015–present)
- Jonathan Foyle, architectural historian
- David Franklin, director, Cleveland Museum of Art (2010–2013)
- Stanisław Frenkiel, artist, art historian, head of art, Institute of Education
- Terry Friedman, art & architectural historian and curator
- Tamar Garb, art historian^{[1]}
- Julian Gardner, art historian
- Nicky Gavron, Deputy Mayor of London (2003–2004 and 2008–2012)
- Delia Gaze
- Roselee Goldberg, art historian and curator
- Cecil Gould, keeper, National Gallery (1973–1978)
- Andrew Graham-Dixon, critic^{[1]}
- Lindy Grant
- Theo Green, film composer
- Paul Greenhalgh, director, Sainsbury Centre for Visual Arts, Norwich (2010–present); director, Corcoran Gallery of Art, Washington, D.C. (2006–2010)
- Lavinia Greenlaw, poet and novelist^{[1]}
- Erin Griffey, art historian
- William M. Griswold, director, Cleveland Museum of Art (2014–present)
- Mark Hallett, director of studies, Paul Mellon Centre for Studies in British Art^{[1]}
- Jenny Harper, director National Art Gallery, New Zealand (1990–1992), director Christchurch Art Gallery (2006–present)
- Rosemary Harris, children's book author^{[1]}
- Sumaya bint Hassan, Jordanian princess
- John Hayes, director, National Portrait Gallery (1974–94)
- Deborah Howard, art historian
- Alice Instone, painter
- Michael Jaffé
- Lee Johnson, art historian
- Nancy Johnson
- Sir Mark Jones, director, Victoria and Albert Museum (2001–11)^{[1]}
- Francis Robert Kelly
- Martin Kemp, art historian
- Michael Kitson
- Tim Knox, director of the Royal Collection Trust, former director, Fitzwilliam Museum, Cambridge
- Nicole Krauss, novelist^{[1]}
- Ellen Lanyon
- Narisa Levy of the royal family of Thailand
- Walter Liedtke
- Neil MacGregor, director, National Gallery (1987–2002), British Museum (2002–2015)
- Denis Mahon
- Carolyn Marino Malone
- Jonathan Mane-Wheoki, curator, author, museum professional
- Tim Marlow, critic^{[1]}
- Andrew Martindale
- Matthew McLendon, director, McNay Art Museum; Fralin Museum of Art (2017-2023)
- Lady Delia Millar, art historian
- Sir Oliver Millar, Surveyor of the Queen's Pictures
- Christopher P. Monkhouse, American architectural historian and curator
- Edward Morris (1940-2016), gallerist and art historian
- Peter Murray, art historian
- Helly Nahmad, London-based gallerist and art dealer
- George T. Noszlopy
- John Onians, art historian^{[1]}
- Rozsika Parker
- Lucy Peltz
- Nicholas Penny, director, National Gallery (2008–2015)
- Joachim Pissarro, art historian^{[1]}
- Amy Plum
- Griselda Pollock, art historian^{[1]}
- Elizabeth Prettejohn, art historian^{[1]}
- Vincent Price, actor
- Benedict Read
- Jane, Lady Roberts, former royal librarian, Windsor Castle^{[1]}
- Irit Rogoff, writer and curator^{[1]}
- Atticus Ross, film composer
- Xavier F. Salomon, Deputy Director and Peter Jay Sharp Chief Curator, The Frick Collection, New York. (2014-present)
- Aaron Scharf
- Sir Nicholas Serota, director, Tate (1988–present)
- Brian Sewell, critic^{[1]}
- Desmond Shawe-Taylor
- John Shearman, Renaissance art historian
- Amanda Simpson (née Tomlinson)
- Iain Sinclair, novelist^{[1]}
- Bernard Smith, art historian
- David Solkin, dean and deputy director, Courtauld Institute of Art^{[1]}
- Alastair Sooke, art historian and journalist^{[1]}
- Roger Stalley, art historian
- Phoebe Stanton, PhD 1950, art historian, faculty at Johns Hopkins University (1955–1982)
- John Steer, art historian
- Alexander Sturgis
- Ann Sumner
- John Russell Taylor, film critic and author^{[1]}
- Michael R. Taylor, museum director
- Matthew Teitelbaum
- Simon Thurley, architectural historian, director of the Museum of London
- Roger Took
- Emily Tsingou
- Pamela Tudor-Craig
- Ernst Vegelin van Claerbergen, head of the Courtauld Gallery
- Jeff Wall, Canadian artist
- Giles Waterfield, novelist^{[1]}
- Alexandra Wedgwood
- Perdita Weeks
- Marian Wenzel
- Annabel J. Wharton, American art historian, Duke University
- David White, officer of arms
- John White, art historian
- Esmé Whittaker, curator at English Heritage
- Sarah Wilson, art historian
- Joanna Woodall
- Joan Elizabeth Woollard
- Giles Worsley
- Nicolai Tangen, Norwegian hedge fund manager and philanthropist credited with holding the biggest private collection of modernist Nordic art in the world
- Imogen Poots, actress
- Noah Horowitz, art historian and director of Americas for Art Basel's show in Miami Beach since 2015
- Lucy Beall Lott, art historian, activist and model with epidermolysis bullosa dystrophica
- Klara Kemp Welch, art historian, modern and contemporary Eastern European art
