= Andrew Martindale =

British historian of medieval and Renaissance art (1932–1995)

Andrew Henry Robert Martindale (1932–1995) was Professor of Visual Art at the University of East Anglia at the time of his sudden death at age 62. One of the pioneers in the teaching of art history as an academic discipline and a founding member of the Association of Art Historians, he was also a highly respected medieval scholar specialising in the late Gothic and early Renaissance periods with a number of publications to his name. His 1972 book, The Rise of the Artist, is much vaunted, often cited, and has been described as 'a brilliant study of the hierarchies within the medieval patronage system'.

== Early life ==
Andrew Martindale was born in Bombay on 19 December 1932, the son of Henry Martindale, a Church of England cleric who was Archdeacon of Bombay from 1927 to 1933, and Augusta Martindale. He attended the choir school of Christ Church Cathedral School, Oxford, then Westminster School before going on to read for a degree in history at New College, Oxford where he was friends with Peter Brown. His postgraduate qualification from the Courtauld Institute of Art, where he studied or worked alongside leading figures in the art history world, Anthony Blunt, George Zarnecki, Peter Kidson, Brian Sewell and Christopher Hohler, led to a lifelong career as an art historian and academic. He has been lauded as 'an impeccable art historian'.

== Career ==
After a year of working with Nikolaus Pevsner on the Buildings of England series, specifically in Surrey and Norfolk, Martindale was appointed lecturer at the Courtauld in 1959 by Anthony Blunt. Whilst the study of art history in Britain was established in the 1930s following the opening of the Courtauld in 1932, from the 1960s onwards the appetite for art history as an academic subject increased and art history departments were set up at the new universities (including the Universities of East Anglia, Essex and Sussex), at polytechnics (such as Middlesex) and other institutions of higher and further education. As John Onians said of his colleague in the obituary for The Independent 'Martindale was an exemplary figure, whose active role was significant in setting standards and determining direction' in establishing and popularising the discipline of study in the history of art. In his role as University Grants Commission's adviser on art history, he was an avid spokesperson for the subject and is praised for his handling of the crucial first Research Assessment exercises.

Martindale remained a lecturer in medieval and renaissance art history at the Courtauld Institute until 1965 when Peter Lasko asked him to join the School of Fine Art and Music being established at the new University of East Anglia (UEA); a department that was to become a rigorously academic centre of art history which expanded away from the traditions of studying only Western art and architecture. Firstly evolving into the School of World Art Studies and Museology, a move that Martindale oversaw, it is now known as the School of Art, Media and American Studies; a global department. He was appointed senior lecturer in 1965, dean in 1971 and succeeded Lasko as Professor of Visual Art in 1974. In these latter roles he became closely involved in the creation of the Sainsbury Centre for Visual Arts to house the collection of over 300 20thc. artworks and ethnographic objects donated to the university in 1973 by Sir Robert Sainsbury and Lady Lisa Sainsbury together with an endowment for the building which was designed by Norman Foster. The building, that also housed the School of World Art Studies and Museology, was opened in 1978 to critical acclaim and was later expanded to include an extension also funded by the Sainsburys. It became a Grade II listed building in 2012.

Manuscripts and photographs from the collection of Andrew Martindale are held in UEA's Photographic Collection in the Sainsbury Centre for Visual Arts and, while he was at the Courtauld, Martindale also contributed photographs to the Conway Library whose archive of architectural images is in the process of being digitised.

== Public work and honours ==
As a founder member of the Association of Art Historians, Martindale supported its annual conferences and was primarily responsible for conceiving its journal, Art History, first published in 1978. He served for nearly thirty years on the Council for the Care of Churches as well as on the University Grants Committee and the University Faculty Committee. He was also an elected Fellow of the Society of Antiquaries of London.

When Professor George Henderson, a founder member of the steering committee of the Harlaxton Medieval Symposium, an annual event held at Harlaxton Manor inaugurated by Pamela Tudor-Craig in 1984, retired to Scotland, Professor Martindale took over his position. The Symposium in the year of his tragic death was to be convened by him and the papers presented that year became a Festschrift in his honour; England and the Continent in the Middle Ages : studies in memory of Andrew Martindale. In the year of his death he was also president of the Ecclesiastical History Society.

In Martindale's obituary for The Man and Other Families, the writer observed how fitting it was 'that his ashes now lie in the cloister of Norwich Cathedral where he had chaired the Fabric Advisory committee since 1991'.

Following Professor Martindale's death, friends and colleagues contributed to a memorial fund which has been used to fund the annual Martindale lecture series.

== Personal life ==
In 1959 Andrew Martindale married Jane Brooke, a fellow medievalist and emerita of the University of East Anglia who publishes under the name of Jane Martindale. Andrew was a gifted pianist and played the harpsichord and piano all his life having acquired musical skills when he was a choir boy. He died on 29 May 1995 in Norwich from a brain tumour after a short illness.

== Selected publications ==
- Man and the Renaissance, London: Hamlyn, 1967
- Gothic Art, London: Thames and Hudson, 1967
- The Complete Paintings of Giotto, introduction by Andrew Martindale, notes and catalogue by Edi Baccheschi, London: Weidenfeld and Nicolson, 1969, ISBN 0297761420
- The Complete Paintings of Mantegna, Introduction by Andrew Martindale, notes and catalogue by Niny Garavaglia, London: Weidenfeld and Nicolson, 1971, ISBN 0297761463
- The Rise of the Artist in the Middle Ages and Early Renaissance, London: Thames and Hudson, 1972, ISBN 0500560064
- The Triumphs of Caesar by Andrea Mantegna in the Collection of Her Majesty the Queen at Hampton Court with a foreword by Sir Anthony Blunt, London : Harvey Miller, 1979, ISBN 090520316X
- Simone Martini, Oxford: Phaidon, 1988, ISBN 0714823953
- Heroes, Ancestors, Relatives and the Birth of the Portrait, The Hague: Gary Schwartz/SDU, 1988, ISBN 9061790697
- Painting the Palace: Studies in the History of Medieval Secular Painting, London: Pindar Press, 1995, ISBN 0907132901

Martindale also wrote the entry on Simone Martini in Grove Art Online and contributed to the entry 'Western Sculpture' in Encyclopædia Britannica.
