= Elizabeth Park =

Elizabeth Park may refer to:

- Elizabeth Park (Connecticut), a city park in Hartford and West Hartford, Connecticut
- Elizabeth Park (Newfoundland), a park in Paradise, Newfoundland
- Elizabeth Park (Michigan), a county park in Trenton, Michigan
- Elizabeth Park, South Australia, a northern suburb of Adelaide
- Uplands, Ottawa, a neighbourhood in Ottawa, Canada, also known as Elizabeth Park
- Elisabeth Park, a city park in Brussels, Belgium

== See also ==
- Elizabeth Parker (disambiguation)
- Queen Elizabeth Park (disambiguation)
