= Frank Kelly (disambiguation) =

Frank Kelly (1938–2016), was an Irish actor

Frank Kelly may also refer to:

- Frank Kelly (footballer, born 1892) (1892–1919), Scottish footballer
- Frank Kelly (footballer, born 1910) (1910–1982), Australian rules footballer for Collingwood, Melbourne, Essendon and St Kilda
- Frank Kelly (footballer, born 1921) (1921–1974), Australian rules footballer for Footscray
- Frank Kelly (footballer, born 1950) (1950–2006), Australian rules footballer for Richmond
- Frank Kelly (mathematician) (born 1950), University of Cambridge professor
- Frank Kelly (physiologist), air pollution scientist

== See also ==
- Francis Kelly (disambiguation)
- Frank Kelley (disambiguation)
