= Outstanding Theses from the Courtauld Institute of Art =

1980s book series

Outstanding theses from the Courtauld Institute of Art is a book series published by Garland of New York between 1984 and 1986 that reprinted outstanding PhD theses from the Courtauld Institute of Art that would otherwise have remained unpublished. The series was one of three major thesis series published by Garland, the others being Outstanding Dissertations in the Fine Arts and Outstanding Theses in the Fine Arts from British Universities.

== Titles ==
- The Library and Manuscripts of Piero di Cosimo de'Medici. Francis Ames-Lewis, 1984.
- A Study of Richard Symonds: His Italian Notebooks and Their Relevance to Seventeenth Century-Painting Techniques. Mary Beal, 1984. ISBN 082405976X
- Social and Religious Themes in English Art 1840-1860. Lindsay Errington, 1984.
- Early Romanesque Sculpture in Apulia. Tessa Garton, 1984.
- The Stained Glass of the Collegiate Church of the Holy Trinity Tattershall (Lincs.). Richard Marks, 1984.
- The Romanesque Church Façade in Britain. J. Philip McAleer, 1984. ISBN 0824059794
- John Ruskin: Late Work 1870-1890. The Museum and guild of St George: an educational experiment. Cathereine W. Morley, 1984.
- Early Medieval Wall-Paintings in the Lower Church of San Clemente, Rome. John Osborne, 1984.
- The Dress Worn at Masquerades in England, 1730 to 1790, and Its Relation to Fancy Dress in Portraiture. Aileen Ribeiro, 1984.
- The Connections Between English and Bohemian Painting During the Second Half of the Fourteenth Century. Amanda Simpson, 1984.
- Decorative Painting in the Domestic Interior in England and Wales, c. 1850-1890. Helen Elizabeth Smith, 1984. ISBN 0824059867
- Flaxman and Europe: The Outline Illustrations and Their Influence. Sarah Symmons, 1984.
- Women Artists in Nineteenth Century France and England: Their Art Education, Exhibition Opportunities and Membership of Exhibition Societies and Academies &c. Charlotte Yeldham, 1984.
- The Drawings of Henry Moore. Alan G. Wilkinson, 1984.
- The Scriptorium of Bury St. Edmunds in the Twelfth Century. Elizabeth Parker McLachlan, 1986.
