= Instone =

Instone is an English surname. Notable people with the surname include:

- Alice Instone (born 1975), British artist
- Samuel Instone (1878–1937), British shipping and aviation entrepreneur
