= Francis Kelly =

Francis Kelly may refer to:

== Politicians ==
- Francis Kelly (Australian politician) (1893–1980), New South Wales politician
- Francis Kelly (Canadian politician) (1803–1879), Canadian surveyor and politician
- Francis Kelly (New Zealand politician) (1883–1977), member of the New Zealand Legislative Council
- Francis E. Kelly (1903–1982), 53rd Lieutenant Governor of Massachusetts, United States

== Others ==
- Francis Kelly (bishop of Derry) (died 1889), Irish prelate of the Roman Catholic Church
- Francis Kelly (British Army officer) (1859–1937), British Army general
- Francis Kelly (Medal of Honor) (1860–1938), U.S. Navy sailor in the Spanish–American War
- Francis Martin Kelly (1886–1950), third Roman Catholic bishop of the Diocese of Winona
- Francis W. Kelly (1910–1982), American Catholic priest
- Francis Robert Kelly (1927–2012), American artist, printmaker, art restorer and author
- Francis P. Kelly (active since 1991), English architectural historian

== See also ==
- Francis Kelley (1870–1948), second Roman Catholic Bishop of Oklahoma, United States
- Frank Kelly (disambiguation)
