= Symmons =

Symmons is an English language surname. It stems from the male given name Simon. Notable people with the name include:

- Charles Symmons (1749–1826), Welsh poet and priest
- Charles Augustus John Symmons (1804–1887), administrator in Western Australia
- Michael Symmons Roberts (born 1963), British poet
- Nikki Symmons (born 1982), former Ireland women's field hockey international
- Paul Symmons (born 1973), former Australian rules footballer
- Sarah Symmons, English art historian and writer
