= Charles Barham =

Charles Barham may refer to:

- Charles Barham (priest) (died 1935), Archdeacon of Bombay
- Charles C. Barham (1934–2010), American attorney
- C. E. Barham (Charles Emmett Barham, 1904–1972), Democratic lieutenant governor of Louisiana
- Charles Foster Barham (1804–1884), English physician
- Charles Middleton, 1st Baron Barham (1726–1813), British naval officer and politician
