= Deborah Kahn =

Academic specialising in European Medieval art and architecture

- Born: 1953 (age 72–73)

Academic background
- Education: Sarah Lawrence College, The Courtauld Institute of Art
- Thesis: Romanesque Architecture Sculpture in Kent (1982)
- Doctoral advisor: George Zarnecki

Academic work
- Discipline: History of Art
- Sub-discipline: Medieval studies, Romanesque art

Deborah Kahn (born 1953) is an American art historian, author, and academic, specializing in European Medieval art and architecture. She is an eminent figure in the study of Canterbury Cathedral collection. Kahn has acted as a consultant on sculpture and conservation to Canterbury Cathedral and Lincoln Cathedral. She became Visiting Assistant Professor, Department of Art History at Columbia University from 1986 to 1987. She went on to work at Princeton University, from 1989 to 1991; before joining Boston University in 1996, where she is currently Associate Professor, in the department of art history. She is the author of two books, as well as numerous articles and conference papers.

== Early life and career ==
Kahn attended Sarah Lawrence College for undergraduate studies, where she received her B.A. degree. Kahn studied for both her M.A. degree and PhD at The Courtauld Institute of Art, completing it in 1982 with a thesis, "Romanesque Architecture Sculpture in Kent". She studied with George Zarnecki, who also served as her doctoral advisor, and her method of study focused more on contextual considerations combined with the formalist approaches that Zarnecki is known for. During her time at the Courtauld, she along with many other academics, contributed photographs to the Conway Library, an archive of historical architectural images, which is in the process of being digitized.

== Career ==
In 1984 she worked for Zarnecki as Chief Research Officer and Administrator for his Hayward Gallery exhibition, ''English Romanesque Art 1066–1200''. This was recognised as the greatest collection of early medieval English art ever brought at that time into this country, it was in many respects the crowning achievement of George's career. The catalogue remains a widely used reference document.

The book, ''Canterbury Cathedral and its Romanesque Sculpture'' was published in 1991. Contemporary scholarly reviews tended to praise the book, which built on the theories of George Zarnecki rather than challenging them, best summarised by Jill Franklin in the Burlington Review as '' a careful, unpretentious and conventional study of one of the major ensembles of English romanesque architecture''. No equivalent major study has been published to date. Whilst there have been several articles analysing specific detail, their references would indicate that her book remains a core foundation for any subsequent research on the subject.

Historians have both questioned Kahn's work, and continued to build on it:

- In an otherwise positive review in 1998 - '' In one of the best books of its kind, Deborah Kahn has presented a wealth of material on Canterbury without becoming lost in the isolation of her subject'' - John James contended she should have commented in more detail on the historical events which disrupted the building programme in the mid 12th century.
- In developing Zarnecki's arguments, she draws parallels between the patterns of capital carving and the contemporary decoration in manuscripts. In 2017, Richard Gameson challenged this as an assumption in his essay ''The Romanesque Crypt Capitals of Canterbury Cathedral''.
- Kahn had challenged the arguments in Francis Woodman's book published in 1981, ''The Architectural History of Canterbury Cathedral''. In particular, they disagreed about the provenance of a group of finely carved fragments discovered in the 1970s. Fragments continue to be unearthed, resulting in fresh research and insights. Most recently, in 2019 Carolyn Marino Malone published ''Twelfth Century Sculptural Finds at Canterbury Cathedral''. She supports Kahn's arguments, but suggests minor revisions to the dates of construction.

== Professional service ==
- Chief Research Officer and Administrator for the Arts Council of Great Britain Hayward Gallery Exhibition, ''English Romanesque Art 1066 - 1200'' (exhibition held 1984)
- Consultant on Medieval Sculpture for the Dean and Chapter of Canterbury Cathedral 1982 - 1988
- Consultant on Medieval Sculpture for the Dean and Chapter of Lincoln Cathedral 1986 - 1988
- Contributing Editor to the Corpus of Romanesque Sculpture in the British Isles (position funded by the British Academy in London).

== Honours and awards ==
Kahn was elected a Fellow of the Society of Antiquaries of London in 1984. She was awarded a Mellon Fellowship at the Metropolitan Museum of Art, New York City, between 1987 and 1988.

== Books ==
- Kahn, Deborah (1991). Canterbury Cathedral and its Romanesque Sculpture. Harvey Miller Publishers, University of Texas Press. ISBN 978-0905203188.
- The Romanesque Frieze and its Spectator, (editor), London, Harvey Miller Press/Oxford University Press, 1992
- Kahn, Deborah (2021). The Politics of Sanctity. Figurative Sculpture at Selles-sur-Cher. Studies in Medieval and Early Renaissance Art History. Harvey Miller Publishers. ISBN 9781912554362.
