= Peter Lasko =

British art historian

Peter Erik Lasko CBE FBA (5 March 1924 – 18 May 2003) was a British art historian, Professor of Visual Art at the University of East Anglia, from 1965 to 1974, Director of the Courtauld Institute of Art, London, from 1974–85 and a Fellow of the British Academy.

== Life ==
Lasko was born and grew up in Berlin, where his father Leo Lasko worked in the film industry as a director and screenwriter. The family moved to England in 1936. He attended Saint Martin's School of Art but soon switched to art history, firstly studying at Birbeck College under Nikolaus Pevsner, then at the Courtauld Institute of Art from 1946 to 1949. In 1950 he became assistant keeper in the Department of British and Medieval Antiquities at the British Museum, where he remained for 15 years.

In 1965, he became the first professor of art history at the new University of East Anglia (UEA) establishing the School of Fine Art and Music. He brought together a teaching staff which people have said was second only to the Courtauld Institute of Art. He assembled academics such as Andrew Martindale, headhunted from the Courtauld, who was his successor as Professor of Visual Art when Lasko left after eight years to become Director of the Courtauld Institute, succeeding Anthony Blunt in 1974.

Described as ‘a brilliant administrator’, Lasko, when he was at UEA, secured the gift of the Sainsbury Centre for Visual Arts when he persuaded Sir Robert and Lady Lisa Sainsbury that it was a perfect place to house their collection of artworks and ethnographic objects. The building, housing both the gallery and the school, was designed by Norman Foster and opened in 1974. It was on the strength of these administrative skills and track record that he was given the directorship of the Courtauld. The main task that Blunt left was to find a new permanent home for the institute, which, after a few twists and turns, Lasko did by starting negotiations with the Secretary of State and the Treasury to move the Courtald to Somerset House in the north wing facing the Strand. It was a move, completed in 1989, not overseen by Lasko as, after securing the majority of the funding, he retired in 1985 citing ill health. While he was at the Courtauld he donated photographs to the Conway Library whose archive of primarily architectural photographs are being digitised as part of the wider Courtald Connects project.

Following his retirement from the Courtauld he devoted much of his time to the "Corpus of Romanesque Sculpture in Great Britain and Northern Ireland", a project he took over from George Zarnecki, and a book on German Expressionist art, which was published after his death.

Lasko became a British citizen in 1948 and in the 1981 Birthday Honours was appointed a Commander of the Order of the British Empire (CBE). He was also made a fellow of The British Academy. A festschrift in his honour, Studies in Medieval Art and Architecture : presented to Peter Lasko, was published in 1994.

=== Work at public institutions ===
- British Museum - member of board of trustees, 1980–95
- Royal Armouries - trustee, 1983–91
- Royal Commission on the Historical Monuments of England - member, 1984–90
- Cathedrals Fabric Commission - member, 1984–96
- American University of London - academic governor of Richmond College, 1988–2001

Having become a fan while he was at UEA, Lasko continued to be a supporter of Norwich City Football Club.

Peter Lasko died in France on 18 May 2003. He was survived by his wife Lyn, whom he married in 1948, and three daughters.

== Publications ==
- The Kingdom of the Franks: North-west Europe Before Charlemagne, London : Thames and Hudson, 1971, ISBN 050056003X
- Ars Sacra: 800-1200, New Haven; London : Yale University Press, 1994. Previous ed.: London: Penguin, 1972, ISBN 0300053673
- Medieval Art in East Anglia, 1300-1520, ed. N. J. Morgan, London : Thames and Hudson, 1973, ISBN 0500232032
- The Painting Collections of the Courtauld Institute of Art, 1979
- Two Ivory Kings in the British Museum and the Norman Conquest, Newcastle upon Tyne : University of Newcastle upon Tyne, 1983, ISBN 0701700327
- Wells Cathedral west front. Construction, sculpture and conservation by Jerry Sampson, Foreword H.R.H. The Prince of Wales, Preface Peter Lasko, Stroud : Sutton Publishing Ltd, 1998, ISBN 0750914505
- The Expressionist Roots of Modernism, Manchester : Manchester University Press, 2003, ISBN 0719064104

Academic offices
Preceded by Anthony Blunt	Director of the Courtauld Institute of Art; 1974 to 1985	Succeeded by Michael Kauffmann
