= Peter Cannon =

Peter Cannon may refer to:

- Peter H. Cannon (born 1951), H. P. Lovecraft scholar and author of Cthulhu Mythos fiction
- Peter Cannon-Brookes (born 1938), British art historian
- Peter Cannon, Thunderbolt, fictional superhero character originally published by Charlton Comics

== See also ==
- Pete Cannon, stage name of Peter Buchanan, British jungle, house and hip hop music producer, DJ and vocalist
