= Jemma Field =

Art historian from New Zealand

Jemma Field is a historian and art historian from New Zealand. She studied for her PhD with Erin Griffey at the University of Auckland. She was subsequently a Marie Skłodowska-Curie postdoctoral fellow at Brunel University, London. She is currently Associate Director of Research at the Yale Center for British Art.

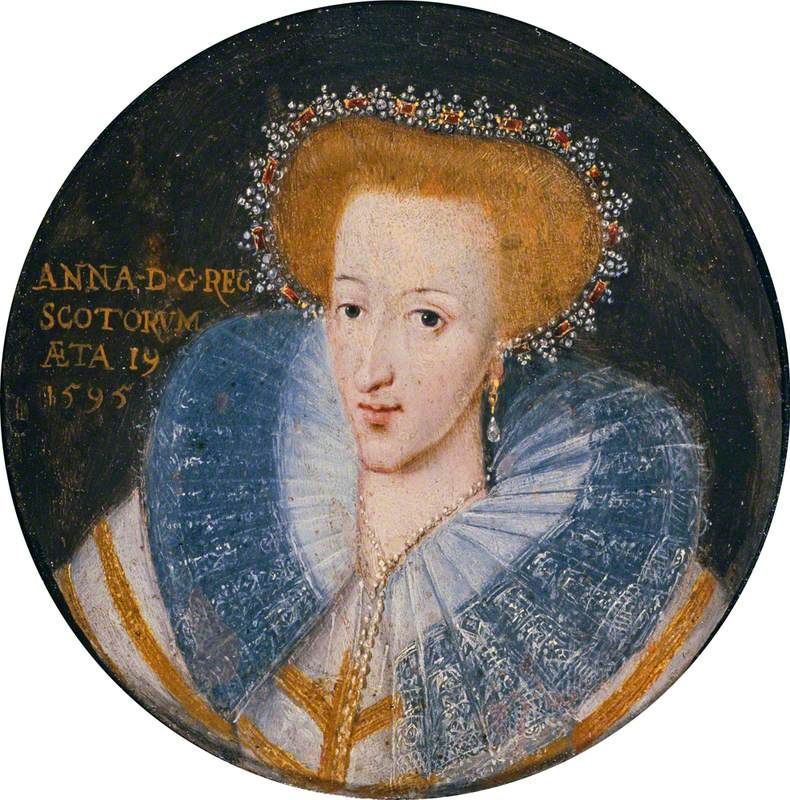
Anna of Denmark, studio of Adrian Vanson

Field's published work concerns the material culture of Anne of Denmark, queen consort of Scotland, and wife of James VI and I. Like many modern writers she prefers the use of the forename "Anna" instead of "Anne". Her ideas about Anne of Denmark's personal piety and religious views, and the role of her Danish chaplain Johannes Sering, contribute to contemporary debate.

Field examines the ways in which Anne of Denmark expressed her identity and agency through her own dress and bodily ornament, including her jewellery, and also the costume of her servants and household, which reflected both the customs of Scotland and the royal court of Denmark and the House of Oldenburg.

== Selected publications ==
- "Dressing the Stuarts: The Sartorial Politics of Mourning and Matrimony, 1612–1613", British Art Studies 29 (December 2025). doi:10.17658/issn.2058-5462/issue-29/jfield
- 'Dressing the Stuart Court', Kate Anderson, Art & Court of James VI & I (Edinburgh: National Galleries of Scotland, 2025), pp. 41–51.
- 'Clothing the Royal Family: The Intersection of the Court and City in Early Stuart London', Peter Edwards, Monarchy, the Court, and the Provincial Elite in Early Modern Europe (Brill, 2024). doi:10.1163/9789004694149_014
- 'Anna of Denmark: Daughter, Wife, Sister, and Mother of Kings', Aidan Norrie, Carolyn Harris, J. L. Laynesmith, Danna R. Messer, Elena Woodacre, Tudor and Stuart Consorts (Palgrave Macmillan, 2022), pp. 211-229
- 'Female dress', Erin Griffey, Early Modern Court Culture (Routledge, 2022), pp. 390-405
- Anna of Denmark: The Material and Visual Culture of the Stuart Courts (Manchester, 2020)
- 'Anna of Denmark’s Jewellery and the Politics of Dynastic Display', Erin Griffey, Sartorial Politics in Early Modern Europe (Amsterdam UP, 2019), pp. 139-160
- 'Anna of Denmark and the Politics of Religious Identity in Jacobean Scotland and England, c. 1592-1619', Northern Studies, 50 (2019), pp. 87-113
- "Dressing a Queen: The Wardrobe of Anna of Denmark at the Scottish Court of King James VI, 1590–1603", The Court Historian, 24:2 (2019). doi:10.1080/14629712.2019.1626120
- "Anna of Denmark: A Late Portrait by Paul van Somer", The British Art Journal, XVIII:2 (2017).
- "The Wardrobe Goods of Anna of Denmark, Queen Consort of Scotland and England (1574–1619)", Costume, 51:2 (March 2017). doi:10.3366/cost.2017.0003
