= Chekago =

Novel by Sarah Symmons

- First edition Hodder & Stoughton (UK); E. P. Dutton (US)
- Author: Sarah Symmons
- Language: English
- Publication date: 1988

Chekago is the debut novel of the writer and academic Sarah Symmons. A comic novel set in the Moscow of the early 1980s, the book was published under the author's pseudonym Natalya Lowndes in order to protect her friends and relatives in the then-USSR. Chekago was widely praised in the press, receiving positive reviews from Margaret Forster, Janice Elliott, Norman Shrapnel, Victoria Glendinning and Michael Ignatieff among others. First published in January 1988 the novel went into three editions in the first year and was published by Dutton in America where it was also widely and positively reviewed. In 1989 it was translated into Portuguese for the Brazilian edition.

Three further novels have been published by the same author. Angel In the Sun ( Hodder and Stoughton 1989), Snow Red ( Hodder and Stoughton 1992) and, under the author's real name, J S Goubert Indigo Eyes, ( Feverpress 2014)

"When Chekago, a first novel by Natalya Lowndes was contracted by Hodder, publisher Ion Trewin declared he could not remember the last occasion when 'the slush pile' had yielded a marketable book." (Barry Turner [ed] The Writer's Handbook, Macmillan, 1988,)7.

"Seen from Within Soviet Society was rotten to the core...with drabness and human degradation in a Moscow derisively nicknamed 'Chekago' (Lowndes 1988)." (Folke Dovring, Leninism Political Economy as Pseudoscience, Praeger, 1996. p. 129) T.J.Binyon wrote that Chekago was a "curio...hilariously funny" especially the three sex scenes, the principal heroine " beautiful and depraved." (T J Binyon, The London Review of Books, 15 September 1988).

On the other hand, Simon Sebag Montefiore, writing in the Spectator in November 1995, saw the emergence of a new kind of Russian heroine " A new literary genre...Chekago along with the Loves of Faustina by Nina Fitzpatrick and Russian Beauty by Viktor Erofeyev, are examples of what one might call ' sex-and-CentralCommittee novels. All feature wild, clever Slavic heroines who seduce Politburo members, western toffs, poets and gangsters while quoting Eugene Onegin and Vogue." (Simon Sebag Montefiore, Russia's top export adventuresses, Spectator November 1995; Reprinted New Zealand Slavonic Journal 1996, pp. 248–251)
