= Frank Kelley =

Frank Kelley may refer to:

- Frank J. Kelley (1924–2021), Attorney General of the U.S. state of Michigan
- Frank Kelley (tenor), American tenor

== See also ==
- Frank Kelly (disambiguation)
- Francis Kelley (1870–1948), Roman Catholic bishop, author and diplomat
