= Neuroarthistory =

Approach to the neurological study of artists

Neuroarthistory is a term coined by Professor John Onians, an art historian at the University of East Anglia in 2005. Neuroarthistory is an approach that concerns the neurological study of artists, both living and dead.

In 2004 Onians taught the Postgraduate module "Art and the Brain" named after the 1999 paper by Professor Semir Zeki which was the first postgraduate course in an art history department that applied neuroscientific principles. In 2005, he began working with Zeki, who is a professor of Neurobiology at University College London (and founder of Neuroesthetics) to study what goes on in the brains of artists. They used neuroimaging and studied the neurobiological processes of artists such as the painters of the Paleolithic Chauvet Cave art.

In May 2005 Onians founded Neuroarthistory in a lecture at the Neuroaesthetics Conference Goldsmiths May 2005. In 2006, he wrote and presented the paper 'Neuroarthistory: making more sense of art' which, according to The Art Book "explored the ways in which our ever-expanding knowledge of the brain invites art historians to reconsider the interaction between the senses and cognition."

In September 2006, Onians presented the results of the research to the BA Festival of Science in a lecture called 'Cracking the real Da Vinci Code: what happens in the artist's brain?'. The object of the study was to learn more about how artists think, and how these thought processes differ between artists of different eras and locations, as well as the differences between professional and amateur artists. Professor Onians has said that neuroarthistory can be used "both to better understand the nature of familiar artistic phenomena such as style, and to crack so far intractable problems such as ‘what is the origin of art?’" According to a press release, neuroarthistory can explain why "Florentine painters made more use of line and Venetian painters more of colour. The reason is that 'neural plasticity' ensured that passive exposure to different natural and man-made environments caused the formation of different visual preferences."

A book, Neuroarthistory: From Aristotle and Pliny to Baxandall and Zeki was published in 2008 by Yale University Press, discussing a number of case studies from art history, and being the 'preface' to a further two books on the subject.
