= Lindsay Errington =

Scottish art historian

Lindsay Margaret Errington is a Scottish art historian and former keeper for over 20 years at the National Gallery of Scotland, Edinburgh, where she worked to establish a representative collection of Scottish art.

== Early life ==
Lindsay Errington was born in Edinburgh and trained as a painter at the Camberwell School of Art in London but did not follow that as a career. She studied art history at the Courtauld Institute of Art and later completed a PhD there on the subject of "Social and religious themes in English Art" (1973). It was published in book form by Garland in 1984 in their Outstanding theses from the Courtauld Institute of Art series.

== Career ==
Errington taught at the Newcastle College of Art but did not find the work to her liking, preferring to be in Scotland, and was appointed to a curatorial post at the National Gallery of Scotland in 1972, only the second woman to hold such a post. She was asked to look after the Scottish paintings, which her male colleagues did not think an honour, but which she was delighted to do. She was at the gallery for over 20 years where she worked to establish a representative collection of Scottish art and produced many of the monographs on Scottish artists in the Scottish Masters series.

In 1988-89 she was Slade Professor of Fine Art at the University of Cambridge when she was the first Slade professor to lecture on Scottish art.

In 2017, Errington published her most recent book, Private Views, which featured images from the National Gallery's collection with verses composed in response to them.

== Selected publications ==
- The Artist and the Kirk. National Galleries of Scotland, Edinburgh, 1979. ISBN 0903148242
- Sir William Quiller Orchardson, 1832-1910. National Galleries of Scotland, Edinburgh, 1980. ISBN 0903148285
- Social and religious themes in English Art 1840-1860. Garland, New York, 1984. (Outstanding theses from the Courtauld Institute of Art series) ISBN 978-0824059774
- Alexander Carse. National Galleries of Scotland, Edinburgh, 1987. (Scottish Masters No. 2) ISBN 0903148706
- David Wilkie, 1785-1841. National Galleries of Scotland, Edinburgh, 1988. (Scottish Masters No. 10) ISBN 0903148854
- William McTaggart 1835-1910. National Galleries of Scotland, Edinburgh, 1989. ISBN 0903148919
- Scotland's pictures: The national collection of Scottish art. National Galleries of Scotland, Edinburgh, 1990. ISBN 0903148994
- Robert Herdman, 1829-1888. National Galleries of Scotland, Edinburgh, 1998. (Scottish Masters No. 5)
- Private Views: Eight poems on paintings in the Scottish National Gallery. XX Press, Edinburgh, 2017. ISBN 9780950730172
