= Elizabeth Parker =

Elizabeth Parker may refer to:

- Elizabeth Parker (composer), worked at the BBC Radiophonic Workshop
- Elizabeth Parker (journalist) (1856–1944), Canadian journalist and co-founder of the Alpine Club of Canada
- Elizabeth Parker McLachlan, American photographer, professor, editor and writer
- Elizabeth Spencer, Baroness Hunsdon (1552–1618), married name Elizabeth Parker
- Liz Parker, a fictional character and the protagonist of the Roswell High book series and Roswell television series
- Bonnie Elizabeth Parker, see Bonnie and Clyde
