= Richard Broxton Onians =

Richard Broxton Onians (1899–1986) was a classicist and Hildred Carlile Professor of Latin in the University of London. His major publication was The Origins of European Thought: About the Body, the Mind, the Soul, the World, Time and Fate (Cambridge UP, 1951).

== Early life ==
Onians was born in Liverpool on 11 January 1899; his father was Richard Henry Onians. He served in the 4th South Lancs and the RAF in 1917–1918, and then gained a first class degree in classics at Liverpool University. In 1922 he became a research student at Trinity College, Cambridge, where his thesis won the Hare Prize.

== Academic career ==
Onians was a lecturer at the University of Liverpool in 1925–1933, and professor of classics at the University of Wales in 1933–1935. In 1936 he became Hildred Carlile Professor of Latin at the University of London until his retirement in 1966, and was thereafter an emeritus professor.

== Origins of European Thought ==
Onians' doctoral research explored concepts in Homer and was awarded the Hare Prize in 1926, a condition being that the work should be published by 1929. He negotiated an extension to this time limit, and although a 1935 draft with the title Origins of Greek & Roman Thought, mainly concerning the body, the mind, the soul and fate is held by the British Library, his book, though circulating in manuscript, was not published until 1951, as The Origins of European Thought: About the Body, the Mind, the Soul, the World, Time and Fate (Cambridge University Press).

It was reprinted, with corrections and a slightly expanded appendix, in 1954. In 1988 Cambridge University Press printed a paperback edition, which was reissued in 2011. (ISBN 9781107648005).

His obituary in The Times in 1986 said "Although the book, which covers a vast field, does not always carry conviction, it was one of the most important of its day in the field of classical studies and remains a valuable tool", and commented that he had published little else although he had worked on additions to the book. Jules Brody wrote in 2014: "His prodigious learning and intellectual daring put Onians squarely in a class with Damaso Alonso, Ernst-Robert Curtius, Mario Praz, and Leo Spitzer. And yet his book has been virtually ignored by classicists, philosophers, and philologists, at least in the world of Anglo-Saxon scholarship."

== Personal life ==
Onians married Rosalind Lathbury, who had been one of his students, on 27 December 1937. They had six children: Dick Onians, sculptor; John Onians, polymath; and four daughters. He was a council member of the Association of University Teachers in 1946-53 and a member of its executive committee in 1946–1951. He died on 21 May 1986.
