= Charles Barham (priest) =

Anglican archdeacon

Charles Mitchell Barham was Archdeacon of Bombay from 1913 until 1919.

Barham was educated at Downing College, Cambridge and ordained in 1891. After a curacy in Loughborough he was a Chaplain overseas at Aden, Byculla, Poona, Colaba, Nasirabad and Belgaum before his appointment as Archdeacon; and held incumbencies at Kempsford, Herriard and Beech Hill afterwards.

He died on 30 September 1935.
