= Emmanuel Di Donna =

- Born: December 1971 (age 54); Paris, France
- Occupation: Art dealer

Emmanuel Di Donna (born December 1971) is a New York-based art dealer and co-founder of Pace Di Donna Schrader Galleries, a secondary market gallery specializing in 19th and 20th century masterworks. From 2010 to 2026, he was owner and director of Di Donna Galleries (Blain Di Donna from 2010 to 2015), a gallery specializing in European and American art from 1900 to 1970, with an emphasis on Surrealism.

Di Donna appeared on Art + Auction's 'Power 100' list in 2010, and featured again in the 2012 edition.

== Education and Early Career ==
After receiving a master's degree in History of Art from the Courtauld Institute of Art in London, Di Donna joined Sotheby's in 1994 as a Director of their Paris office. In 2002, Di Donna was appointed Deputy Head of Sotheby's London. He moved to New York in 2005 and participated in many of the firm's high value and important sales of property from private collections, including works from the Man Ray Estate, the Collection of Mrs Walter Buhl Ford III and the Collection of Stanley J. Seeger. During his time with Sotheby’s, Di Donna also held positions as Vice Chairman of Sotheby's Worldwide, Senior Specialist and Head of Sotheby's Impressionist & Modern Art Evening Sales.

Throughout his career, he has been involved in many landmark auctions, including the sale of Kazimir Malevich's Suprematist Composition, which sold for $60m in 2008.

== Connoisseurship in Surrealist Art ==
Di Donna focuses on Surrealism and modern/postwar art, curating exhibitions at the galleries and arranging purchases by museums and private buyers.

Notable surveys, group shows and monographic exhibitions arranged by Di Donna include: Dali: The Great Years (2026), Enchanted Reverie: Klee and Calder (2024), Surrealism in Mexico (2019), Paths to the Absolute (2016), Warhol: Jackie (2014), René Magritte, Dangerous Liaisons (2011); André Masson, The Mythology of Desire: Masterworks from 1925 to 1945 (2012); Jean Arp: A Collection of Wood Reliefs and Collages (2012), and Paul Delvaux (2013), which was curated in close collaboration with the Paul Delvaux Foundation, and was also displayed in London.

== Gallery Enterprises ==
In 2010, he founded Blain|Di Donna with London Contemporary Art dealer Harry Blain. In April 2015, Di Donna assumed full ownership, founding Di Donna Galleries, which formally evolved into Pace Di Donna Schrader Galleries in 2026.

He is also the co-founder of Sélavy by Di Donna, a collaboration with art advisor Christina Floyd Di Donna that presents curated vignettes which unite fine art and design spanning mediums, time periods, and cultures.

In 2025, he co-founded Pace Di Donna Schrader Galleries with art dealer David Schrader and Pace Gallery. The gallery made its public debut at TEFAF New York 2026 with a presentation of masterworks by artists including Alexander Calder, Eugene Delacroix, Willem de Kooning, and Pablo Picasso, among others. The global secondary market gallery specializes in the exhibition, sale, and stewardship of masterworks from the 19^{th} and 20^{th} centuries, and participates in art fairs including TEFAF and Art Basel.

== Personal life ==
Emmanuel Di Donna is married and currently lives in New York.
