= Frank Kelly (footballer, born 1950) =

Australian rules footballer

Personal information
- Full name: Frank Kelly
- Born: 7 August 1950
- Died: 5 June 2006 (aged 55)
- Original team: Army Apprentices Football Club
- Height: 179 cm (5 ft 10 in)
- Weight: 76 kg (168 lb)

Playing career^{1}
Years	Club	Games (Goals)
1971	Richmond	2 (1)
- ^{1} Playing statistics correct to the end of 1971.

Frank Kelly (7 August 1950 – 5 June 2006) was a former Australian rules footballer who played with Richmond in the Victorian Football League (VFL).
