= Jean Bony =

French medieval architectural historian (1908–1995)

- Born: 1 November 1908; Le Mans, France
- Died: July 7, 1995 (aged 86); Brisbane, Australia
- Spouse: Clotilde Roure (m. 1936; died 1942) Elizabeth Mary England (m. 1953)
- Children: 1

Academic background
- Education: Lycée Louis-le-Grand; University of the Sorbonne

Academic work
- Discipline: Architectural history
- Sub-discipline: Gothic architecture
- Institutions: Eton College (1937-39, 1945-46); Institut français du Royaume-Uni (1946-61); University of Cambridge (1958-61); University of California at Berkeley (1962-80)

Jean Victor Edmond Paul Marie Bony (1908–1995) was a French medieval architectural historian specialising in Gothic architecture. He was Slade Professor of Fine Art at the University of Cambridge from 1958 to 1961, Fellow of St John's College, Cambridge, and Professor of Art at the University of California at Berkeley, from 1962 to 1980.

== Early life and education ==
Bony born in Le Mans, France on 1 November 1908 to Henri Bony and Marie Normand Bony. He attended the Lycée Louis-le-Grand, Paris, before going to the University of the Sorbonne in 1929, where he studied under Henri Focillon, receiving his first degree in History and Geography in 1933. In 1935, he changed his focus to art history under Focillon's influence, and received a two-year fellowship from the Sorbonne to carry out research. He began to travel throughout Europe, in particular in England, in order to write his doctoral thesis on the influence of Norman architecture on gothic architecture. He found favourable ground for his research and spent all of his career in English-speaking countries.

== Professional work ==
Bony taught French as an Assistant Master at Eton College from 1937 to 1939. On the outbreak of the Second World War he returned to France and served in the French Army; he was captured, and spent from 1940 to 1943 in prisoner-of-war camps, where he continued his interest in medieval architecture, writing articles, compiling notes, making detailed drawings, and giving educational talks to his fellow-prisoners. He left the French Army as a first lieutenant in 1944. Returning to the UK after the war, he taught briefly at Eton again (1945 to 1946), then became a Reader at the French Institute in London (1946-1961). In parallel with this he was a Visiting Lecturer (1948-1958) and external examiner (1950-1958) at the Courtauld Institute of Art, University of London. With George Zarnecki of the Courtauld he began a project in around 1960 to compile an exhaustive inventory of Romanesque sculpture in the British Isles, which Zarnecki eventually completed after Bony's death. No doubt through Zarnecki's influence, Bony contributed photographs to the Courtauld Institute's Conway Library, an extensive archive of architectural images currently undergoing a digitisation process. Bony has had a great influence on medieval scholarship within The Courtauld Institute, well beyond his time spent there, and still evident in the work of recent and current Courtauld scholars.

He was Slade Professor of Fine Art at the University of Cambridge from 1958 to 1961). In the USA he was Focillon Fellow and visiting Lecturer at Yale University in 1949, and in 1962 he obtained a chair in the History of Art at the University of California at Berkeley, spending a great deal of his time building the department's collection of slides and photographs. He retired from Berkeley in 1980.

In France he lectured briefly in the History of Art at the University of Lille (1961-1962), and in 1978 he was Visiting Fellow at the Humanities Research Centre of the Australian National University in Canberra.

After his retirement he held the following positions:

- 1982: Kress Professorship at the Center for Advanced Study in the Visual Arts at the National Gallery of Art
- 1983: Visiting Mellon Professor at the University of Pittsburgh
- 1984-1987: Meadows Professor at Southern Methodist University
- 1988: Getty Lecturer at the University of Southern California

A member of the formalist tradition, Bony was the first historian to rigorously describe the structure of the “thick hollow wall”, the starting point of a general history of the constitution of the Gothic style in architecture where Norman works play a key role.

== Awards and recognitions ==
- Honorary MA from Cambridge in 1958
- Elected a Fellow of St John's College
- Guggenheim Fellowship in 1981
- Winner of the Haskins Gold Medal of the Medieval Academy of America, linked to the publication of his book, The English Decorated Style (1979)
- Awarded the gold medal of the Commonwealth Club of San Francisco in 1984, linked to the publication of his book French Gothic Architecture of the 12th and 13th Centuries (1983)
- Elected Honorary Fellow of the Society of Antiquaries of London
- Corresponding Fellow of the British Academy
- Vice-president of the Royal Archaeological Institute (Great Britain), 1955-1961
- Received a Distinguished Teaching Award in 1975
- First recipient of the Constantine Panunzio Distinguished Emeriti Award of the University of California in 1983

== Memberships ==
Bony was a member of the following professional societies:

- Société Française d'Archéologie
- Société Nationale des Antiquaires de France
- British Archaeological Association
- College Art Association
- Society of Architectural Historians

== Personal life ==
Bony married Clotilde Roure in 1936, and they had a daughter, Claire. Clotilde died in 1942. He married Elizabeth Mary England, an Australian, in Kensington, SW London, in 1953.

Bony died in Brisbane, Australia, 7 July 1995.

== Selected publications ==
- La technique normande du mur épais à l’époque romane, Paris: Société Française d’Archéologie, 1939.
- Notre-Dame de Mantes, Paris: Editions du Cerf, 1947.
- French influences on the origins of English Gothic architecture, Worcester, London: Trinity Press, 1949.
- French Cathedrals (with Martin Hurlimann and Peter Meyer), London: Thames and Hudson, 1951.
- (Edited and with an Introduction by Jean Bony), Henri Focillon, The Art of the West in the Middle Ages, Volumes 1 and 2, London: Phaidon Press, 1963.
- The English decorated style: Gothic architecture transformed, 1250-1350. Oxford: Phaidon Press, 1979.
- French Gothic architecture of the 12th and 13th centuries. University of California Press, Berkeley, 1983.
