= Amy Plum =

French-American author

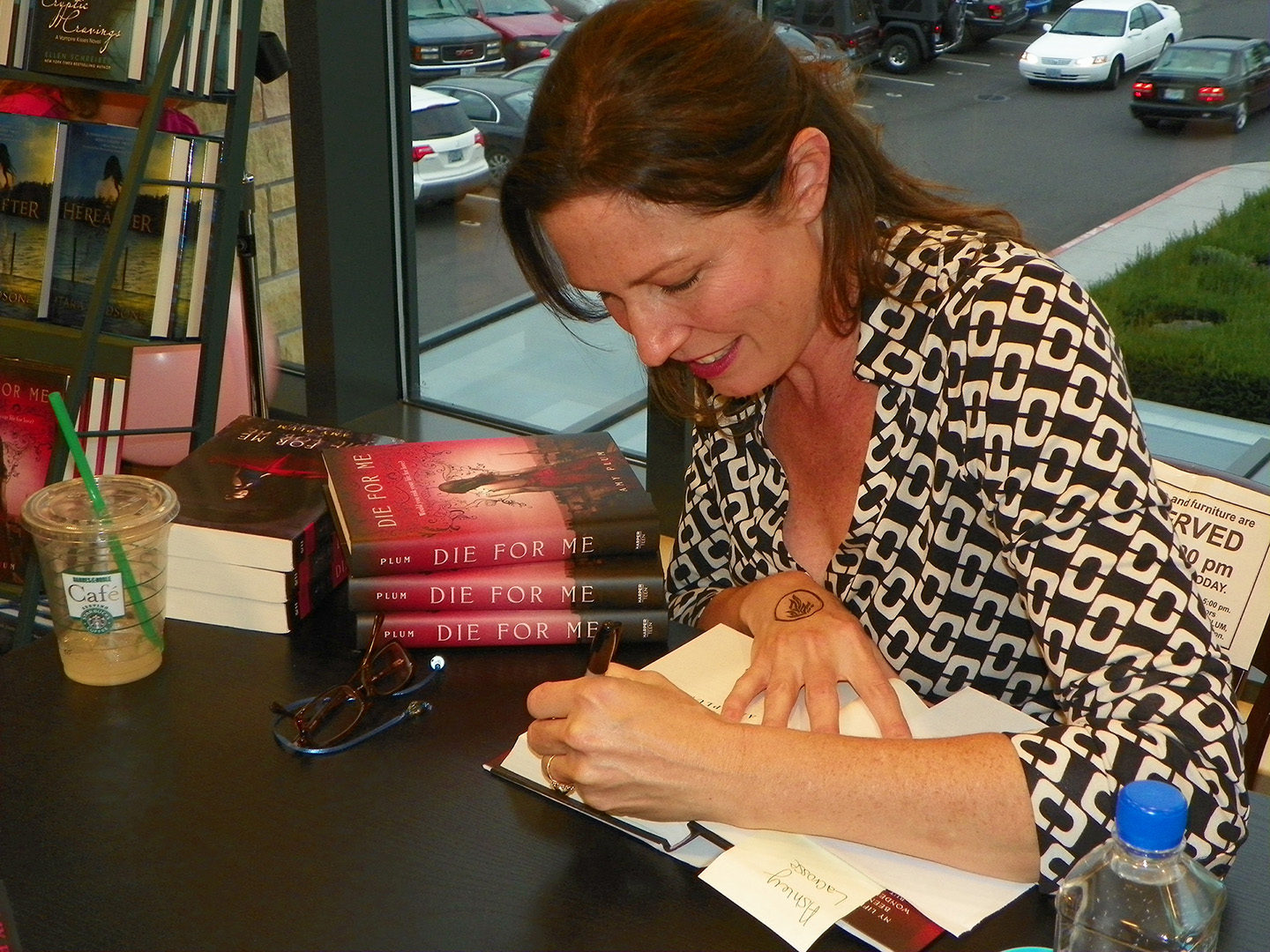
- Born: 1967 (age 58–59); Portland, Oregon, U.S.
- Education: Wheaton College; The Courtauld Institute of Art (MA)
- Occupation: Writer
- Writing career
- Period: 2011–present
- Genre: Young adult fiction
- Notable work: Die for Me series (2011-13)
- Website: amyplumbooks.com

Amy Plum (born 1967) is an American-born French young-adult fiction writer, best known for her Die for Me series.

== Early life and education ==
Plum was born in Portland, Oregon, and raised in Birmingham, Alabama. After receiving a bachelor's degree in psychology from Wheaton College in Illinois, she lived in Paris, London (where she received a master of arts in medieval art history from the Courtauld Institute) and New York, before settling in France.

== Career ==
=== Die for Me series (2011-13) ===
Plum's first book, A Year in the Vines, went unpublished, but it helped her acquire an agent. Her first published novel, Die for Me, came out in 2011. Die for Me, which is the first novel of the series alternately known as the Die for Me or Revenants series, introduces the mythology of a group of zombie-like, reanimating creatures called revenants. The young-adult novel recounts the attempts of Kate Mercier, a 16-year-old American living in Paris, to move on after the death of her parents in a car crash, and her love story with one of the revenants, Vincent. Publishers Weekly called it "an immersing, franchise-ready story." An International Bestseller, Die for Me was voted to the Summer 2011 Indie Next list, was The Romance Times top pick, and a 2013-14 South Carolina Young Adult Book Award Nominee. It is translated into German, French, Italian, Portuguese, Bulgarian, Czech, Norwegian, Russian, Slovak, Polish, Spanish, and Turkish.

The sequel, Until I Die, was published in 2012 and is translated into German, French, Italian, Portuguese, Bulgarian, Czech, Norwegian, Spanish, and Turkish. It was followed by a novella, Die for Her, which has been referred to as "Die for Me 2.5", and is translated into German, French, Spanish, and Turkish. The series was completed in 2013 with If I Should Die, wrapping up the love story of Kate and Vincent. RT Book Reviews gave If I Should Die four-and-a-half stars, praising it as "another fantastic tale." If I Should Die is translated into German, French, Italian, Portuguese, Norwegian, Spanish, and Turkish. At her readers' request, Plum has added two more novellas to the series, Die Once More (2015), is translated into French, Spanish, and Turkish. And To Die For (2021), which takes place five years after the rest of the series. A digital compendium for the series entitled Inside the World of Die for Me was released in February 2016.

=== After the End series (2014-15) ===
After the End was published in 2014. The first of a two-book series by Plum, it begins in the Alaskan wilderness in a possibly post-apocalyptic world, and tells the story of 17-year-old Juneau, who has mystical powers. After she returns home to find her entire village has been abducted, she searches for them with the assistance of Miles, a rich, spoiled teenager. The book received a starred review in Publishers Weekly.

The sequel, Until the Beginning, was published in 2015. It received strong reviews from Kirkus, Booklist, and a 4 1/2-star rating from RT Book Reviews.

After the End and Until the Beginning are both translated into Turkish.

=== Dreamfall series (2017-18) ===
Dreamfall the first of a YA horror duology was published in 2017 by HarperTeen. Its sequel, "Neverwake" was published in 2018. In the books, a radical experiment to cure chronic insomnia goes wrong, and its seven teenage test subjects are plunged into a shared coma populated by one another's nightmares; those who die in the dream will also die in real life.

The books have been optioned for television by DiGa Studios.

The series is translated into Hungarian and Turkish, and has received enthusiastic reviews from School Library Journal, VOYA (Voice of Youth Advocates), Kirkus, and Publishers Weekly.

== Personal life ==
Plum resides in Paris, France, with her two children.

== Publications ==
Revenants Series

- Die for Me (HarperTeen, May 10, 2011)
- Until I Die (HarperTeen, May 8, 2012)
- Die for Her: A Die for Me Novella (HarperTeen Impulse, April 2, 2013)
- If I Should Die (HarperTeen, May 7, 2013)
- Die Once More: A Die for Me Novella (HarperTeen, February 3, 2015)
- Inside the World of Die For Me (HarperTeen, February 9, 2016)
- To Die For: A Die for Me Novella (Signum Bardia Books, December 14, 2021)

After the End Series

- After the End (HarperTeen, May 6, 2014)
- Until the Beginning (Harper Teen, May 5, 2015)

Dreamfall Series

- Dreamfall (HarperTeen, 2017)
- Neverwake (HarperTeen, 2018)

An Alphabet of Paris Zombies (CreateSpace Independent Publishing Platform, August 31, 2016)
