= Queen Elizabeth Park =

Queen Elizabeth Park is the name of:

- Queen Elizabeth Park, Kapiti Coast, New Zealand
- Queen Elizabeth Park, Masterton, New Zealand
- Queen Elizabeth Park, British Columbia, Canada (in Vancouver)
- Queen Elizabeth National Park, Uganda
- Queen Elizabeth Park, North Saskatchewan River valley parks system, Edmonton, Canada
- Queen Elizabeth Park, Glace Bay, Nova Scotia, Canada
- Queen Elizabeth Park Concord, New South Wales Australia

== See also ==
- Queen Elizabeth Olympic Park, London, UK
- Queen Elizabeth Provincial Park, Alberta, Canada
- Queen Elizabeth II Wildlands Provincial Park, Ontario, Canada
- Queen Elizabeth II Park, site of former sports stadium, New Zealand
- Queen Elizabeth Park Road, Edmonton, Canada
