= Carolyn Marino Malone =

American medievalist and academic

Carolyn Marino Malone is an American medievalist and academic. She is professor of art history and history at USC Dornsife College, Los Angeles, California, with a PhD in Art History and Medieval Studies (1973) from the University of California, Berkeley. Her research interests are English and French Romanesque and Gothic architecture and sculpture. She has published books on sculptural finds at Canterbury Cathedral, the abbey of St Bénigne in Dijon, the façade of Wells Cathedral, and monastic life in the Middle Ages. She served as vice-president (1996–1997) and President (1999) of Art Historians of Southern California; Domestic Advisor to the Board of Directors of the International Center of Medieval Art (1984–1987); and was on the board of directors of the Medieval Association of the Pacific (1986–1989). She is a member of the Society of Architectural Historians.

== Education ==
Malone spent her childhood in Kansas, USA. In 1963 she went to Paris to study at the French Language Institute, followed by a Junior Year in Bordeaux in 1964. She took her first degree at the University of Kansas, Lawrence (BA History of Art, 1966), then went on to the University of California, Berkeley (MA, 1968), with a thesis on “Monastic Planning After the Plan of St. Gall: Tradition and Change” (advisor Walter Horn), followed by PhD research, completed in 1973, with a dissertation on 'West English Gothic Architecture: 1175-1250'. Her advisor was the French art historian and specialist in Gothic architecture, Jean Bony.

== Academic appointments ==
Her first academic appointment was as visiting lecturer in the Department of Art History, University of Michigan, Ann Arbor (1972), followed by a Visiting Lecturer post at Harvard University (Carpenter Center for the Visual Arts, 1973). Three assistant professor posts followed, at the University of Massachusetts, Amherst (1974), Vassar College (1974–1975), and Princeton University (1975–1981). Moving on to the University of Southern California, she was assistant professor in the School of Fine Arts (1981–1983), then associate professor, History of Art, (1984–2008), and then professor and chair of art history (2009–2012). A secondary appointment in parallel with this was Professor, History of Art, also at USC (2008–2019).

== Fellowships, awards and grants ==
Malone has received numerous fellowships and awards throughout her career, including two from the University of Kansas in the 1960s, three from the University of California, Berkeley, in the 1960s and 1970s, and two from the Courtauld Institute of Art in London (the Samuel H. Kress Foundation Art Fellowship, 1969–1970, renewed for 1970–1971). Photographs by her are held in the Conway Library archive at the Courtauld, which is currently undergoing a digitisation project, Courtauld Connects. Post-doctoral awards included an Andrew Mellon Post-Doctoral Fellowship from the University of Pittsburgh, 1980–1981, and an American Council of Learned Societies Fellowship for Research on English Gothic, 1981.

She received three awards for research on her book on St Bénigne (1998 and 2002). While at Princeton, she received a grant from the National Endowment for the Humanities to support an archaeological investigation of Saint Benigne, Dijon, France, an 11th-century church.

She was awarded a grant while at USC by the Albert and Elaine Borchard Foundation Grant to organise a conference on "Medieval Customaries and Monastic Life" in 2007.

She was awarded the Elliot Prize from the Medieval Academy of America in 1982.

Malone was awarded the USC Phi Kappa Phi Faculty Recognition Award in 2010 for her book, Saint-Bénigne de Dijon en l’an mil.

== Publications ==
=== Books ===
Facade as Spectacle: Ritual and Ideology at Wells Cathedral (2004), in which she interprets the Gothic façade of Wells as part of political discourse and liturgical innovation in England around 1220.

Two books on the pre-Romanesque church of Saint-Bénigne, built between 1001 and 1018 in Dijon, France: Saint-Bénigne et sa rotonde: archéologie d’une église bourguignonne de l’an mil (2008) and Saint-Bénigne de Dijon en l’an mil, “totius Galliae basilicis mirabiliorem”: Interprétation politique, liturgique et théologique (2009, digital version 2016). Malone is currently working on a Digital Archives Project documenting her 1970s excavations of the building.

In Twelfth-Century Sculptural Finds at Canterbury Cathedral and the Cult of Thomas Becket (2019) Malone reconstructs finds from the restoration of the Perpendicular Cloister as architectural screens that were built around the time of Becket's canonisation (1173) to manage pilgrimage to his tomb and the site of his assassination. In doing so, Malone was the first person to study the way in which the crowds of pilgrims to Canterbury were accommodated during the fifty years before Becket's body was moved from the crypt to a shrine in the Trinity Chapel. Reconstruction of these screens provides new evidence about early pilgrimage in a monastic site, and also establishes unusual sculptural activity during a previously unknown building phase at Canterbury Cathedral.

Malone was co-editor, with Clark Maines, of Consuetudines et Regulae: Sources for Monastic Life in the Middle Ages and Early Modern Period (2014).

=== Book chapters ===
- 'Architecture as Evidence for Liturgical Performance' in Understanding Medieval Liturgy: Essays in Interpretation, London: Routledge, 2016.
- 'Les implications sensorielles de l'architecture et de la liturgie au Moyen Âge' in Les Cinq Sens au Moyen Âge, Paris: Editions du Cerf, 2016.
- 'Interprétation des pratiques liturgiques à Saint Bénigne de Dijon d’après ses coutumiers d’inspiration clunisienne' in Dead of Night and End of Day, Disciplina monastica, Turnhout: Brepols, 2005.
- 'Cistercian Design in the Choir and Transept of Wells Cathedral' in Perspectives for an Architecture of Solitude, Essays on Cistercians, Art and Architecture in Honour of Peter Fergusson, Turnhout & Citeaux, 2004.
- 'Saint-Bénigne in Dijon as Exemplum of Rodulfus Glaber's Metaphoric ‘White Mantle’ in The White Mantle of Churches, Turnhout: Brepols, 2003.
- 'L'espace occidental et la contre abside de l'an mil de Saint Bénigne de Dijon' in Avant-nefs et espaces d’accueil dans l’Eglise entre le IVe et XIIe siècle, Auxerre, 2002.
- 'L'église de Guillaume de Volpiano et sa lien avec la rotonde' in Guillaume de Volpiano et l'architecture des rotondes: Actes du Colloque Europeen, Guillaume de Volpiano, Dijon, 1996.
- 'The Plan and its Effect on Later Monastic Planning' (with W. Horn) in Walter Horn, The Plan of St. Gall, A Study in the Architecture, Economy, and Life of a Paradigmatic Carolingian Monastery, Berkeley, California, 1979.
