= Graham W. J. Beal =

Director of the Detroit Institute of Arts

Graham W. J. Beal was the Director, President and CEO of the Detroit Institute of Arts, from 1999 to 2015.

== Background ==
Beal was born in Stratford-on-Avon, England. He has degrees in English and Art History from the University of Manchester and the Courtauld Institute of Art.

== Early career ==
Prior to his tenure at the DIA, he was director of the Los Angeles County Museum of Art from 1996 to 1999. He was director of the Joslyn Art Museum in Omaha, Nebraska, from 1989 to 1996 and served as chief curator at the San Francisco Museum of Modern Art from 1984 to 1989.

== Detroit Institute of Arts ==
Beal was hired in 1999 as the Director and President of the Detroit Institute of Arts (DIA). During his early days, Beal was embroiled in several controversies over the suppression of contemporary exhibitions, despite his identification as an advocate of contemporary art. The first example of this was in 1999, when Beal shut down an exhibit Jef Bourgeau had been invited to create. Beal called Bourgeau to his office, while museum staffers acting under Beal's orders padlocked the exhibit.

In 2012, the board of directors increased Beal's salary from $455,453 to $514,000 annually. The same year the DIA asked voters in Wayne, Macomb and Oakland Counties to approve an increase on their property taxes to help the DIA solve its financial problems and keep its doors open. Beal also received a $50,000 bonus in 2012 plus another 50,000 in 2013.

Initially, the raises and loans were not made public. In 2014, the DIA filed tax returns for 2012 which disclosed Beal's raise and bonus. The disclosure caused much anger among Wayne, Macomb and Oakland County taxpayers. "The public rallied around the DIA, and this is the thanks they got?" Oakland County Executive L. Brooks Patterson asked. Oakland County Commissioners threatened to stop Oakland County's participation in the DIA millage. On November 5, 2014, the DIA board repaid the museum for Beal's 2013 bonus with the board chairman Eugene Gargaro apologizing for "mistakes which we regret".

On January 8, 2015, Beal announced he was stepping down on June 30. Two months later, Beal's pay continues to generate negative headlines for the DIA. Oakland County officials continue to be at the forefront of opposition to a retroactive raise for Beal. Lawmakers want to make the DIA subject to the Freedom of Information Act.
