= Esmé Whittaker =

British art historian and curator

Esmé Whittaker is a British art historian and curator of art collections at English Heritage.

Whittaker attended the University of Bristol, obtaining a bachelor's degree in art. She received a master's degree, and then a doctorate from the Courtauld Institute of Art for her dissertation The Arts and Crafts house in the Lake District: buildings, landscapes and communities, under the supervision of Professor Caroline Arscott. This work elucidated the influence of William Wordsworth and John Ruskin on the Arts and Crafts houses in the Lake District, and has been lauded.

Her book, co-written with Matthew Hyde, Arts and Crafts Houses in the Lake District won the 2015 Bookends Prizes for Arts and Literature.

Whittaker worked at the Word & Image Department of the Victoria and Albert Museum. She also assisted in exhibitions, including The Cult of Beauty - The Aesthetic Movement 1860-1900 (2011).

In 2011, Whittaker curated an exhibition on William Morris at Two Temple Place.

In 2017, she appeared in the BBC Four documentary In Search of Arcadia.

Whittaker is a curator for the English Heritage's Chiswick House and Marble Hill House.

== Selected works ==
- Whittaker, Esmé (2010). "Self-Conscious Regionalism: Dan Gibson and the Arts and Crafts House in the Lake District". In Guillery, Peter (ed.). Built from Below: British Architecture and the Vernacular. Routledge. pp. 99–122. ISBN 9781136943140.
- Whittaker, Esmé (2011). "Owen Jones". In Orr, Lynn F.; Calloway, Stephen (eds.). The Cult of Beauty: The Victorian Avant-Garde 1860-1900. Victoria & Albert Museum.
- Whittaker, Esmé (2011). William Morris - Story, Memory, Myth. Two Temple Place. ISBN 978-0957062801.
