= Allan Braham =

English art historian

- Born: 19 August 1937; Croydon, Surrey
- Died: 3 March 2011 (aged 73); London
- Education: PhD, 1967
- Alma mater: Courtauld Institute of Art
- Occupations: Art historian, architectural historian, author and art gallery curator
- Employer(s): National Gallery, London

Allan John Witney Braham (19 August 1937 – 3 March 2011) was an English art historian, architectural historian, author and art gallery curator. He was Deputy Director at the National Gallery, London.

== Biography ==
Braham was born in Croydon, Surrey, to Dudley Braham and Florence (née Mears). He studied at Dulwich College in south London, then at the Courtauld Institute of Art, University of London, gaining a BA in 1960 and a PhD (on François Mansart's drawings for the Louvre) in 1967. Photographs contributed by Allan Braham to the Courtauld Institute of Art's Conway Library are currently being digitised as part of the Courtauld Connects project.

Braham worked at the National Gallery, London, first as Assistant Keeper (1962-1973), then as Deputy Keeper (1973-1978), then as Keeper (1978-1989) and Deputy Director (1978-1992). Braham coordinated numerous exhibitions, and contributed to the accompanying catalogues. He was sole or co-author on books on art and architecture, and numerous scholarly articles, in particular for The Burlington Magazine, and for the Gazette des Beaux-Arts in France.

Braham married Helen Clare Butterworth on 15 June 1963 (marriage dissolved in 2004); they had two daughters and lived in North London. Braham died in London in 2011.

== Awards ==
In 1980 Braham was awarded both the Sir Banister Fletcher Prize and the Alice Davis Hitchcock Award for his book The Architecture of the French Enlightenment.

== Selected publications ==
=== Books ===
- Dürer, London: Spring Books, 1965, 1967.
- Murillo, The Masters, London: Knowledge Publications, 1966.
- The National Gallery in London: Italian painting of the high renaissance, Munich: Knorr & Hirth, 1971.
- Velásquez, Themes and painters in the National Gallery, London: National Gallery, 1972.
- Rubens, Themes and painters in the National Gallery, London: National Gallery, 1972.
- The Leonardo-Cartoon: a short account of its history and significance, London: National Gallery, 1973.
- Funeral decorations in early eighteenth century Rome, London: Victoria and Albert Museum, 1975.
- Architecture, London: National Gallery, 1975.
- The Rokeby Venus, Velázquez, London: National Gallery, 1976.
- The Architecture of the French Enlightenment, London: Thames and Hudson, 1980, 1989.
- El Greco to Goya: the taste for Spanish paintings in Britain and Ireland ... (book with introduction and catalogue by Allan Braham), London: National Gallery, 1981.
- Italian paintings of the sixteenth century, London: National Gallery in association with William Collins, 1985.

=== Books with co-authors ===
- L'église du dome, Allan Braham and Anthony Blunt, London: Warburg Institute, 1960.
- The Spanish School by Neil MacLaren, 2nd edition revised by Allan Braham, London: National Gallery, 1970.
- François Mansart, Allan Braham and Peter R Smith, London: Zwemmer, 1973. The book was developed from both writers' PhD theses for the Courtauld Institute.
- Carlo Fontana: the drawings at Windsor Castle, Allan Braham and Hellmut Hager, Royal Library (Windsor Castle), London: Zwemmer, 1977.
- Piranesi as archaeologist and French architecture in the late eighteenth century, Allan Braham and Anthony Blunt, Rome: Edizioni dell'Elefante, 1978.

=== Exhibition catalogues ===
- Wright of Derby: Mr & Mrs Coltman (exhibition organised and booklet written by Allan Braham), London: National Gallery, 1986.
- Giovanni Battista Moroni: 400th anniversary exhibition (introduction and catalogue by Allan Braham), National Gallery, London: Hillingdon Press, 1978.
- The National Gallery lends Italian Renaissance portraits, an exhibition organised in conjunction with the Arts Council of Great Britain (introduction and catalogue by Allan Braham), London: National Gallery, 1979.

=== Articles ===
- 'Mansart studies: 1: the Val-de-Grâce', The Burlington Magazine (ed. Benedict Nicolson), pp. 351–363, 1963.
- 'Mansart studies: 4: the Château of Gesvres', The Burlington Magazine (ed. Benedict Nicolson), Vol. 106, pp. 359–363, 1964.
- 'Archbishop Fernando de Valdés y Llanos: the problem of Velázquez's portrait', The Burlington Magazine (ed. Benedict Nicolson), Vol. 110, pp. 401–404, 1968.
- 'Drawings for Soufflot's Sainte Geneviève', The Burlington Magazine (ed. Benedict Nicolson), Vol. 113, pp. 582–590, 1971.
- 'A reappraisal of "The introduction of the cult of Cybele at Rome" by Mantegna', The Burlington Magazine (ed. Benedict Nicolson), Vol. 115, pp. 457–463, 1973.
- 'The Emperor Sigismund and the Santa Maria Maggiore Altar-piece', The Burlington Magazine (ed. Benedict Nicolson), Vol. 122, pp. 106–112, 1980.
- 'Murillo's portrait of Don Justino de Neve', The Burlington Magazine (ed. Benedict Nicolson), Vol. 122, pp. 192–194, 1980.

=== Articles with co-authors ===
- 'Louis le Vau's projects for the Louvre and the Colonnade: 2', Allan Braham and Mary Whiteley, Gazette des beaux-arts, pp. 347–362, 1964.
- 'Mansart studies: 5: the church of the Minimes', Allan Braham and Peter Smith, The Burlington Magazine (ed. Benedict Nicolson), Vol. 107, pp. 123–132, 1965.
- 'François Mansart's work at the Hôtel de Chavigny', Allan Braham and Peter Smith, Gazette des beaux-arts, pp. 317–330, 1965.
