= Frank Kelly (footballer, born 1921) =

Australian rules footballer

Personal information
- Full name: Francis Kelly
- Born: 8 September 1921; Newcastle upon Tyne, England
- Died: 27 December 1974 (aged 53); Nambour, Queensland
- Original team: Wonthaggi / Parkside
- Height: 179 cm (5 ft 10 in)
- Weight: 87 kg (192 lb)

Playing career^{1}
Years	Club	Games (Goals)
1941, 1944	Footscray	8 (0)
- ^{1} Playing statistics correct to the end of 1944.

Frank Kelly (8 September 1921 – 27 December 1974) was an Australian rules footballer who played with Footscray in the Victorian Football League (VFL).
