= Christopher P. Monkhouse =

American architectural historian (1947–2021)

Christopher Pruyn Monkhouse (1947 – 2021) was an architectural historian, a scholar of the decorative arts, and a curator who worked in institutions across America. He was the founding curator of the Heinz Architectural Galleries at Carnegie Museum of Art in Pittsburgh and, in 2017, upon his retirement, he had held the post of Eloise W. Martin curator and Chair of the Department of European Decorative Arts at the Art Institute of Chicago for ten years.

== Early life and education ==
Christopher Monkhouse was born in Portland, Maine on 2 April 1947 to William A. Monkhouse, M.D. and Agnes Pruyn Linder Monkhouse. He had two brothers, William and Frederick, who both predeceased him. Christopher attended Waynflete School, graduated from Deerfield Academy in 1965, and, in 1966, studied English country houses at the summer school run by the Attingham Trust at Attingham Park in Shropshire, England.

From 1965 to 1969, Monkhouse read for a degree in History of Art (BA) at the University of Pennsylvania and, upon being awarded a Thouron British American Fellowship, he travelled to London to study for an MA at the Courtauld Institute of Art, undertaking his dissertation on 19th century railway hotels supervised by Nikolaus Pevsner. It was during this time he first visited Ireland to study the hotels on the Grand Canal. He later wrote a chapter, Railway Hotels, for a 1979 book on railway architecture.

== Career ==
Christopher Monkhouse worked on his first exhibition while still at secondary school, curating a 1964 exhibit on Maine politics with two other members of Deerfield's historical society and, as he later observed; "I had the good fortune to know what I wanted to do professionally very early in life. I curated my first art exhibition at Deerfield, and I have not deviated from that career track since."

Monkhouse remained in London after completing his master's degree and worked at the Victoria and Albert Museum, the world's largest museum of applied and decorative arts and design, before returning to the States in 1975 as visiting lecturer at Brown University. His first curatorial appointment was in the summer of 1976 when he became curator of European and American decorative arts at the Museum of Art at Rhode Island School of Design where he served for the next 15 years. One of the many exhibitions he curated, Gorham: Masterpieces in Metal was reviewed in the New York Times in 1983 and was described as 'an impressive survey of Providence's illustrious 152-year- old metal-fabricating industry'.

From 1991 to 1995 Christopher Monkhouse was the founding curator of the Heinz Architectural Galleries at Carnegie Museum of Art and, reflecting his life-long interest in architecture, laid the foundations of an architectural resource that encompasses a collection of over 6000 objects. His own house in Ben Avon, Pennsylvania was also like a museum with the walls covered in architectural drawings. He moved his own extensive collection of art, antiques, books and architectural drawings to Minnesota when he was appointed James Ford Bell Curator of Decorative Arts, Sculpture, Architecture Design and Craft at the Minneapolis Institute of Art in 1995. One of the major exhibitions that Monkhouse curated was the 2004 exhibition Currents of Change: Art and Life Along the Mississippi River, 1850–1861, with Jason T. Busch and Janet L. Whitmore, in which he merged his interest in the poetry of Henry Wadsworth Longfellow, a fellow Portland native, and the culture of the American Midwest. Lynsi Spaulding, in a review for the journal Nineteenth-Century Art Worldwide, said the exhibition offered 'a fresh perspective of the River and the steamboat as the primary conduits for both the necessities of commerce and the propagation of artistic style' and concluded that the curators were owed 'a debt of gratitude for tackling such a complicated era and presenting the diverse themes with a sense of maturity and sensitive comprehension.'

In 2007 Monkhouse was appointed Eloise Martin Curator and Chair of the department of European Decorative Arts at the Art Institute of Chicago. Upon being approached to take up the post and appreciating that he was approaching the last decade of his career he asked himself; "Have I done everything I want to? This is a chance to work with an extraordinary collection in a great museum. Who could ask for anything more?" One of his tasks was to oversee the reinstallation of one of America's top decorative arts collections in a new wing at the institute designed by Renzo Piano; an architect whose work was well known to Monkhouse since the first exhibition he curated when the Heinz Architectural Galleries opened in 1993 was a show inspired by the work of Renzo Piano incorporating computer technology; an innovative idea at the time.

Monkhouse's first visit to Ireland way back in the 1960s when, by the nature of his research, he became involved with the Irish Georgian Society coupled with his meeting Desmond Fitzgerald, 29th Knight of Glin, while he was working at the Victoria and Albert Museum in London, fuelled his interest in Ireland and its art and craft. Over the years Monkhouse visited Ireland many times and continued a lifelong friendship with Desmond Fitzgerald with whom he often discussed the possibility of an exhibition of Irish art. It is therefore not surprising that the culmination of his distinguished curating career was the much-acclaimed exhibition Ireland: Crossroads of Art and Design, 1690–1840, held at the Art Institute of Chicago, that "triumphantly put the visual arts of eighteenth-century Ireland onto the 'world stage'." The exhibition opened to the public on St Patrick's Day 2015, and was dedicated to the memory of the Knight of Glin, who was represented at the launch by his widow Olda and their daughters. In the year prior to the exhibition opening, Christopher Monkhouse, together with other members of staff, met the President of Ireland, Michael D. Higgins who visited the Art Institute of Chicago on the last day of a five-day official visit to the United States in April 2014.

Generous with his time to friends and colleagues, Monkhouse was also a generous donator of gifts to various institutions over the years, for example, the Rhodes Island School of Design museum (RISD) has innumerable items donated by Monkhouse as diverse as a 1960 Lark Ladle by John Prip to an American button containing a portrait of a young man dating back to the 1800s. Another John Prip design was gifted by him to the Minneapolis Institute of Art as was a Christopher Dresser pitcher, c.1875 and, reflecting his diverse interests and 'boundless intellectual curiosity', some embroidery items, amongst other things, were gifted to the Art Institute, Chicago. While he was studying in London at the Courtauld Institute of Art he also donated photographs to the Conway Library who are in the process of digitising their archive of primarily architectural images as part of the wider Courtauld Connects project.

Christopher Monkhouse received the honour of being elected a fellow of the Society of Antiquaries of London on 2 February 2018 and over his long career was involved with a number of historical and cultural societies such as the American Friends of Attingham, to whom he gave the Annual Fall Lecture in 2014, the Society of Architectural Historians, a member from 1966, and Victoria Mansion; acting on its professional advisory council, to name a few.

== Personal life ==
Christopher Monkhouse retired in 2017, after a long and illustrious career. He has been described as an ebullient tea-drinking story teller and was an avid collector. His homes full of his collections were important to him and one of the regrets, when he moved from Minnesota to Illinois, was that he had to sell his Marcel Breuer house in Saint Paul designed for the ecclesiastical designer Frank Kacmarcik. When he first visited it, Monkhouse said "As soon as I walked in the door, I just knew it was my house, I've never had a piece of architecture speak to me so quickly." Like Kacmarcik he filled its purpose built library with his collection of rare books and invited its former owner, a kindred spirit, to visit and, not unsurprisingly, bearing in mind their mutual interests, Monkhouse and Kacmarcik, who was by then a monk and in his late 80s, got on well. As Monkhouse said "It was nice that he saw in me as the rightful heir, he went to his grave knowing someone loved the house almost as much as he did."

For all his travels, Monkhouse always retained ties to his birth state and had, for a long time, kept a summer home in Machiasport, an 18th-century Colonial house. When he retired, he moved his collection, for the final time, to a former sea-captain's house in Brunswick.

Christopher Monkhouse died from a stroke on January 12, 2021, at Gosnell Memorial Hospice House in Scarborough, Maine.

== Selected publications : exhibition catalogues ==
- Buildings on Paper Rhode Island Architectural Drawings 1825–1945, contributor and editor (with William H. Jordy), Providence, R.I. : Bell Gallery, Brown University,1982
- Americana from the Daphne Farago Collection, (with Carol C. Sanderson), Museum of Art, Providence, R.I. : Museum of Art, Rhode Island School of Design, 1985, ISBN 0-911517-09-X
- American Furniture in Pendleton House, (with Thomas S. Michie and John M. Carpenter), Providence, R.I. : Museum of Art, Rhode Island School of Design, 1986, ISBN 0-911517-44-8
- Furniture in Print : Pattern books from the Redwood Library, (with Thomas S. Michie), Providence, R.I. : Museum of Art, Rhode Island School of Design, 1986
- Currents of Change : Art and Life along the Mississippi River, 1850–1861, (with Jason Busch & Janet Whitmore), Minneapolis, Minn. : Minneapolis Institute of Arts distributed by Bristol : University Presses Marketing, 2004, ISBN 0-8166-4452-7
- Ireland: Crossroads of Art and Design, 1690–1840, contributor (with others) & editor (with William Laffan), Chicago : The Art Institute of Chicago distributed by Yale University Press, 2015, ISBN 978-0-300-21060-6
