= Amanda Simpson (art historian) =

- Born: Amanda Tomlinson; 1942 (age 83–84)

Academic background
- Education: Courtauld Institute of Art
- Thesis: (1978)

Academic work
- Discipline: Art History

Amanda Simpson FSA (née Tomlinson, born 1942), is a British medievalist, author, editor, librarian and art historian. Photographs attributed to her appear in the collection of the Conway Library at the Courtauld Institute of Art, where she worked as Conway Librarian in the 1970s while completing her studies. She completed her PhD at the Courtauld Institute in 1978 on the subject of 14th-century English and Bohemian painting. She became a Fellow of the Society of Antiquaries of London on 5 May 1990.

== Scholarship ==
The connections between English and Bohemian Painting during the Second Half of the Fourteenth Century, PhD thesis, 1978, later published in the series Outstanding theses from the Courtauld Institute of Art, New York: Garland, 1984.

== Publications ==
- Van Eyck: The Complete Works, London: Chaucer Press, 2006, ISBN 9781904449348. The book was reviewed by Annette Lezotte for The Art Book magazine (April 2008).

=== Editor ===
- Medieval architecture and sculpture in Europe. Part 1: Poland, Harvey Miller/Courtauld Institute of Art, University of London, 1976.
- Medieval architecture and sculpture in Europe. Part 2: Prague, Harvey Miller/Courtauld Institute of Art, University of London, 1977.
- Medieval architecture and sculpture in Europe. Part 4: Germany: Nurnberg, Harvey Miller/Courtauld Institute of Art, University of London, 1977.

=== Contributor ===
- The Mediaeval Face, 1974, National Portrait Gallery, London. Simpson wrote the catalogue for the National Portrait Gallery exhibition of the same name which was on display from 21 August 1974 to 12 January 1975. The catalogue includes her own photographs and introductory text.
- Grove Art Online, Oxford University Press, 1996-2003 (entries on Jan of Opava; Master of Trebon; Master of the Vyssi Brod Altar; Osvald, Master; Premyslid; Theodoric, Master; Wurmser of Strasbourg, Nicholas; various Plantagenet English royalty).
- Simpson contributed a photograph to Tan House, Newent, in A History of the County of Gloucester: Volume 12, published by Boydell & Brewer for Victoria County History, Woodbridge, 2010.
