= George Zarnecki =

Polish historian of art

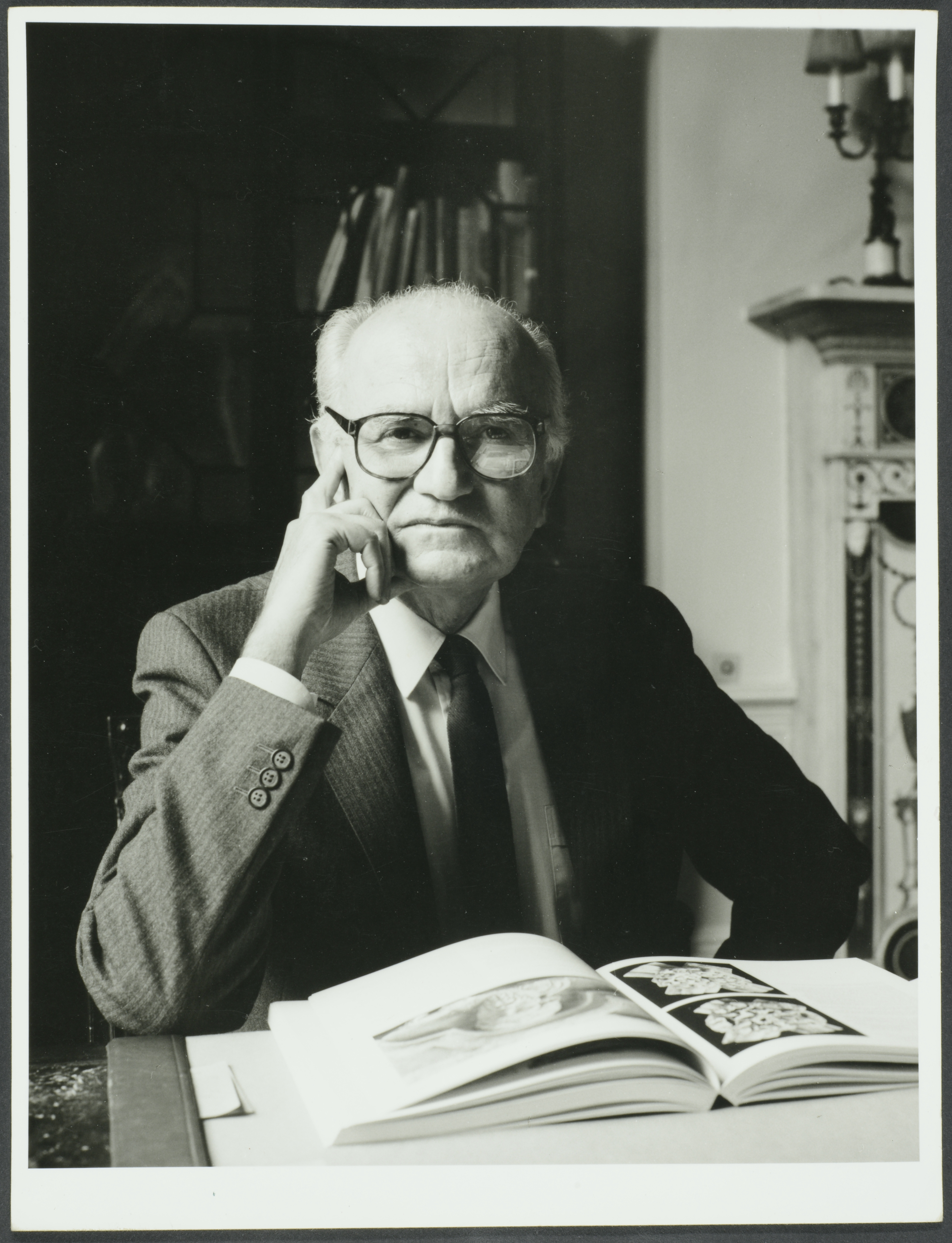
George Zarnecki

George Zarnecki (Polish: Jerzy Żarnecki), CBE, FBA, FSA (12 September 1915 – 8 September 2008) was a Polish Professor of the History of Art. He was a scholar of Medieval art and English Romanesque sculpture, an area of study in which he did pioneering research. From 1961 to 1974 he was a deputy director of the Courtauld Institute of Art, University of London.

== Early life ==
Zarnecki was born in Stara Osota near Chyhyryn, then in the Russian Empire. His parents were Polish speaking, his father was a Polish convert from Judaism and his mother was Russian Catholic.
Zarnecki attended Jagiellonian University in Kraków, Poland, he attained his MA in 1938 and, from 1936 to 1939, was a junior assistant at the University's Institute of Art History.

== World War II ==
At the outbreak of war with Nazi Germany, Zarnecki, his sister and parents headed for Bucharest. He made his way to France via Italy, joined a Polish regiment and fought in Alsace, France. He was captured in 1940 and escaped twice, recaptured both times he spent two years as a prisoner of War. He narrowly avoided being sent to a concentration camp as a suspected Jew. The fact he was not circumcised, and was wearing a crucifix his mother had given him, saved him from that fate.

Using forged documents Zarnecki escaped to Vichy France and thence into Franco's Spain where he was interned for a year before being allowed to go to England. Zarnecki escaped Spain and made his way to England in 1943. He joined the Free Polish Forces, attaining the rank of Lance Corporal. He spent time compiling an index of the cultural losses that Poland was suffering as a result of the German invasion. Zarnecki was later awarded the French Croix de Guerre and the Polish Cross of Valor (two bars) for his military service.

== Career ==
After the war, Zarnecki stayed on in England and in 1945 attained a position as assistant at the Courtauld Institute of Art's Conway library. He got the job thanks to an earlier association with Anthony Blunt, to whom he had been introduced in 1944. Zarnecki became a naturalised British citizen on 1 July 1949. Whilst at the Courtauld he studied for his PhD, under the supervision of Fritz Saxl director of the Warburg Institute, University of London. He was awarded his PhD in 1950, his thesis had been on the subject of 'Regional Schools in English Sculpture in the 12th century'. In 1949 Zarnecki was promoted to librarian of the Courtauld's Conway library, taking charge of its collection of photographs of sculpture and architecture. He helped organise, and embarked on, expeditions around Europe to build up the library's photographic holdings. In 1959, after serving 10 years as the Conway librarian, Zarnecki was appointed to the Courtauld's academic staff as a Reader. During the academic year 1960 to 61 he held the position of Oxford University's Slade Professor of Fine Art.

In 1961 Zarnecki was made deputy director of the Courtauld Institute serving under the directorship of Anthony Blunt. His role as deputy was largely administrative, he was mainly responsible for the day-to-day running of the Institute. He was appointed a Commander of the Order of the British Empire (CBE) in the 1970 New Year Honours, and was appointed to the Royal Commission on the Historical Monuments of England on 1 January 1972, and was later re-appointed for a further five years on 1 January 1979. He remained deputy director at the Courtauld for 13 years, until 1974, when Blunt retired as director. Zarnecki was widely expected to be appointed director but he did not apply for the position, preferring instead to return to academic teaching and research, and supervising doctoral dissertations including work by Deborah Kahn. It was revealed in 1979 that Blunt had been a spy for the Soviet Union. Despite working with Blunt for almost 30 years Zarnecki described him as elusive, and was horrified by the spying revelation.

Zarnecki officially retired in 1982, though he still continued to do much scholarly work. In 1984 he was the chairman of the committee that organised the Arts Council's major exhibition on English Romanesque art, held at The Hayward art gallery. This exhibition was the first time the subject matter had received such a wide audience. In 1987, Zarnecki and French scholar Jean Bony conceived the idea of creating a publicly available digital archive of British and Irish Romanesque stone sculpture at the British Academy. This was one of the first such projects of its type.

In 2010, Zarnecki was honoured posthumously with a reception at the "Romanesque and the Past, Retrospection in the Art and Architecture of Romanesque Europe" conference held by the British Archaeological Association and The Courtauld.

== Personal life ==
Zarnecki was married to Anne Leslie Frith in 1945. They first met in 1944 during an air raid when they both took shelter together in Regent's Park tube station. She claimed to be impressed by his ostentatious uniform, thinking that he must be a General. The marriage produced a son, the space scientist John Zarnecki, and a daughter.

== Honours and memberships ==
Zarnecki received various honours and awards:

- 1966, member of the Institute for Advanced Study in Princeton, New Jersey
- 1968, Fellow of the British Academy
- Fellow, and former vice-president of the Society of Antiquaries of London
- 1970, Commander of the Order of the British Empire
- 1978, awarded the Gold Badge of the Polish Order of Merit
- 1982, Emeritus professor, University of London
- 1986, Honorary Fellow of the Courtauld Institute.
- 1992, foreign member of the Polish Academy of Learning
- 1994, foreign member of the Polish Academy of Sciences

== Selected bibliography ==
- "Regional Schools of English Sculpture in the Twelfth Century: the Southern School and the Herefordshire School" (PhD thesis, Courtauld Institute of Art, 1950) [the digitised version does not contain plates]
- English Romanesque Sculpture 1066 – 1140 (1951)
- English Romanesque Sculpture 1140 – 1210 (1953)
- English Romanesque Lead Sculpture (1957)
- 1066 and Architectural Sculpture (1966)
- Romanesque Art (1971)
- Art of the Medieval World (1975)
- Cathedrals and Monastic Buildings of the British Isles (1976)
- Studies in Romanesque Sculpture (1979)
- English Romanesque Art 1066 – 1200 (1984)
- Further Studies in Romanesque Sculpture (1992)
