= Elizabeth Parker McLachlan =

American photographer, professor, writer and editor

Elizabeth Parker McLachlan (born 1938) is an American photographer, professor, writer and editor. She specialises in the Bury Bible, and the depiction of liturgical vessels such as censers, and the myrophores (Myrrhbearers) in medieval manuscript art. She is a professor emerita of art history at Rutgers University, New Jersey, USA.

== Biography ==
McLachlan completed her PhD at the Courtauld Institute of Art in 1965. Her thesis, titled The scriptorium of Bury St. Edmunds in the twelfth century, was published by Garland of New York. An important contribution of Parker's thesis was to demonstrate, using codicology and art historical analysis, that the Life of St Edmund was a composite text.

Photographs taken by McLachlan are held at the Courtauld's Conway Library of art and architecture, and are currently being digitised.

McLachlan taught at the Rutgers University Art Department Summer Programme in Paris. She is honorary associate of the Research Group on Manuscript Evidence. McLachlan was a member of the advisory board of the Garland Library of Medieval Literature, serving as art advisor.

She was editor for and contributor to Medieval England: an Encyclopedia (1998).

McLachlan was an early member of the Medieval Feminist Newsletter, now the Society for Medieval Feminist Scholarship.

== Publications ==
- McLachlan, Elizabeth Parker. The Scriptorium of Bury St Edmunds in the Twelfth Century, New York, Garland Publishing (1986). This book is recommended by Alison Ray as part of The Polonsky Foundation England and France Project, a collaborative project by the British Library and Bibliothèque nationale de France.
- McLachlan, Elizabeth Parker. ‘Liturgical vessels and implements’, in Liturgy of the medieval church : Kalamazoo, The Consortium for the Teaching of the Middle Ages, published by the Medieval Institute of the Western Michigan University (2001)
- St. Clair, Archer & McLachlan, Elizabeth Parker. The Carver's Art: Medieval Sculpture in Ivory, Bone, and Horn, Rutgers Univ Zimmerli Art Museum (September 1989)
- McLachlan, Elizabeth Parker, 'In the Wake of the Bury Bible: Followers of Master Hugo at Bury St. Edmunds', in the Journal of the Warburg and Courtauld Institutes, Vol. 42 (1979), pp. 216–224, published by The Warburg Institute, DOI: 10.2307/751094
- McLachlan, Elizabeth Parker, Szarmach, Paul E, Tavormina, Teresa, Rosenthal, Joel, Karkov, Catherine and Lefferts, Peter, edited by, Medieval England: An Encyclopedia.
- McLachlan, Elizabeth Parker, Thurlby, Malcom and Little, Charles T., 'Romanesque Reassembled in England: A Review', Gesta 24, no.1 (1985), pp. 77–86

== Personal life ==
Elizabeth Parker McLachlan was married to the historian of education James McLachlan, who died in 2015.
