= Sarah Symmons =

English art historian

Sarah Symmons-Goubert (pseudonym, Natalya Lowndes) is an English art historian and writer. Born in London, she trained at the Courtauld Institute where she received her doctorate in 1979. She taught art history at Essex University and published several books, including works on Goya, Daumier and the sculptor John Flaxman. Symmons is also known for her fiction, which she published under the pseudonym "Natalya Lowndes". Her debut novel Chekago (1988) was a critical and commercial success; her other novels are Angel in the Sun (1989) and Snow Red (1992). She has published a large number of short stories, essays and articles and is at present the Visual Arts editor of the Hispanic Research Journal, Queen Mary, London University.
