= Francis Robert Kelly =

American artist

Francis Robert Kelly (born in St Paul, Minnesota, USA on 1 May 1927, died on 25 October 2012) was an American artist, printmaker, art restorer and author.

== Early life and education ==
Bob Kelly was born in Minnesota and spent his childhood in Chicago; in his teenage years the family moved to California and he went to high school in Pasadena. His father was a barber and his mother was a waitress.

== Second World War and after ==
Kelly enlisted in the US Navy in 1944, becoming a signalman and serving in the Pacific until 1948. In 1946 he took part in Operation Crossroads, which involved the testing of atomic bombs at Bikini Atoll.

== Personal life ==
He married Gail Rochlen, a teacher, in 1949; they had three sons.

== Higher education ==
On leaving the US Navy in 1948, Kelly studied at the Art Center School in Los Angeles. He went to Paris in 1951 to study for a Diploma in Fine Art at the Académie de la Grande Chaumière (1951-1952). In 1953 he studied at the University of Hawaii, Honolulu, then worked as laboratory assistant to the printmaker John Paul Jones at the University of California, Los Angeles (UCLA). Awarded a Fulbright grant in 1955, he went to London to study in the Graphics Department of the LCC Central School of Arts and Crafts, earning a diploma in Etching. He also studied Painting Conservation at the Courtauld Institute of Art.

== Professional work ==
As an artist, Kelly's works have been exhibited at more than 20 British art galleries, including the Royal Academy, and were regularly shown at the Victor Arwas Gallery (Editions Graphiques) in Mayfair, London. His paintings and prints have been acquired by art galleries across the world, including the Tate Gallery in London, the Ashmolean Museum in Oxford, Glasgow University, Boston Museum of Fine Arts, New York Public Library, Los Angeles County Museum, and the National Gallery of South Australia. Private collectors include Swedish royalty.

Kelly lived in Britain with his family from 1955 onwards, the St George's Gallery, Cork Street, London (founded and run by Robert Erskine in 1955) being the first to exhibit his etchings. He was fascinated by rural England, particularly the area around Budleigh, Devon, where he often travelled to paint and etch. He worked in two main genres, landscapes and female nudes.

In 1966 Kelly was appointed art organiser for the US Embassy’s Festival of American Arts and Humanities, as part of which his paintings appeared in the exhibition Five Americans in Britain. In 1967 he was invited to Florence by the Italian Art and Archives Rescue Fund to help restore paintings in the city’s museums and libraries which had been damaged by flooding from the River Arno. This restoration work eventually resulted in his two publications, listed below.

== Publications ==
=== Books ===
Art Restoration: A Guide to the Care and Preservation of Works of Art, New York: McGraw-Hill, 1972 (also Newton Abbot: David & Charles, 1972).

The Studio and the Artist, Newton Abbot: David & Charles, 1974 (also London: St Martin's Press, 1974; New York: St Martin's Press, 1975).

Restaurierung von Gemälden und Drucken: ein Handbuch für Restauratoren, Händler, Sammler und Liebhaber, Munich: Callwey, 1984.

=== Books containing his work ===
Wyndham Lewis, Exhibition catalogue, London: Zwemmer Gallery, 1957.

Catalogue, Aquatints of Portugal with associated drawings, London: St George’s Gallery Prints, 1960.

Francis Kelly, London: Zwemmer Gallery, 1966.

Francis Kelly and David Koster, Recent Aquatints and Etchings, Mansard Art Gallery, London: Heal & Son, 1968.

Francis Kelly, London: Editions Graphiques Gallery, 1973.

English Landscape Etchings, London: William Weston Gallery, 1974.

Recent Landscape Etchings, London: William Weston Gallery, 1976.

== Sporting interests ==
Kelly's pastimes were swimming, bicycling and running. He competed in 34 triathlons, representing Britain as a veteran in the World Triathlon Championships held in Orlando, Florida in the 1980s. According to his Daily Telegraph obituary, “Kelly lived off London’s Bayswater Road, and came to regard Hyde Park as his garden and the Serpentine as his swimming pool. Having joined the Serpentine Swimming Club (SSC) in 1968, he swam there almost daily for the next 40 years — wearing, whatever the weather, his distinctive Hawaiian shorts.” He won the Daily Telegraph Cup at the SSC in the 1980s, and served as SSC President from 1983 to 1985, being the first American to hold that position.

== Death ==
In later life, Bob Kelly was diagnosed with Parkinson's disease and vascular dementia. He died of pneumonia on 25 October 2012, aged 85.
