= Alice Instone =

English artist

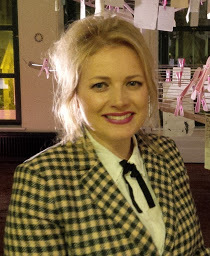
- Instone in 2016
- Education: King's College London, University of London; The Courtauld Institute, University of London; The Institute of Education, University of London
- Website: aliceinstone.com

Alice Instone (born 4 June 1975) is an English artist. She is known for her artwork that is concerned with gender, personal narrative and the similarities that bind humanity together; frequently collaborating with well-known public figures.

== Early life and career ==
Instone was born in 1975 and grew up in East Sussex. She studied English at King's College London and history of art at The Courtauld Institute of Art. She worked as an English teacher and for the advertising agencies WCRS and J. Walter Thompson before becoming an artist in 2005.

== Art ==
Instone's work often uses shared behaviours, emotions, associations and memories – from to-do lists, to shoes, to memories of grandmothers – to hold a mirror to both individual psyches and the collective unconscious. Themes of intimacy and ritual, memory and the passing of time run through her work and she often appropriates historical stories and images.

Her exhibitions are often interactive – thousands of visitors contributed to-do lists to her installation for The Pram in the Hall in 2016, whilst visitors to her magic art caravan in 2018 received readings from ‘The Grandmother’ through her Deck of Archetypes. Participant narratives are an important theme and she uses art as a mechanism for personal revelation.

Instone frequently exhibits in found or non-commercial spaces from the House of Commons, to a former brothel and the banks of the River Thames. She has had solo projects with the United Nations, the British Houses of Parliament, the National Trust, the British Medical Association, No 10 Downing Street, the Royal Society of Arts and global organisations including Ernst and Young, Allen & Overy, Rothschild, Herbert Smith, Chanel and Oxfam.

Instone has collaborated with numerous public figures including musicians Annie Lennox, Beverley Knight, Alison Goldfrapp and Dame Evelyn Glennie, barristers Baroness Kennedy and Cherie Blair, Secretary of State Baroness Scotland, Scientist Professor Baroness Greenfield, actresses Helen McCrory, Sadie Frost and Emilia Fox, model Elle Macpherson, human rights campaigner Bianca Jagger, artists Sir Peter Blake, Chantal Joffe and Fiona Banner, designers Bella Freud, Alice Temperley, Anya Hindmarch and Nicole Farhi, Lord Chief Justice Baron Woolf, talk show host Amanda de Cadanet, photographer Pattie Boyd, Shadow Attorney General Baroness Shami Chakrabarti, playwright Sir David Hare and producer Emma Freud amongst others.

== Exhibitions ==
=== Twenty-one 21st Century Women, 2008 ===
Instone's first solo show depicted 21 contemporary women in response to the vast quantity of powerful-looking male portraits – and the absence of female counterparts – she found in the National Portrait Gallery. The few portraits that did depict women portrayed them as wives, mothers and the occasional monarch. Instone addressed the way we consume images of women (and the narrow range of feminine archetypes on offer) and what she perceived as ‘Lady Macbeth Syndrome’, including the demonisation of powerful women in the popular press. The paintings aimed to change the way women are characterised – representing them as influential and unashamedly powerful. Sitters included Annie Lennox (who wrote an accompanying article on being a feminist), Cherie Blair, Baroness Patricia Scotland, Baroness Helena Kennedy, Professor Baroness Susan Greenfield, Fiona Bruce, Dame Evelyn Glennie, Dame Jacqueline Wilson, Anya Hindmarch and Shami Chakrabarti.

Chris Hastings from The Telegraph wrote;

“They are among the most well-known women in Britain but the chances are that you have never seen them like this before..... Alice Instone's (work) challenges the way women are traditionally portrayed."

The works were exhibited at The House of Commons, The Royal Society of Arts and Ernst & Young’s headquarters.

=== Interview with a Shoe, 2009 ===
Instone's second show was entitled Interview with a Shoe, and featured a collection of portraits of people through their favourite shoes.

The collaboration between the artist and the owners of the shoes revealed the wearer through the pair they chose. Instone found shoes to be emotive and tied up with our values. Many of the shoes came with highly emotional stories or memories (for example the shoes that Annie Lennox wore to the Las Vegas Wedding of Bob Geldof and Paula Yates). Instone also painted the mountains of discarded shoes at the Oxfam Wastesaver Depot and made a number of shoe sculptures exploring the negative messages women receive in daily life, including the constant pressure to consume and the size 0 debate.

The exhibition included the shoes of Annie Lennox, Baron Woolf, Bianca Jagger, Elle Macpherson, Sir Peter Blake Nicole Farhi, Sir David Hare, Cherie Blair, Liz and Terry de Havilland, Laura Bailey, Emma Freud, Pat Cash, Alice Temperley, Joe Corre and Beverley Knight amongst others.

Jennie Murray interviewed her about the exhibition for Radio 4 Woman's Hour in May 2009.

The works were exhibited at Northampton Museum, home to the world's largest shoe collection.

"We all have a favourite pair of shoes and they often reveal something about us without us even realising... Alice has a talent for capturing something quite functional to evoke its charm and make an emotional connection."

- Elle Macpherson

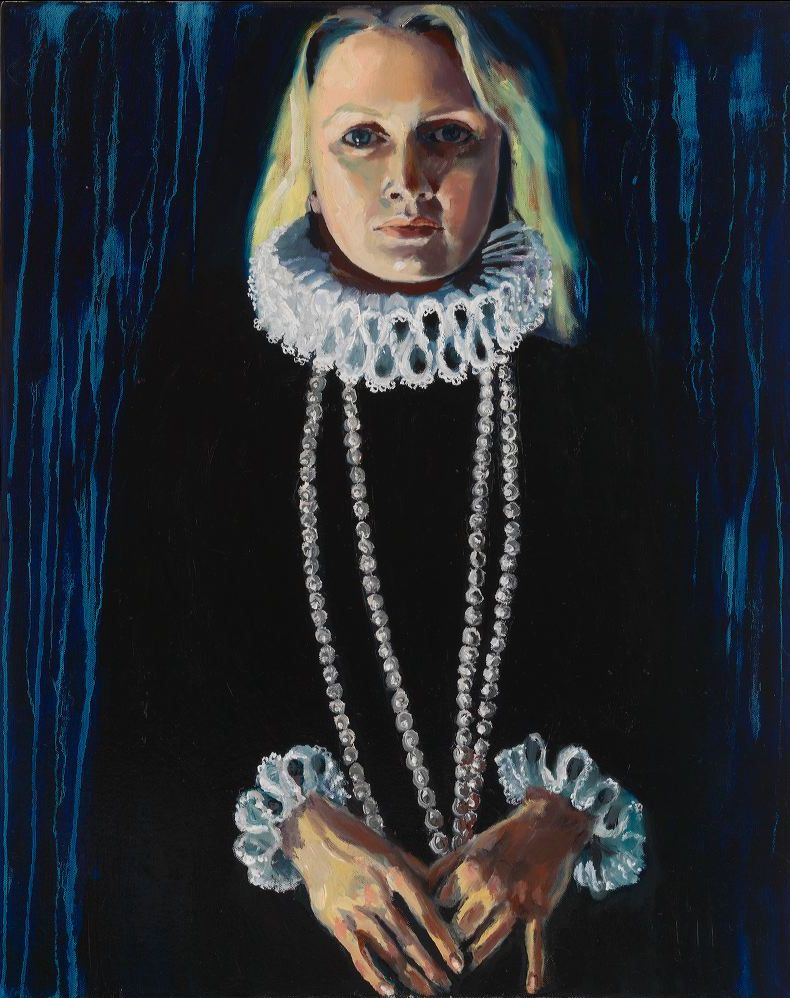
Lorraine as Lucretia Borgia 2010

=== The House of Fallen Women, 2010 ===
In 2010, Instone's series titled The House of the Fallen Woman opened at The House of St Barnabas in Soho, a former refuge for destitute women. Portraying infamous women from history, the work played on the theme of female notoriety by again using several famous or well-known sitters, including Emilia Fox as Marie Antoinette, Annie and Lola Lennox as Elizabeth I and Helen of Troy, Cherie and Kathryn Blair as Eleanor of Acquitaine and Kathryn Swynford, Alice Temperley as Mata Hari, Emma Freud as Emma Hamilton and Caitlin Moran as Kitty Fisher.

The exhibition also included a series of prints of the different words for ‘a female of loose morals’ entitled Slag Spiral, which were also exhibited in a former brothel in Archer Street, Soho.

India Knight wrote in The Evening Standard:

"The women in these paintings paid the highest prices for their “transgressions”. We don't have to, and the very least we can do is raise a glass to them in all their bad, wild, brave, magnificent glory."

=== Because a Fire Was In My Head, 2012 ===
Instone’s 2012 solo show explored the role of the female muse in history and art history. The title of the show is a line from a W B Yeats poem. Instone stated that the sexually charged paintings aimed to express the conviction that painting and making marks on a surface can achieve a sense of reality like no other medium.

The depiction of a breastfeeding woman in the painting ‘Pax’ prompted Baroness Helena Kennedy QC to write:

"I love this painting. Any woman who has breastfed knows the experience of shooting milk darts with abandon. It makes me laugh that people are so squeamish about lactating breasts. We are happy to have women’s nakedness draped over cars and festooning page 3 but the very function for which breasts primarily exist so often evokes grunts of disapproval or prim censure. Alice has captured the sensuousness of the whole business. It's beautiful."

Caitlin Moran wrote in The Times:

"Although all the [paintings] are stunning, my favourite reminds me of the story of the tram crash that injured the Mexican artist Frida Kahlo. Impaled on a massive shard of metal, Kahlo came round to discover that someone on the tram had been carrying a tin of gold paint, and she was now covered in it. Gilded like a living human idol. A painful, disturbing and new image of womanhood."

The work was exhibited The Cob Gallery in London.

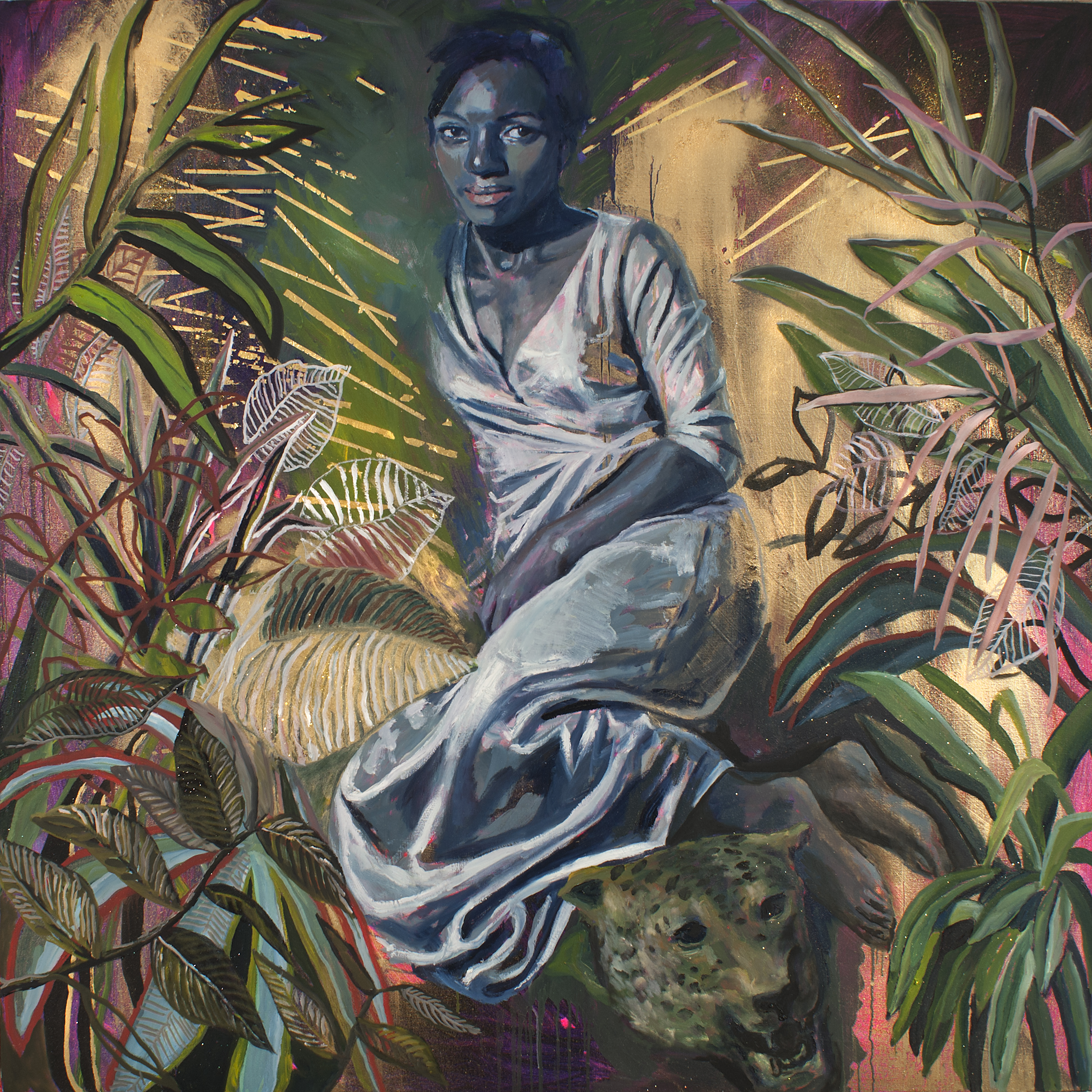
Tell me everything you saw and what you think it means 2017

=== She Should Have Known Better, 2013 ===
In her 2012 exhibition at the former home of writer Henry James (now owned by the National Trust) Instone drew from James’ heroines and his themes of freedom, transgression and female virtue, to showcase women who broke the rules. The subjects also included contemporary women; moving from James’ Daisy Miller to pop star Hyon Song-wol, former girlfriend of North Korean leader Kim Jong-un, reportedly executed by firing squad.

Portraits included Helen McCrory as Lilith (Adam's wife before Eve), and a roster of women given a terrible press during their lifetimes paralleled the way women who dare to put their heads above the media parapet are punished in the press today – their appearance mocked, their morals scrutinised and their ambition imbued with sinister qualities.

The Observer wrote:

"She is a sympathetic mixture of distrait glamour and robust feminism... Instone is more than a portraitist. She is a casting director."

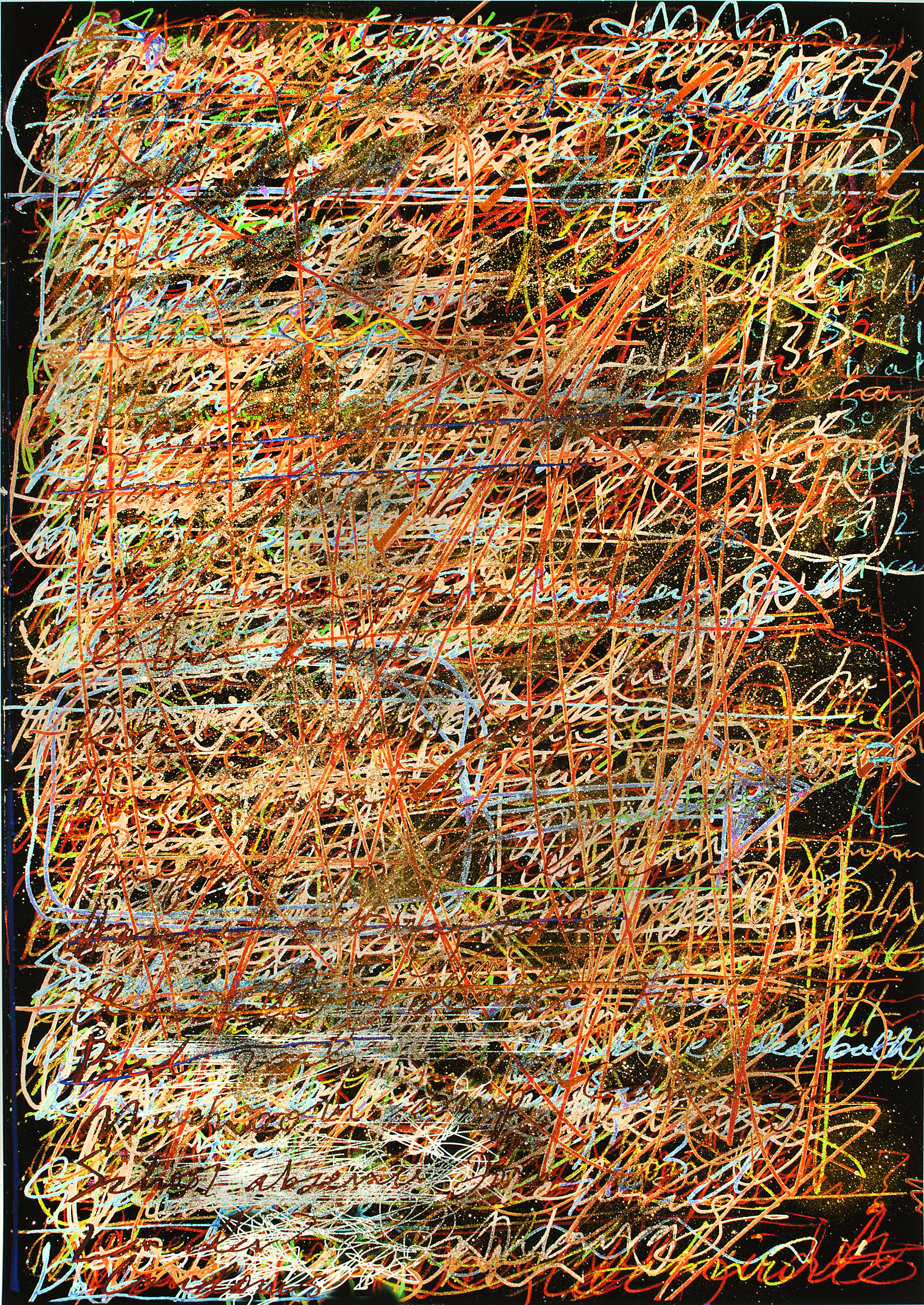
The yellow wallpaper 2016

=== The Pram in the Hall, 2016 ===
Overwhelmed by her to-do lists after having children, Instone collected the lists of well-known women and laid them out for the public to examine. She also made large, glittering, layered prints of her personal lists – reflecting her state of mind. She then invited the public to bring their own lists and add them to a large-scale installation.

Nancy Durrant, Arts Editor of The Times wrote:

"It's such good snooping.... an exhibition by the artist Alice Instone offers a peek into the day-to-day lives of Cherie Blair, Emma Freud and Shami Chakrabarti in their own words... Yet she also thinks of them as tiny, candid portraits, a sort of opposite to the Instagram edit of someone’s life, with all the tedious, incidental details intact... Instone’s interest in the imbalance of domestic work... is a continuation of the artists’s long-held fascination with women and power."

Instone was subsequently featured in Jenny Eclair’s Radio 4 programme A List Free Day.

The exhibition opened at 1 Cathedral Street, London in conjunction with International Women’s Day 2016.

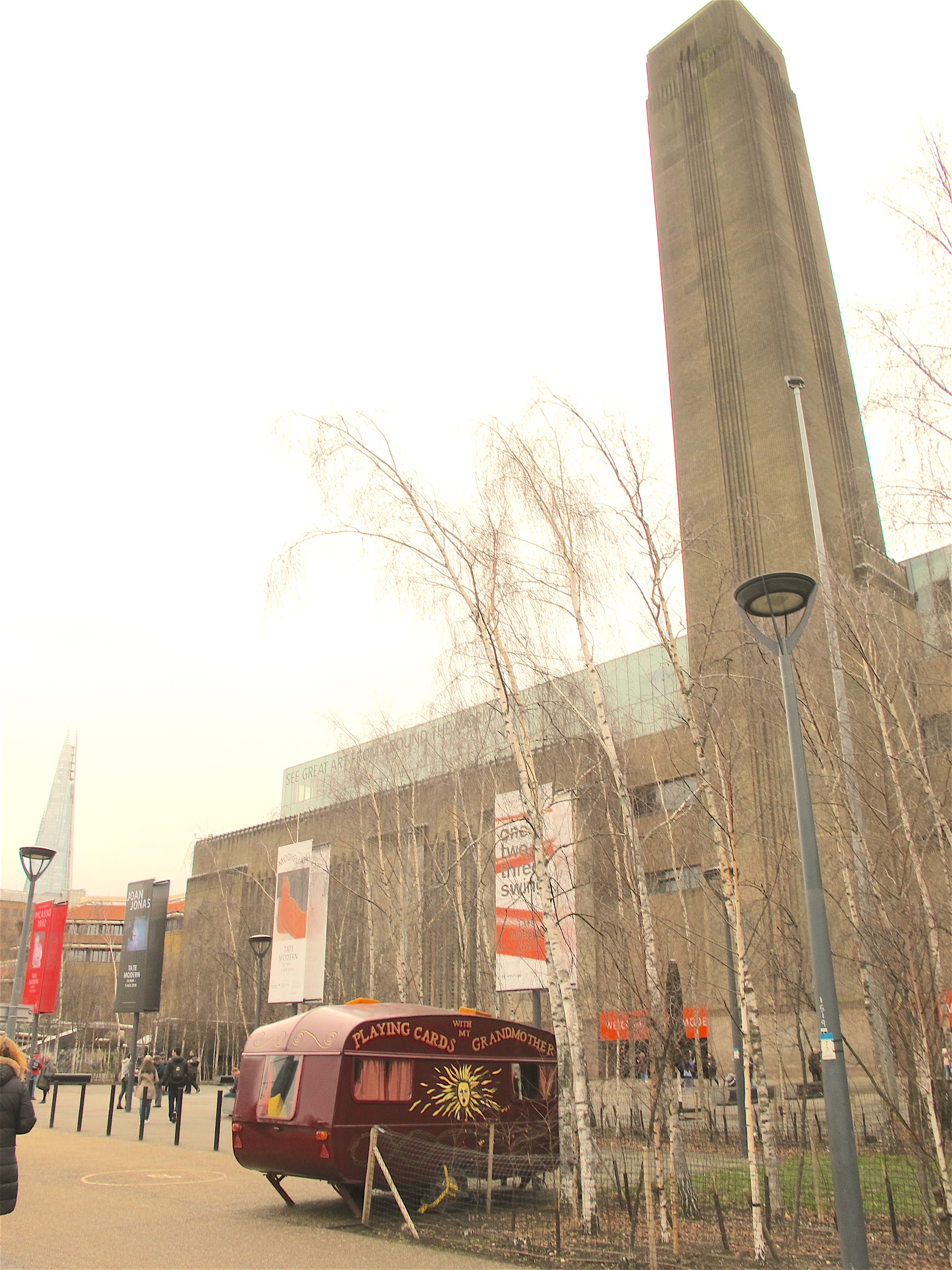
Playing cards with my grandmother, Tate Modern 2018

=== Playing Cards with My Grandmother, 2018 ===
In Spring 2018, Instone represented visual arts for UN Women and created a magic art caravan that travelled round London as part of her initiative to make art more democratic. The project explored the notion that ‘what we share is more powerful than what divides us’.

Taking the card games she played as a child with her grandmother as her starting point, Instone created a card deck of archetypes for the project, drawn from stories around the globe, which offered grandmotherly advice. Visitors were welcomed into a jewel-like, enchanted world to play a game of cards or experience the intimacy, ritual and catharsis of a card reading. Visitors were then invited to record the name and any memories about their grandmother in The Book of Grandmothers.

The caravan was stationed outside Canary Wharf Tube in Reuters Plaza, at the top of Carnaby Street and in front of Tate Modern Bankside, overlooking the River Thames.

== Instone in Hollywood ==
In 2015 Instone began as artist in residence at the Hollywood hotel, the Chateau Marmont. Tell Me Everything You Saw And What You Think It Means and the accompanying book, published by Pallas Athene are expected in February 2019.

== Solo exhibitions ==
- 2018: Playing Cards with My Grandmother, Reuters Plaza Canary Wharf, River Walkway Tate Modern Bankside, Carnaby Street Soho (all in London)
- 2016: The Pram in the Hall, 1 Cathedral Street, Southwark, London
- 2013: She Should Have Known Better, Lamb House, Rye: National Trust owned home of Henry James
- 2012: Because A Fire Was In My Head, Cob Gallery, 205 Royal College Street, London
- 2010: The House of Fallen Women, The House of St Barnabas in Soho, London: Grade I listed former refuge for destitute women
- 2010: Alice Instone, Northampton Museum: home to the largest collection of historical footwear in the world
- 2010: Phantom of Delight, Archer Street Soho London: former brothel – collaboration with photographer Camilla Broadbent
- 2009: Interview With A Shoe, BBB Gallery London
- 2009: Laura Bailey's Lucky Shoes, Chanel Head Office London
- 2008: In History Anonymous Was A Woman, Houses of Parliament, London: opened by Theresa May MP
- 2008: 21 21st Century Women, 1 More London Place, London: Ernst & Young Headquarters: opened by Baroness Kennedy of the Shaws
- 2007: Phenomenal Women, Royal Society of Arts, London

== Personal life ==
Instone married Hugh Billett at Chelsea Register Office in 2002, and has a daughter (born 2008) and a son (born 2011). Her brother is businessman Sam Instone.

== Publications ==
- The Grandmother’s Tarot, published March 2018 by Pallas Athene
- The Pram In the Hall, published May 2018 by Pallas Athene
- Tell Me Everything You Saw And What You Think It Means, 2019 by Pallas Athene
