= Peter Cannon-Brookes =

British art historian (1938–2026)

Peter Cannon-Brookes (23 August 1938 – 3 May 2026) was a British art historian, with a special interest in Czech sculpture, and a curator who founded the journal Museum Management and Curatorship.

== Early life and education ==
Cannon-Brookes was born on 23 August 1938, the son of Victor Montgomery Cannon Brookes and Nancy Margaret Markham-Carter. His father, a solicitor, and outwardly “a genial, safe, reliable family man”, was an intelligence officer and secretary of the Special Operations Executive, who, after World War II, went on to help in the fight against the Cold War.

He attended Bryanston School and studied Natural Sciences at Trinity Hall, Cambridge (MA) and History of Art at the Courtauld Institute of Art (PhD).

== Career ==
Cannon-Brookes served as Keeper of Art at Birmingham Museum and Art Gallery from 1965 to 1978 and then at the National Museum of Wales in Cardiff between 1978 and 1986. He produced a number of exhibitions and accompanying catalogues during his time as museum curator. He was consultant curator for the Franta Belsky and Irena Sedlecká Studios, but his main focus has been education and research, particularly of the conservation and security of art objects.

He was a member of the International Committee for Conservation, part of the International Council of Museums, for many years, acting as president of the International Art Exhibitions Committee and vice chairman of the board of the ICOM-CC (1978–81). Also a Fellow of the International Institute for Conservation of Historic and Artistic Works, he has lectured and written on the subject and, in 1982, he founded the journal Museum Management and Curatorship. In an article for the journal to commemorate its 30th anniversary in 2012, Cannon-Brookes reflected on how little the problems facing museums had changed and mourned the teaching of what he called ‘historic art’. Whilst talking about resources and funding he makes reference to the photographs held by the Witt and Conway Libraries housed at the Courtauld Institute of Art to which he contributed. The archive of primarily architectural images held by the Conway Library is being digitised to widen the reach of this research resource.

Cannon-Brookes continued to be involved with the history of art, lecturing on Czech sculpture, for example, a talk on Czechoslovak figurative sculpture to accompany the 2019 exhibition, Czech Routes at the Ben Uri Gallery, and reviewing exhibitions. In March 2020, he and his wife co-wrote a review of the exhibition George IV: Art & Spectacle at the Queen's Gallery for the British Society for Eighteenth-Century Studies and they both contributed articles to the exhibition catalogue Czech Routes to Britain. Additionally, Cannon-Brookes contributed to the Encyclopædia Britannica.

He received an Honorary Silver Medal of Jan Masaryk from the Czech Republic Ambassador at the Czech Embassy in London in July 2021.

== Personal life and death ==
Cannon-Brookes married a fellow student of the Courtauld Institute of Art, Caroline Aylmer Christie-Miller. She taught at both Leeds University and the Oxford University Department for Continuing Education and, together with her husband, she co-authored a book on Baroque churches. The couple had two children, Stephen William Aylmer Cannon-Brookes, an associate professor at the Bartlett School of Environment, Energy & Resources at University College London, and Emma Wilbraham Montgomery Cannon-Brookes.

Cannon-Brookes died on 3 May 2026, aged 87.

== Selected publications ==
- Baroque Churches, with Caroline Cannon-Brookes, Littlehampton Book Services Ltd, 1969 ISBN 0600016439
- Lombard Paintings c1595-c1630 : The age of Frederico Borromeo, Birmingham : City Museums and Art Gallery, 1974
- After Gulbenkian : a study paper towards the training of conservators and curators of works of art, foreword by Sir Norman Reid, Birmingham : Birmingham Art Gallery and Museum, 1976
- The Cornbury Park Bellini : a contribution towards the study of the late paintings of Giovanni Bellini, Birmingham : Birmingham Art Gallery and Museum, 1977 ISBN 0709300034
- Michael Ayrton : an illustrated commentary, Birmingham : Birmingham Museums and Art Gallery, 1978 ISBN 0903504146
- Claude Monet 1840-1926 : an exhibition of paintings from the National Museum of Wales, Cardiff and the Musée Marmottan, Paris, Cardiff : National Museum of Wales, 1980 ISBN 0720002311
- Emile Antoine Bourdelle : an illustrated commentary, Cardiff : Trefoil Books : National Museum of Wales, 1983 ISBN 0862940397
- Czech Sculpture 1800-1838, Jiří Kotalík, ed. Peter Cannon-Brookes, Cardiff : Trefoil Books and the National Museum of Wales, 1983 ISBN 0862940435
- Ota Janeček, Jiří Kotalík, Luboš Hlaváček and Zdeněk Vaníček, ed. Peter Cannon-Brookes, Cardiff : Trefoil Books and the National Museum of Wales, 1984
- The Painted Word : British history painting, 1750-1830, Woodbridge : The Boydell Press, 1991 ISBN 0851152902
- William Redgrave, 1903-1986 : commentary and catalogue, London : Unicorn, 1998 ISBN 0906290228
