= John Onians =

British art historian (born 1942)

John B Onians, FSA (born 1942) is Professor Emeritus of World Art at the University of East Anglia, Norwich and specialised in architecture, especially the architectural theory of the Italian Renaissance; painting, sculpture and architecture in Ancient Greece and Rome; Byzantine art, material culture, metaphor and thought; perception and cognition, and the biological basis of art. His recent work has been instrumental in the establishment of Neuroarthistory as a distinct set of methodologies.

== Early life and education ==
Onians is the son of the distinguished classicist, Richard Broxton Onians and Rosalind Lathbury. He is a graduate of the University of Cambridge, and of the Courtauld Institute of Art and Warburg Institutes, University of London. His PhD on Italian architectural theory and practice was supervised by Ernst Gombrich. He also received a postgraduate diploma in the History of European Art from London University.

== Career ==
Onians was Founder Editor of the journal Art History in 1978. He was professor of Visual Arts and Director of the World Art Research Programme at the University of East Anglia from 1971 until his retirement in 2007 where he was instrumental in the development of the Art History department, and the creation of the School of World Art Studies and Museology.

In 1997–1999, he established the division of Research and Academic Programs at the Clark Art Institute, Williamstown Mass. He has been a fellow of the Centre for Advanced Study in the History of Art at the National Gallery of Art, Washington, D.C. and at the Wissenschaftskolleg, Berlin, the William Evans Fellow at the University of Otago, New Zealand, and a Scholar at the Getty Research Institute.

He has authored a number of books, Art and the Thought in the Hellenistic Age, Bearers of Meaning, for which he was awarded the Sir Bannister Fletcher Prize, Classical Art and the Cultures of Greece and Rome, Art, culture and nature: from art history to world art studies, Neuroarthistory: From Aristotle and Pliny to Baxandall and Zeki and, most recently, European Art: A Neuroarthistory. He has edited Sight and Insight, Atlas of World Art, Compression vs. Expression, and The Art Atlas.

Onians has been discussed in books such as Art History and its Methods (1995) and Raising the Eyebrow (2002). His photographic work also features in the Conway Library, whose archive of primarily architectural images is being digitised under the wider Courtauld Connects project.
