= Archdeacon of Bombay =

The Archdeacon of Bombay was a senior ecclesiastical officer within the Anglican Diocese of Bombay, and dates back to the early 19th Century. As such he was responsible for the disciplinary supervision of the clergy within his part of the diocese. It is now the Church of North India Diocese of Bombay.

In 1866, C. H. Leigh Lye had held this post since 1865, and was bishop's commissary.
