= Erin Griffey =

New Zealand art historian

Academic background
- Education: Courtauld Institute of Art
- Thesis: "The Artist's Roles: Searching for self-portraiture in the seventeenth-century Netherlands" (2001)

Academic work
- Discipline: Art history
- Institutions: University of Auckland

Erin Griffey is an academic historian and Professor of Art History at the University of Auckland. She works on the culture of the Stuart court in England and 17th-century material culture.

== Career ==
She gained a PhD in Art History at the Courtauld Institute of Art, University of London, in 2001 with a thesis titled "The Artist's Roles: Searching for self-portraiture in the seventeenth-century Netherlands". Griffey has taught at the University of Auckland since 2002. She was elected as a fellow of the Fellow of the Society of Antiquaries, London, in 2019.

Griffey and chemist Michél Nieuwoudt have researched the history of cosmetics, recreating renaissance medical recipes as the "Beautiful Chemistry Project".

== Selected publications ==
- Facing Decay: Beauty, Aging, and Cosmetics in Early Modern Europe (Penn, 2025).
- (with Michél Nieuwoudt), "Beautiful Experiments: Reading and Reconstructing Early Modern European Cosmetic Recipes", Sarah A. Bendall and Serena Dyer, Embodied Experiences of Making in Early Modern Europe: Bodies, Gender, and Material Culture (Amsterdam University Press, 2025), pp. 135–162.
- "Blooming fertility: Henrietta Maria and the power of Plants", Susannah Lyon-Whaley, Floral Culture and the Tudor and Stuart courts (Routledge, 2025), pp. 153–176.
- "Re-Dressing the Evidence: Henrietta Maria's Wardrobe Accounts, 1627–1639", Costume, 57:1 (March 2023), pp. 3–30 doi:10.3366/cost.2023.0243
- "Home Comforts: Stuart Queens Consort and Negotiating Foreigness at Court", Christina Strunck & Lukas Maier, Rank Matters: New Research on Female Rulers in the Early Modern Era from an Intersectional Perspective (FAU, 2022). doi:10.25593/978-3-96147-592-6
- "The Rose and Lily Queen: Henrietta Maria's Fair Face and the Power of Beauty at the Stuart Court", Renaissance Studies, 35:5 (November 2021), pp. 811–836. doi:10.1111/rest.12724
- "Restoring Henrietta Maria's English Household in the 1660s: Continuity, Kinship and Clientage", The Court Historian (2021). doi:10.1080/14629712.2021.1971379
- Erin Griffey, ed., Sartorial Politics in Early Modern Europe: Fashioning Women (Amsterdam University Press, 2019).
- On Display: Henrietta Maria and the Materials of Magnificence at the Stuart Court (Yale, 2016).
- "More on the 'Dutch Gift' to Charles II", The Burlington Magazine, 153:1301 (2011), pp. 521–522.
- Erin Griffey, ed., Henrietta Maria: Piety, Politics and Patronage (Ashgate, 2008).
- "Multum in Parvo: Portraits of Jeffrey Hudson, Court Dwarf to Henrietta Maria", British Art Journal (Autumn 2003), pp. 39–53.
- Erin Griffey, ed., Envisioning Self and Status: Self-Representation in the Low Countries (London: UCL, 1999).
- "The artist's stage: The schilderkamer as a site of play in the 17th century", De zeventiende eeuw , 15 (1999), pp. 48-60
