= Oxford History of Art =

Monographic series

Archaic and Classical Greek Art (1998), by Robin Osborne in the Oxford History of Art.

The Oxford History of Art is a monographic series about the history of art, design and architecture published by Oxford University Press. It combines volumes covering specific periods with thematic volumes. The history is divided into histories of Western Art, Western Architecture, World Art, Western Design, Photography, Western Sculpture, Themes and Genres, and a critical anthology of art writing. The entire work consists of over 30 volumes.

== Series ==
Title	Author(s)	Date of publication
The Photograph	Graham Clarke	1997
Art in Europe 1700–1830: A History of the Visual Arts in an Era of Unprecedented Urban Economic Growth	Matthew Craske	1997
Art and Society in Italy, 1350–1500; Reissued as: Art in Renaissance Italy, 1350–1500 (2000)	Evelyn Welch	1997
Twentieth Century Design	Jonathan M. Woodham	1997
African-American Art	Sharon F. Patton	1998
Architecture in the United States	Dell Upton	1998
Sculpture Since 1945	Andrew Causey	1998
Native North American Art	Janet Catherine Berlo and Ruth B. Phillips	1998
Archaic and Classical Greek Art	Robin Osborne	1998
Imperial Rome and Christian Triumph: The Art of the Roman Empire AD 100–450; 2nd ed: The Art of the Roman Empire AD 100–450 (2018)	Jaś Elsner	1998
The Art of Art History: A Critical Anthology "New edition" (2009)	Donald Preziosi	1998
Modern Art 1851–1929: Capitalism and Representation	Richard Brettell	1999
Landscape and Western Art	Malcolm Andrews	1999
Early Medieval Architecture	Roger Stalley	1999
Aegean Art and Architecture	Donald Preziosi and Louise Hitchcock	1999
Byzantine Art; 2nd ed (2018)	Robin Cormack	2000
After Modern Art 1945–2000; 2nd ed: After Modern Art 1945–2017 (2018)	David Hopkins	2000
European Architecture 1750–1890	Barry Bergdoll	2000
Classical Art: From Greece to Rome	Mary Beard and John Henderson	2001
Indian Art	Partha Mitter	2001
Medieval Art	Veronica Sekules	2001
Modern Architecture	Alan Colquhoun	2002
Twentieth-Century American Art	Erika Doss	2002
Early Art and Architecture of Africa	Peter Garlake	2002
Medieval Architecture	Nicola Coldstream	2002
Early Medieval Art	Lawrence Nees	2002
Fashion	Christopher Breward	2003
Portraiture	Shearer West	2004
Beauty and Art: 1750–2000	Elizabeth Prettejohn	2005
Design in the USA	Jeffrey L. Meikle	2005
The Pacific Arts of Polynesia and Micronesia	Adrienne L. Kaeppler	2008
Northern Renaissance Art	Susie Nash	2008
Art in China; 2nd ed (2009)	Craig Clunas	2009
Renaissance Architecture	Christy Anderson	2013
Roman Architecture	Janet DeLaine	2024
Victorian Architecture	G.A. Bremner	2026
The Art of the Victorians	Elizabeth Prettejohn	2027

== Similar Series ==
- Pelican History of Art
- Thames & Hudson's World of Art
