= Preziosi =

Preziosi may refer to:

- Giochi Preziosi, Italian toy company

== People with the surname ==
- Alessandro Preziosi (born 1973), Italian actor
- Amedeo Preziosi (1816–1882), Maltese artist
- Carmine Preziosi (born 1943), Italian road cyclist
- Donald Preziosi (born 1941), American art historian
- Enrico Preziosi (born 1948), Italian entrepreneur
- Giovanni Preziosi (1881–1945), Italian Fascist politician
