= Harvard Art Museums =

Art museums in Massachusetts, U.S.

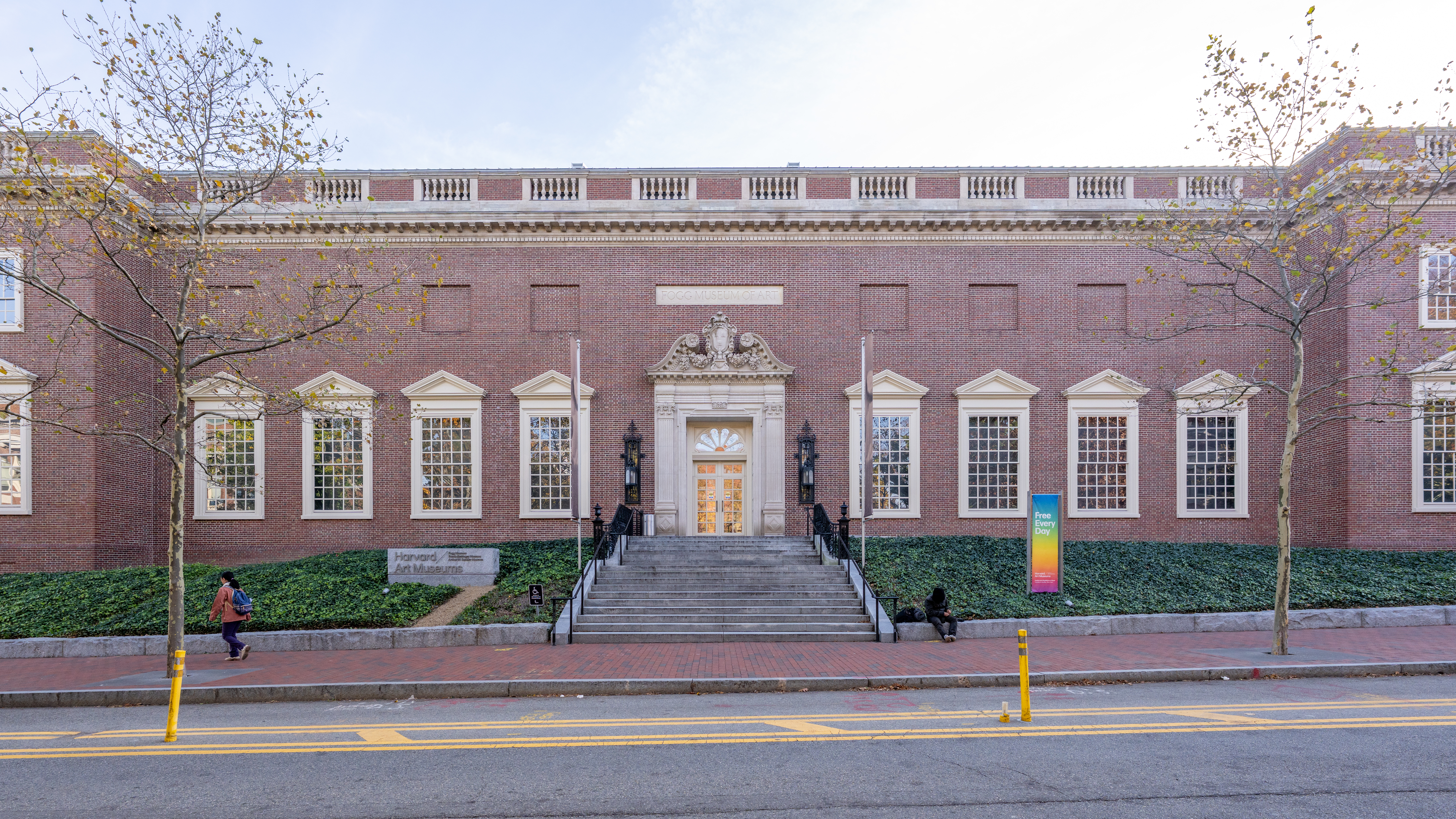
- The original Fogg Art Museum is one of the main entryways to the Harvard Art Museums
- Interactive fullscreen map
- Established: 1983 (by merger of 3 earlier museums)
- Location: 32 Quincy Street; Cambridge, Massachusetts, U.S.
- Coordinates: 42°22′27″N 71°06′53″W
- Type: Art museum
- Collection size: ~250,000
- Director: Sarah Ganz Blythe
- Curator: Soyoung Lee
- Architect: Renzo Piano
- Owner: Harvard University
- Public transit access: Harvard (MBTA Red Line)
- Website: harvardartmuseums.org

The Harvard Art Museums are part of Harvard University and comprise three museums: the Fogg Museum (established in 1895), the Busch-Reisinger Museum (established in 1903), and the Arthur M. Sackler Museum (established in 1985), and four research centers: the Archaeological Exploration of Sardis (founded in 1958), the Center for the Technical Study of Modern Art (founded in 2002), the Harvard Art Museums Archives, and the Straus Center for Conservation and Technical Studies (founded in 1928). The three museums that constitute the Harvard Art Museums were initially integrated into a single institution under the name Harvard University Art Museums in 1983. The word "University" was dropped from the institutional name in 2008.

The collections include approximately 250,000 objects in all media, ranging in date from antiquity to the present and originating in Europe, North America, North Africa, the Middle East, South Asia, East Asia, and Southeast Asia. The main building contains 204,000 square feet (19,000 m^{2}) of space for public exhibitions, classrooms, conservation and research labs, and other related functions. Approximately 43,000 square feet (4,000 m^{2}) of space are dedicated to exhibitions.

== Renovation and expansions ==
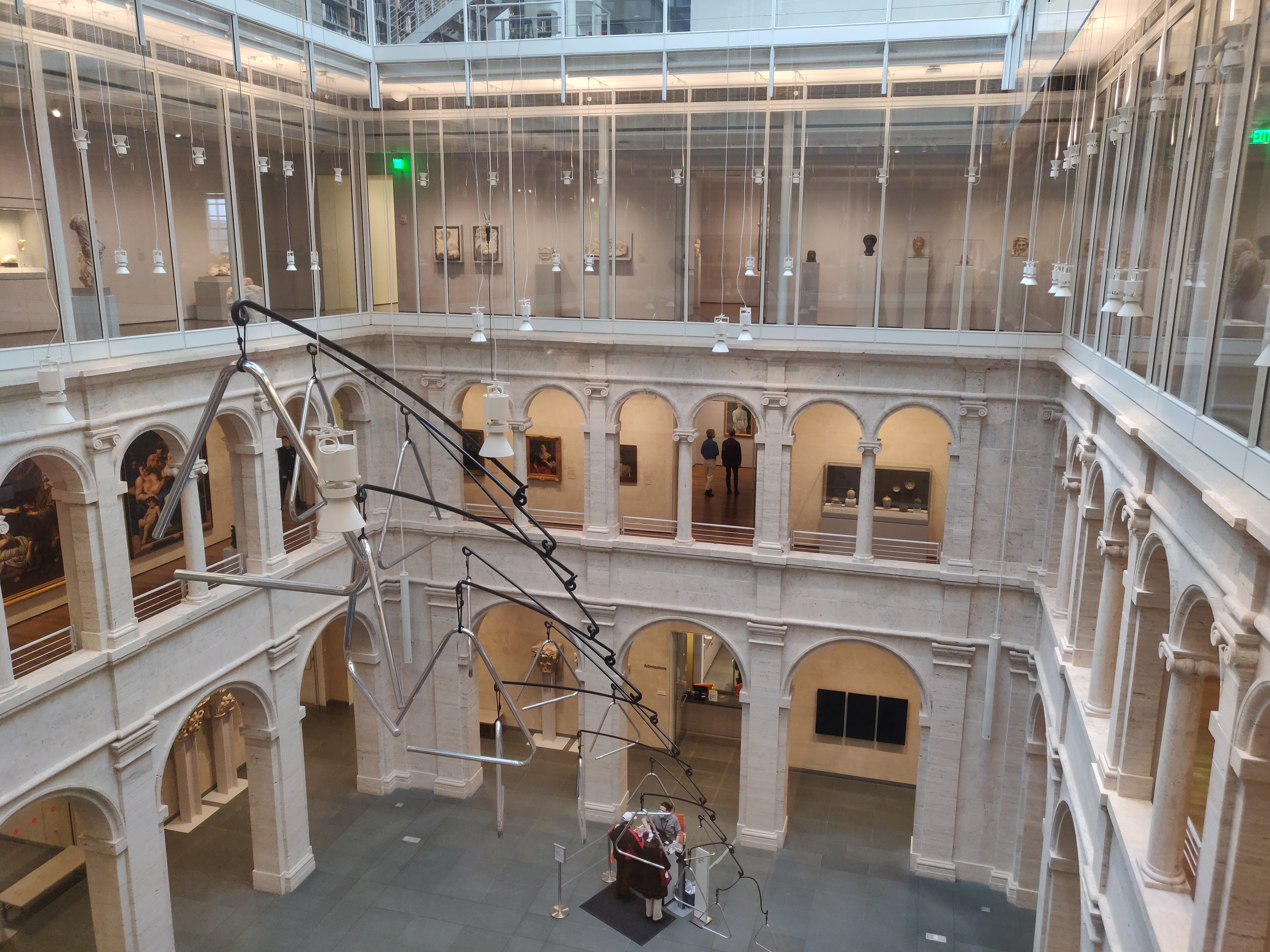
Atrium at 32 Quincy Street (view as a 360° interactive panorama)

In 2008, the Harvard Art Museums' historic building at 32 Quincy Street, Cambridge, was closed for a major renovation and expansion project. During the beginning phases of this project, the Arthur M. Sackler Museum at 485 Broadway, Cambridge, displayed selected works from the collections of the Fogg, Busch-Reisinger, and Sackler museums from September 13, 2008, through June 1, 2013.

The renovated building at 32 Quincy Street united the three museums in a single facility designed by architect Renzo Piano, which increased gallery space by 40% and added a glass, truncated pyramidal roof. In a street-level view of the front facade, the glass roof and other expansions are mostly hidden, largely preserving the original appearance of the building. The renovation was supervised by LeMessurier Consultants and Silman Associates.

The renovation added six levels of galleries, classrooms, lecture halls, and new study areas providing access to parts of the 250,000-piece collection of the museums. The new building was opened in November 2014.

== Directors ==
- Charles Herbert Moore: 1896–1909
- Edward W. Forbes: 1909–1944
- John Coolidge: 1948–1968
- Agnes Mongan: 1968–1971
- Daniel Robbins: 1972–1974
- Seymour Slive: 1975–1984
- Edgar Peters Bowron: 1985–1990
- James Cuno: 1991–2002
- Thomas W. Lentz: 2003–2015
- Martha Tedeschi: 2016–2024
- Sarah Ganz Blythe: 2024–present

== Fogg Museum ==
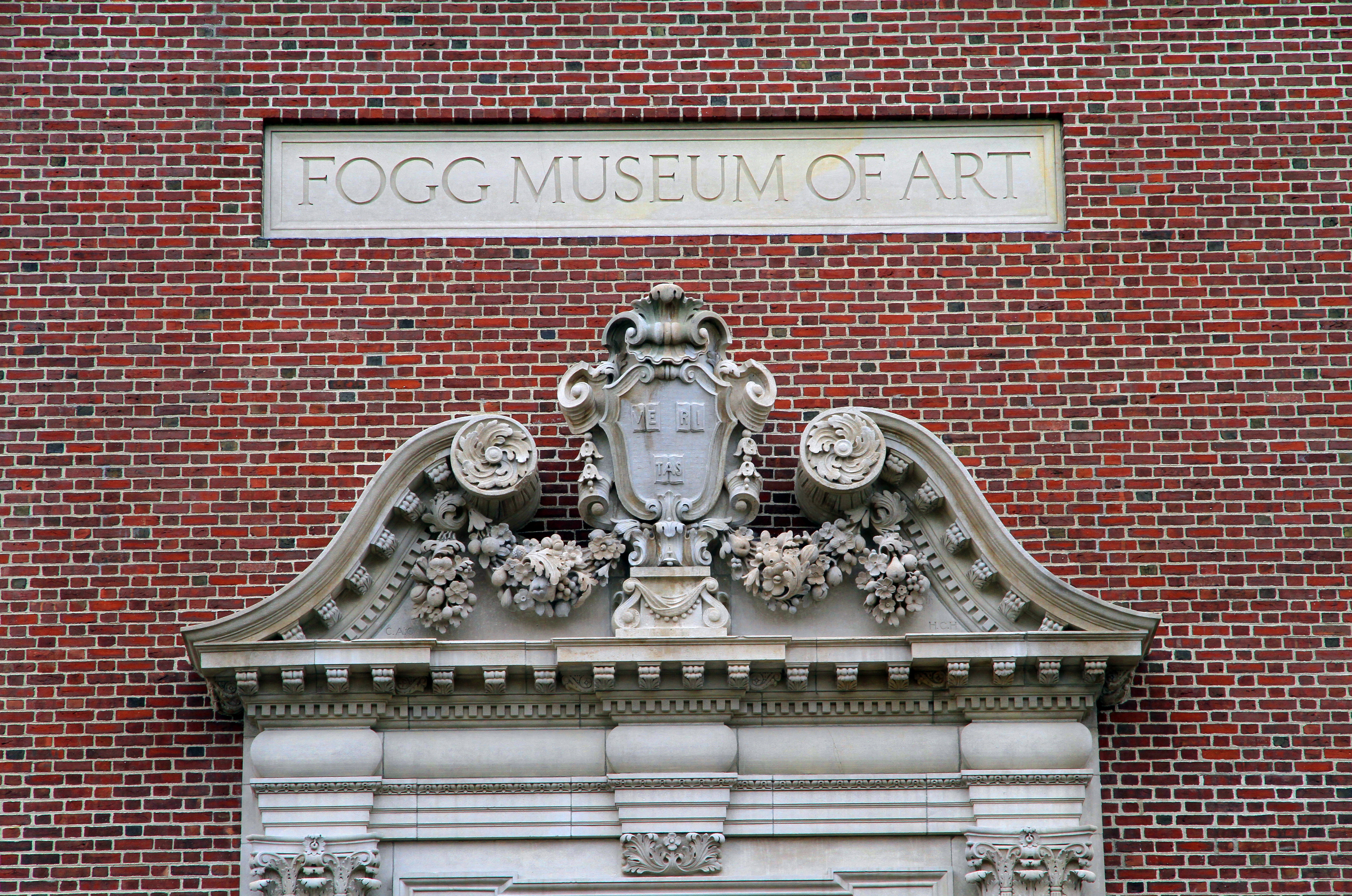
The original entryway pediment of the Fogg Museum of Art now overlooks a main entrance to the Harvard Art Museums

The Fogg Museum, opened to the public in 1896, is the oldest and largest component of the Harvard Art Museums.

=== History ===
The museum was originally housed in an Italian Renaissance-style building designed by Richard Morris Hunt. According to Donald Preziosi, the museum was not initially established as a gallery for the display of original works of art, but was founded as an institution for the teaching and study of visual arts, and the original building contained classrooms equipped with magic lanterns, a library, an archive of slides and photographs of art works, and exhibition space for reproductions of works of art. In 1925, the building was replaced by a Georgian Revival-style structure on Quincy Street, designed by Coolidge, Shepley, Bulfinch, and Abbott. (The original Hunt Hall remained, underutilized until it was demolished in 1974 to make way for new freshman dormitories.)

=== Collection ===
The Fogg Museum is renowned for its holdings of Western paintings, sculpture, decorative arts, photographs, prints, and drawings from the Middle Ages to the present. Particular strengths include Italian Renaissance, British Pre-Raphaelite, and French art of the 19th century, as well as 19th- and 20th-century American paintings and drawings.

The museum's Maurice Wertheim Collection is a notable group of Impressionist and Post-Impressionist works that contains many famous masterpieces, including paintings and sculptures by Paul Cézanne, Edgar Degas, Édouard Manet, Henri Matisse, Pablo Picasso, and Vincent van Gogh. Central to the Fogg's holdings is the Grenville L. Winthrop Collection, with more than 4,000 works of art. Bequeathed to Harvard in 1943, the collection continues to play a pivotal role in shaping the legacy of the Harvard Art Museums, serving as a foundation for teaching, research, and professional training programs. It includes important 19th-century paintings, sculpture, and drawings by William Blake, Edward Burne-Jones, Jacques-Louis David, Honoré Daumier, Winslow Homer, Jean Auguste Dominique Ingres, Alfred Barye, Pierre-Auguste Renoir, Auguste Rodin, John Singer Sargent, Henri de Toulouse-Lautrec, and James Abbott McNeill Whistler.

The art museum has Late Medieval Italian paintings by the Master of Offida, Master of Camerino, Bernardo Daddi, Simone Martini, Luca di Tomme, Pietro Lorenzetti, Ambrogio Lorenzetti, Master of Orcanesque Misercordia, Master of Saints Cosmas and Damiançand Bartolomeo Bulgarini.

Flemish Renaissance paintings — Master of Catholic Kings, Jan Provoost, Master of Holy Blood, Aelbert Bouts, and Master of Saint Ursula.

Italian Renaissance period paintings — Fra Angelico, Sandro Botticelli, Domenico Ghirlandaio, Gherardo Starnina, Cosme Tura, Giovanni di Paolo, and Lorenzo Lotto.

French Baroque period paintings — Nicolas Poussin, Jacques Stella, Nicolas Regnier, and Philippe de Champaigne.

Dutch Master paintings — Rembrandt, Emanuel de Witte, Jan Steen, Willem Van de Velde, Jacob van Ruisdael, Salomon van Ruysdael, Jan van der Heyden, and Dirck Hals.

American paintings — Gilbert Stuart, Charles Willson Peale, Robert Feke, Sanford Gifford, James McNeill Whistler, John Singer Sargent, Thomas Eakins, Man Ray, Ben Shahn, Jacob Lawrence, Lewis Rubenstein, Robert Smullyan Sloan, Phillip Guston, Jackson Pollock, Kerry James Marshall, and Clyfford Still.

In the fall of 2021, the Harvard Art Museums launched the "ReFrame" initiative, with the goal of promoting greater representation and presenting more perspectives within their exhibits. The initiative aims to bring unseen artwork out of storage and re-contextualize existing exhibits, to tell the stories of marginalized individuals in each curation.

== Gallery ==
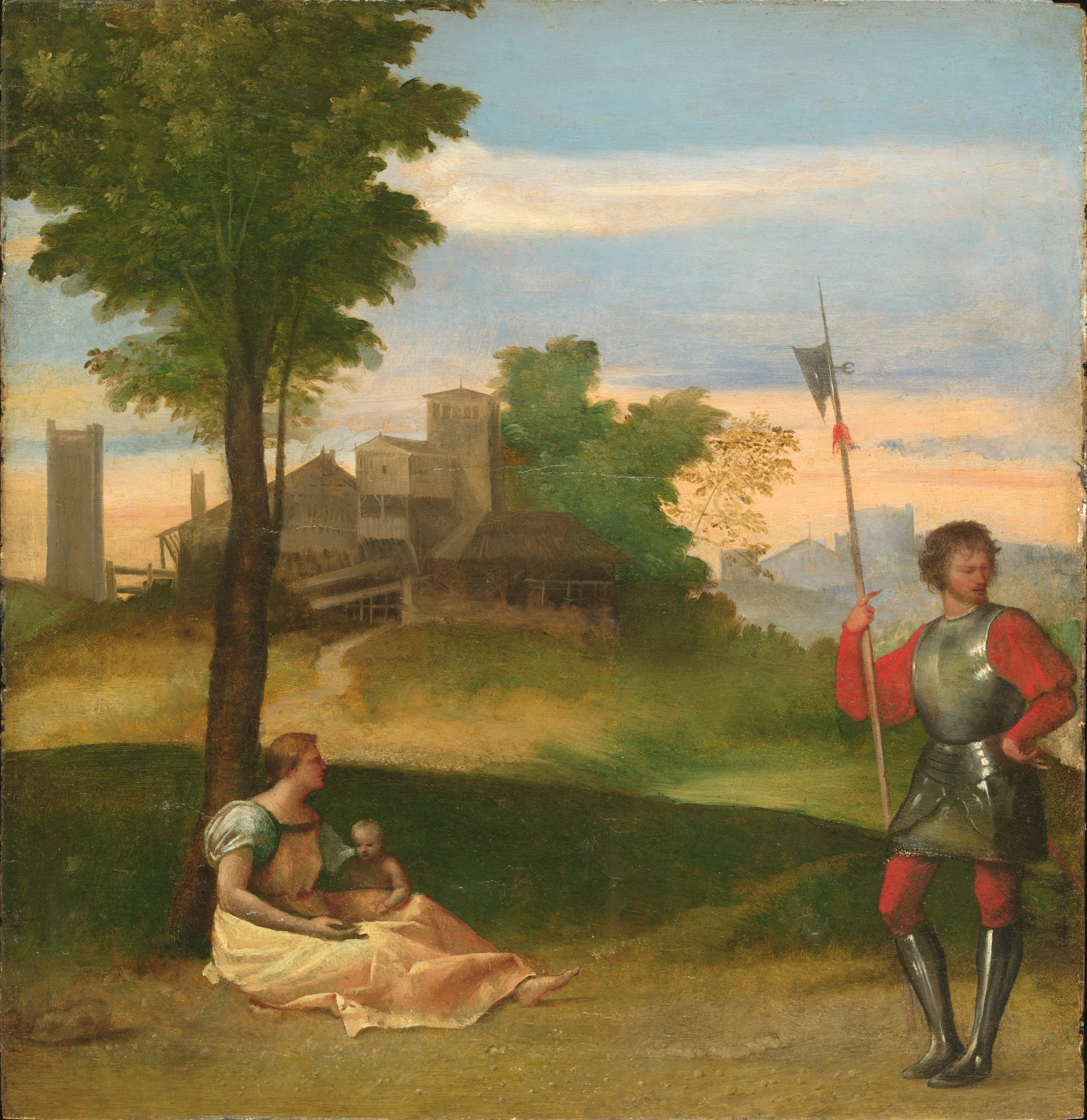
Titian, Rustic Idyll, 1507–1508

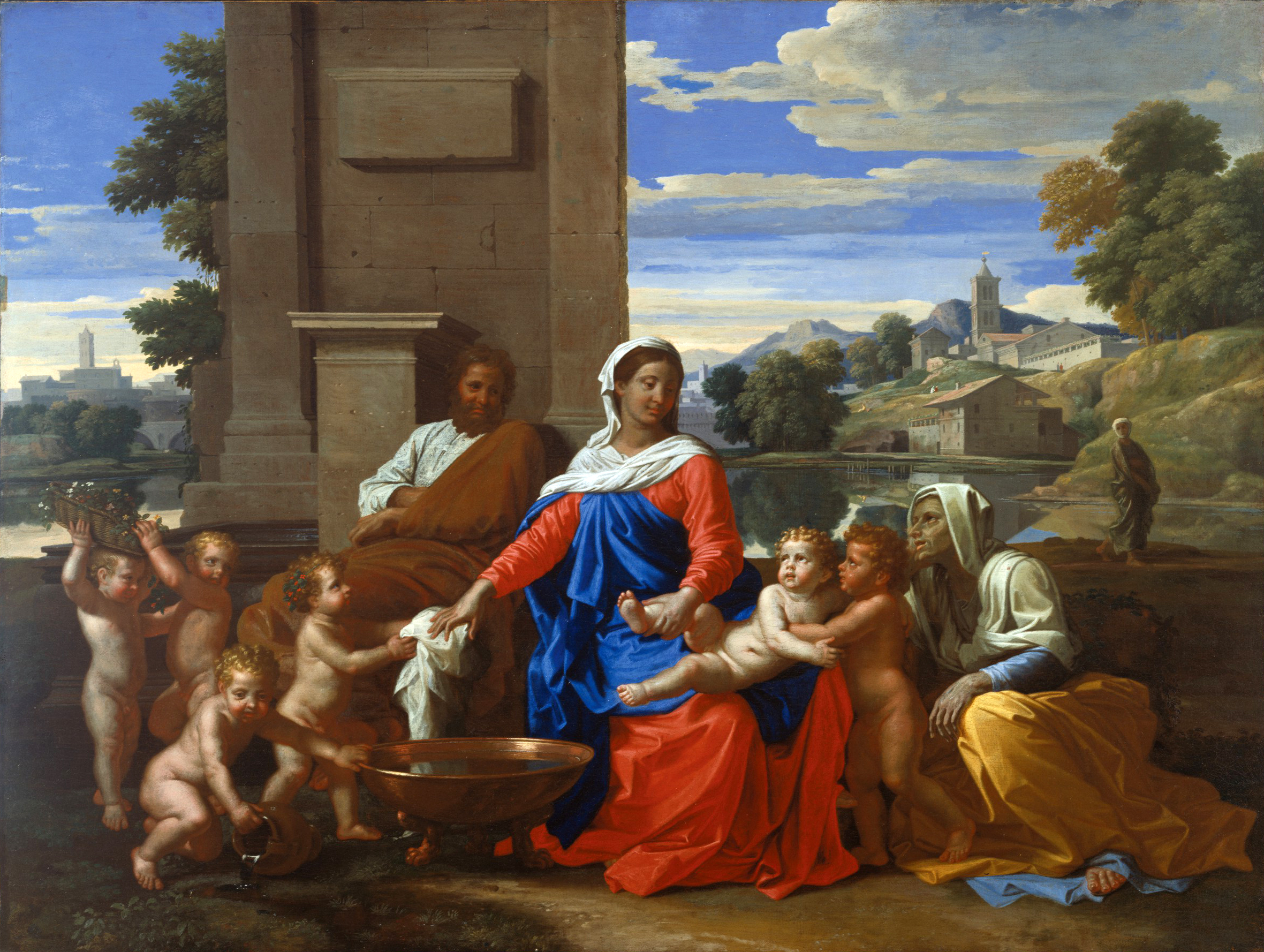
Nicolas Poussin, Holy Family, 1645–1650

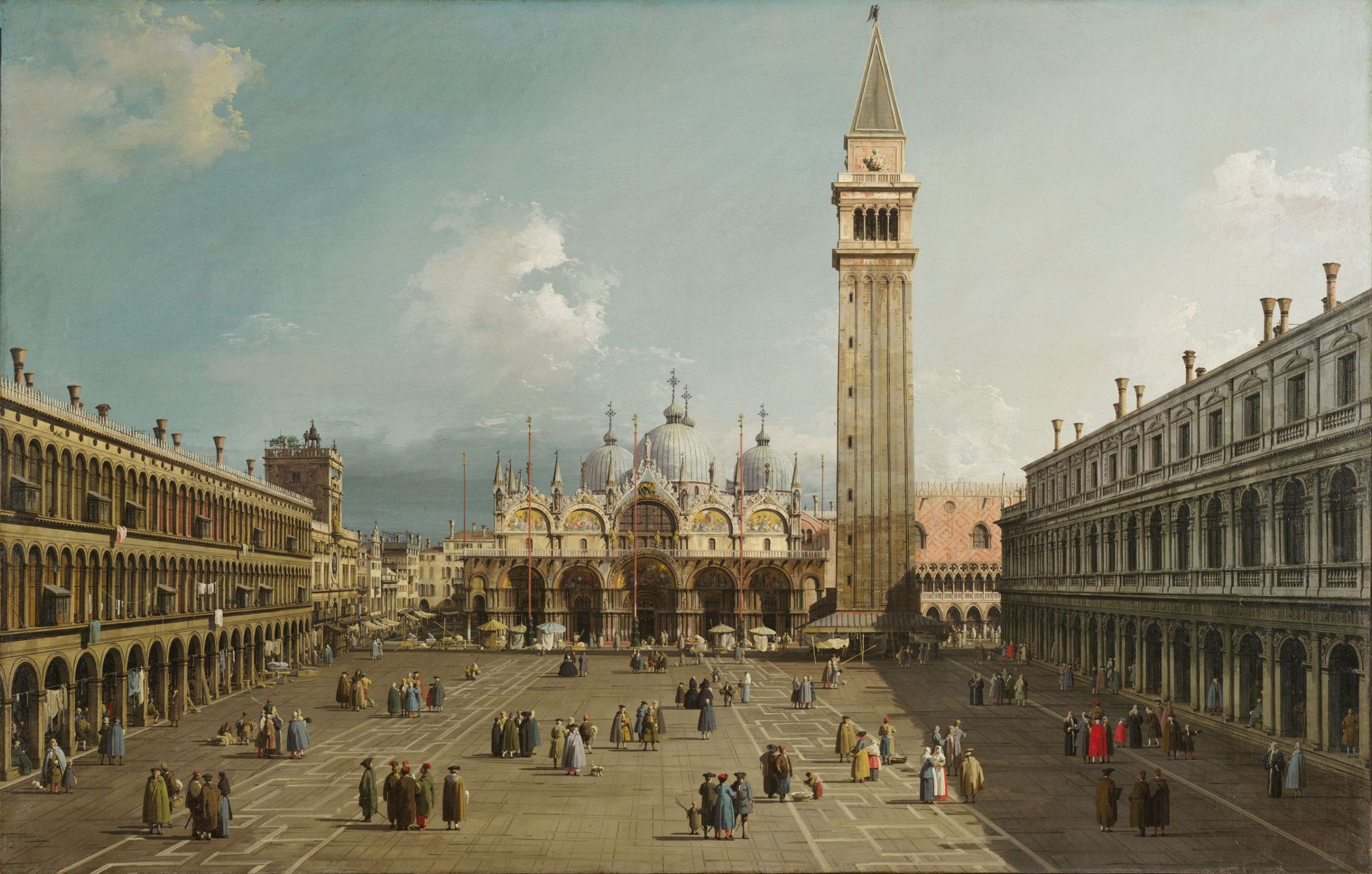
Canaletto, Piazza San Marco, Venice, c. 1730–1735

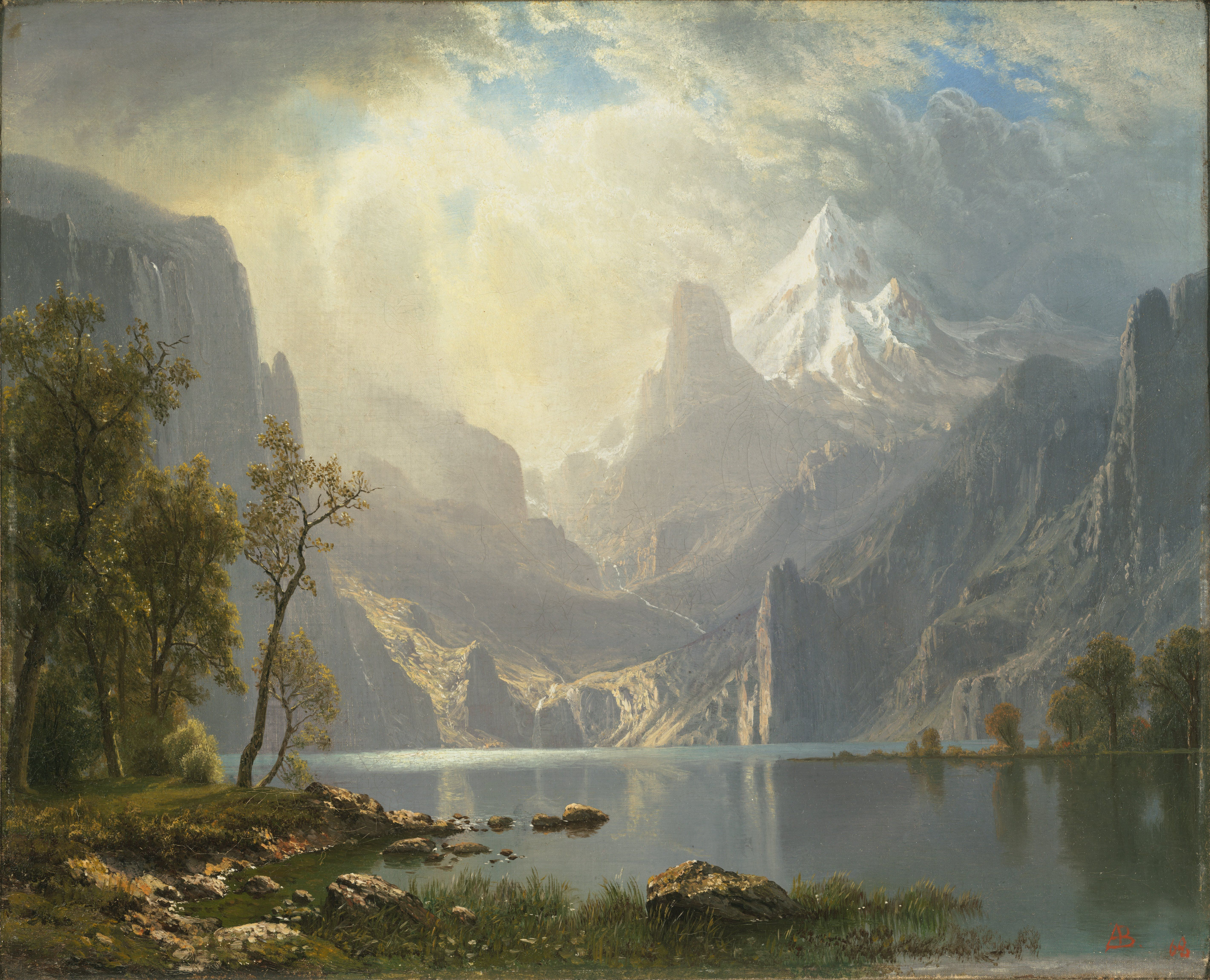
Albert Bierstadt, In the Sierras, 1868

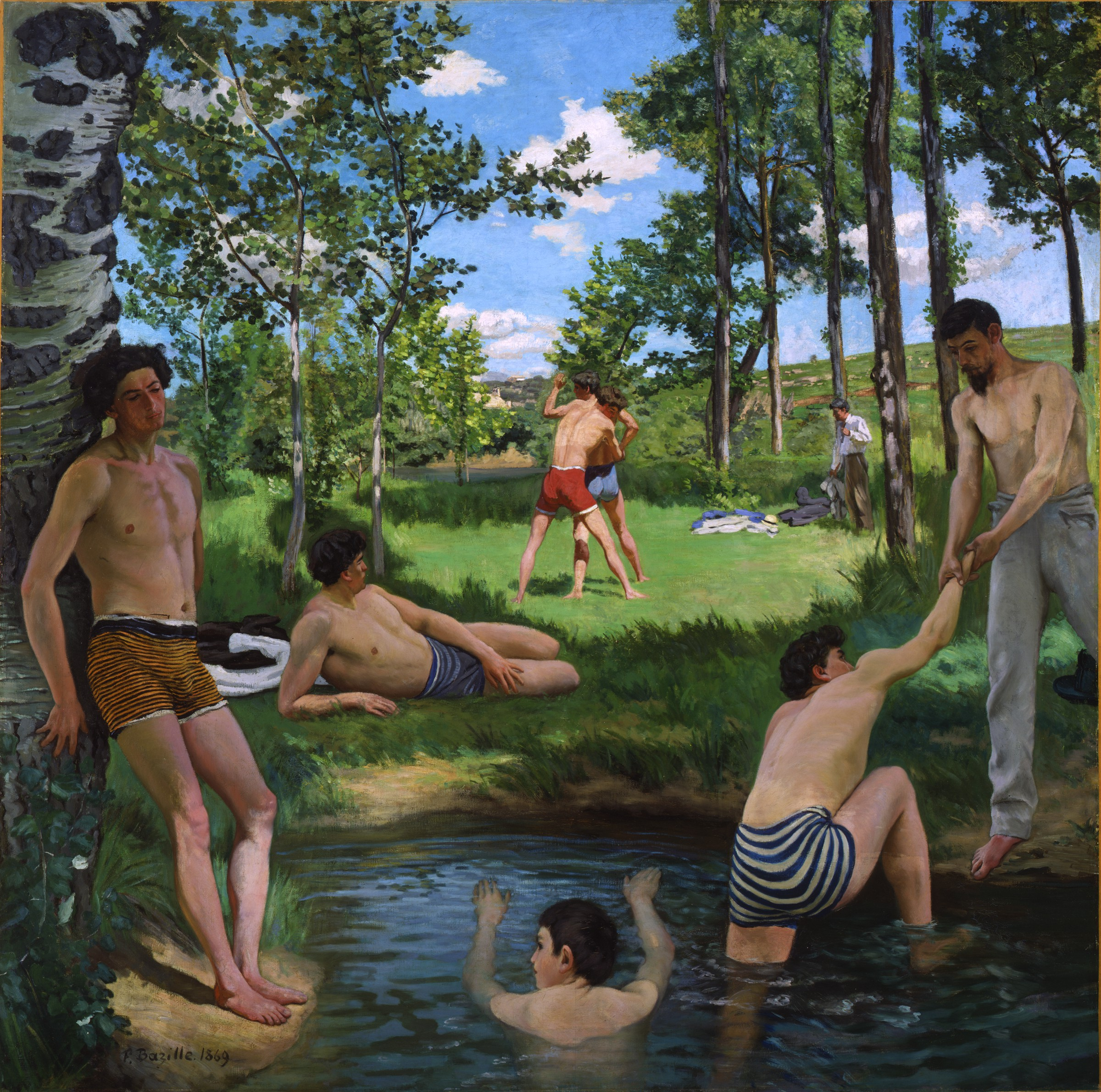
Frédéric Bazille, Summer Scene, 1869

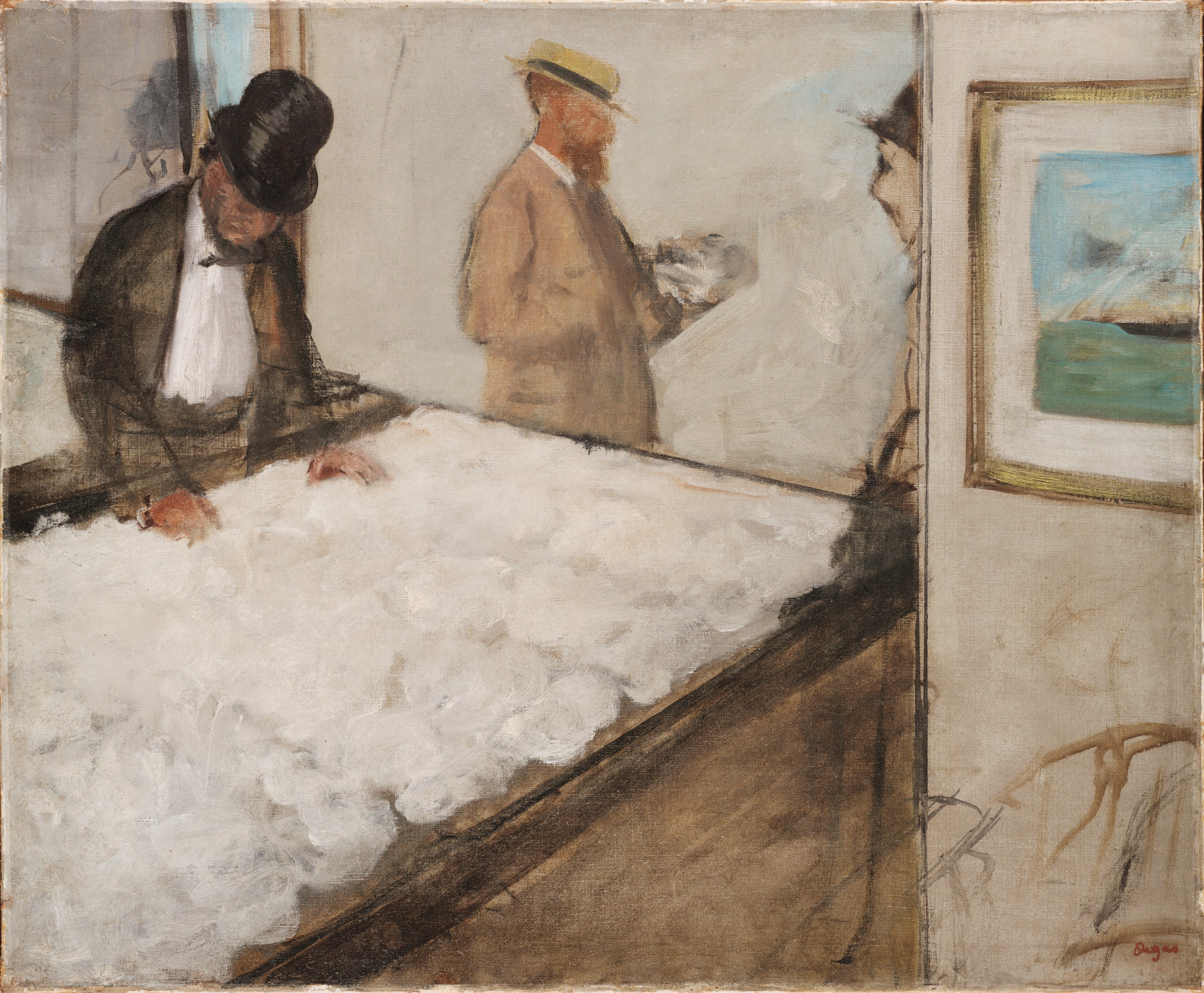
Edgar Degas, Cotton Merchants in New Orleans, 1873

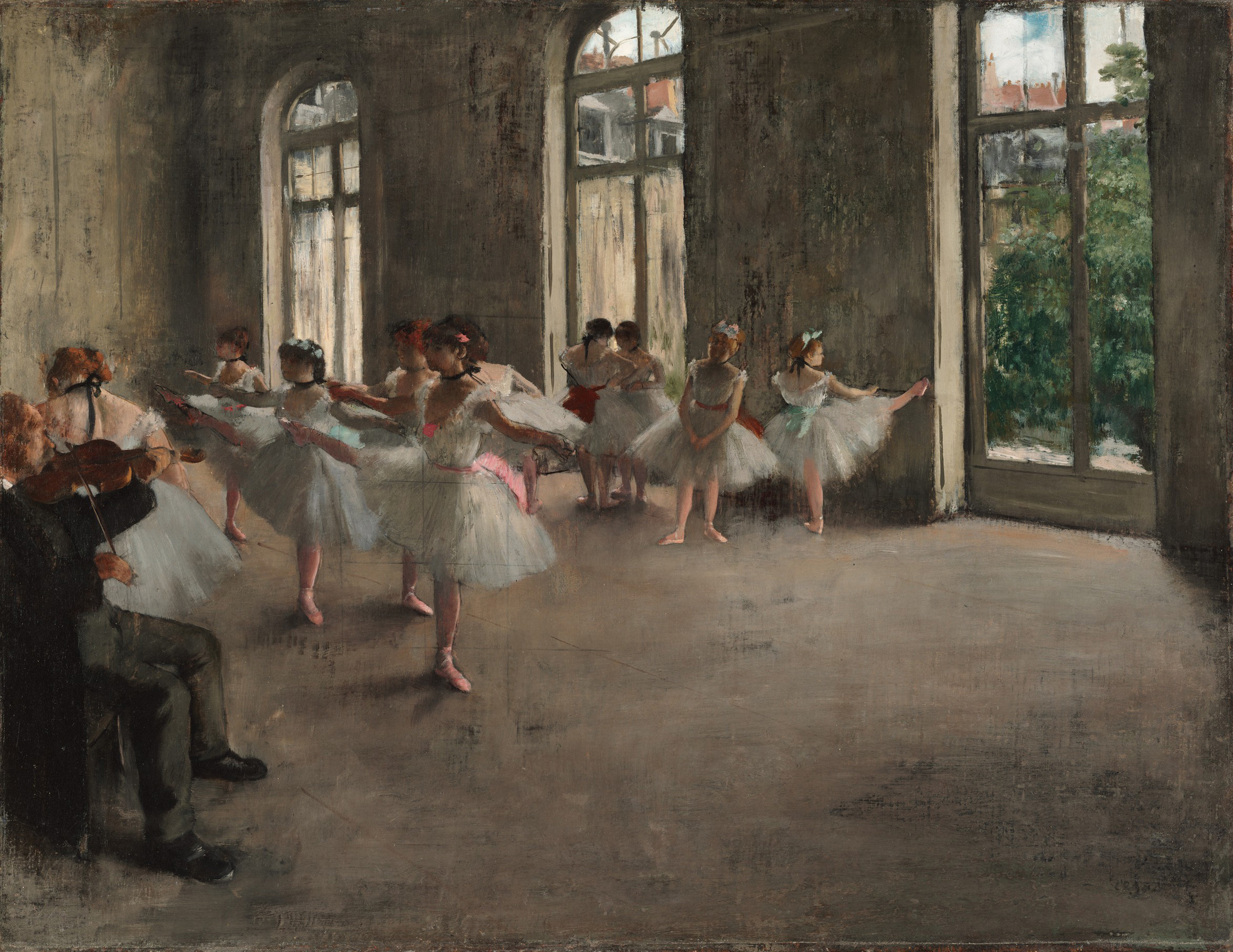
Edgar Degas, The Rehearsal, 1873

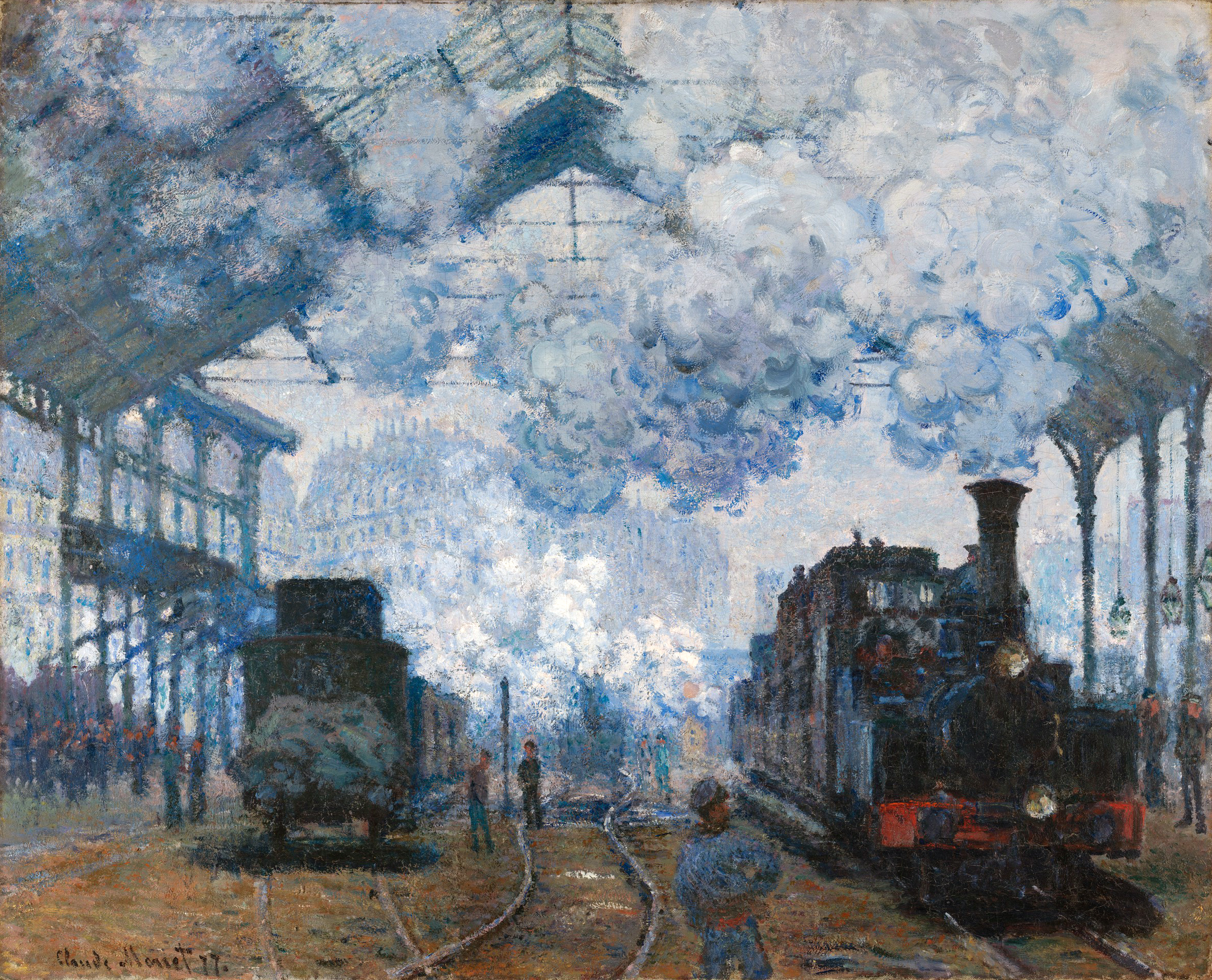
Claude Monet, The Gare Saint-Lazare, Arrival of a Train, 1877

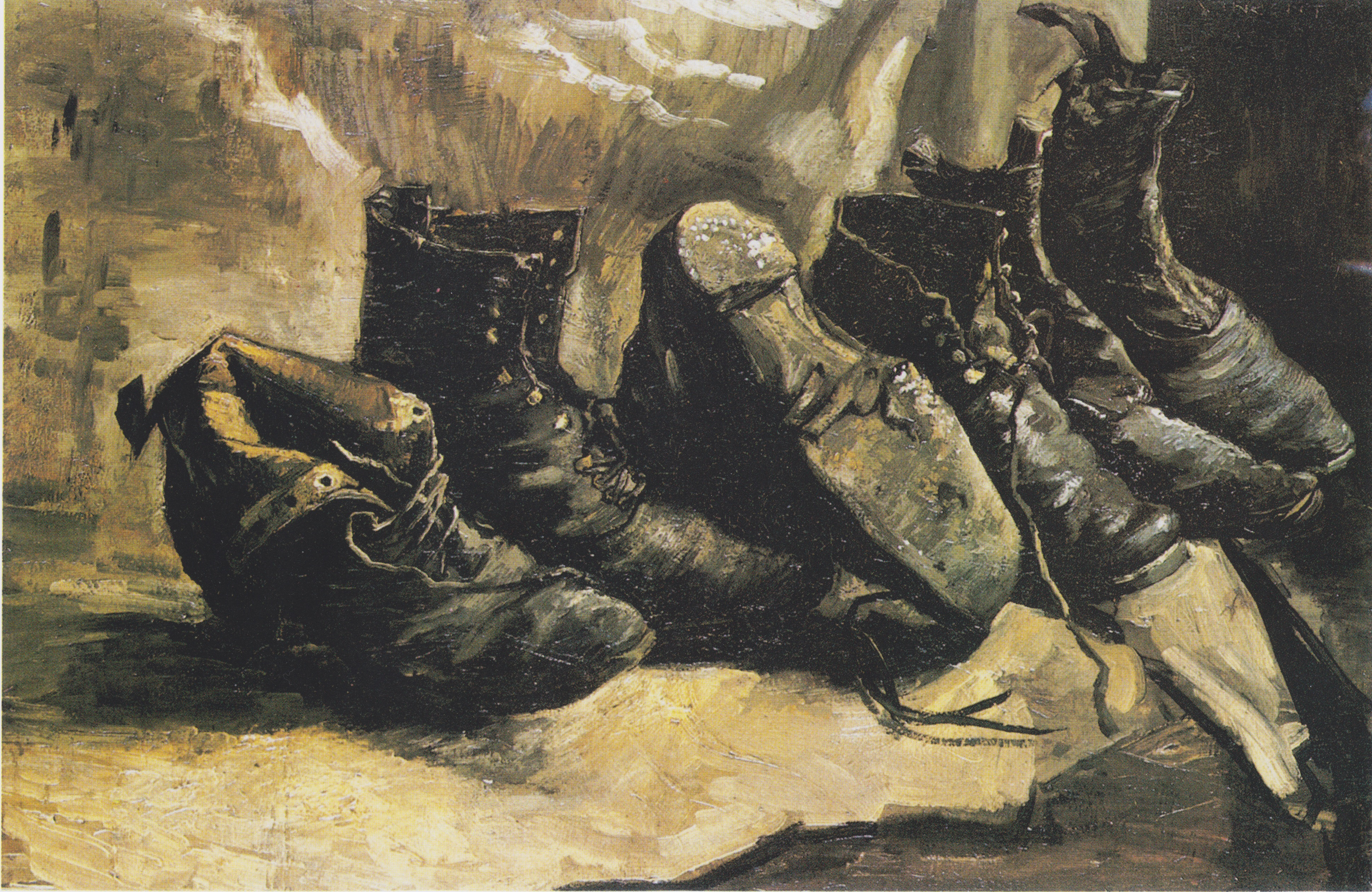
Vincent van Gogh, Three Pairs of Shoes, 1886

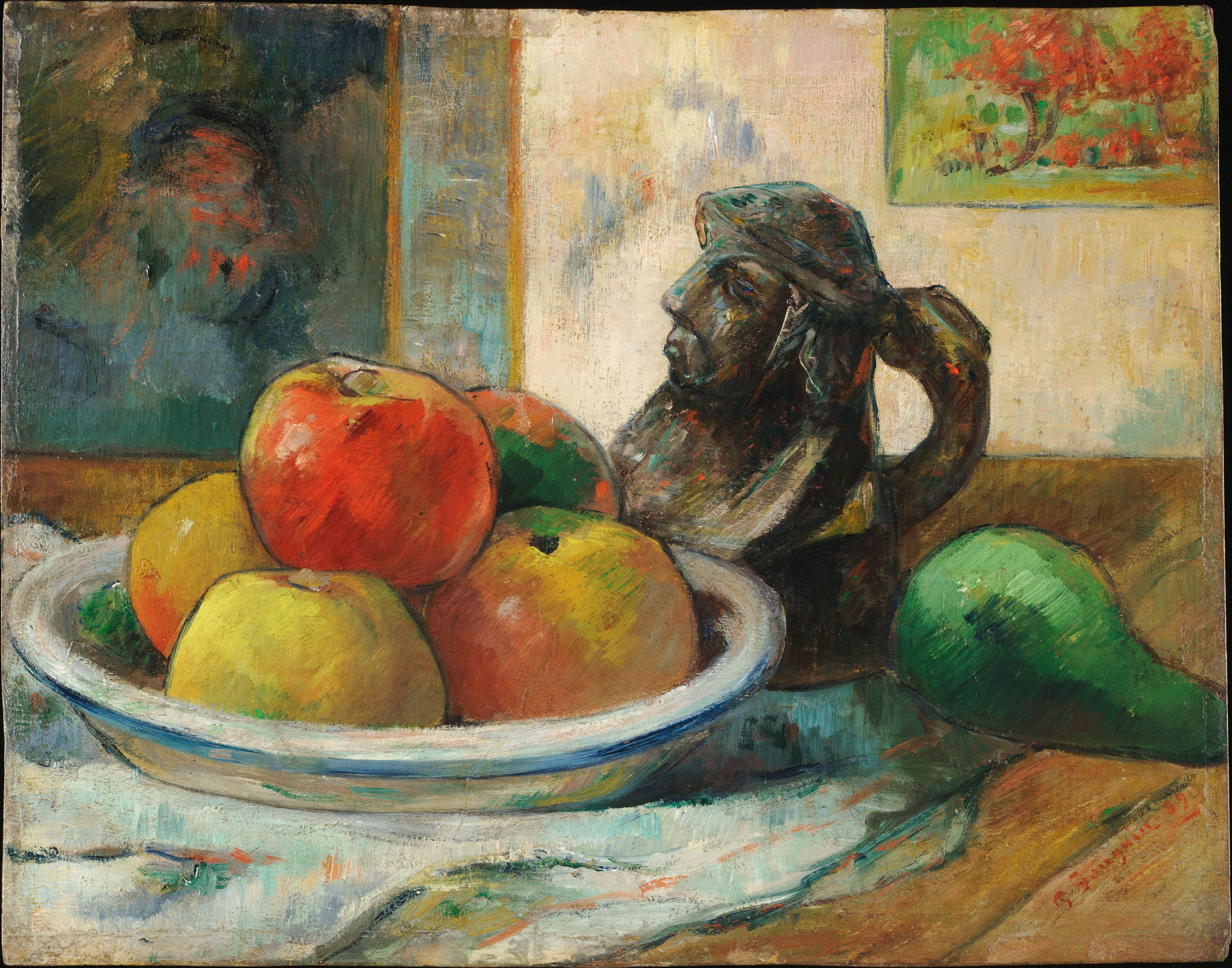
Paul Gauguin, Still Life with Apples, a Pear, and a Ceramic Portrait Jug, 1889

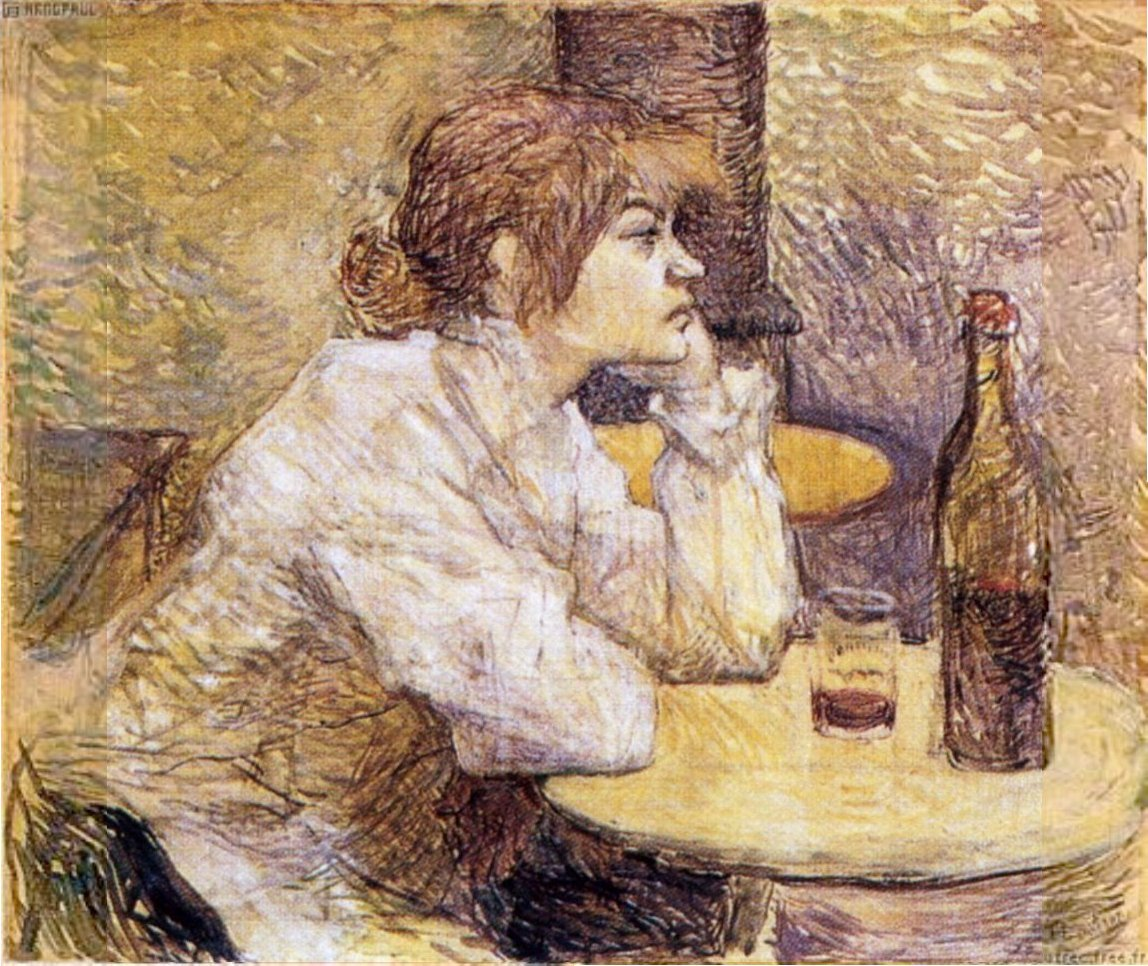
Henri de Toulouse-Lautrec, Gueule de bois ("Hangover"), c. 1888

Jean Metzinger, Landscape (Marine, Composition Cubiste), 1912
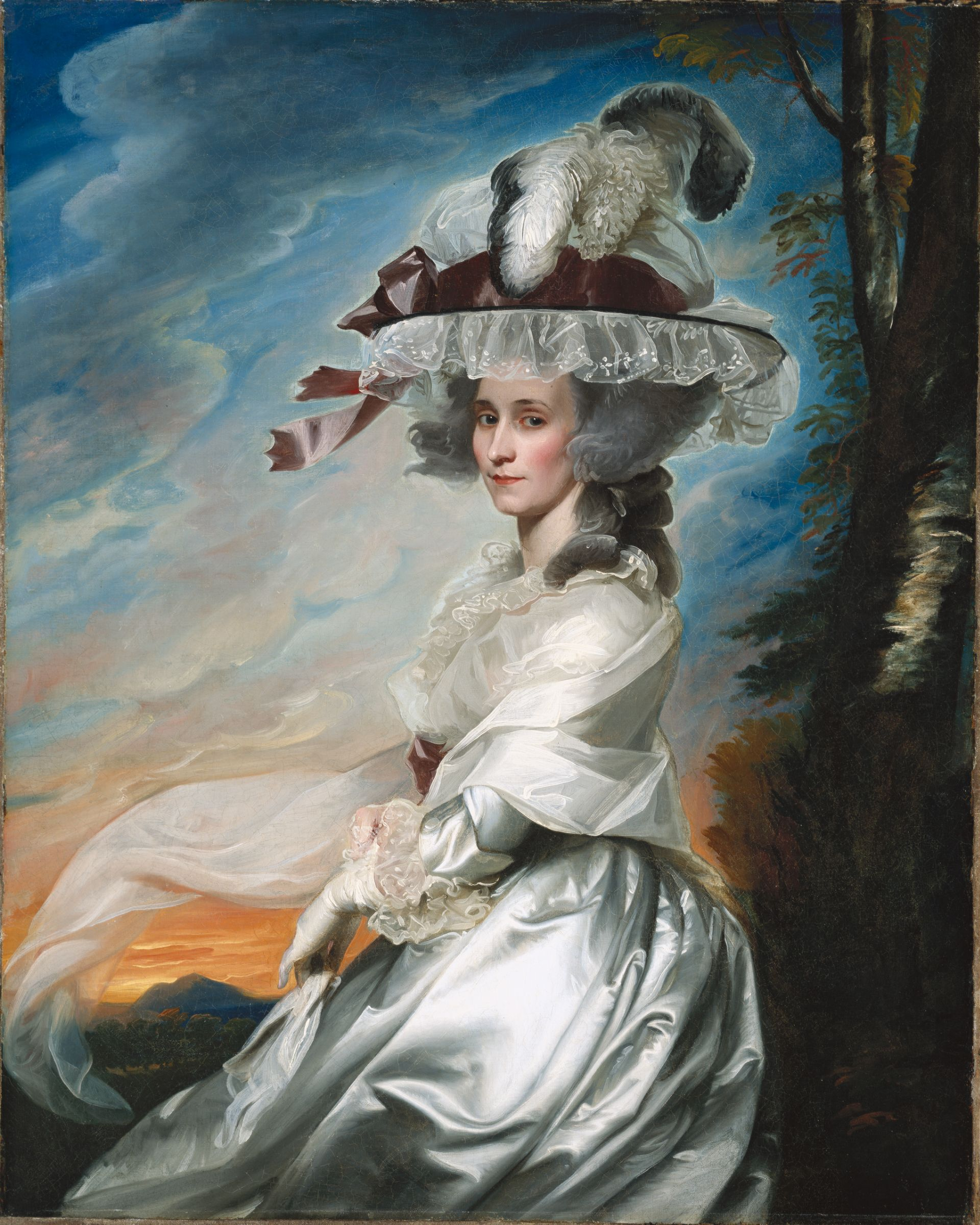
John Singleton Copley, Mrs. Daniel Denison Rogers (Abigail Bromfield), 1784

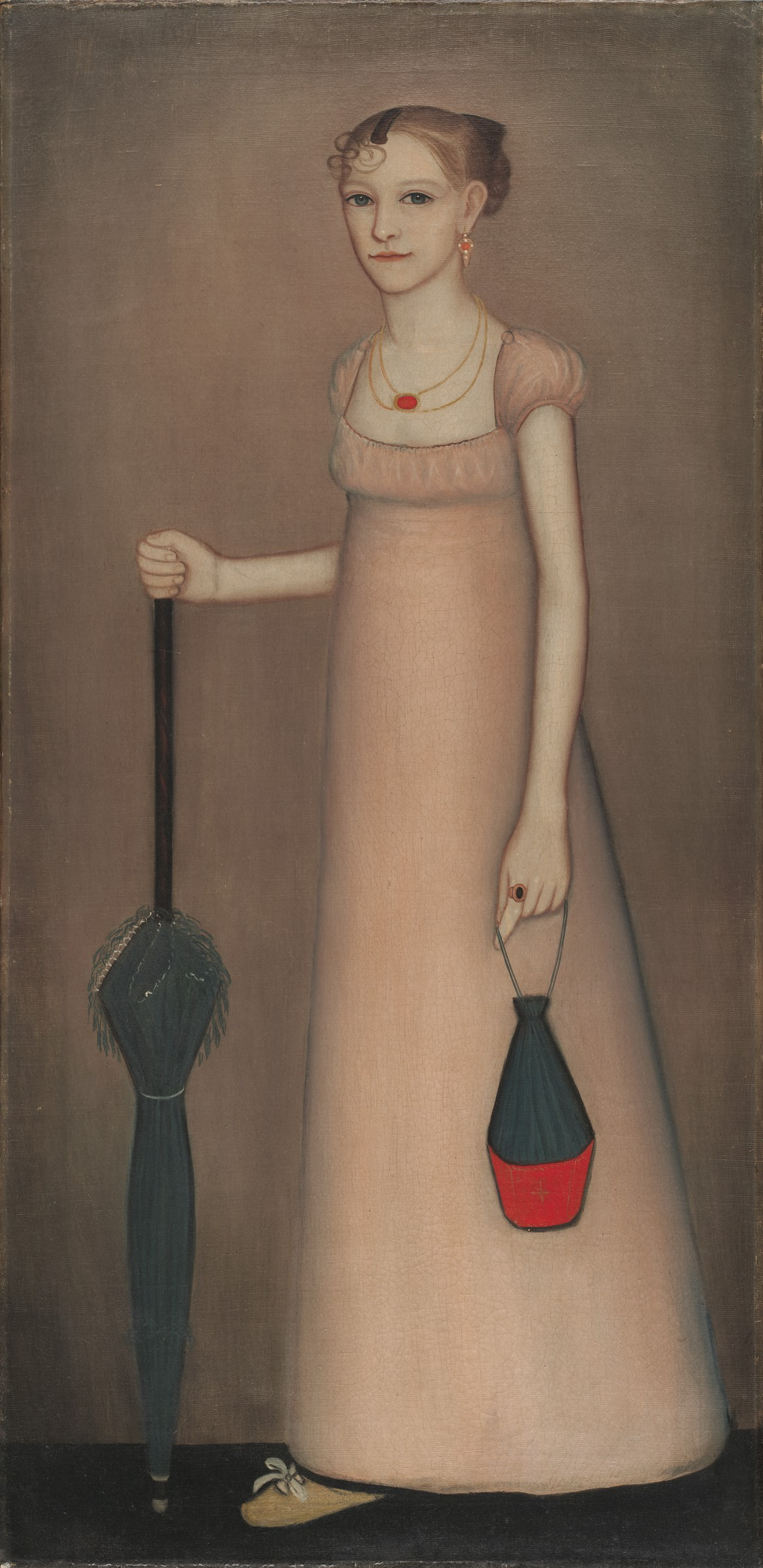
Ammi Phillips, Harriet Leavens, c. 1815

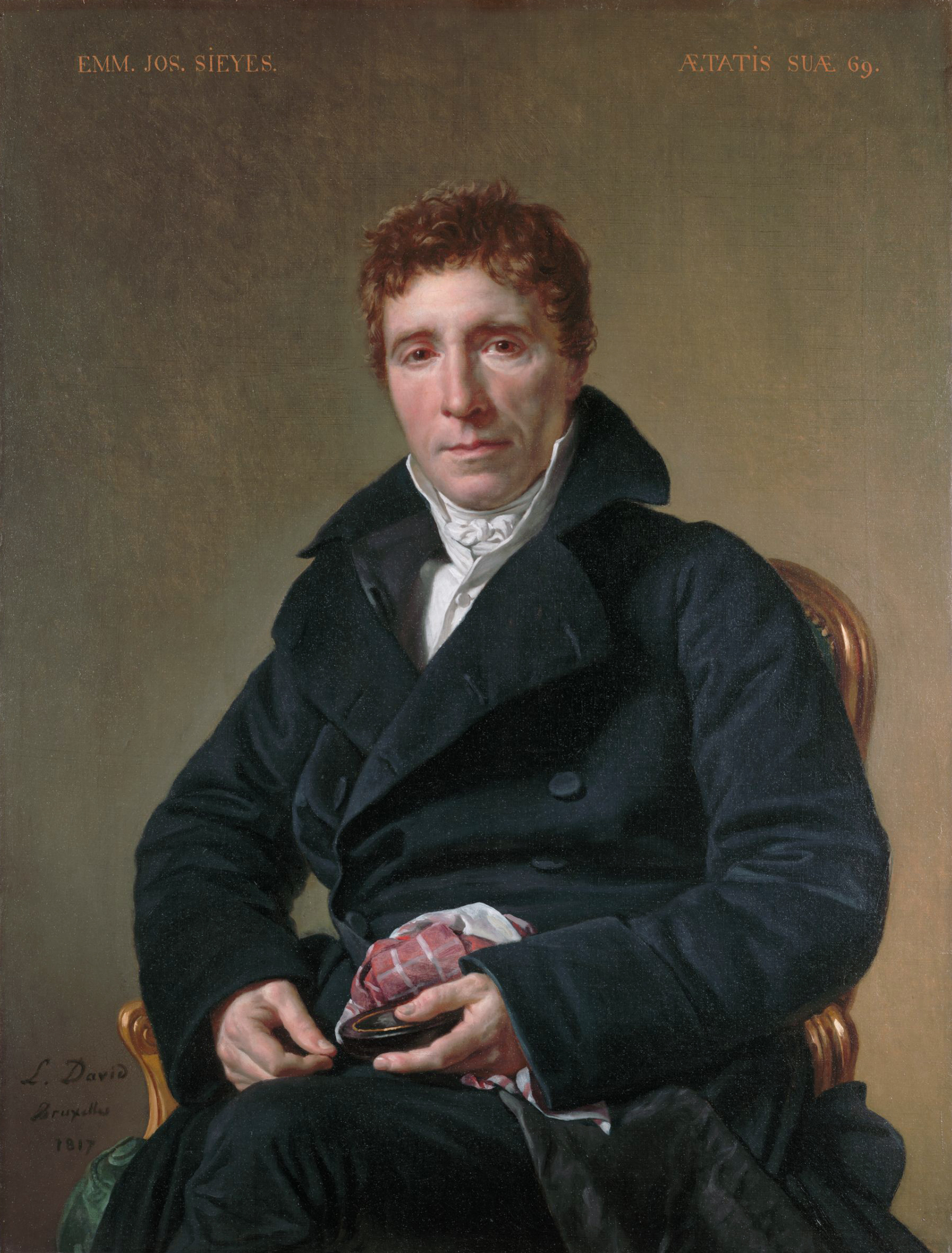
Jacques-Louis David, Emmanuel Joseph Sieyès, 1817

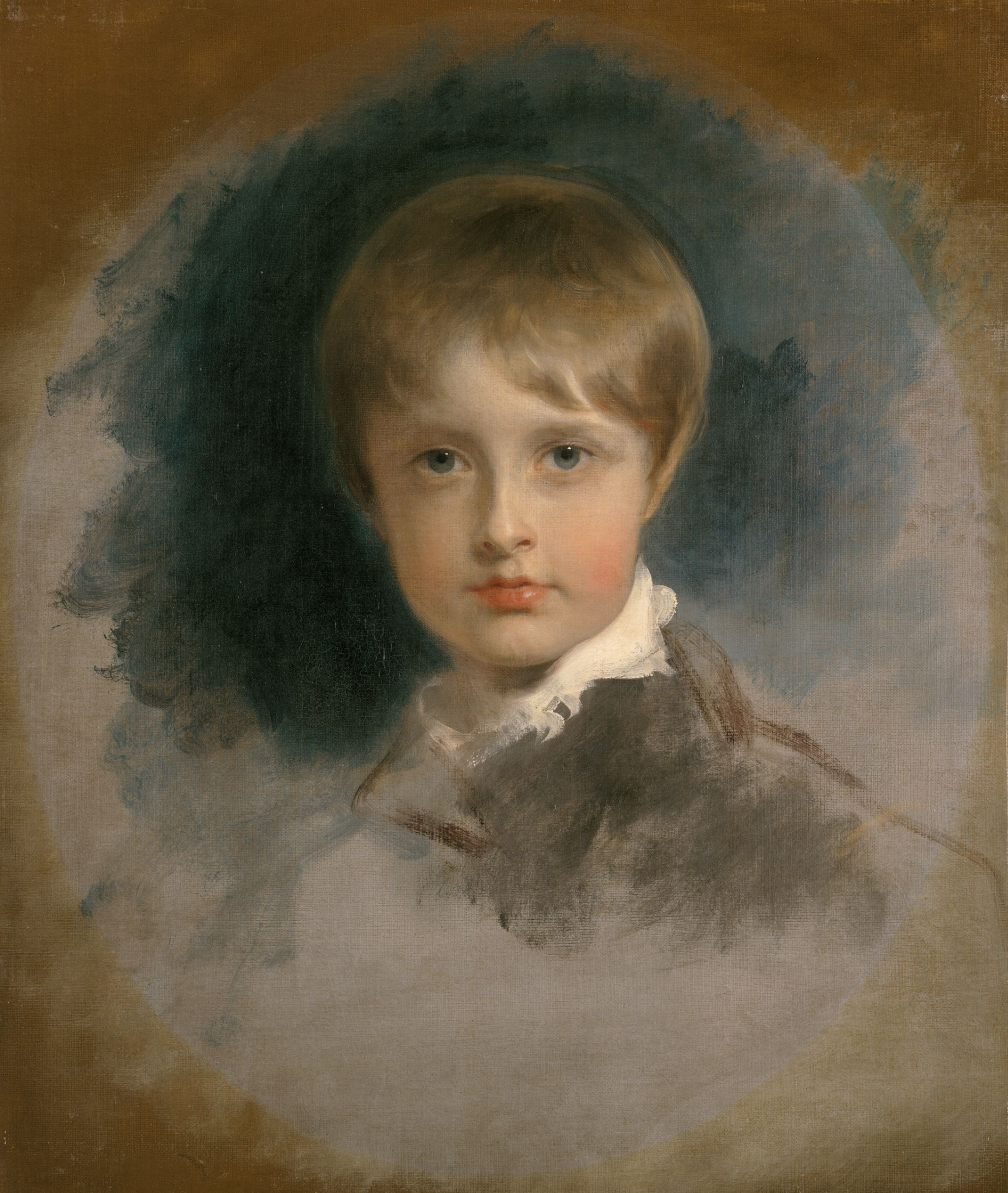
Thomas Lawrence, Portrait of Napoleon II, 1819

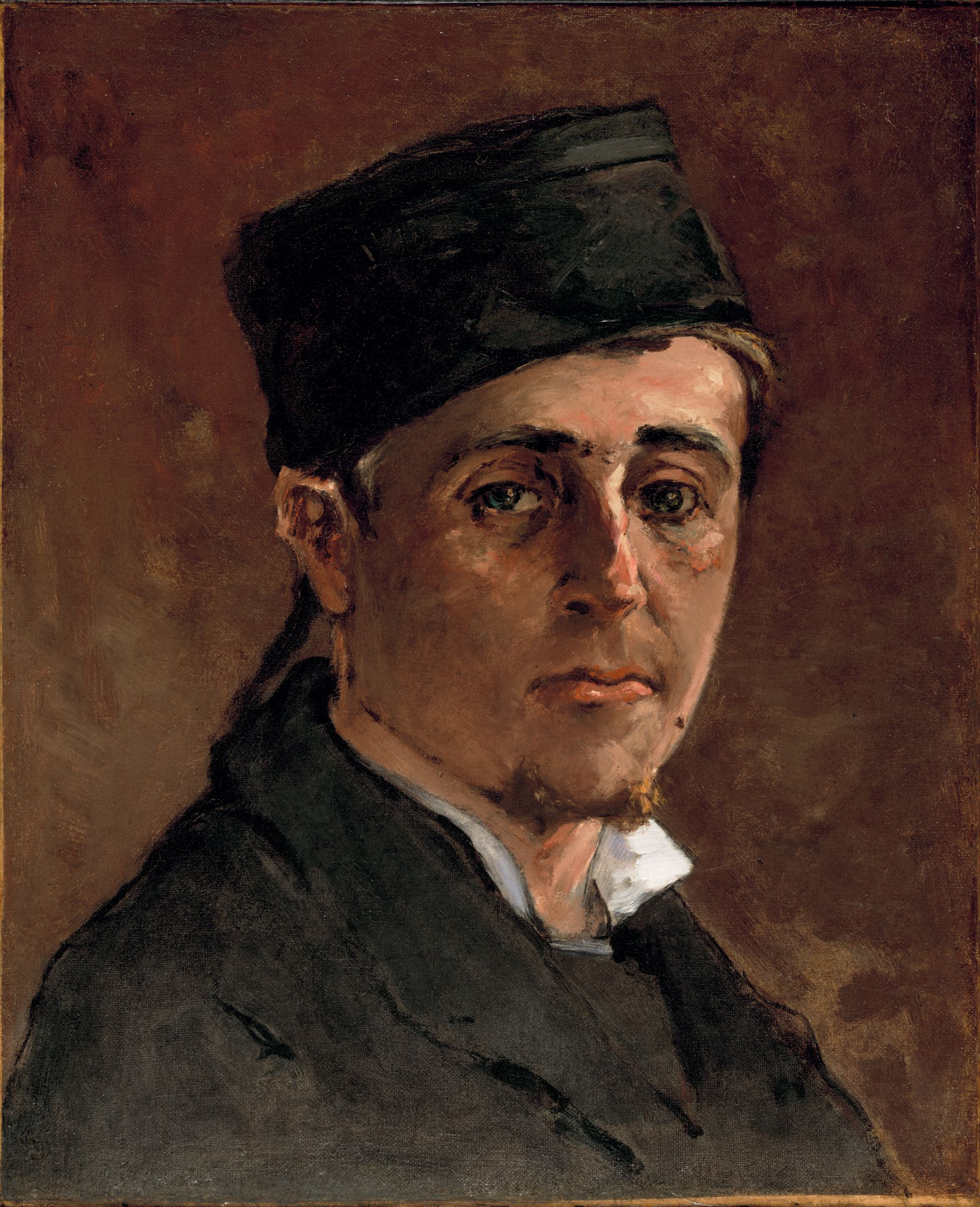
Paul Gauguin, Self portrait, c. 1875–1877

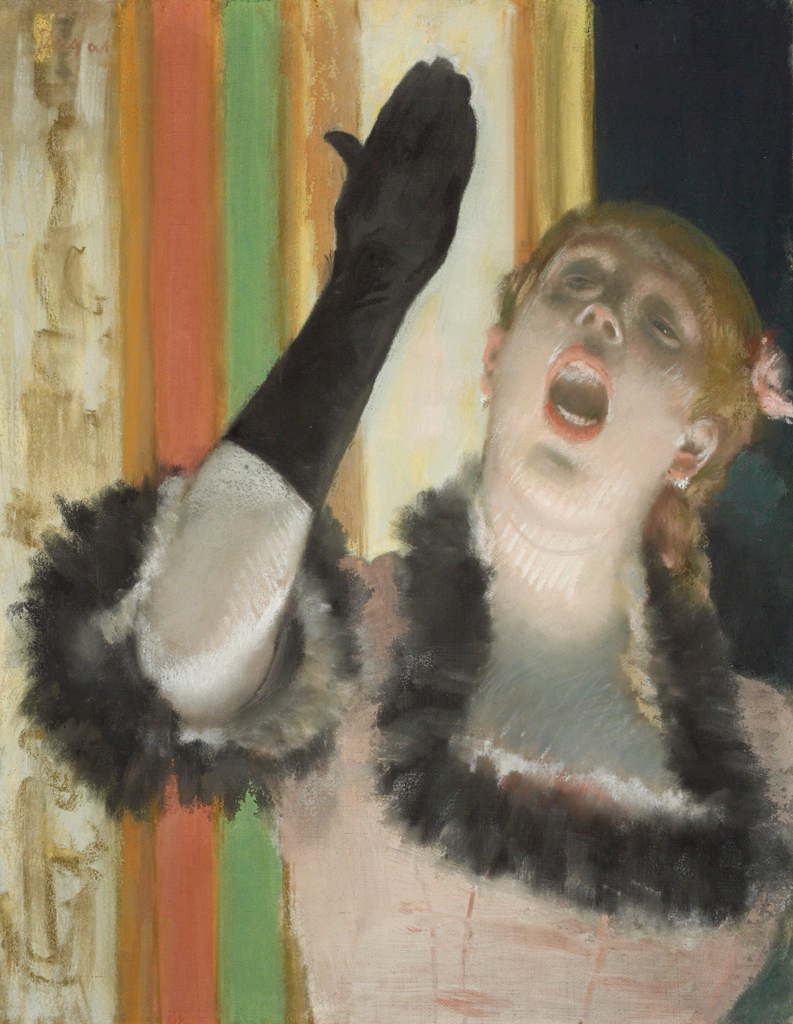
Edgar Degas, The Singer with the Glove, 1878

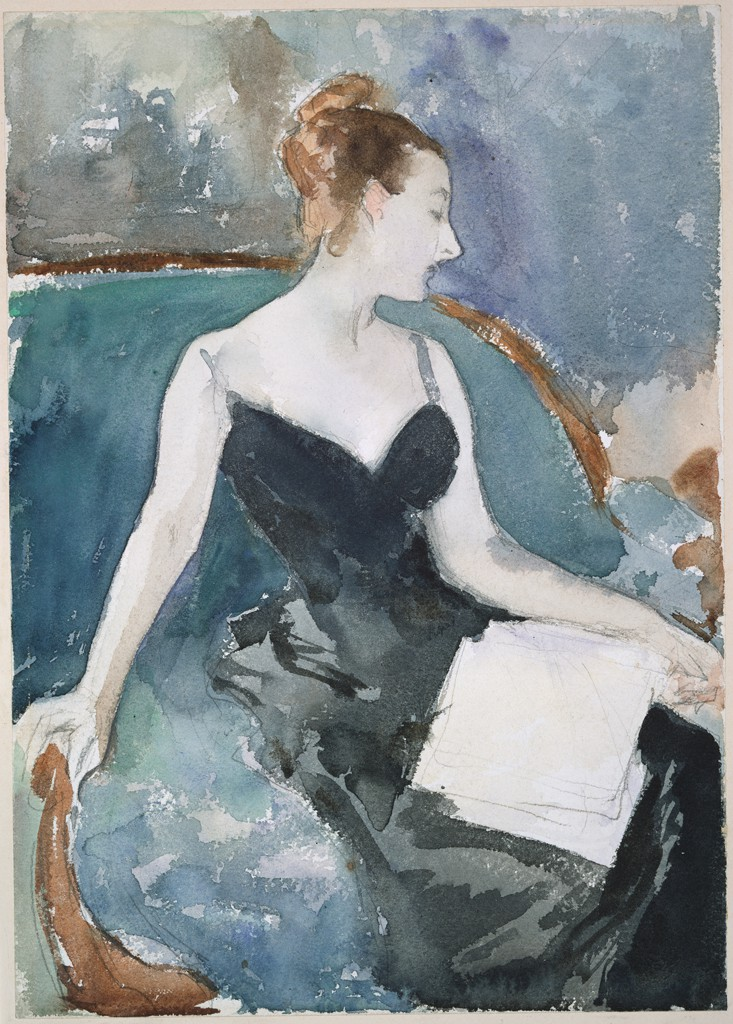
John Singer Sargent, Madame Gautreau (Madame X), c. 1883

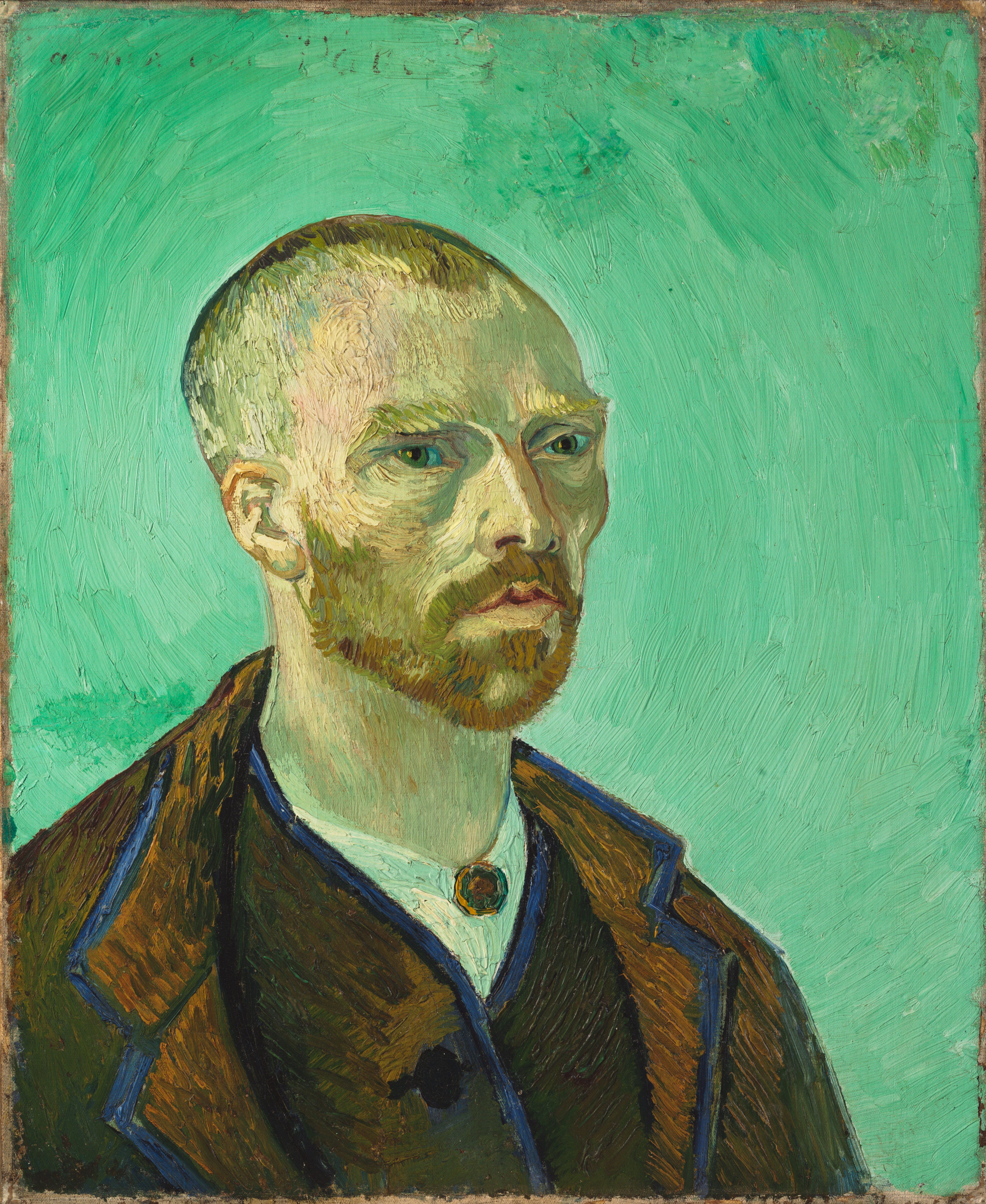
Vincent van Gogh, Self-portrait dedicated to Paul Gauguin, 1888

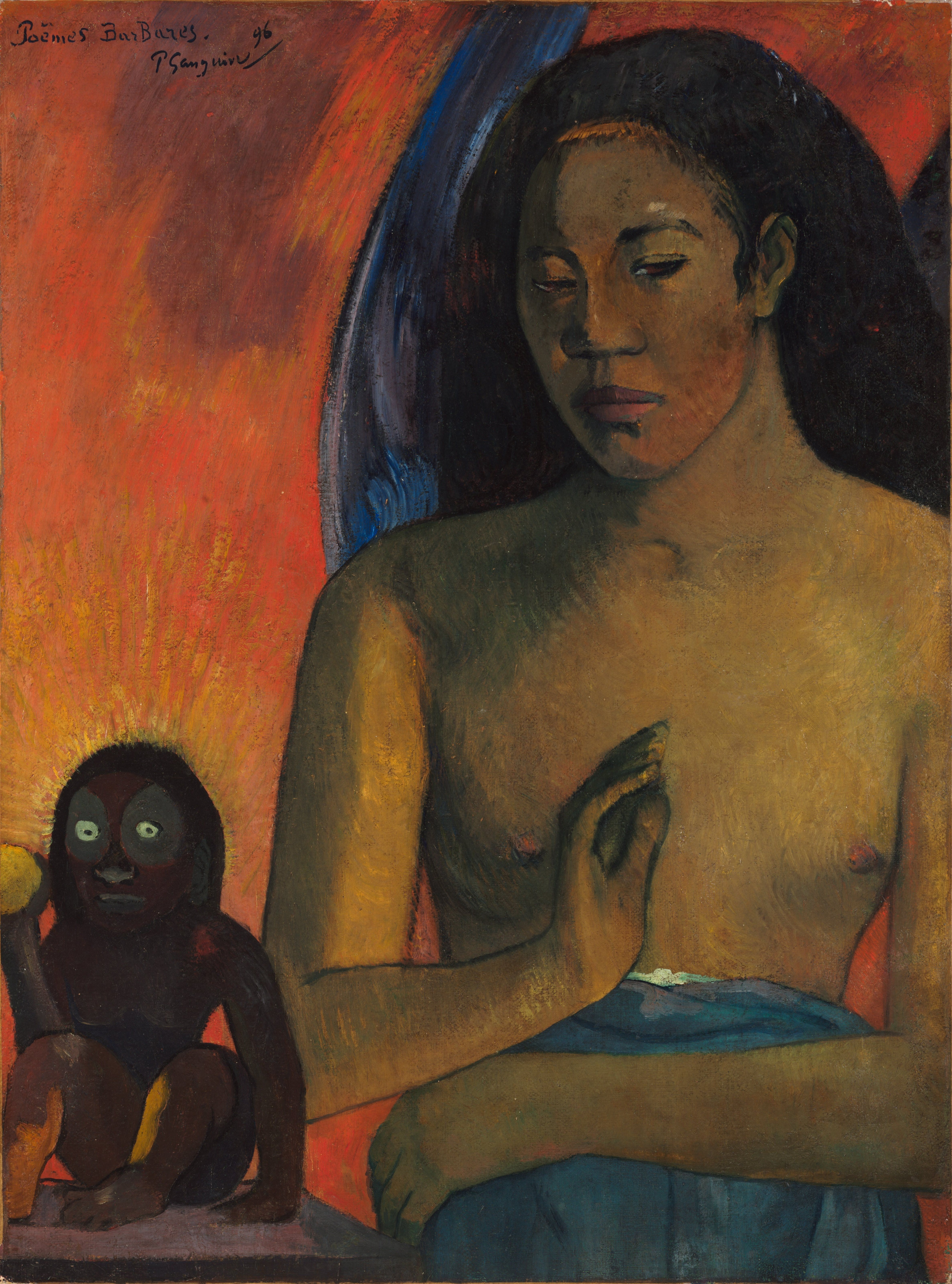
Paul Gauguin, Poèmes barbares, 1896

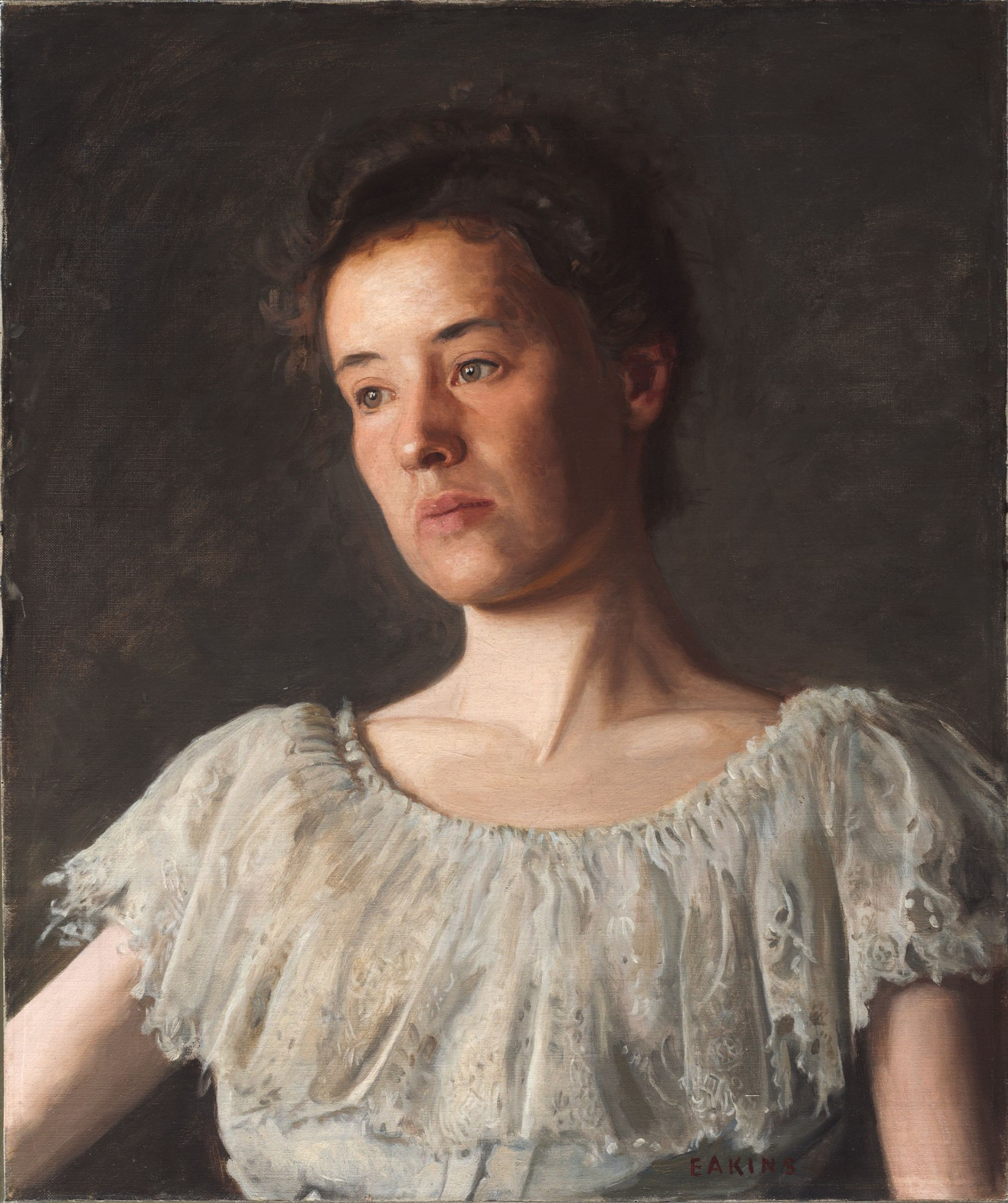
Thomas Eakins, Miss Alice Kurtz, 1903

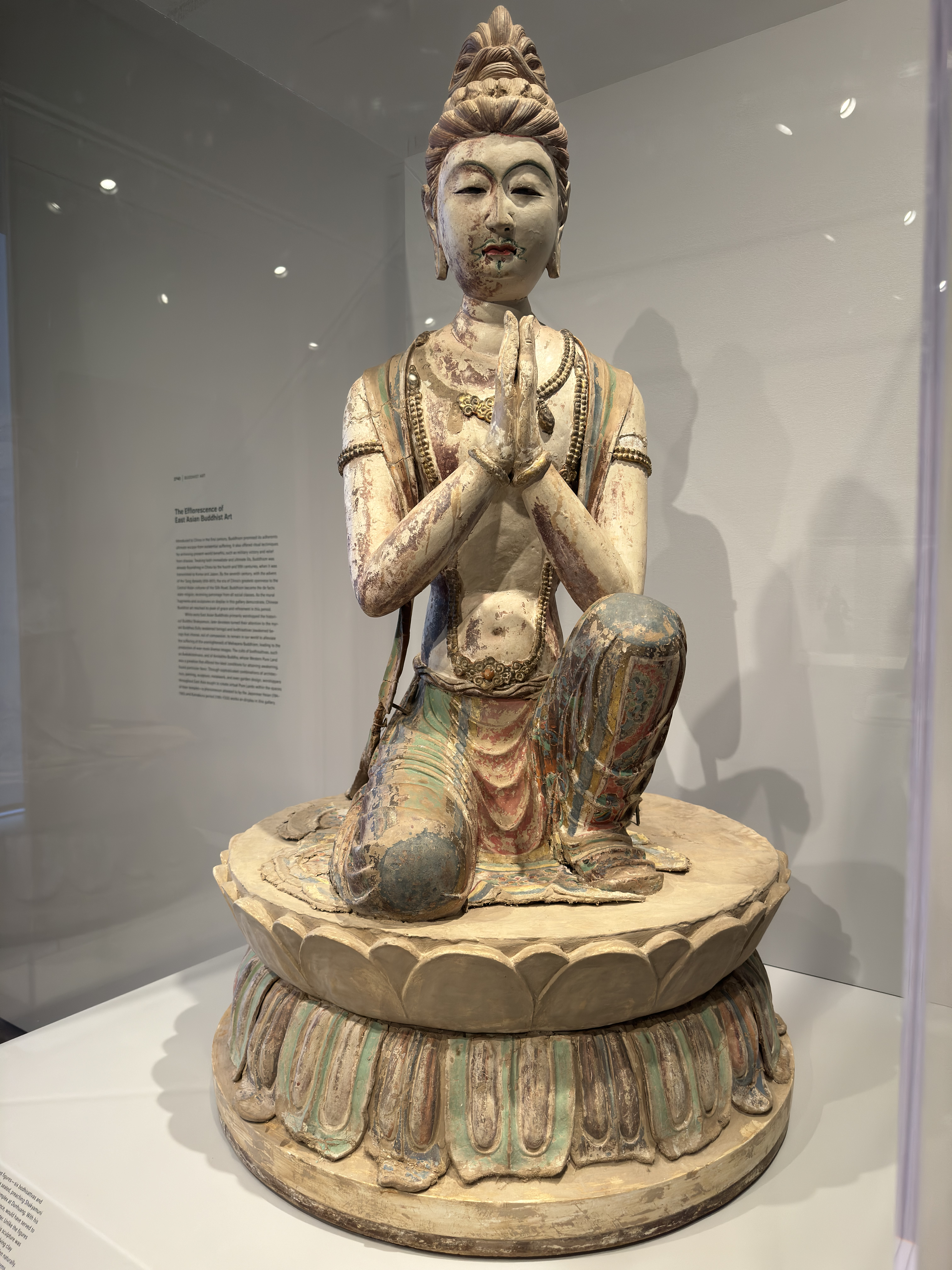
Kneeling Attendant Bodhisattva (Mogao Cave), 7th century

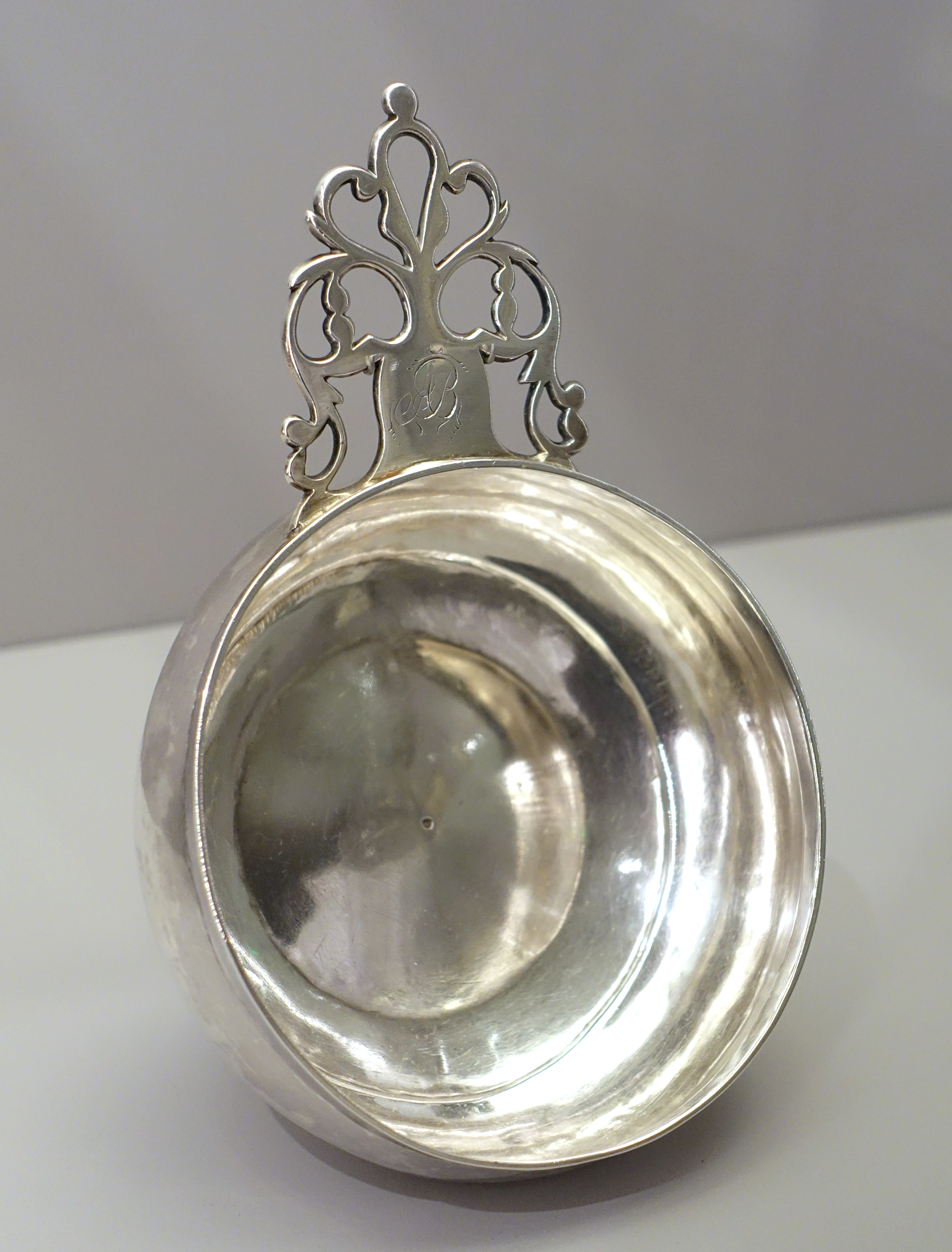
Silver porringer made by colonial silversmith Jacob Hurd, ca 1735

== Busch–Reisinger Museum ==
Founded in 1903 as the Germanic Museum, the Busch–Reisinger Museum was renamed in 1920 when it was moved to Adolphus Busch Hall, named after the brewer and philanthropist Adolphus Busch, former president of the Anheuser-Busch company. The museum's name also commemorates Busch's son-in-law Hugo Reisinger, a German-born American art collector and merchant.

The Busch-Reisinger is the only museum in North America dedicated to the study of art from the German-speaking countries of Central and Northern Europe in all media and in all periods. William James spoke at its dedication. Its holdings include significant works of Austrian Secession art, German expressionism, and 1920s abstraction. The museum holds one of the first and largest collections of artifacts related to the Bauhaus design school (1919–1933), which fostered many developments in modernist design. Other strengths include late medieval sculpture and 18th-century art. The museum also holds noteworthy postwar and contemporary art from German-speaking Europe, including works by Georg Baselitz, Anselm Kiefer, Gerhard Richter, and one of the world's most comprehensive collections of works by Joseph Beuys.

The Busch–Reisinger Art Museum has oil paintings by artists Lovis Corinth, Max Liebermann, Gustav Klimt, Edvard Munch, Paula Modersohn-Becker, Max Ernst, Ernst Ludwig Kirchner, Franz Marc, Karl Schmidt-Rottluff, Emil Nolde, Erich Heckel, Heinrich Hoerle, Georg Baselitz, László Moholy-Nagy, and Max Beckmann. It has sculpture by Alfred Barye, Käthe Kollwitz, George Minne, and Ernst Barlach.

From 1921 to 1991, the Busch–Reisinger was located in Adolphus Busch Hall at 29 Kirkland Street. The Hall continues to house the Busch–Reisinger's founding collection of medieval plaster casts and an exhibition on the history of the Busch–Reisinger Museum; it also hosts concerts on its Flentrop pipe organ. In 1991, the Busch–Reisinger moved to the new Werner Otto Hall, designed by Gwathmey Siegel & Associates, at 32 Quincy Street.

In 2018, Busch–Reisinger featured the exhibition Inventur–Art in Germany, 1943–55, which was named after a 1945 poem by Günter Eich. In 2019, The Bauhaus and Harvard celebrated the centennial of the founding of the influential design school in Germany. Following its closure by the Nazis in 1933, a number of its former students and faculty made their way to Harvard, where they continued and expanded their work.

=== Curators ===
- Kuno Francke, 1903–1930
- Charles L. Kuhn, 1930–1968
- Peter Nisbet
- Lynette Roth

== Arthur M. Sackler Museum ==
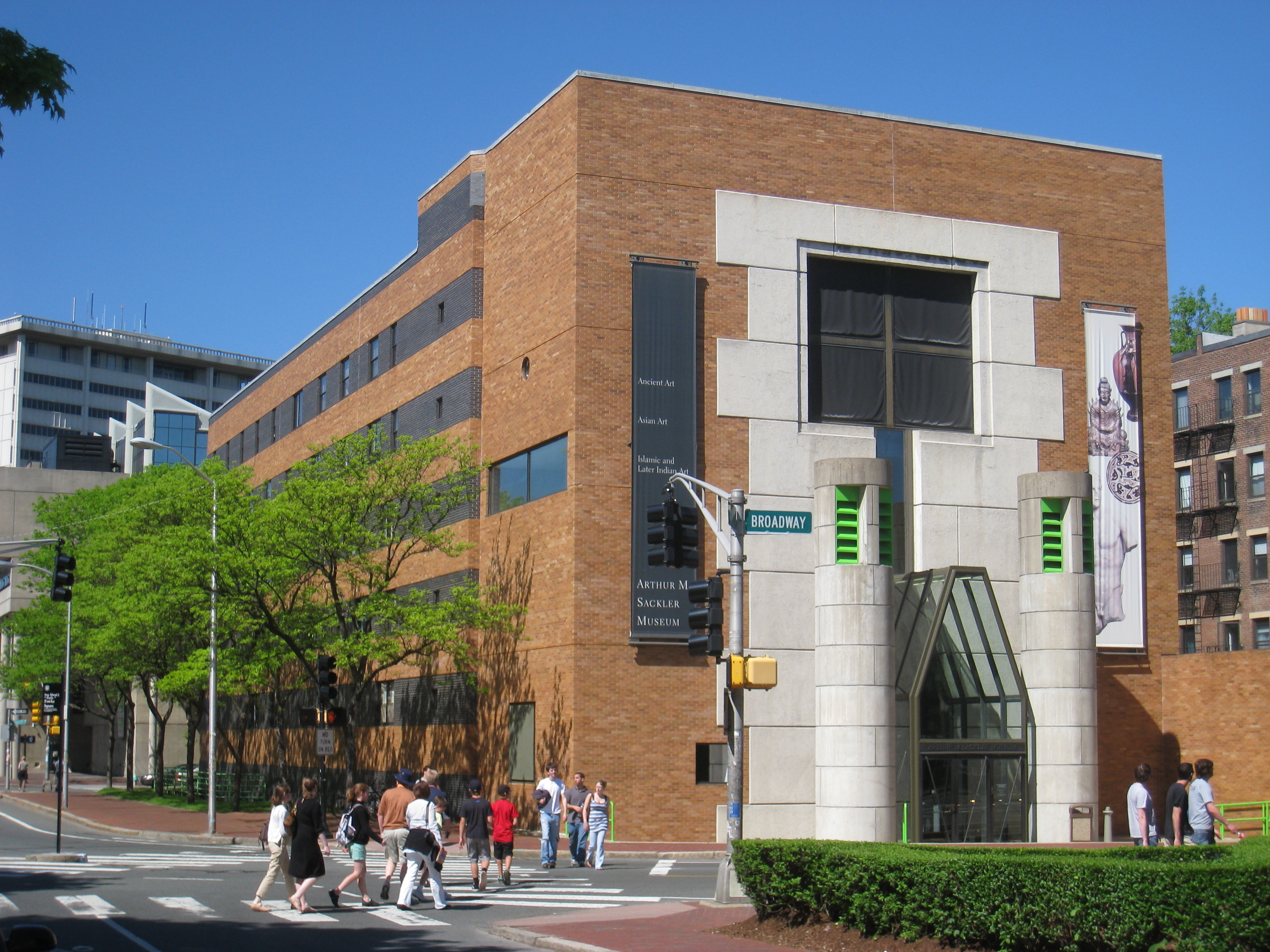
The Sackler Building is no longer used for public exhibition spaces, but still houses academic classrooms and staff offices

The Arthur M. Sackler Museum opened in 1985, and was located at 485 Broadway, directly across the street from the original Fogg Museum building. The Sackler building, designed by British architect James Stirling, was named for its major donor Arthur M. Sackler, who was a psychiatrist, entrepreneur, and philanthropist. Upon its opening in 1984, the building also housed new offices for the History of Art and Architecture faculty, as well as the Digital Images and Slides Collection of the Fine Arts Library. The Sackler building continues to house the History of Art and Architecture Department and the Media Slide Library.

=== Naming controversy ===
Since at least 2018, critics and protestors have called for Harvard to remove the "Sackler" family name from the building and the museum, citing its connection to the aggressive marketing of the addictive drug OxyContin. Defenders have pointed out that Arthur M. Sackler died in 1987, before the development of the opioid problems of the 21st century. This argument is rebutted by activists, who charge that Arthur Sackler promoted Valium and set up an unethical system of marketing drugs that continued after his death. On April 20, 2023, at least 50 protesters associated with the advocacy group P.A.I.N. staged a "die-in" in the atrium of the Harvard Art Museum, promoting continuing efforts to dename Sackler facilities at Harvard. A Harvard spokesman confirmed that Harvard has been considering a proposal to remove the Sackler name since October 2022.

=== Collection ===
The museum collection holds important collections of Asian art, most notably, archaic Chinese jades (the widest collection outside of China) and Japanese surimono, as well as outstanding Chinese bronzes, ceremonial weapons, Buddhist cave-temple sculptures, ceramics from China and Korea, Japanese works on paper, and lacquer boxes. The ancient Mediterranean and Byzantine collections comprise significant works in all media from Greece, Rome, Egypt, and the Near East. Strengths include Greek vases, small bronzes, and coins from throughout the ancient Mediterranean world. The museum also holds works on paper from Islamic lands and India, including paintings, drawings, calligraphy, and manuscript illustrations, with particular strength in Rajput art, as well as important Islamic ceramics from the 8th through to the 19th century.

=== Architecture ===
The Sackler building, which was originally designed as an extension to the Fogg Museum, elicited worldwide attention from the time of Harvard's commission of Stirling to design the building, following a selection process that evaluated more than 70 architects. The university mounted an exhibition of the architects' preliminary design drawings in 1981 (James Stirling's Design to Expand the Fogg Museum), and issued a portfolio of Stirling's drawings to the press.

After its completion in 1984, the building received widespread press coverage, with general acknowledgment of its significance as a Stirling design and a Harvard undertaking. Stirling employed an inventive design in an effort to let the museum peacefully co-exist with neighboring buildings in an area that he termed "an architectural zoo". Harvard published a 50-page book on the Sackler, with extensive color photos by Timothy Hursley, an interview with Stirling by Michael Dennis, a tribute to Arthur M. Sackler, and essays by Slive, Coolidge, and Rosenfield.

In spite of international critical acclaim upon its opening, there have been outspoken critics of the building; Martin Peretz even proposed its demolition (though his case was undermined by mis-attributing the building to another British architect, Norman Foster).

The Sackler building was originally intended to include a 18-foot (5.5 m) wide by 150-foot (46 m) long "connector" or bridge to the second floor of the original Fogg Museum building located on the other side of Broadway, a major Cambridge thoroughfare. The massive addition was planned to house two galleries, a lounge, and a completely-enclosed connection between the buildings, accessible to visitors and museum staff. The suspended structure was to include a large oculus window high above the middle of the street, at the level of the large square opening still visible on the front of the Sackler building.

The connector was postponed and never built, because of strong opposition from the Mid-Cambridge Neighborhood Association and local politicians. Eventually, an extensive renovation and expansion of the original Fogg Museum building would render the unbuilt connector proposal moot. In front of the entrance to the Sackler building, two monolithic concrete pillars still stand, which were originally intended to support the connector structure.

In 2013, the future use of the Sackler building was uncertain, as its collection had been relocated to the Renzo Piano expansion of the Fogg building.

In January 2019, after undergoing an 18-month renovation, the Sackler building was re-opened as an educational and research facility containing no significant public exhibition spaces. The building continues to house a sizable lecture hall at its basement level, which is primarily used for educational purposes. From its original opening in 1984, the building has encompassed the university's department of the History of Art and Architecture.

== See also ==
- National Register of Historic Places listings in Cambridge, Massachusetts
- List of university museums in the United States
