= Charles Saumarez Smith =

British art historian (born 1954)

Sir Charles Saumarez Smith
- Born: 28 May 1954 (age 71); Redlynch, Wiltshire, England
- Occupations: Art historian and museum director
- Spouse: Romilly Le Quesne Savage
- Children: 2
- Website: charlessaumarezsmith.com/blog

Sir Charles Robert Saumarez Smith CBE (born 28 May 1954) is a British cultural historian specialising in the history of art, design and architecture. He was the secretary and chief executive of the Royal Academy of Arts in London from 2007 until he stepped down in 2018. He was replaced by Axel Rüger, who took up the position in 2019.

He was previously director of the National Portrait Gallery from 1994 to 2002, and director of the National Gallery from 2002 to 2007. He has published various articles and books, including The Company of Artists:The Origins of the Royal Academy of Arts in London and was a judge at the World Architecture Festival 2014 in Singapore and the Young Masters 2014 awards in London.

Saumarez Smith was knighted in the 2018 Queen's Birthday Honours List.

== Biography ==
Charles Saumarez Smith was born in an old rectory in the Wiltshire village of Redlynch, near Salisbury. The son of William Hanbury Saumarez Smith, a former Indian civil servant and the great-grandson of the 19th-century Archbishop of Sydney William Saumarez Smith. His older brother was the London bookseller John Saumarez Smith.

He was educated at Marlborough College, where a Gainsborough portrait belonging to the school first awakened his interest in art. He then studied history and history of art at King's College, Cambridge, gaining a double first, and, following graduation, was awarded a Henry Fellowship to study at the Fogg Art Museum in Cambridge, Massachusetts. He studied for his doctorate under Michael Baxandall at the Warburg Institute, London, and was awarded a PhD in 1986 for his thesis entitled "Charles Howard, 3rd Earl of Carlisle and the architecture of Castle Howard". Meanwhile, he was appointed Christie's Research Fellow in the History of Applied Arts at Christ's College, Cambridge and taught part-time in the Department of Art History and Theory at the University of Essex.

In 1982, Saumarez Smith was appointed by Sir Roy Strong as an Assistant Keeper at the Victoria and Albert Museum, where he helped to establish the V&A/RCA MA Course in the History of Design and was a contributor to The New Museology, published in 1989. In 1990, his PhD thesis was published by Faber and Faber under the title The Building of Castle Howard and was awarded the Alice David Hitchcock medallion. In the same year, he was appointed as Head of Research at the Victoria and Albert Museum in London. In 1994, he published a book on 18th century interior design, before becoming director of the National Portrait Gallery. There, he and his staff more than doubled visitor figures by staging exhibitions of contemporary photographers, including Annie Leibovitz, Richard Avedon, Bruce Weber and the fashion photographer Mario Testino. He also presided over the building of an extension to the NPG in 2000, the Ondaatje Wing, designed by Sir Jeremy Dixon and Edward Jones. From 2001 to 2002, Saumarez Smith held the Slade Professorship at the University of Oxford, where he lectured on "The State of the Museum".

Saumarez Smith was a candidate to be Director at the V&A and the British Museum before becoming the director of the National Gallery in 2002. The main success of his directorship was the purchase of Raphael's Madonna of the Pinks in 2004 for £22 million, raised by a successful public appeal. However, few other major acquisitions were made by the National Gallery under Saumarez Smith due to the inflated prices commanded for Old Master paintings. He was a vocal critic of Tony Blair's government for giving too little money towards museum funding, and for not creating tax incentives for potential donors to museums.

2006 saw the opening of a new ground-floor entrance hall at the National Gallery, designed, like the Ondaatje Wing, by Dixon Jones architects. This project was already begun under Saumarez Smith's predecessor Neil MacGregor. In 2007, news broke of a power struggle between Peter Scott, head of the Gallery's board of trustees, and the director. At the same, time it became known that Saumarez Smith was applying for the newly created post of secretary and chief executive at the Royal Academy. He resigned from the National Gallery on 26 July 2007 and was succeeded by Martin Wyld, head conservator at the Gallery, as acting director, until Nicholas Penny was appointed permanent director in the spring of 2008.

In his time at the Royal Academy, Saumarez Smith was responsible for restoring the Keeper's House to its former glory and the development of plans for 6 Burlington Gardens, a Grade II*-listed building designed by Sir James Pennethorne immediately north of the Royal Academy, including the appointment of the architect Sir David Chipperfield. In the lead-up to the RA's 250th anniversary in 2018, Saumarez Smith oversaw annual fund-raising, revenue funding for the RA, and capital fund-raising for the capital project, which included a successful application to the Heritage Lottery Fund for a grant of £12.7 million. He presided over the exhibition programme including Anish Kapoor, Bronze, Sensing Spaces, Anselm Kiefer and the 2012 blockbuster David Hockney, the Bigger Picture which was the most visited exhibition of that year in the UK. In 2014 Saumarez Smith appointed White Cube exhibition curator and broadcaster Tim Marlow as the first Director of Artistic Programmes.

Saumarez Smith is a former visiting professor at Queen Mary, University of London, a Trustee of Charleston and the Royal Drawing School, an enthusiastic blogger, and in the past an occasional panellist on the BBC's Newsnight Review. He was appointed Commander of the Order of the British Empire (CBE) in the 2008 New Year Honours.

In 2019, Saumarez Smith became the first Professor of Architectural History at the Royal Academy.

== Bibliography ==
- The Art Museum in Modern Times. Thames & Hudson (2021)
- East London. Thames & Hudson (2017)
- New Annals of The Club. Pony Club (2014)
- The Company of Artists: The Origins of the Royal Academy of Arts in London. Bloomsbury / Modern Art Press (2012)
- The National Gallery: A Short History. Frances Lincoln (2009)
- The National Portrait Gallery. National Portrait Gallery Publications (1997)
- The Rise of Design: Design and Domestic Interior in Eighteenth-century England. Pimlico; New edition (2000)
- Eighteenth-Century Decoration. Design and the Domestic Interior in England. Weidenfeld & Nicolson (1993)
- The Building of Castle Howard. Faber & Faber (1990)

Saumarez Smith has contributed to biographies on Quentin Bell and Philip McCammon Core to the Oxford Dictionary of National Biography.

== Portraits ==
There are thirteen portraits of Saumarez Smith in the National Portrait Gallery Collection including two photographs by Mario Testino and an oil painting by Tom Phillips. A 2010 painting by Royal Academician Leonard McComb exists.

Academic offices
Preceded by Donald Preziosi	Slade Professor of Fine Art, University of Oxford; 2001–2002	Succeeded by Ernst van de Wetering
