= Craske =

Craske is a German surname. Notable people by that name include:

- Leonard Craske (1880–1950), English-American sculptor
- Margaret Craske (1892–1990), English ballet dancer
- Matthew Craske, art historian at Oxford Brookes University
- Michelle Craske (born 1959), Australian psychologist
- Thomas Craske (1901–1971), British bishop
