= Roger Stalley =

British art historian and professor (born 1945)

Professor Roger Stalley

Academic background
- Education: Worcester College, Oxford, The Courtauld Institute of Art

Academic work
- Discipline: History of art
- Sub-discipline: Gothic architecture, Romanesque architecture
- Institutions: Trinity College, Dublin

Roger Andrew Stalley (born 12 July 1945) is a scholar and teacher in medieval architecture and sculpture. His speciality is Early Gothic and Romanesque architecture and sculpture in England and Western Europe with a particular focus on Irish architecture and art. He has published numerous papers and books including Cistercian Monasteries of Ireland in 1987, for which he was awarded the Alice Davis Hitchcock Medallion in 1988 by the Society of Architectural Historians of Great Britain, and Early Medieval Architecture in 1999 for the Oxford History of Art series. He is noted for his innovative teaching practices for example, The Medieval Architecture Online Teaching Project, and is recognised in the 2021 publication Mapping New Territories in Art and Architectural Histories, Essays in Honour of Roger Stalley.

== Education and career ==
Professor Stalley spent his formative years in Coventry and Lincolnshire before graduating from Worcester College, Oxford with a degree in modern history, following which he read for a master's degree in the history of European art at the Courtauld Institute of Art, London. He graduated in 1969 and moved to Ireland, where he has remained, apart from a brief spell in North Carolina in 1985 undertaking a fellowship at the National Humanities Center. Now a Fellow Emeritus of Trinity College Dublin (appointed 2011), he commenced his time in Ireland as a lecturer in history of art at Trinity College in 1969, where he spent the majority of his career except for his time in North Carolina and as a Fellow at the Institute of Irish Studies at Queen's University Belfast between 1975 and 1976. Upon his retirement from university life in 2010, he had been the head of the School of Histories and Humanities at Trinity College for two years, having been awarded full professorship in 1990.

== Honours and appointments to public bodies ==
- Fellow of the Society of Antiquaries of London (Elected 1978)
- Fellow of the National Humanities Center, North Carolina 1985
- Member of the Royal Irish Academy (Elected 1993)
- Member of the Academia Europaea (Elected 2000)
- Honorary Fellow of the Royal Institute of the Architects of Ireland 2001 for services to Irish Architectural History

Stalley has provided his services to a number of public bodies, including acting as a member of the Irish Architectural Archive, on the governing board of the Dublin Institute of Technology (2002–2004), as a council member at the Society of Antiquaries of London (2001–2004) and as foreign advisor to the International Center of Medieval Art (New York) for three terms, the last being 2002–2005.

== Other information ==
Photographs contributed by Roger Stalley to the Conway Library are currently being digitised by the Courtauld Institute of Art, as part of the Courtauld Connects project. As well as contributing, Professor Stalley has also used photographs from the library in his work, e.g. an image of Gloucester Cathedral in his article 'Innovation in English Gothic Architecture: Risks, Impediments, and Opportunities for British Art Studies in June 2017.

== Selected publications ==
- Architecture and Sculpture in Ireland, 1150-1350, Dublin : Gill & Macmillan; London : Macmillan, 1971, ISBN 0717105547
- The Cistercian Monasteries of Ireland : an account of the history, art and architecture of the White Monks in Ireland from 1142 to 1540, New Haven; London : Yale University Press, 1987, ISBN 0300037376
- Irish High Crosses, Dublin : Eason & Son, 1991, ISBN 0900346957
- Ireland and Europe in the Middle Ages : selected essays on architecture and sculpture, London : Pindar, 1994, ISBN 0907132804
- Early Medieval Architecture, Oxford : Oxford University Press, 1999, ISBN 0192842234
- Irish Round Towers, Dublin : Country House, 2000, ISBN 1860591140
- Early Irish Sculpture and the Art of the High Crosses, New Haven; London : Yale University Press, 2020, ISBN 1913107094
