= Janet DeLaine =

Australian archaeologist

Janet DeLaine PhD, FSA
- Occupation: Archaeologist

Academic background
- Education: University of Adelaide
- Thesis: Design and Construction in Roman Imperial Architecture: the Baths of Caracalla in Rome (1992)
- Doctoral advisor: Frank Sear

Academic work
- Institutions: University of Oxford, University of Reading
- Main interests: Roman Archaeology, urbanism

Janet DeLaine is Emeritus Fellow at Wolfson College, Oxford and a Fellow of the Society of Antiquaries of London. She is a Roman archaeologist whose research has focused on urban environments, with a particular focus on bath complexes, urban development and the building industry in the Roman world.

== Career ==
DeLaine trained in Civil Engineering and then Classics, receiving her BA (hons) and PhD the University of Adelaide. Her doctoral thesis was on Design and Construction in Roman Imperial Architecture: the Baths of Caracalla in Rome. Her subsequent book The Baths of Caracalla in Rome: a Study in the Design, Construction and Economics of Large-scale Building Projects in Imperial Rome, Journal of Roman Archaeology, Supplement 25 (Portsmouth R.I. 1997) won the Archaeological Institute of America's James R. Wiseman Award for the most significant work in archaeology in 1998.

She held the position of lecturer and then senior lecturer in archaeology at the University of Reading, in the Department of Archaeology, before becoming a lecturer at the Institute of Archaeology at the University of Oxford in 2005.

In 1999 she was elected a Fellow to the Society of Antiquities of London. Her international standing was recognized with her election as Corresponding Member of the Archaeological Institute of America in 2010, and in 2014 she held the Japan Society for the Promotion of Science Senior Research Fellowship at Kyushu University, in the Department of Architecture and Urban Design. DeLaine has also been a Rome Scholar (1986-7) and Hugh Last Fellow (1999–2000) at the British School at Rome.

DeLaine has also lent her expertise to a number of TV documentaries.

== Selected publications ==
=== Books ===
- Janet DeLaine: Roman Architecture (Oxford History of Art) (Oxford 2023).
- Janet DeLaine, Stefano Camporeale, Antonio Pizzo (eds.) Arqueología de la construcción 5, Man-made materials, engineering and infrastructure: proceedings of the 5th International Workshop on the archaeology of Roman construction, Oxford, April 11–12, 2015 (Madrid 2016) ISBN 978-84-00-10142-8
- Janet DeLaine and D.E. Johnston (eds). Roman Baths and Bathing. Proceedings of the First International Conference on Roman Baths, Vol. 1, Bathing and Society; Vol. 2 Design and Construction, Journal of Roman Archaeology Supplement 37 (Portsmouth RI 1999). ISBN 9781887829373
- Janet DeLaine. The Baths of Caracalla in Rome: a study in the design, construction and economics of large-scale building projects in imperial Rome, Journal of Roman Archaeology, Supplement 25 (Portsmouth R.I. 1997). ISBN 9781887829250

=== Book chapters and journal articles ===
- Janet DeLaine. 'Gardens in baths and palaestras', in Gardens of the Roman Empire, ed. by Wihelmina F. Jashemski, Kathryn L. Gleason (Cambridge 2018), pp. 165–184. ISBN 978-0-521-82161-2
- Janet DeLaine. 'Baths and bathing in late antique Ostia', Common ground : archaeology, art, science, and humanities: proceedings of the XVIth International congress of classical archaeology, Boston, August 23–26, 2003, ed. by Carol C. Mattusch, Alice A. Donohue and Amy Brauer (Oxford 2006), pp. 338–343
- Janet DeLaine. 'The commercial landscape of Ostia', in Roman working lives and urban living, ed. by Ardle Mac Mahon and Jennifer Price (Oakville (Conn.) 2005), pp. 29–47.
- Janet DeLaine. 'Designing for a market: medianum apartments at Ostia', Journal of Roman Archaeology 17.1 (2004), pp. 146–176.
