= Master of the Legend of Saint Ursula =

Master of the Legend of Saint Ursula may refer to:

- Master of the Legend of Saint Ursula (Bruges)
- Master of the Legend of Saint Ursula (Cologne)
