= Matthew Craske =

Art historian

- Education: University College, London
- Occupation: Art historian
- Employer: Oxford Brookes University

Matthew Craske is an art historian at Oxford Brookes University. He is art adviser to the Church of England Diocese of Oxford. He received his PhD in 1992 from University College, London for a thesis titled, "The London trade in monumental sculpture and the imagery of the family in monumental art, 1720-1760".

== Selected publications ==
- Art in Europe 1700-1830: A history of the visual arts in an era of unprecedented urban growth. Oxford University Press, Oxford, 1997. ISBN 978-0192842466
- William Hogarth. Tate Publishing, London, 2000. ISBN 1854373323
- Pantheons: Transformations of a monumental idea. Ashgate, Aldershot, 2004. (Edited with Richard Wrigley) ISBN 978-0754608080
- The silent rhetoric of the body: A history of monumental sculpture and commemorative art in England, 1720-70. Yale University Press, New Haven, 2008. ISBN 978-0300135411
