= Donald Preziosi =

American art historian (born 1941)

Donald Anthony Preziosi (born January 12, 1941) is an American art historian. He is Emeritus Professor of Art History at the University of California, Los Angeles. In August 2007, he was appointed the MacGeorge Fellow at the University of Melbourne. He also served as president of the Semiotic Society of America (1985).

In his writing he combines disciplines as diverse as intellectual history, critical theory and museology. His 1998 book The Art of Art History: A Critical Anthology is considered 'the most widely used English-language introduction to art history'.

At UCLA, Professor Preziosi developed the art history critical theory program and the UCLA museum studies program. At Oxford, he held the Slade Professorship of Fine Arts in 2001, where he delivered a series of lectures entitled Seeing Through Art History.

== Education ==
Preziosi received his bachelor's degree from Fairfield University and his master's degree in Linguistics and a Ph.D. in art history from Harvard University.

== Bibliography ==
- LABRYS (Charlton Press, New Haven), 1970)
- Architecture, Language, and Meaning (Mouton, The Hague), 1979
- The Semiotics of the Built Environment (Indiana Univ Press, Bloomington & London), 1979
- Minoan Architectural Design (Mouton, Berlin), 1983
- Rethinking Art History: Meditations on a Coy Science (Yale University Press, New Haven & London), 1989
- The Ottoman City and Its Parts: Urban Structure & Social Order, Irene Bierman, Rifa'at Ali Abou-El-Haj & Donald Preziosi, eds.1992; [Co-Editor and two introductory essays]
- The Art of Art History: A Critical Anthology (edited, with two essays and 10 introductory essays; Oxford University Press, Oxford & New York, 1998)
- Aegean Art and Architecture (with Louise Hitchcock; Oxford University Press, Oxford & New York, 1999)
- Brain of the Earth's Body: Museums & the Fabrication of Modernity (Minnesota University Press, Minneapolis & London, 1999)
- In the Aftermath of Art: Ethics, Aesthetics, and Politics (Routledge, 2005) – essays on visual culture and art history, 1988-2003, with a Critical Commentary by Johanne Lamoureux

Academic offices
Preceded by Robert Hewison	Slade Professor of Fine Art, Oxford University; 2000–2001	Succeeded by Charles Saumarez Smith
