= Women's Caucus for Art =

Non-profit organization based in New York City

- Founded: 1972
- Type: Non-profit
- Purpose: networking organization for women in the arts
- Location: New York, New York
- Website: www.nationalwca.org

The Women's Caucus for Art (WCA), founded in 1972, is a non-profit organization based in New York City, which supports women artists, art historians, students, educators, and museum professionals. The WCA holds exhibitions and conferences to promote women artists and their works and recognizes the talents of artists through their annual Lifetime Achievement Award. Since 1975 it has been a United Nations-affiliated non-governmental organization (NGO), which has broadened its influence beyond the United States. Within the WCA are several special interest causes including the Women of Color caucus, Eco-Art Caucus, Jewish Women Artist Network, International Caucus and the Young Women's Caucus. The founding of the WCA is seen as a "great stride" in the feminist art movement.

== Overview ==
The Women's Caucus for Art membership includes artists, students, educators, art historians, and professionals from museums and galleries. The organization holds conferences, produces exhibitions, conducts research and issues awards.

Along with the founding of the National Museum of Women in the Arts, its creation is seen as one of the "great strides [that] have been made in developing an institutional infrastructure for women's art and art history since the 1970s."

== History ==
=== Background ===
Within the broader feminist movement of the late 1960s and early 1970s, a feminist art movement began to contest women's under-representation in professional art organizations, art exhibitions and art history textbooks. The movement "was a major watershed in women's history and the history of art." Its slogan was "the personal is political."

In 1969, Women Artists in Revolution (WAR) formed in response to the inclusion of “only 8 women among the 143 artists shown” at the Whitney Museum’s 1969 Annual. WAR “demanded that the museum change its policies to include more women artists.” In 1971, Linda Nochlin’s "Why Have There Been No Great Women Artists?" and Judy Chicago and Miriam Schapiro started the Feminist Art Program at Cal Arts, which provided a new arts education for women based on mentorship, training in tools, research about women artists, consciousness-raising, and role-playing. The following year, "Paula Harper and twenty-one participants in the Feminist Art Program" conceived of "a landmark collaborative installation staged in an empty house in Los Angeles" and called Womanhouse

=== College Art Association Women's Caucus ===
At its annual conference in San Francisco, women within the College Art Association formed a women's caucus on 28 January 1972, electing Ann Sutherland Harris as the first president (1972-1974). However, tensions developed between this group and the CAA board, and in November 1973 the CAA executive asked "the Women's Caucus, which is not officially affiliated with the CAA, to drop the use of the phrase 'of the CAA' from its name."

=== Women's Caucus for Art founded ===
In 1974 Mary Garrard, president of the caucus from 1974 to 1976, oversaw the formation of the Women's Caucus for Art (WCA) as an independent non-profit organization. Arlene Raven, who, with Judy Chicago and Sheila Levrant de Bretteville, founded the Feminist Studio Workshop of Women's Building, was also part of WCA's roots as was Eleanor Dickenson. The WCA grew, establishing regional chapters and publishing research on women's art. Membership broadened from predominantly art historians to a majority of women artists, and the third president, Judith K. Brodsky, was herself an artist rather than art historian.

In 1977 the Coalition of Women's Art Organizations (CWAO) was formed as a political arm of the WCA.

== Organizational structure ==
The Women's Caucus for Art is a national member organization with 23 regional chapters located throughout the United States. The headquarters, in New York City, is an umbrella organization governed by a national board of directors consisting of an executive committee (president, president elect, treasurer/secretary, vice president/chair of national exhibitions, past president/chair of legacy, vice president of chapter relations, vice president for organizational outreach, vice president for development and vice president of special events), regional vice presidents, standing committee chairs, directors (including chairs of internal caucuses)) and board-appointed advisors. The National President is voted in by the membership for two-year terms. Half of the board is nominated by the incoming president and approved by the board, and the other half is voted in by chapter representatives.

Many of the regional chapters are organized as separate 501(c)3 non profit organizations. The Northeast Region consists of WCA New Hampshire, Central Mass WCA, WCA New York, and Philadelphia WCA. The Southeast Region consists of Greater Washington DC WCA, WCA Georgia, WCA Alabama, WCA Florida, and WCA Louisiana. The Midwest Region consists of Chicago WCA, WCA Michigan, WCA Minnesota, WCA Indiana, WCA Nebraska, and St. Louis Missouri WCA. The Southwest Region consists of WCA Colorado and Texas WCA. The Pacific Region consists of WCA Northern California, WCA Peninsula, WCA Monterey Bay, Silicon Valley WCA, Southern California WCA and Oregon WCA.

== Special-interest caucuses ==
Within the WCA are several special interest causes including the Women of Color caucus, Eco-Art Caucus, Jewish Women Artist Network, International Caucus and the Young Women's Caucus.

After being appointed to Vice President of Minority Affairs by the President Ofelia Garcia in 1986, artist and activist Faith Ringgold proposed the formation of a women of color caucus. It was within this context that "Coast to Coast", an arts organization for women of color, was created.

The Jewish Women Artist Network (JWAN) was founded by Francia Tobacman. From 2006 to 2012 it organized national conferences of Jewish related themes. The International Caucus maintains WCA's involvement with the United Nations, develops art exhibitions related to the UN Goals, develops collaborative projects with other global organizations, collects data about WCA's art and activism projects, and shares this information with the larger WCA membership. The Young Women's Caucus supports women artists of who are college students, returning students and young professionals seeking to create a career in art. It provides networking resources to established women artists within the broader organization.

== National presidents ==
- 1972–1974: Ann Sutherland Harris
- 1974–1976: Mary D. Garrard
- 1976–1978: Judith K. Brodsky
- 1978–1980: Lee Ann Miller
- 1980–1982: Susan DeRenne Coerr
- 1982–1984: Muriel Magenta
- 1984–1986: Ofelia Garcia
- 1986–1988: Annie Shaver-Crandell
- 1988–1990: Christine Havice
- 1990: Carol Heifetz Neiman
- 1990–1992: Iona Deering
- 1992–1994: Jean Towgood
- 1994–1996: Helen Klebesadel
- 1996–1998: Imna Arroyo
- 1998: Transition Leadership Committee (Magi Amma, Catherine Carilli, Margaret Lutze, and Gail Tremblay)
- 1999: Gail Tremblay
- 2000–2002: Magi Amma
- 2002–2004: Noreen Dean Dresser
- 2004–2006: Dena Muller
- 2006–2008: Jennifer Colby
- 2008–2010: Marilyn J. Hayes
- 2010–2012: Janice Nesser-Chu
- 2012–2014: Priscilla Otani
- 2014–2016: Brenda Oelbaum
- 2016–2018: Susan M. King
- 2018–2020: Margo Hobbs
- 2020–present: Donna Jackson

== Lifetime Achievement Awards ==
In 1979 the WCA created the National Lifetime Achievement Awards. The goal was to acknowledge the work of notable women in the arts and stimulate the growth of opportunities within the arts. An important annual function, honorees are selected by a group of notable WCA scholars and artists. A few honorees include painter Georgia O'Keeffe, painter Alice Neel, art historian Lucy R. Lippard, sculptor and painter Selma Burke, and women's museum founder Wilhelmina Holladay.

=== Awardees ===
- 1979: Isabel Bishop, Selma Burke, Alice Neel, Louise Nevelson, Georgia O'Keeffe
- 1980: Anni Albers, Louise Bourgeois, Caroline Durieux, Ida Kohlmeyer, Lee Krasner
- 1980 Alternate Awards: Bella Abzug, Sonia Johnson, Sister Theresa Kane, Grace Paley, Rosa Parks, Gloria Steinem
- 1981: Ruth Bernhard, Adelyn Breeskin, Elizabeth Catlett, Sari Dienes, Claire Falkenstein, Helen Lundeberg
- 1982: Bernice Abbot, Elsie Driggs, Elizabeth Gilmore Holt, Katherine Kuh, Charmion von Wiegand, Claire Zeisler
- 1983: Edna Andrade, Dorothy Dehner, Lotte Jacobi, Ellen Johnson, Stella Kramrisch, Leonore Tawney, Pecolia Warner
- 1984/1985: Minna Citron, Clyde Connell, Eleanor Raymond, Joyce Treiman, June Wayne, Rachel Wischnitzer
- 1986: Nell Blaine, Leonora Carrington, Sue Fuller, Lois Mailou Jones, Dorothy Miller, Barbara Morgan
- 1987: Grace Hartigan, Agnes Mongan, Maud Morgan, Honoré Sharrer, Elizabeth Talford Scott, Beatrice Wood; President's Award: Patricia Hills
- 1988: Margaret Burroughs, Dorothy Hood, Miriam Schapiro, Edith Standen, Jane Teller
- 1989: Bernarda Bryson Shahn, Margret Craver, Clare Leighton, Betye Saar, Samella Sanders Lewis
- 1990: Ilse Bing, Elizabeth Layton, Helen Serger, May Stevens, Pablita Velarde
- 1991: Theresa Bernstein, Mildred Constantine, Otellie Loloma, Miné Okubo, Delilah Pierce
- 1992: Vera Berdich, Paula Gerard, Lucy Lewis, Louise Noun, Margaret Tafoya, Anna Tate
- 1993: Ruth Asawa, Shifra M. Goldman, Nancy Graves, Gwen Knight, Agueda Salazar Martinez, Emily Waheneka
- 1994: Mary Adams, Maria Enriquez de Allen, Beverly Pepper, Faith Ringgold, Rachel Rosenthal, Charlotte Streifer Rubinstein
- 1995: Irene Clark, Jacqueline Clipsham, Alessandra Comini, Jean Lacy, Amalia Mesa-Bains, Celia Alvarez Muñoz
- 1996: Bernice Bing, Alicia Craig Faxon, Elsa Honig Fine, Howardena Pindell, Marianna Pineda, Kay WalkingStick
- 1997: Jo Hanson, Sadie Krauss Kriebel, Jaune Quick-to-See Smith, Moira Roth, Kay Sekimachi; President's Award: Tee Corinne, Ofelia Garcia
- 1999: Judy Baca, Judy Chicago, Linda Frye Burnham, Evangeline J. Montgomery, Arlene Raven, Barbara T. Smith
- 2001: Joyce Aiken, Marie Johnson Calloway, Dorothy Gillespie, Thalia Gouma-Peterson, Wilhemina Holladay, Ellen Lanyon, Ruth Waddy
- 2002: Camille Billops, Judith K. Brodsky, Muriel Magenta, Linda Nochlin, Marilyn J. Stokstad; President's Award: Barbara Wolanin
- 2003: Eleanor Dickinson, Suzi Gablik, Grace Glueck, Ronne Hartfield, Eleanor Munro, Nancy Spero
- 2004: Emma Amos, Jo Baer, Michi Itami, Helen Levitt, Yvonne Rainer; President's Awards: Elizabeth A. Sackler, Tara Donovan
- 2005: Betty Blayton-Taylor, Rosalynn Carter, Mary D. Garrard, Agnes Martin, Yoko Ono, Ann Sutherland Harris; President's Award: Andrea Barnwell
- 2006: Eleanor Antin, Marisol Escobar, Elinor Gadon, Yayoi Kusama; President's Award: Maura Reilly
- 2007 (co-hosted with the College Art Association Committee on Women in the Arts): WCA Recipients: Barbara Chase-Riboud, Wanda Corn, Buffie Johnson, Lucy R. Lippard, Elizabeth Murray; President'sAward: Connie Butler; CWA Award Recipients: Ferris Olin, Judith K. Brodsky
- 2008: Ida Applebroog, Joanna Frueh, Nancy Grossman, Leslie King-Hammond, Yolanda López, Lowery Stokes Sims; President's Award: Santa Barraza, Joan Davidow, Tey Marianna Nunn
- 2009: Maren Hassinger, Ester Hernandez, Joyce Kozloff, Margo Machida, Ruth Weisberg; President's Award: Catherine Opie, Susan Fisher Sterling
- 2010: Tritobia Hayes Benjamin, Mary Jane Jacob, Senga Nengudi, Joyce J. Scott, Spiderwoman Theater (Lisa Mayo, Gloria Miguel, Muriel Miguel); President's Award: Juana Guzman, Karen Reimer
- 2011: Beverly Buchanan, Diane Burko, Ofelia Garcia, Joan Marter, Carolee Schneemann, Sylvia Sleigh; President's Award for Art & Activism: Maria Torres
- 2012: Whitney Chadwick, Suzanne Lacy, Ferris Olin, Bernice Steinbaum, Trinh T. Minh-ha; President's Award for Art & Activism: Karen Mary Davalos, Cathy Salser
- 2013: Tina Dunkley, Artis Lane, Susana Torruella Leval, Joan Semmel; President's Award for Art & Activism: Leanne Stella
- 2014: Phyllis Bramson, Harmony Hammond, Adrian Piper, Faith Wilding; President's Award for Art & Activism: Hye-Seong Tak Lee, Janice Nesser-Chu
- 2015: Sue Coe, Kiki Smith, Martha Wilson; President's Award for Art & Activism: Petra Kuppers
- 2016: Tomie Arai, Helène Aylon, Sheila Levrant de Bretteville, Juana Guzman; President's Award for Art & Activism: Stephanie Sherman
- 2017: Audrey Flack, Mary Schmidt Campbell, Charlene Teters, Martha Rosler; President's Award for Art & Activism: Kat Griefen
- 2018: Lee Bontecou, Lynn Hershman Leeson, Gloria Orenstein, Renée Stout; President's Award for Art & Activism: Kathy Gallegos and Amelia Jones
- 2019: Olga de Amaral, Mary Beth Edelson, Gladys Barker Grauer, Mira Schor; President's Award for Art & Activism: L. J. Roberts and Aruna S'Souza
- 2020: Joyce Fernandes, Michiko Itatani, Alison Saar, Judith Stein; President's Award for Art & Activism: Rose B. Simpson
- 2022: Lynda Benglis, Beate Minkovski, Gladys Nilsson, Lorraine O'Grady, Linda Vallejo; President’s Award for Art & Activism: Sabrina Nelson; WCA Emerging Artist Award: Ashley January

== Exhibitions ==
=== National exhibitions ===
- 1996, Beijing and Beyond, as part of "One Year After Beijing" event in the Public Lobby of the United Nations, September 9, 1996
- 1996, Transforming Tradition: Women's Caucus for Art National Juried Exhibition, Bromfield Gallery, and Chinese Culture Institute, Boston, Massachusetts, juried by Susan Fisher of National Museum of Women in the Arts, Eugenie Tsai of the Whitney Museum at Champion, and Boston artist Magdelena Campos Pons
- 1997, Beijing and Beyond: Women Artists Respond to the World Conference on Women, traveled to Minneapolis Women's Consortium Building, Minnesota, the HUB Formal Gallery of Portland State University, Oregon, the University of Texas at Dallas, Mills College, California and the ARC Gallery, Chicago
- 2010, From the Center, Juror: Lucy Lippard, Venue: WomanMade Gallery, Chicago, Dates: January 22 – February 25
- 2011- Sanctuaries in Time, The Kraft Center for Jewish Life at Columbia/Barnard University, New York, NY, JWAN show, Juror: Maya Balakirsky Katz of Touro College, New York, Co-Directors: Janice Nesser-Chu & Brenda Oelbaum, January 18-March 1, 2011. Co- Chairs: Fay Grajower, Simone Soltan
- 2011, Reversing the Gaze: Man as Object, Organized by Brenda Oelbaum, Priscilla Otani, Karen Gutfreund, and Tanya Augsburg, SOMArts, Dates: November 4–30, Kinsey Institute, Dates April 13-June 29, 2012
- 2011, Hidden Cities, Juror: Lisa Philips, Director of the New Museum, New York City, Venue: New Century Artist Gallery, NYC, Director: Karen Gutfreund, Dates: February 1 – February 12
- 2012 Song of the Land, Hebrew Union College- Institute of Religion – Los Angeles, CA JWAN show, Juror: Ruth Weisberg, Former Dean, Roski School of Fine Arts, University of California, Co-Chairs: Fay Grajower, Simone Soltan
- 2012 Petroleum Paradox: For Better or For Worse?, Juror: Eleanor Heartney, Venue: Denise Bibro Fine Art, Dates: May 24 – June 23
- 2012, Momentum: Celebrating 40 Years of WCA Women Artists, Juror: Rita Gonzales, Venue: Gallery 825, Los Angeles, Director: Karen Gutfreund, Dates: February 17 to March 2
- 2013, Bound, Juror: Cora Rosevear, Director: Karen Gutfreund, Venue: Phoenix Gallery, New York City, Dates: Jan 30 - Feb 23.
- 2014, Equilibrium, Art for a Changing World, Jurors: Beate Minkovski and Mary Stoppert, Venue: Woman Made Gallery, Chicago, Dates: January 17 to February 27
- 2015, National Juried Exhibition, with four exhibitions presented by the Women’s Caucus for Art, Jurors: Petra Kuppers, Karen Gutfreund and Fay Grawjower, Venue: Westbeth Center for the Arts, New York, Dates: February 7 to 22.

=== International exhibitions ===
- 2012, Woman + Body, collaboration with Korean artists, Exhibition Director: Hye-Seong Tak Lee, Exhibition Co-Director: Sherri Cornett, Juror for US works: Tanya Augsburg, Venues/Dates: Kepco Art Center Gallery, Seoul, South Korea, October 13–19, MediaCube 338, Gwangju, South Korea, October 23-November 6

== United Nations affiliation ==
The Women's Caucus for Art has been a United Nations-affiliated NGO (non-governmental agency) since 1975. An NGO is "any non-profit, voluntary citizens' group which is organized on a local, national or international level. Task-oriented and driven by people with a common interest, NGOs perform a variety of service and humanitarian functions, bring citizen concerns to Governments, advocate and monitor policies and encourage political participation through provision of information." As the liaison group between WCA and the United Nations, WCA's International Caucus members have participated in, and created exhibitions, side events at UN DPI/NGO conferences in support of UN goals and priorities and participated in UN Commission on the Status of Women conferences.

In the fall of 1995, the UN-sponsored Fourth World International Conference on Women was held in China. "The purpose of the conference was to discuss the advancement and involvement of women in world affairs." The WCA sent 100 women artists, art educators and art activists to attend conferences and workshops. "As a reaction to this expedition, the artists were asked to create works depicting their experiences. From this was born the exhibit Beijing and Beyond: Women Artists Respond To The World Conference On Women."

== See also ==
- Ann Rowles, Board member 2004–present
- College Art Association
- Women's Caucus for Art Lifetime Achievement Award
