= Women's Caucus for Art Lifetime Achievement Award =

Women artists award

- Description: Honors outstanding contributions by women to the visual arts
- Country: United States
- Presented by: Women's Caucus for Art (WCA)
- Website: https://nationalwca.org/awards/

The Women's Caucus for Art Lifetime Achievement Award was established under the presidency of Lee Ann Miller (1978–80). Joan Mondale, artist and wife of vice-president Walter Mondale, helped to secure approval for a national award honoring women's achievements in the arts, and Jimmy Carter presided over the first Women's Caucus for Art award ceremony in the Oval Office in 1979. The WCA Honor Awards Ceremony has occurred annually most years since then.

== Recipients ==
Year	Venue	Recipients of WCA Honors Lifetime Achievement Award
1979	Washington D. C.	Isabel Bishop, Selma Burke, Alice Neel, Louise Nevelson, Georgia O'Keeffe (in absentia)
1980	New Orleans	Anni Albers, Louise Bourgeois, Caroline Durieux, Ida Kohlmeyer, Lee Krasner
1980 Alternate Awards	Washington D. C.	Bella Abzug, Sonia Johnson, Sister Theresa Kane, Rosa Parks, Gloria Steinem, Grace Paley
1981	San Francisco	Ruth Bernhard, Adelyn Breeskin, Elizabeth Catlett, Sari Dienes, Claire Falkenstein, Helen Lundeberg
1982	New York City	Bernice Abbott, Elsie Driggs, Elizabeth Gilmore Holt, Katharine Kuh, Charmion von Wiegand, Claire Zeisler
1983	Philadelphia	Edna Andrade, Dorothy Dehner, Lotte Jacobi, Ellen Johnson, Stella Kramrisch, Lenore Tawney, Pecolia Warner
1985	Los Angeles	Minna Citron, Clyde Connell, Eleanor Raymond, Joyce Treiman, June Wayne, Rachel Wischnitzer
1986	New York City	Nell Blaine, Leonora Carrington, Sue Fuller, Lois Mailou Jones, Dorothy Miller, Barbara Morgan
1987	Boston	Grace Hartigan, Agnes Mongan, Maud Morgan, Honoré Sharrer, Elizabeth Talford Scott, Beatrice Wood, Patricia Hills (President's Award)
1988	Houston	Margaret Burroughs, Dorothy Hood, Miriam Schapiro, Edith Standen, Jane Teller
1989	San Francisco	Bernarda Bryson Shahn, Margret Craver, Clare Leighton, Betye Saar, Samella Sanders Lewis
1990	New York City	Ilse Bing, Elizabeth Layton, Helen Serger, May Stevens, Pablita Velarde
1991	Washington DC	Theresa Bernstein, Mildred Constantine, Otellie Loloma, Miné Okubo, Delilah Pierce
1992	Chicago	Vera Berdich, Paula Gerard, Lucy Lewis, Louise Noun, Margaret Tafoya, Anna Tate
1993	Seattle	Ruth Asawa, Shifra Goldman, Nancy Graves, Gwen Knight, Agueda Salazar Martinez, Emily Waheneka
1994	New York City	Mary Adams, Maria Enriquez de Allen, Beverly Pepper, Faith Ringgold, Rachel Rosenthal, Charlotte Streifer Rubinstein
1995	San Antonio	Irene Clark, Jacqueline Clipsham, Alessandra Comini, Jean Lacy, Amalia Mesa-Bains, Celia Álvarez Muñoz
1996	Boston	Bernice Bing, Alicia Craig Faxon, Elsa Honig Fine, Howardena Pindell, Marianna Pineda, Kay WalkingStick
1997	Philadelphia	Jo Hanson, Sadie Krauss Kriebel, Jaune Quick-To-See Smith, Moira Roth, Kay Sekimachi, Tee Corinne (President's Award), Ofelia Garcia (President's Award)
1999	Los Angeles	Judy Baca, Judy Chicago, Linda Frye Burnham, Evangeline J. Montgomery, Arlene Raven, Barbara T. Smith
2001	Chicago	Joyce Aiken, Marie Johnson Calloway, Dorothy Gillespie, Thalia Gouma-Peterson, Wilhelmina Holladay, Ellen Lanyon, Ruth G. Waddy
2002	Philadelphia	Camille Billops, Judith K. Brodsky, Muriel Magenta, Linda Nochlin, Marilyn Stokstad, Barbara Wolanin (President's Award)
2003	New York City	Eleanor Dickinson, Suzi Gablik, Grace Glueck, Ronne Hartfield, Eleanor Munro, Nancy Spero
2004	Seattle	Emma Amos, Jo Baer, Michi Itami, Helen Levitt, Yvonne Rainer, Elizabeth A. Sackler (President's Award), Tara Donovan (President's Award)
2005	Atlanta	Betty Blayton-Taylor, Rosalynn Carter, Mary D. Garrard, Agnes Martin, Yoko Ono, Ann Sutherland Harris, Andrea Barnwell Brownlee (President's Award)
2006	Boston	Eleanor Antin, Marisol Escobar, Elinor Gadon, Yayoi Kusama, Maura Reilly (President's Award)
2007	New York City	Barbara Chase-Riboud, Wanda Corn, Buffie Johnson, Lucy R. Lippard, Elizabeth Murray, (President's Award) Connie Butler
2008	Dallas	Ida Applebroog, Joanna Frueh, Nancy Grossman, Leslie King-Hammond, Yolanda López, Lowery Stokes Sims, (President's Awards ),Santa Barraza, Joan Davidow, and Tey Marianna Nunn
2009	Los Angeles,	Maren Hassinger, Ester Hernandez, Joyce Kozloff, Margo Machida, Ruth Weisberg, Catherine Opie (President's Award), Susan Fisher Sterling (President's Award)
2010	Chicago	Tritobia Hayes Benjamin, Mary Jane Jacob, Senga Nengudi, Joyce J. Scott, Spiderwoman Theater (Lisa Mayo, Gloria Miguel, Muriel Miguel), Juana Guzman (President's Award), Karen Reimer (President's Award)
2011	New York	Beverly Buchanan, Diane Burko, Ofelia Garcia, Joan Marter, Carolee Schneemann, Sylvia Sleigh, Maria Torres (President's Award for Art & Activism)
2012	Los Angeles	Whitney Chadwick, Suzanne Lacy, Ferris Olin, Bernice Steinbaum, Trinh T. Minh-ha, Karen Mary Davalos (President's Award for Art & Activism), Cathy Salser (President's Award for Art & Activism) Lynn Hershman Leeson ( WCA Media Award )
2013	New York City	Tina Dunkley, Artis Lane, Susana Torruella Leval, Joan Semmel, Leanne Stella (President's Award for Art & Activism)
2014	Chicago	Phyllis Bramson, Harmony Hammond, Adrian Piper, Faith Wilding, Hye-Seong Tak Lee (President's Award for Art & Activism), Janice Nesser-Chu (President's Award for Art & Activism)
2015	New York	Sue Coe, Kiki Smith, Martha Wilson, (President's Award for Art & Activism) Petra Kuppers
2016	Washington, DC	Tommi Arai, Helène Aylon, Sheila Levrant de Bretteville, Juana Guzman, (President's Award for Art & Activism) Stephanie Sherman
2017	New York	Audrey Flack, Mary Schmidt Campbell, Charlene Teters, Martha Rosler, (President's Award for Art and Activism) Kat Griefen
2018	Los Angeles	Lee Bontecou, Lynn Hershman Leeson, Gloria Orenstein, Renee Stout, (President's Award for Art & Activism) Kathy Gallegos and Amelia Jones
2019	Los Angeles	Olga de Amaral, Mary Beth Edelson, Gladys Barker Grauer, Mira Schor, (President's Award for Art & Activism) L.J. Roberts and Aruna D'Souza
2020	Chicago	Joyce Fernandes, Michiko Itatani, Judy Onofrio, Alison Saar, Judith Stein, (President's Award for Art & Activism) Rose B. Simpson
2022	Chicago	Lynda Benglis, Beate Minkovski, Gladys Nilsson, Lorraine O’Grady, Linda Vallejo, (President's Award for Art & Activism) Sabrina Nelson, (Emerging Artists Award) Ashley January

== See also ==
- List of media awards honoring women
