= Eleanor Tufts =

American art historian

Eleanor May Tufts (February 1, 1927 – December 2, 1991) was an American art historian, feminist and professor of art history at Southern Methodist University in Dallas, Texas.

Her work as an author, historian and lecturer was key to the opening of the National Museum for Women in the Arts in 1974. The collection gathers her papers on biographical data, correspondence, professional material, essays, articles, student papers, and manuscripts covering the years between 1927 and 1991, with the bulk of the materials from 1970 to 1988.

== Early and personal life ==
Tufts was born in Exeter, New Hampshire in 1927 to a businessman and a schoolteacher. She graduated from Simmons College with a B.S. in Spanish in 1949, after which she worked as an executive secretary at Boston University before returning to school for her master's. She earned her master's degree in Art History from Radcliffe College in 1957. She later earned a Ph.D. from the Institute of Fine Arts at New York University.

In 1974 Tufts befriended Texas art historian Alessandra Comini; they developed a shared feminist approach toward art and made a shared home together in Dallas as life partners. They spent summers tracking down works by women artists, for their books to raise curatorial awareness of important works by women that had been relegated in storage.

== Career ==
After earning her master's degree in 1957, the Council on International Educational Exchange in New York City hired her as their director of program development. She then served as associate director of World University Service, New York.

In 1964, she obtained her first faculty position, assistant professor of art history at the University of Bridgeport in Connecticut. In 1966, she became associate professor of art history at Southern Connecticut State University in New Haven.

Tufts received her Ph.D. from New York University's Institute of Fine Arts in 1971. She defended her dissertation on Spanish artist Luis Egidio Meléndez under the direction of José Lopez-Rey. After receiving her doctorate, she was appointed full professor of art history and chair of the Division of Art at Southern Methodist University in Dallas, Texas.

In 1985, she helped organized a Meléndez exhibition at the National Academy of Design in New York City. In 1987 the first director of the National Museum of Women in the Arts, Anne-Imelda Radice, asked Tufts to curate the traveling exhibition, "American Women Artists, 1830–1930", a show that received extensive and controversial coverage.

Tufts served as a member of the editorial board of the Woman's Art Journal until the end of her life, and was replaced by Comini after she died.

Tufts died of ovarian cancer on December 2, 1991 at Presbyterian Hospital of Dallas at the age of 64.

== Publications ==
- Our Hidden Heritage: Five Centuries of Women Artists (1974)
- Luis Melendez, 18th-Century Master of the Spanish Still Life (1985)
- American Women Artists, 1830-1930, with introductory essays by Gail Levin, Alessandra Comini and Wanda M. Corn (1987)

== See also ==
- Women in the art history field
