= Coerr (surname) =

Coerr is a surname. Notable people with the surname include:

- Eleanor Coerr (1922–2010), Canadian-born American writer
- Susan DeRenne Coerr (1939–2007), American artist and educator
- Wymberley D. Coerr (died 1996), American politician and diplomat
