= Steinbaum =

Steinbaum is a surname. Notable people with the name include:

- Bernice Steinbaum, American gallerist and curator
- Suzanne Steinbaum, American cardiologist and author
