= Joan Davidow =

American contemporary art expert

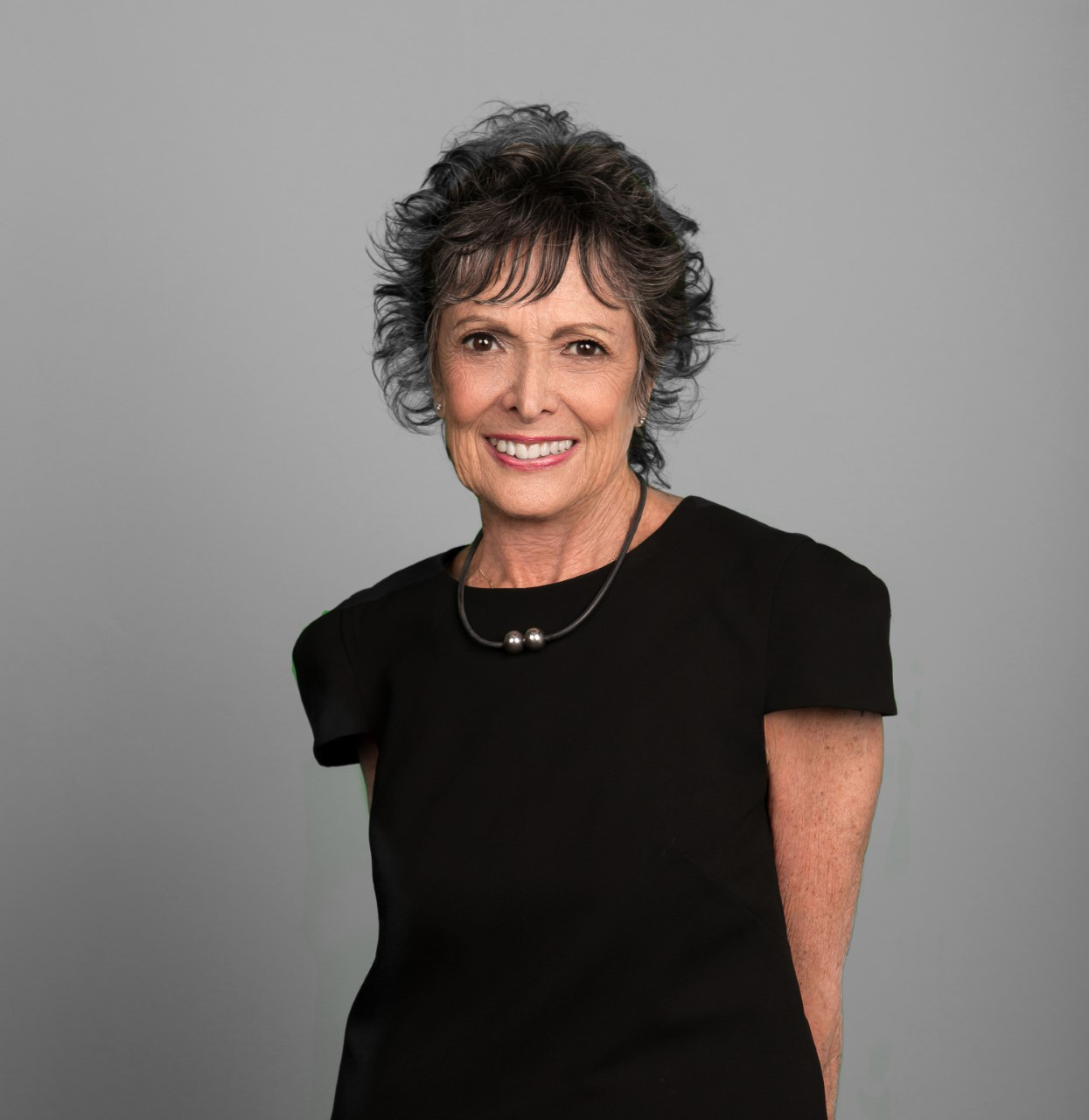
- Born: July 27, 1940 (age 86)
- Occupation: Art curator
- Years active: 1975–present
- Known for: Acting assistant curator, Dallas Museum of Art; Director/curator, Arlington Museum of Art; Director/curator, Dallas Contemporary; Co-founder/director/curator, SITE131, Dallas

Joan Davidow is an American contemporary art expert, and has served as museum director and curator at a number of Texas-based art institutions. She has been an art critic for PBS Texas television and radio stations.

Davidow and her son Seth founded the Dallas-based artspace SITE131.

== Early life and education ==
Davidow grew up in Jacksonville, Florida, and as a young woman attended art classes at the local museum while working part-time with her family at their auto parts shop. In 1962, Davidow graduated from Jacksonville University, becoming a public school art teacher.

After she married, and had two sons, she created her own art, primarily ceramics. Every month, she brought home prints of famous artworks from the local library to hang in her children's rooms. She also volunteered at local arts organizations, including the Jacksonville Art Museum.

Later, Davidow earned a Master of Fine Arts degree in painting at the University of Florida in Gainesville.

== Art career ==
In 1975, Davidow began a three-year stint producing arts coverage for the Jacksonville PBS station, WJCT-TV, eventually going on air. After her family expanded their auto parts business to North Dallas in 1981, she became the volunteer coordinator of the art auction for the Dallas PBS affiliate, KERA-TV.

"I was happier out in the art community than I was inside the studio,” Davidow told Texas Monthly magazine. As a result, she successfully auditioned and got the job as the Public Radio art critic for KERA-FM radio. The job lasted six years and while doing it, she learned "how to talk to an audience that isn’t completely art-knowledgeable."

== Museum affiliations ==
One of Davidow's radio guests, Sue Graze, the contemporary art curator at the Dallas Museum of Art, offered her the position of curatorial intern at the museum in 1989. After Graze eventually left her job, Davidow was named acting curator for contemporary art at Dallas Museum.

Two years later, she was named the first director and curator of the Arlington Museum of Art. Under her direction, the museum focused on showings of emerging Texas artists such as The Art Guys, Linnea Glatt, Joe Havel, John Pomara, Linda Ridgway, and Ludwig Schwarz. She secured funding for the museum from corporate sponsors such as Target, U.S. Trust, and Lockheed Martin. Sheontinued and initiated a variety of youth programs at the Arlington Museum, including a yearly display of art by area children, and another called Night Shelter, providing homeless children the opportunity to make art that was sold to help fund their shelter.

From 2001 to 2010, Davidow served as director/curator for Dallas Contemporary. In her tenure, she increased membership, created Art Think™ – a nationally awarded educational program that served more than 11,000 students annually – and moved the institution into a new, renovated home. In 2010, Davidow was named the 2010 Contemporary Legend at “Here, There & Beyond” event that took place at Dallas Contemporary, sponsored by Modern Luxury Dallas magazine. She has developed taught four contemporary art history courses in Southern Methodist University’s graduate Masters of Liberal Studies programt.

Five years later, she donated her personal art collection of almost 100 works for permanent display in two buildings at University of Texas at Dallas.

In 2015, her son Seth presented Davidow with the idea of joining together to form a non-profit artspace called SITE131 in Dallas. Since then, SITE131 has presented at least four exhibitions of emerging and under-recognized artists annually beginning with "Layering: Different Strokes," with work by Lauren Muggeo, Marjorie Schwarz, and Art Peña.

In 2019, the Dallas Historical Society Award for Excellence in Community Service was presented to her for outstanding contributions in Arts Leadership.

== Key exhibitions ==
Museum	Year	Exhibit	Notes
Dallas Museum of Art	1990	Texas Figurative Drawings	12 regional artists
Arlington Museum of Art	1996	Texas Meets New York: Facing the Millennium – the song remains the same...	Curator: Kenny Schacter, 10 New York artists, including Rachel Harrison
Arlington Museum of Art	1997	Hotel California	Curator: Marcos Rosales, 11 California artists
Arlington Museum of Art	2000	Burn it!	Texas’ The Art Guys
Arlington Museum of Art	2000	Cutting Pattern/Cutting Edge	15 Texas designers display fashion
Dallas Contemporary	2003	Siting Sculpture: site-specific installations celebrate Nasher Sculpture Center opening	15 sculptors
Dallas Contemporary	2003	Pairings: artists’ selections from Dallas Museum of Art collection	8 artists
Dallas Contemporary	2010	HERE. THERE. & BEYOND.	Cindy Santos Bravo, Chad Sager, Gretchen Berggren, Shawne Major, Anne Deleporte, Kit Reisch
Dallas Contemporary	2010	James Gilbert: Warnings & Instructions	Lifesize airplane interiors
SITE131	2016	Black Paintings	Beverly Baker, James Buss, Phoebe Collings-James, Luke Harnden, Maximilian Prüfer
SITE131	2017	Unexpected	Nina Katchadourian, Cameron Schoepp, Jaime Tarazona
SITE131	2018	Fragments	Manuel Burgener, Kelly Kroener, Travis Lycar, Puppies Puppies
