= Ruth G. Waddy =

American artist, printmaker, activist (1909–2003)

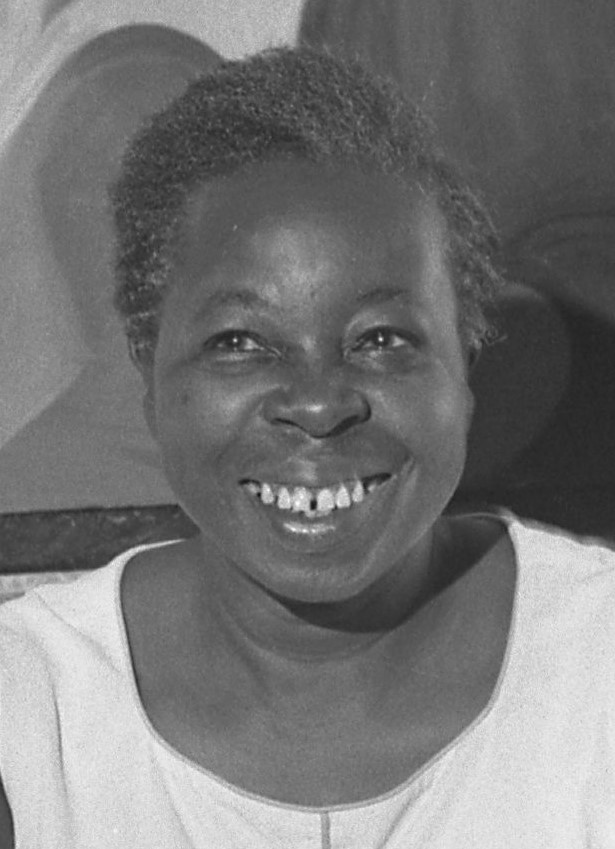
- Waddy in 1966
- Born: Willanna Ruth Gilliam; January 7, 1909; Lincoln, Nebraska, U.S.
- Died: May 24, 2003 (aged 94)
- Known for: Printmaker

Ruth G. Waddy (January 7, 1909 – May 24, 2003) was an American artist, printmaker, activist, and editor, based in Los Angeles, California.

== Early life and education ==
Willanna Ruth Gilliam was born in Lincoln, Nebraska, United States, in 1909, and was raised in Minneapolis, Minnesota, daughter of John Moses Gilliam and Willie Anna Choran Gilliam. She lived near the Minneapolis Museum of Art, which was her first introduction to the art world. Her father worked as a waiter on the railroads; he died when Ruth was thirteen years old. She attended the University of Minnesota to train for teaching, but left school to work as a domestic servant in Chicago, to help support her family during the Depression.

During World War II, she moved with her young daughter to Los Angeles, California, to work as a riveter at Douglas Aircraft Corporation. After the war, she worked at a county hospital, where one of her co-workers was designer Noah Purifoy. While working as a clerk for Los Angeles County, Waddy was diagnosed with epilepsy. This prompted her to retire early. However, she realized she would now have time to accomplish many of the things she had hoped to someday do. One of those things was the intent to learn art.

== Career ==
Waddy was in her fifties when she turned to a career in art, especially as a linocut printmaker. In 1962, she founded Art West Associated, to gather and support the community of African-American artists in Los Angeles. The association sponsored community and youth activities that raised awareness for black art in the area and advocated for black artists who could not get their recognized by mainstream museums. Notable participants included Raymond Lark, Samella Lewis, John Riddle, and Alonzo Davis. Waddy studied briefly at Otis Art Institute, now called Otis College of Art and Design in 1965, and the following year traveled to the Soviet Union for an exhibit of African-American art, organized by a Chicago friend, Margaret Burroughs. Also in 1966, her work was part of The Negro in American Art, a traveling exhibition funded by the California Arts Commission.

Waddy was known for her primary in linocut printmaking. For the most part, she is known for creating very highly contrasting flooring prints that tended to contain stories about Black presence. In one of her most well-known works, The Key, Waddy outlined her artwork with dark geometrical structures and used supplies such as newspapers and magazines to scrap. She would pick subjects from regular daily life as well as influencing pictures of social difficulties. Her work, later on, became one of the most influential artworks in that era, especially in Prints by American Negro Artist (1967). Waddy founded an organization of artists called Art West Associated, which expanded on the groundbreaking work of co-op galleries, including Eleven Associated, which laid the work of Black artists in the 1960s and 1970s in Los Angeles.

Waddy embarked on a cross-country bus trip to gather works for Prints by American Negro Artists (1967), a project funded by the National Endowment for the Arts. With Samella Lewis, she edited Black Artists on Art (1969 and 1971). Waddy and Lewis are considered to be two of the "founding mothers" of the Black Arts Movement in California. Her 1969 linocut print, The Key, is considered to be one of the most prominent pieces in the movement. She received awards from the Compton College in 1972, from the League of Allied Artists in 1981, from the California African American Museum in 1983, and the Vesta Award from the Woman's Building in 1986. She was one of twelve African-American artists honored by the Los Angeles Bicentennial in 1981. She also received a lifetime achievement award from the Women's Caucus for Art in 2001, and an honorary doctorate from Otis Art Institute (now called Otis College of Art and Design) in 1987; the citation read, in part, "Your strong graphic images strike us with aesthetic, emotional, and social power, and your dedication to seeking out the distinctive experience of black artists in America has widened that power."

== Exhibitions ==
A selected list of exhibitions including works by Ruth G. Waddy:

- "Negro History Calendar Art Competition" - Safety Savings and Loan, Los Angeles, 1964
- The Negro in American Art - Dickson Art Galleries, UCLA, Los Angeles, 1966
- University of California, Davis, 1966
- Fine Art Gallery, San Diego, 1967
- New Perspectives in Black Art - Oakland Museum, Oakland, California, 1967
- "Negro History Week Art Exhibit" - Independence Square, Los Angeles, 1968
- Prints by Ruth Waddy - Scott United Methodist Church, Pasadena, California, 1976
- A Vibrant Force - Our Children Museum of African American Art, Los Angeles, 1979
- Impressions/Expressions Studio Museum, Harlem, New York, 1983
- Ruth Waddy, A Retrospective - Gallery Plus, Los Angeles, 1986

== Awards ==
A selected list of awards Ruth G. Waddy received:

- National Association of College Women, Los Angeles, 1963
- Angeles Mesa Young Women's Christian Association, Los Angeles, 1964
- United Nations cultural exchange to the Soviet Union, 1966
- National Conference of Artists, Virginia State University, Petersburg, Virginia, 1968
- Our Authors Study Club, Los Angeles, 1972
- National Conference of Artists, Pacific Region, Berkeley, California, 1976
- League of Allied Artists, Los Angeles, 1981
- California Afro-American Museum, 1983
- Vesta Award - Women's Building, Los Angeles, 1986
- Life Works Plaque Award - National Artists Conference, Los Angeles, 1987
- Honorary Doctor of Arts - Otis Art Institute, Parsons School of Design, New School of Social Research, New York, New York, 1987

== Publications ==
- Prints by American Negro Artists, 1965 (contributor)
- Black Artists on Art, 1969 (author)

== Personal life and legacy ==
Ruth Gilliam married and divorced William H. Waddy in the 1930s; they had one daughter, Marianna (later Maryom Ana Al-Wadi). Ruth G. Waddy died in 2003, aged 94, in San Francisco, California. Her papers are at the Amistad Research Center, Tulane University. A sketchbook that once belonged to Waddy was featured in a 2013 family art workshop sponsored by the Los Angeles County Museum of Art and the Los Angeles Public Library.

Waddy once stated: "Maybe if I had started as young as my peers did, I would be more interested in recognition. Yet, I do have a need to say what I feel out loud, regardless of whether anyone else hears me."
