= Thalia Gouma-Peterson =

Educator and art historian

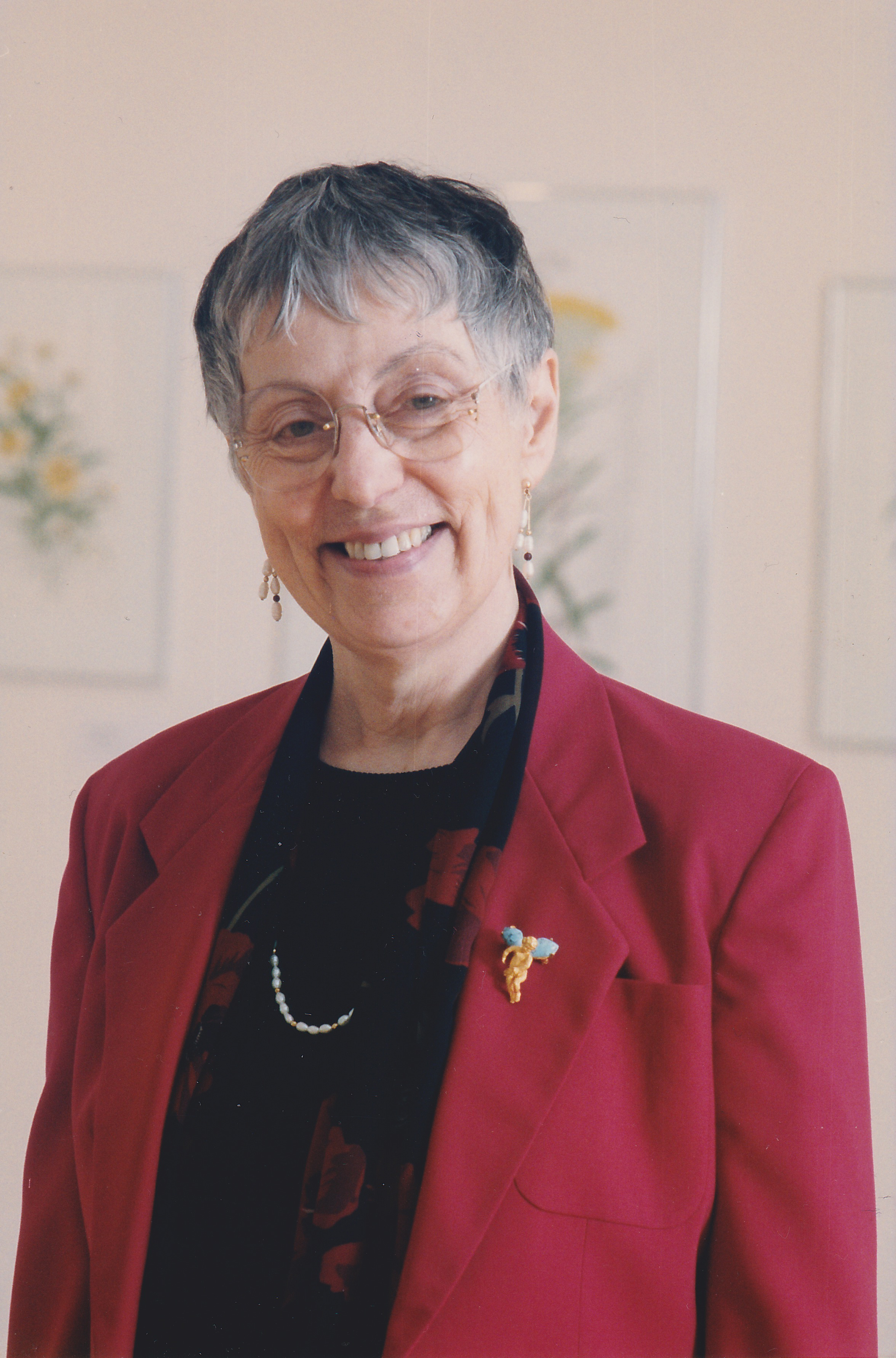
- Thalia Gouma-Peterson April 1999
- Born: November 20, 1933
- Died: June 20, 2001
- Education: Mills College (BA, MA); University of Wisconsin, Madison (PhD)
- Spouse: Carl Peterson
- Awards: Women's Caucus for Art Lifetime Achievement Award 2001

Thalia Gouma-Peterson (1933–2001) was professor emerita of Art History and museum curator at the College of Wooster in Ohio. Born in Athens, Greece she came to the U.S. as a Fulbright student in 1952.

== Education ==
She earned her Bachelor of Arts and Master of Arts degrees in art history at Mills College and her Ph.D. at the University of Wisconsin-Madison.

== Teaching ==
From 1960 to 1968 she was a lecturer in art at Oberlin College. In 1968 she joined the art faculty at the College of Wooster where she was tenured as a full professor in 1976. She chaired Wooster's Art Department for several terms and was director of Wooster's art museum for a number of years.

== Career ==
Her research and writing were concentrated in two distinct fields: Byzantine icons and frescoes (she was trained as a medievalist), and contemporary feminist art. She published in Art Bulletin, Gesta, and Dumbarton Oaks Papers, and organized exhibitions of the work of Miriam Schapiro, Audrey Flack, Faith Ringgold, and Emma Amos. She retired in 1999. In early 2000, Gouma-Peterson published two books that epitomize the primary areas of her research and teaching interests. The first, Miriam Schapiro: Shaping the Fragments of Art and Life, is a full-scale critical and biographical study of the New York artist Miriam Schapiro, best known as one of the founders of the feminist art movement of the late 1970s and 80s. The other, Anna Komnene and Her Times, constituted the culmination of her lifelong interest in Byzantine art and culture, and is a collection of original essays by international scholars on the Byzantine princess Anna Komnene. Gouma-Peterson conceived the idea for the collection, contributed an essay of her own to it, and steered it through a complex editorial process. The volume is one in the Gale series of medieval studies of which Marcia Colish, F.B. Artz Professor of History, was co-editor. A board member of the College Art Association and Women's Caucus for Art, the last trip she embarked on from her home in Oberlin, Ohio was to Chicago in February 2001, to receive a Lifetime Achievement award from the Women's Caucus. The exhibition materials for Impact! The Legacy of the Women’s Caucus for Art called her “a pioneer and inquisitive explorer" and "a powerful model...through example to generations of students.”

== Publications ==
Gouma-Peterson's books include Miriam Schapiro: Shaping the Fragments of Art and Life on the work and life of feminist artist Miriam Schapiro; Breaking the Rules: Audrey Flack A Retrospective 1950 - 1990 and Anna Komnene and Her Times (2000), on the Byzantine princess, scholar, physician, and historian co-edited by Marcia Colish. She and Patricia Mathews co-authored The Feminist Critique of Art History for The Art Bulletin Journal. Her other publications included articles on the artists Elizabeth Catlett, Joyce Kozloff, Faith Ringgold, Athena Tacha, and Ruth Weisberg, among others.

== Awards, honors ==
In 2001, Gouma-Peterson was honored with a Women's Caucus for Art Lifetime Achievement Award.
