= Woman's Art Journal =

- Discipline: Women's studies, feminist art
- Language: English
- Edited by: Joan Marter, Margaret Barlow

Publication details
- History: 1980–present
- Publisher: Old City Publishing (United States)
- Frequency: Biannually

Standard abbreviations
- ISO 4: Woman's Art J.

Indexing
- ISSN: 0270-7993 (print); 2158-8457 (web)
- LCCN: 80647891
- JSTOR: 02707993
- OCLC no.: 6497852

Links
- Journal homepage

The Woman's Art Journal (WAJ) is a feminist art history journal that focuses on women in the visual arts. The journal also serves as a forum "for critical analysis of contemporary art issues as they relate to women."

== Overview ==
The Woman's Art Journal is published twice annually, in May and November, by Old City Publishing, Inc. Ute Tellini is the journal's book editor. The journal's editorial offices are located at Rutgers University.

== History ==
Elsa Honig Fine first proposed a journal on women and the arts at a 1979 meeting of the Women's Caucus for Art. She founded Woman's Art Journal in 1980. Fine wrote that the original goals of the journal were "documenting women artists who were celebrated during their lifetimes but are now lost to art history, looking at the art of the past through a feminist lens, and reviewing the ever expanding number of books on women and issues related to women in all areas of the visual arts."

Fine announced in 2005 that the journal would cease publication. Due to support from the feminist community, the journal continued with Joan Marter and Margaret Barlow becoming co-editors in 2006.
