= Muriel Magenta =

American visual artist

- Born: Muriel Zimmerman; New York City
- Education: BA Queens College, NYC; MA Johns Hopkins University; MFA and PhD Arizona State University, Tempe, AZ
- Known for: New Media Art, art + technology, installation, video, interactive performance
- Movement: Contemporary Art
- Awards: Women's Caucus for Art Lifetime Achievement Award 2002
- Website: murielmagenta.com

Muriel Magenta née Zimmerman is an American visual artist working in new media genres of computer art, installation, multimedia performance as well as video and sculpture. Magenta is Professor of Art at Arizona State University.

== Education ==
Magenta received a BA from Queens College, in New York City, an MA from Johns Hopkins University in Baltimore, MD, and an MFA and PhD from Arizona State University.

== Work ==
Magenta's installations involve the interface between electronic media and the audience, creating visual/perceptual experiences within actual spaces, transforming them into hybrids between virtual environments and lived space. Magenta's video art in the 1980s used controversial techniques such as leaving all crew members uncredited and using a pastiche style utilizing entire segments from the work of peers. Coincidentally, this style was popularized more prominently in the film industry by Quentin Tarantino in the 1990s who instead was candid about his influences from different genres. Magenta has had solo exhibitions at the University of Southern California, Kansas City Art Institute, LACE: Los Angeles Contemporary Exhibitions, Scottsdale Center for the Arts, among others. Her work has been exhibited in group exhibitions at the Whitney Museum of American Art, Brussels International Film Festival, European Media Festival, Brooklyn Film Festival, SIGGRAPH among others.

Magenta served as the National President of the Women's Caucus for Art, and has been involved in the women's art movement for decades in leadership positions. She has curated exhibitions, such as Push Comes to Shove: Women and Power, in collaboration with the Scottsdale Museum of Contemporary Art and Arizona State University.

== Videography ==
Bride (Tempe, Arizona: Muriel Magenta, 2000?).

Club M (Tempe, Arizona: Muriel Magenta, 2009?).

Coiffure Carnival Trilogy (Tempe, Ariz.: Muriel Magenta, 2000?). Includes: Coiffure Carnival: A Permanent Wave of Hair—Salon Doo—In Defense of a Hairdo.

The World's Women On-line!: Videowall. 1995

Times Square: 3D Animation (Arizona: Magenta Productions, 2002).

Token City (Tempe, Ariz.: Institute for Studies in the Arts, Arizona State University, 1997).

28 Women: A Chance for Independence: Documentary (Tempe, AZ: M. Magenta, 2005).

Virtual Justice (Ariz.: Magenta Productions, 1993).

== Exhibitions ==
Muriel Magenta Coiffure Carnival, Video/Sculpture: Scottsdale Center for the Arts, Scottsdale, Arizona, March 29-May 30, 1990. Curated by Robert E. Knight; exhibition catalog essays by J. Gray Sweeney.

== Awards ==
In 2002 Women's Caucus for Art awarded her with a Lifetime Achievement Award.
