= Paula Gerard =

Art educator and visual artist

- Born: 1907; Brighton, England
- Died: 1991; Chicago, Illinois, USA
- Education: School of the Art Institute of Chicago
- Spouse: Herbert Renison
- Awards: Women's Caucus for Art Lifetime Achievement Award

Paula Gerard (1907–1991) was an American art educator, administrator, and visual artist, whose primary work was in drawing, painting, and graphic arts.

Gerard's artwork is included in the collections of major museums, including the Smithsonian Museum of American Art; and the Museum of the Art Institute of Chicago. Other exhibitions include the Chicago Society of Artists, National Academy of Design NYC, San Francisco Art Association, among others. Gerard taught fine art at the Layton School of Art in Milwaukee, Wisconsin from 1945 to 1962. Upon leaving that position, she taught at the School of the Art Institute of Chicago. Upon her retirement from teaching in 1975, she was named an emeritus professor.

== Early life ==
Gerard was born in Brighton, England, and was raised in Florence, Italy. She studied art in Italy, Paris and Brussels. She continued her studies at the Art Institute of Chicago after moving to the United States with her mother, Helen Gerard, who was a writer for art journals, including International Studio and American Magazine of Art.

== Collections and exhibitions ==
Gerard's work is included in major collections: Smithsonian Museum of American Art; Art Institute of Chicago; Library of Congress, Washington DC; Smart Art Gallery, University of Chicago; Ringling Museum, Sarasota, Florida, among others. She had solo exhibitions at the Montgomery Museum of Fine Arts; Mitchell Museum of the American Indian; Mt. Vernon Illinois among other institutions, and two solo exhibitions at the Art Institute of Chicago, in 1947 and 1961.

== Awards and honors ==
In 1992 Gerard was honored with the Women's Caucus for Art Lifetime Achievement Award.
