= Alicia Craig Faxon =

Art historian and writer

- Born: 1931 (age 94–95)
- Education: AB Vassar College (1952); MA Radcliffe College (1953); PhD Boston University (1979)
- Known for: Author, art historian, professor, curator
- Notable work: Dante Gabriel Rossetti; Self-Portraits by Women Painters; Pre-Raphaelite Art in its European Context
- Spouse: Richard Bremmer Faxon
- Awards: Women's Caucus for Art Lifetime Achievement Award

Alicia Craig Faxon is an American art historian, author, curator and educator. She is Professor Emerita at Simmons University, where she also served as Chair of the Department of Art and Music. Faxon also taught at Harvard University, the New England School of Art and the Massachusetts College of Art. She has curated several museum exhibitions, and served as acting director of the Danforth Museum in Framingham, Massachusetts. She authored several books on art history, as well as writing for the popular press, including The Boston Globe. Her archive and papers (c. 1969–2014) are held in the collection of Vassar University Special Collections Library.

== Publications ==
Faxon has authored several books including Dante Gabriel Rossetti, Abbeville Press, that was reviewed in Publishers Weekly and Cosmopolitan. Other books include Self-Portraits by Women Painters (coauthored with Liana Cheney, and Kathleen Russo), published by Ashgate Press in 2000, and Pre-Raphaelite Art in its European Context, and Women and Jesus. She contributed several entries to the Encyclopedia of Comparative Iconography: Themes Depicted in Works of Art, including entries on Fatal Woman/Femme Fatale, Hair/Haircutting, Kiss/Kissing, Sacrifice, Martyrdom, Temptation, Metamorphosis and others.

== Awards and honors ==
Faxon has received honors and awards for her work including the Women's Caucus for Art Lifetime Achievement Award in 1996, and a publication in her honor, Breaking New Ground in Art History: A Festschrift in Honor of Alicia Craig Faxon, edited by Margaret A. Hanni.
