= John Pomara =

American artist

John Pomara is an American abstract artist.

== Life ==
Pomara was born in Dallas in 1952 and received a MFA and a BFA from East Texas State University; he also attended the Empire State Studio Arts Program, New York.

== Work ==
Entropy and mechanical failure are prevalent themes within his work; in his endeavors to visually represent these errors he utilizes printers, copy machines and the Internet. Even the medium upon which he works is evocative of his underlying message, the industrial surfaces of the aluminum panels complementing and enhancing his artistic vision. Pomara's work is oftentimes inspired by the paint drips and spills that landed on the newspaper covering his studio floor.

He teaches at University of Texas, Dallas.

== Permanent collections ==
- Blanton Museum of Art, Austin, TX
- Museum of Art, Dallas, TX
- Museum of Fine Arts, Houston, TX
- American Airlines, Dallas, TX
- The Barrett Collection, Dallas, TX
- Neiman Marcus, Dallas, TX
- Tyler Museum of Art, Tyler, TX
