= Ann Sutherland Harris =

British-American art historian

- Born: Ann Birgitta Sutherland; 4 November 1937 (age 88); Cambridge, England
- Education: PhD Courtauld Institute of Art, London; Honorary Doctor of the Arts, Eastern Michigan University; Honorary Doctor of Humanities, Atlanta College of Art
- Spouse: William V. Harris
- Awards: Women's Caucus for Art Lifetime Achievement Award 2005

Ann Birgitta Sutherland Harris (born 4 November 1937) is a British-American art historian specializing in Baroque art, Modern art, and in the history of women's art.

== Career ==
Harris is an educator, having held her first position in 1965 as an assistant professor in the department of Art and Archeology, Columbia University. She was then appointed Assistant Professor of Art History at Hunter College, City University of New York (1971–1973). Harris was next hired as associate professor at the State University of New York, Albany. Following that she held the Arthur Kittridge Watson Chair for Academic Affairs at the Metropolitan Museum of Art from 1977–1981. Harris received a Senior Research Fellowship in 1981-82 from the National Endowment for the Humanities and in 1982, was named the Amon Carter Distinguished visiting Professor of Art History at the University of Texas at Arlington before accepting the position of Mellon Professor of Art History at the University of Pittsburgh. She is now professor emerita of Italian Baroque art at that institution.

Harris and the feminist art historian Linda Nochlin co-curated the exhibition Women Artists: 1550–1950 at the Los Angeles County Museum of Art in 1976. There was a book written by Harris and Nochlin that accompanied the exhibition, in which Harris proposed that art produced by women from the time of the Middle Ages to the French Revolution was infrequently written about or collected. She argues that an aspect of bias was that women did not have access to the same academic training as men, thus causing their dismissal as "dilettantes".

The American art collector Wilhelmina Cole Holladay sought advice regarding placement of her private collection of works by women artists; it was Harris who suggested Holladay found the National Museum of Women in the Arts.

== Selected bibliography ==
- Selected Drawings of Gian Lorenzo Bernini. New York: Dover Publications, 1977
- Andrea Sacchi: Complete Edition of the Paintings with a Critical Catalogue. Princeton, NJ: Princeton University Press, 1977
- Landscape Painting in Rome, 1595-1675: a Loan Exhibition. New York, NY: R. L. Feigen Gallery, 1985
- Women Artists: 1550-1950. Los Angeles: Los Angeles County Museum of Art/New York: Random House, 1976
- Elizabeth Murray: Drawings, 1980-1986. Pittsburgh: Carnegie Mellon University Art Gallery/New York: Harper and Row, 1986
- Seventeenth-Century Art and Architecture. London [Laurence King], 2005; 2nd ed., 2008

== Awards and honors ==
Harris has received several honors and awards for her work, including a Women's Caucus for Art Lifetime Achievement Award; grants from the John Simon Guggenheim Memorial Foundation, the National Endowment for the Arts, the National Endowment for the Humanities, the Metropolitan Museum of Art, and the J. Paul Getty Museum.
