= Ruth Weisberg =

American artist and educator (born 1942)

- Born: 1942 (age 83–84); Chicago, IL, USA
- Education: Accademia di Belle Arti di Perugia, Italy; University of Michigan
- Awards: Women's Caucus for Art Lifetime Achievement Award 2009

Ruth Weisberg (born 1942) is an American artist and Professor of Fine Arts at the University of Southern California, where she is also former dean of the USC Roski School of Art and Design. Weisberg's work is influenced by her Jewish heritage and its traditions, the human body, and feminist themes. She works primarily in painting, and her recent work is produced in scroll formats.

== Career ==
=== Exhibitions ===
Weisberg has had over 70 solo exhibitions of her work including those at the Norton Simon Museum, Pasadena, CA and the Skirball Museum, Los Angeles. Her work has been shown nationally and internationally in over 190 group shows, at the Whitney Museum of American Art, Smithsonian Institution’s National Museum of American Art, among other venues.

=== Collections ===
Weisberg's work is in over 60 museum collections including the Los Angeles County Museum of Art, the Whitney Museum, the Museum of the School of the Art Institute of Chicago, the Metropolitan Museum of Art, among other national and international institutions. She received her BFA and MFA degrees from the University of Michigan, Ann Arbor.

== Awards and honors ==
Weisberg has received several honors and awards for her work including the Women's Caucus for Art Lifetime Achievement Award 2009; a Printmaker Emeritus Award from the Southern Graphic Council International 2015; the Foundation for Jewish Culture’s 50th Anniversary Cultural Achievement Award 2011; an Honorary Doctorate, Hebrew Union College, 2001 and the College Art Association Distinguished Teaching of Art Award in 1999.
