= Jacqueline Clipsham =

American artist (born 1936)

- Born: Jacqueline Ann Clipsham; 1936; England
- Education: Carleton College; University of Perugia; University of Grenoble; Cleveland Institute of Art, Masters of Art; Case Western Reserve University
- Known for: Ceramics, sculpture
- Style: Contemporary
- Awards: Women's Caucus for Art Lifetime Achievement Award 1995

Jacqueline Clipsham is a sculptor, ceramic artist, disability-rights activist, educator and museum professional.

She was educated at Carleton College, University of Perugia, Italy, University of Grenoble France, Cleveland Institute of Art and Case Western Reserve University. She was a member of the Congress of Racial Equality (CORE) in the 1960s. At the Metropolitan Museum of Art in New York city, she worked for the Disabled Museum Visitors services, acted as a consultant for the National Endowment for the Arts. She taught ceramic arts in Sumter, South Carolina, and later at the Brooklyn Museum Art School in New York. Her work is included in the collections of the Museum of Modern Art, New York, and the Carnegie Museum of Art, Pittsburgh.

== Early life ==
Clipsham was born in England to an American mother and British father, both of whom were engineers. She was born with achondroplasia.

== Exhibitions ==
Clipsham's work has been widely exhibited, including the Center for Book Arts: The First Decade exhibition at the New York Public Library. A retrospective solo exhibition of her work was held in 2001 at the Hunterdon Art Museum in Clinton, New Jersey.

== Collections ==
Clipsham's work is included in major museum collections including the Carnegie Museum in Pittsburgh, PA; Museum of Modern Art, NYC, Cleveland Museum of Art, Newark Museum, and the Hunterdon Art Museum, among other public and private collections.

== Awards and honors ==
In 1966 Clipsham received a National Merit Award for ceramics from the Museum of Contemporary Crafts, New York. In 1982, she was awarded a New York State Council for the Arts grant. In 1987 she was named Distinguished Visiting Artist/Teacher at Carleton College, and also received a Mid-Atlantic Arts Foundation fellowship. In 1995, Clipsham was awarded the Women's Caucus for Art Lifetime Achievement Award.

== Bibliography ==
Obstacles and Opportunities: Careers in the Visual Arts for People With Disabilities, by Jacqueline Ann Clipsham, National Forum on Careers in the Arts for People with Disabilities.
