= Elizabeth Gilmore Holt =

American art historian

- Born: Elizabeth Basye Gilmore; July 5, 1905; San Francisco, California
- Died: January 26, 1987 (aged 81); Washington, D.C.
- Known for: Art Historian
- Spouse: John Bradshaw Holt (m. 1936)

Elizabeth Gilmore Holt (July 5, 1905 – January 26, 1987) was an American art historian.

== Early life and education ==
Elizabeth Basye Gilmore was born in San Francisco, California in 1905, and raised in Madison, Wisconsin; her father Eugene Allen Gilmore was a diplomat and university president. She grew up living at the Eugene A. Gilmore House, which was designed by Frank Lloyd Wright in 1908.

Elizabeth Gilmore was one of the first graduates from the International School Manila, while her father was serving as American vice-governor of the Philippine Islands. She attended the University of Wisconsin–Madison as an undergraduate (class of 1929), earned a master's degree at Radcliffe College in 1932, and her doctoral degree, with an art history thesis written in German, at the Ludwig-Maximilians-Universität München in 1934. She was nominated for an honorary degree by the University of Wisconsin–Madison but died before it could be conferred.

== Career ==
Holt began her teaching career at Duke University. While in North Carolina, she opened a community arts center in Raleigh, under the auspices of the Works Projects Administration. After World War II, she went to Berlin to establish the Office of Women's Affairs for the US Office of Military Government, and was given a small replica of the Freedom Bell for her efforts on behalf of the city's women.

Holt's main work was a documentary history of art, edited compilations of selected and translated works in the development of art. In 1947 her Literary Sources of Art History. An Anthology of Texts from Theophilus to Goethe was published by Princeton University Press, and became the basis of the multi-volume series edited by Holt, titled A Documentary History of Art, first published in the 1950s and 1960s. They have since been reprinted in various editions, including paperbacks for student use. In 1955, Holt was appointed an associate of the American Association of University Women, focusing on the status of women.

In 1979, Elizabeth Gilmore Holt was named a Guggenheim Fellow; she also received a Women's Caucus for Art Lifetime Achievement Award, in 1982.

== Personal life and legacy ==
Elizabeth Gilmore married career diplomat John Bradshaw Holt in 1936; they had three children together. Elizabeth Gilmore Holt died in early 1987, age 81, in Washington, D.C. Her papers are in the Smithsonian Archives of American Art.

Her documentary histories of art remain widely used standards today in the field. There is an Elizabeth Gilmore Holt Prize for Best Graduate Paper in Art History, awarded annually at Syracuse University. At the University of Iowa, there is an Elizabeth Gilmore Holt Scholarship given primarily to married women doctoral students in art and art history.

== Notable works ==
- Elizabeth Gilmore Holt, The Expanding World of Art, 1874-1902 (Yale University Press 1988).
- Elizabeth Gilmore Holt, The Art of All Nations, 1850-1873: The Emerging Role of Exhibitions and Critics (Princeton University Press 1981).
- Elizabeth Gilmore Holt, ed. The Triumph of Art for the Public, 1785-1848 (Princeton University Press 1983).
- Elizabeth Gilmore Holt, ed. From the Classicists to the Impressionists: Art and Architecture in the Nineteenth Century (Yale University Press 1986).
- Elizabeth Gilmore Holt, ed. A Documentary History of Art, Volume 2: Michelangelo and the Mannerists, the Baroque and the Eighteenth Century (Princeton University Press 1982).
- Elizabeth Gilmore Holt, ed., A Documentary History of Art, Volume 1: The Middle Ages and the Renaissance (Doubleday 1957).
