= Ofelia Garcia (artist) =

Curator, educator, academic administrator

- Born: Havana, Cuba
- Education: Escuela Nacional de Bellas Artes in Cuba; BA Manhattanville College; MFA Tufts University; Duke University
- Awards: Women's Caucus for Art Lifetime Achievement Award, 2011

Ofelia Garcia is a Cuban-born American artist, curator, art educator and administrator.

Garcia began painting at a young age. She was inspired by her father's souvenir photographs from his travels, a theme that continues into her current work, which is primarily photography-based. In Cuba, Garcia studied art and sculpture at the Escuela Nacional de Bellas Artes. At nineteen, she emigrated to the United States, seeking political asylum during Castro's revolution.

She was a faculty member and Director of the Studio Art Department at Boston College Art Department, served as General Critic at Pennsylvania Academy of the Fine Arts, served as director of The Print Center in Philadelphia, and was president of the Atlanta College of Art, and president of Rosemont College from 1991 to 1995. She was Professor of Art at William Paterson University where she also served as Dean of the College of the Arts and Communications.

== Exhibitions ==
Garcia curated the exhibition Printed by women: A national exhibition of photographs and prints at the Port of History Museum, Philadelphia, Pennsylvania, and co-authored, with Judith K. Brodsky the exhibition catalog.

== Honors ==
- 2017– Enaire Foundation, second prize
- 2011– Women's Caucus for Art Lifetime Achievement Award.
