= Sue Fuller =

American sculptor (1914–2006)

- Born: August 11, 1914; Pittsburgh, Pennsylvania
- Died: April 19, 2006 (aged 91–92); Southampton, New York
- Education: Carnegie Institute of Technology
- Known for: sculpting, printmaking
- Awards: Carnegie Mellon University Alumni Award of Merit; 1974; Women's Caucus for Art Honor; 1986

Sue Fuller (August 11, 1914 – April 19, 2006) was an American sculptor, draughtsman, author, teacher and printmaker who created three-dimensional works with thread. She was a student of Hans Hofmann in 1934, Stanley Hayter in 1943, and Josef Albers in 1944. She was awarded the Alumni Merit Award by Carnegie Mellon University in 1974, and the Lifetime Achievement Award by Women's Caucus for Art in 1986. A passionate devotee of modern art, Sue Fuller began her career as a printmaker then used some of the techniques she experimented with to develop an original form of sculpture.

== Early life ==
Fuller was born and raised in Pittsburgh, Pennsylvania. Her father was an engineer who helped design bridges. Her mother worked in the home, constantly knitting and crocheting. Because of her mother, Fuller said she felt destined from childhood to work with threads one day. Because of her mother’s work Fuller had access to an abundance of threads. They, “were so wonderful, [she] couldn’t let them go to waste.” As a child, Sue Fuller would accompany her parents to the Carnegie Institute of Technology, where she was impressed by contemporary art from around the world. In high school, Fuller spent a summer painting at the Ernest Thurn School of Art in Gloucester, Massachusetts. It was there that she learned about modern art. In 1932, Fuller enrolled at Carnegie Institute of Technology, where she studied with regionalist artist Joe Jones. In 1934, she returned to the Ernest Thurn School to work under Hans Hofmann. In 1937, Fuller enrolled in a master's degree program at the Columbia University Teachers College. In the same year, Fuller travelled to Europe, where she saw the Degenerate Art Exhibition in Munich.

== Career ==
In 1943, Fuller began working at the Atelier 17 printmaking workshop run by Stanley William Hayter, producing prints for artists including André Masson and Marc Chagall. During this time, she also taught children at the Museum of Modern Art. While working at the MoMA, Fuller studied with Josef Albers, learning many techniques such as Bauhaus techniques, collage making in print, and experimental weaving. Albers greatly influenced Fuller with his interest in optical illusions created by different colors and geometric abstraction. Working with new materials, she revitalized her needle and thread-work that she had begun in childhood. Prints from this period, such as Cacophony (1944), are characterized by their use of lace and string as a relief printing technique. In 1944, five of Fuller's prints were included in the Museum of Modern Art exhibition "Hayter and Studio: New Directions in Gravure". In 1945, Fuller produced her best- known print, a semi abstract soft- grounded etching called The Hen. Fuller was also included in the printmaking selection for "Modern Art in the United States", which opened at the Tate Gallery in London in 1956.

By 1949, Fuller had begun making the abstract string compositions that would become her trademark, and was photographed with one of these large constructions for Life magazine. Fuller's own writing connected her abstract designs in string to the tradition of the cat's cradle, or string figure. In March 1949, Fuller had her first exhibition at the Bertha Shaefer Gallery, where she would continue to exhibit until 1969. In the early fifties, conservation concerns prompted Fuller to embark on a "relentless search for a permanent palette of thread colors," that prompted the artist to move from natural fibers to synthetic monofilaments. In 1951, she exhibited several string compositions at the Corcoran Museum of Art, and was included in the Museum of Modern Art exhibition "Abstract Painting and Sculpture in America." In 1954, the Whitney Museum of American Art acquired Fuller's String Composition #51, and the following year, the Metropolitan Museum of Art acquired her String Composition #50. Fuller also exhibited work at the Smithsonian in Washington, D.C. In the 1940s and 1950s she received fellowships from the Guggenheim and Tiffany Foundations, along with a grant from the National Institute of Arts and Letters.

Included in The Responsive Eye exhibition at the Museum of Modern Art in 1963, Fuller's work later came to be associated with the op art movement that this exhibition helped promote. Fuller received a mid-career survey at the Marion Koogler McNay Art Institute in 1967, an exhibition that brought together almost 100 of her works. Fuller was one of the first artists to use a technique of embedding her designs in plastic resin so that the "composition appears to float within a clear medium." a process for which the artist received a patent in 1969. She described this technique to be like putting "bananas in jello." Although she was born in the beginning of the 20th century her career started in her thirty’s. Sue fuller’s work seems to have pointed forward to the 21st century as she said in 1965 after an exhibit in Boston “The path of a trajectory to the moon, or in orbit around Mars is a line drawing. Translucency, balanced and precision are the aesthetics associated with such graphics. My work in terms of linear geometric progression is visual poetry of infinity in the space age.”

== Process ==
String was Fuller’s medium of choice, whether used in three-dimensional constructions or titled with numbers and embedded in plastic ( a process she patented in the 1960s). Experimenting with the grounds and texture on her intaglio plates let her to study lace making which eventually led her to string. She also studied glassmaking and calligraphy. Studying these materials prompted her to the development of embedding delicate threads into plastic.

== Writings ==
In addition to writings about her own artistic practice, Fuller published several other essays about art and culture. In 1943, Fuller wrote an article for Design exploring the value of art education during wartime. In 1950, she contributed an article on fellow Pittsburgh-born artist Mary Cassatt to the journal Magazine of Art.

Fuller sent letters to a friend, Florence Forst. Many of these letters included photographs, press releases, exhibition posters, exhibition announcements and brochures, exhibition and art catalogs, notes, articles, newspaper clippings, biography and chronology, Christmas and postcards, and pen and ink sketches.

Letters relate to Fuller's artwork; her trips to Iraq and Iran in 1977; exhibitions at the Guggenheim and Brooklyn Museums in 1978; and Fuller's views regarding aesthetic merit and exhibitions of Henri Matisse, Pablo Picasso, Robert Motherwell, Ad Reinhardt, and others. Underlying themes throughout most of her correspondence dealt with feminism and feminist artists Cindy Nemser, feminist organizations like the "Guerrilla Girls," and writings by Linda Nochlin. Other topics discussed include the Bauhaus, Museum of Modern Art, and the College Art Association.
