= Clyde Connell =

American sculptor

- Born: Minnie Clyde Dixon; September 19, 1901; Belcher, Louisiana, United States
- Died: May 2, 1998 (aged 96)
- Education: George Doke Studio, Vanderbilt University, Brenau University
- Known for: Painting, Collage, Sculptures
- Movement: Abstract expressionism
- Awards: Gottlieb Foundation Grant, New York, NY 1982; Honor Award in the Visual Arts, National Women's Caucus for Art 1984; Award in the Visual Arts 5, National Endowment for the Arts and the Southeastern Center for Contemporary Art 1985

Clyde Connell (September 19, 1901 – May 2, 1998) was an American self-taught abstract expressionist sculptor. Her works are known for reflecting the nature of Louisiana and the culture of Jim Crow South.

== Life ==
Born as Minnie Clyde Dixon on a cotton plantation in Belcher, Louisiana, and raised in Belcher, near Shreveport, the seat of Caddo Parish, in northwestern Louisiana, Connell married Thomas Dixon Connell Jr in 1922. She lived and worked in a cabin at Lake Bistineau during her later years.

During her lifetime she was a member of the Presbyterian Women's leadership, representing Louisiana, and traveling to their annual national meeting in New York City. It was there that she discovered abstract impressionism, and became a painter and sculptor. In the 1960s, she set up studio, and worked full-time, making sculpture assemblages of wood, iron, and found material. Connell did not find national recognition until she was 81. In 1984 she was one of six women honored by the Women's Caucus for Art.

She is represented by the Arthur Roger Gallery in New Orleans, and her works are held in many private and public collections, including: The Ogden Museum of Southern Art, the Meadows Museum of Art at Centenary College of Louisiana, the Masur Museum of Art, Tulane University's Law School, the Paul and Lulu Hilliard University Art Museum and University of Albany Art Museum.

Connell is the subject of a one-woman play, Louisiana Women: Clyde written by Lake Charles playwright Carolyn Woosley. The play was on tour throughout Louisiana in Fall 2010. Notes on the research sources for the play were included in Woosley's playscripts' book.

In the year of her death, she was named a Louisiana "Living Legend" by the state of Louisiana. In 2011, the Cameron Art Museum held a retrospective.

== Works ==
Connell was a regional artist and was inspired by the nature, and people of the Louisiana Bayou. She grew up in a segregated American South in a period known for lynchings. Exposure to Black culture of the South at the black congregations she went to as a child and the penal farm her husband supervised affected her works. She volunteered at a Presbyterian church school for black children and was terrorized by night riders circling the schoolhouse to frighten her and the children. During one of these incidents Connell conjured up the sounds of the "swamp orchestra," sounds of night herons, owls, frogs, cicadas, crickets, and the winds of the Louisiana night. Years later she recorded this night music with intricate calligraphic notations on large rolls of brown paper, which she called her "swamp songs." She explored regional themes of social conscience, nature, sound, and a deep spiritual world. She used the nature around her Lake Bistineau cottage home to inspire her style saying “you are in different world. It became a part of me. Where the moss swooped down, I wanted my sculpture to look like it grew out of the earth and was trying to touch the moss.” Her sculptures are known for slender constructions of found objects often covered in a "skin" made of macerated newspaper, brown paper, and Elmer's glue. Connell often applied broken pieces of metal, tools, or other found objects that her son Bryan brought to her by the truckload. Her yard, studio, and home were littered with completed compositions, works in progress, and scraps that eventually found their way into her sculpture.

== Notable works ==
- Numbered and Filed #2, 1984
- Dialogue Gate, 1981
- Bound People, 1987
- Inner Place Habitat, 1977
- Triptych #1, 1991
- Bistineau Memory, 1966

== Sources ==
- Charlotte Moser (1991). Clyde Connell: The Art and Life of a Louisiana Woman. University of Texas Press. ISBN 978-0-292-71141-9.
- Clyde Connell: daughter of the bayou, Meadows Museum of Art, 2000
