= Emily Waheneka =

Native American beadwork artist

- Kis-Sun-Y
- Emily Waheneka in 2002
- Born: February 11, 1919; Simnasho, Oregon
- Died: January 28, 2008 (aged 88)
- Resting place: Warm Springs, Jefferson County, Oregon
- Known for: beadwork
- Style: traditional
- Spouse: Grant Waheneka
- Awards: Women's Caucus for Art Lifetime Achievement Award 1993

Emily Waheneka (February 11, 1919 – January 28, 2008) was a Native American artist, of Warm Springs, Wasco and Paiute tribal heritage.

Waheneka is a beadworker in the Sahaptin traditions, her original designs embody the Warm Springs tradition. The Sahaptin peoples include the confederated tribes on the Yakima, Warm Springs, and Umatilla reservation. During her lifetime, she was influenced by her mother and grandmother's beadwork, and was an active participant in Waashat religion, community, and culture. She is known for her beadwork and other sewn crafts. The range of her work included beaded contoured bags, tobacco pouches, ceremonial buckskin dancing attire such as wing-dresses and ribbon shirts, as well as designs for Pendleton coats.

By 1805, beads, which were introduced by Europeans, played an important role in the local trade economy for many Native peoples. Trade beads came in a wide range of colors allowing Native American artists to experiment. Sahaptin peoples developed their own distinguishing beadwork identified by a simplified, bold designs.

By teaching and counseling, Waheneka kept alive the visual arts traditions and history of her people. Her work is represented in numerous private collections, and in the permanent collections of The Museum at Warm Springs in Oregon and the Museum of Northwest Art. She taught traditional Native bead working, and was certified by the Native American Arts & Crafts council.

== Early life ==
Waheneka was born on February 11, 1919, in Simnasho, Oregon. She was given the Native name, Kis-Sun-Y. Her father, Howard George Henning, died in November 1918 before Waheneka was born. Her mother was Annie Anderson Pewee, who was also a beadworker and weaver of corn husk bags. Waheneka learned to sew at the age of six. She studied customary art forms from her elders and her work was shaped by her mother's and grandmother's magnificent examples, who taught her to "scrape deer hides, tan deer hide, cut and sew buckskin gloves, moccasins, vests, coats, jackets, corn husk weaving of root bags, and needle and thread sewing." Her first language is Sahaptin. In 1925, she began learning English at Indian boarding school. At the boarding schools, she was told never to speak or talk in her "Indian language." At age 12, she began working as a waitress and continued to refine her sewing, beading, and hide-tanning skills during the summer months.

During WWII she worked as a certified welder in shipyards. She was authorized and chosen to work as a welder, wherever there were leaks on tankers, carriers, landing crafts, and mine sweepers. Following the war, Waheneka worked at an Indian boarding school as a baker and cook. She also assisted with hospital work as a nurses' aide and cook. On November 13, 1951, she married Air Force Sergeant Grant Waheneka. She spent the next 20 years on the Air Forces bases. In 1963, after her husband had retired, they returned to Warm Springs. She and Grant adopted their son, Dolan, when he was four while in Amarillo, Texas. Their daughter is Marjorie Williams Waheneka. They have twenty-two grandchildren, including the grandchildren from Grant Waheneka's first marriage to Fannie (Scott) Clydehawks.

== Career ==
Waheneka was involved in the ceremonial and cultural life of her Washat community and religion. She creates, "fully contoured bags and beaded articles for ceremony, dancing, and everyday use." She has made entire "traditional men's and women's buckskin dancing outfits with elaborately beaded aprons, hair pieces, medallions, side purses, tobacco pouches and other accessories, as well as designs Pendleton coats and jackets, ribbon shirts, and wing dresses worn in ceremony and at pow-wows." She designed a fully beaded dance cape for Miss Warm Springs in 1990. She is acknowledged for her craftsmanship, style, drawing, complex designs, and color sense. She generated her own abstract and figurative designs and bead designs that have been passed down through generations. She focused on flatwork or string work using tiny, imported cut glass beads for her representative portraits of Native people. Some of her beadwork consists of cutbeads, sizes #14, smaller size #16 and #18 beads, which are no longer made. These beads were imported from Czechoslovakia and Italy. Waheneka achieved three-dimensionality in her intricate portrait medallions, which is unusual for Native American beadwork. Wakeneka often advised people wishing to purchase museum quality contemporary and historic beadworks and worked as a liaison helping other Native artists sell their work.

== Awards and honors ==
In 1993, Waheneka was awarded the Women's Caucus for Art Lifetime Achievement Award. At age 86, Waheneka was interviewed for the oral history project, the Lewis and Clark Rediscovery Project, of the University of Idaho, where she discusses the diseases introduced into native populations as the result of the Lewis and Clark expedition.

== Exhibitions ==
Waheneka's work was featured in the exhibition, Washington Voices in Contemporary Sculpture, at the Bellevue Arts Museum from January to the end of March, 1993.

== Collections ==
Waheneka's work is represented in collections of the Warm Springs Museum and the Museum of Northwest Art, among others. Most of her works remains with the Paiute people. Tribal members have been honored at traditional give-away ceremonies with her beadwork.
