= Susan DeRenne Coerr =

American artist (1939–2007)

Susan (Susie) DeRenne Coerr
- Born: December 15, 1939; New York, New York
- Died: September 15, 2007 (aged 67); San Francisco, California
- Education: Carleton College, University of Maryland, San Francisco State College

Susan (Susie) deRenne Coerr (1939-2007) was an American artist, educator and co-founder of the Northern California Chapter of the Women's Caucus for Art.

== Early life ==
Coerr (pronounced "core") was born December 9, 1939, in New York City to Wymberly, a diplomat, and Janet (nee Stanton Hill), a native of Cuernavaca, Mexico. Her father's work took them to Uruguay and Ecuador in the 1960s, and as a result, Coerr spent much of her youth abroad, graduating from George School, a Pennsylvania boarding school, in 1958 at age 19. Throughout her life, she preferred to go by "Susie", but used her middle name, deRenne, in professional contexts and in publications.

== Education ==
After finishing her secondary education, Coerr graduated in 1962 with a B.A. in fine art from Carlton College, a small, private liberal arts school in Minnesota. In 1966, she completed her M.A. with a concentration in print making at the University of Maryland. In 1968, she received her Standard Teaching Credential from San Francisco State College.

== Career ==
Beginning in 1964, Coerr taught art and printmaking in Maryland and at Clarion State College in Pennsylvania. After moving to San Francisco, in the early 1970s, she worked for 10 years as a registrar at the Fine Arts Museums of San Francisco, the largest public arts institution in the city. During this time she continued teaching and, in 1973, co-founded that Northern California Chapter of the Women's Caucus for Art, serving as the national organization's fifth president from 1980-1982. In 1984, Coerr became a member of the American Society of Indexers, and founded a indexing business that specialized in books about architecture, design, media, popular culture, museums, history, education, Latin America and women's studies. She remained an active member of the Society until her death, writing and teaching seminars about indexing and editing. Her archive is held at the Betty Boyd Dettre Library and Research Center at the National Museum of Women in the Arts, and contains correspondence, clippings, photographs and printed matter.
