= Michi Itami =

Japanese-American visual artist

- Born: 1938 (age 87–88); Los Angeles, California
- Education: BA in English Literature, University of California Los Angeles, Columbia University, University of California, Berkeley
- Known for: printmaking, painting, ceramics, digital media artist
- Awards: National Endowment for the Arts, 1981; Women's Caucus for Art Lifetime Achievement Award, 2004

Michi Itami (born 1938) is a Japanese-American visual artist. Her work includes printmaking, painting, ceramics and digital art and has been exhibited internationally. She has had solo exhibitions at A.I.R. Gallery, New York; 2221 Gallery in New Delhi, India; Shinsegae Gallery in Seoul, Korea; Beni Gallery in Kyoto, Japan, among others. In 2004 Itami was awarded a Lifetime Achievement Award from the Woman's Caucus on Art. She taught at the San Francisco Art Institute and at California State University, Hayward, and is Professor Emerita at City University of New York where she taught for over 20 years. Itami received a BA in English Literature from UCLA in 1959; later studied at Columbia University in New York where she performed graduate work from 1959 to 1962 in Japanese and English literature, later receiving a MA degree in 1971 from the University of California Berkeley. She was a member of Godzilla, an Asian American arts advocacy group.

== Early life ==
Itami and her family were incarcerated at the Manzanar War Relocation Center during World War II following the signing of Executive Order 9066. Her father, Akira Itami, was the model for a character in Toyoko Yamasaki's 1983 novel titled "Futatsu no Sokoku", Two Motherlands.

== Awards, honors ==
Itami has received a National Endowment for the Arts grant in printmaking, a New York Foundation for the Arts Grant, and a Printmaking Fellowship in Asilah, Morocco.

== Collections ==
Itami's work is included in those at the Brooklyn Museum, San Francisco Legion of Honor Museum, National Gallery of Art (Washington, DC), National Museum of Modern Art, Kyoto, Japan, Cincinnati Art Museum and the San Francisco Museum of Modern Art.
