= Alessandra Comini =

American art historian and curator

- Born: November 24, 1934 (age 91); Winona, Minnesota
- Education: Barnard College; University of California, Berkeley; Columbia University
- Employer: Southern Methodist University
- Known for: Professor of Art History

Alessandra Comini (born November 24, 1934) is an American art historian and curator. She is University Distinguished Professor of Art History Emerita at Southern Methodist University in University Park, Texas. Proficient in music and languages as well as art history, Comini brought an interdisciplinary approach to her study of the arts in Austria and Germany at the turn of the 20th century, an approach particularly suited to the integrated art forms of fin-de-siècle Vienna.

== Early and personal life ==
Alessandra Comini was born the daughter of Megan Laird and Raiberto Comini in Winona, Minnesota. Her earliest years were spent in Barcelona, Milan, and Dallas. Comini received her B.A. from Barnard College (1956), her M.A, from the University of California, Berkeley (1964), and her Ph.D. from Columbia University (1969). Her dissertation, written under Theodore Reff, on the topic of Egon Schiele's portraiture.

In 1974 she started working with art historian Eleanor Tufts at Southern Methodist University. Tufts became her life partner.

== Career ==
While teaching at Columbia between 1965 and 1974, Comini became one of the founders of the Women's Caucus for Art in 1972.

She taught at Southern Methodist University from 1974 until 2005. And she guest taught at the University of California, Berkeley (1967) and Yale University (1973). Voted outstanding professor sixteen times by her students, Comini served as the Alfred Hodder Resident Humanist at Princeton University (1972–1973) and was named Distinguished Visiting Lecturer at Oxford University's European Humanities Research Centre (1996).

Celebrated for her public lectures, Comini has been in demand as a guest speaker nationally and internationally. As an interdisciplinary speaker, Comini lectured repeatedly at the Leipzig Gewandhaus symposia, The Santa Fe Opera, and for the Indianapolis and Dallas Symphony Orchestras.

In 1990 Comini was awarded the Grand Decoration of Honour for Services to the Republic of Austria in recognition of her contributions to Germanic culture.

In 2014 Comini turned to fiction writing and has published nine art history murder mystery novels since in the Megan Crespi Series.

The Neue Galerie Museum for German and Austrian Art, New York, commissioned Comini to curate its blockbuster exhibition Egon Schiele's Portraits (2014–15).

== Honors and awards ==
Comini's book Egon Schiele’s Portraits (1974) was nominated for a National Book Award (1975) and received the College Art Association's Charles Rufus Morey Book Award (1976). Comini's book The Changing Image of Beethoven: A Study in Mythmaking (1987) was a pioneer application of reception history to imagery.

- 1995 – Women's Caucus for Art, Lifetime Achievement Award
- 1996 – United Methodist Church Scholar/Teacher of the Year Award
- 2002 – Texas Hall of Fame nomination
- 2005 – Comini Lecture Series established, Southern Methodist University
- 2010 – Medal of Honor, Veteran Feminists of America
- 2011 – Distinguished Alumna Award, Barnard College
- 2012 – International Symposium, Neulengbach, Austria, "Alessandra Comini und Neulengbach"
- 2018 – Golden Honor of Merit for Services to the State of Lower Austria
- 2019 – Alessandra Comini International Fellowship for Study Abroad, founded by Meadows School of the Arts, Southern Methodist University

== Selected publications ==
In a statistical overview derived from writings by and about Alessandra Comini, OCLC/WorldCat OCLC/WorldCat (retrieved June 21, 2016) encompasses about 200 works.

- Schiele in Prison, Greenwich, New York Graphic Society, 1973. ISBN 0-8212-0537-4
- Egon Schiele's Portraits, Berkeley, University of California Press, 1974, 1990. ISBN 0-520-01726-9 (new edition, 2014, Santa Fe, Sunstone Press ISBN 978-1-63293-012-5)
- Gustav Klimt, New York, George Braziller, 1975 (French, German, and Dutch editions; reissued 1986, 1990, 1994, 2001) ISBN 0-8076-0805-X
- Egon Schiele, New York, George Braziller, 1976 (Italian, French, German, and Dutch editions; reissued 1986, 1994, 2001) ISBN 0-8076-0819-X
- The Fantastic Art of Vienna, New York, Alfred A. Knopf, 1978. ISBN 0-394-50263-9 (new edition 2016, Santa Fe, Sunstone Press ISBN 978-1-63293-153-5)
- "The Visual Brahms: Idols and Images," Arts Magazine, 1979
- "The Age of Goethe Today: Of Plum Trees, Painters, Pianists, and Pamphleteers," Arts Magazine, 1988
- The Changing Image of Beethoven: A Study in Mythmaking, New York, Rizzoli, 1987, new edition 2008, Santa Fe, Sunstone Press ISBN 0-8478-0617-0
- "Gender or Genius? The Women Artists of German Expressionism," Feminism and Art History: Questioning the Litany, Norma Broude and Mary D. Garrard, eds., New York, Harper & Row, 1982. ISBN 0-06-430525-2
- "Nordic Luminism and the Scandinavian Response to Impressionism," World Impressionism, Norma Broude, ed., New York, H. N. Abrams, 1990. ISBN 0-8109-1774-2
- "Siegesallee und Salome," Kunst und Politik in den entscheidenden Jahren von Richard Strauss, Leipzig, Gewandhaus, 1991
- "Kollwitz in Context: The Formative Years," Käthe Kollwitz, Elizabeth Prelinger, ed., New Haven, Yale University Press, 1992. ISBN 0-300-05729-6
- "Violetta And Her Sisters," Violetta And Her Sisters: The Lady of the Camellias, Responses to the Myth, Nicholas John, ed., London, Faber and Faber, 1994. ISBN 0-571-16665-2
- "Toys in Freud’s Attic," Picturing Children: Construction of Childhood between Rousseau and Freud, Marilyn Brown, ed., Burlington, VT, Ashgate, 2002. ISBN 0-7546-0277-X
- In Passionate Pursuit — A Memoir, New York, George Braziller, Inc., 2004. ISBN 0-8076-1523-4 (new edition 2016, Santa Fe, Sunstone Press ISBN 978-1-63293-140-5)
- Egon Schiele: Portraits, Alessandra Comini ed., "Egon Schiele: Redefining Portraiture in the Age of Angst," Munich, Prestel, 2014. ISBN 978-3-7913-5419-4
- "The Two Gustavs: Klimt, Mahler, and Vienna’s Golden Decade, 1887–1907," Naturlauf: Scholarly Journals toward Gustav Mahler, Essays in Honour of Henry-Louis de La Grange for His 90th Birthday, Paul-André, ed., New York, Peter Lang Publishing Inc., 2015. ISBN 978-1-43312530-0

=== Megan Crespi series ===
- Killing for Klimt, Santa Fe, Sunstone Press, 2014. ISBN 978-1-63293-025-5
- The Schiele Slaughters, Santa Fe, Sunstone Press, 2015. ISBN 978-1-63293-025-5
- The Kokoschka Capers, Santa Fe, Sunstone Press, 2015. ISBN 978-1-63293-077-4
- The Munch Murders, Santa Fe, Sunstone Press, 2016. ISBN 978-1-63293-103-0
- The Kollwitz Calamities, Santa Fe, Sunstone Press, 2016. ISBN 978-1-63293-157-3
- The Kandinsky Conundrum, Santa Fe, Sunstone Press, 2018. ISBN 978-1-63293-213-6
- The Mahler Mayhem, Santa Fe, Sunstone Press, 2019. The Beethoven Boomerang, Santa Fe, Sunstone Press, 2020. ISBN 978-1-63293-247-1
- The Beethoven Boomerang, Santa Fe, Sunstone Press, 2020. ISBN 978-1-63293-309-6

== See also ==
- Women in the art history field
