= Helen Serger =

Gallerist

- Born: 1901; Silesia, Poland
- Died: 1989 (aged 87–88); New York, NY
- Occupations: Gallery owner, La Boetie, Upper East Side, NYC
- Known for: Women's Caucus for Art Lifetime Achievement Award

Helen Serger was a gallerist and dealer of modern art, in particular early 20th C. European avant-garde art. She is also known for presenting pioneering exhibitions of women artists such as Hannah Höch and Sonia Delaunay.

== Gallery ==
Serger founded the gallery La Boetie on the Upper East Side of New York City. She wrote and published numerous exhibition catalogs on the artists and art movements shown at her gallery, these include Paintings, drawings, watercolors and prints by 20th century masters (1972), Art of the Bauhaus: artists and publications (1982), Hannah Höch, 1889-1978 : oil paintings and works on paper (1983), Sonia Delaunay, rythmes et couleurs, in collaboration with Kunsthandel Wolfgang Werner KG, Bremen (1987), and Strictly Drawings: 20th Century Masters (1985) The Frederick and Helen Serger Collection, Bequest of Helen Serger, in honor of William S. Lieberman is housed by the Metropolitan Museum, New York. Serger's Gallery also exhibited the work of Kurt Schwitters, Paul Klee, Egon Schiele, Wassily Kandinsky and other masters of Modern Art. The Serger Collection, now housed by the Metropolitan Museum of Art in New York includes works by Pierre Bonnard, Marc Chagall, Lyonel Feininger, Josef Albers among others.

Serger was a supporter of women artists at a time when there was scarce representation of women's work. Notably, in the 1980s, she organized and presented two exhibitions titled Women of the Avant-garde. The critic, Hilton Kramer reviewed the first of these shows, writing: "...the exhibition brings us into contact with the work of a significant number of artists - especially among the Europeans - who are likely to be unknown to us. And even where some of the names are well known...the particular works we are shown are not familiar." Marlow Moss of the New York Times cited several of these women as "real revelations."

Serger traveled the world for business as well as to learn about art and other cultures; she continued to do so into her eighties.

== Awards ==
In 1990, Serger was awarded a Women's Caucus for Art Lifetime Achievement Award.

== Early life ==
Serger was born in 1901 in Silesia in Central Europe, a town that was in the Austrian-Hungarian empire at the time, and that is now part of Poland. She and her husband Frederick Serger, an artist, began collecting modern art in the 1930s while still living in Europe. She became a serious collector and would often purchase works of art in Paris. During the 1939 invasion of Poland, Serger had to abandon her collection, but bought her knowledge and passion for collecting art with her. The Sergers moved to New York City in 1941, and began a business as a private gallerist in the 1950s.
