= Jane Teller =

American printmaker

- Born: Jane Simon; July 5, 1911; Rochester, NY
- Died: December 23, 1990 (aged 79)
- Occupation: Artist
- Known for: Sculpture, printmaking

Jane Teller (July 5, 1911 — December 23, 1990) was an American printmaker and sculptor.

== Early life and education ==
Jane Simon was born in 1911, in Rochester, New York. Simon attended Rochester Institute of Technology and Skidmore College, and earned a bachelor's degree from Barnard College in 1933. She pursued further art studies through Works Project Administration classes in New York City, and in classes with Aaron Goodelman, Karl Nielson, and Ibram Lassaw.

== Career ==
Jane Teller taught sculpture at Princeton University in the 1960s, and exhibited her sculptures through the 1980s. "The strong consistency of Mrs. Teller's vision," noted a New York Times reviewer, "is expressed through a few primary forms that recur with many variations. Cylinders and circles, always referring to an organic rather than a geometric form, are at the core of many pieces." Another Times reviewer, William Zimmer, assured readers that Teller was "practically an institution in New Jersey," though her work was not so well known beyond the Northeast during her lifetime.

Teller won the Mary and Gustave Kellner Prize from the National Association of Women Artists in 1960, the Sculpture Prize from the Philadelphia Art Alliance in 1966, and a Women's Caucus for Art Lifetime Achievement Award in 1988.

== Personal life and legacy ==
Jane Simon married author Walter Teller; together they had four sons. They lived on a farm at Plumsteadville, Pennsylvania, and in Lahaska, Pennsylvania, before settling in Princeton, New Jersey. One of her sons married film director Claudia Weill.

Teller died in 1990. Her papers are part of the research collection at the Archives of American Art at the Smithsonian Institution. Her sculptures can be seen at Temple Judea in Doylestown, Pennsylvania, at Princeton's Unitarian Church, at the Skidmore College Library, at Princeton University Art Museum, and in the collection of the James A. Michener Art Museum. Her family provided funding in her memory, for an exhibit on women printmakers by the Arts Council of Princeton in early 2015.

== Selected exhibition catalogs ==
- Jane Teller: Retrospective (Schick Art Gallery, Skidmore College, Saratoga Springs NY, October 9—November 2, 1986).
- Jane Teller: Powerful Presences/Tender Connections: A Retrospective Exhibition of Sculptures and Drawings (Noyes Museum, Oceanville NY, September 24—December 13, 1987).
- Art, Age, and the River: Jane Teller (Princeton NJ 1991).
