= Jean Lacy =

Museum educator and visual artist (1932–2023)

- Born: Laura Jean Lacy; 1932; Washington, D.C., U.S.
- Died: March 25, 2023 (aged 90); Dallas, Texas, U.S.
- Education: North Texas State University; BA Southern University, 1956, Baton Rouge, Louisiana; Art Students League of New York, 1956–57; Otis Art Institute, 1958, Los Angeles
- Spouse: Reverend Nathanial Lacy
- Awards: Women's Caucus for Art Lifetime Achievement Award

Jean Lacy (1932 – March 25, 2023) was an American museum education specialist and visual artist who worked primarily in mixed media and collage.

Lacy was of African American heritage, and believes her family is descended from indentured Africans at Jamestown Colony. Her work is inspired by creation myths and religious stories, the Civil Rights Movement, and African American culture. From 1975-77 she held the position of curator of education and exhibitions at the Museum of African-American Life and Culture in Dallas, Texas. From 1977-88 she served as the director of the African American Cultural Heritage Center of the Dallas Independent School District.

Lacy died in Dallas on March 25, 2023, at the age of 90.

== Exhibitions ==
In 2009, Lacy had a solo exhibition, Divine Kinship: Ancient Forms and Social Commentary, the Art of Jean Lacy, at the Tyler Museum of Art. Her work has been included in the group exhibitions including Black Artists/South at the Huntsville Museum of Art in Alabama; the National Urban League Expo in Houston, TX, and in the African American Artists of Dallas exhibition at Southern Methodist University Gallery.

== Collections ==
Lacy's work is in the collection of the Dallas Museum of Art, and the Museum of Fine Arts, Houston.

== Public Art ==
Lacy was commissioned to create a stained glass window honoring Rosa Parks at the Sanctuary of St. Luke Community United Methodist Church in Dallas, TX. She has also received commissions for stained glass windows in Houston.

== Awards, honors ==
In 1995, Lacy received the Women's Caucus for Art Lifetime Achievement Award.
