= Elinor Gadon =

American historian (1925–2018)

Elinor W. Gadon
- Born: September 17, 1925
- Died: May 8, 2018 (aged 92)
- Awards: Women's Caucus for Art Lifetime Achievement Award, 2006

Academic background
- Education: University of Michigan, B.A. English, 1947; University of Massachusetts, Amherst M.A. History of Art, 1974; University of Chicago, Ph.D. Committee on the History of Culture, 1984

Academic work
- Main interests: Cultural history, Art history, Gender studies

Elinor W. Gadon (September 17, 1925 – May 8, 2018) was an American cultural historian, Indologist, art historian and author notable for her examination of women in myth and culture in history.

== Career ==
Gadon has taught at several educational institutions, including the Harvard Divinity School and Tufts University, where she was an associate scholar in the Women's Leadership Program. At the California Institute of Integral Studies in San Francisco, she developed and directed a course in women's spirituality. In 2006, she became a resident scholar at Brandeis University's Women's Studies Research Center Scholars Program in Waltham, Massachusetts.

Gadon's research has focused on the analysis of myth and imagery within their specific cultural contexts and how they affect issues of gender. In part due to her major publication, The Once and Future Goddess, she has been compared to other "scholars of the goddess" such as Marija Gimbutas and others associated with the Goddess movement.

Indian art history has been a particular area of interest for Gadon.

== Spirituality ==
Whether they are practicing their spirituality alone, in groups, or in their synagogues or churches of origin, women of the movement are focusing on exploring the sacredness of the female body, sexuality, and women's experience.

— Elinor Gadon

Gadon was a proponent of female spirituality, and argued that western-oriented religions have a dearth of female-oriented imagery and symbolism, in contrast to Eastern religions such as Hinduism.

Women in particular feel that within organized religion, there isn't any honor of what they hold sacred: the life process, the birth of their children, their sexual experiences.

— Elinor Gadon, 2003

== Selected publications ==
- — (1989). The Once and Future Goddess: A Symbol for Our Time. New York: Harper & Row. ISBN 978-0062503466.
- — (Summer 2003). "Picasso and the Minotaur". India International Centre Quarterly. 30 (1): 20–29. JSTOR 23005839.
- Shulamit Reinharz; Elinor W. Gadon (2007). Tiger by the Tail!: Women Artists of India Transforming Culture. Waltham, MA: Brandeis University. ISBN 9780979809408.

== Awards ==
- Women's Caucus for Art Lifetime Achievement Award, 2006.
