= Elizabeth Layton =

American "outsider" artist (1909–1993)

- Born: Elizabeth Hope Converse; October 27, 1909; Wellsville, Kansas
- Died: March 15, 1993 (aged 83)
- Education: Ottawa University
- Patrons: Smithsonian's National Museum of American Art; Delaware Art Museum.

Elizabeth Layton (October 27, 1909 – March 15, 1993), also called "Grandma" Layton, was an American artist.

== Early life and education ==
Elizabeth Hope Converse was born in Wellsville, Kansas in 1909. Her father Asa Finch Converse was a newspaper publisher, and her mother May Frink Converse wrote a weekly column for the newspaper. May Converse was named the Poet Laureate of Kansas in 1928. Elizabeth left college to marry her first husband, Clyde Nichols.

== Career ==
Elizabeth Converse Nichols assisted her widowed mother as editor of the Wellsville Globe, from 1942 to 1957. Layton became an artist in her sixties, when she took a drawing class at Ottawa University in 1977. Layton credited this new pursuit with curing her depression and comforting her grief over her son's death in 1976. Her works are often self-portraits, detailed pencil line drawings, sometimes humorous, with references to political issues such as women's rights and the threat to defund the National Endowment for the Arts over controversial art. She exhibited her drawings first in Kansas, and later throughout the US. Collections of her work are also displayed in the Spencer Museum of Art and Lawrence Arts Center in Lawrence, Kansas, as well as at the Mulvane Art Museum in Topeka, Kansas.

In 1992, shortly before she died, Layton was the focus of shows at the Smithsonian's National Museum of American Art and the Delaware Art Museum. In 2001, Layton was the only American artist featured in an exhibit of naive art at the Musée d'Art Brut & Art Singulier in Paris.

Layton did not sell her works, despite demand, but she did donate them for causes that interested her.

== Honors ==
In 1980, Elizabeth Layton was chosen as a "Governor's Artist," a statewide honor in Kansas. Earlier in 1980, Layton received first place out of 600 entries from the four states comprising the Nelson-Atkins Museum of Art, Kansas City, Missouri, Mid-Four Annual Juried show. Layton was named "Distinguished Kansan of the Year" by the Native Sons and Daughters of Kansas in 1989. In 1990 she received a Women's Caucus for Art Lifetime Achievement Award.

== Personal life and legacy ==
Elizabeth Layton was married twice and divorced once; she raised five children. She experienced depression for much of her life, leading to some psychiatric hospitalizations and multiple rounds of electroconvulsive therapy.

Layton died in 1993, age 85, after a stroke. She was survived by her second husband, Glenn F. Layton Sr. Her works may be found in the collections at the Smithsonian American Art Museum, the Mulvane Art Museum, and the Lawrence Arts Center, among other institutions.

The Elizabeth Layton Center for Hope and Guidance is a mental health clinic in Kansas, named in the artist's memory.
