= Elsa Honig Fine =

American art historian, editor, publisher

Elsa Honig Fine (May 24, 1930 – April 7, 2025) was an American art historian. She was the editor and publisher of Woman's Art Journal, which she founded in 1980. She also published two textbooks, including The Afro-American Artist: A Search for Identity (1973) and Women and Art: A History of Women Painters and Sculptors from the Renaissance to the 20th Century (1978).

== Biography ==
"Elsa Betty Honig was born on May 24, 1930, in Bayonne, N.J., to Samuel M. Honig, a lawyer, and Yetta Edith (Susskind) Honig, who managed the home and worked for a submarine company during World War II". The summer she was 20 years old she studied in Provincetown, Massachusetts, with the Abstract Expressionist painter Hans Hofmann. The following year, she graduated from Syracuse University with a B.F.A. in painting and married Harold J. Fine, a psychologist. Fine went on to earn a master's degree in education from Temple University in Philadelphia, in 1967, and a Ph.D. in education from the University of Tennessee, in 1970. Her dissertation was on the education of Afro-American artists and was published as a textbook in 1973.
