= Shifra Goldman =

American art historian

- Born: Shifra Meyerowitz; July 18, 1926; New York City
- Died: July 11, 2011 (aged 84); Los Angeles, California
- Education: University of California, Los Angeles; California State University, Los Angeles
- Occupation: art historian
- Spouse: John Garcia

Shifra Goldman (née Meyerowitz; July 18, 1926 – September 11, 2011) was an American art historian, feminist, and activist.

== Life ==
Goldman grew up in New York City and moved to Los Angeles after World War II. Her parents, a trade unionist mother and a political activist father came from Poland and Russia and both exposed Goldman to art and politics at an early age.

Goldman went to the High School of Music and Art in New York. When her family moved to Los Angeles, Goldman enrolled at the University of California, Los Angeles (UCLA). During her time there, she became involved in civil rights. She took part in the student boycott against barbers in Westwood who would not cut the hair of Black veterans. Goldman did not finish her degree at this time; instead she chose to dedicate herself to civil rights for Mexican-Americans. She lived in East Los Angeles, where she learned to speak Spanish and in 1952 married John Garcia.

Her marriage to Garcia lasted a short time and later she had another brief marriage. For some time, Goldman worked in a factory and then as a bookkeeper to support herself and her son, Eric Garcia. During this time, she continued to be a civil rights activist and was subpoenaed to appear at the panel of the House Un-American Activities Committee; she did not answer any of their questions.

In the 1960s she returned to UCLA to complete her B.A. in art. Goldman received a M.A. in art history from California State University, Los Angeles (1966)and returned to UCLA to get her PhD in art history in 1977. When Goldman chose her doctoral topic for her PhD, she had to wait several years for a faculty member to approve her choice of modern Mexican Art.

She taught at Santa Ana College, until 1992.

She helped save the "America Tropical" mural, by David Alfaro Siqueiros.

Goldman maintained a sizable collection of archival material relating to art and artists which she donated to the California Ethnic and Multicultural Archives at UC Santa Barbara.

She died in Los Angeles from Alzheimer's disease.

== Works ==
- Mexican muralism: its social-educative roles in Latin America and the United States, Institute of Latin American Studies, University of Texas, Austin, 1980
- Contemporary Mexican Painting in a Time of Change 1981; University of New Mexico Press, 1995, ISBN 978-0-8263-1562-5
- Dimensions of the Americas: Art and Social Change in Latin America and the United States. University of Chicago Press. 1994. ISBN 978-0-226-30124-2.
- Shifra M. Goldman, Tomás Ybarra-Frausto (eds) Arte Chicano: a comprehensive annotated bibliography of Chicano art, 1965-1981, Chicano Studies Library Publications Unit, University of California, 1985, ISBN 978-0-918520-09-8

== Quotes ==
"I was never in the mainstream, never in all my life. I was born on the margins, lived on the margins, and have always sympathized with the margins. They make a lot more sense to me than the mainstream."
