= Charlotte Streifer Rubinstein =

American art historian

Charlotte Streifer Rubinstein (December 14, 1921 – November 7, 2013) was an American teacher of art and art history and an early innovator in the teaching of women-in-art history courses. She was born to Lillian Kaufman and Aaron Streifer in Harlem, New York, and moved to Brooklyn shortly thereafter.

== Education ==
Her art education began with exploring the various art museums in her hometown of Brooklyn, followed by training with Works Progress Administration (WPA) artists during President Franklin D. Roosevelt's New Deal programs during the Great Depression. She received a BA degree in art from Hunter College in 1941, Master of Fine Arts degree in Print-making and Design from the Otis-Parsons Art Institute and the Master of Arts degree in Art and Education from the Teachers College of Columbia University.

== Women, USA ==
In 1973, with the support of a grant from the National Endowment of the Arts, she organized an all-media show of contemporary women artists, entitled, Women, USA.

== Publications ==
She is the author of three books;

- American Women Artists: From Early Indian Times to the Present, published in 1982 by G. K. Hall & Co., Boston, Mass., ISBN 978-0-8161-8535-1

Chosen at the "Best Humanities Book of 1982 in the Scholarly and Professional Category" by the Association of American Publishers.

- American Women Sculptors: A History of Women Working in Three Dimensions, 1990 by the same as above. TSBN:9780816187324
- Angie Bray:Glimpses by C. S. Rubenstein, Sue Spaid and Suvan Geer, 2000 by Fresno Art Museum. ISBN 9780932325440,

== Personal life ==
From an early age Rubenstein was interested and involved in political causes and action. As a teenager she was involved in the attempt to improve the lot of Jews fleeing Nazi persecution and as an adult was involved in protests against both McCarthyism and the Vietnam War.

She made her home in Laguna Beach, California with her husband and three children. Rubinstein died in November 2013 at the age of 91.
