= Bernice Steinbaum =

American gallerist and curator

- Born: 1941 (age 84–85); Flushing, NY
- Education: BA, Queens College, 1961. MA, Hofstra University, 1965. PhD in Art Education, Columbia University, 1977
- Occupations: Gallerist, art dealer, curator
- Years active: 1977 to present
- Known for: Feminist art, multicultural art
- Spouse: Harold Steinbaum
- Children: Jeremy, Sarah, Carrie
- Awards: Women's Caucus for Art Lifetime Achievement Award, 2012; Woman of Year National Organization for Women, 1988

Bernice Steinbaum is an American gallerist and curator who founded the Bernice Steinbaum Gallery in New York City in 1977. She has shown under-represented work ranging from women artists, feminist artists, civil-rights artists and artists of color. Inspired by the lack of changing curriculum in the 1960s Steinbaum went on to receive her PhD in Art Education from Columbia University and established galleries for women and people of color.

== Early life ==
Steinbaum was born January 3, 1941 in Flushing, New York to Julius Dov and Sarah (Lasker) Aptowitz. Her father, who was a Rabbi died when she was eight. She was one of five children. As a young woman she started to notice what wasn't being taught in the art academy, which included female artists and artists of color she represents. She spent Saturdays and Sundays at the Metropolitan Museum of Art or the MoMA in Manhattan. Steinbaum received her Bachelor's at Queens College in 1961 then attended Hofstra University and received her Master's in 1965. Steinbaum taught Art History in the 1960s and later resigned due to the fact that the curriculum had not changed in years. She then went on to pursue a PhD in Art Education from Columbia University in 1977.

== Career ==
Steinbaum showed the work of women artists, feminist artists, civil-rights artists and artists of color at a time when they were under-represented and undervalued in the art world. Her Madison Avenue, and later SoHo, Manhattan galleries exhibited 50% women and 40% artists of color. In 2000, she moved the gallery to Miami, Florida and focused on artists working with environmental art themes for fourteen years. She founded the Wynwood Arts District in Miami, Florida when she turned a run down crack house into her two-story gallery. A documentary film was made on Steinbaum by filmmaker, Kristina Sorge describing the artists she represented who were faced with the racial and gender inequities of the art world of the time. In 1988, Steinbaum was awarded the woman of the year National Organization for Woman. Steinbaum was also awarded the national Women's Caucus for Art Lifetime Achievement Award in 2012.

== Bernice Steinbaum Gallery ==
The Bernice Steinbaum Gallery was founded in New York City, New York in 1977. The Civil Rights Movement and Feminism had evoked change, but women and people of color still were undervalued and underrepresented in the art world. Steinbaum's mission was to exhibit artists, maintaining a roster of 50% women, and 40% artists of color. The gallery opened on Madison Avenue, New York in 1977 and later moved to 132 Green St. in SoHo. Steinbaum moved the gallery to Miami, Florida in 2000. Steinbaum's was the first commercial gallery in the undeveloped area of Wynwood. From the new location in Wynwood, Steinbaum's mission for the gallery changed. Steinbaum turned her attention to the future of the natural world and the threats to it that human endeavors pose. She searched for artists that were engaging in environmental themes and working with found materials. Some artists that she has shown include Aurora Molina, Carola Bravo, Patrick Jacobs, Maria Magdalena Campos, and Beverly McIver.
