= Gladys Barker Grauer =

American artist and activist

- Born: August 15, 1923; Cincinnati, Ohio, U.S.
- Died: September 5, 2019 (aged 96); Newark, New Jersey, U.S.
- Education: Art Institute of Chicago
- Occupations: Artist; activist
- Website: gladysbarkergrauer.org

Gladys Barker Grauer (August 15, 1923 – September 5, 2019) was an American artist and activist. In 1971, she opened the first art gallery in Newark, New Jersey. She was known as the "matriarch of Newark arts."

== Early life ==
Gladys Barker was born in Cincinnati, Ohio on August 15, 1923, to Maudie and Charlie Barker. She grew up on the South Side of Chicago. Her mother did not want her to spend her free time on the streets, so Barker spent her time in art museums. An art supervisor visiting her school singled her out for praise, inspiring her future career.

Barker attended Englewood High School (Chicago, IL) and later graduated from the School of the Art Institute of Chicago.

In 1946, Grauer moved to New York to join the arts scene and became involved with the Socialist Workers Party. She met her husband, a white, Jewish man named Solomon Grauer, at a rally when he grabbed her before a horseback police officers could direct the horse to kick at the protestors. They married in 1947, when their interracial marriage would have been controversial.

The Grauers moved to Newark's South Ward in 1951, where they raised four children. They fought to desegregate the ward's schools and bring a community dental center to the neighborhood. In 1960, Grauer ran for U.S. Senate under the socialist slate.

== Art career ==
In 1971, Grauer opened the Aard Studio Gallery, the first art gallery in Newark. The location drew artists of color from all over the state. Grauer later co-founded the "Black Woman in Visual Perspective," an organization promoting women in the arts. She co-founded the New Jersey Chapter of the National Conference of Artists and the Newark Arts Council.

Barker became a commercial art teacher for the Essex County Vocational Schools and retired in 1989. In her retirement, she taught art to seniors and continued making her own art. She worked as an artist in residence, workshop leader and lecturer.

She was also considered the "mother of the mural movement in Newark," completing five murals between 2006 and her death in 2019.

== Death and legacy ==
Congressional record honoring Gladys Barker Grauer

A film about Grauer, Being Gladys, won best documentary at the Newark International Film Festival in 2019.

Grauer died on September 5, 2019. That same year, a mural, Magnitude and Bond featuring Grauer watching over the community and Breya Knight as a warrior, with imagery and symbolism representing their contributions to the Newark arts and poetry community. The mural was created by Womb of Violet, a collective of Newark Black women and artists, Kelley Prevard, and Layqa Nuna Yawar.
