= Theresa Kane =

American Catholic religious sister (1936–2024)

Sister Theresa Kane

Personal life
- Born: Margaret Joan Kane; September 24, 1936
- Died: 22 August 2024 (aged 87)

Religious life
- Religion: Christianity
- Denomination: Catholic Church
- Institute: Sisters of Mercy
- Profession: 1960 (perpetual vows)

Theresa Kane RSM (née Margaret Joan Kane; September 24, 1936 – August 22, 2024) was an American Mercy Sister, who held heterodox opinions regarding the ordination of women within the Catholic Church.

== Biography ==
One of seven children born to Irish migrants to the United States, Kane grew up in The Bronx, New York. She entered the novitiate of the Sisters of Mercy at their convent in Tarrytown, New York, in September 1955, taking the religious name Theresa. She made her first profession in 1957, and professed perpetual vows in 1960. Despite her disagreement with some of the Catholic Church's teaching, she remained a member of the church until her death.

Kane attended Manhattanville College, graduating with a Bachelor of Arts (BA) degree in economics in 1959. She first worked as the finance manager of St. Francis Hospital in Port Jervis, New York, and before becoming its administrator in 1964. In 1992, she was appointed administrator of Mercy College (later Mercy University), and she was made an associate professor of behavioral sciences in 1996.

She rose to become president of the Religious Sisters of Mercy of the Union, and then later also the president of the Leadership Conference of Women Religious (LCWR), which then represented more than 130,000 American nuns and religious sister.

During Pope John Paul II's visit to the United States in 1979, she was chosen to give the greeting to him from the pulpit of the Basilica of the National Shrine of the Immaculate Conception in Washington, D.C.. As part of her short, televised address, she stated: "the Church in its struggle to be faithful to its call for reverence and dignity for all persons must respond by providing the possibility of women as persons being included in all ministries of our Church". Roughly half of the congregation formed from 5,000 nuns applauded her words, with the others sitting in silent disagreement. In addition to her belief that women should be ordained, she was a feminist and "among the first prominent church figures to champion L.G.B.T.Q. Catholics".

Kane died on August 22, 2024, aged 87. Her funeral Mass was held at the Church of the Transfiguration in Tarrytown, New York, on September 3, celebrated by Fr Charles Curran, another controversial minister famous for his attacks against the teachings of his own Church.
