= Leslie King-Hammond =

American artist, curator and art historian

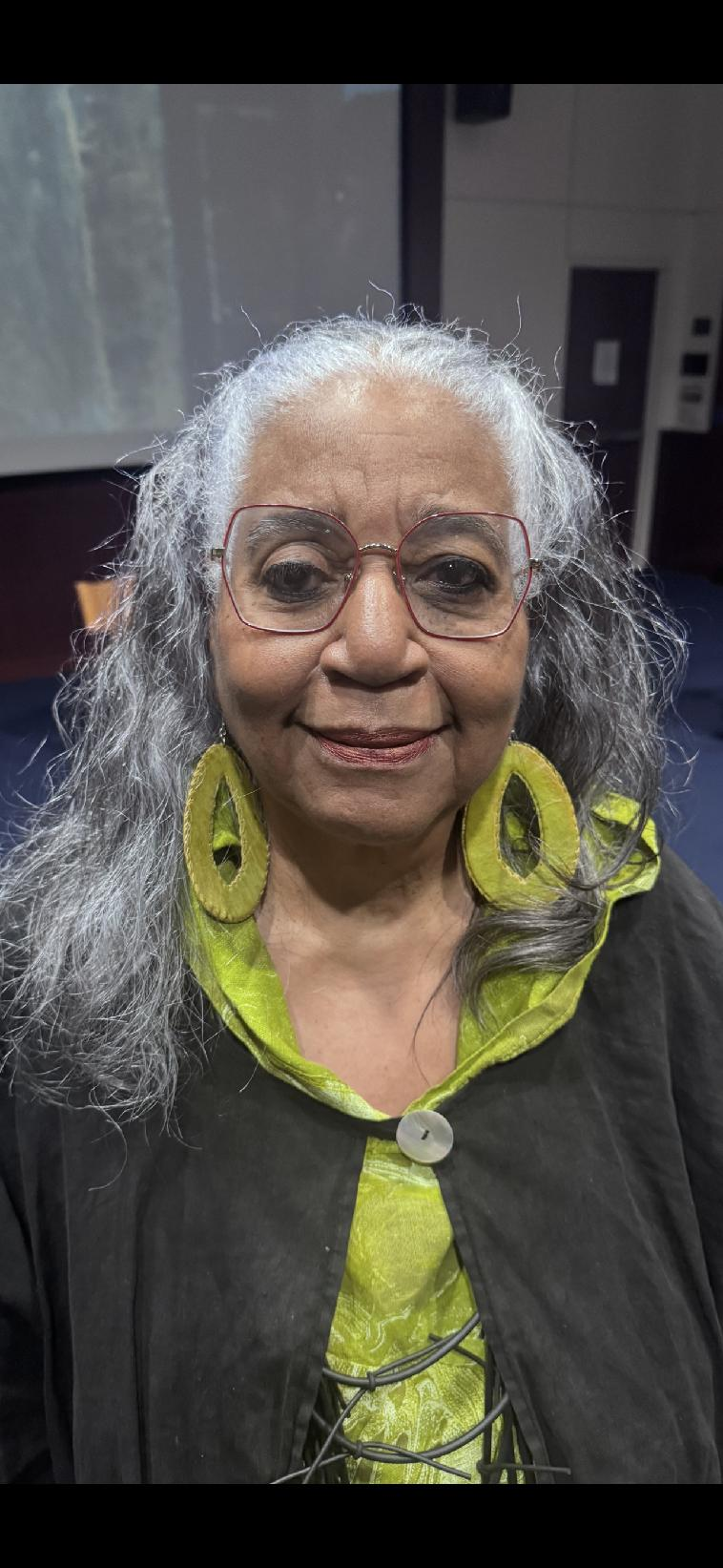
- King-Hammond at the 2026 African Diaspora International Film Festival.
- Born: 1944 (age 81–82); South Bronx, NY, U.S.
- Education: BFA, City University of New York, Queens College; MA, PhD, Johns Hopkins University
- Occupations: Artist, curator, and art historian
- Known for: Founding Director of the Center for Race and Culture at the Maryland Institute College of Art

Leslie King-Hammond (born 1944) is an American artist, curator and art historian who is the Founding Director of the Center for Race and Culture at the Maryland Institute College of Art, where she is also Graduate Dean Emeritus.

== Biography ==
King-Hammond received a BFA degree from the City University of New York, Queens College, and a PhD in art history from Johns Hopkins University. She is chair of the board of the Reginald F. Lewis Museum of Maryland African American History & Culture. Hammond has curated several exhibitions, including the Global Africa Project, that was co-organized with Lowery Stokes Sims, Ph.D., Charles Bronfman International Curator at New York City's Museum of Arts and Design.

In explaining her role and her work, King-Hammond has said:

The intent of my professional activities in the art world at large has centered on facilitating the means to get artists of color and women more ideally represented in the larger arena... My efforts have focused on the redefinition of history as it more correctly profiles the role of the artists in America.

King-Hammond has interviewed other notable artists including Joyce J. Scott. The educator Lawrence Rinder conducted research on art and design from leading schools and spotlights the importance of education, the field of study and instructors and notes King-Hammond. Dr. King-Hammond was also noted as an expert in an article written by Blake Gopnik in The Washington Post.

== Awards, honors ==
King-Hammond was awarded the Kress Fellowship in 1974, a competitive fellowship given to curators and historians at the beginning of their careers. While at the Maryland Institute College for Art, King Hammond earned the Trustee Award for Excellence in Teaching in 1986. She received Mellon Grants for faculty research in 1988, 1989, and 2005. She was awarded a Lifetime Achievement Award from the Studio Museum in Harlem (NYC) in 2002; an artist grant from the National Endowment for the Arts in 2001, an Andy Warhol Foundation curatorial fellowship in 2008, and the Alain Locke International Prize in 2010.

== Bibliography ==
- King-Hammond, Leslie; Khrushcheva, Nina; Paca, Barbara (2015). Ruth Star Rose (1887-1965): Revelations of African American Life in Maryland and the World.
- King-Hammond, Leslie (2013). Ashe to amen : African Americans and biblical imagery.
- King-Hammond, Leslie; Sims, Lowery Stokes (2010). The Global Africa Project.
- King-Hammond, Leslie (2010). Hughie Lee-Smith.
- King-Hammond, Leslie; Lawrence, Jacob; Payson, John Whitney (2006). Anxious objects : Willie Cole's favorite brands.
- King-Hammond, Leslie; Andreas, George (2001). George Andreas : works on paper.
- King-Hammond, Leslie (2000). Over the Line: The Art and Life of Jacob Lawrence.
- King-Hammond, Leslie (1995). Gumbo Ya Ya: An Anthology of Contemporary African American Women Artists. New York: Midmarch Arts press. ISBN 9781877675072.
- King-Hammond, Leslie; Sims, Lowery Stokes; Sims, Patterson (1994). Jacob Lawrence, an overview : paintings from 1936-1994.
- King-Hammond, Leslie; Lorin, Elisabeth (1989). Black Printmakers and the W.P.A.
- King-Hammond, Leslie (1982). Ritual and Myth: A Survey of African American Art.

== Exhibitions ==
- Leslie King-Hammond (2004). Inner Being/Altered States: Painting the Life-Worlds of Beverly McIver's Realities in The Many Faces of Beverly McIver. 40 Acres Gallery.
- Leslie King-Hammond (2003). Aminah Robinson: Aesthetic Realities/Artistic Vision in The Art of Aminah Robinson. Columbus Museum of Art.
- Leslie King-Hammond (2003). Sugar and Spice: The Art of Bettye Saar. Michael Rosenfeld Gallery.
- Leslie King-Hammond (1998). Three Generations of African American Women Sculptors: A Study in Paradox. Center for African American History and Culture, Smithsonian Institution.
- Leslie King-Hammond (1996). African burial tradition in post modern America (VHS video). University of Cincinnati, College of Design, Architecture, Art & Planning.
- Leslie King-Hammond (1992). Masters, Mentors, and Makers. MICA Decker Gallery.
- Leslie King-Hammond (1991). The Black experience in American art : new age of discovery (VHS video). Visiting Black Scholars.
- Leslie King-Hammond (1988). Art as a Verb. MICA, Studio Museum in Harlem, and the Met Life Gallery.
