= Wanda M. Corn =

Art historian

Wanda Corn
- Education: Bates College; New York University
- Movement: American 19th & 20th Century Art
- Spouse: Joseph J. Corn

Wanda M. Corn is an American art and cultural historian.

Corn is a scholar of art and photography from the late 19th to mid-20th centuries. She is the Robert and Ruth Halperin Professor emerita of art history at Stanford University. She held the professorship for eight years before retiring from the university in March 2017. Over her career as an art professor at Stanford she brought John D. Rockefeller's personal collection to the Fine Arts Museums of San Francisco, which included a "a body of 110 paintings described as the museums’ “single most important gift of art." She served as acting director of the Stanford Art Museum now known as the Iris & B. Gerald Cantor Center for Visual Arts. Prior to her position at Stanford she held the Samuel H. Kress Professorship at the Center for Advanced Study in the Visual Arts, at the National Gallery of Art from 2006 to 2007.

== Early life and education ==
Corn attended Bates College in Lewiston, Maine, for two years, majoring in history from 1960 to 1962. There she met her future husband, Joe Corn. In 1962, she studied abroad in London, England, at the University of London where she enrolled in University College, the Slade School of Art and Birkbeck College. There she began her studies in art history with Nikolaus Pevsner. She said of the experience:

I had grown up next door to the Congregational church where my father was the minister, so I was very comfortable in churches, in England I was surrounded by all these marvelous cathedrals, and I went with Pevsner on field trips to take measurements and to try to discover the little seams that marked the places where one work period stopped and another picked up. He was an inspiration to me, and I fell in love with things medieval and thought that would be what I would spend my life doing.

After returning from London, Corn spent a year in Paris as an au pair for a small local family to learn the French necessary for her continued studies in art history. She later attended New York University for her bachelor's, master's, and doctorate degrees.

== Career in art ==
External videos
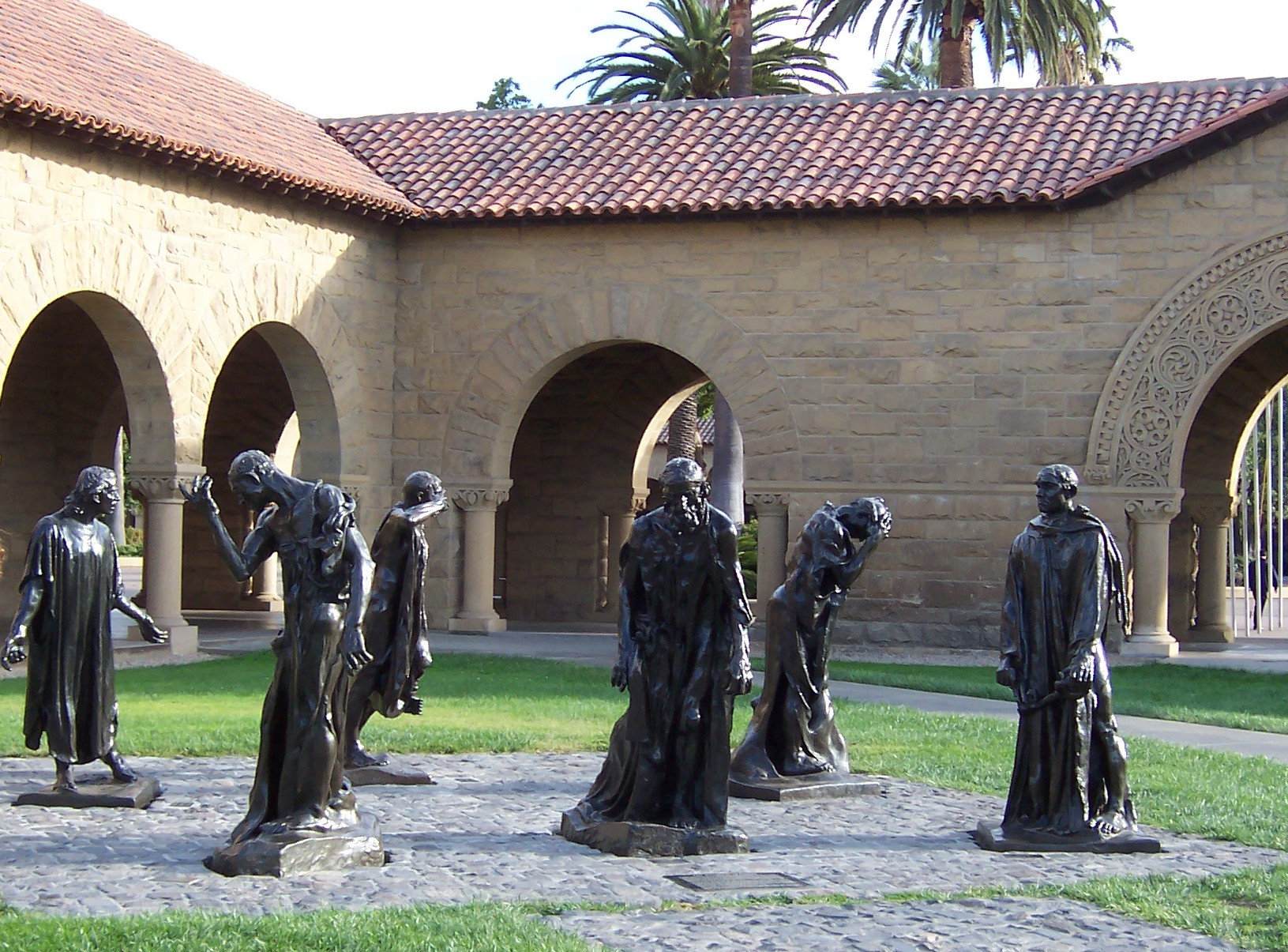
- Wanda Corn, "The Future of Museums"–Stanford University

After graduating from college, Corn taught at Washington Square College, the University of California, Berkeley, and Mills College. She was appointed the first full-time professor of American art at Stanford University in 1980. During her tenure at Stanford she served as chair of the departments of art and art history. She also served as the director of the Stanford Humanities Center before becoming acting director of the Stanford Museum of Art, now known as the Iris & B. Gerald Cantor Center for Visual Arts. After the 1989 Loma Pieta earthquake, she led the reconstruction of the museum after it had been badly damaged.

She held the Samuel H. Kress Professorship at the Center for Advanced Study in the Visual Arts at the National Gallery of Art from 2006 to 2007. In 2009, she was the John Rewald Distinguished Visiting Lecturer at the Graduate Center, City University of New York.

In 2013, Corn held a conference with Stanford Alumni Association, where she discussed modern society's definition of "fine arts" and what it means for the museum industry going further into the 21st century.

She retired from Stanford as the Robert and Ruth Halperin Professor in Art History.

== Personal life ==
Corn lives with her husband, Joe Corn, in Sagamore Beach, Massachusetts, in a home designed for them by the architectural firm Albert, Righter, and Tittmann, on a cliff overlooking Cape Cod Bay, on property owned by her family since the 1940's. They previously lived in Palo Alto, California, in a home they purchased from painter Sam Francis. Joe Corn is a historian of science and technology.

== Influence and legacy ==
Corn's contributions to art history, curation, and fashion have led her to be hailed as "a national resource [for art]", and "a star among historians of American art."

=== In art ===
Over her career as an art professor at Stanford she brought John D. Rockefeller's personal collection to the Fine Arts Museums of San Francisco, which included a "a body of 110 paintings described as the museums’ “single most important gift of art". During her curations of art her major subjects were the late 19th to mid-20th centuries movements in American visual art. Her show and book, The Great American Thing, "focused on specific artists such as Grant Wood, who remains an active focus of her research, Andrew Wyeth, and Georgia O'Keeffe, about whom she published a book in 2017. Her curations are known for "exhibitions that juxtapose material artifacts with art to establish context and richness of interpretation."

She pioneered the concept of "moderns": those who "began to claim the skyscrapers, billboards, brand-name products, factories, jazz, advertisements and even plumbing fixtures of the 1920s as identifiers of the new "Americanness."

=== Awards and honors ===
Corn has received many awards and honors for her research, including the 2014 Distinguished Scholar Award from the College Arts Association. In 2003–2004 she received a fellowship from the Radcliffe Institute for Advanced Study at Harvard University, where she pursued research on Gertrude Stein and the Making of the Modern. She received the Archives of American Art's Lawrence A. Fleischman Award for Scholarly Excellence in the Field of American Art History. In 2007 she received the Women's Caucus for Art Lifetime Achievement Award as well as the College Arts Association Distinguished Teaching of Art History Award. She received a fellowship at the Sterling and Francine Clark Art Institute in 2010; and a fellowship from the Georgia O'Keeffe Research Center in 2013. On May 28, 2017, she received an honorary doctorate from her alma mater, Bates College in Lewiston, Maine, for her contributions to art. In 2018 she was winner of the 2018 Dedalus Foundation Exhibition Catalogue Award.

== Selected works ==
Corn has written extensively on the subjects of art history and art curation. Some of her more prominent works include:

- The Art of Andrew Wyeth (1973)
- Grant Wood: The Regionalist Vision (1983)
- The Great American Thing: Modern Art and National Identity, 1915–1935, University of California Press (1999)
- Women Building History: Public Art at the 1893 Columbian Exposition, University of California Press (2011)
- Georgia O'Keeffe: Living Modern (2017)
