= Joyce Fernandes =

Afro-Brazilian rapper and activist

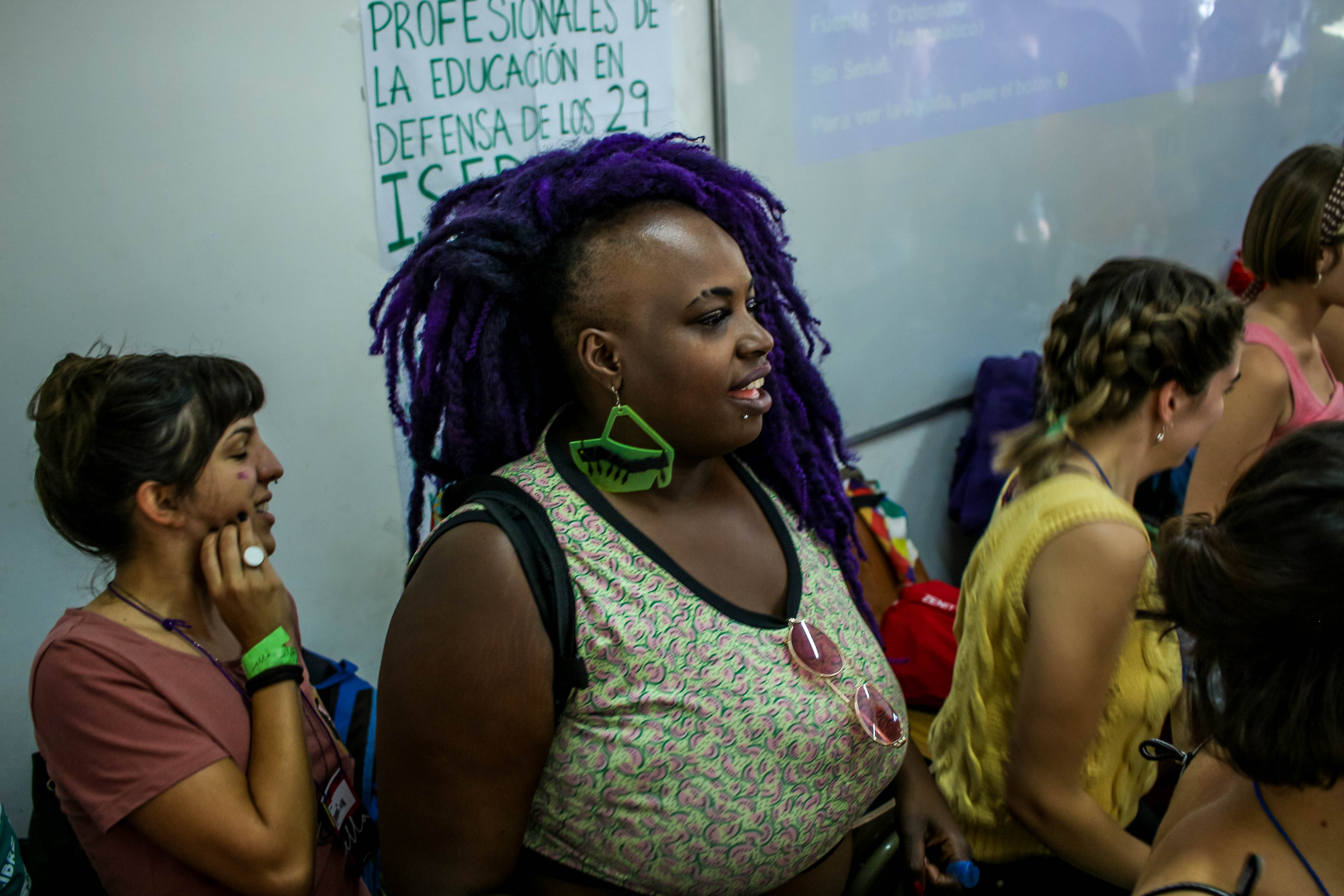
- Fernandes at the 3rd Latin American and Caribbean Feminist Encuentros in 2018
- Born: Joyce da Silva Fernandes; May 13, 1985 (age 41); Santos, São Paulo, Brazil
- Occupations: Rapper; TV host; activist
- Employer: TV Globo

Joyce da Silva Fernandes (born May 13, 1985), also known as Preta Rara, is an Afro-Brazilian rapper, activist, and television host. A former maid, her work in internet activism against the subordination of domestic workers led to a book that recorded first-person accounts of abuse. This work also extends to racial discrimination and sizeism.

== Early life and education ==
Fernandes was born in 1985 to Maria Helena da Silva Fernandes, a former maid, and a father who works as a postman, and is the eldest of two sisters and an adopted brother. She grew up in Santos, São Paulo.

Working as a maid, she obtained a degree in history in 2012, and found work as a high school history teacher.

== Music career ==
In 2005, Fernandes adopted the stage name Preta Rara when she co-founded Tarja Preta, one of the first female rap groups in Santos. Before dissolving in October 2013, the group played several shows nationwide and won several awards in São Paulo. In March 2015, she released her debut solo album Audácia, which addressed racism and the subordination of black women in Brazil.

== Activism ==
In June 2016, Fernandes began documenting anecdotes of abuse from her work as a maid on Facebook. Under the hashtag #I’mAMaid, her post prompted many others to respond. Her Facebook page "Eu Empregada Doméstica" rapidly gained more than 100,000 followers. In 2019, Fernandes published her book Empregada Doméstica, which accounted other maids' stories, including her mothers'.

In 2020, she became a host on the Talk Five program on the TV Globo television network.
