= Joyce Treiman =

American painter (1922–1991)

- Self portrait
- Born: Joyce Wahl; May 29, 1922; Evanston, Illinois, US
- Died: June 2, 1991 (aged 69); Santa Monica, California, US
- Known for: Painting

Joyce Wahl Treiman (May 29, 1922 – June 2, 1991) was an American painter. Her work ranged from "the impishly perverse and humorously paradoxical to the brilliant and profound." She was known as an excellent draftsperson throughout her career. She made several trips to Europe to study the old masters, and the human figure is central in her work. In her later paintings she is known to have inserted self-portraits.

== Life ==
Born to René and Rose Wahl in Evanston, Illinois, her parents recognized her creative talent early and enrolled her into a children’s art class. After a single class, the instructor referred Joyce to an adult class. In the opening sentence of her autobiographical essay she states: "I started drawing at age eight and knew then that what I really wanted was to make art. There was never any doubt although doubts happened along the way."

She attended Stephens College in Columbia, Missouri, and then studied at the State University of Iowa (today the University of Iowa) under the influential painter Philip Guston. During World War II she worked as a commercial artist but resigned when she began to have success with exhibitions of her work in Chicago and New York.

In 1945 she married Kenneth Treiman, and son Donald, now an architect, was born in 1950. The Treimans, along with Rene and Rose Wahl, moved to Los Angeles in 1960.

In 1983 Treiman was diagnosed with lung cancer. In this same year she had a very productive run and painted what are considered some of her greatest works, including Thanatopsis, Hercules and the Arcadian Stag, and The Parting. She made a full recovery from the cancer, and was productive until her death from a heart attack in June 1991.

Treiman's work is in the collection of numerous nationally recognized museums, including the Whitney Museum in New York, the Metropolitan Museum of Art in New York and the Los Angeles County Museum of Art. In 1996 her paintings and works on paper were exhibited posthumously at Louis Stern Fine Arts in West Hollywood.

Her painting Escape won the $500 Frank G Logan prize in the Art Institute of Chicago's Chicago and Vicinity exhibition of 1951.

She was interviewed on October 3, 1981 by Paul Karlstrom as part of the California Oral History Project for the Archives of American Art.
