= Marie Johnson-Calloway =

American artist (1920–2018)

Marie Edwards Johnson–Calloway
- Born: Marie Edwards; April 10, 1920; Pimlico, Baltimore, Maryland, United States
- Died: February 11, 2018 (aged 97); Oakland, California, United States
- Other name: Marie Edwards Johnson
- Education: Coppin State University, Morgan State College (BA), San Jose State University (MA)
- Occupations: Artist, educator, activist
- Known for: Black portraiture, painting, sculpture, mixed-media assemblage
- Spouse(s): Arthur Johnson (m. ?–1973; divorced); Charles Fisher Calloway (m. 1979–2011; his death)
- Children: 2

Marie Johnson-Calloway (née Marie Edwards; April 10, 1920 – February 11, 2018), was an American artist, educator and activist. She worked in the fields of painting, sculpture, and mixed-media assemblage, and is known for her Black portraiture. She taught at San Francisco State University, from 1959 until 1984.

== Early life and education ==
Marie Johnson-Calloway was born as Marie Edwards on April 10, 1920, in Pimlico, Baltimore, Maryland. Her parents were African-American, Marie (a seamstress and artist) and Sidney Edwards (a minister). She attended Douglass High School in Baltimore.

Johnson-Calloway first attended Coppin State Teacher's College in Baltimore, Maryland. In 1952, she received a Bachelor of Arts degree at Morgan State College, Baltimore, Maryland, in art education. In 1968, she received a Master of Arts degree in painting from San Jose State University, as a Graduate Studies Experienced Teacher Fellow. She also obtained a Graduate Studies Fellowship at Stanford University. In 1976, she was approved for a Doctoral Equivalency at San Francisco State University.

== Career ==
Johnson-Calloway taught at San Francisco State University (SFSU), from 1959 until 1984, where she was professor emeritus; and at the California College of Arts and Crafts in Oakland.

Johnson-Calloway's works focused on the portraiture of Black individuals. She worked with the Northern California Women's Caucus for Art (NCWCA) on community-based projects. The Oakland Museum of California, is among institutions which contain examples of her work in the collection.

She served as president of the San Jose chapter of the NAACP, and was long active in civil rights.

In 1965–66, she won the first award at the San Jose Art League Center for the Visual Arts (formerly the San Jose Art League) semi-annual. In 1968, she won the Purchase Award for Black Arts Today at San Jose State College in San Jose, California. In 1969, she won the Purchase Award from the San Francisco Art Commission. In 1971, she won First Award for mixed media at the San Jose Art League's Regional Show.

She was twice-married to Dr. Arthur Johnson, and to Dr. Charles Fisher Calloway, and she had 2 children.

== Death ==
Johnson-Calloway died in February 2018 at the age of 97.
