= Women in the art history field =

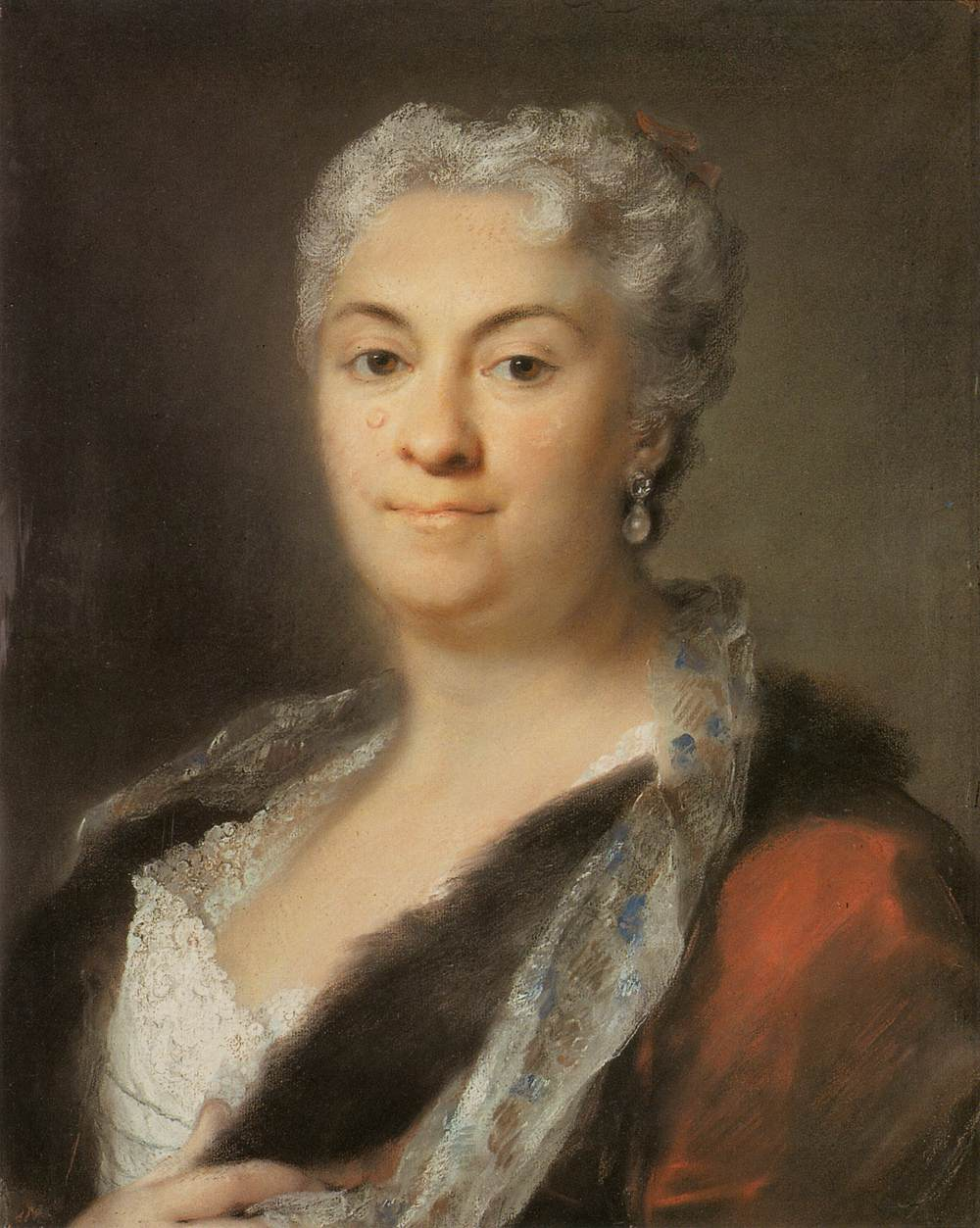
Elderly Lady (circa 1740), painting by Rosalba Carriera

Women were professionally active in the academic discipline of art history in the nineteenth century and participated in the important shift early in the century that began involving an "Emphatically Corporeal Visual Subject", with Vernon Lee as a notable example. It is argued that in the twentieth century women art historians (and curators), by choosing to study women artists, "dramatically" "increased their visibility". It has been written that women artists pre-1974 were historically one of two groups; women art historians and authors who self-consciously address high school audiences through the publication of textbooks. The relative "newness" of this field of study for women, paired with the possibility of interdisciplinary focus, emphasizes the importance of visibility of all global women in the art history field.

== Education and employment ==
In the United States professional, academic employment for women art historians was, by the early 1970s, not commensurate with the number of female PhDs in art history. Between 1960 and 1969, 30.1% of PhDs were awarded to women but those numbers increased significantly during that period: between 1960 and 1965 it was 27%, but between 1966 and 1967 it had gone up to 43.5%. But in 1970–1971, women art historians in art departments in the US made up 23.1% of instructors, 21.6% of assistant professors, 17.5% of associate professors, and only 11.1% of full professors. Comparison with the numbers for the same years for women in the languages, from a study done by the Modern Language Association, showed that "women in C.A.A. [College Art Association] professions face[d] rather more severe discrimination than women in M.L.A. fields". Similar tendencies were reported for salary and employment in studio teaching ("preliminary statistics...indicate that women artists receive a disproportionately small share of full-time studio jobs") and in museums ("particularly significant was a tendency to hire women with BAs to be secretaries and men with BAs for trainee programs which rapidly advanced them to more challenging positions").

The history of women in the profession also suggests that art education itself has benefited from the increased presence of professional women art historians, since women students sometimes found it necessary to "redo" an education in which only a male point of view had been provided given. Paula Harper, "one of the first art historians to bring a feminist perspective to the study of painting and sculpture", and Moira Roth shared the same experience of a "one-sided training", of feeling left out. Discrimination against "women in college and university art departments and art museums" was, in the early 1970s, the immediate cause for the foundation of the Women's Caucus for Art (see below).

In a statistical study of US employment among art faculties published in 1977, Sandra Packard notes that "in art departments women have been decreasing in number since the 1930s", and that the number of women in art faculties at institutes of higher education "decreas[ed] from 22% in 1963 to a low of 19.5% in 1974", and cites statistics suggesting that "although women are concentrated at the lower ranks in art faculties, they have more Ph.D. degrees than their male colleagues."

== Representation ==
- The Women's Caucus for Art (WCA), a caucus for woman art historians, artists, and curators was founded at the 1972 meeting of the College Art Association (CAA), but re-established itself as an independent organization in 1974 after the CAA told them they could not use the CAA name anymore. According to Judith Brodsky, the CAA was, at the time, very much a male-dominated organization; she notes, though, in a 1977 article, that the Caucus is given space and time at the annual CAA conference and in the CAA's journal, Art Journal. A Lifetime Achievement Award was installed in 1979. The organization's objectives include "providing women with leadership opportunities and professional development" and "expanding networking and exhibition opportunities for women", and to that purpose publishes a newsletter, organizes sessions at conferences, and runs databases for "art and activism". In 2012 the WCA celebrated its 40th anniversary, and published a pamphlet for the annual awards ceremony that also includes a number of historical essays and reflections from the past presidents.
- The Committee on Women in the Arts (CWA) operates under the auspices of the College Art Association and advocates for feminist scholarship. Each year the committee awards a "Distinguished Feminist Award".
- In 2019, journalist Mona Chalabi completed a study on United States museums and diversity, finding that in 18 major museums the art collections are represented by 85% white and 87% male artists. Many United States museums (such as the National Portrait Gallery) have pledged in recent years to increase diversity in their art collections and in hires. As a result, a new generation of women art historians, many of which are also women of color, have joined leading institutions.

== Women art historians and feminist art theory ==
Feminist scholars have argued that the role of women art historians is connected to the study of women (as artists and as subjects) by art historians. In 1974, Lise Vogel noted that there were few feminist art historians, and that women art historians in general seemed unwilling to ask "the more radical critiques" a feminist scholar should engage in. In a 1998 essay, Corine Schleif argued that women and feminist scholars need to challenge the "Great Master" canon, and that they need to focus less on "style as evidence of authorship", seen as a traditionally masculine way of viewing the history of art, but rather on style as "one of many sites on the production of meaning". The topic of women scholars in art history is thus intricately connected with what scholars have called feminist art theory; Kerry Freedman, for example, claims that "women art historians often interpret art that is about and by women differently than their male colleagues". However, Carol Armstrong and Catherine de Zegher, in Women artists at the millennium (2006), argue that by the 1980s many "women art history scholars" had begun to think of feminism as irrelevant to the discipline.

== Notable women art historians ==
| Name | Nationality | Birth date | Specialization | Profession |
|---|---|---|---|---|
| Phyllis Ackerman | American | 1893–1977 | Persian art, Chinese art, textiles, tapestries | Co-founder of Asia Institute, author, interior design |
| Leeza Ahmady | Afghani-American | b. 1972 | Central Asian art, diaspora art | Independent curator and director of Asia Contemporary Art Week |
| Maryan Ainsworth | American | | 14th, 15th and 16th century Northern European painting, particularly in Early Netherlandish painting | Kress-Beinecke Professor at the Center for Advanced Study in the Visual Arts (CASVA) at the National Gallery in Washington DC. She is also a curator of European paintings at the Metropolitan Museum of Art, New York. |
| Svetlana Alpers | American | b. 1936 | Dutch Golden Age Painting | Art historian |
| Mouza Sulaiman Mohamed Al-Wardi | Oman | | Silversmithing from Oman | Director of the Collections Department at the National Museum (Oman). |
| Amalia Amaki | American | b. 1949 | American art | Artist, Professor of Modern and Contemporary Art at the University of Alabama at Tuscaloosa from 2007 to 2012. |
| Clementina Anstruther-Thomson | Scottish | 1857–1921 | Experimental aesthetics during the Victorian era | Author, art theorist, art critic |
| Paola Antonelli | Italian | b. 1963 | Modern Art, design | Curator |
| Irina Antonova | Soviet, Russian | 1922–2020 | Impressionist art, modern art | Director of the Pushkin Museum in Moscow from 1961 to 2013. |
| Mildred Archer | English | 1911–2005 | 18th- and 19th-century art in British India | |
| Carol Armstrong | American | | 19th-century art in France, photography | Art historian |
| Caroline Arscott | English | | Victorian art, 19th century art | Art historian |
| Muqadamma Ashrafi | Tajikistani | 1936–2013 | Medieval arts and painting of Central Asia | Author, researcher |
| Dore Ashton | American | 1928–2017 | Modern Art, contemporary Art | Writer, professor, art critic |
| Pamela Askew | American | 1925–1997 | Domenico Fetti and Caravaggio | Professor |
| Nurhan Atasoy | Turkish | b. 1934 | Ottoman art and architecture | Art historian |
| Erna Auerbach | German | 1897–1975 | Tudor period in England, feminist art | Author |
| Myrtilla Avery | American | 1869–1959 | Medieval art | Professor, a Monuments men, former chair of Department of Art at Wellesley College and director of the Farnsworth Art Museum from 1930 to 1937. |
| Sussan Babaie | Iranian | b. 1954 | Persian art, Islamic art of the early modern period | Professor at The Courtauld Institute of Art, art historian, writer |
| Julie Oeming Badiee | American | 1947 – 2001 | Islamic art, Baháʼí | Professor and department chair at Western Maryland College (now McDaniel College) |
| Barbara Baert | Belgian | b. 1967 | Medieval iconology | Art historian |
| Mieke Bal | Dutch | b. 1946 | Modern Art, Contemporary Art | Cultural theorist, video artist |
| Anna Banti | Italian | 1895–1985 | Italian Baroque, female artists | Writer, art historian, art critic, translator |
| Luisa Banti | Italian | 1894–1978 | Etruscan art | Archaeologist, art historian, writer |
| Jeannine Baticle | French | 1920–2014 | Spanish art | Former Honorary Deputy Director and Chief Curator of the Department of Paintings of the Louvre museum. |
| Ruth Barnes | English | b. 1956 | Material culture, South and Southeast Asian Textiles | Art historian, curator |
| Leila Cook Barber | American | 1903–1984 | Renaissance art and Medieval art | Art historian, professor of art history at Vassar College. |
| Wendy Beckett (aka 'Sister Wendy') | English | 1930–2018 | Catholic art | Art historian, Catholic nun |
| Ellen Beer | Swiss | 1926–2004 | Medieval art | Art historian, professor |
| Lottlisa Behling | German | 1909–1989 | Medieval art | Art historian, professor |
| Mary Berenson | American | 1864–1945 | Italian Renaissance | Art historian, lecturer |
| Laurence Bertrand Dorléac | French | b. 1957 | Modern and contemporary | Art historian, professor, curator |
| Rosemary Betterton | English | b. 1951 | Feminism and contemporary art | Art historian, professor, author |
| Margarete Bieber | German | 1879–1978 | Theatre, sculpture, and clothing of ancient Rome and Greece | Art historian, professor |
| Erika Billeter | German, Swiss | 1927–2011 | Latino art, contemporary art | Curator, writer, museum director at the Cantonal Museum of Fine Arts. |
| Gertrud Bing | German | 1892–1964 | Classical tradition | Director of the Warburg Institute |
| Shirley Neilsen Blum | American | b. 1932 | Northern Renaissance art, early Netherlandish art, and modern art. | Art historian, author, gallerist, co-founder of Ferus Gallery, and professor emeritus at the State University of New York, Purchase (1970–1989). |
| Phyllis Pray Bober | American | 1920–2002 | Renaissance art, classical antiquity, culinary history | Author, professor emerita at Bryn Mawr College. |
| Jean Sutherland Boggs | Canadian | b. 1922 | Nineteenth-century French art, Degas | Curator, art historian, and first female director of the National Gallery of Canada |
| Alice Boner | Swiss | 1889–1981 | Indian symbols in art history | Art historian focused on symbols in Indian art, also an artist |
| Evelina Borea | Italian | b. 1931 | Italian art history | Author, curator |
| Norma Broude | American | b. 1941 | Impressionism and feminist art history | Art historian, Author and emerita professor at American University |
| Frances Borzello | English | | Feminist art history including; social history of art, female portraiture, and female nudes. | Author, scholar, feminist art critic |
| Adelyn Dohme Breeskin | American | 1896–1986 | Mary Cassatt | Curator, museum director, and art historian at Baltimore Museum of Art |
| Anita Brookner | English | b. 1936 | Jean-Baptiste Greuze, Jacques-Louis David | Author, Slade professor of fine art at Cambridge University, her early work focused on art history and later work was fiction novels |
| Lillian Browse | English | 1906–2005 | Augustus John, Edgar Degas, James Dickson Innes | Art dealer, art historian |
| Coosje van Bruggen | Dutch, American | 1942–2009 | Dutch avant-garde art | Artist, art historian |
| Palma Bucarelli | Italian | 1910–1998 | avant-garde art | Director of the Galleria Nazionale d'Arte Moderna (GNAM) from 1942 to 1975, art critic |
| Anneliese Bulling | German, American | 1900–2004 | Sinologist, Chinese art and architecture | Art lecturer, art historian |
| Janine Burke | Australian | 1952– | Australian historical and contemporary art. | Honorary Senior Fellow, Faculty of Fine Arts and Music, University of Melbourne |
| Andrianna Campbell | American | | Nineteenth and twentieth-century American art, Norman Lewis, Abstract Expressionism | Art historian, curator |
| Taína Caragol | American | | Latino Art | Curator for Latino Art and History at the National Portrait Gallery, author |
| Teresa Gisbert Carbonell | Bolivian | b. 1926 | Andean art history | Art historian |
| María Luisa Caturla | Spanish | 1888–1984 | Spanish art history | art historian and collector, Trustee of the Museo del Prado |
| Mary Ann Caws | American | b. 1933 | Modern Art, contemporary art | Author, literary critic, art historian |
| Whitney Chadwick | American | b. 1943 | Feminist art critic, contemporary art, modernism, Surrealism, gender and sexuality | Author, Professor Emerita at San Francisco State University |
| Cathleen Chaffee | American | | contemporary art | Chief curator at Albright–Knox Art Gallery. |
| Sheng-Ching Chang | Taiwanese | b. 1963 | Chinese art history and cultural interactions | Professor at Fu Jen Catholic University, journalist, writer |
| Betty Churcher | Australian | 1931–2015 | | Art historian, first female director of the National Gallery of Australia |
| Lourdes Cirlot | Spanish | b. 1949 | Spanish and Catalan avant-garde art, 20-century art | |
| Alessandra Comini | American | b. 1934 | American women artists, Egon Schiele's portraiture | Academic lecturer, writer, a founder of the Women's Caucus for Art |
| Mildred Constantine | American | 1913–2008 | Poster Art, graphic design | Art historian and curator at Museum of Modern Art in the 1950s and 1960s |
| Lynne Cooke | Australian | b. 1952 | Modern art, contemporary art | Curator |
| Julie Crooks | Canadian | | | Curator, head of the department of Arts of Global Africa and the Diaspora at the Art Gallery of Ontario |
| Anne Crookshank | Irish | 1927–2016 | Irish painting | Professor emeritus at Trinity College Dublin. |
| Rosemary Crumlin | Australian | b. 1932 | Indigenous Australian art, religious art | Author, Sister of Mercy |
| Alissandra Cummins | Barbadian | b. 1958 | Caribbean art | Director of the Barbados Museum & Historical Society; lecturer in Museum and Heritage Studies at the University of the West Indies. |
| Parisa Damandan | Iranian | b. 1967 | 20th century Iranian photography | Author, historian |
| Mirella Levi D'Ancona | American, Italian | 1919–2002 | Symbolism and iconography in art from the Late Middle Ages period to the Renaissance | Professor emeritus at Hunter College, author, art historian. |
| Barbara Dawson | Irish | b. 1957 | Modern art | Director of the Hugh Lane Gallery, author, curator |
| Félicie d'Ayzac | French | 1801–1881 | Chartres Cathedral | Author, poet, archaeology, one of the first female art historians in France. |
| Cécile Debray | French | b. 1966 | modern painting, contemporary painting | Director of the Musée de l'Orangerie |
| Élisabeth Décultot | French | b. 1968 | Germanist, German Enlightenment | Literary scholar |
| Vidya Dehejia | Indian | | Indian and South Asian art | Professor of Indian and South Asian Art at Columbia University. |
| Rocio de la Villa | Spanish | b. 1959 | Spanish feminist art, contemporary art | Curator, university professor, president of Spanish Society of Aesthetics and Theory of the Arts, a co-founders of Asociación de Mujeres en las Artes Visuales (MAV) |
| Sirarpie Der Nersessian | Armenian | 1896–1989 | Armenian art, Byzantine art | Professor at Wellesley College, Harvard University, Dumbarton Oaks. |
| Laurence des Cars | French | b. 1966 | Pre-Raphaelites, English painting | Director of the Louvre Museum; former director of Musée d'Orsay, and Musée de l'Orangerie. |
| Yvonne Deslandres | French | 1923–1986 | Costume, adornment | |
| Catherine de Zegher | Belgium | b. 1955 | Contemporary art | Curator and art historian |
| Jasleen Dhamija | Indian | b. 1933 | Indian textile history, Indian craft history | Professor at University of Minnesota and National Institute of Fashion Technology. |
| Elisabeth Dhanens | Belgian | 1915–2014 | Early Netherlandish painting | Heritage official |
| Anne d'Harnoncourt | American | 1943–2008 | Marcel Duchamp | Curator and director of the Philadelphia Museum of Art |
| Kamala Dongerkery | Indian | 1909–1992 | Indian embroidery, Indian jewelry, Indian toys | Social worker, art historian, author, cultural historian |
| Saryu Doshi | Indian | | Indian miniature paintings, Jain art | Founding director of the National Gallery of Modern Art. |
| Layla S. Diba | Iranian, American | | 18th/19th-century and contemporary Persian art and the Qajar period | Iranian-American independent scholar and curator. |
| Leah Dickerman | American | | Modern art, Contemporary art | Curator, art historian |
| Emilia Dilke | English | 1840–1904 | 18th-century French art | Author, art historian, feminist and trade unionist. |
| Elizabeta Dimitrova | Macedonian | b. 1962 | Byzantinist, medievalists | |
| Lydia Durnovo | Soviet, Russian | 1885 –1963 | Russian painting, Armenian miniatures, Armenian frescoes | Staff of the National Gallery of Armenia |
| Sharada Dwivedi | Indian | 1942–2012 | Indian art and architecture history | Author of Indian and Mumbaiart and architecture history books |
| Shahin Ebrahimzadeh-Pezeshki | Iranian | b. 1958 | Persian traditional costume history, Iranian tribal costume history, tribal textile history, Persian embroidery history and craft | Author, curator, department head in a university |
| Mary Eagle | Australian | b. 1944 | art critic, curator and art historian | Curator, National Gallery of Australia, Head of Australian Art 1982–1996 |
| Ngarino Ellis | Māori | | Māori art history | Associate Professor at University of Auckland, has been the only Māori art historian employed at a New Zealand university. Author. |
| Irene Emery | American | 1900–1981 | Textile anthropologist | Author, curator of the Textile Museum |
| Helen Ennis | Australian | | Photography curator, historian, critic and biographer | Professor Emeritus and Fellow of the Australian Academy of the Humanities (2014). |
| Joan Evans | English | 1893–1977 | French and English mediaeval art | Art historian |
| Massumeh Farhad | American | | Islamic, Iranian, Turkish art history | Chief Curator and Curator of Islamic Art at the Freer Gallery of Art and Arthur M. Sackler Gallery at the Smithsonian Institution National Museum of Asian Art. |
| Constance Jocelyn Ffoulkes | British | 1858–1950 | Italian | Scholar, she participated in the adoption of a modernization of European methods of research. |
| Judith V. Field | British | b. 1943 | Geometrical art, mathematical art | Scholar, mathematician, research fellow in the Department of History of Art of Birkbeck, University of London |
| Margaret Henderson Floyd | American | 1932–1997 | Boston architecture including Henry Hobson Richardson, and Longfellow, Alden and Harlow. | Professor of Architectural History at Tufts University. |
| Marian Lopez Fernandez-Cao | Spanish | b. 1964 | Spanish feminist art, contemporary art, and the works of Sonia Delaunay | University professor and researcher, former president of Asociación de Mujeres en las Artes Visuales (MAV) |
| Lili Frohlich-Bume | Austrian | 1886–1981 | Italian Renaissance and Baroque paintings and drawings | |
| María Concepción García Gainza | Spanish | b. 1937 | Contemporary art, Spanish Renaissance | |
| Helen Gardner | American | 1878–1946 | | Author of Art Through the Ages, an art history textbook |
| Mary Garrard | American | b. 1940 | Italian Baroque art and feminist art history | Art historian, author, emerita professor at American University |
| Rona Goffen | American | 1944–2004 | Italian Renaissance art | Art historian and emerita professor at Rutgers University |
| Catherine Gonnard | French | b. 1958 | Women, gender and art | Art historian, journalist, writer, activist |
| Antje von Graevenitz | German | b. 1940 | 20th and 21st-century art | Art historian, art critic |
| Catherine Grenier | French | | Alberto Giacometti | Director of the Giacometti Foundation. |
| Tapati Guha-Thakurta | Indian | b. 1957 | Indian art of the 19th and 20th century | Professor at the Centre for Studies in Social Sciences, Calcutta. |
| Navina Najat Haidar | Indian, British | | Islamic art | Chief curator of Islamic art at the Metropolitan Museum of Art. |
| Paula Harper | American | 1930–2012 | Feminist art, Camille Pissarro, contemporary art | Art historian, art critic, art lecturer, author |
| Sharon Hecker | American, Italian | b. 1966 | Medardo Rosso, Lucio Fontana, exhibition histories, and contemporary art | Art historian, critic, curator, and art consultant |
| Liesbeth Heenk | Dutch | b. 1962 | Vincent van Gogh | |
| Hayden Herrera | American | b. 1940 | Frida Kahlo, Arshile Gorky, Joan Snyder | Art historian, author, foremost scholar on Kahlo. |
| Helen Hills | British | b 1960 | architecture and gender; female conventual architecture in southern Italy; social class and gender and religious devotion and visual art; the baroque south | Professor, curator, writer |
| Lubaina Himid | English | b. 1954 | Contemporary art, United Kingdom's Black Art movement | Professor, curator |
| Ursula Hoff | German, Australian | 1909–2005 | Australian art, the works of Rembrandt | Scholar, academic, curator, author, critic, and lecturer. Deputy Director of the National Gallery of Victoria, Melbourne (1968–1973); London Adviser of the Felton Bequest (1975–83). |
| Edith Hoffmann | Hungarian | 1888–1945 | Hungarian painter Miklós Barabás | Hungarian art historian and silhouette painter |
| Meike Hoffmann | German | b. 1962 | Die Brücke art movement, German art history | Provenance researcher, author |
| Stina Högkvist | Swedish | b. 1972 | | Curator, Director of Collections at National Museum, in Oslo, Norway |
| Candice Hopkins | Carcross/Tagish First Nation | b. 1977 | Indigenous art history | Independent curator, writer, and researcher. |
| Michael Ann Holly | American | | Historiography of art history | Art historian |
| Agnès Humbert | French | 1894–1963 | French art, Louis David, Henri Matisse | Art historian, ethnographer, and a member of the French Resistance during World War II. |
| Heather Igloliorte | Inuit | b. 1979 | Indigenous art history | |
| Irma B. Jaffe | American | 1917–2018 | Italian and American art history | Art historian, writer, founder and former chair of the Department of Fine Arts at Fordham University, former curator at the Whitney Museum of American Art |
| Alice Ming Wai Jim | Canadian | | Contemporary Asian art, contemporary Asian Canadian art, remix culture | Professor, art historian, curator |
| Kellie Jones | American | b. 1959 | African-American art and artists | Professor, curator, MacArthur Fellow |
| Amelia Jones | American | b. 1961 | Dada, Feminist art, Performance art, Body art | Art historian, art theorist, curator, author, university professor, art critic |
| Caroline A. Jones | American | b. 1954 | Modern and contemporary Art | Art historian |
| Deborah Kahn | American | b. 1953 | European Medieval art and architecture, Canterbury Cathedral | Professor, author |
| Geeta Kapur | Indian | b. 1943 | Indian contemporary art | |
| Ebba Koch | Austrian | | Indian art history, Mughal-era (architecture, gardens, painting, applied arts), and connecting imperial symbolism. | Professor at the Institute of Art History in Vienna, Austria. |
| Charlotte Klonk | German | | Modern Art, Contemporary Art, Museology | Art historian |
| Stella Kramrisch | Austrian | 1896–1993 | Indian art of the 20th-century | Professor, curator |
| Rosalind Krauss | American | b. 1941 | 20th-century painting, sculpture and photography | Author, associate editor of Artforum from 1971 to 1974, professor at Columbia University |
| Annette Kuhn | English | b. 1945 | Feminist film theory, visual culture, cultural memory | Author, researcher, historian |
| Miwon Kwon | Korean | b.1961 | Contemporary art, site-specific art, land art | |
| Michelle Kuo | American | b.1977 or 1978 | | Historian, curator of painting and sculpture at the Museum of Modern Art, editor-in-chief of Artforum from 2010 to 2017 |
| Ewa Lajer-Burcharth | Polish | | 18th and 19th century European, contemporary art, feminist and critical theory, Jacques-Louis David | Professor at Harvard University. |
| Lynne Lawner | American | | Renaissance | Author, scholar, historian with an emphasis on iconographical themes, the meaning of art, as well as social customs. |
| Élisabeth Lebovici | French | b. 1953 | Contemporary art, feminist art, Queer art, Louise Bourgeois, Nancy Spero, | Queer theory scholar, art historian, author, writer |
| Annette Lemieux | American | b. 1957 | Contemporary art | Professor, artist |
| Amelia Sarah Levetus | English, Austrian | 1853–1938 | Modern art | Author, cultural journalist |
| Samella Lewis | American | b. 1924 | African-American art | Art historian, art critic, and printmaker |
| Lucy Lippard | American | b. 1937 | Contemporary art | Art critic, curator |
| Marcella Lista | French | | 20th Century art | Chief curator at the Centre Pompidou. |
| Jermayne MacAgy | American | 1914–1964 | American abstract expressionism | Curator and acting director of the California Palace of the Legion of Honor in San Francisco, director of the Contemporary Arts Museum Houston |
| Catherine Mason | Australian, English | | Computer art, digital art | Art historian |
| Christa C. Mayer Thurman | German, American | b. 1934 | Textiles | Curator and chair of the textiles department at the Art Institute of Chicago |
| Jennifer Montagu | English | b. 1931 | Italian Baroque sculpture | Art historian |
| Doula Mouriki | Greek | 1934–1991 | Byzantinologist, Historian of Art | Professor |
| Claudia Müller-Ebeling | German | b. 1956 | Healing arts, shamanism | Author |
| Laura Mulvey | English | b. 1941 | Feminist film theory | feminist film theorist, professor at Birkbeck, University of London |
| Joanna Mytkowska | Polish | b. 1970 | Contemporary art | Director of the Museum of Modern Art, Warsaw, curator, art critic |
| Mika Natif | Israeli | | Islamic painting: Central Asia, Iran, India, and the Mediterranean | Art historian |
| Gael Newton | Australian | b. 1949 | Art historian/curator specialising in photography of the Asia-Pacific region | Foundation curator, Photography, AGNSW 1974-1985, Senior curator Australian National Gallery 1985–2014, Member of the Order of Australia (AM) |
| Linda Nochlin | American | 1931–2017 | Feminist art history | Art historian |
| Elizabeth Norton | English | | Tudor period, queens of England | Author, specializing in archaeology and anthropology. |
| Nana Oforiatta Ayim | Ghanaian | | Pan-African art | Art historian, writer, and filmmaker. |
| Lotte Brand Philip | German | 1910–1986 | | |
| Michèle Pirazzoli-t'Serstevens | French | 1934–2018 | Chinese objects | |
| Heleni Polichronatou | Greek | b. 1959 | Contemporary public art, land art | |
| Griselda Pollock | English, Canadian | b. 1949 | | |
| Elizabeth Prettejohn | American | b. 1961 | Victorian Art, Pre-Raphaelites | Art historian, Professor, curator, author |
| Nancy Princenthal | American | b. 1955 | Shirin Neshat, Doris Salcedo, Robert Mangold, Alfredo Jaar, Jackie Ferrara, Joyce Kozloff, Hannah Wilke, Agnes Martin | Artist biographer, writer |
| Dragana Lucija Ratković Aydemir | Croatian | b. 1969 | | Croatian museums |
| Arlene Raven | American | 1944–2006 | Feminist art history, Feminist art movement in the United States | Art historian, art critic, and founder of the Los Angeles Woman's Building |
| Hilla Rebay | German, American | 1890–1967 | Modern art | Co-founder and first director of the Solomon R. Guggenheim Museum, abstract artist, art collector |
| Günsel Renda | Turkish | | Ottoman art | Professor |
| Grete Ring | German | 1887–1952 | Art historian and dealer | Partner at the Paul Cassirer gallery in Weimar Berlin; uncovered Van Gogh forgeries |
| Trina Robbins | American | 1938–2024 | History of comics | Artist and writer |
| Barbara Rose | American | 1936–2020 | | |
| Moira Roth | English, American | 1933–2021 | Feminist art history | Author, professor of art history at Mills College in Oakland, California, and taught at the University of California, San Diego |
| Anda Rottenberg | Polish | b. 1944 | | |
| Tina Rivers Ryan | American | | New media art, digital art, internet art, NFTs | Curator at the Albright–Knox Art Gallery. |
| Kim Sajet | Netherlands | | | Museum director of the National Portrait Gallery. |
| Bénédicte Savoy | French | b. 1972 | Modern art, looted art | Professor at Technische Universität Berlin |
| Bente Scavenius | Danish | b. 1944 | Danish art history | Independent scholar, art critic, and author |
| Véronique Schiltz | French | 1942–2019 | Scythian art in the first millennium BCE and the first millennium CE | Archaeologist, art historian, and literary translator. |
| Johanna Schopenhauer | German | 1766–1838 | | Artist, author |
| Nada Shabout | American | b. 1962 | Modern Iraqi art | Art historian |
| Mary Sheriff | American | 1950–2016 | eighteenth-century art | Art Historian |
| Kaja Silverman | American | b. 1947 | | Film theorist, art historian |
| Alessandra Silvestri-Levy | Brazilian | | Producer and writer | |
| Jenni Sorkin | American | b. 1977 | American craft history | Author, curator, professor at the University of California, Santa Barbara |
| Anna Spitzmüller | Austrian | 1903-2001 | | Art historian, curator |
| Barbara Maria Stafford | American | b. 1941 | Developments in imaging arts, optical sciences, and performance technologies | Art historian, researcher |
| Nina Howell Starr | American | 1903–2000 | American roadside attractions, American folk art, Outsider artists | Art historian, photographer, curator, art dealer |
| Kate Steinitz | German, American | 1889–1975 | | Artist, art historian |
| Klara Steinweg | German | 1903–1972 | Italian Renaissance | Art historian, co-author of the book series Critical and Historical Corpus of Florentine Painting. |
| Kristine Stiles | American | b. 1947 | | Art historian, curator |
| Margaret Stokes | Irish | 1832–1900 | | Antiquarian |
| Marilyn Stokstad | American | 1929–2016 | Medieval and Spanish art | Art historian, professor, author |
| Z. S. Strother | American | | 20th and 21st-century Central and West African art history | Professor of African Art at Columbia University |
| Deborah Swallow | English | b. 1948 | Indian art history | Director of the Courtauld Institute of Art since 2004. |
| Mary Hamilton Swindler | American | 1884–1967 | Ancient classical painting | Archeologist, professor |
| Vera Tamari | Palestinian | b. 1945 | Palestinian art, Palestinian ceramics, Palestinian architecture | Founder of Birzeit Museum Art, former art history professor at Birzeit University, and visual artist |
| Ann Temkin | American | b. 1959 | American painting and sculpture | Curator |
| Dorothy Burr Thompson | American | 1900–2001 | | |
| Erica Tietze-Conrat | Austrian, American | 1883–1958 | Contemporary Viennese Art, Renaissance art, the Venetian school | Academic lecturer |
| Marjorie Tipping | Australian | 1917–2009 | | Historian |
| Virginia Tovar Martín | Spanish | 1929–2013 | Architecture and urban planning of Madrid during the Baroque period | Spanish art historian, author, and professor |
| Jocelyn Toynbee | English | 1897–1985 | | |
| Rachida Triki | Tunisian | b. 1949 | North African art | Professor at Tunis University. |
| Marcia Tucker | American | 1940–2006 | | |
| Eleanor Tufts | American | 1927–1991 | American women artists, works by Luis Egidio Meléndez | Academic lecturer, writer |
| Georgiana Uhlyarik | Romanian | b. 1972 | Indigenous Canadian art, women artists | Fredrik S. Eaton Curator of Canadian Art at the Art Gallery of Ontario (AGO) |
| Rose Valland | French | 1898–1980 | | Commission for the Recovery of Works of Art (during WWII) |
| G. T. van Ysselsteyn | Dutch | 1892–1975 | Dutch textile history | |
| Kapila Vatsyayan | Indian | 1928–2020 | Indian art | |
| Emily Vermeule | American | 1928–2001 | Ancient Greek art, Mycenaean culture | Classical scholar and archaeologist, professor at Harvard University. |
| Cecylia Vetulani | Polish | 1908–1980 | | |
| Anne Wagner | American | b. 1949 | Modern and contemporary art | Art historian, professor emerita |
| Renate Wagner-Rieger | Austrian | 1921–1980 | Architecture, historicism | Academic lecturer |
| Judith Wechsler | American | b. 1940 | 19th century French art | Documentary filmmaker; professor emerita |
| Charlotte Weidler | German | 1895–1983 | German expressionism | Art dealer, curator, and she held a pivotal role in bringing major works of Germany to the United States; resulting restitution claims concerning the collections of Paul Westheim and Alfred Flechtheim. |
| Evelyn Welch | American | b. 1959 | Renaissance and early modern | Art historian, professor |
| Herta Wescher | German, French | 1899–1971 | European modern art, abstract art and collage | Journalist, art critic |
| Edith Wharton | American | 1862–1937 | Architecture | Writer |
| Margaret Whinney | English | 1897–1975 | English art history | Academic lecturer |
| Zoé Whitley | American, English | 1979 | Contemporary art, United Kingdom's Black Art movement, African diaspora | Curator, museum director |
| Diana Widmaier Picasso | French | b. 1974 | Modern art, old master drawings | Curator, author, gallerist |
| Sylvia Williams | American | 1936–1996 | African art | Curator, museum director |
| Deborah Willis (artist) | American | 1948 | African American and Black photographers | Curator, author, photographer, educator |
| Sarah Wilson | English | | Pierre Klossowski, Henri Matisse, Post-structuralism | Professor at Courtauld Institute, author |
| Juliet Wilson–Bareau | English | b. 1935 | Francisco Goya, Édouard Manet | Art historian, scholar, professor at University of Oxford. |
| Rachel Wischnitzer | German | 1885–1989 | Jewish art | Architect, professor, author, art historian |
| Margot Wittkower | German, American | 1902–1995 | Neo-Palladian Architecture, Italian Renaissance, Baroque | Writer, Interior Design |
| Joanna Woodall | English | b. 1956 | Portraiture, Netherlandish Art | |
| Mary Woodall | English | 1901–1988 | Thomas Gainsborough scholar | Museum director, curator |
| Helen Woodruff | American | 1899–1980 | European medieval history and Christian art | Director of the Index of Christian Art (now Index of Medieval Art) at Princeton University, art historian, curator |
| Frances Yates | English | 1899–1981 | Renaissance | |
| Stefania Zahorska | Polish | 1890–1961 | | Polish prosaist |
| Hilde Zaloscer | Austrian | 1903–1999 | Coptic Art | Art historian, professor at University of Alexandria and Carleton University Ottawa. |
| Marie-Cécile Zinsou | French, Beninese | b. 1982 | Contemporary art in Africa | President of Fondation Zinsou and in 2014 she found the Museum of Contemporary Art in Benin, the first museum of art in the country. |
| Rebecca Zorach | American | b. 1969 | Early modern European, contemporary | Art historian, professor |
