= Helen Woodruff =

Helen Woodruff may refer to:

- Helen Woodruff (art historian) (1899–1980), American art historian, scholar of medieval history
- Helen S. Woodruff (1888–1924), American author, playwright, and philanthropist
