= Anneliese Bulling =

American art historian

Anneliese Bulling (April 21, 1900, in Ellwürden, Wesermarch (today known as Lower Saxony) – February 9, 2004, in Philadelphia, Pennsylvania), also known as Anneliese Gutkind, was a German–American art historian specializing in Chinese art and architecture.

== Life ==
Anneliese Bulling came from a wealthy, long-established and well-educated German landowning family. She lived with her father, Henry Bulling (1858–1940), a banker, and her mother, Anna Umbsen (1867–1955). In 1927, she had a short-lived marriage to a farmer that was soon declared invalid. After her failed first marriage, Bulling went off to study Art History and Chinese Studies in Berlin at Friedrich Wilhelm University (now Humboldt University of Berlin) under Erich Haenisch and Brinkmann.

In 1935 she graduated with a degree in Chinese Architecture, and in the same year emigrated to London with her partner, the Jewish architect Erwin Gutkind.

In 1946 she found work as a research scholar at the Universities China Committee and then in 1947 in Cambridge at Newnham College, where she received a PhD, the subject of her dissertation being Representational Art in the Han Period.

Bulling's research focus was Chinese art history, especially architecture and arts and crafts. She developed a theory that the Chinese characters are the result of prehistoric (Neolithic) astronomical calendar symbols.

In 1956, Bulling and Gutkind married and emigrated to the United States for his professorship at the University of Philadelphia.

In 1964 she joined Dr. Stackler's translation project, translating many Chinese books, and in 1966 she was promoted to Research Associate for Chinese Art and Archaeology at Columbia University in New York.

Her husband died in 1968.

Bulling died in 2004 at the age of 103. She had left the Oldenburg Municipal Museum an extensive collection of letters of correspondence from 1928 to 1946 (around 4,200 letters and postcards), was the inspiration for the 2009 book, From Ellwürden to Hampstead. The letters of the Oldenburg emigrant Anneliese Bulling. A contribution to the history of mentalities of the Oldenburg bourgeoisie in the period of National Socialism by Andreas Vonderach.

== Publications ==
=== Monographs ===
- The Chinese Architecture of the Han Period to the End of the T'ang Period. Lyon, 1935
- The Meaning of China's Most Ancient Kind. Leiden, 1952
- The Decoration of Mirrors of the Han Period: A Chronology. Ascona: Artibus Asiae, 1960

=== Essays ===
- Neolithic Symbol and the Purpose of Art in China. The Burlington Magazine 82, 1943, pp. 91–101
- Bulling Gutkind, Annelise (Summer 1972). "Archaeological Excavation in China, 1949-1966" (PDF). UPENN Expedition Magazine. 14 (4).
- Bulling, Anneliese (May 1951). "Late Zhou and Han Art at the British Museum". British Museum. 93 (578).

== Literature ==
- Vonderach, Andreas (2009). From Ellwürden to Hampstead. The letters of the Oldenburg emigrant Anneliese Bulling. A contribution to the history of mentalities of the Oldenburg bourgeoisie in the period of National Socialism (in German). Germany: Rüstringer Heimatbund e V., Verlag Wilhelm Böning, Nordenham. p. 176. ISBN 978-3-00-027620-0.
- Martin Kern: The emigration of sinologist 1933-1945. For the unwritten history of their losses. In: Helmut Martin, Christiane Hammer (ed.): China Sciences - German developments. History, people, perspectives. Hamburg 1999, pp. 222–242
- Rudolf Hierl: Erwin Anton Gutkind. Dissertation, Marburg 1989

== See also ==
- Women in the art history field
