= Taína Caragol =

American art historian

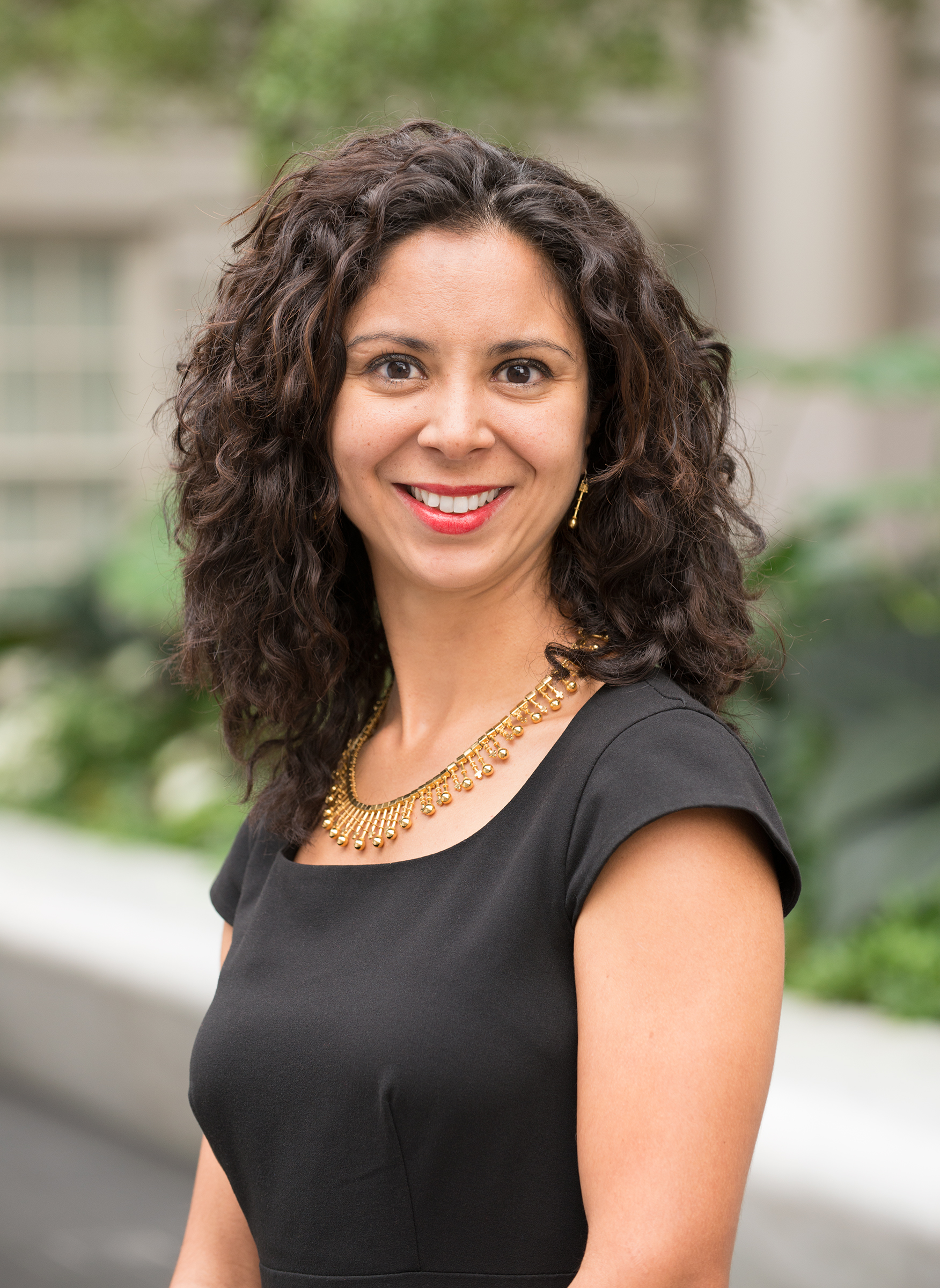
- Caragol (2013)
- Other names: Taína Beatriz Caragol-Barreto, Taina B. Caragol
- Education: University of Puerto Rico, Río Piedras, Middlebury College, CUNY Graduate Center
- Occupations: art historian, curator, author
- Employers: National Portrait Gallery, Museo de Arte de Ponce, Museum of Modern Art
- Known for: Latin American art

Taína Caragol also known as Taína Beatriz Caragol-Barreto, is a Puerto Rican art historian, curator, and author. She currently serves as the curator for Latino Art and History at the National Portrait Gallery, since 2013. She previously held positions at Museum of Modern Art (MoMA) and at the Museo de Arte de Ponce.

== Biography ==
Caragol has a BA degree in modern languages from the University of Puerto Rico, Río Piedras and a MA degree in French studies from Middlebury College. She has a PhD in 2013 in art history from the Graduate Center of the City University of New York. Her dissertation was titled, “Boom and Dust: The Rise of Latin American and Latino Art in New York Exhibition Venues and Auction Houses, 1970s–1980s”.

Since 2013, she has curator for Latino Art and History at the National Portrait Gallery in Washington, D.C. Caragol was hired in part to diversify the museum collection holdings, and to promote diversity in museum representation and American identity in exhibitions. At the time of hire, the National Portrait Gallery had a 22,000-piece collection and held less than 1% Latino, 5% Black, and less than 25% female portraits. In the first 5 years at the role, she grew the Latin representation to 2.5%, mostly with around 150 new works by Latino artists.

She previously held a position as the Latin American bibliographer for the Museum of Modern Art (MoMA) in New York City, from 2004 to 2007; and as curator of education at the Museo de Arte de Ponce in Ponce, Puerto Rico in 2010.

== See also ==
- Women in the art history field

== Publications ==
A list of select publications by Caragol:

- Caragol, Taína; Moss, Dorothy; Powell, Richard; Sajet, Kim (2020). "Unveiling the Unconventional, Kehinde Wiley's Portrait of Barack Obama". The Obama Portraits. Princeton, New Jersey: Princeton University Press. ISBN 9780691203294.
- Caragol, Taína (2006). Archival Collections Guide: Survey of Archives of Latino and Latin American Art. Museum of Modern Art. New York City, New York: Museum of Modern Art Library.
- Caragol, Taína B. (Fall 2005). "Archives of Reality, Contemporary Efforts to Document Latino Art". American Art. 19 (3). Smithsonian American Art Museum. doi:10.1086/500224. S2CID 191217868.
