= William H. Forsyth =

American artist

William Holmes Forsyth was an American artist.

== Early life and education ==
Forsyth was born in Chicago. He was educated at the Latin School of Chicago and the Hotchkiss School in Lakeville, Connecticut. Later, he attended Princeton University in 1930, where he studied art history under Charles Rufus Morey.

Forsyth married Agnes Mitchell in 1942.

== Career ==
Forsyth started his career at the Metropolitan Museum of Art in 1933, initially volunteering for the medieval collection.

By 1934, Forsyth had become an assistant, working under curator James Rorimer. Forsyth and Rorimer were instrumental in establishing the Cloisters, facilitated by John D. Rockefeller Jr.'s donation of land and medieval artifacts, including the notable The Unicorn Tapestries.

In 1937, Forsyth was instrumental in acquiring the last two pieces of the Unicorn Tapestries from France, completing the collection. The Cloisters opened the following year. Forsyth's career progressed within the museum, leading to his promotion to curator in 1968.

Forsyth authored several scholarly works, including The Entombment of Christ: French Sculptures of the 15th and 16th Centuries and The Pietà in French Late Gothic Sculpture: Regional Variations. He retired from the Metropolitan Museum of Art in 1971, at which point he was named emeritus curator.

== Bibliography ==
- The Entombment of Christ: French Sculptures of the 15th and 16th Centuries
- The Pietà in French Late Gothic Sculpture: Regional Variations
