= Oeming =

Oeming is a German-language surname and may refer to:

- Al Oeming (1925–2014), Canadian wildlife conservationist, zoologist, professional wrestler and wrestling promoter
- Julie Oeming Badiee (née Julie Anne Oeming; 1947–2001), American art historian, educator
- Michael Avon Oeming (fl. 1998–present), American comic book creator, both as an artist and writer
