= Ṣaḥīfa Bānū =

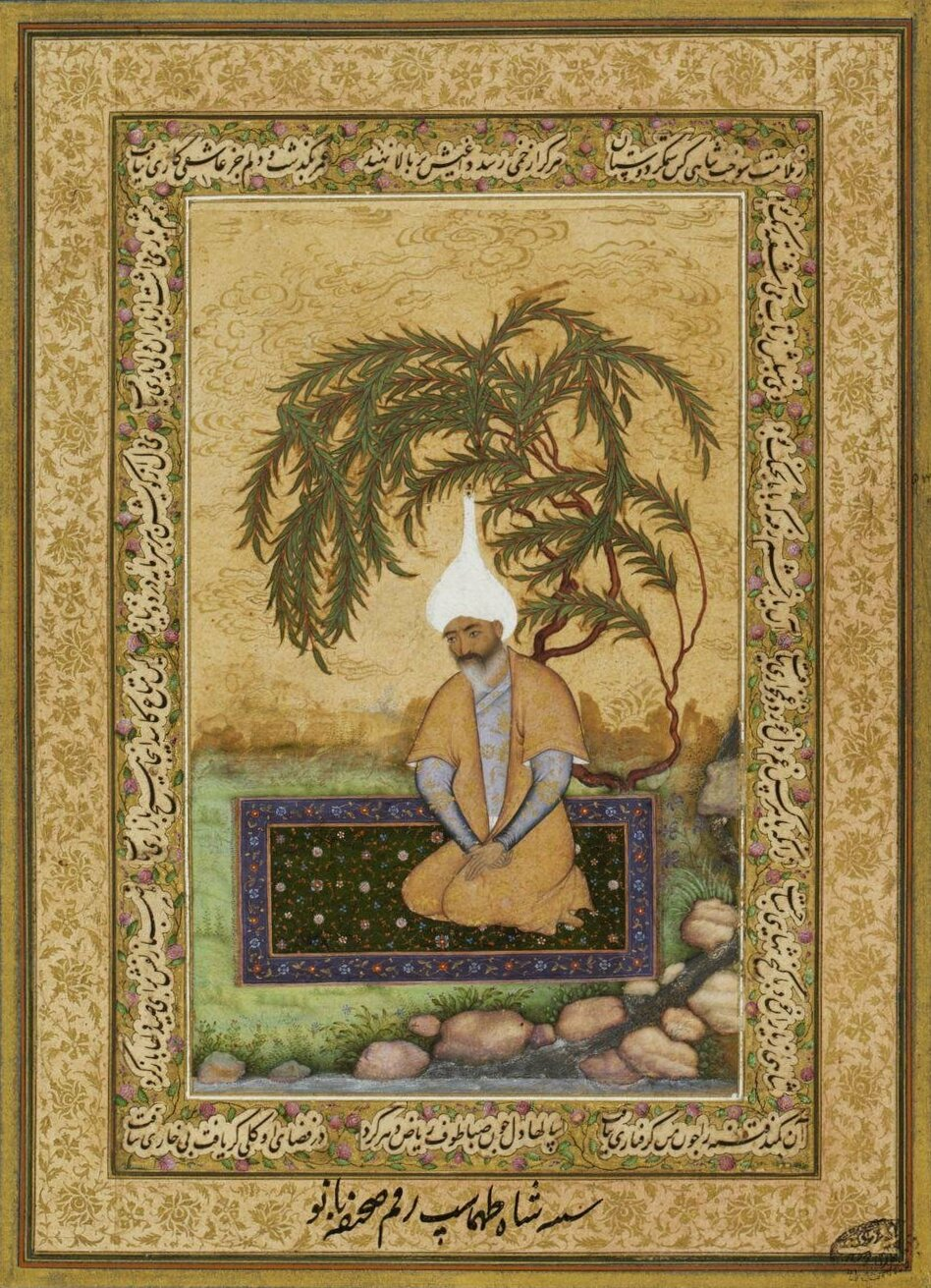
- Shah Tahmasp of Iran by Ṣaḥīfa Bānū
- Occupation: Painter

Ṣaḥīfa Bānū (early 17th century) was a miniature painter during the reign of Jahangir. She is one of a very few known female artists of Mughal painting.

Nothing is known of Sahifa Banu's life. Some scholars have speculated she was a princess or other member of the nobility.

Three miniature paintings are attributed to Sahifa Banu. Her painting of Shah Tahmasp of Iran is owned by the Victoria and Albert Museum, part of a large bequest of Mughal paintings from Lady Wantage. Her name is written on the work in handwriting that Som Prakash Verma identifies as that of Jahangir. The Aga Khan Museum owns a painting attributed to her, The Son Who Mourned His Father, that is an illustration of a story from the Mantiq al-Tair. The Golestan Palace Library owns her depiction of The Building of the Castle of Khawarnaq from the Khamsa of Nizami.

The latter two paintings echo, but are not slavish copies of, earlier works by Kamāl ud-Dīn Behzād. Mika Natif notes that in Sahifa Banu's painting of Khawarnaq, the changes she made to volume, space, and perspective demonstrate her mastery of European painting techniques and her influence.
