= Elula Perrin =

French-Vietnamese writer (1929–2003)

- Born: 1929; Hanoi, French Indochina
- Died: May 22, 2003 (aged 73–74); Paris, France
- Occupations: Writer, nightclub owner
- Writing career
- Language: French
- Notable work: Les Femmes préfèrent les femmes

Elula Perrin (1929 – 22 May 2003) was a French writer and a prominent figure in Paris’s lesbian nightlife scene.

== Biography ==
Elula Perrin was born in Hanoi, in what was then French Indochina, in 1929. In 1946, at the age of 17, she moved to France. She earned a degree in law, married and moved to Morocco with her husband, where she discovered her homosexuality.

In 1969, together with Aimée Mori, she opened Le Katmandou, a nightclub that became a focal point of lesbian nightlife in Paris. It closed 20 years later, in 1989. She gained public attention in 1977 with her autobiographical book Les Femmes préfèrent les femmes ("Women Prefer Women") and appeared on television programs to speak openly about her attraction to women. She went on to write several more works exploring lesbian themes, among them Tant qu'il y aura des femmes ("As Long as There Are Women") and Mousson de femmes ("Monsoon of Women").

In the late 1980s, she opened another nightclub, Le Privilège, located near the Théâtre Le Palace. She also co-wrote two detective novels with author Hélène de Monferrand.

In 2000, Catherine Gonnard directed a documentary about her life titled Elula, les hommes on s'en fout ("Elula, We Don’t Give a Damn About Men"). Perrin died in Paris on 22 May 2003, following a long illness. She was 74 years old.

== Works ==
- Les Femmes préfèrent les femmes, Ramsay, Paris, 1977; J'ai lu, 1985; Double interligne, Paris, 1997; La Cerisaie, Paris, 2002.
- Tant qu'il y aura des femmes, Ramsay, Paris, 1978.
- Alice au pays des femmes, Ramsay, Paris, 1980.
- Mousson de femmes, Ramsay, Paris, 1985; La Cerisaie, Paris, 2003. (Preface by Josée Dayan)
- Pour l'amour des femmes, Ramsay, Paris, 1995.
- L’Eurasienne, Editions Osmondes, Paris, 1997.
- Va y avoir mistral, elles ne sont pas toutes gentilles, Double interligne, Paris, 1999.
- Bulles et noctambules: histoire de la nuit au féminin, Double interligne, Paris, 2000.
- Révolte des amours mortes (elle préfère toujours les femmes), La Cerisaie, Paris, 2003.
- Un amour, deux femmes, with Louna Borca. La Cerisaie, Paris, 2004.
