= Friedrich Möbius =

Friedrich Möbius may refer to:

- Friedrich Möbius (art historian)
- Friedrich Möbius (poet)
