= Christa C. Mayer Thurman =

American curator and author (1934–2024)

- Born: Christa Charlotte Mayer; December 12, 1934; Darmstadt, Germany
- Died: September 13, 2024 (aged 89); St. Charles, Illinois, U.S.
- Other name: Christa C. Mayer–Thurman
- Education: Finch College (BA), New York University Institute of Fine Arts (MA)
- Occupations: Museum curator, art historian, author, scholar
- Spouse(s): Lawrence S. Thurman (m. 1971–1990; his death), Arsenio G. Sala (m. 2001–2013; his death), George A. Larson (m. 2021–2024; her death)

Christa Charlotte Mayer Thurman (December 12, 1934 – September 13, 2024), was a German and American curator, art historian, author, and scholar. She served for forty-two years as the curator and chair of the textiles department at the Art Institute of Chicago. In 1992, she was the namesake of an endowed position created in her credit, the Christa C. Mayer Thurman Chair and Curator of Textiles. Thurman was awarded an honorary fellow of the American Craft Council (ACC) in 2000.

== Early life, family, and education ==
Christa Charlotte Mayer was born on December 12, 1934 in Darmstadt, Hesse, Germany. As a child, she moved with her family to Zurich, Switzerland. She was educated in Germany and Switzerland, prior to attending college.

Thurman moved to New York City in 1954 to study at Finch College (B.A. degree, 1958). After college, she worked as a conservation apprentice and assistant curator in the textile department at Cooper Hewitt, Smithsonian Design Museum in New York City for several years. She received her Master of Arts (M.A.) degree from the New York University Institute of Fine Arts in 1966.

She was married to Lawrence S. Thurman from 1971 until 1990, and to Arsenio G. Sala from 2001 to 2013, however both of these marriages ended in her becoming a widow. Her final marriage was to George A. Larson in 2021.

== Career ==
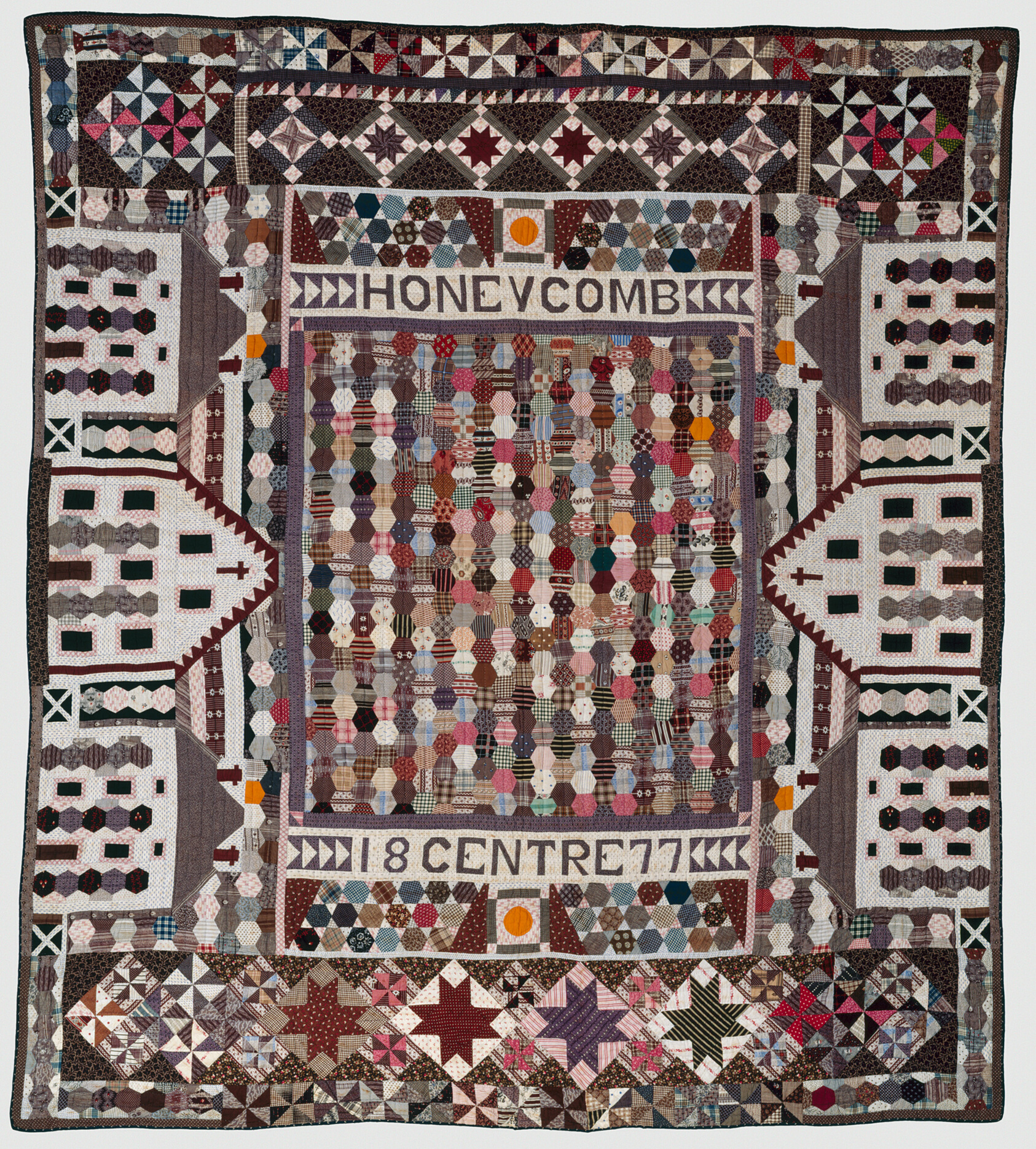
Quilt from the Christa C. Mayer Textile Endowment at the Art Institute of Chicago

During her four decades (from 1967 until retiring in 2009) at the Art Institute of Chicago, Thurman expanded the textile collection within the department of textiles. She also established a laboratory for conservation and preservation of the growing collection.

Thurman curated more than eighty exhibitions. Among her many exhibitions and publications at the Art Institute of Chicago, notable exhibitions include the Masterpieces of Western textiles from the Art Institute of Chicago (1969), Claire Zeisler, a Retrospective (1979), Raiment For The Lord's Service: A Thousand Years of Western Vestments (1975), Ancient Textiles from Nubia (1990), and Rooted in Chicago: Fifty Years of Textile Design Traditions (1997). The exhibition, The Divine Art: Four Centuries of European Tapestries (2008) displayed all of the Art Institute of Chicago's European tapestries together for the first time, some sixty-two in total; an exhibition that was made possible by Thurman's restoration efforts. The Christa C. Mayer Textile Endowment highlights the textile collection at the Art Institute of Chicago.

She wrote and contributed to numerous publications throughout her career, including the catalogue, Design in America: The Cranbrook Vision, 1925–1940.

Thurman died on September 13, 2024, in her home in St. Charles, Illinois.

== Awards ==
Thurman was featured in The Chicago Tribune for her work on The Divine Art: Four Centuries of European Tapestries in 2008. Thurman was also featured in the Art Institute's exhibition, Making History: Women of the Art Institute (2011) which showcased archival materials linked to eight women who made significant contributions or had a lifelong association with the museum.

In 1992, Thurman's curatorial position was anonymously endowed and named in her honor. In 2004, she became the first textile curator to receive the Getty Fellowship. She remained a leading member of the Centre International d’Études des Textiles Anciens (CIETA) for decades, and has presented her research internationally.

== Bibliography ==
- Mayer-Thurman, Christa C. (1965). Two Centuries of Needle Lace. Verlag nicht ermittelbar, Erscheinungsort nicht ermittelbar. OCLC 753300524.
- Clark, Robert Judson; de Long, David G.; Eidelberg, Martin; Farmer, J. David; Gerard, John; Harris, Neil; Marter, Joan; Miller, R. Craig; Riordan, Mary (1983). Design in America: The Cranbrook Vision, 1925–1950. Roy Slade, Davira S. Taragin, Christa C. Mayer Thurman. Abrams Books. ISBN 9780870993411.
- Mayer-Thurman, Christa C. (1992). Textiles in the Art Institute of Chicago. Art Institute of Chicago. ISBN 9780810938564. OCLC 25628984.
- Palladino, Pia; Kanter, Laurence B.; Mayer Thurman, Christa C. (1994). Painting and Illumination in Early Renaissance Florence, 1300-1450. Metropolitan Museum of Art New York. ISBN 978-0-8109-6488-4.
- Mayer Thurman, Christa C. (2001). European Textiles in the Robert Lehman Collection. Vol. 14. New York City, NY and Princeton, NJ: The Metropolitan Museum of Art, Princeton University Press. OCLC 1365886440.

== See also ==
- Women in the art history field
