= Friedrich Möbius (art historian) =

German art historian (1928–2024)

Friedrich Otto Karl Möbius
- Born: 24 May 1928; Dresden, Germany
- Died: 7 August 2024 (aged 96)
- Education: University of Leipzig
- Occupations: Art and architectural historian
- Employer: Friedrich Schiller University Jena
- Known for: Medieval architecture, iconology, Westwerkstudien
- Spouse: Helga Möbius-Sciurie (second wife)
- Relatives: Peter Paul Möbius (brother)
- Awards: Member of the Saxon Academy of Sciences and Humanities (1977–1992)

Friedrich Otto Karl Möbius (24 May 1928 – 7 August 2024) was a German art and architectural historian. From 1976 to 1991, he was the full professor of art history at the Friedrich-Schiller-Universität Jena.

== Life ==
Born in Dresden and brother to the physicist Peter Paul Möbius (born 6 June 1930 in Meißen), he studied history and art history at the University of Leipzig from 1948 to 1953, where he was mainly influenced by Heinz Ladendorf. He made his living as a theatre reviewer and columnist for the local press. In 1953 he began a doctorate supervised by Lottlisa Behling at the University of Jena and - despite her departure for West Germany in 1958 - he defended his dissertation The Stadtkirche St. Michael in Jena. A medieval monument as a historical figure. summa cum laude.

In addition to monographs on individual medieval churches, Möbius went beyond the interpretation of architectural forms of building and decoration into aspects of architectural history transcending eras, making the semiotics and iconology of medieval architecture his focus. He was a teaching assistant at the Art Historical Institute in Jena and habilitated in 1967 with his thesis Westwerkstudien at the Philosophical Faculty.

After being made professor for cultural theory in 1971, he was reappointed to the chair of art history at Jena University (vacant since 1958) in 1976. He became a full member of the Saxon Academy of Sciences and Humanities in Leipzif in 1977, remaining one until 1992. He formed the interdisciplinary Jena Working Group for Iconography and Iconology in 1978, which organised seven international conferences between then and 1990. He was denied a visiting professorship at Philipps-Universität Marburg by the East German authorities. In 1978 the art historian Helga Möbius-Sciurie (6 March 1940, Jena - ?) became his second wife. His most productive period ended abruptly when the publication of manuscripts ready for printing, which were intended to take stock of his research, failed due to the Peaceful Revolution and in 1991 he was dismissed from Jena University. After teaching in Hamburg and Karlsruhe from 1992 to 1995, he wrote his memoirs, in which he openly deals with his dealings with the Stasi.

Recognised as a "significant research personality", he continued to publish biographies, essays and scholarly work. Some of his works are among the most fundamental works in German art history between 1950 and 2000. In addition to his Westwerkstudien (1968) for example his introductory essay for the anthology Stil und Gesellschaft (Style and Society, 1984) was included in the collection Neue Wege der Forschung. The entire collection of essays edited by Mobius is recommended as a reference work. His extensive studies on medieval village churches, reflected in his The Parish Church in the Age of the Cathedral ('Die Dorfkirche im Zeitalter der Kathedrale', 1988) and in a separate chapter in History of German Art ('Geschichte der deutschen Kunst', 1989), were still highlighted in 2001 by Wolfgang Schenkluhn as "exceptional" in architectural history.

== Selected works ==
- Westwerkstudien. Jena 1968.
- Romanische Kunst. Union/Schroll, Berlin/Wien/München 1969.
- Ecclesia ornata. Ornament am mittelalterlichen Kirchenbau. Union, Berlin 1974 (with Helga Möbius).
- Architektur des Mittelalters. Funktion und Gestalt. Hg. v. Friedrich Möbius u. Ernst Schubert. Böhlaus Nachfolger, Weimar 1983.
- Symbolwerte mittelalterlicher Kunst. Seemann, Leipzig 1984 (with Helga Sciurie).
- Stil und Gesellschaft. Ein Problemaufriß.. Hg. v. Friedrich Möbius (Fundus-Bücher. 89/90), Verlag der Kunst, Dresden 1984.
- Buticum in Centula. Mit einer Einführung in die Bedeutung der mittelalterlichen Architektur (= Abhandlungen der Sächsischen Akademie der Wissenschaften zu Leipzig, Phil.-hist. Klasse, Bd. 71, Heft 1), Leipzig 1985.
- Skulptur des Mittelalters. Funktion und Gestalt. Hg. v. Friedrich Möbius u. Ernst Schubert. Böhlaus Nachfolger, Weimar 1987, ISBN 3-7400-0053-8.
- Die Dorfkirche im Zeitalter der Kathedrale (13. Jh.). Plädoyer für eine strukturgeschichtliche Vertiefung des Stilbegriffs (= Abhandlungen der Sächsischen Akademie der Wissenschaften zu Leipzig, Phil.-hist. Klasse, Bd. 128, Heft 3). Leipzig 1988, ISBN 3-05-000586-6.
- Stil und Epoche. Periodisierungsfragen. Hg. v. Friedrich Möbius u. Helga Sciurie (= Fundus-Bücher. 118/119), Verlag der Kunst, Dresden 1989, ISBN 3-364-00166-9.
- Geschichte der deutschen Kunst 1200–1350. Hg. v. Friedrich Möbius u. Helga Sciurie. Seemann, Leipzig 1989, ISBN 3-363-00407-9.
- Der Himmel über der Erde. Kosmossymbolik in mittelalterlicher Kunst. Hg. v. Friedrich Möbius. Evangelische Verlagsanstalt, Leipzig 1995, ISBN 3-374-01567-0.
- Wohnung, Tempel, Gotteshaus. Beobachtungen zur Anthropologie religiösen Verhaltens. Schnell und Steiner, Regensburg 2008, ISBN 978-3-86583-670-0.
- Zwischen Hörsaal, Kirche und Theater. Studentische Existenz in der frühen DDR (Leipzig 1948-52). Universitätsverlag, Leipzig 2012, ISBN 978-3-86583-670-0.
- Die karolingische Reichsklosterkirche Centula (Saint-Riquier) und ihr Reliquienschatz. Eine Fallstudie zum lebensweltlichen Verständnis frühmittelalterlicher Religiosität. Universitätsverlag, Leipzig 2013, ISBN 978-3-86583-767-7.
- Gibt es Gott wirklich nicht? Anregungen aus Neurologie, Psychologie und Religionsgeschichte. Universitätsverlag, Leipzig 2013, ISBN 978-3-86583-944-2.

== Bibliography ==
- (in German) Franz Jäger & Helga Sciurie (ed.): Gestalt, Funktion, Bedeutung. Festschrift für Friedrich Möbius zum 70. Geburtstag. Glaux Verlag, Jena 1999, ISBN 3-931743-24-1.
- (in German) "Works on and by Freidrich Mobius in the DNB".
