= Herta Wescher =

German-born art historian, art critic (1899–1971)

- Born: Herta Kauert; 1899; Krefeld, Germany
- Died: March 3, 1971 (aged 71–72); Paris, France
- Other name: Hertha Wescher
- Occupations: Art critic, art historian
- Known for: Modern art, collage
- Spouse: Paul Wescher (m. 1923–1945; separated)

Herta Wescher (née Herta Kauert; 1899 – March 3, 1971) was a German art critic and art historian, who worked in France. She specialized in the study of modern art, and was an authority of collage art.

== Early life and education ==
Herta Kauert was born in 1899, in Krefeld, Germany, to parents were Maria (née Jentges) and merchant Heinrich Kauert. She attended the lyceum, and also took private classes; in 1917 she graduated from high school in Bonn.

After graduating from high school, she studied art history, history, and archeology at Heidelberg University, at the Ludwig-Maximilians-Universität München, and the University of Freiburg. She studied under Swiss-German art historian, Heinrich Wölfflin in Munich, and formed relationships with Wölfflin's students, such as Franz Roh, Hans Curjel, Sigfried Giedion, and Carola Giedion-Welcker. In Freiburg, Kauert studied under art historian Hans Jantzen, where she met Jantzen's student Paul Wescher in 1923. She married Paul Wescher in the same year. She received her doctorate from the University of Freiburg under Jantzen in 1924, her thesis was on the 16th century painter Sebastian Dayg.

== Career ==
After graduation, her husband received a position at the Berlin State Museums and she worked there on a voluntary basis in the graphics department under the direction of Max J. Friedländer. Through Friedländer, she was given the opportunity to work on the catalog raisonné of Peter Paul Rubens together with the art historian Ludwig Burchard. She was also involved in the contemporary art scene in Berlin, influenced by Franz Roh, Curt Glaser, Siegried Curjel and the Bauhaus teacher László Moholy-Nagy.

As supporters of the Weimar Republic and the Bauhaus school, the Weschers' views were in direct contrast to the conservative art ideology of National Socialism (or Nazisim). After Adolf Hitler came to power in Germany in 1933, the Weschers immigrated to Paris. Wescher worked as a journalist and between 1935 and 1937 as a correspondent for the British art magazine "Axis". She helped organize the Free Artists' Association, of which the art historians Sabine Spiro and Paul Westheim were also members.

She was interned in 1940 after France entered World War II. Wescher and her husband fled to Basel, Switzerland in 1942. After the end of the war, Wescher separated from her husband in 1945 and returned to Paris.

As a freelance journalist in the early 1950s in Paris, she wrote for the art magazine, "Art d'aujourd'hui". In c. 1953, she helped found the magazine "Cimaise". Her favorite topics at that time included the art form of collage. In 1968, Wescher wrote the monograph "The Collage", still a standard work today.

Wescher died in Paris on March 3, 1971. She became known primarily for her specialization in the previously relatively undiscovered area of collage as an art form and in this field she became an early advocate of non-representational art.

== See also ==
- Women in the art history field
