= Sarah Wilson (art historian) =

Art historian

Sarah Wilson is an art historian and curator; she is a professor of History of Art at the Courtauld Institute, London. In 1997, Wilson was made Chevalier des Arts et des Lettres by the French Government for services to French art and culture.

== Selected publications ==
- Picasso, Marx and Socialist Realism in France, Liverpool, Liverpool University Press, 2013.
- The Visual World of French Theory: Figurations, Yale University Press, 2010.
- Matisse, Barcelona, Ediciones Poligrafa, 2009. (English and Spanish editions)
- ‘Pierre Klossowski, epiphanies and secrets’, Pierre Klossowski, ed. Sarah Wilson Whitechapel Art Gallery and Hatje Cantz, 2006.
- ‘Poststructuralism', Companion to Contemporary Art since 1945, ed. Amelia Jones, Oxford, 2005, Blackwell Companions to Art History.

== See also ==
- Women in the art history field
