= Bérchules =

- Municipality
- Flag Coat of arms

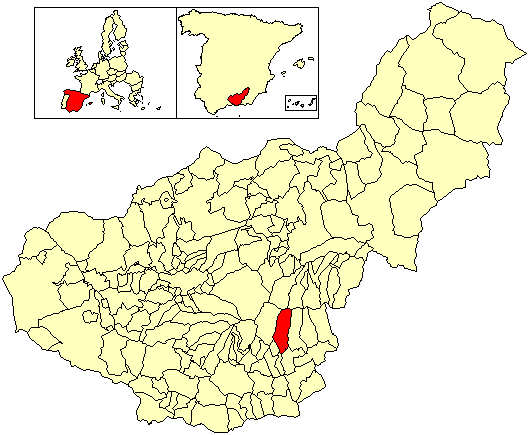

- Location in Spain
- Coordinates: 36°58′N 3°11′W
- Country: Spain
- Autonomous community: Andalusia
- Province: Granada
- Comarca: Alpujarra Granadina
- Judicial district: Órgiva

Government
  - Alcalde: Ricardo Zapata Toro (2007) (PSOE)

Area
  - Total: 69 km^{2} (27 sq mi)
- Elevation: 1,319 m (4,327 ft)

Population (2025-01-01)
  - Total: 688
  - Density: 10/km^{2} (26/sq mi)
- Demonym(s): Berchulero, ra
- Time zone: UTC+1 (CET)
  - Summer (DST): UTC+2 (CEST)
- Postal code: 18451

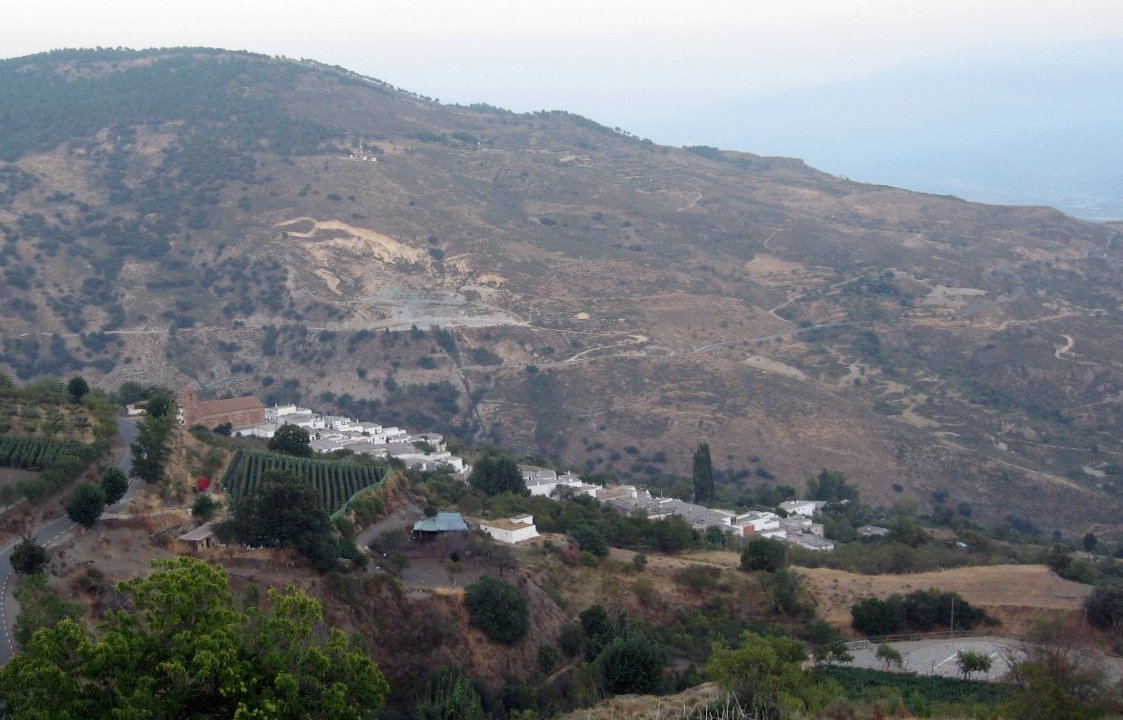
Bérchules (2009)

Bérchules is a village and municipality in the central Alpujarra, in the province of Granada in Spain. The origins of the village are Arab. There are two villages in the municipality, Bérchules (36° 58' north and 3° 11' east, elevation 1350 metres), and Alcútar (36° 58' north and 3° 11' east, elevation 1250 metres). The villages are on the road, Órgiva-Trevélez-Ugíjar, and their population is estimated at 900 and 300 respectively.

The river Grande de Los Bérchules flows past the village on its course from the Sierra Nevada to the Mediterranean at Motril. En route it becomes renamed Rio "Gualdalfeo" and is the main river in the Alpujarra. Like the surrounding area, in general the present population has declined since the mid 20th century when the population was probably nearer to 5,000 inhabitants. Many immigrated to Germany, Switzerland, France, Brazil, Argentina, and to the coastal area of Almería, El Ejido etc.

The traditional agricultural was based on tomatoes, almonds and cattle and continues as the main industry of the village with tourism having an increasing economic importance. Since 2000 an influx of relatively affluent immigrants from northern Europe have also had an effect on the local economy.

Most tourists visit for the hill walking as the village is situated on the GR7 long distance footpath. Local attractions include the "fuente agua agria" water with a high iron content which is purported to have medicinal properties. Notable fiestas include New Year's Eve in August (First Saturday of August), the Festival of San Marcos, with processions of agricultural animals (25 April) and Festival of San Pantaleon, patron saint of Bérchules (27 July), and the Festival of Santo Cristo in Alcútar (9 August).

Notable people from this village include Virginia Tovar Martín.

== See also ==
- List of municipalities in Granada
