= Joanna Woodall =

British art historian

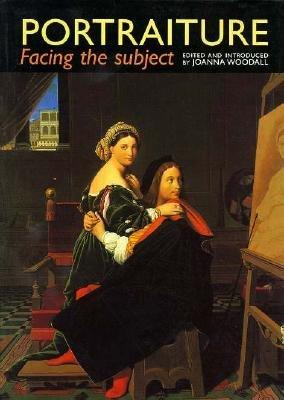
The cover of Portraiture: Facing the Subject, showing Ingres' painting Raphael and the Fornarina, c. 1814.

Joanna Woodall (born 1956) is an art historian at the Courtauld Institute of Art, London, where she is a specialist in portraiture and Netherlandish art.

== Education ==
Woodall has a BA degree in history from the University of York and an MA and PhD from the Courtauld Institute.

== Career ==
Woodall was a Speelman Fellow in Dutch and Flemish Art at Wolfson College, Cambridge, from 1980 to 1982, and an assistant curator at Christ Church Picture Gallery, Oxford, from 1982 to 1985. She spent a year on a Leverhulme Fellowship at the University of Leiden.

She has been at the Courtauld Institute of Art since 1986 where she specialises in portraiture and Netherlandish art. Woodall has also been a member of the editorial board of the Nederlands Kunsthistorisch Jaarboek (Netherlands Yearbook for History of Art) (until 2023).

== Protests ==
In 2010, Woodall was with a group of Courtauld students protesting about increased university tuition fees when they reportedly received rough treatment from the Metropolitan Police with Woodall herself being picked up by an officer and thrown into a group of protestors.

== Selected publications ==
- Portraiture: Facing the Subject. Manchester University Press, Manchester, 1997. (Editor) ISBN 0719046149
- "Wtewael's Perseus and Andromeda: looking for love in seventeenth century Dutch painting" in C. Arscott and K. Scott eds., Manifestations of Venus. Art and Sexuality, Manchester University Press, Manchester, 2000.
- Self Portrait. Renaissance to Contemporary. National Portrait Gallery, London and Art Gallery of New South Wales, Sydney, 2005. (With Anthony Bond, Timothy J. Clark, Ludmilla J. Jordanova and Joseph Leo Koerner) ISBN 1855143569
- Anthonis Mor. Art and Authority. Studies in Netherlandish Art and Cultural History Volume 8. Waanders Press, Zwolle, 2007. (With Tony Bond) ISBN 9789040084218
- "A Woman's Place. Joanna Woodall 1982-1985", in Jacqueline Thalmann (ed.), 40 Years of Christ Church Picture Gallery. Still one of Oxford’s best kept secrets. 2008.
- Nederlands Kunsthistorisch Jaarboek 59 (2009): Envisioning the Artist in the Early Modern Netherlands. Edited with H. Perry Chapman. 2010.

== See also ==
- Women in the art history field
