= Virginia Tovar Martín =

Spanish art historian, professor

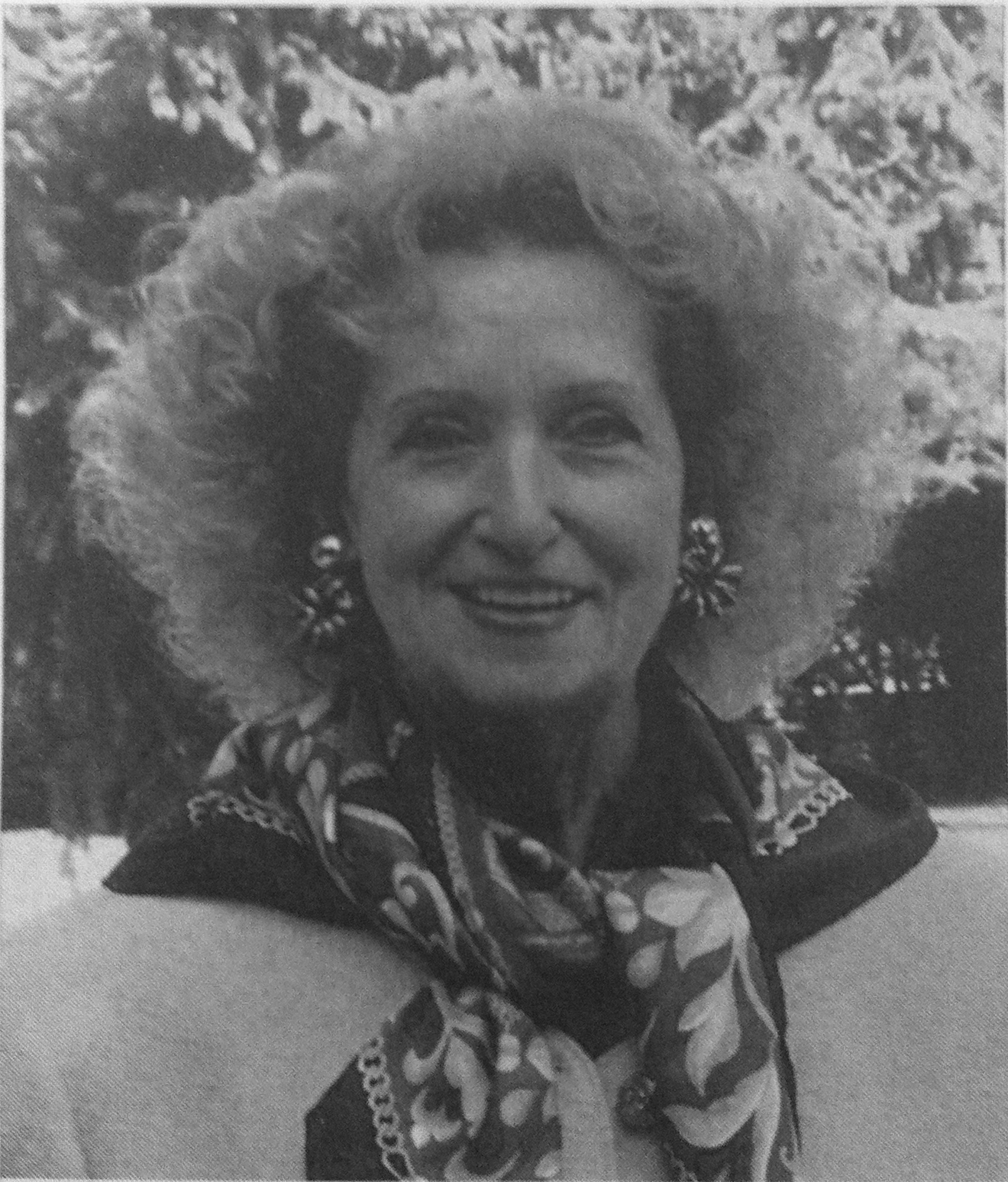
- Born: 29 November 1929; Bérchules, Andalusia, Spain
- Died: 10 July 2013 (aged 83); Galapagar, Madrid, Spain
- Other names: V. Tovar Martin, Virginia Goods Martín, Virginia Tovar, Virginia Tovar-Martin
- Education: Complutense University of Madrid
- Occupations: Art historian, author, professor
- Years active: 1972–2013
- Known for: Architecture and urban planning of Madrid during the Baroque period

Virginia Tovar Martín (1929–2013) was a Spanish art historian, author, and professor. She was a foremost scholar in the study of architecture and urban planning of Madrid during the Baroque period (c. 1600–1750). Tovar Martín was a Professor of History of Art at the Complutense University of Madrid; and at Autonomous University of Madrid.

== Biography ==
Virginia Tovar Martín was born on 29 November 1929 in Bérchules, Andalusia, Spain. She received her PhD in 1975 from Complutense University of Madrid, where she studied under the supervision of Alfonso Pérez Sánchez.

In her early scholarly work she focused on architect Juan Gómez de Mora. In 1986, she curated an exhibition of Juan Gómez de Mora's work. Tovar Martín emphasized the importance of 18th century Spanish art and architecture, and she felt Spanish art of this time period deserved a place within the canon of Western art. Tovar Martín was a member of the Institute of Madrid Studies (Spanish: Instituto de Estudios Madrileños), and the San Damaso Academy (Spanish: Academia de San Dámaso).

Tovar Martín died on 10 July 2013 in the town of Galapagar.

== Publications ==
- Tovar Martín, Virginia (1975). Arquitectos Madrileños de la Segunda mitad del siglo XVII [Architects from Madrid in the Second Half of the 17th Century] (dissertation). Complutense University of Madrid.
- Tovar Martín, Virginia (1980). Los Cinco Gremios de Madrid [The Five Guilds of Madrid]. Artes Graficas y Ediciones.
- Tovar Martín, Virginia (1982). El Real Pósito de la Villa de Madrid: historia de su construcción durante los siglos XVII y XVIII [The Royal Deposit of the Town of Madrid: History of its Construction During the 17th and 18th Centuries]. Cámara de Comercio e Industria de Madrid. ISBN 9788450081602.
- Tovar Martín, Virginia (1983). Arquitectura madrileña del S. XVII: datos para su estudio [Madrid Architecture of the 17th Century: Data for its Study]. Volume 3 of Serie Estudios, El Madrid de los Austrias. Instituto de Estudios Madrileños. ISBN 9788400055547.
- Tovar Martín, Virginia (1986). El Palacio del Ministerio de Justicia y Sus Obras de Arte [The Palace of the Ministry of Justice and its Works of Art]. Ministerio de Justicia. ISBN 9788450539981.
- Tovar Martín, Virginia (1988). La Casa de Correos: un Edificio en la Ciudad [The Post Office: a Building in the City]. Vol. 1. Comunidad de Madrid, Consejería de Política Territorial. ISBN 9788445100745.
- Tovar Martín, Virginia (1989). El Siglo XVIII Español [The Spanish Eighteenth Century]. Historia del Arte, 34.
- Tovar Martín, Virginia; Martín González, Juan José (1990). El Arte del Barroco: arquitectura y escultura [The Art of the Baroque: Architecture and Sculpture]. Conceptos Fundamentales en la Historia del Arte Español. Tarus. ISBN 9788430601967.
- Tovar Martín, Virginia (2000). Historia Breve de la Arquitectura Barroca de la Comunidad de Madrid [Brief History of Baroque Architecture in the Community of Madrid]. Electa. ISBN 9788481563054.
- Tovar Martín, Virginia; Valverde Merino, José Luis; González Alarcón, María Teresa; Soria Carreras, Santiago; Soler Villalobos, María Paz (2005). Palacio Real de Aranjuez [Royal Palace of Aranjuez]. Los Reales Sitios. Ministerio de la Educación y Ciencia: Ministerio de la Educación y Ciencia. ISBN 9788495163868.
- Tovar Martín, Virginia; Marín Tovar, Cristóbal (2009). El Palacio Parcent [The Parcent Palace]. Ministerio de Justicia. ISBN 9788477871217.

== See also ==
- Women in the art history field
