= Julie Crooks =

Canadian curator

- Born: England
- Education: St. Joseph's College School, York University, SOAS University of London
- Occupations: Curator/Head, Arts of Global Africa and the Diaspora
- Employer: Art Gallery of Ontario
- Family: Charmaine Crooks (sister-in-law)

Julie Crooks is a Canadian curator, researcher and instructor. She has been the head of the department of Arts of Global Africa and the Diaspora at the Art Gallery of Ontario since its founding in 2020.

== Biography ==
Crooks was born in England and is the sister-in-law of athlete Charmaine Crooks. She emigrated to Canada with her family in 1968 where she attended St. Joseph's College School. She completed an undergraduate degree in interdisciplinary studies and a MA in English Literature at York University. Crooks completed her PhD at SOAS University of London in 2014. Her research is focused on Sierra Leone, West Africa, and the African diaspora. After completing her studies she was a Rebanks Post Doctoral Fellow at the Royal Ontario Museum from 2014 to 2016. During that time, she co-curated the exhibit Here We Are Here: Black Canadian Contemporary Art with African collection curator Silvia Forni and Haitian-born researcher Dominique Fontaine. The exhibit has since traveled to the Montreal Museum of Fine Arts and the Art Gallery of Nova Scotia.

Crooks joined the Art Gallery of Ontario (AGO) as Assistant Curator of Photography in 2017. She curated her first exhibit Free Black North the same year. Featuring photographs from the Archives of Ontario and Brock University's Archives & Special Collections, the exhibit focused on the lives of descents of Black refugees and formally enslaved people from the United States living in southern Ontario during the mid-to-late 1800s. She also worked an exhibit called Ears, Eyes, Voice: Black Canadian Photojournalists 1970s-1990s’. In 2018, Crooks worked with Mickalene Thomas on a solo exhibit of the visual artist's work. As photography curator, she played an integral role in the acquisition of the Montgomery Collection, which consists of more than 3,500 of historical images documenting life in the Caribbean islands. This collection is possibly the largest collection of photographs from the Caribbean islands. She is a co-founder of the Black Curators Forum, which was launched in 2019 and supports Black curators in Canada. She is also a founding member of Black Artists Network in Dialogue (BAND) and has curated exhibits for them.

In 2020, the AGO named Crooks as head of the newly established department of Arts of Global Africa and the Diaspora aimed at developing collections from the African continent and its diaspora.

Crooks was one of three individuals chosen as a jury sitter for the 2020 Middlebrook Prize for Young Canadian Curators. In this role, she was tasked with selecting an artist to receive the prize of a space for their submitted exhibition or honorarium.

== Publications ==
- Crooks, Julie (2014). Alphonso Lisk-Carew: early photography in Sierra Leone. doi:10.25501/SOAS.00018564 – via academia.edu.

== See also ==
- Women in the art history fields
