= Los Angeles 1955–1985: A Birth of an Artistic Capital =

Los Angeles 1955–1985: Birth of an Art Capital was a historical exhibition detailing the emergence of Los Angeles as a post-war arts capital, organized by Catherine Grenier for the Centre Georges Pompidou in 2006. The exhibition was thought to be a watershed for Los Angeles' reception as a serious center of contemporary art, as described by then-curator at the Los Angeles County Museum of Art Carol S Eliel:

Organized in Paris by a major museum with a large and international audience, it could not be considered local or boosterish, but rather was seen as the fourth in a series of major, critically acclaimed Pompidou shows that focused on international centers of cutting-edge artistic activity earlier in the twentieth century: Paris–New York, Paris–Berlin, and Paris–Moscow.

The exhibition showed, among other things, the dominant role people in Los Angeles had in the progression of the feminist art movement.

The exhibition is also somewhat infamous, as two works (a 1971 wall sculpture by Peter Alexander and 1967 wall relief by Craig Kauffman) were destroyed because of poor handling at two separate moments during the show's run.
