= Leila Cook Barber =

American art historian and professor

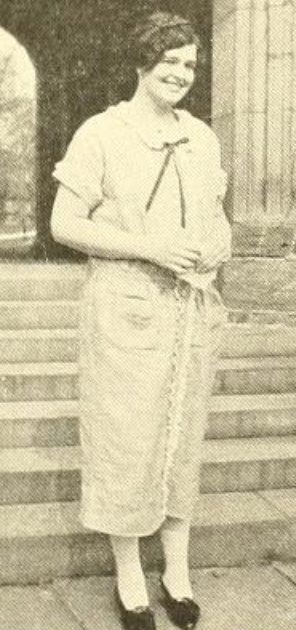
- Leila Cook Barber, from the 1925 Bryn Mawr College yearbook
- Born: January 4, 1903; Chicago, Illinois, US
- Died: December 4, 1984 (aged 81); Poughkeepsie, New York, US
- Other name: Leila Barber
- Occupations: professor, art historian
- Known for: Renaissance art and Medieval art

Academic background
- Education: Bryn Mawr College (AB); Radcliffe College (MA)

Leila Cook Barber (January 4, 1903 – December 4, 1984) was an American art historian and professor, specializing in the Renaissance art and Medieval studies. She was a Professor Emeritus at Vassar College, where she taught from 1931 until 1968.

== Biography ==
Leila Cook Barber was born January 4, 1903, in Chicago, Illinois, to parents Leila Cook and Courtenay Barber (1877–1951). Her father Courtenay Barber was active in many of the churches in Chicago including the Brotherhood of St. Andrew and served as a trustee of the Seabury Western Seminary. Barber had two siblings.

She received a B.A. degree in Art History in 1925 from Bryn Mawr College, studying under Georgiana Goddard King. She received a M.A. degree from Radcliffe College in 1928.

In 1931, Barber joined the Vassar College Art Department as their third art historian, where she remained until her retirement in 1968. She served as the Chair of the Art Department from 1965 until 1968. During her time at Vassar starting in 1935, she lived in Josselyn House, serving as the Head Resident and later as a House Fellow.

Barber was a member of the College Art Association of America, The Renaissance Society of America, and the Friends of Vassar Art Gallery.

She died December 4, 1984, at Vassar Brothers Hospital in Poughkeepsie, New York, at the age of 81.

== See also ==
- Women in the art history field
