= Hélène de Monferrand =

French novelist

Hélène de Montferrand (born 1947 Saint-Mandé) is a French novelist.

She grew up in Algeria and studied at Nanterre and at the Sorbonne. Her work continues and "resonates with echoes" the work of Jeanne Galzy. She received the Goncourt prize for a first novel (not to be mistaken with the Prix Goncourt) in 1990 for Les amies d'Héloïse. The novel is an exchange of letters. She contributes regularly to the Lesbia magazine.

== Biography ==
Hélène de Monferrand was born on October 2, 1947, in Saint-Mandé. She spent her childhood in French Algeria in Sidi-bel-Abbès, before returning to Metropolitan France in 1958. She studied literature at Nanterre and the Sorbonne.

Her novel Les Amies d'Héloïse (Héloïse's Friends) won the Prix Goncourt for first novels in 1990. This novel was followed by Le Journal de Suzanne (Suzanne's Diary) and Les Enfants d'Héloïse (Héloïse's Children).

She regularly contributes to the monthly magazine Lesbia Magazine as a literary critic. In 1997, she wrote the preface to the reissue of La Surprise de vivre by Jeanne Galzy.

With Elula Perrin, she has written two Crime fiction: L'Habit ne fait pas la nonne (Clothes Don't Make the Nun) and Ne tirez pas sur la violoniste (Don't Shoot the Violinist). She also writes short stories for the anthologies Histoires qui fondent sous la langue… (Stories That Melt in Your Mouth), Le Début de la fin / La Fin du début (The Beginning of the End / The End of the Beginning), Belles d'époque (Beauties of the Era) and Transports amoureux (Transported by Love).

== Works ==
- Sonate royale, poèmes, Paris, les Paragraphes littéraires de Paris, 1970
- Les Amies d'Héloïse, roman, Ed. de Fallois, Paris, 1990
- Journal de Suzanne, roman, Ed. de Fallois, Paris, 1991, ISBN 978-2-87706-118-6
- Les Enfants d'Héloïse, Double interligne, Paris, 1997 ; la Cerisaie, Paris, 2002
- Avec Elula Perrin, L'Habit ne fait pas la nonne, Paris, Double interligne, 1998
- Avec Elula Perrin, Ne tirez pas sur la violoniste, Paris, Double interligne, 1999
- Retour à Sarcelles, roman des temps prolétariens, Paris, la Cerisaie : 2004
