= Helen Woodruff (art historian) =

American art historian (1899–1980)

- Born: Helen Marion Woodruff; September 25, 1899; Elgin, Illinois, U.S.
- Died: March 27, 1980 (aged 80); Hightstown, New Jersey, U.S.
- Education: Wellesley College, Radcliffe College (MA, PhD)
- Occupations: Art historian, manuscript scholar, curator, writer, educator
- Spouse: Daniel Crane Taylor (div.)

Helen Marion Woodruff (September 25, 1899 – March 27, 1980) American art historian, manuscript scholar, curator, writer, and educator. She is known for her study of European medieval history and Christian art. Woodruff was a professor of archaeology at Princeton University.

== Early life and education ==
Helen Marion Woodruff was born on September 25, 1899, in Elgin, Illinois. Her parents were Marion Francis (née Eaton; 1859–1939) and Charles H. Woodruff (1855–1911), and their daughter Helen was the youngest of three daughters.

In the 1920s she received an Archaeological Institute of America (AIA) Fellowship in Mediaeval and Renaissance Archaeology.

Woodruff graduated in 1922 with a BA degree from Wellesley College in Massachusetts; and received a MA degree and a PhD degree in 1929 at Radcliffe College in Cambridge, Massachusetts. Her dissertation was on the illustrated manuscripts of Prudentius.

== Career ==
Woodruff was hired in 1931 as the Reader at the Index of Christian Art (now Index of Medieval Art) at Princeton University, a program founded by Charles Rufus Morey. From 1933 until 1942, she served as the director of the Index of Christian Art. During her directorship, Woodruff expanded on Morey's work and established a photo studio and created a set of written standards for iconographic description, much of which is still used by scholars.

She wrote several articles for the art bulletin at Princeton University. Her PhD dissertation was published as a monograph version in 1930 by Harvard University Press.

Woodruff left the Index to join the women’s reserve of the United States Navy (called Women Accepted for Volunteer Emergency Service or “WAVES”) during World War II.

== Death and legacy ==
Woodruff died in a care home on March 27, 1980, in Hightstown, New Jersey.

She is the namesake of the Helen M. Woodruff Fellowship of the Archaeological Institute of America and the American Academy in Rome.

== Publications ==
- Woodruff, Helen (1930). The Illustrated Manuscripts of Prudentius. Harvard University Press.
- Woodruff, Helen; Princeton University Art Museum (1942). The Index of Christian Art at Princeton University. Princeton University Press.

== See also ==
- Women in the art history field
