= Charles Rufus Morey =

American historian and professor (1877–1955)

- Born: November 20, 1877; Hastings, Michigan, U.S.
- Died: August 28, 1955 (aged 77); Princeton, New Jersey, U.S.
- Education: University of Michigan
- Occupations: Art historian, lecturer, librarian

Charles Rufus Morey (November 20, 1877 – August 28, 1955) was an American art historian, professor, and chairman of the Department of Art and Archaeology at Princeton University from 1924 to 1945. He had expertise in medieval art and founded the Index of Christian Art (now the Index of Medieval Art) at Princeton University in 1917. He was one of the founders of the College Art Association.

== Biography ==
Born in Hastings, Michigan, in 1877, Morey graduated from the University of Michigan in 1899. After receiving a master's degree there in Classics he went on to study for three years at the American School of Classical Studies in Rome, publishing his first article, "The Christian Sarcophagus in S. Maria Antiqua" in 1905.

Morey became an instructor in classics at Princeton University in 1903, but on a colleague's request, namely Allan Marquand, he switched to the Department of Art and Archaeology, in which he began a career of 39 years in art history. Upon Marquand's death in 1924, Morey assumed his position as chairman of this department at Princeton University. Medieval iconography was a major topic of interest to Morey, leading him to draw up an image collection in 1917 of late antique, early Christian-era, and medieval works of art, a collection which would blossom into a cataloged collection of photographs known as the Index of Christian Art. Considered to be "indebted to photography", Morey's stance on the process of iconographic analysis has been attributed by scholars as contributing substantially to the formulation of Erwin Panofsky’s methodology of subject analysis. In 1929 Morey began cataloging the collection of the Museo Cristiano, part of the Vatican Library. During his lifetime, Morey made many trips back and forth to Rome to develop collections in the Vatican and established the Antioch archaeological excavation of Daphne. Morey was noted for his work in helping establish various libraries and indexing image systems. In 1932, he published a pamphlet on scholarly library planning, named the "Laboratory-Library,". In 1938, Morey was named Marquand Chair of Art and Archaeology at Princeton University.

Following the end of World War II, Morey resigned at Princeton and held the first appointment of Cultural Attaché to the American Embassy in Rome. Morey was the acting director of the American Academy from 1945-1947. Morey also helped establish the College Art Association in 1911 and its primary publication, The Art Bulletin.

== Publications ==
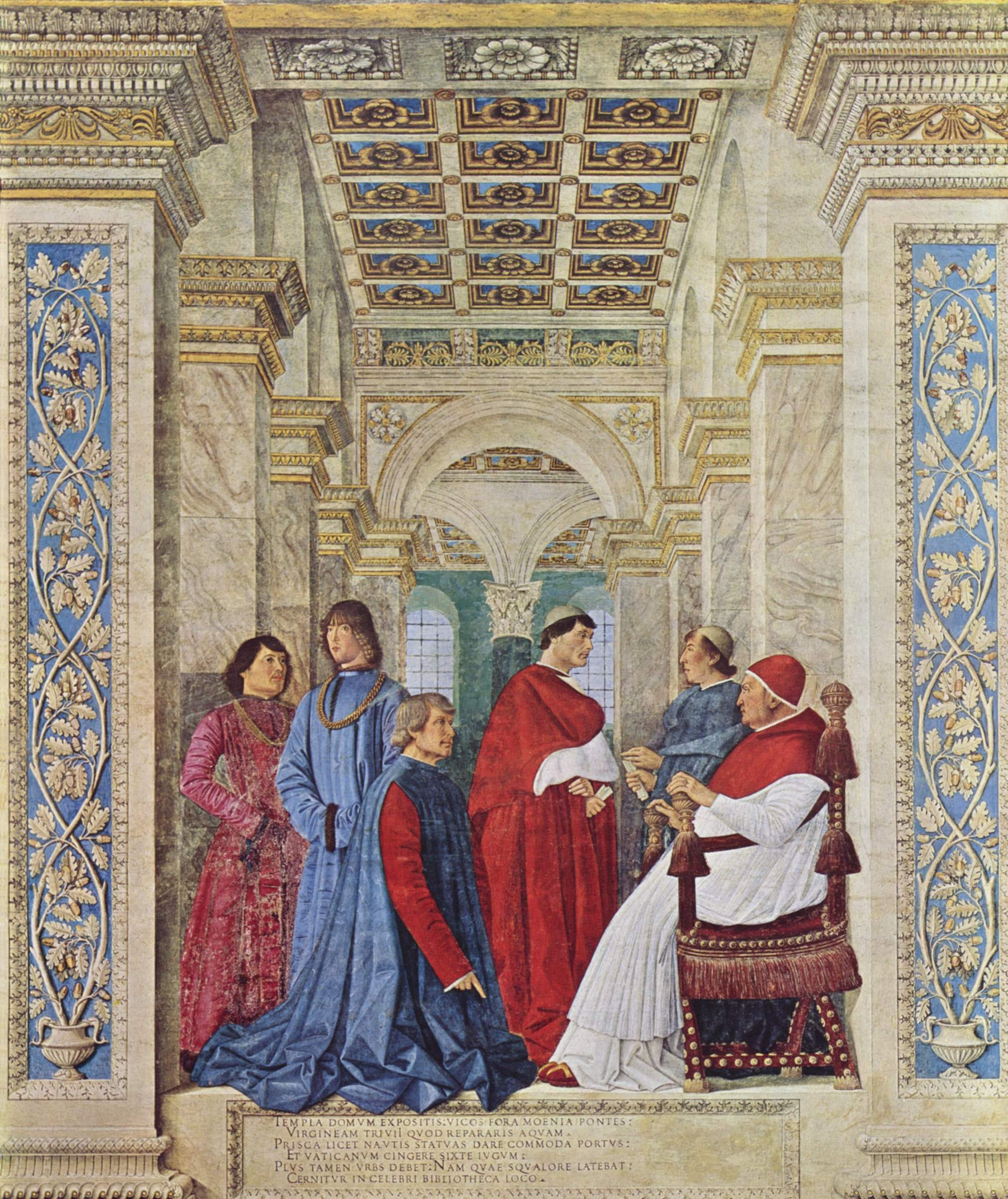
Morey was noted for his cataloging of medieval Christian art. Display in the Vatican Library shown.

During his career as an art historian, Morey published many notable papers and manuscripts related to early and medieval Christian art. These include East Christian paintings in the Freer collection (1914), Lost mosaics and frescoes of Rome of the mediaeval period (1915), The American society for the excavation of Sardis (1924), Roman and Christian sculpture (1924), Studies in the late antique undertaken in the School of Classical Studies of the American Academy of Rome, 1925-1926. (1927), The Gospel book of Landevennec (the Harkness Gospels) in the New York Public Library (1931), Christian art (1935), The mosaics of Antioch (1938), Early Christian art (1942), Mediaeval art (1942), Christian art (1958), The gold-glass collection of the Vatican Library (1959).

== Death and legacy ==
He died in 1955 in Princeton, New Jersey. German-Jewish art historian Erwin Panofsky said of Morey; "No one can number those who . . . owed to him their place in the world, their scale of values, their sense of direction in life. No one who knew him can forget the brief, warm smile that could suddenly illumine his strong, often stern-looking face and give confidence to the timid and courage to the troubled."(M. Stohlman, A Princeton Companion, 1978, s.v. Morey, Charles Rufus)

The Charles Rufus Morey Book Award was established in honor of Morey's name by the College Art Association. This award honors distinguished literature in the history of art annually September 1 to August 31.

== See also ==
- Helen Woodruff (art historian)
