= Catherine Grenier =

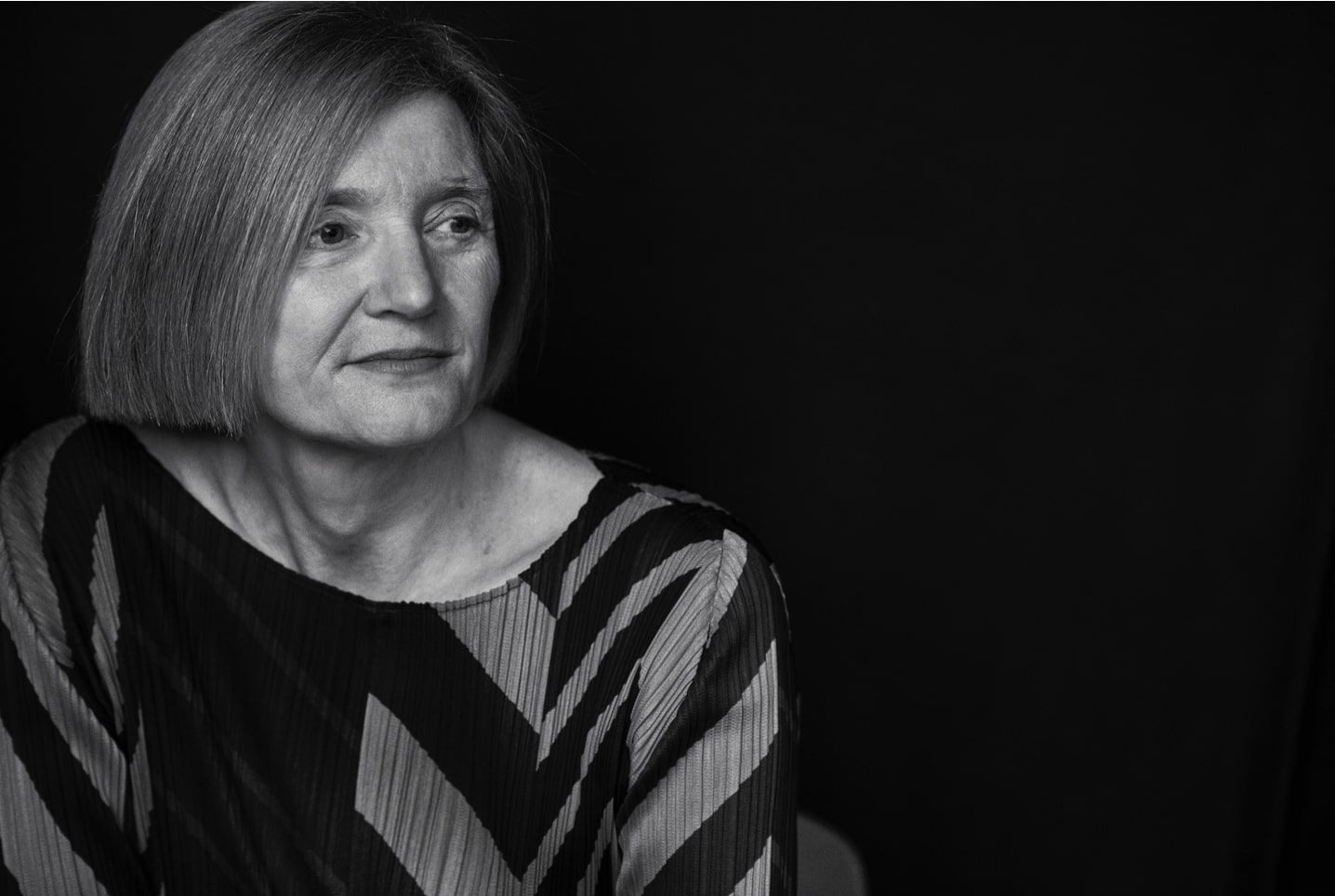
Catherine Grenier

Catherine Grenier (*1960) is the Director of the Giacometti Foundation since 2014.

== Career ==
Grenier was working for the French Ministry of Culture before starting her tenure at the Centre Pompidou.

In 2006 she organized Los Angeles 1955–1985: A Birth of an Artistic Capital, a historical exhibition detailing the emergence of Los Angeles as a post-war arts capital, for the Centre Pompidou. The exhibition was thought to be a watershed for Los Angeles' reception as a serious center of contemporary art, as described by then-curator at the Los Angeles County Museum of Art Carol S Eliel:

Organized in Paris by a major museum with a large and international audience, it could not be considered local or boosterish, but rather was seen as the fourth in a series of major, critically acclaimed Pompidou shows that focused on international centers of cutting-edge artistic activity earlier in the twentieth century: Paris–New York, Paris–Berlin, and Paris–Moscow.

In 2014 Grenier was appointed director of the Annette and Alberto Giacometti Foundation, after failing to become director of the Centre Pompidou. She is also credited with helping bridge the divide in Giacometti's legacy that formed following the death of his widow in 1993.

As chief heritage curator of the French Ministry of Culture, Grenier curated the 2017 Picasso-Giacometti exhibition at Qatar’s Fire Station Gallery. In 2018, Grenier became director of a newly opened institute researching Giacometti's work.

Grenier is the Director of Concept at the Art Mill Museum in Doha. In 2025, she was a member of the advisory panel that chose Lina Ghotmeh as architect of the Qatari Pavilion at the Venice Biennale.

== Exhibitions and publications ==
Grenier has organized exhibitions such as "Abracadabra", focusing on the fantasy of art at the Tate Modern in 1999, "Les années pop" (The Pop Years) in 2001, "The Big Bang" in 2005 and "Los Angeles 1955-1985" in 2006.

Grenier wrote “The Possible Life Of Christian Boltanski” based on Interviews she had with Boltanski in 2004.
