= Julie Oeming Badiee =

American art historian, educator (1947–2001)

- Born: Julie Anne Oeming; March 30, 1947; Saginaw, Michigan, United States
- Died: May 20, 2001 (aged 54); Westminster, Maryland, United States
- Burial place: Pipe Creek Church of the Brethren Cemetery, Union Bridge, Maryland, U.S.
- Other names: Julie Oeming, Julie Badiee
- Education: University of Michigan (BA, MA, PhD)
- Occupations: Art historian, educator, academic administrator
- Known for: Islamic art history
- Spouse: Heshmatollah Badiee (m. 1972–2001; her death)
- Children: 1

Julie Oeming Badiee (née Julie Anne Oeming; 1947 – 2001) was an American art historian, educator, and academic administrator. She taught at Western Maryland College (now McDaniel College) for 22 years, and specialized in the study of Islamic art. She was of the Baháʼí Faith, and also did related scholarly work.

== Early life and education ==
Julie Oeming Badiee was born as Julie Anne Oeming on March 30, 1947, in Saginaw, Michigan. Her parents were Marilyn (née McKeever) and Joseph Albert Oeming. She graduated in 1965 from Arthur Hill High School.

Badiee attended the University of Michigan, and received a B.A. degree in 1969 in German, a M.A. degree in 1971, and a doctorate degree in 1978 in art history. Her dissertation was titled An Islamic Cosmography : The Illustrations of the Sarre Qazwīnī (1978).

== Career ==
Badiee taught from 1971 to 1973 at the Saginaw Valley State College (now Saginaw Valley State University).

Badiee was a member of the Baháʼí Faith since 1970. In 1972, she married Heshmatollah "Heshmat" Badiee from Iran in a Baháʼí marriage ceremony. Together they had one daughter. They were members of the Assembly of the Baháʼí of Westminster. Additionally she did scholarly work on the Baháʼí.

She taught at Western Maryland College (now McDaniel College) in Westminster, Maryland from 1978 until her death in 2001. While teaching Islamic art history at Western Maryland College in 1980 she received a note on her desk that read "death to Iran", during the Iran hostage crisis. In 1984, she was promoted to associate professor, and was the chairman of the art and art history department from 1984 until 1992. Badiee was awarded in 1996 the first Ira G. Zepp Distinguished Teaching Award from Western Maryland College.

== Death and legacy ==
She died of a cancerous brain tumor on May 20, 2001, in Westminster, Maryland. A study abroad scholarship was named in her memory at Western Maryland College, seven months after her death. She was survived by her husband and daughter. Her daughter Andaleeb Badiee Banta is also an art historian.

== See also ==
- Women in the art history field
