= Helen Hills =

British art historian and academic (born 1960)

Professor Helen Hills
- Born: 1960 (age 65–66)

Academic background
- Education: University of Oxford, Courtauld Institute of Art

Academic work
- Discipline: History of Art

Helen Hills (born 1960) is a British art historian and academic. She was appointed Anniversary Reader of Art History at the University of York in 2005 and promoted to Professor of History of Art in 2008, making her the first woman professor of Art History there.

Prior to this, Hills taught at the Universities of Keele and Manchester in the UK, at Queen's University in Canada and at the University of North Carolina at Chapel Hill. She has published numerous books and articles on art and architectural history. She has particular research interests in the baroque, and was a guest contributor to the BBC radio programme In Our Time about The Baroque Movement in November 2008 and "Night Waves" on 'The Baroque'.

== Education and employment ==
Helen Hills was educated at Cambridgeshire High School for Girls (now Long Road Sixth Form College) and graduated with a Bachelor of Arts (BA) in Modern History from the University of Oxford. She gained both a Master of Arts (MA) (Distinction) and PhD in History of Art from the Courtauld Institute of Art, University of London; as she was finishing her PhD, she took a sessional appointment at Queen's University, Canada. She taught in the Adult Education Department at Keele University, and then accepted a position as Assistant Professor of Art History at University of North Carolina at Chapel Hill, USA.

Hills then returned to England to work initially as Junior Lecturer in History of Art at University of Manchester (1998–2005) before being promoted to Senior Lecturer. She joined the University of York in 2005 as Anniversary Reader in the History of Art. She was promoted to Professor of History of Art at the University of York in 2008. She was the first woman professor of History of Art at York.

== Awards and recognitions ==
- British Academy Conference Award 2020 for "The Matter of Silver" an international interdisciplinary conference July 2021
- Leverhulme Research Fellowship: 'Silver: Surface & Substance' 2018-19.
- Robert Lehman Visiting Professor, Villa I Tatti, The Harvard Center for Italian Renaissance Studies, Florence, Italy, 2017.
- Ruth and Clarence Kennedy Professor in Renaissance Studies: Smith College, Mass., US, 2014.
- Distinguished Visiting Professor University of Colorado Boulder, US, 2014.
- Distinguished Visiting Professor, Department of Art, Emory University, US, 2013.
- Millard Meiss Publication Award, 2011 for The Matter of Miracles.
- Scouloudi Historical Award publication grant, 2011 from the Scouloudi Foundation in association with the Institute of Historical Research for The Matter of Miracles.
- Distinguished Visiting Professor at the Stockholm University, Sweden: 2008.
- Weiss/Brown Publication Subvention Award, 2004 for Invisible City: The Architecture of Devotion in Seventeenth-Century Neapolitan Convents.
- Best Book Prize, 2004, the Society for the Study of Early Modern Women (US) awarded to Invisible City: The Architecture of Devotion in Seventeenth-Century Neapolitan Convents.

== Publications ==
Helen Hills has published numerous books and articles on art and architectural history, including:

- Helen Hills (ed), Silver: Transformational Matter, published for the British Academy by Oxford University Press, Proceedings of the British Academy 258, 2023, ISBN 9780197267547
- The Matter of Miracles: Neapolitan Baroque Architecture and Sanctity (Manchester University Press, 2016) ISBN 9780719084744
- New Approaches to Naples (Routledge, 2013) ISBN 9781409429432
- Rethinking the Baroque (Ashgate, 2011 and Routledge, 2016) ISBN 9781138249424
- Representing Emotions: New Connections in the Histories of Art, Music and Medicine, (Ashgate, 2005) ISBN 9781351904155
- Invisible City: The Architecture of Devotion in Seventeenth-Century Neapolitan Convents (Oxford University Press, 2004) ISBN 9780195117745
- Architecture and the Politics of Gender (Ashgate, 2003 and Routledge, 2017) ISBN 9781138275836
- Fabrications: New Art and Urban Memory in Manchester (Manchester: UMiM, 2002) ISBN 9780954369507
- Marmi Mischi Siciliani: Invenzione e Identità (Inlaid polychromatic marble decoration in early modern Sicily: Invention and identity) (Società Messinese di Storia Patria, 1999)

Hills edited Open Arts Journal, Issue 6: Baroque Naples: place and displacement, Winter 2017/8

== Other information ==
Helen Hills was a guest contributor to the BBC radio programme In Our Time on The Baroque Movement (ironically enough, as she does not believe in a 'baroque movement') in November 2008. Night Waves Invited discussant on the 'Baroque': 20 March 2013. Photographs contributed by Helen Hills to the Conway Library are currently being digitised by the Courtauld Institute of Art, as part of the Courtauld Connects project. Hills has received many grants and awards for her research including from the British Academy (many times), AHRC (multiple times), The Getty, and the British School at Rome (3 times).
