= Kim Sajet =

Dutch art director (born 1965)

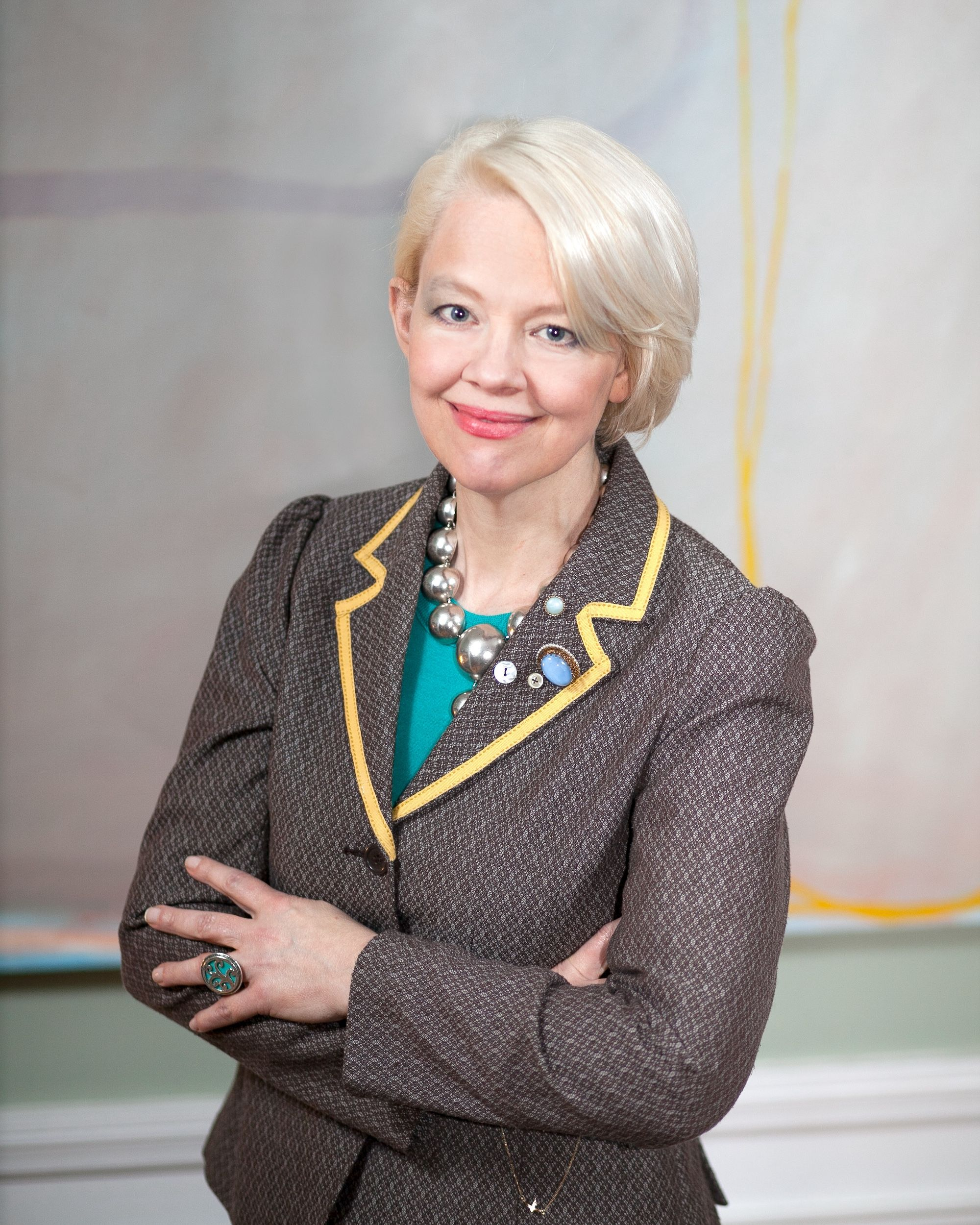
- Sajet in 2013
- Born: 1965 (age 60–61); Nigeria
- Education: University of Melbourne (BA, MBA); Deakin University (GrDip); Bryn Mawr College (MA); Georgetown University (DLS)
- Occupations: art historian, curator
- Website: Official website

Kim Sajet (/ˈseɪɛt/ SAY-et; born September 1965) is a Dutch art historian and curator who serves as the director of the Milwaukee Art Museum.

She was the director of the Smithsonian Institution's National Portrait Gallery for twelve years. Appointed in 2013, Sajet became the first woman to hold this post. During her tenure at the museum, she worked to increase representation of women and minorities in the Portrait Gallery's collection. In May 2025, Sajet's appointment was purportedly terminated by a directive from President Donald Trump. The following month, she resigned her post.

== Biography ==
Sajet was born to Dutch parents in Nigeria and raised in Australia from the age of four; she is a citizen of the Netherlands. She has a doctorate in liberal studies from Georgetown University, a Master's degree in art history from Bryn Mawr College, a master's degree in business administration, a bachelor's degree in art history from University of Melbourne, and a graduate diploma in museum studies from Deakin University.

Sajet served as director of the Monash Gallery of Art (now the Museum of Australian Photography) from 1993 to 1995, and deputy director of the Pennsylvania Academy of the Fine Arts between 2001 and 2007. She began as director of the Smithsonian's National Portrait Gallery in Washington, D.C., on April 1, 2013, following a stint as the president and CEO of the Historical Society of Pennsylvania.

In May 2025, President Donald Trump claimed to have fired Sajet due to her supposed support of DEI. Legal experts said such an order would have to come from Smithsonian Secretary Lonnie Bunch, as Sajet's position is appointed not by the president but by the Smithsonian Board of Regents. On June 13, Sajet resigned as director of the National Portrait Gallery.

In September 2025, she became the director of the Milwaukee Art Museum.

== See also ==
- Women in the art history field
