= Fondation Alberto et Annette Giacometti =

French public utility institution

The Fondation Alberto et Annette Giacometti is a French public utility institution created by a French Ministry of Culture decree of December 2003. Its purpose is the promotion, dissemination, preservation and protection of the works of Alberto Giacometti. It is headquartered in Paris, and is headed by Catherine Grenier, Chief Heritage Curator, of the French Ministry of Culture. It has since June 2018, a space for the exhibition and research of the work of the sculptor, the Giacometti Institute.

== History ==
The foundation is the sole beneficiary of the legacy of Annette Giacometti, his widow, deceased in 1993. Mrs. Giacometti appointed Roland Dumas, a lawyer and former French foreign minister, to be her executor. By the time Annette Giacometti died, the French government had not yet approved creation of the foundation. In 1994, reportedly to cover the cost of storage, insurance and legal fees, Dumas put 18 Giacometti works up for sale through the French auctioneer Jacques Tajan, raising the equivalent of some $8 million. In 2000, Annette Giacometti's brother, Michael Arm, asked a Paris court to annul his sister's will, prepared in January 1990, arguing that she was mentally incompetent at the time. In May 2007, Dumas received a 12-month jail sentence (suspended) for funds he mis-appropriated acting as executor of the will of Annette Giacometti.

The Foundation holds the world's largest collection of Giacometti's works: 95 paintings, 260 bronze sculptures, 550 plaster sculptures, and thousands of drawings and engravings. The Foundation also holds a large archive giving background to the artist's creations: numerous notebooks and sketchbooks, manuscripts for published texts, correspondence with other artists and intellectuals, as well as a large part of his private library, including reviews, books, exhibition catalogues, and newspapers, some of which have his annotations or drawings. It aims at establishing a comprehensive catalogue of the artist's works from the records started by his widow. It also organises exhibitions of works from its collection, and provides short and long-term loans to major museums and cultural institutions. The premises housing the collection are not open to the general public, however the entire collection is progressively being made available online.

In 2022, the foundation announced plans to open a museum in Paris in 2026. The museum, which is to include a school and provide a permanent home for several hundred works by Giacometti, will occupy 6,000 m^{2} (64,600 sq ft) of space in the former Invalides train station and the basement of the esplanade.

== Administration and implementation ==
The Foundation is administered by a nine-member board, including two French Government representatives (statutory members: the Minister of the Interior and the Minister of Culture and Communication and a member of the Fondation Alberto Giacometti at Zürich (Alberto Giacometti-Stiftung).

== Mission ==
The Foundation has a mission to protect, disseminate and promote Giacometti's works. Its activities include:

- Public display of works:

Holding a collection of over 5,000 works, the Foundation participates in many cultural activities, lectures, themed exhibitions, and conferences in cultural institutions around the world. It is involved in the publication, reproduction and editing of Alberto Giacometti's work.

- Conservation of the Alberto et Annette Giacometti archives
- Cataloguing the works
- Awards and scholarships
- Protection of the works both in France and abroad:

For this purpose, it monitors related publications, exhibitions and sales, and the sale of counterfeit works, attempting to remove them from the market and pursue the counterfeiters. It grants permission to display, edit and publish Giacometti's works. The foundation, in conjunction with members of Giacometti's family, has the right to produce new sculptures from the original plaster casts, completing the editions he began. Under French law, an artist or his heirs have the right to cast no more than 12 sculptures that are to be considered authentic. Giacometti cast most of his sculptures in editions of 6 and occasionally 8.

== Publications ==
- Wiesinger, Véronique; Leinz, Gottlieb, eds. (2010). Alberto Giacometti. Die Frau auf dem Wagen, Triumph und Tod [The lady in the carriage: triumph and death] (in English and German). Munich: Himmer Verlag. ISBN 978-3-7774-2411-8.
- Wiesinger, Véronique; Buren, Daniel; Blistene, Bernard, eds. (2010). Oeuvres contemporaines 1964-1966 [Contemporary works 1964–1966] (in French and English). Paris: Galerie Kamel Menour. ISBN 978-2-914171-36-6. Official catalogue of the same-named exhibition.
- Wiesinger, Véronique; Ansenk, Emily; Braschi, Cecilia, eds. (2008). Alberto Giacometti / Rotterdam Kunsthal 2008-2009. Rotterdam: Uitgeverij D'Jonge Hond. Official catalogue of the Kunsthal exhibition.
- Castellani, Valentina; Harrison, Martin; Wiesinger, Véronique (2008). Isabel and Other Intimate Strangers. New York: Gagosgian Gallery. ISBN 978-1-932598-78-0. Official catalogue.
- Giacometti, Alberto (29 September 2007). Écrits [Writings] (in French). Paris: Hermann. ISBN 978-2-7056-6703-0.
- Wiesinger, Véronique; Yamanashi, Toshio, eds. (2006). Alberto Giacometti. Tokyo. Official catalogue of the Japanese touring expedition.
