= Universities' China Committee in London =

Educational grant-giving charitable trust

The Universities’ China Committee in London (UCCL) is an educational grant-giving charitable trust established in 1925, and formalised by Royal Charter in 1932. Its mission is to provide for "two way flow of academic exchange between China and the UK", and "the encouragement of China-focused studies in the UK". The UCCL contributes towards The Great Britain-China Educational Trust (GBCET) Chinese Student Awards, which is a charitable fund supporting Chinese students' costs of study in the UK.

In addition to its contribution to GBCET, the UCCL also administers its own awards. Recipients of these awards are "Chinese scholars who seek to make research visits to the UK or to British-based scholars working on, or studying, relevant subjects at UK universities who wish to undertake visits to China for specific research or lecture reasons." It also supports academic conferences and the promotion and teaching of Chinese and other Chinese studies in the UK".

The present executive director of the UCCL is Lindsay Jones. Lindsay studied Japanese at Oxford University before embarking on a 20+ year career in finance, working in investment banking and hedge funds in London, Hong Kong, Sydney and Geneva.
