= Kamala Dongerkery =

Indian social worker and cultural historian

Kamala Sunderrao Kulkarni Dongerkery (1909–1992) was an Indian social worker, art historian, author, and cultural historian. She wrote books on Indian embroidery, Indian jewelry and Indian toys. She also wrote an autobiographical account of her life, On the wings of time (1968).

== Biography ==
Kamala Dongerkery was originally from Dharwar. She was married at the age of eleven, to the educationist S. R. Dongerkery (born 1898), later Vice Chancellor of Marathwada University. In her autobiography she recounted how she faced criticism from her mother-in-law for failing to produce a male child.

Inspired by Kamaladevi Chattopadhyaya, she began writing on the history of Indian clothing, as well as of other traditional arts and crafts. She was part of a revival of interest in Indian craft, motivated by aesthetic appreciation of its distinctiveness rather than as a Gandhian political statement.

She was a member of the All India Women's Conference and the National Council of Women. She was also a founder and chair of Balak Vrina Education Society, and on the Board of Film Censors.

== Works ==
- The Indian sari. New Delhi: All India Handicrafts Board, 1950.
- The romance of Indian embroidery. Bombay: Thacker, 1951.
- A journey through toyland. Bombay: Popular Book Depot, 1954.
- Traditional embroidery of India. New Delhi: All India Handicrafts Board, 1961.
- On Wings of Time. Bombay: Bharatiya Vidya Bhawan, 1968.
- Jewelry and personal adornment in India. New Delhi: Indian Council for Cultural Relations, 1970.
- Interior decoration in India past and present. Bombay: Taraporevala, 1973.
- India, yours and mine. New Delhi: Publications Division, Ministry of Information and Broadcasting, Government of India, 1976.
