= Catherine Gonnard =

French art critic, journalist, essayist and LGBTQ+ historian

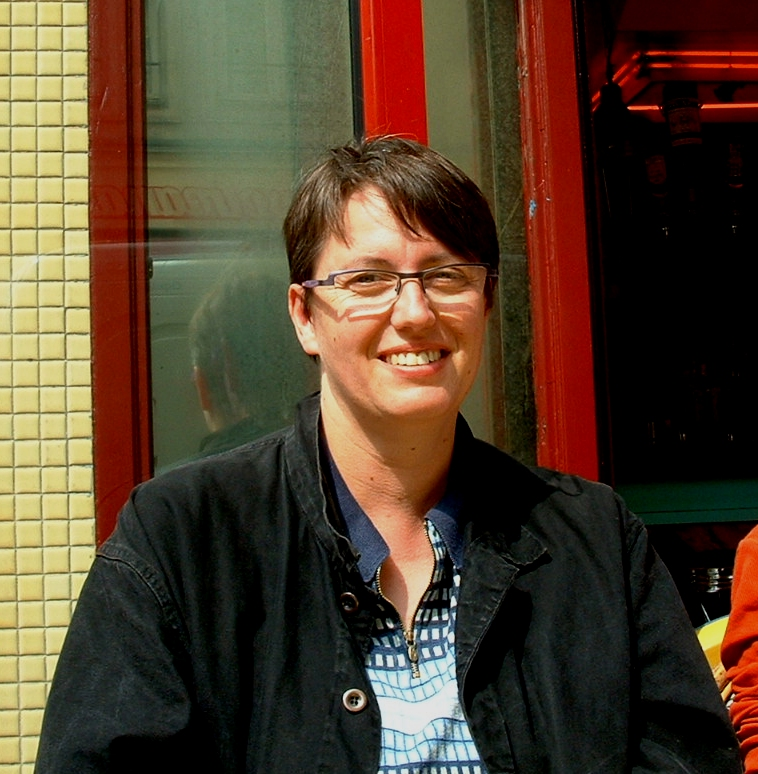
- Occupations: Art critic; journalist; essayist; historian

Catherine Gonnard is a French art critic, journalist, essayist and LGBTQ+ historian.

== Career ==
She worked at Homophonies and served as editor in chief of Lesbia Magazine.

With Elisabeth Lebovici she co-edited Femmes Artistes / Artistes Femmes: Paris, de 1880 à Nos Jours, which was published in 2007, and has authored or co-authored other pieces on the intersection of art and feminism.
