= Lottlisa Behling =

German art historian and botanist (1909-1989)

- Born: 15 July 1909; Neustettin, Pomerania, Germany
- Died: 9 January 1989 (aged 79)
- Occupations: Botanist, Art historian, University professor
- Notable work: Research in iconography

Lottlisa Behling (15 July 1909 – 9 January 1989) was a German art historian and botanist.

== Biography ==
Lottlisa Behling was born on 15 July 1909 in Neustettin, Pomerania. She was a double major in art history and botany at the universities of Greifswald, Halle and Berlin. She received her doctorate degree 1937 in Berlin. Her doctoral thesis was titled Das ungegenständliche Bauornament der Gotik. Versuch einer Geschichte des Maßwerks.

After graduation she worked at the Staatlichen Museen zu Berlin and became a professor for medieval art and ornaments at the University of Jena in 1953. Two years later she received her habilitation at the Humboldt-University Berlin and became associate director of the institute of art history at the university of Jena. In 1958, she left East Germany, and taught at the Friedrich-Alexander-Universität Erlangen-Nürnberg. Since 1960 she taught art history at the Ludwig-Maximilians-Universität München.

Her research focus were the iconography of plants in medieval art and late medieval drawing. Her publications Die Pflanzen in der mittelalterlichen Tafelmalerei and Die Pflanzenwelt der mittelalterlichen Kathedralen are considered reference books. and have been reviewed in the Theologische Literaturzeitung,

== Legacy ==
In Munich, the Lottlisa-Behling-Weg in Schwabing-Freimann is named after her.

== Publications (selection) ==
- Triumphkreuzgruppe der Danziger Marienkirche von 1517, ein Werk Meister Pauls von Danzig. In: Kunst. Bd. 1, 1948, ZDB-ID 214653-8, S. 36–47.
- Eine Jüngste-Gerichts-Darstellung und ein Tumbengrab aus der Parlerwerkstatt in Thüringen. In: Zeitschrift für Kunstwissenschaft. Bd. 2, Nr. 1/2, 1948, ISSN 0721-958X, S. 9–14.
- Zur Engeldarstellung in der deutschen Kunst um 1000. In: Beiträge zur christlichen Philosophie. Bd. 6, 1950, ISSN 0174-8440, S. 25–37.
- Die Passionstafeln vom Hochaltar der Predigerkirche zu Erfurt. In: Zeitschrift für Kunst Bd. 4, Nr. 3, 1950, ZDB-ID 202970-4, S. 188–204.
- Die "Schöne Madonna" von Arnstadt. In: Die Kunst und das schöne Heim. Bd. 48, Nr. 11, 1950, ISSN 0023-5423, S. 405–408.
- Der Hausbuchmeister – Erhard Rewich. In: Zeitschrift für Kunstwissenschaft. Bd. 5, Nr. 3/4, 1951, S. 179–80.
- Symmetrieprobleme in der bildenden Kunst. In: Wissenschaftliche Zeitschrift der Friedrich-Schiller-Universität Jena. Gesellschafts- und sprachwissenschaftliche Reihe. Bd. 2, Nr. 3, 1952/53, ISSN 0138-1652, S. 125–153.
- Die Freiberger Tulpenkanzel, eine Blume der Spätgotik. Ein Beitrag zum gegenständlichen Ornament der Spätgotik. In: Wissenschaftliche Zeitschrift der Friedrich-Schiller-Universität Jena. Gesellschafts- und sprachwissenschaftliche Reihe. Bd. 3, Nr. 4/5, 1953/54, S. 471–77.
- Die Freiberger Tulpenkanzel, ein Gewächs der Spätgotik. In: Die Kunst und das schöne Heim. Bd. 52, Nr. 6, 1954, S. 211–213.
- Die klugen und die törichten Jungfrauen zu Magdeburg. Nachträge und Ergänzungen zur Erforschung der Magdeburger Skulpturen. In: Zeitschrift für Kunstwissenschaft. Bd. 8, Nr. 1/2, 1954, S. 19–42.
- Die Handzeichnungen des Mathis Gothart Nithart genannt Grünewald. Böhlau, Weimar 1955.
- Die Pflanze in der mittelalterlichen Tafelmalerei. Böhlau, Köln, Graz 1957.
- Die Pflanzenwelt der mittelalterlichen Kathedralen. Böhlau, Köln u. a. 1964.
- Matthias Grünewald. Langewiesche, Königstein im Taunus 1969.
