= Mika Natif =

American art historian

- Education: New York University, Indiana University, Bloomington
- Occupation: Art Historian

Mika Natif is an Israeli-born American scholar of art history specializing in art of the Islamic World, especially Mughal art. Dr. Natif currently serves as an Associate Professor in Art History at the George Washington University. She has previously held a post-doctorate at the College of the Holy Cross and did curatorial work at the Harvard Art Museums on Islamic and Later Indian Art. Dr. Natif is a co-editor of Eros and Sexuality in Islamic Art.

She received her M.A. in 2001 from Princeton University.

== Bibliography ==
- Natif, Mika (2018). Mughal occidentalism: artistic encounters between Europe and Asia at the courts of India, 1580-1630. Studies in Persian cultural history. Leiden; Boston: Brill. ISBN 978-90-04-37499-7.
