= Judith K. Brodsky =

Feminist artist, art historian, curator

- Born: 1933 (age 92–93); Providence, Rhode Island, US
- Education: Radcliffe College; Harvard University; Tyler School of Art and Architecture, Temple University
- Employer(s): Beaver College; Rutgers University
- Organization: Women's Caucus for Art

Judith Kapstein Brodsky (born 1933) is an American artist, curator, and author known for her contributions to feminist discourse in the arts. She received her B.A. from Harvard University where she majored in Art History, and an M.F.A. from Tyler School of Art at Temple University. She is Professor Emerita in the Department of Visual Arts at Rutgers, State University of New Jersey. A printmaker herself, Brodsky is founding Director of the Rutgers Center for Innovative Print and Paper in 1996, later renamed the Brodsky Center in her honor in September 2006, and which later joined the Philadelphia Academy of Fine Arts (PAFA) in 2018. She was also co-founder, with Ferris Olin, of the Center for Women in the Arts and Humanities at Rutgers University in 2006. She was the first artist appointed as president of the Women's Caucus for Art, an active Affiliated Society of the College Art Association.

== Biography ==
Brodsky was born in 1933 in Providence, Rhode Island. She studied Art History at Radcliffe College, where she graduated in 1954. Married in her junior year of college, as a wife and mother later living in Princeton, New Jersey, Brodsky is said to have "drawn a circle" on a map around her home to determine how far away she could go to school and still return home by the time her children returned from school. That circle led Brodsky to Temple University's Tyler School of Art and Architecture. Her feminist actions began early, in 1960 while at Tyler, where she helped found FOCUS, a festival celebrating women artists. The festival drew such renowned artists as feminist artist Judy Chicago and abstract expressionist Lee Krasner. Presciently, the festival's success sowed discontent among male artists: “We got sued,” Brodsky recalls, “by a male artist who said he couldn’t get a show during that period because the galleries were only showing women.”

She was Chairperson of the Art Department at Beaver College, Jenkintown, Pennsylvania before coming to Rutgers University in 1978. She retired in 2001 as Distinguished Professor Emerita in the Department of Visual Arts at Rutgers. Brodsky continues to be influential in her active role in the College Art Association, and as Board Chair of the New York Fine Arts Foundation. Brodsky was interviewed for !Women Art Revolution. In 2016, she received an honorary Doctor of Fine Arts at Rider University.

== Influence and reception ==
The power of feminist art : the American movement of the 1970s, history and impact, which was published in 1994 and which Brodsky co-wrote and edited with Norma Broude and Mary D. Garrard, was the first major art history text focusing solely on American art made by women. The book particularly focused on women's art during the 1970s, which coincided with the American Women's Movement, and impacted subsequent generations of feminist artists and art historians, for whom it remains a relevant resource. As testament to the book's impact, the three authors were interviewed in 2021 on the occasion of the 100th anniversary of the College Art Association.

Yet, as British feminist art historian Grizelda Pollock noted in her 1995 review at the time, the "triumph" of women's art in the book was not merely premature, as Pollock notes women artists 20 years after those celebrated in the book were still struggling for recognition; but also "smacks of the cold war triumphalism" prominent in the U.S. during the 1980-90s, and does not acknowledge the ways that feminist perspectives are themselves disputed within and by many of the works included.

In 2011 Brodsky became an Honorary Vice President of the National Association of Women Artists, the first women's professional fine art organization founded in the US.

== Art ==
A printmaker, Brodsky’s work is in the permanent collections of more than 100 museums and corporations such as The Library of Congress; the Victoria & Albert Museum, London; The Stadtsmuseum, Berlin; the Grunwald Center for the Graphic Arts, University of California at Los Angeles; the Rhode Island School of Design Museum; the New Jersey State Museum; and the Fogg Museum at Harvard. In 2023, her print Dishrag Diagrammatic (1977) was selected as print of the month for International Women’s Day by the Victoria & Albert Museum.

Of particular note is a one-person exhibition of her work, Memoir of an Assimilated Family, at the Philadelphia Museum of Jewish Art (March 3, 2010 - July 30, 2010). Consisting of approximately 150 etchings based on old family photographs, Brodsky's exhibited oeuvre negotiates cultural assimilation and how the Holocaust functions as lens through which to view family.

== Books and exhibition catalogues ==
- Brodsky, Judith K. (2022). Dismantling the Patriarchy, Bit by Bit: Art, Feminism, and Digital Technology. London. ISBN 1-350-24350-7. OCLC 1268516972.
- Brodsky, Judith K. (2018). Junctures in women's leadership: the arts. Ferris Olin. New Brunswick. ISBN 978-0-8135-7627-5. OCLC 1129596483.
- Artists as innovators : celebrating three decades of NYSCA/NYFA fellowships, Fall 2017-Spring 2020 (2017). Samuel Dorsky Museum of Art, New York State Council on the Arts, New York Foundation for the Arts. New Paltz, New York. 2017. ISBN 978-0-692-91563-9. OCLC 1078923868.
- Alkazzi, Basil (2013). Basil Alkazzi: an Odyssey of Dreams: a Decade of Paintings 2003-2012. Donald B. Kuspit, Michael L. Royce, Judith K. Brodsky, Harry I. Naar, Bradbury Gallery, Anne Kittrell Gallery. New York, NY. ISBN 978-1-85759-876-6. OCLC 857525045.
- Brodsky, Judith K. (2012). The fertile crescent : gender, art, and society. Ferris Olin, Mason Gross School of the Arts. Galleries. New Brunswick, N.J.: Rutgers University Institute for Women and Art. ISBN 978-0-9790497-9-8. OCLC 794365492.
- Declaration of independence: fifty years of art by Faith Ringgold (2009). Faith Ringgold, Judith K. Brodsky, Ferris Olin, Tanya Sheehan, Michele Wallace, Mason Gross School of the Arts. Galleries. New Brunswick, NJ: Institute for Women and Art, Rutgers, The State University of New Jersey. 2009. ISBN 978-0-9790497-7-4. OCLC 537766296.
- Judith K. Brodsky: memoir of an assimilated family. Judith K. Brodsky, Harry I. Naar, Rider University. Gallery. Lawrenceville, N.J.: Rider University Art Gallery. 2003. ISBN 0-9745606-0-X. OCLC 55525798.
- Beyond the fold: artist's [sic] books, traditional to cutting edge: a national book arts survey (1999). Judith K. Brodsky; Edward H. Hutchins. Catalog of an exhibition held Sept. 12-Oct. 31, 1999, in the Gallery of South Orange. OCLC 42947487.
- The power of feminist art: the American movement of the 1970s, history and impact (1994). Norma Broude, Mary D. Garrard, Judith K. Brodsky. New York. 1994. ISBN 0-8109-3732-8. OCLC 29794506.

== Curating ==
- From Dürer to Digital and 3-D: The Metamorphosis of the Printed Image (March 8 to April 28, 2019), The Trenton City Museum at Ellarslie Mansion in Philadelphia. The exhibition featured such artists from the Brodsky Center as Eric Avery, Willie Birch, Frank Bowling, Willie Cole, Maria Gutierrez, Barkley Hendricks, Margo Humphrey, and Kiki Smith.
- The Meadowlands Strike Back (February 23 - April 28, 1996). Rhode Island School of Design /aka/ RISD Art Museum.
