= National Association of Women Artists =

American professional organization

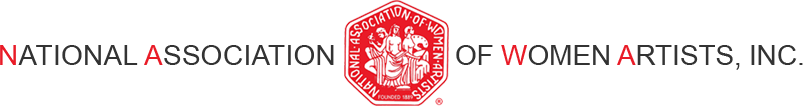
- Established: January 31, 1889; 137 years ago
- Founders: Anita C. Ashley, Adele Frances Bedell, Elizabeth S. Cheever, Edith Mitchel Prellwitz, Grace Fitz-Randolph
- Founded at: New York City
- Type: 501(c)(3) organization
- Headquarters: New York City
- Location(s): 15 Gramercy Park South Room 301 New York, NY 10003
- Website: www.thenawa.org
- Formerly called: Woman's Art Club of New York (1889–1913); National Association of Women Painters and Sculptors (1913–1942)

The National Association of Women Artists, Inc. (NAWA) is a United States organization, founded in 1889 to gain recognition for professional women fine artists in an era when that field was strongly male-oriented. It sponsors exhibitions, awards and prizes, and organizes lectures and special events.

NAWA’s 1988 Centennial Exhibition stimulated an ongoing debate in the media about female representation in the arts and gender parity in major exhibitions and historical art studies.

== Constitution ==
NAWA is a non-profit organization, based in Gramercy Park, NYC, with chapters in Florida, South Carolina, Massachusetts, and Pennsylvania. The Board and Officers of the Association are voted in annually by the membership, which numbers over 850 (at 2020).

== History ==
=== Early years: Woman's Art Club of New York (1889–1913) ===
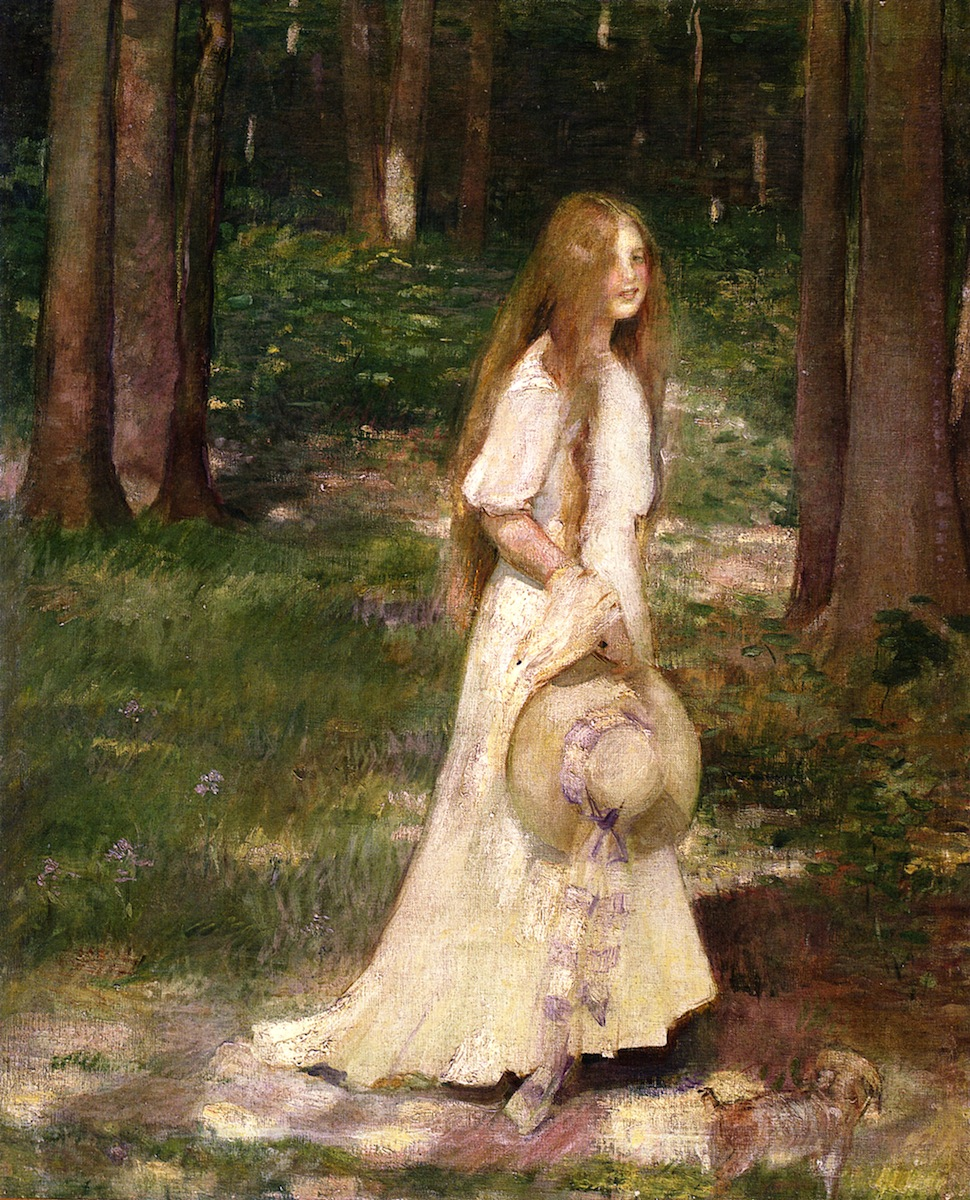
Edith Mitchill Prellwitz, Early Morning Stroll, c. 1900. Oil on canvas, 76.2 cm × 63.5 cm (30 × 25 in.) Private collection. Artist Edith Mitchill Prellwitz was one of the founders of the Woman's Art Club of New York.

NAWA was founded as the Woman's Art Club of New York by artists Anita C. Ashley, Adele Frances Bedell, Elizabeth S. Cheever, Edith Mitchill Prellwitz, and Grace Fitz-Randolph in Fritz-Randolph's studio on Washington Square in New York on January 31, 1889. As Liana Moonie (president of the NAWA, 1987–1989) remarks in the foreword to the centennial exhibition catalog, the Club was notable for having provided a platform for professional artists, whereas, at the time, female representation in the arts was frequently restricted to the decorative.

Assessing the necessity for and role of women's artists groups in the United States, artist and historian Julie Graham writes: "These associations arose out of the genuine need of women artists which were not being met by the largely male organizations of their day: they provided support, a place to show work, and they often provided instruction and models as well ... The most successful club of those founded in the 19th century is the National Association of Women Artists."

A New York Times reporter covering the Club's third annual exhibition in 1892 of over 300 works of fine art, drew a parallel to Parisian salons, suggesting: "it is well ... that women should combine here, as they have long combined in Paris, to show their own work by itself, unaffected by the opinion or prejudices of masculine juries of acceptance and masculine hanging committees." As now, early exhibitions were not restricted to members, nor to New York artists exclusively, and included works by Mary Cassatt, Berthe Morisot, Louise Catherine Breslau, Laura Coombs Hills, Rhoda Holmes Nicholls, and Cecilia Beaux.

Between 1892 and 1905, the Club's membership doubled from 46 to approximately 100, and by 1914 grew to 183 artists and 30 more associates.

=== The National Association of Women Painters and Sculptors (1913–1941) ===
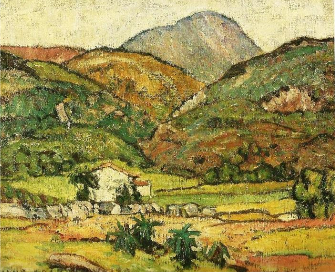
Anne Goldthwaite, The Church on the Hill, 1913 Armory Show

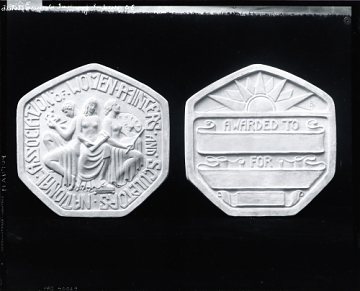
Model for the National Association of Women Painters and Sculptors Medal (obverse and reverse). Model by Brenda Putnam. Photograph by Peter A. Juley & Son via the Smithsonian Institution.

In 1913, Club members voted to change the name of the organization to The Association of Women Painters and Sculptors to avoid association with social clubs.

Also in 1913, the influential 1913 Armory Show featured works by members Josephine Paddock, Mary Wilson Preston, Anne Goldthwaite and Abastenia St. Leger Eberle, among others. The association's name was once again amended in 1917 to The National Association of Women Painters and Sculptors (NAWPS). By then, the association had 500 members in 40 states. In 1917, Clara Fairfield Perry, an observer for The American Magazine of Art, commented: "One notes with interest the rapid development that marks the growth of this association which is national in its scope, having a membership of over 500 artists located in all parts of the United States and which comprises the most representative artists among women in the professions of painting and sculpture in this country."

In 1924, the Association and the American Ambassadors to Argentina organized a traveling exhibition of paintings, sculpture and miniatures, which were shown at the Museo Nacional de Bellas Artes in Buenos Aires and the Galeria Jorge in Rio de Janeiro.

The same year, the NAWPS purchased a building at 17 East 62nd Street to exhibit works. The house was opened in fall of 1925, making it "the first gallery [in the United States] devoted entirely to the work of women artists." By 1930, the association's growing debt and the advent of the Great Depression forced the sale of the house. The deal, however, was profitable, allowing the association to re-invest the money in equipment and a lease at Argent Galleries at 42 West 57th Street, which remained open during the Great Depression. Karen Rosenberg, art critic for The New York Times, reflected on the Association's activity during this period: "The association endured and even thrived during the Depression ... Female artists also benefited during those years from the many anonymous contests for Works Progress Administration murals and other public artworks."

Throughout the mid-1920s and 1930s, NAWPS faced criticism for its perceived lack of innovation. In 1925, for example, art critic John Loughery noted that "the image of gentility ... had become attached to the older, more conservative National Association of Women Painters and Sculptors." Recognizing the ameliorated but ongoing disparity between male and female artists, the association broadened its scope, focusing on extending its support system beyond New York by organizing traveling exhibitions. Responding to the criticism in the association's centennial exhibition catalog (1988), guest curator Ronald G. Pisano wrote: "Over the last 100 year period it was often claimed, even by women, that the Association had accomplished its goals and there was no longer a need for the organization. In the wake of each new achievement, however, the continuing need for the services the Association provides, both to its membership and to American women artists in general, has been demonstrated and recognized."

=== The National Association of Women Artists (1941-present) ===
The current name, The National Association of Women Artists, was adopted in 1941.

In 1961, the NAWA moved its headquarters to 156 5th Avenue. After several location changes, the Association office currently resides at The National Arts Club at 15 Gramercy Park South, #301.

The association's centennial exhibition in 1988 featured works by both historic and contemporary artists, including modern artists Marisol Escobar, Judy Chicago, Louise Nevelson, Dorothy Dehner, Cleo Hartwig, Minna Citron, Blanche Lazzell, Alice Neel, et al.

An exhibition dedicated to select sculptors and members of the NAWA, "The Enduring Figure 1890s–1970s: Sixteen Sculptors from the National Association of Women Artists", was shown at the Zimmerli Art Museum in December 12, 1999 – March 12, 2000. The exhibition featured such artists as Mary Callery, Janet Scudder, Margaret Brassler Kane, Berta Margolies, Minna Harkavy, Bessie Potter Vonnoh, Augusta Savage, Louise Nevelson, Dorothy Dehner, Faith Ringgold, and others.

The NAWA is considered a pioneering organization for the advancement of women in the arts. It was "the first group of women artists to band together to fight discrimination and gain recognition for its members."

As Benjamin Genoccio wrote in a New York Times review of "A Parallel Presence: National Association of Women Artists, 1889–2009," while "by the 1980s and '90s the idea of an organization devoted to women was starting to seem passé, as women became a larger presence in art schools, commercial galleries and museums ... [t]he National Association of Women Artists played a role in this process, for which female artists—and the rest of us—should be grateful."

In 1995, a chapter of the National Association of Women Artists was founded in Florida by Liana Moonie (president of the NAWA, 1987–1989).

In December 2013, another chapter of the NAWA was established in Massachusetts, with headquarters in Boston.

==== Advancement of women in the arts in the postwar period (1945-today) ====
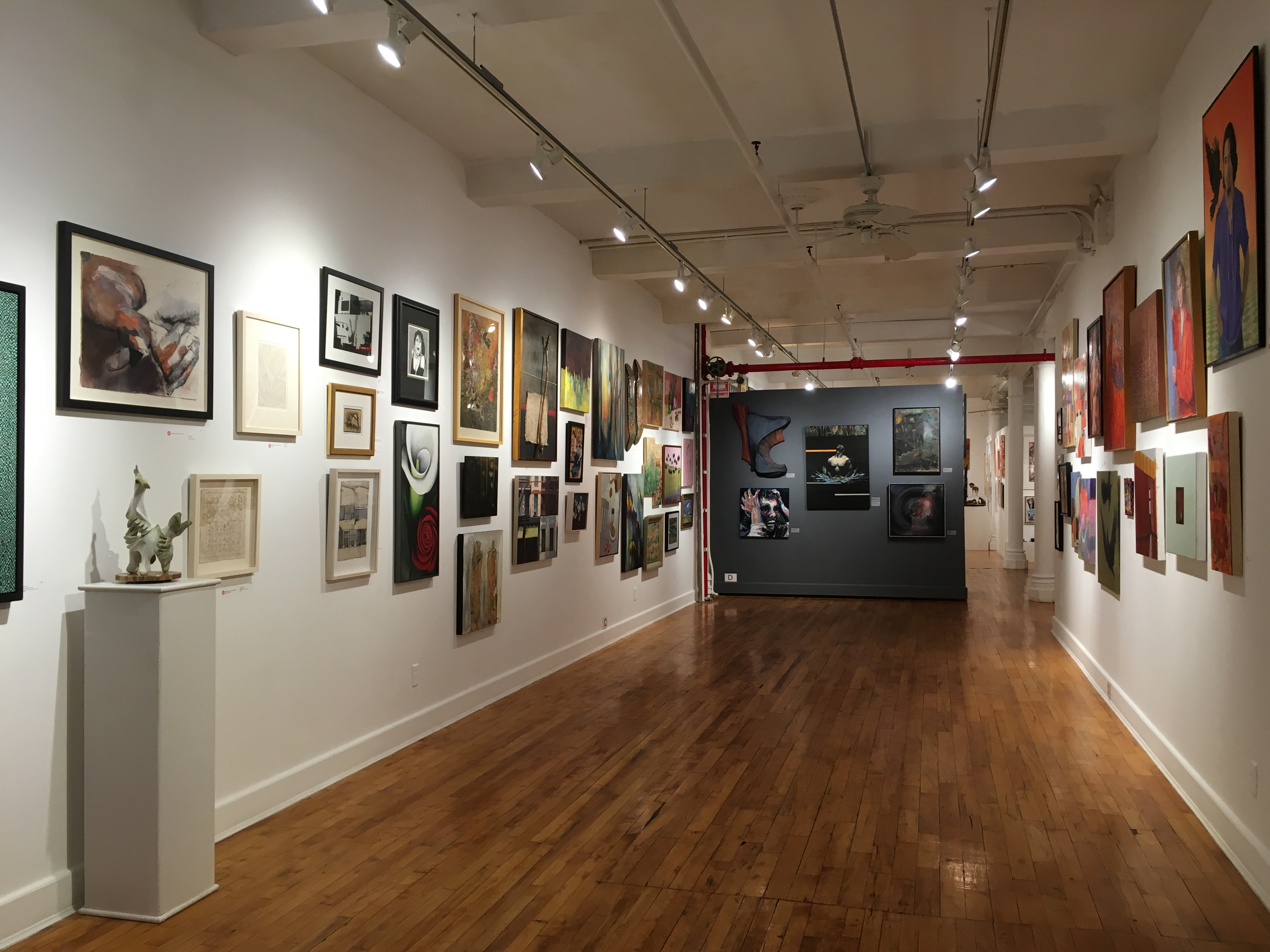
128th Annual Members' Exhibition (2017) at the Sylvia Wald and Po Kim Art Gallery, 417 Lafayette Street

In the United States, visibility of women artists in the postwar period improved somewhat, spurred by second-wave feminism. Institutions devoted to the advancement of women in the arts became more decentralized, in keeping with the rise of alternative spaces (typically run by artists and not associated with museums or galleries), especially during the 1970s.

Simultaneously, throughout the latter half of the twentieth century, the notion of achieved equality between men and women in the arts (based on representation in private and museum collections, at gallery shows) was continually challenged. Art historian Margaret Moore Booker contextualizes the formation of women art's organizations in the 1970s: "Solo shows by women in major museums and galleries were a rare occurrence, there were almost no works by women on display in the permanent collections of museums, major galleries in New York represented only a few token women, and most college art history textbooks ignored women."

Similar concerns about gender parity in the art world are raised today. Assessing women in art in the twenty-first century, art historian Whitney Chadwick writes: "There remains an ongoing need to document women's unique contributions in areas of patronage, collaborative practice, photography and new media in a concise and widely available format." Chadwick emphasizes the continuing need for "prestigious retrospective exhibitions at major museums or the full-length monographic studies that secure visibility and reputations in [the] art world" and support for contemporary women artists.

==== Mission statement ====
The NAWA mission statement is:

"To foster and promote awareness of, and interest in, visual art created by women in the United States.

The Association promotes culture and education in the visual arts through exhibitions of its members' works, educational programs, scholarships, awards, its historical archive and other appropriate means.

While encouraging contemporary and emerging artists, the Association honors and continues the long and important contribution of women to the history of American culture and art".

=== NAWA Permanent Collection ===
The NAWA Permanent Collection, established in 1991 by Liana Moonie (president of the NAWA, 1987–1989), comprises over 200 works dating from the founding of the Association. In 1992, the collection was donated to the Zimmerli Art Museum at Rutgers University in New Brunswick, New Jersey, where it has been housed since. The exhibition "A Parallel Presence: National Association of Women Artists, 1889–2009," which ran at the Zimmerli Art Museum from January 17 to April 26, 2009 and at UBS Art Gallery in Midtown, New York from May 14 to July 31, 2009, presented works by approximately 80 artists, including Grimanesa Amorós, Gertrude Vanderbilt Whitney, Theresa Bernstein, Louise Nevelson, Pat Adams, Faith Ringgold, as well as archival materials related to the history of the organization.

=== Archive ===
The NAWA archive is held at the Zimmerli Art Museum at Rutgers University.

A portion of the NAWA archives – "administrative and membership records from the 1960s, exhibition records, printed material, and three scrapbooks" – are held at the Smithsonian Institution. Additional records, including the annual catalog, can be found at the Solomon R. Guggenheim Museum, Metropolitan Museum of Art, Whitney Museum of American Art, Museum of Modern Art, Ryerson & Burnham Libraries, Frick Art Reference Library, New York Public Library, Film and Fine Art Library at Harvard University, and Library of Congress.

== Members ==
A complete list of current members is published on the NAWA website. Select historic members include:

- Nela Arias-Misson
- Loren Roberta Barton
- Gladys Edgerly Bates
- Theresa Bernstein
- Cora S. Brooks
- Louise Upton Brumback
- Edith Bry
- Ruth Payne Burgess
- Rhys Caparn
- Constance Cochrane
- Nessa Cohen
- Mabel Conkling
- Margaret Miller Cooper
- Dorothy Dehner
- Eve Drewelowe
- Emma Eilers
- Dorothy Eisner
- Lydia Field Emmet
- Kady Faulkner
- Anna S. Fisher
- Gertrude Fiske
- Ruth VanSickle Ford
- Wilda Gerideau-Squires
- Anne Goldthwaite
- Cleo Hartwig
- Claude Raguet Hirst
- Margaret Hoard
- Edith Lucile Howard
- Margaret Wendell Huntington
- Grace Mott Johnson
- Frances Kornbluth
- Mary Fife Laning
- Josephine Miles Lewis
- Emma Fordyce MacRae
- Kyra Markham
- Dina Melicov
- Clara Taggart MacChesney
- Louise Nevelson
- Elizabeth Nourse
- Mina Fonda Ochtman
- Betty Waldo Parish
- Clara Weaver Parrish
- Clara Elsene Peck
- Lucia Peka
- Jane Peterson
- Alexandra Pregel
- Faith Ringgold
- Augusta Savage
- Alice Schille
- Grete Margaret Schüller
- Janet Scudder
- Amanda Brewster Sewell
- Anita Miller Smith
- Beulah Stevenson
- Waldine Tauch
- Natalie Arras Tepper
- Vicken von Post-Börjesson
- Gertrude Vanderbilt Whitney
- Adeline Albright Wigand
- Louise Waterman Wise
- Alice Morgan Wright

== Honorary Vice Presidents - Then and Now ==
- Pat Adams
- Meredith Bergmann
- Judith K. Brodsky
- Judy Chicago
- Ann Chwatsky
- Audrey Flack
- Joyce Kozloff
- Gail Levin
- Joanne Mattera
- Dr. Ferris Olin
- Judy Pfaff
- Maura Reilly
- Faith Ringgold
- Dorothea Rockburne
- Cornelia Seckel
- Rhoda Sherbell
- Linda Stein
- Kay WalkingStick
