= Rhys Caparn =

American sculptor

- Rhys Caparn, in studio, 1948
- Born: July 28, 1909; Onteora, New York
- Died: April 29, 1997 (aged 87); Danbury, Connecticut
- Known for: Artist
- Spouse: Johannes Steel (m. 1935; died 1988)

Rhys Caparn (1909–1997) was an American sculptor known for her animal, landscape, and architectural subjects. Her works were mostly abstract but based on natural forms. In many of them she employed free lines and used a restrained style that nonetheless conveyed what critics saw as an emotional charge. In the animal sculptures for which she became best known, she achieved what a critic called "a graceful curvilinear balance." Another critic put this aspect of her style in terms of the arch of a cat's back in one of her pieces: "A cat's arched back is a pleasingly rounded shape and well balanced on the foundation of paws. But it is still a cat's back, embodying a cat's peculiar physical response to fear or affection." Her foundational influences included an ancient Greek statue and the abstract works of Constantin Brancusi. From her most prominent instructor, Alexander Archipenko, she said she learned to seek out the underlying ideal in a natural form, the point at which "form and idea become one." Her works were mostly small and almost all made by modeling.

She received her training in Paris and New York. With the support of her parents and two wealthy widows, she was able to devote her time to study and creative work and her sculptures made an immediate impact when first shown in the early 1930s. Throughout the rest of her long career, she exhibited frequently in commercial galleries, museums, and the shows of the nonprofit associations of which she was a member. She helped to form the Federation of Modern Painters and Sculptors in 1940 and thereafter served as one of its leaders. In the 1940s and 1950s, she taught sculpture classes two days a week at the Dalton School in Manhattan. She won a prestigious and controversial award from the Metropolitan Museum of Art in 1951. She died of Alzheimer's disease in 1997.

== Early life and education ==
Caparn was born in 1909 in a resort town north of New York City. Her father was a noted landscape architect and her mother a successful voice teacher. In 1926, during her senior year in a local private school, her mother brought her to France for a visit with her sister Anne who was studying in Paris. During a visit to the Louvre, Caparn encountered an ancient sculpture, a kore of a young female acolyte from the Heraion of Samos. The sculpture is a standing figure missing its head wearing traditional garments with almost no body parts exposed. The piece has been described as a subtle handling of the layered fabrics' lines and folds. Caparn later said it became a major influence in shaping her approach to art.

After graduating from high school, she spent two years as a student in Bryn Mawr College where an art history course in ancient Greek sculpture captured her attention. Her realization that a four-year liberal arts education was not for her coincided with a minor crisis in the life of her older sister, Anne. (Note: In 1926 Anne Caparn spent a year studying in Paris. In 1927 she was active in New York society. In 1928 she became engaged to Theodore Lee Gaillard, a journalist working on the society pages of the New York Times. The minor crisis in Anne's life was Anne's termination of this engagement at some point during 1929.) Despite the stock market crash of 1929, their mother found money enough for the two sisters to spend a year in Paris. Once there, Caparn began studies under an animal sculptor, Édouard Navellier, at the École Artistique des Animaux. (Note: Édouard Félicien Eugene Navellier (1865–1944) taught animal sculpture at the École Artistique des Animaux in Paris during the 1920s and 1930s. He exhibited widely and was well-known in Europe for his precise, realistic work.) She later recalled that the school maintained a menagerie including a wild boar. The boar, she said, was tame in comparison with a savage goose that was also present. Returning home at the end of 1930 she took a further two and a half years of instruction from the avant-garde sculptor Alexander Archipenko in his school in Manhattan. (Note: Alexander Archipenko (1887–1964) opened an art school in Manhattan soon after his arrival from Berlin in 1923. He had previously directed art schools in Paris (1913) and Berlin (1921). Called simply the Archipenko School, it gave instruction in sculpture, painting, and drawing.) She sculpted human torsos during this period but soon realized that she preferred animal forms. She began going to the Bronx Zoo and for the next two years made many drawings of animals.

Caparn later credited two women with the guidance and financial aid she needed to complete her studies and embark on a career as a professional sculptor. The first was Elizabeth Alexander, widow of the painter John White Alexander. Elizabeth Alexander helped make Caparn's time in Paris "the most wonderful year in the world" by giving her and her sister a place to live, by finding studio space for her to work in, by arranging for her to study with Navellier, and, later, by encouraging her to attend classes with Archipenko. (Note: Left wealthy at her husband's death in 1915, Elizabeth Alexander (whose maiden and married surnames were both Alexander) engaged a long and productive career as philanthropist in New York and cultural leader. A founder of the Arden Galleries, she was particularly noted for her ability to identify and assist young artists by providing direct financial support and by arranging benefit concerts and exhibitions to raise funds for their benefit.) The second woman was Lee Wood Haggin (1856–1934). Like Alexander, Lee Wood Haggin was a wealthy widow whose philanthropy contributed to New York culture in general and to artists in particular. Both women were connected to the MacDowell Club. Haggin was its founder and leading financial supporter and Alexander was active in its affairs. They were both residents of Onteora, the private community where Caparn was born. Caparn later said of Haggin, "Mrs. Haggin helped me a great deal, simply because of the kind of person she was." (Note: Caparn's father, Harold ap Rhys Caparn, designed a cloister garden for Haggin's property at Onteora.)

== Career in art ==
Caparn's first exhibition took place in 1932 a few days before her twenty-third birthday. It was held in conjunction with a concert by baritone Willard Fry held at the Southampton studio of his uncle the artist, Marshal Fry. She showed human and animal figures in marble, clay, and terracotta and the New York Times covered the event in its Society pages. The following year she was given an exhibition with two other artists at a commercial New York gallery called Delphic Studios. (Note: Journalist and art patron Alma Reed founded Delphic Studios in 1929. Mainly known for its emphasis on Mexican art, the gallery also showed photographers, such as Edward Weston and Ansel Adams as well as contemporary American artists, such as Thomas Hart Benton, and sculptors such as Gwen Lux. In 1931 Reed had mounted an exhibition of Edward Weston's photographs at the Brooklyn Botanical Garden. The images were said to illustrate the use of plants as source material for design.) Reviewing the show in the New York Sun, critic Henry McBride said she used "the freest lines for forms" to make emotionally charged works to which "the old-fashioned ideas of sculpture do not apply." Archipenko contributed an introduction to the Delphic Studios catalog for the exhibition. In it he wrote, "The idealism of Rhys Caparn and her love for the spiritual permit her to create a new form of sculpture, without her losing the ability to sculpt in a naturalistic form when she so desires." Also in 1933, she made the animal forms that encircled an armillary sphere made by her father as part of his landscape design at the Brooklyn Botanical Garden.

In 1935 Delphic Studios gave Caparn a solo exhibition in which she showed realist portrait heads as well as animal abstractions. In this period her sculpture was not universally admired. When she participated in a group show sponsored by Salons of America in 1936, Anita Brenner of the Brooklyn Daily Eagle called attention to her "monstrous sculpture inspired by rubber tubes." (Note: In 1922 Hamilton Easter Field founded Salons of America to give artists an alternative to the Society of Independent Artists whose financial and publicity methods he found objectionable. A reporter said he aimed "to give equal opportunity to every member, whether he or she be a conservative or a post-Dadaist.") Late in the decade she received an invitation to join an outspoken group of extreme abstractionists called American Abstract Artists. She joined and remained a member but later said she was not particularly committed to the organization. She said it was not as collegial as the Federation of Modern Painters and Sculptors which she helped found in 1940.

In 1939, Caparn contributed drawings to the annual black-and-white exhibition at Grant Studios. (Note: Marion Louise MacDonald Grant (1895-1984) was a Canadian-born American citizen. She was the wife of financier Seaward Grant and a leader in Brooklyn society. In 1931 she established a commercial gallery called Grant Studios in Brooklyn Heights. The gallery showed contemporary American painters and sculptors, including many women. It was said to specialize in helping ignite the careers of struggling artists. In addition to selling art, Grant made space available for social events and fund-raising events.) This was the first time she showed her works on paper. She showed them frequently in later years, often in conjunction with her sculpture. In a 1967 interview she said, "I've drawn all my life. You draw for a vocabulary; it feeds your eye" and when, in 1983, an interviewer commented on her freedom of line, she said she drew spontaneously and very quickly.

Later in 1939, Caparn participated in a group exhibition at the Passedoit Gallery. (Note: The Passedoit Gallery was founded by Georgette Passedoit. Born in Paris in 1875, she came to New York in 1892 and established a career as an actress. A goddaughter of the French commander, Joseph Joffre, she returned to France during World War I to care for wounded soldiers. After returning to New York and making a name for herself on the Broadway stage, she opened the Passedoit Gallery in 1932.) In reviewing the show Howard Devree said, "Rhys Caparn's 'Bird' has about it more than a little of antique Chinese abstraction of treatment and her 'Stalking Cat' compasses sinister stealth." In 1942 Caparn exhibited sculptures of animals from countries then at war at an exhibition held at the Bronx Zoo, made posters supporting the war effort, and participated in a fund-raising event called "Women Can Take It." (Note: "Women Can Take It" was the name of a benefit performance put on by New York artists and celebrities to raise funds for the Citizens Committee for the Army and Navy. That group put on stage shows at military installations. Caparn participated (under her married name) in a part of the show called "cavalcade of women of history." "Women Can Take It" was also the name of a radio program that the Citizens Committee sponsored.)

In 1944 Caparn was elected president of the Federation of Modern Painters and Sculptors (the organization she had helped to found four years earlier). In that role she wrote the Museum of Modern Art to take issue with what she called its "increasingly reactionary policies" toward the work of American artists. In February of that year the Wildenstein Gallery gave a one-person show of her animal sculptures and drawings. Reviewing the show, a critic for the New York Times said, "The true spirit of all these animals has been caught." At the same time Naomi Jolles of the New York Post interviewed Caparn regarding her life and work. In the interview she said she saw her work was an extension of her life and added her regret that people tended to see art as something separate from the daily lives they led.

Caparn began part-time work as an art instructor in 1946. Over the next 25 years, she taught classes two days a week at the Dalton School, a private school in Manhattan. She later said she was surprised how much she enjoyed the work and surprised as well that she was good at it. In 1947 she served on a jury of the National Association of Women Artists to select works for an exhibition at the National Academy of Design. When the president of the association removed a sculpture called "The Lovers," Caparn resigned. She resumed her membership after the piece was re-installed following an apology from the president for what she said was a misunderstanding. Later that year she showed animal subjects in a solo exhibition at Wildenstein Galleries, including a group called "White Stallions" and a single piece called "Doe" that Devree said were among the best things she had done.

The year after that she accompanied her husband on a trip to countries behind what was then being called the Iron Curtain and after her return began, for the first time, to sculpt landscape forms. A few years later she was one of eleven sculptors to represent the United States in a competition held in London on the subject, "The Unknown Political Prisoner." The piece she presented, an abstract standing figure, did not win the award, but was nonetheless pictured in a New York Times article on the event. In 1956 she was given the first of several solo and group exhibitions at the Meltzer Gallery. (Note: Doris Meltzer (1908–1977) opened the gallery that bore her name in 1955. A former director of the National Serigraph Society, she had previously operated the Serigraph Gallery at the same location. The Meltzer Gallery showed painters, printmakers, and sculptors, including many women artists.) Calling her work "semi-abstract," a critic said, "her feeling is exclusively sculptural and has nothing to do with illustration or literary values." A retrospective solo exhibition at Meltzer three years later drew from Stuart Preston of the New York Times a summation of her approach. He said the sculpture was formal but also expressive and abstract but with "acute individual characterization." He said she discarded the "trivia of realism in order to concentrate on her subject's ultimate shapes." When in 1958 she showed with two other sculptors at the American Museum of Natural History Preston wrote that "Rhys Caparn's carvings catch [her subjects] at fugitive moments, birds flying, gazelles leaping or horses rearing. Quick observation and a feeling for grace of movement are at work here." Similarly, when she showed landforms at a solo show of recent bronzes at Meltzer in 1960, Preston noted that the pieces stood "proxy for observed landscape." Later that year her sculpture was included in a group show entitled "Aspect de al Sculpture Americaine" at the Galerie Claude Bernard, Paris. The following year she was given a retrospective solo exhibition at the Riverside Museum. (Note: Established in 1938 and closed in 1971, the Riverside Museum held exhibitions of modern art, particularly contemporary works by women artists and artists from Asia and Latin America.)

During the 1950s and 1960s, Caparn continued to participate in group exhibitions held by the Federation of Modern Painters and Sculptors and the National Association of Women Artists. She moved home and studio to Connecticut in the middle of the 1960s and thereafter favored local commercial galleries for exhibitions. A gallery in Bethel, Connecticut, gave her a 47-year retrospective in 1977. Reviewing the show a critic for a local paper described architectural pieces that had not previously been noted, pointing to her use of "the sparsest elements—a single while wall and lintel of its portal, a couple of arches, a village square, a fragmented empty chapel." Regarding a retrospective show in 1981 a critic for the New York Times wrote of landscape plaster reliefs that began to appear following her postwar trip to Eastern Europe and mentioned house shapes that had become a more recent preoccupation. This critic also mentioned a "gentle but firm touch" evident in her work and suggested, "it may be that she lacks that touch of megalomania so necessary for the effective statement in three dimensions."

=== Prizes ===
Caparn received awards from the National Association of Women Painters and Sculptors (later National Association of Women Artists), including its Medal of Honor for Sculpture. In a national competition called "American Sculpture, 1951" at the Metropolitan Museum of Art, Caparn's "Animal Form I" was awarded $2,500 as second prize. The National Sculpture Society complained that the jurors unjustly favored a modernist style over the classically realist style that it advocated. A letter from the society called the award-winning pieces "work not only of extreme modernistic and negative tendencies but mediocre left-wing work at that." The museum stood by its decisions and issued a statement defending the neutrality of its award policies. (Note: The letter from the National Sculpture Society had been circulated widely across the United States asking recipients to endorse the protest. When submitted, it contained the signatures of 273 artists along with professionals in other fields. Its tone was distinctly political, purporting to speak "in the name of the sound, normal American people," it accused the museum of participating in a left-wing conspiracy and maintained that "American democracy" was being "attacked from every angle by a philosophy of totalitarianism" of which "modernistic art proved an effective vanguard." The College Art Association, American Federation of Arts, American Institute of Architects, and other national organizations defended the Metropolitan Museum and criticized the sculpture society for conflating modern art and radical politics.)

=== Artistic style ===
Rhys Caparn, Stalking Cat, 1939, bronze, 26 x 16 inches

Rhys Caparn, Standing Bird, undated, bronze, 19 3/4 inches

Rhys Caparn, The Bear, 1960, bronze, approximately 60 inches

Rhys Caparn, Greyhounds, about 1938, bronze, 11 x 18 inches

Rhys Caparn, Foliage, 1967, ink and wash on paper, 19 x 24 inches

Caparn's earliest influences came from her encounter with the sculptures of ancient Greece. As an art student she learned a realist technique from her Parisian art instructor, Édouard Navellier, and her early animal and figure pieces were correspondingly realist in style. On returning to New York she attended an exhibition of works by Brancusi that, as she later said, completely changed her approach to art. She began to develop a style that, in 1935, Howard Devree, called a "graceful, curvilinear balance." This style was not symmetrical and ornamental, but rather expressive, with the ability to create an emotional response in the viewer. Writing in the Brooklyn Daily Eagle in 1936, Anita Brenner told readers that "charm and decorative value" could not yield first-rate works of art; to accomplish that feat required the power of emotion. "As between an academician and a Goya, equally skilled," she said, "what makes the difference is the power of emotion in the Goya." When, in response to an interviewer's question that year, Caparn called her work "expression with form," she was agreeing with this principle. In 1933, Henry McBride, writing in the New York Sun had compared the emotional effect she achieved with the response listeners feel in a musical performance. She agreed with this point as well, saying, in 1936, that she believed sculpture and music to offer analogous emotional experiences. "Modernism in sculpture," she said, "is like music in form." She was passionate about form but was not seen as a formalist, her style was spare and reserved while remaining expressive. One critic put this aspect of her style in terms of the arch of a cat's back: "A cat's arched back is a pleasingly rounded shape and well balanced on the foundation of paws. But it is still a cat's back, embodying a cat's peculiar physical response to fear or affection." Caparn's sculptures, "Stalking Cat" (at right) and "Standing Bird" (at left) show her ability to create the expressive forms that critics saw in her work.

Caparn did not carve hard materials to make her sculptures. Rather than cutting away, she built up, modeling in soft materials such as clay, plasticine, plaster, variants of plaster (hydrocal and densite), and a material called "tattistone". (Note: Like plaster, hydrocal and densite are derived from gypsum rock. They are both stronger than plaster, having greater density and being more crystalline. Densite is the stronger of the two. Tattistone was an aggregate of marble dust, color, stone chips, and hardening agents that was made by the conservator, Alexander Tatti, for sculptor Louise Nevelson in the 1940s.) She made free-standing single subjects and subjects in groups as well as reliefs. Her works on paper were in black and white and pastel. Almost all her pieces were small. Once, she said, she made a six-and-a-half-foot statue, adding, "It was fun, but too big. I couldn't move it out of the studio." Caparn's sculpture, "The Bear," (shown at right) is larger than most of her work, but otherwise quite typical of her style. "Greyhounds" (shown at left) is an example of her work in relief. The drawing of foliage (shown at right) is an example of her work on paper. Its subject is reminiscent of her father's landscape photos and plans.

== Personal life and family ==
Caparn was born on July 18, 1909, in a private resort called Onteora in New York's Catskill Mountains. (Note: Onteora still exists with its original name and it remains a private seasonal community organized as a club. It was founded in 1887 by Candace Wheeler with her sister-in-law, Jeannette Thurber, and their husbands. Wheeler was an interior designer, author, and founder of the New York Society of Decorative Arts. Thurber was a patron of classical music and founder of the National Conservatory of Music of America. Consisting of rustic cottages and an equally rustic inn, called the Bear and Fox, the club required new members to be nominated and elected by current ones. In its early years, its members were mainly people in arts and letters, particularly single women within New York literary circles. One visitor described Onteora as a "cottage colony for city dwellers in comfortable circumstances with a desire to retreat to the woods to meditate on art, nature and society." Calvert Vaux, a landscape architect and associate of Caparn's father in the plans for the Brooklyn Botanic Gardens, was a director of Onteora. Jeannette Thurber, head of a music academy in Manhattan and likely acquaintance of Caparn's mother, was one of Onteora's founders.) Caparn's father was Harold ap Rhys Caparn (1863–1945). A British immigrant, he was a successful landscape architect and author, known for his work in the Brooklyn Botanic Garden, the Bronx Zoo, the campus of Brooklyn College, and other public and private gardens. Her mother was Clara Howard Jones (Royall) Caparn (1866–1970), a vocalist and successful voice teacher. Clara Caparn began teaching soon after moving to Manhattan in the early 1900s and, using the professional name "Mrs. C. Howard Royall," succeeded in attracting students among the matrons of New York's social elite and their daughters. She also attracted talented, but less wealthy students and for their benefit frequently held performances to raise scholarship funds. In 1939 she created "An Hour of Music," an organization that supported and encouraged young musicians by giving them opportunities to perform in public. She taught until age 85 and died in 1970 at the age of 103. Caparn's parents were married in Manhattan in 1906 after her mother had dissolved a marriage of 1889 to George Claiborne Royall (1860–1943), a merchant of Goldsboro, North Carolina.

Caparn had an older sister, Anne Howard Caparn (1907–1971), with whom she was close. She had two step-brothers from her mother's first marriage, Kenneth Claiborne Royall (1894–1971) and George Claiborne Royall, Jr. (1896–1967). Both were raised by their father in Goldsboro, both attended the University of North Carolina, and both served as officers in the U.S. Army. The elder was a lawyer and general in the U.S. Army. Appointed Secretary of the Army in 1947, he oversaw the racial integration of the Army and Air Force. Having returned to private practice he was, in 1963, appointed co-leader of a commission to investigate white-supremicist violence in Birmingham, Alabama. The younger saw service in France during World War I and retired as a Major. He was an investment banker in the 1920s and subsequently held positions in the federal government in Washington, D.C.

As a child, Caparn enjoyed outdoor life on her family's rustic estate called Fernie Farm in Briarcliff Manor, New York. She later said her childhood ambition was to collect animals, adding that neighbors learned to call her parents when their pets disappeared. A biographer of Caparn's said that in watching her father implement the landscape designs for the property, Caparn "became aware of her father's enthusiasm for designed space--the positive shape of a tree, the negative shape of the sky, the precise angle of a slope." Although the family stayed at Fernie Farm only on weekends and during vacations, Caparn's parents were contributing members of the community. Giving the Briarcliff address as her residence, her mother was founder and president of the Art Alliance of Westchester County. Her father was a member of the Briarcliff municipal board and designer of the village park.

Caparn attended the Brearley School between 1918 and 1927. In 1925 and 1926 she took dance classes from Adeline King Robinson in preparation for her 1927 début in New York society. (Note: Like many prospective debutantes, Caparn took classes from Robinson to learn how dance and perform her other duties gracefully during the events of the debutante season. Robinson also organized dances, known as Robinson alumnae dances, at places like the St. Regis, Ritz-Carlton and Plaza hotels for young women who had completed her classes.) Complying with social practices of the time, Caparn's mother hosted a series of luncheons in her honor at the Cosmopolitan Club.

After graduating from Brearley, Caparn received a prize for academic excellence as a first-year Bryn Mawr student. When, in 1929, the engagement of Caparn's sister Anne was broken off, and when, at the same time, Caparn decided that she did not wish to pursue her education at Bryn Mawr, their mother provided funds for the two women to spend a year in Paris. It was then, as noted above, that she studied under Edouard Navellier.

In the early 1930s, after she had established herself as a professional sculptor, Caparn met her future husband, Johannes Steel. He had come to her studio to examine the sculpted head she had made of a mutual friend. Although her mother would have liked to give the couple a society wedding, their marriage date was put forward after Steel received an unexpected foreign assignment and the couple departed for London very soon after the ceremony. German-born, Steel came to the United States in 1934 and was naturalized in 1938. An outspoken critic of the Nazi regime, he earned his living as an author, journalist, lecturer, and radio commentator. After World War II, he was investigated and condemned for his Soviet sympathies. Late in life, he wrote news columns on the stock market. In the 1960s he served a year in prison for violating securities laws. (Note: Steel's birth name was Herbert Johannes Stahl. He was born and raised in Germany, became a minor official in a German economic ministry, and escaped the country after an arrest for publishing an article critical of the Nazi party. Thereafter, he used Johannes Steel as a pseudonym when writing anti-Nazi publications first in Great Britain, then in the United States. When he became a naturalized citizen some four years after his arrival in New York, he changed his surname to Steel. His legal name was then Herbert Johannes Steel and he used Johannes Steel as his professional name. (The German word "stahl" means "steel" in English.) Throughout the 1930s he continued to write articles attacking the Nazi regime. In them, he frequently made predictions and became well known for the few that proved to be accurate. During these years and throughout the war years, Steel was a popular radio commentator, giving support to the New Deal policies of the Roosevelt government, its preparations for war, and the American contributions to the defeat of the Axis powers. He also voiced support for Soviet Communism and the Soviet military actions in Europe. During the early years of the Cold War, his warm regard for a regime that had now come to be seen as America's main enemy caused him to be investigated by the House Un-American Activities Committee. At this time he also lost his job as radio commentator and transformed himself into a syndicated newspaper columnist on the New York stock markets. During the 1960s he served a year in federal prison after being convicted for selling unregistered stock in a company he controlled.) Through all the ups and downs of Steel's career, Caparn remained deeply attached to him, and he to her. Steel died in 1988 at 80 years old. His obituary in the New York Times called him "a newspaperman and radio commentator whose career was marked by controversy over his outspoken left-wing views and his often sensational political and economic predictions." In the mid-1960s, when Steel began writing for the News-Times of Danbury, Connecticut, he and Caparn moved first to the nearby community of Newtown and later lived in Danbury. While living in Newtown and Danbury she would write occasional art comments for the same paper.

She died in Danbury on April 29, 1997, of Alzheimer's disease.
