= Konrad Cramer =

German-born American painter

- Born: 1888; Würzburg, Germany
- Died: 1963 (aged 74–75); New York, America
- Education: Academy of Fine Arts, Karlsruhe
- Occupation: Painter
- Spouse: Florence Ballin Cramer

Konrad Cramer (1888—1963) was a German-born American painter. He was trained at the Academy of Fine Arts in Karlsruhe, and he emigrated to the United States in 1911. A naturalized U.S. citizen, he is "often credited as being an important link between German and American modernism in art."
