= Loren Roberta Barton =

American painter and printmaker

- Born: 1893; Oxford, Massachusetts
- Died: 1975 (aged 81–82); Claremont, California

Loren Roberta Barton (1893–1975) was an American painter, illustrator, and printmaker known for her works in watercolor. She was the grand niece of Clara Barton, the founder of the Red Cross. She studied at the University of Southern California and the Art Students League of Los Angeles.

From 1929 though 1937, she lived in Rome with her husband Perez Babcock before returning to Los Angeles where she taught art at Chouinard School of Art in Los Angeles. She later married Russell Miller and lived at Pomona, California.

Barton was a member of The National Association of Women Painters and Sculptors.

Her work is included in the collections of the Smithsonian American Art Museum, the Art Institute of Chicago, the Brooklyn Museum and the Los Angeles County Museum of Art.
