= Maria R. Dixon =

American painter

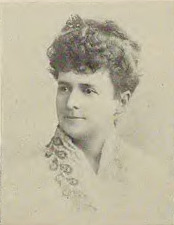
- Picture of Maria R. Dixon, from Essays on American art and artists, Eastern Art League, 1896.
- Education: Art Students League under Charles Yardley Turner

Maria R. Dixon (d. 1896) was an American painter active in the late 19th century. Dixon mostly painted genre paintings and portraits, and also did many drawings for illustrated journals.

== Life and career ==
Dixon did much of her work in New York, exhibiting with the Women's Art Club of New York. Dixon also worked under Charles Yardley Turner, who also did Genre paintings along with historical scenes.

Dixon often signed her paintings as M. R. Dixon, leaving out her first name to avoid sexism in the arts. This was common for women to do at the time. Dixon also primarily painted women in her genre paintings and portraits and often used her daughter as a model.

Essays on American Art and Artists mentions her several times, showing photos of her paintings along with her illustrations. Dixon was praised for her paintings of female figures and her skills in portraiture. Most of her Genre paintings depict women doing everyday activities like playing with cats or eating grapes, although she was also admired for her more dramatic and moving paintings, such as Into Each Life some Rain Must Fall.

Dixon died in 1896.

Dixon has work in the Huntsville Museum of Art, National Museum of Women in the Arts and Wilson College, where Dixon did a portrait of Sarah Wilson, who the college is named after.

== Selected works ==
- Idle Hours, n.d.
- Disturbing the Peace, n.d.
- An Interesting Moment, n.d.
- Into Each Life Some Rain Must Fall, n.d. 17 x 21 in.
- A Quiet Moment, 1896; Oil on canvas, 18 x 14 in. National Museum of Women in the Arts.
- The Student, n.d. oil on canvas, 24 x 18 in. Huntsville Museum of Art.
- Portrait of Sarah Wilson. n.d. Oil on canvas. Wilson College.
- Portrait of Girl Eating Grapes, n.d. Oil on canvas. 35 x 25 in.

== Gallery ==
Maria R. Dixon. Idle Hours. n.d. Photo of painting.

Maria. R Dixon. Disturbing the Peace. n.d. Photo of a Painting.

Maria R. Dixon, An Interesting Moment, n.d. Photo of a Painting.

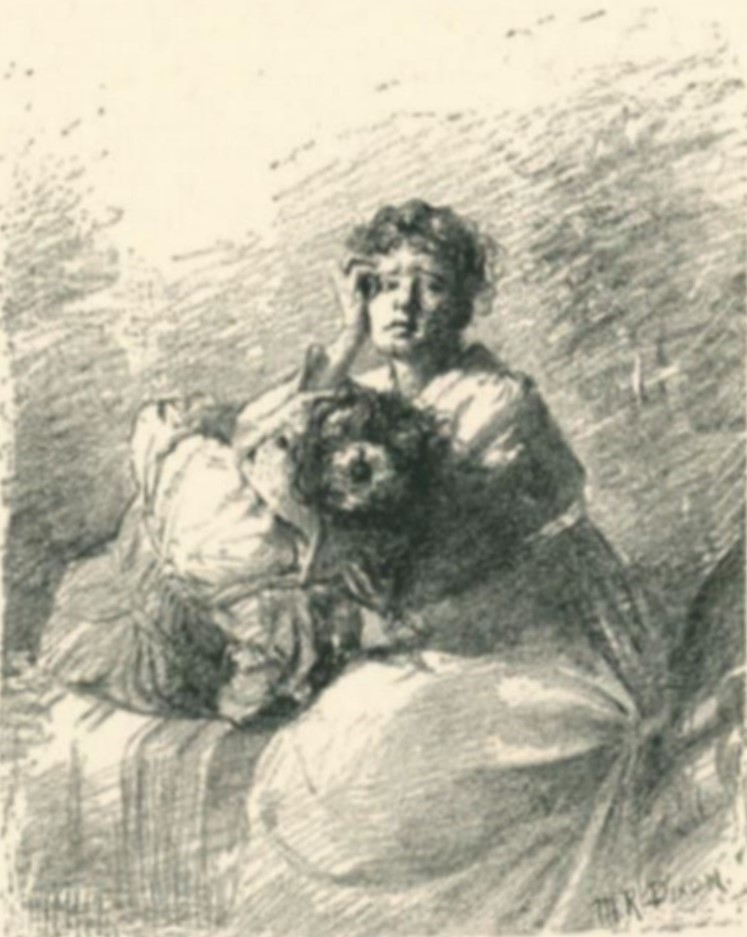
Maria R. Dixon, Into Each Life some Rain Must Fall. n.d. Photo of a drawing.
