= Ferris Olin =

Feminist scholar, curator and educator

- Born: June 27, 1948 (age 77); Trenton, New Jersey
- Movement: Feminist Art, Librarian, Art Historian
- Awards: Women's Caucus for Art Lifetime Achievement Award 2012

Ferris Olin (June 27, 1948, Trenton, New Jersey), the American feminist, scholar, art historian, curator, educator and librarian, founded and directed The Margery Somers Foster Center, part of the Rutgers University Libraries at the Mabel Smith Douglass Library (MSLD). She is best known for co-founding the Institute for Women and Art, Miriam Schapiro Archives on Women Artists, the Feminist Art Project and the Women Artists Archive National Directory with Judith K. Brodsky. She attended Rutgers University as an undergraduate and graduate student, where she served as a member of the faculty from 1976-2012; and has since been a Distinguished Professor Emerita. In these positions, she conceived and implemented initiatives that placed Rutgers at the center for research and scholarship on women’s leadership in the visual arts. From the beginning of her career, Olin was involved with the Women’s Movement. Between 1975 and 1976, Olin was the librarian for the Training Institute for the Sex Desegregation of the Public Schools, later known as Consortium for Education and Equity. Located at Douglass College, on the Rutgers New Brunswick campus, the Institute was a federally funded sex-equity assistance center serving public school educators and administrators in New Jersey, New York, the Virgin Islands and Puerto Rico.

== Rutgers, The State University of New Jersey (1976-2012) ==
After earning her undergraduate degree at Douglass College, a women's college, witnessing the beginnings of the Feminist Art movement on campus, and participating in expanding the scope of women’s and gender studies research and activities on campus, Olin wrote her dissertation "Consuming Passions: Women Art Collectors and Cultural Politics in the United States, 1945-1995," at Rutgers, The State University of New Jersey. Supervised by Joan Marter, Olin addresses the contributions “of women art collectors in United States at the end of the 20th century,” specifically how mature women in the post war era, like Samella Sanders Lewis (1923-2022) of Los Angeles, CA and Louise Rosenfield Noun (1908-2002) of Des Moines, IA, were inspired by the social changes of their own era in developing the scope of their collecting of artworks and social justice activism.

From the start of her career, Ferris Olin focused on women's issues in her service as a graduate student and member of the faculty and leader of women focused programs at Rutgers University from 1976-2012 that placed Rutgers at the center of research and scholarship on women’s leadership in the visual arts.

Olin participated in developing government sponsored programs focused on equity for women, including as the librarian (1975–76) for the Training Institute for the Sex Desegregation of the Public Schools, later known as Consortium for Education and Equity. Located at Douglass College, on the Rutgers, New Brunswick campus, the institute was a federally funded sex-equity assistance center serving public school educators and administrators in New Jersey, New York, the Virgin Islands and Puerto Rico. The Institute "developed training programs to assist schools in implementing gender equity in accordance with Title IX and New Jersey statutes."

A decade later, Olin's efforts to centralize the study of women on the Rutgers campus led to her appointment as the executive officer (1985-1994) for The Institute for Research on Women (IRW) and the Blanch, Edith and Irving Laurie New Jersey Chair in Women’s Studies, which encourages research on women and gender within and across the disciplines through weekly interdisciplinary seminars, lecture series, and the Global Scholars program. In this role, Olin was an administrator for another government funded project called the New Jersey Project: Integrating the Scholarship on Gender, the first statewide, state-funded faculty development and curriculum transformation project in the United States. For this work, Olin received the 1987 Rhoda Freeman Recognition Award from the New Jersey College and University Coalition on Women’s Education. She also worked to increase the presence of women's scholarly and artistic work on campus by establishing the IRW’s Visiting Scholars Program, acquiring the records of the Women’s Caucus for Art; and negotiating the donation of artworks by members of the National Association of Women Artists to Douglass College and the Zimmerli Art Museum, on Rutgers College Avenue campus.

As Associate Professor, Olin founded The Margery Somers Foster Center: A Resource Center and Digital Archive on Women, Scholarship and Leadership, at the Mabel Smith Douglass Library (MSDL). The Foster Center created a technology-rich learning environment and "community center" for student/faculty collaboration with new media and primary resources on gender and women across all disciplines. To further position Rutgers as the center for research and scholarship on women’s leadership in the visual arts, Olin established the Miriam Schapiro Archives on Women Artists as "part of the Foster Center portfolio," which initially housed acquired collections focused on women artists and visual arts organizations. This collection is now part of the wider Rutgers University Libraries collection.

In 1994, Olin was named curator of the Mary H. Dana Women Artists Series (DWAS), “the oldest continuous running exhibition space in the United States dedicated to making visible the work of emerging and established contemporary women artists.” Founded in 1971, by Douglass College graduate, artist, MacArthur Fellow Joan Snyder, and established in the Mabel Smith Douglass Library, DWAS is today a program of Center for Women in the Arts and Humanities “in partnership with Rutgers University Libraries.” DWAS showcases works by international women artists, performers, and is a nationally recognized and award-winning exhibition series, that has hosted more than 500 solo and group shows. As curator of DWAS, Olin oversaw the establishment of the Estelle Lebowitz Visiting Artist-in-Residence Lectureship program, a residency that furthered the work of bringing internationally recognized artists to Rutgers' Douglass campus.

== Professional advocacy for women in the arts ==
On the national stage, in addition to her work with the College Art Association, Women’s Caucus for Art, and Art Libraries Society of North America, Olin served on the advisory council of the exhibition, Making Their Mark: Women; Move into the Mainstream (1970-1985); advocated and was consultant for women collectors in her work with Women Patrons and Collectors: Past and Present International Conference (1998-1999); including consulting on Cynthia Lawrence’s book Women and Art in Early Modern Europe: Patrons, Collectors and Connoisseurs (1997, Penn State). She has served as an honorary vice-president for the National Association of Women Artists since 1995, and is now on the advisory boards of the Brodsky Center at Pennsylvania Academy of the Fine Arts, and the woman-centric galleries SOHO20 and A.I.R. Gallery.

In 2023, the Arts Council of Princeton established the Ferris Olin Cultural Collaborative in honor of the inclusive nature of Olin’s life’s work. The Collaborative is underwritten to support an annual summit designed to bring together Princeton and Trenton-area arts and educational organizations, youth service agencies, organizations to connect and share information; and hosts three visiting artist each year, starting in 2024.

== Collaborations with Judith K. Brodsky (1986-present) ==
In 1986, Olin and Judith K. Brodsky first collaborated on a course for Rutgers’ Mason Gross School of the Arts Visual Arts Department. They co-conceived and co-taught “Models of Persistence,” a class focused on 20th century American art, including new scholarship on gender. From the beginning, their partnership has focused on interdependent, intersectional, and interdisciplinary feminist initiatives, including education, publishing, organizing, curating and advocating for feminist art.

Brodsky and Olin’s initial efforts took place within the Rutgers’ community, across all three campuses. Their aim was to incorporate the visual arts, especially women’s contributions to it, into an expanded curriculum, and thereby integrate visual literacy into the student experience. Importantly, through their collective efforts, the aesthetic and intellectual contributions of women visual arts professionals were recognized and documented. They work closely together, co-authoring books, including Junctures in Women’s Leadership: The Arts.

In 2005, Olin and Brodsky received funds for their proposed center for women in art from then Rutgers’ University President Richard McCormack, who announced the opening of the Institute for Women and Art (IWA) and the appointment of Brodsky and Olin as co-directors in 2006. The IWA was established to transform values, policies, and institutions, and to ensure that the intellectual and aesthetic contributions of women visual artists from diverse communities were included in the cultural mainstream and acknowledged in the historical record.

Together, since 2005, Brodsky and Olin also developed and have managed The Feminist Art Project (TFAP) and its Advisory Council—an international collaborative that recognizes the aesthetic and intellectual impact of women artists on the cultural record, to counter the erasure of women artist, and celebrate the feminist art movement. For TFAP’s inaugural event, Brodsky and Olin co-curated the exhibition How American Women Invented Postmodernism, 1970-1975 at the Mason Gross School of the Arts galleries and bringing pioneering feminist artists together for the first time in more than a quarter of a century. They also co-authored the accompanying catalog. Olin and Brodsky built TFAP to align with national and international art institutions, but specifically professional as an Affiliate Association with the College Art Association (CAA), the largest professional visual arts association in the US. Annually TFAP provides a very popular day of conference programming on the cutting edge of feminist art. Today, TFAP has more 45 regional coordinators, and has mounted more than 1200 exhibitions and programs about women artists, on the schedule through 2023. In 2023, TFAP left Rutgers to become allied with the Women’s Caucus for Art.

Olin and Brodsky co-curated the Mary H. Dana Women Artists Series from 2006 to 2016. Olin again curated and exhibit for the Series in the 2018/2019 term. During this period, Brodsky and Olin organized more than 75 exhibitions of works by over 225 artists, along with related programming, including lectures and programs co-sponsored by departments and research centers on the Rutgers’ campus. Their partnerships expanded DWAS’ reach and provided space to addressed issues raised by women-identifying artists in their works. During their tenure they co-authored and published more than 50 exhibition catalogs, in print and online.

In 2023, Olin's curatorial effort to celebrate the Brodsky Center came to fruition. Olin opened The Brodsky Center at Rutgers University: Three Decades, 1986–2017 at the Zimmerli Art Museum. Olin also edited the accompanying catalog of the same name.

== Publications ==
- Brodsky, Judith K.; Olin, Ferris (2006). How American Women Artists Invented Postmodernism, 1970-1975. New Brunswick, NJ: Margery Somers Foster Center, Mabel Smith Douglass Library. OCLC 85257667.
- Brodsky, Judith K.; Olin, Ferris (2012). The Fertile Crescent: Gender, Art, and Society. Mason Gross School of the Arts (Rutgers University). Galleries. New Brunswick, N.J.: Rutgers University Institute for Women and Art. ISBN 978-0-9790497-9-8. OCLC 794365492.
- Ferris Olin (2023). The Brodsky Center at Rutgers University: Three Decades, 1986–2017, Rutgers University Press ISBN 978-1978839922

== Awards and honors ==
Olin was awarded a Women's Caucus for Art Lifetime Achievement Award in 2012. In 1980, Olin received a grant from the National Endowment for the Humanities to found, at Radcliffe College, the Women in the Community Project.
