= Woman's Art Club of New York =

The Woman's Art Club of New York was founded in New York City in 1889 and provided a means for social interaction and marketing of women's works of art. The club accepted members from the United States and abroad. In 1913, the group changed its name to the National Association of Women Painters and Sculptors. The current name for the group is the National Association of Women Artists, which was adopted in 1941.

== History ==
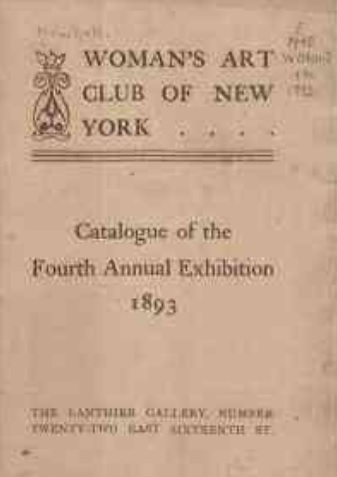
Woman's Art Club of New York Exhibition Catalogue of 1893

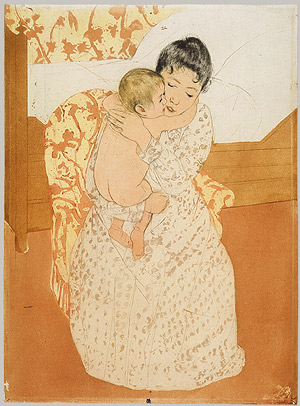
Mary Cassatt, Maternal Caress, 1891, dry point etching. Mary Cassatt presented "a set of those colored dry-point etchings of a pronounced Japanese kind in which she indulges and which look so much like colored lithographs..." of women and children to the 1892 exhibition.

The club was founded by the artists Anita C. Ashley, Adele Frances Bedell, Elizabeth S. Cheever, Edith Mitchill Prellwitz, and Grace Fitz-Randolph in Fritz-Randolph's studio on Washington Square in New York on January 31, 1889. The purpose was for "social intercourse among art lovers, for exhibition and to further art interests." More specifically, it aimed to provide a way in which women's works of art could be marketed that were otherwise limited to women at the time.

The group held annual art exhibitions in which members could submit one art work for the exhibition. Any additional works were reviewed by the selection jury. Its members included non-exhibiting and exhibiting members. The Woman's Art Club accepted members and exhibition contributions from women in the United States and abroad. For instance, Mary Cassatt, who lived in Paris, exhibited her works.

In 1892 there were about 300 works of art submitted, including watercolors, oils paintings, etchings, pastels and crayons.

Executive Committee members were elected at its November annual meeting. It was located at 9-Tenth Street.

In 1913, its name was changed to the National Association of Women Painters and Sculptors. It adopted the name National Association of Women Artists in 1941.

== Members ==
Some of its members were:

- Ruth Payne Burgess
- Emma Lampert Cooper
- Louise Cox
- Florence Ballin Cramer
- Jenny Eakin Delony
- Maria R. Dixon
- Claude Raguet Hirst
- M. Jean McLane
- Rhoda Holmes Nicholls
- Clara Weaver Parrish
- Amanda Brewster Sewell
- Isabelle Sprague Smith
- Clara Welles Lathrop
- Mary Rogers Williams
- Shirley Williamson, she also served as president
- Carol M. Albright

== See also ==
- Women artists

Other turn of the century New York art organizations that exhibited women's work

- MacDowell Club, New York, founded 1905
- New York Watercolor Club, founded 1890
