= Claude Raguet Hirst =

American painter

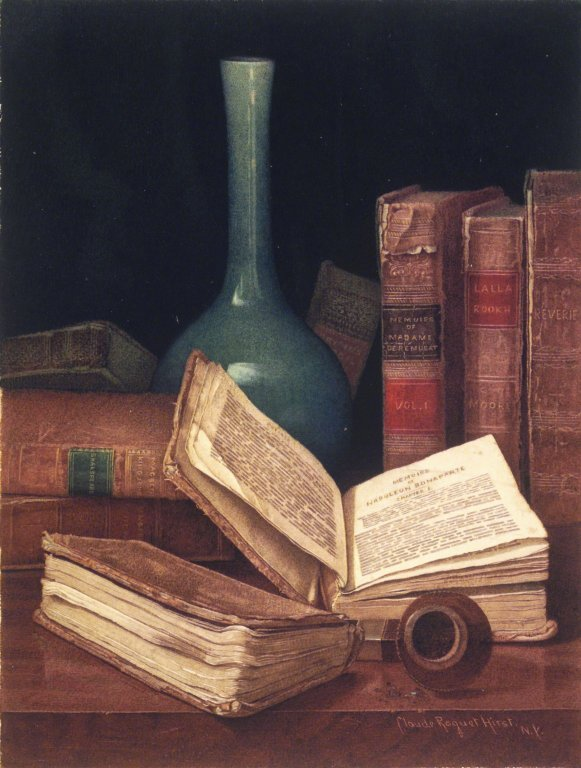
- The Bookworm's Table, c. 1890
- Born: November 2, 1855; Cincinnati, Ohio
- Died: May 2, 1942 (aged 86–87); New York City, U.S.
- Known for: Painting, wood carving
- Notable work: A Gentleman's Table
- Movement: Watercolor, trompe-l'œil
- Spouse: William C. Fitler (m. 1901)

Claude Raguet Hirst (born Claudine, 1855–1942) was an American painter of still lifes. She was the only woman of her era to gain acclaim using the trompe-l'œil ("fool the eye") technique.

== Early life and education ==
Claudine Hirst was born in Cincinnati, Ohio in November 1855, the eldest of two daughters of Juliet and Percy Hirst. She counted Pennsylvania Congressman Henry Wynkoop among her ancestors. When she was seven, the family moved to Clifton, a wealthy suburb with a burgeoning artist community. In a 1940 interview with the Villager, Hirst recalled starting painting lessons at the age of ten and attending dance school alongside a young William Howard Taft. By the time she was 14, she was enrolled at the Mount Auburn Young Ladies Institute. The 1872 Cincinnati Industrial Exposition included three of her early works.

In 1874, Hirst enrolled in the McMicken School of Drawing and Design where she took classes in three-dimensional drawing and wood carving. Her works were exhibited in the Women's Pavilion of the 1876 Centennial Exposition in Philadelphia. She left the School of Design in 1878 and taught wood carving. She was one of the artists who carved the elaborate Cincinnati Organ Screen for the Music Hall's organ. Beginning in the 1870s, she truncated her name to "Claude", possibly to avoid the sexism that stymied many women artists of the era.

== Move to New York ==
Hirst moved to New York City by 1880, where the promise of training, employment, and fame lured many of her contemporaries. Her mother and sister followed her there shortly after, leaving the alcoholic Percy Hirst in Ohio, where he soon died. Hirst rented a studio in Greenwich Village where she befriended landscape painter William Crothers Fitler. The pair married in 1901.

Whilst in New York, Hirst taught art and took private lessons from Agnes Dean Abbatt, Charles Courtney Curran, and George Henry Smillie. She joined both the Woman's Art Club of New York and the American Watercolor Society. She exhibited still lifes and watercolor paintings in New York and other cities. Her works were frequently exhibited alongside those of her instructors at venues such as the National Association of Women Painters and Sculptors, the National Academy of Design, the Boston Art Club, the Art Club of Philadelphia, and the Art Institute of Chicago. The subjects of her early still lifes in New York included fruit and flowers, most often pansies and roses, and she often identified the rose varietals in her titles. During the 1880s, Hirst's brushwork tightened, and would eventually become nearly indiscernible.

Hirst began using the hyper-realistic trompe-l'œil technique and masculine iconography. Her bachelor still lifes incorporated elements such as books, candles, newspapers, and meerschaum pipes arranged on a wooden table. She created a number of pipe and tobacco still lifes, one of which was purchased by sugar baron H.O. Havemeyer.

== Style ==
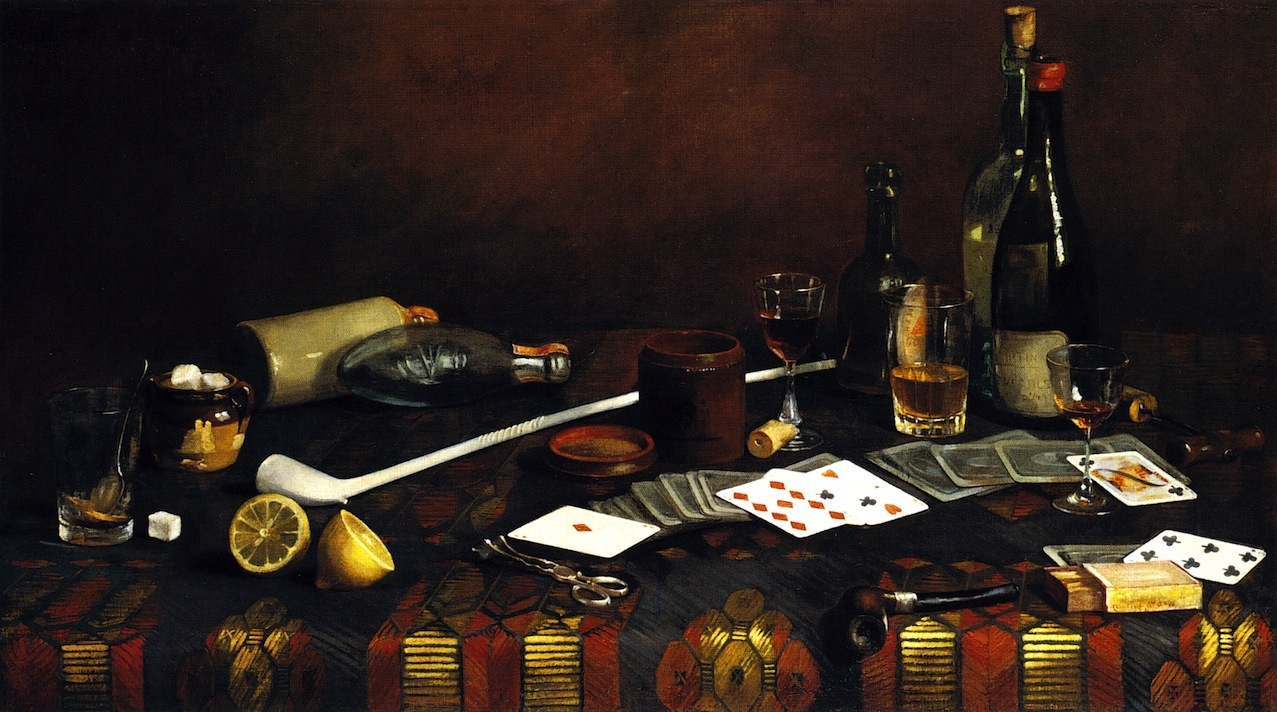
Hirst's painting, A Gentleman's Table (c. 1897–1902)

Hirst was one of the few women to employ trompe-l'œil during the Victorian Era. She was described as "the female Harnett" in reference to her contemporary, William Harnett. She abandoned flowers as a subject after 1890 and spent the rest of her career focusing on library table compositions. While the change in theme has been attributed to Harnett, Hirst herself related that "[Fitler] was not very orderly. His tobacco things were always around and one day I noticed what an attractive group they made. He had a meerschaum pipe that was a glorious color. It was like old ivory. I always liked old books and old engravings, so I put the pipe with some of my old books and painted them."

According to Christine Crafts Neal, Hirst's 1890s work, A Gentleman's Table "recalls the 17th-century Dutch tradition of the moralizing (vanitas) still-life composition." The piece has the features of a typical bachelor still life, with pipes, bottles, glasses and cards arranged on a table. According to art historian Martha Evans, works in the oeuvre of contemporaries Peto and Harnett typically condoned the male culture that was represented and rarely offered depictions of alcohol. Evans relates that while Hirst's work was commissioned by a men's club in Chicago, she offers a subtle criticism of the male pursuits of gambling and drinking. Most of the bottles are empty, implying that heavy drinking has taken place. The sugar cubes and sliced lemon suggest that one of the liquors is absinthe, "considered the 'cocaine' of the nineteenth century." The overturned bottles, the cards strewn about the table and the abandonment of a pyramidal composition create a sense of disarray in the work.
