= Kady Faulkner =

American artist (1901–1977)

- circa 1977
- Born: Katherine Burnap Faulkner; June 23, 1901; Syracuse, New York
- Died: May 7, 1977 (aged 75); Kenosha, Wisconsin
- Occupations: artist, art instructor
- Years active: 1930-1972

Kady Faulkner (1901–1977) was an American muralist, painter and art instructor who gained recognition in the middle of the 20th century. Her works are in the permanent collections of the Smithsonian American Art Museum, the Pennsylvania Academy of the Fine Arts, and the Great Plains Art Museum, as well as others. She was selected to work on the United States post office murals project of the U.S. Treasury during the New Deal and completed a mural for the Valentine, Nebraska post office. A mosaic by Faulkner in Kenosha, Wisconsin adorns the former bakery on the Kemper Hall grounds. She was an associate professor of art at the University of Nebraska–Lincoln between 1930 and 1950 and then instructed headed the Art Department at Kemper Hall until her retirement.

== Early life ==
Katherine Burnap Faulkner was born on June 23, 1901, in Syracuse, New York, to Margaret and Philip Faulkner. The family were related to the founders of the Simmons Mattress Company. She was the eldest of two daughters and contracted polio at a young age. After her recovery from the disease, she earned a BA from Syracuse University in 1925. Faulkner went on to continue studies at The Art Students League of New York for two years and then in 1928 studied at the Grand Central School of Art. That same year, she began studying at the University of Nebraska–Lincoln (UNL).

== Career ==
In 1930, Faulkner began instructing drawing and painting at UNL. She continued her own training, studying with Hans Hofmann in New York City in 1933 and with Boardman Robinson from the Colorado Springs Fine Arts Center and fresco muralist Henry Varnum Poor, working each summer until she completed her master's degree from Syracuse University. Throughout the 1930s and 1940s Faulkner exhibited at numerous galleries, gaining membership in the National Association of Women Painters and Sculptors in 1936 based upon four works submitted to the association for review. Her painting Prairie Farm was included in the organization's annual show that year. She participated in exhibitions in Dallas, Denver, Kansas City, New York City, Philadelphia and Syracuse and several shows with the Lincoln Artists Guild, including her works American Vacation, Dustbowl, Georgetown and Lost in the Forest. Dustbowl was featured in Art News Magazine in January 1938 andGeorgetown won honorable mention in a Lincoln show in 1939. After competing for the New Deal post office competition of the Treasury Department's Section of Painting and Sculpture for Dallas, Faulkner was awarded the commission for Valentine, Nebraska. In 1939, she finished End of the Trail, her mural for the Valentine, Nebraska post office. The painting is a tempera panel, representing goods arriving via train and being offloaded into wagons for settlers' use.

Faulkner completed murals for two churches in Nebraska and at the building housing the student union at UNL, before resigning from UNL in 1950. That same year, she accepted a position as head of the Art Department at a private Episcopalian boarding school, Kemper Hall in Kenosha, Wisconsin. Faulkner completed a mural for the chapel altar in Racine, Wisconsin for the DeKoven Foundation and in 1962, Faulkner designed a mosaic for the wall of the former bakery building on the Kemper campus. The building had been used by the Episcopalian Sisters of St. Mary, who had founded the school, to produce communion wafers. The proceeds of the wafers paid the expenses for the order and were sold internationally. The mosaic is 12 feet tall and 30 feet in length, depicting in three sections, the wine, the bread and the ingredients of the Eucharist. Though the school closed in 1975, it was preserved as a cultural center, with many of the buildings being restored. The bakery building was renamed in honor of Faulkner. In 2013, the Kenosha Historic Preservation Commission recommended that the mosaic be listed in the National Registry. Faulkner retired from Kemper in 1972, but continued to teach oil and watercolor classes after her retirement through the late 1970s.

Faulkner died 7 May 1977 in Kenosha, Wisconsin.

== Legacy ==
In 1972, a scholarship was established in her name by the Greater Kenosha Arts Council. She has works in the permanent collections of the Smithsonian American Art Museum, the Pennsylvania Academy of the Fine Arts, the Museum of Nebraska Art and the Great Plains Art Museum, as well as others.
