= Anna S. Fisher =

American artist and teacher (1873–1942)

- Anna S. Fisher by Henry Rittenberg
- Born: 1873; Cold Brook, New York
- Died: 1942 (aged 68–69); Cold Brook, New York
- Known for: Painting, Educator

Anna S. Fisher (1873–1942) was an American artist and teacher. She was proficient in both watercolors and oil paints. The National Academy of Design included her works in 40 annual exhibitions between 1904 and 1942.

== Biography ==
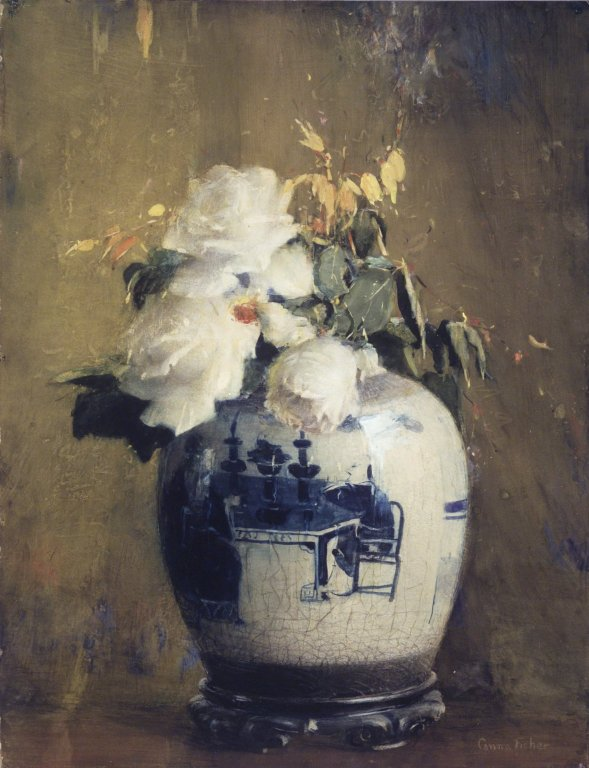
The White Roses - Brooklyn Museum

Fisher was born in Cold Brook, New York. She studied at Pratt Institute Art School in Brooklyn, New York, graduating in 1900. She then taught at Pratt for forty years.

Fisher was a member of the American Watercolor Society; the National Academy Museum and School; the American Watercolor Society; the New York Society of Painters; Allied Artists of America; the National Arts Club and the National Association of Women Artists.

Fisher died in Cold Brook in 1942. The same year Pratt Institute held a memorial exhibition of her work.

Her work is in the collections of Pratt Institute Art School, the Brooklyn Museum, National Academy Museum and School, and the National Arts Club.
