= Agnes Dean Abbatt =

American painter (1847–1917)

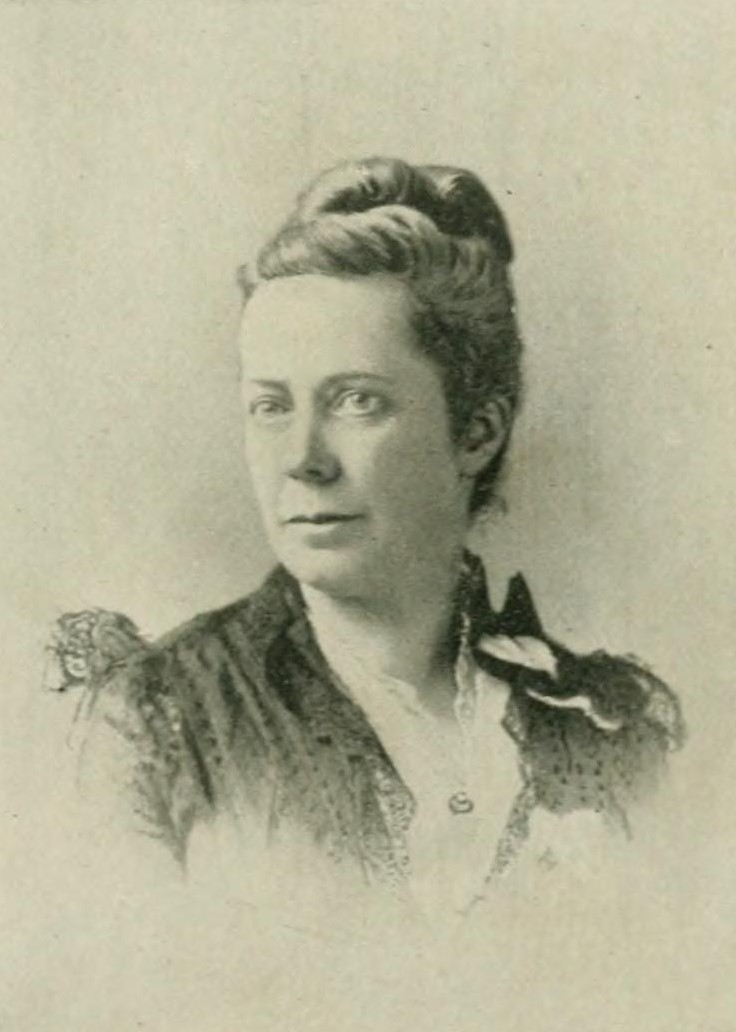
- "A woman of the century"
- Born: June 23, 1847
- Died: January 1, 1917 (aged 69); New York City, New York, United States
- Education: Artist and teacher

Agnes Dean Abbatt (June 23, 1847 – January 1, 1917) of New York was a painter of floral still lifes, landscapes, and coastal scenes. She was the second woman elected to the American Watercolor Society.

== Early life ==
Agnes Dean Abbatt was born on June 23, 1847, in New York City to William D. and Agnes Alice (Dean) Abbatt. Her family left England during the late 18th century and settled in Pleasant Valley, New York where her father was born. Agnes' mother was a French Huguenot. Agnes's grandmother was an amateur artist and encouraged all of her grandchildren in the study of art, but Agnes was the only grandchild to pursue art as a career.

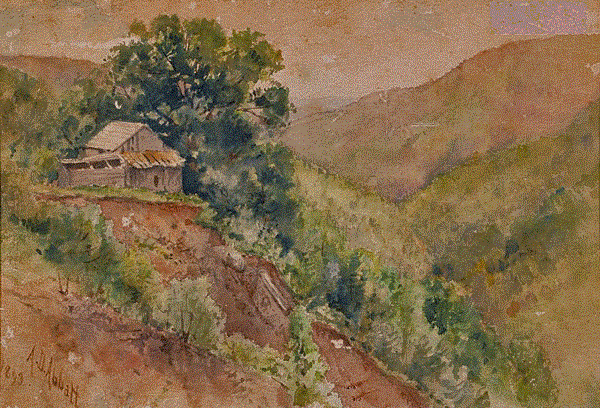
Hillside Landscape 1893

Agnes Abbatt entered Cooper Union in 1873 and won a medal in her first year for her drawing of the head of Ajax. This led to her acceptance to the National Academy of Design in New York. At the end of her first year, her first full-length drawing was selected for an exhibition.

== Career ==
Abbatt decided that she didn't want to be a figure painter and left the academy after a year to study landscape painting. She studied under the landscape artists James David Smillie and Robert Swain Gifford. In 1875, two of her first paintings, watercolor panels of flowers, were exhibited at the Brooklyn Art Club where they were purchased. She continued painting flowers, and progressed to landscapes, and coastal views of New York, Maine, and Massachusetts. In 1880, she exhibited another work, When Autumn Turns the Leaves, at the American Watercolor Society exhibition in New York. That same year, she was elected to join the Society; the second woman after Catherine Tharp Altvater.

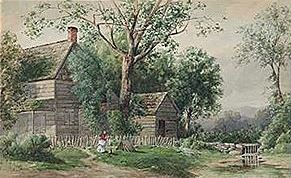
American Hillside Landscape

In addition to her career in art, Abbatt taught in Washington DC, Troy, NJ, and New Haven, CN. Amongst her private pupils was the Cincinnati-born Claude Raguet Hirst who went on to be a still life painter and the only woman of her era to adopt the trompe-l'œil ("fool the eye") technique. Abbatt continued to teach in New York and Maine, and continued to paint until her death on January 1, 1917.
