= Henry Gould Lewis =

American politician

- Born: September 9, 1820; Cornwall, Connecticut, U.S.
- Died: December 25, 1891 (aged 71); New Haven, Connecticut, U.S.
- Occupations: Politician, businessman
- Children: 3, including Josephine Miles Lewis

Henry Gould Lewis (September 9, 1820 – December 25, 1891) was an American politician. He was mayor of New Haven for four terms and served in the Connecticut House of Representatives.

== Early life and education ==
Lewis was born in Cornwall, Litchfield County, Connecticut, on September 9, 1820, the youngest child of William and Sarah A. (Calhoun) Lewis, who removed their residence to New Haven in 1832. Lewis graduated from Yale Law School in 1844.

== Career ==
Lewis remained in New Haven after his admission to the bar, and from 1847 to 1850 served as clerk of the courts. In 1853 he abandoned the practice of law for mercantile life, being elected at that date secretary and treasurer of the New Haven Wheel Company. In 1866 he became president of the company and remained in that position for many years. In 1866 he was elected a member of the New Haven Common Council, and in 1868 was sent as a Representative to the Connecticut State Legislature. He was elected mayor of New Haven in 1870 and was twice re-elected, serving until 1876. He was again re-elected in 1882.

== Personal life and legacy ==
Lewis was married, on October 5, 1858, to Julia W. Coley of New York City. Of their three children, two daughters survived them, the younger of whom, Josephine Miles Lewis, graduated at the Yale School of the Fine Arts in 1891. He died in New Haven, after a few days' illness from pneumonia, on December 25, 1891, in his 72nd year. His wife died six days later. A memorial bust was installed at Lewis Lookout in East Rock Park in 1895.
