= Johannes Steele =

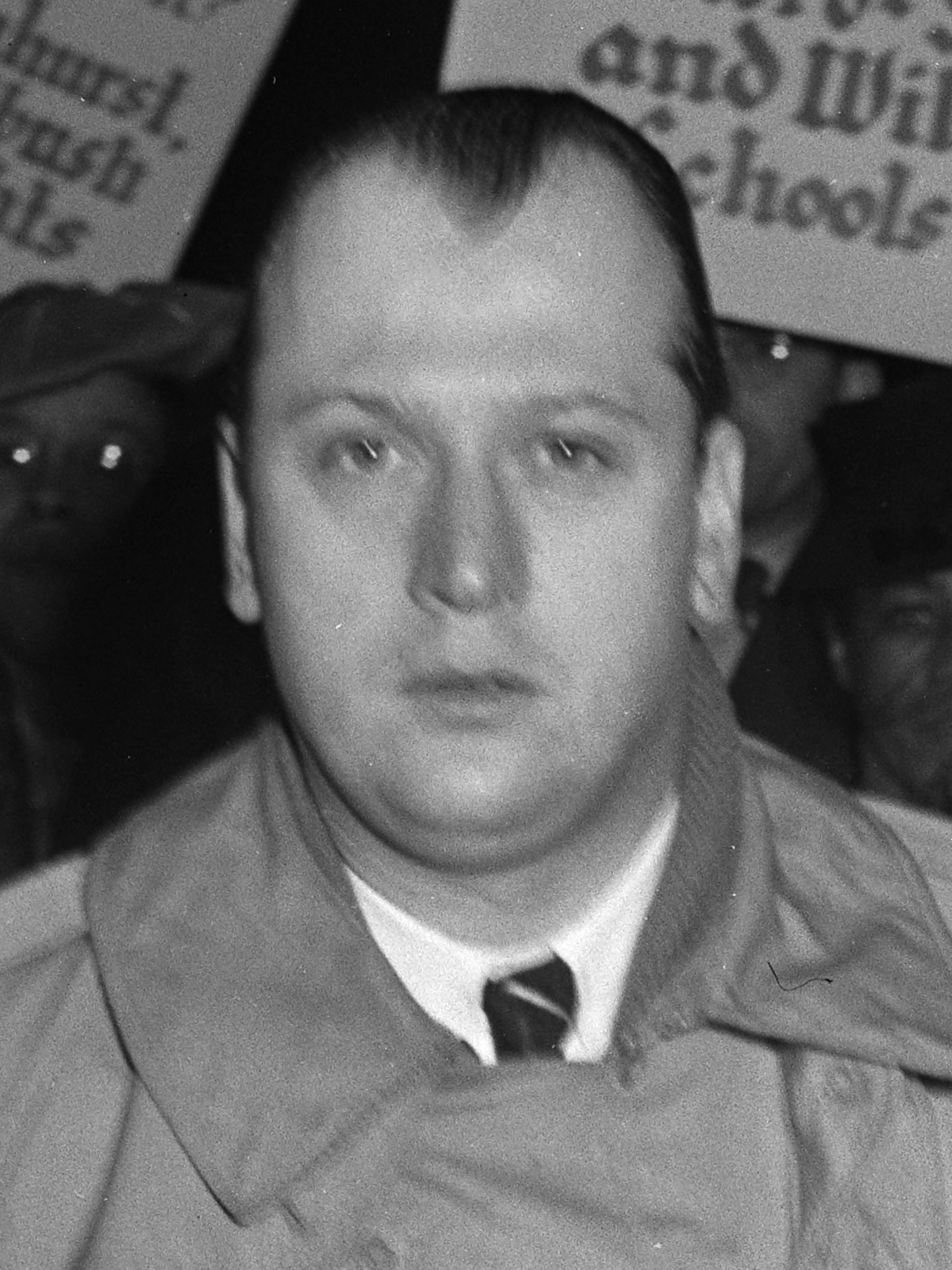
Steel in 1946

Johannes Steel (born Herbert Stahl; 1908–1988) was a German-born American author, best known for his 1934 book The Second World War. His wife was sculptor Rhys Caparn.

== Biography ==
The son of a German-Dutch landowner, Steel grew up in Elberfeld on the border of the two countries. He studied in Heidelberg, Oxford, Geneva, and Berlin, and then worked as a journalist. He fled to France and then Britain when the Nazis took power and later emigrated to the United States. He continued to work as a journalist, writing for The Nation and the New York Post, for which he was foreign news editor.

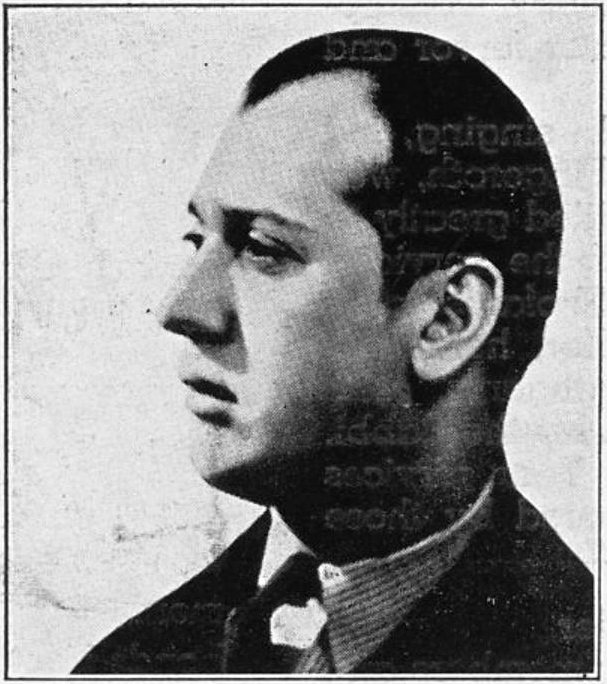
Steel c. 1939

Steel's book The Second World War predicted the war based on an assessment of Nazi intentions and historical parallels. Though the book had the war starting in 1935 rather than 1939 as it actually did, it became highly regarded after the start of the war, proving him essentially correct. Because of his prescience, he became widely followed, with a popular radio commentary in the U.S. during the war.

Steel ran for Congress in a 1946 special election in New York's 19th district, triggered by the resignation of incumbent Democrat Samuel Dickstein. Running on the American Labor Party ticket, Steel came in second place with 38% of the vote.

== Espionage ==
Steel was alleged to have had a covert relationship with Soviet intelligence during World War II; a deciphered Venona cable of Soviet intelligence traffic from July 1944 reveals Steel told Vladimir Pravdin of the New York KGB that Roman Moszulski, the director of the Polish Telegraphic Agency, was secretly pro-Communist and told Moszulski that he should remain in place with the Polish Telegraphic Agency, which was aligned with the London-based Polish government-in-exile, and set up a meeting with the KGB. At the meeting Moszulski told Pravdin he believed Poland should have good relations with the Soviet Union and, "having thought over the full seriousness and the possible consequences of his step, he was putting himself at our disposal and was ready to give the Communists all the information he had and to questions concerning his activities." To prove his bona fides to Soviet intelligence, Moszulski conveyed a list of Polish exiles and Polish-Americans, including an evaluation of how they stood on Polish-Soviet relations.

Steel's cover name assigned by Soviet intelligence and deciphered by Arlington Hall cryptographers is DICKY, DICKI and DIKI.

== Works ==
- Hitler as Frankenstein
- The Second World War
- Men Behind the War
- The Future of Europe
- The John Steel Report on World Affairs

== Sources ==
- Obituary, New York Times, December 3, 1988
- Judy Holiday's Explanation, FBI File
- John Earl Haynes and Harvey Klehr, Venona: Decoding Soviet Espionage in America (New Haven: Yale University Press, 1999), pg. 240.
- References to Steel in the following Venona project decryptions:
  734 KGB New York to Moscow, 21 May 1944; 1039–1041 KGB New York to Moscow, 24–25 July 1944; 1393 KGB New York to Moscow, 3 October 1944; 1814, 1815 KGB New York to Moscow, 23 December 1944.
