= Onteora Park Historic District =

Historic district in New York, United States

- U.S. National Register of Historic Places
- U.S. Historic district
- Location within New York Location within the United States
- Location: Onteora Club Property, Hunter, New York
- Coordinates: 42°12′36″N 74°9′6″W
- Area: 875 acres (354 ha)
- Built: 1880
- NRHP reference No.: 03000023
- Added to NRHP: February 12, 2003

Onteora Park Historic District is a national historic district located at Hunter in Greene County, New York. The district contains 94 contributing buildings and seven contributing structures. It is composed of a golf course, woodlands, and extensive hiking trails planned during the late 19th century. The small residential area was laid out in 1880.

It was listed on the National Register of Historic Places in 2003.
