= Florence Ballin Cramer =

American painter

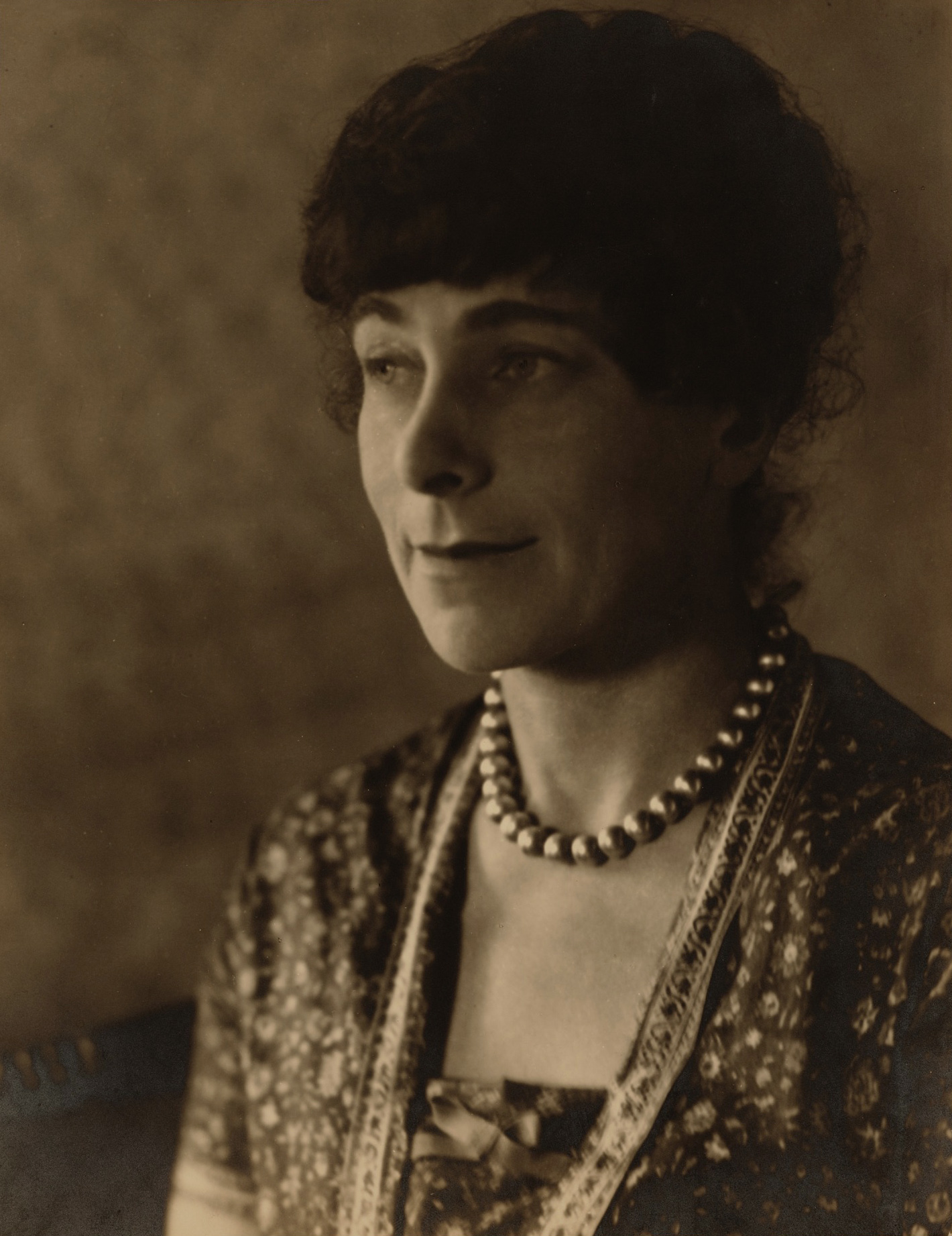
- Cramer in 1928 (photo by Peter A. Juley)
- Born: Florence Julia Ballin; December 13, 1883; Brooklyn, New York
- Died: July 15, 1962 (aged 78); Brooklyn, New York
- Known for: Artist

Florence Ballin Cramer (1877–1971) was an American modernist artist known for her landscapes, still lifes, portraits, and nudes, each tending to have what one close observer called "a clearly expressed a mood or attitude as well as presenting an easily recognizable subject". Describing a retrospective exhibition in 1957, a curator said her paintings were "characterized by a pervasive impressionism which ranges from color-wrought realism to gentle abstraction." Augmenting her career as professional artist, Cramer established and directed an art gallery on 57th Street in Manhattan that was devoted to showing works by young artists and for many years she ran a shop in Woodstock, New York that sold antiques and books. During the early part of her adult life, she divided her time between Manhattan and Woodstock and later lived year-round in Woodstock. After her death, a friend, author Frank Leon Smith, said she had found in Woodstock "just the right place and at precisely the right time for her gifts and talents."

== Early life and training ==
Cramer was born and raised in New York City. Her art instruction began when she was eleven. In 1894, Cramer's widowed mother, Adelaide Ballin, took her and her younger brother to Europe for several years. There, along with The three Rs, she received art instruction from a tutor whom her widowed mother had hired. After the family returned to New York, Cramer finished high school and, in 1902, began study at the Art Students League. Among her teachers there were the American impressionist painter Frank Vincent DuMond and the illustrator Frederick Coffay Yohn. Cramer's long association with the art colony in Woodstock, New York, began in 1909 when she took painting classes from Birge Harrison and John Carlson at the League's summer landscape school in that town. During these years, her fellow students included Hermine Kleinert, Henry Lee McFee, Grace Mott Johnson, and Andrew Dasburg. In 1910, she returned to Europe to visit museums and galleries and to meet with artists in their studios. While in Munich, she met and fell in love with the artist, Konrad Cramer. A year later the two of them married in a London registry office and, on returning to the United States, began spending the warm half of the year in Woodstock and the cooler half in New York.

== Career in art ==
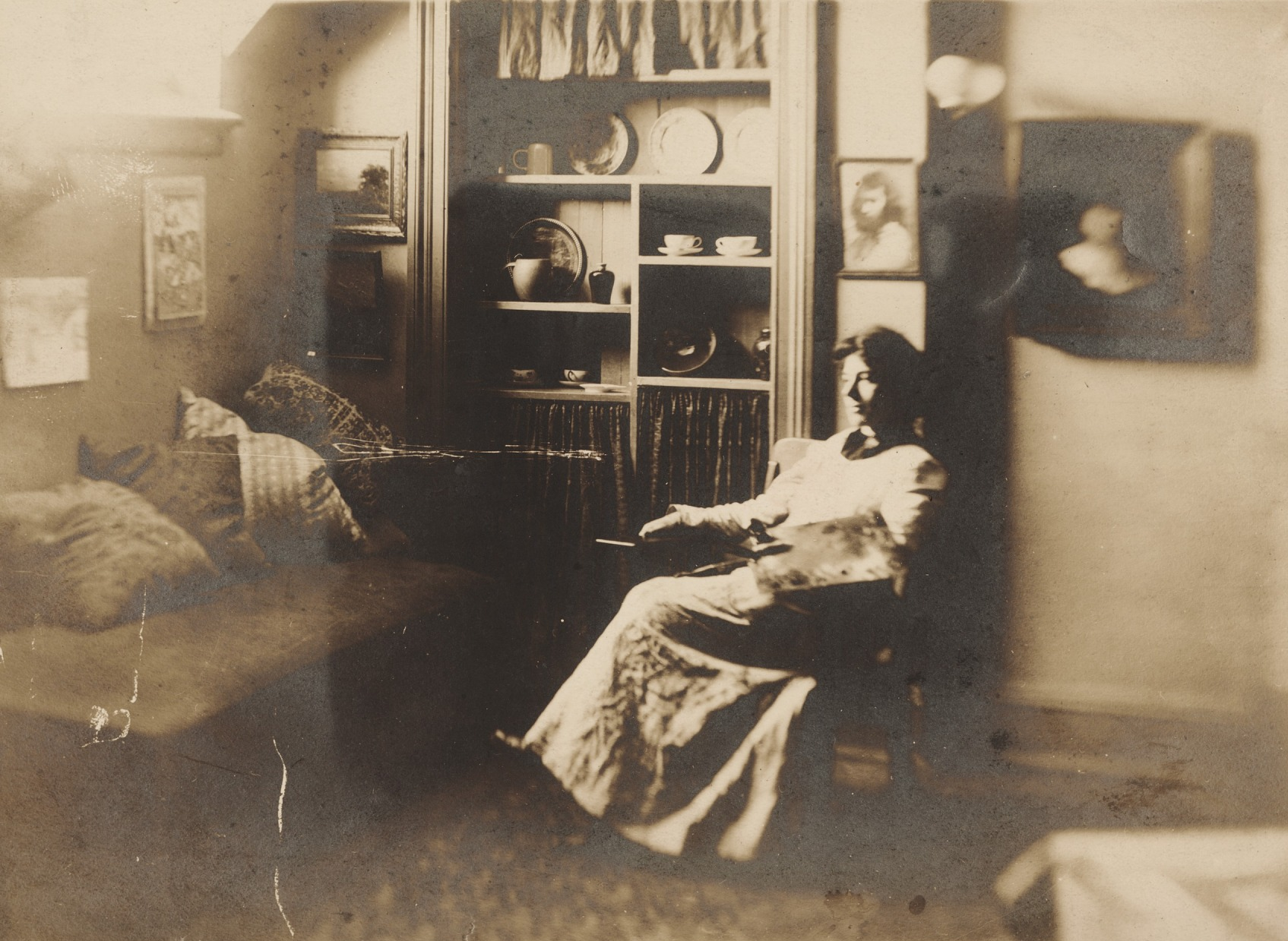
Florence Ballin in her New York studio, c. 1905

One source claims that while she was still a child and traveling in Europe with her family, Cramer submitted a drawing in a contest held by the Herald Tribune and was awarded a silver medal for it. The New York Herald European Edition was probably meant since the Herald Tribune did not then exist. In 1907, she held her first public exhibition in her studio at 30 West 59th Street in Manhattan. Two years later, she showed paintings along with other members of the Woman's Art Club at Knoedler's Gallery in Manhattan. She continued to exhibit with this group over the next few years. A critic for the Brooklyn Daily Eagle praised work in the 1909 show as "distinguished for careful handling" and called Cramer's painting, The Hill Road, "an honest work, thoroughly done." A critic for The New York Times said her painting called Margot in the 1910 show contained "some charming drawing and tells at a distance fairly well, but the delicacy with which the profile is modeled is somewhat sacrificed by the lack of delicacy in the relation between the figure and the background."

In 1917, she exhibited with the Society of Independent Artists and a few years later was one of the modernists in Woodstock who were said to have displaced the traditionalists in an exhibition held by the Woodstock Artists' Association. In 1922, now living year-round in Woodstock, raising her two daughters, and engaged in two business ventures, Cramer began a life-long practice of participating in exhibitions held by the Woodstock Artists' Association, to which she belonged. The exhibition caused commotion locally as she and other young Woodstock artists were said to have taken over the association so as to display their "extreme work". A year later she was credited with reviving an old tradition when she showed an embroidered landscape at the Woodstock gallery. Eight years later, her work again appeared in a New York gallery; this time at Marie Harriman's in a group exhibition with other young American artists. Reviewing this show, Edward Alden Jewell of The New York Times credited her with "an appreciation of the sensuous appeal residing in paint itself" and said that in one of her paintings, Boat Landing, she achieved "really bewitching phrases". Summarizing her work, he wrote: "Here is verse that considerably more than scans." In reviewing the show, the Chicago Evening Post printed a photo of Boat Landing and a critic for the Times Union of Brooklyn said she and two other artists in the show had produced paintings that were "stunning expositions of the American landscape and which have also individual strength and pictorial value." Cramer's other shows in 1931 included a traveling exhibition sponsored by the College Art Association, that year's Carnegie International, and Marie Harriman's Christmas exhibition. The following year, she contributed paintings to the Whitney Biennial, another College Art Association traveling show, and a group exhibition at the Worcester Art Museum.

Florence Ballin Cramer, Self Portrait, c. 1930, oil on board, 19 x 15.5 inches

In November 1932, Cramer was given a solo exhibition at the Warwick Galleries in Philadelphia. A critic for the Philadelphia Public Register noted that artists such as Cramer, who gathered in a small geographic area would naturally take inspiration both from each other's work and from the locale itself. The critic said Cramer showed these influences but possessed nonetheless "a flavor of her own." The critic added, "There are two distinct moods in these landscapes: one bold and rural; the other subtle and sensitive, and it is these two moods, coupled with a nice feeling for still-life decoration, that render Mrs. Cramer's exhibition so varied."

During the middle years of the 1930s, Cramer participated frequently in group shows at New York galleries. These included the Whitney, Marie Harriman's, Macy's and Wanamaker's, the Corcoran, and the Pennsylvania Academy. Writing in the New York Evening Post, Margaret Breuning said that Cramer's paintings in the 1935 Marie Harriman show had "distinction and charm." At this time, she also continued to show work in Woodstock and in 1936 was given a solo exhibition at the Albany Institute of History and Art. A broad survey of American art edited by Holger Cahill and Alfred H. Barr Jr. and published in 1935 listed Cramer as a contemporary painter who was producing valuable work.

Cramer continued to exhibit in Woodstock during the late 1930s and early 1940s and in 1945 was given a solo exhibition at the Rudolph Galleries in that town. Providing, as a critic noted, an opportunity to evaluate her painting career, the show contained a broad cross section of Cramer's work including still lifes, flowers, landscapes, portraits, and nudes. Calling the paintings, "compact in design and powerful in color", the critic praised Cramer's "fine and sensitive style, [in which] clarity and constructive vigor are exceptional." Another critic observed "distinguished painting, technically fluid and with warm poetic vision" in the works on display and said "Mrs. Cramer has a strong rich palette, even the blacks have a penetrating glow and her sensitive rusty reds and tawny yellows weave exquisite color design with the brilliant use of grays." Reviewing another solo exhibition, held in 1953 in another Woodstock gallery, a critic called Cramer, "a painter of great facility with an unusual approach to each of her subjects, equally at home in landscapes, portraits and still lifes." Along with a continuing presence in group exhibitions at Woodstock galleries, Cramer had one last solo show during her life, a collection of fifty paintings, including landscapes, portraits, still lifes, and nudes, which appeared in the Brooklyn campus of Long Island University in 1957.

In 1968, the Woodstock Artists Association mounted a memorial exhibition to Cramer and her husband, Konrad. In the announcement of the show, Woodstock artist Arnold Blanch said "Florence Cramer's paintings reflect her love of people and the things of this world. Many of them have found their way into numerous museums and private collections." Five years later the Woodstock School of Art establish a Florence Ballin Cramer memorial scholarship to provide a student a full summer's tuition annually.

=== Artistic style ===
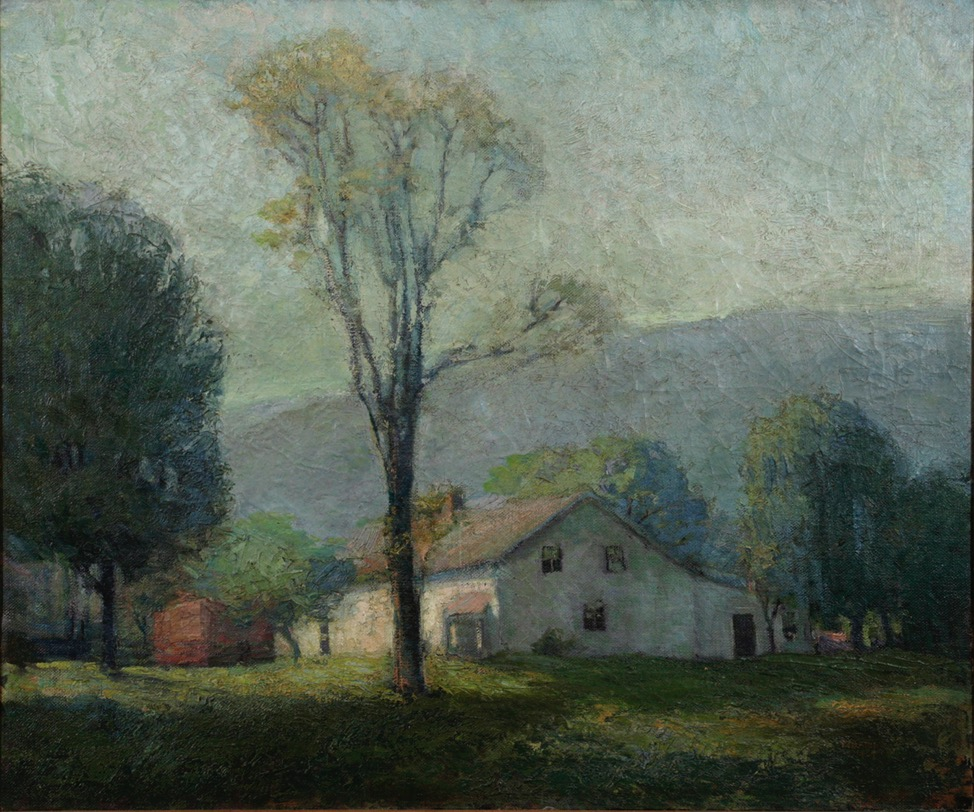
Lasher House, 1909, oil on board, 19 x 15 1/2 inches

Reclining Nude, c. 1930, oil on canvas, 24 x 26 inches

Still Life with Theatrical Masks, 1938, oil on board, 20 x 16 inches

Chicken House in Spring, c. 1945, oil on canvas board, 17 x 21 inches

Cramer Homestead in Winter, 1926, oil on board, 20 x 24 inches

Konrad Cramer, Barns, c. 1930, silver gelatin print, 6 x 9 3/8 inches

In the early 1920s, along with other Woodstock modernists such as George Bellows, Eugene Speicher, and Leon Kroll, Conrad began painting what one source calls "site-specific landscapes" that clearly expressed a mood or attitude as well as presenting an easily recognizable subject. Soon thereafter, with Alexander Brook, and Andrew Dasburg, she painted still lifes, portraits, and nudes in what this source called "Woodstock's studio movement". The style she adopted in these early years persisted throughout her career. She worked mostly in oil on canvas and less often in gouache on paper.

Cramer's landscape technique can be seen in the images from 1909 (Lasher House, above) and 1945 (Chicken House in Spring, above). It can also be seen in the contrast between her painting of the place where they lived and her husband's photograph of the same seen (above). An example of her handling of nude portraits can be seen in Reclining Nude (above). An example of her handling of still lifes can be seen in Still Life with Theatrical Masks (above). Her handling of portraits can be seen in the self-portrait above.

In the mid-1920s, Cramer joined other Woodstock artists in a third major trend: an appreciation of American folk art. With her husband, she collected furniture, fabrics, and other products. She decorated and resold some of these in her shop. She also produced folk art, including, for example, a needlework landscape that she made in 1923.

Reviewing an exhibition of 1932, a critic discussed Cramer's expression of emotion and handling of color, writing: "What Mrs. Cramer gives us is an emotional reaction to the country in which she lives. Her palette, with its deep greens, red browns, grays, reds, orange, and white finds congenial subject matter in winter and fall landscapes, although it occasionally falls under the spell of spring and of deep green summertime."

Another critic, writing in 1945, said Cramer's work was "distinguished painting, technically fluid and with warm poetic vision" and added, "Light shifts over solidly built-up form and her design is unconfused and fine."

Commenting on a 1957 exhibition of fifty paintings produced in a span of fifty years, the show's curator said Cramer's work was "characterized by a pervasive impressionism which ranges from color-wrought realism to gentle abstraction."

=== Florence Gallery ===
In 1918, Cramer negotiated a lease for gallery space in a building at 40 West 57th Street in Manhattan. She opened the Florence Gallery in the fall of 1919 intending to show works by contemporary American artists whose opportunities to exhibit were then few and relatively insignificant. In her announcement of the new venture, she told prospective patrons: "I am opening a gallery, small, not pretentious, where I shall have on exhibition the work of a few modern artists many of whom are known, but because they are not conservative and not dead yet the public has been afraid to buy. These pictures will be offered to the public at very moderate sums because the artists being young have faith in their ability to create more work." In March 1920, a critic for the New York Globe described the artists whose work was then on view as "contemporary American painters of modernistic persuasion". Although she was able to maintain the gallery for not much more than a year, she was able to arrange sales of paintings by artists who would later become well known, including Yasuo Kuniyoshi, Henry Lee McFee, Eugene Speicher, Alexander Brook, Ernest Fiene and Stefan Hirsch.

== Antique and art book shop ==
In the mid-1920s, when Woodstock artists began to appreciate and emulate American folk art, Cramer and her husband began a business that aimed to provide artists with examples of furniture, fabrics and other folk artifacts. They began selling art books at a local summer market and soon afterward Cramer opened a shop in their home in which she sold art books, antique furniture and furnishings, antiques, and both old and modern art prints. Eventually, the shop expanded to include Indian jewelry, rugs and fabrics, original drawings, and various gift merchandise among its offerings.

Cramer had previously begun an informal folk-like process of buying second hand furniture and then reconditioning and painting it for resale to collectors. She continued that practice after opening the shop, adding those artifacts to the store's merchandise.

== Personal life and family ==
Cramer was born in Brooklyn on December 13, 1883. Her birth name was Florence Julia Ballin. Her parents were Jacob Ballin (1833–1887) and Adelaide Marx Ballin (1845–1922). Her father, who died when she was three, ran a successful manufacturing business. Born in Germany, he emigrated to New York and, aged 23 in 1856, began making and selling men's shirts in a business on Nassau Street in lower Manhattan. When his brother Moritz became his partner in 1877, the firm became known as Ballin Brothers and it survived under that name after Jacob's death and into the twentieth century. Cramer had two older brothers and four older and one younger sister, although only three of the six survived to become adults. After her father's death, her mother had sufficient income to support Cramer and her brother without having to work for a living. They were able to spend long periods traveling in Europe and during this time Cramer was able to become fluent in German.

After she and her husband returned from Europe to the United States, they began dividing their time between summers in Woodstock and winters in Manhattan, but after the birth of their first daughter, Adelaide Margot (called Margot) in 1914 and their second, Aileen (called Skip) in 1917, they moved permanently to Woodstock. Cramer later explained that she was forced to "choose between my husband and my career" when he "announced that he didn't want to live in the city any more". "Naturally," she added, "we returned to Woodstock to live all year around." Because the young family could not survive on art sales made by Cramer and her husband, they turned to other ventures to supplement their income. Konrad Cramer began a textile design business and Florence Ballin Cramer embarked on two retail enterprises, first expanding the informal antiques business she had begun some years earlier and second opening the Florence Gallery in Manhattan.

After the Cramers began living in Woodstock year-round, they bought a pre-Revolutionary house in a part of town called Bearsville flats and it was there that Cramer operated her antiques-and-art-books shop. As one source notes, "The Cramers were deeply immersed in Woodstock life, participating in the annual Maverick festivals, the Woodstock Artists Association, the Historical Society, and other organizations, hosting meetings and serving as officers of many committees and organizations that presented and supported artwork in their community. They enjoyed a rich social life there among fellow artists at frequent parties and festivals, where Konrad provided entertainment with his fiddle and both Cramers memorialized events in countless photographs."

In 1939, Cramer was in an automobile accident in which she suffered a skull fracture and other serious injuries. Later called a "near-death" experience, the accident left her unconscious during the first two days of lengthy hospitalization.

Cramer died in Woodstock on July 15, 1962.
