= Josephine Miles Lewis =

American Impressionist artist

Josephine Miles Lewis (10 March 1865 – 11 May 1959) was an American Impressionist artist. The first student, female or otherwise, to graduate from Yale University with a bachelor's in Fine Arts and the university’s second female graduate overall, Lewis was known for her portraits of children.

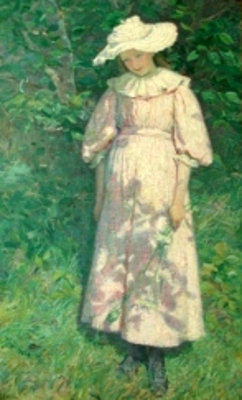
"Girl in the Sunshine" by Josephine Miles Lewis, at the Yale University Art Gallery

== Early life ==
Josephine Miles Lewis was born in 1865 in New Haven, Connecticut. In her childhood and young adulthood her father, Henry Gould Lewis, was the mayor of New Haven for four terms.

== Time at Yale ==
The Yale School of Art was one of the few at the University open to women as well as men, on the request of donor Augustus Russell Street. As a result, women made up a high percentage of the school's attendees, though Lewis was the first to graduate with a degree from the School of Art, earning a certificate in 1887 and a bachelor's in fine arts in 1891.

== Career after Yale ==
Lewis spent the five years after her graduation studying Impressionist art in Paris and Giverny, along with her sister Matilda. She was one of a number of art students who made a pilgrimage to Giverny, France to be in the presence of Claude Monet, staying at the Baudy hotel near Monet's home. Lewis split her professional life between New Haven, New York and Scituate, Massachusetts.

== Works ==
Works by Lewis are owned by the Yale University Art Gallery, the Boston Museum of Fine Arts, and the Farnsworth Art Museum, among others.
