= Mary Garrard =

American art historian

- Born: 1937 (age 88–89)
- Occupation: Art historian
- Awards: Lifetime Achievement Award, Women's Caucus for Art (2005)

Academic background
- Education: Johns Hopkins University; Harvard University

Academic work
- Discipline: Feminist art history
- Institutions: American University
- Main interests: Artemisia Gentileschi
- Notable works: Artemisia Gentileschi: The Image of the Female Hero in Italian Baroque Art (1989); The Power of Feminist Art: The American Movement of the 1970s, History and Impact (1996)

Mary DuBose Garrard (born 1937) is an American art historian and emerita professor at American University. She is recognized as "one of the founders of feminist art theory" and is particularly known for her work on the Baroque painter Artemisia Gentileschi.

== Education ==
Garrard earned her B.A. degree at H. Sophie Newcomb Memorial College in 1958, her M.A. degree at Harvard University in 1960, and her Ph.D. at Johns Hopkins University in 1970. writing her dissertation on "The Early Sculpture of Jacopo Sansovino—Florence and Rome."

== Work ==
From 1974 to 1976, Garrard served as the second national president of the Women’s Caucus for Art.

Garrard's feminist scholarship began with articles in the 1970s, including "Of Men, Women and Art: Some Historical Reflections" (Art Journal, 1976) and "Feminism: Has It Changed Art History?" (Heresies, 1978).

With Norma Broude, Garrard co-authored and edited several books on art history and curated an exhibition, Claiming Space: Some American Feminist Originators, in 2007 at the Katzen Arts Center.

== Selected publications ==
- Artemisia Gentileschi: The Image of the Female Hero in Italian Baroque Art (Princeton: Princeton University Press, 1989), ISBN 9780691002859
- Artemisia Gentileschi Around 1622: The Shaping and Reshaping of an Artistic Identity (University of California Press, 2001), ISBN 9780520228412
- Brunelleschi's Egg: Nature, Art, and Gender in Renaissance Italy (University of California Press, 2010), ISBN 9780520261525
- Artemisia Gentileschi and Feminism in Early Modern Europe (Reaktion, 2020), ISBN 9781789142020

=== With Norma Broude ===
- Feminism and Art History: Questioning the Litany (Harper & Row, 1982), ISBN 9780064301176
- The Expanding Discourse: Feminism and Art History (Icon Editions, 1992), ISBN 9780064302074
- The Power of Feminist Art: The American Movement of the 1970s, History and Impact (Harry N. Abrams, 1996), ISBN 9780810926592
- Reclaiming Female Agency: Feminist Art History after Postmodernism (University of California Press, 2005), ISBN 9780520242524
- Claiming Space: Some American Feminist Originators (American University, 2007)

== Awards ==
- Lifetime Achievement Award, Women’s Caucus for Art, 2005
- Faculty Legacy Award, American University, voted by CAS alumni as professor who had greatest influence on their lives, 2002
- Award from College Art Association, Committee on Women, for “pioneering feminist scholarship” (with Norma Broude), 2000
- Honorary doctorate of humane letters, awarded by Millsaps College, Jackson, Mississippi, 1999
- Mississippi Institute of Arts and Letters Award (with Norma Broude), 1995
- Mid-Career Achievement Award, National Women’s Caucus for Art, 1991
- AU College of Arts and Sciences award, Outstanding Scholarship, Research & Other Professional Contributions, 1990
- AU College of Arts and Sciences award, Outstanding Teaching, 1989

=== Grants and sponsored research ===
- American University Mellon Fund Travel Award, September 1998
- National Endowment for the Humanities, Fellowship, 1991–92
- J. Paul Getty Foundation, subvention to Princeton University Press to support publication of Artemisia Gentileschi, 1987
- Mina Shaughnessy Scholars Program Fund for the Improvement of Post-Secondary Education, Department of Education, 1982
- American Association of University Women Fellowship, 1978–79
- American Council of Learned Societies, 1978–79
- Fulbright scholar, Italy, 1963–64
