= Norma Broude =

American art historian (born 1941)

- Born: 1 May 1941 (age 85); New York, US
- Education: Columbia University; Hunter College
- Occupation: Art historian
- Employer(s): Oberlin College; Vassar College; American University

Norma Broude (born 1 May 1941) is an American art historian and scholar of feminism and 19th-century French and Italian painting. She is also a Professor Emerita of art history from American University. Broude, with Mary Garrard, is an early leader of the American feminist movement and both have redefined feminist art theory.

== Life and work ==
She was born Norma Freedman on 1 May 1941 in New York. She holds a Master of Arts and Doctor of Philosophy in Art History from Columbia University and a Bachelor of Arts in Art History and English from Hunter College.

Broude taught for a short time at Oberlin College, then Vassar College and Columbia University. In 1975 she was called to the American University and stayed there until retirement.

She has written scholarship on female contribution to 20th-century art movements.

== Awards ==
- 2000 – Committee on Women in the Arts presented their annual recognition award at the College Art Association.
- 1981 – National Endowment for the Humanities
- 1962 – Scholarship Woodrow Wilson National Fellowship Foundation

== Publications ==
- Gauguin’s Challenge: New Perspectives After Postmodernism, 2018, ISBN 978-1-5013-2516-8
- Reclaiming Female Agency: Feminist Art History After Postmodernism, edited by Norma Broude with Mary D. Garrard, 2005, ISBN 978-0-5202-4252-4
- Gustave Caillebotte: And the Fashioning of Identity in Impressionist Paris, Norma Broude 2002, ISBN 978-0-81353-0-185
- The Power of Feminist Art: The American Movement of the 1970s, History and Impact, with Mary D. Garrard 1996, ISBN 978-0-8109-2659-2
- The Expanding Discourse: Feminism and Art History, with Mary D. Garrard 1992, ISBN 978-0-06430-2-074
- Impressionism: A Feminist Reading: The Gendering of Art, Science, and Nature in the Nineteenth Century, Norma Broude 1991, ISBN 978-0-84781-3-971
- Feminism and Art History: Questioning the Litany, with Mary D. Garrard 1982, ISBN 978-0-0643-0117-6
- Seurat in Perspective. Norma Broude, 1978, ISBN 978-0-13807-1-073
- The Macchiailoli: Academicism and Modernism in Nineteenth Century Italian Painting, Norma Broude, Columbia 1967, ISBN 978-0-30003-5-476
- World Impressionism: The International Movement, 1860-1920, Norma Broude (ed.) 1994, ISBN 978-0-81098-1-157 (featured in the Seinfeld episode "The Bookstore")
