= Amanda Brewster Sewell =

American painter (1859–1926)

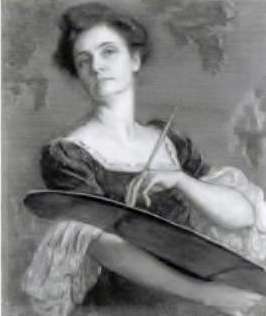
- Self-portrait, 1904, National Academy of Design
- Born: Lydia Amanda Brewster; February 24, 1859; North Elba, New York
- Died: November 15, 1926 (aged 67); Florence, Italy
- Education: Cooper Union; Art Students League of New York; Académie Julian, Paris
- Known for: Painter of portraits and genre scenes
- Notable work: Arcadia, mural; The Sacred Hecatomb, painting
- Awards: See Awards section below

Lydia Amanda Brewster Sewell (February 24, 1859 - November 15, 1926) was a 19th-century American painter of portraits and genre scenes. Lydia Amanda Brewster studied art in the United States and in Paris before marrying her husband, fellow artist Robert Van Vorst Sewell. She won a bronze medal for her mural Arcadia at The World's Columbian Exposition in 1893. She continued to win medals at expositions and was the first woman to win a major prize at the National Academy of Design, where she was made an Associate Academian in 1903. She was vice president of the Woman's Art Club of New York by 1906. Her works are in several public collections.

== Early life ==
Lydia Amanda Brewster, the daughter of Benjamin T. Brewster and Julia Ann Washburn Brewster, was born in North Elba, New York on February 24, 1859. Sewell painted William Brewster, a Mayflower passenger and one of her ancestors, when she was a young girl.

== Education ==
In 1876, Sewell studied in the antique class of the National Academy of Design. She studied with Swain Gifford and Douglas Volk at the Cooper Union, the Art Students League of New York under William Sartain and William Merritt Chase In Paris, she studied under Tony Robert-Fleury and William-Adolphe Bouguereau at the Académie Julian; She also studied at Émile-Auguste Carolus-Duran's atelier and in 1886 exhibited at the Paris Salon for the first time and again in 1887 and 1888.

== Marriage ==
She married Robert Van Vorst Sewell, a painter, on April 12, 1888. He was born in 1860 and became an Associate National Academian in 1901. The couple lived on Long Island, New York in the Fleetwood House in Oyster Bay. designed by her husband. He learned to be a sculptor to create wood carvings and sculptures for the house, fashioned after Medieval designs. American Homes and Gardens said it was among the country's most notable residences. They were on the Social Register in 1918. One of their sons, William Joyce Sewell, married Marion Brown, the daughter of artist Bolton Brown.

== Career ==
After having completed her studies in Paris, Sewell opened a studio in New York. She painted portraits, including Mrs. Peter Cooper Hewitt, Mrs. Helen Jennings Ranger (wife of Henry Ward Ranger), Mrs. Flora Bigelow Dodge (wife of Charles Stuart Dodge, mother of Lucie Bigelow Rosen and Johnnie Dodge), and her husband, Robert Van Vorst Sewell. She was also a decorative painter. The National Academy of Design said that her "artistic tendencies were stimulated by the mountain scenery around her home and before she received any instruction she attained considerable facility in the use of color."

In 1888, Sewell won the Norman W. Dodge Prize at the National Academy of Design. Sewell exhibited her work at the Palace of Fine Arts and the Woman's Building at the 1893 World's Columbian Exposition in Chicago, Illinois. She was awarded a bronze medal for was Arcadia, a side mural for the Hall of Honor of the Woman's Building. Kirsten Swinth says that "Amanda Brewster Sewell's Arcadia displayed her ability to paint the human figure, develop complex compositions, and manage the subject matter of history painting." Other works exhibited include Pleasures of the Past, Sylvan Festival, Mother and Son and By the River.

World's Columbian Exposition 1893

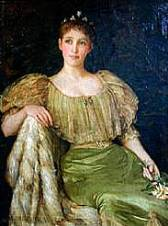
Portrait of a Lady, by 1893

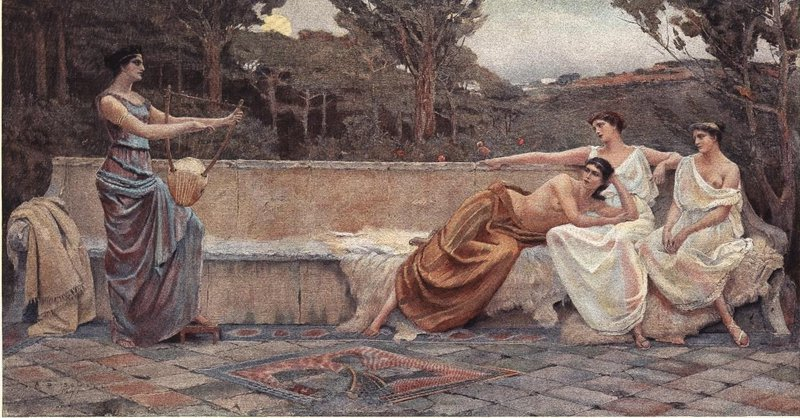
Sappho, 1891

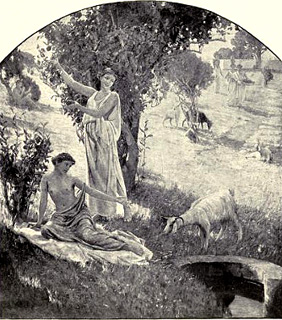
Arcadia mural, 1893 World's Exposition (black/white photograph)

Sewell exhibited A Pastoral, A Sylvan Festival, and Pleasures of the Past at the Pennsylvania Academy of the Fine Arts exhibition between December 21, 1896 – February 22, 1897. She won a bronze medal at the 1901 Pan-American Exposition, a silver medal at the 1902 Charleston Exposition in South Carolina, a bronze medal at the 1904 St. Louis Exposition, and the Thomas B. Clarke prize for best figure composition at the 1904 National Academy of Design exhibition in New York for The Sacred Hecatomb. The painting, called an "important" work by The Independent, depicts dancing Greek maidens and children leading a procession of cattle to the sacrifice. Harper's Weekly commented, "These joyous figures, moving in a leafy glade into which the sunlight filters, are charming in color and rhythmic movement, and as a piece of admirably conceived and executed decorative painting it stands alone in the collection." She was the first woman to earn a major prize at the National Academy.

Her self-portrait was an Associate National Academian (ANA) diploma presentation on March 7, 1904; It was also exhibited with in the National Academy of Design Portraits exhibition held by the National Arts Club in 1916. By 1906 she was vice president and member of the selection jury of the Woman's Art Club of New York, which was formed in 1890 as a social club for women interested in art and as a forum to exhibit women artist's works.

== Death ==
Sewell died in 1926 in Florence, Italy. Her husband, Robert Van Vorst Sewell died in 1924, also in Florence.

== Collections ==
Columbia University	William Robert Ware (1832 - 1915), 1902
Farnsworth Art Museum	Portrait of Julie and Jackie, c. 1913
National Academy of Design	Robert Van Vorst Sewell (1860 - 1924), c. 1901; Self-portrait, 1904; Portrait of a Woman (Mrs. Helen Jennings Ranger), 1906
University of the South, University Art Gallery	Portrait of Mrs. Louise Claiborne-Armstrong, 1921
Williams College Museum of Art	William Dwight Whitney (1827-1894), 1895
Caramoor Center for Music and the Arts/Rosen House	Flora (Bigelow) Dodge, 1901; Lucie Bigelow Dodge, 1901

== Awards ==
- National Academy of Design Norman W. Dodge prize
  1888
- World's Columbian Exposition Bronze Medal
  1893 Mural
- Pan-American Exposition Bronze Medal
  1901
- Charleston Exposition Silver Medal
  1901-1902
- St. Louis Exposition Bronze Medal
  1904
- National Academy of Design Thomas B. Clarke prize
  1904 The Sacred Hecatomb – Best figure composition
