= Global Feminisms =

Global Feminisms was a feminist art exhibition that originally premiered at the Elizabeth A. Sackler Center for Feminist Art at the Brooklyn Museum, New York City, United States, in March 2007. The exhibition was co-curated by Maura Reilly and Linda Nochlin and consists of work by 88 women artists from 62 countries. Global Feminisms showcased art across many mediums, all trying to answer the question "what is feminist art?". The show was visually anchored by the installation of Judy Chicago's The Dinner Party.

== About ==
Global Feminisms (at the Brooklyn Museum March 23–July 1, 2007) was one of the first international exhibitions exclusively dedicated to feminist art, from 1990 to 2007 (see also WACK! Art and the Feminist Revolution). The exhibition was co-curated by Maura Reilly and Linda Nochlin and consists of work by 88 women artists from 62 countries. Global Feminisms showcased work in all media forms, including painting, sculpture, photography, film, video, installation, and performance, with a focus on contemporary feminist art from a global perspective. Conceived as a counterpoint to the landmark 1976 exhibition Women Artists: 1550–1950, the curators aimed to move beyond a Western exclusionary feminism, which has dominated understandings of feminism and feminist art since the 1970s, towards one that is less-defined by a western center and "other" peripheries.

The exhibition included a catalogue with essays by Maura Reilly, Linda Nochlin, N'Goné Fall, Geeta Kapur, Michiko Kasahara, Virginia Pérez-Ratton, Élisabeth Lebovici, Joan Kee, and Charlotta Kotik.

== Themes ==
The Global Feminisms exhibition was arranged by theme, whereas the exhibition catalog was organized geographically. The question that surrounded the exhibition is 'what is feminist art?'. There are a number of definitions of feminist art, therefore, there are several themes throughout the exhibition. The exhibition was displayed in a space that is anchored by the permanent installation of Judy Chicago's Dinner Party, as installed by Maura Reilly. Themes within the exhibition included openness, multiculturalism, variety, and gender inequality. Global Feminisms explored feminist issues among women across and within different cultures, races, classes, religions, and sexualities. Themes within these larger overarching thematic patterns included death, pain, old age, war, sex, and motherhood. The installation at the Brooklyn Museum did not follow a linear chronology, but was organized by four categories which the works overlap: life cycles, identities, politics, and emotion. Life cycles consisted of the stages of life from birth to death. Identities investigated the notions of the self, including racial, gender, political, and religious identities. Politics explored the world through women artists who have demonstrated that the political is personal. Emotions presented the conventional idea of women as emotional creatures and victims.

== Reviews and critiques ==
In a written survey conducted after viewing feminist artworks at the Brooklyn Museum, participant responses revealed that participants had a new awareness of feminism. It is said that Global Feminisms jumps back and forth between the success platforms of the marketplace and the institutional stage. It has been critiqued that most of the work within the exhibition is body-oriented and familiar to the point of old-fashioned.

== Artists involved ==
Global Feminisms featured the work of young and mid-career artists, all born after 1960. These include artists included:

- Lida Abdul
- Mequitta Ahujha
- Pilar Albarracín
- Ghada Amer
- Emmanuelle Antille
- Arahmaiani
- Oreet Ashery
- Fiona Banner
- Anna Baumgart
- Rebecca Belmore
- Kate Beynon
- Cass Bird
- Zoulikha Bouabdellah
- Elina Brotherus
- Tania Bruguera
- Ambreen Butt
- Cabello/Carceller (Helena Cabello and Ana Carceller)
- Hsia-Fei Chang
- Mary Coble
- Angela de la Cruz
- Beatrice Cussol
- Amy Cutler
- Monika Larsen Dennis
- Iskra Dimitrova
- Milena Dopitova
- Latifa Echakhch
- Tracey Emin
- Fiona Foley
- Parastou Forouhar
- Maria Friberg
- Regina José Galindo
- Anna Gaskell
- Margi Geerlinks
- Skowmon Hastanan
- Annika von Hausswolff
- He Chengyao
- Elżbieta Jabłońska
- Emily Jacir
- Sonia Khurana
- Katarzyna Kozyra
- Elke Krystufek
- Sigalit Landau
- Lee Bul
- Lin Tianmiao
- Julia Loktev
- Sarah Lucas
- Loretta Lux
- Michèle Magema
- Melanie Manchot
- Teresa Margolies
- Chantal Michel
- Tracey Moffatt
- Priscilla Monge
- Valerie Mrejen
- Wangechi Mutu
- Ingrid Mwangi
- Hiroko Okada
- Catherine Opie
- Tanja Ostojić
- Aude du Pasquier Grall
- Patricia Piccinini
- Lilibeth Cuenca Rasmussen
- Lisa Reihana
- Claudia Reinhardt
- Pipilotti Rist
- Tracey Rose
- Boryana Rossa
- Julika Rudelius
- Jenny Saville
- Tomoko Sawada
- Berni Searle
- Zineb Sedira
- Canan Şenol
- Tejal Shah
- Dayanita Singh
- Sanghee Song
- Sissi
- Ryoko Suzuki
- Sam Taylor-Wood
- Milica Tomić
- Salla Tykka
- Adriana Varejao
- Kara Walker
- Miwa Yanagi
- Yin Xiuzhen
- Miwa Yanagi
- Carey Young

== Publication ==
- Reilly, Maura; Nochlin, Linda, eds. (2007). Global Feminisms: New Directions in Contemporary Art. Merrell. ISBN 9780872731578.
