= Milica Tomić =

Serbian-born contemporary artist and educator (born 1960)

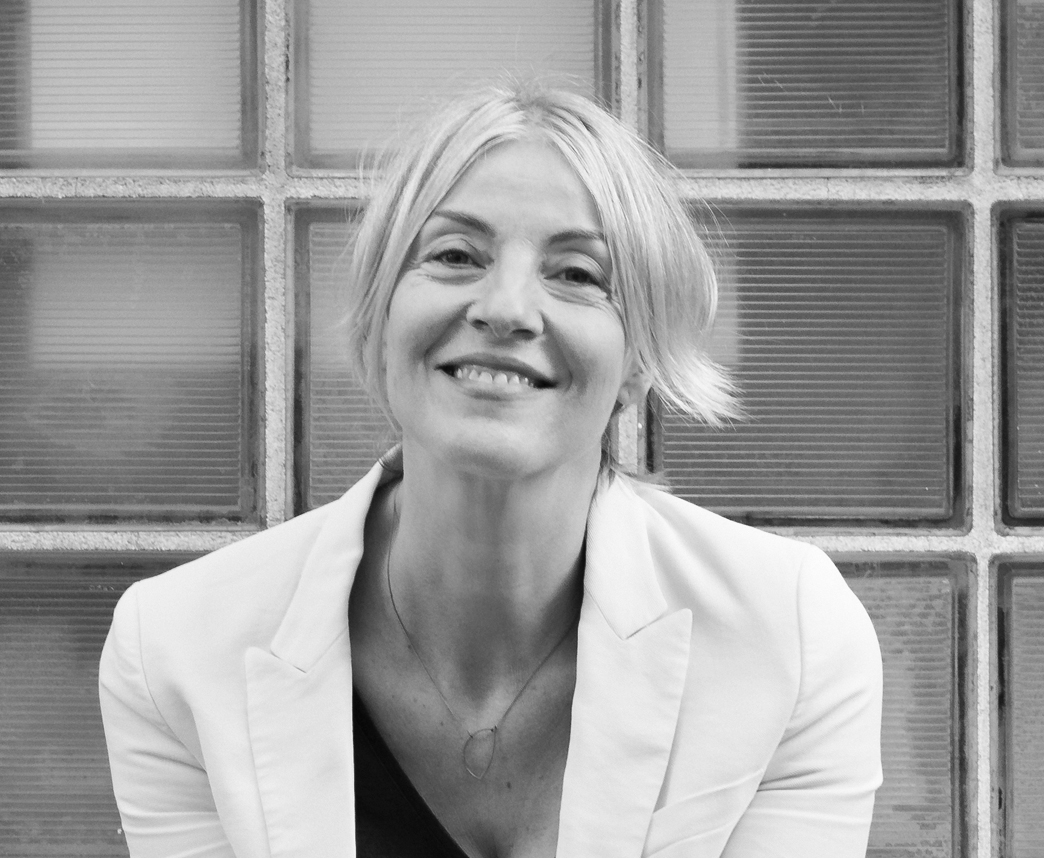
- Born: Belgrade, Yugoslavia

Milica Tomić (born 1960) also known as Milica Tomic, is a Serbian-born contemporary artist and educator. Her artistic practice is research-based and includes working in the mediums of photography, video, installation art and discursive, educational art, performance, and socio-political engagement. She serves as the Chair of the Institute for Contemporary Art at Graz University of Technology in Austria. She has lived in Berlin, Belgrade, and Graz.

== Career ==
Tomić was born in 1960 in Belgrade, Yugoslavia. She graduated with a bachelor's degree (1990) and master's degree (1994) in painting from the Faculty of Fine Arts at the University of Arts in Belgrade.

She has been awarded many artist-in-residency opportunities including at Artpace (2004) in San Antonio, United States; and the DAAD Artist-in-Berlin Programme (2006). In 2011, she had a fellowship as a Humanities Center–SiCa Arts writer/practitioner in residence at Stanford University in Stanford, California.

Her work was part of the group exhibition, Global Feminisms (2007) at the Brooklyn Museum, curated by Maura Reilly and Linda Nochlin.

Since 2014, Tomić is the Chair of the Institute for Contemporary Art (within the Faculty of Architecture) at the Graz University of Technology in Graz, Styria, Austria. From 2014 to 2015, she was a professor at the Trondheim Academy of Fine Art in Trondheim, Norway.

== Artwork ==
Tomić’s work centers on researching, unearthing and bringing to public debate issues related to political and economic violence, trauma and social amnesia, with particular attention to the short circuit between intimacy and politics. As a response to the commitment to social change and the new forms of collectivity it engenders, Tomić has made a marked shift from individual to collective artistic practice.

Her work "I am Milica Tomic" (1999) was created as both a performance and video installation, where she would repeat "I am Milica Tomic" paired with a different national identity, said in the local language. Each time she would announce a new nationality, a new bloody wound would appear on her skin.

Her work "One day, Instead of One Night, a Burst of Machine-Gun Fire will Flash, if Light Cannot Come Otherwise" (2010), was performed at the ISEA International's ISEA2010: 16th International Symposium on Electronic Art in Dortmund, Germany.

She is a founding member of the Yugoslav art and theory group, Grupa Spomenik (or Monument Group), and founder of the cross-disciplinary project and working group of Four Faces of Omarska.

== Exhibitions ==
=== Solo exhibitions ===
- 1999, Milica Tomić, Galerie im Taxispalais, Innsbruck
- 2000, I am Milica Tomić, Camera Austria, Graz
- 2000, Milica Tomić, Museum Arnhem / Museum of Modern Art, Netherlands
- 2000, Milica Tomić, Kunsthalle Wien, project space, Vienna
- 2002, xy-ungelöst – Reconstruction of the Crime, Bildmuseet, Umeå
- 2003, national pavilion/Serbia and Montenegro pavilion, 50th Venice Biennale, Venice
- 2004, Reading Capital, ArtPace, San Antonio, Texas
- 2005, Milica Tomic, Experimental Art Foundation Gallery, Adelaide
- 2006, Alone / Reading Capital, Artspace Sydney, Australia
- 2007, Politics of Memory, Stacion - Center for Contemporary Art, Pristina
- 2010, Milica Tomić, Museum of Contemporary Art, Belgrade, Serbia
- 2012, One Day, Turku Art Museum, Turku, Finland
- 2014, Artists Film International: Burak Delier, Tejal Shah, Milica Tomic, Whitechapel Gallery, London
- 2016, Cinema, School and War of Independence, Charim Gallery, Vienna
- 2020, The Small Letter, Charim Gallery, Vienna
