= Karen Heagle =

American artist (born 1974)

Karen Heagle (born 1974) is an American artist, known for autobiographical and art historical subject matter. Her work comments on contemporary culture through a queer perspective with a focus on feminist agendas.

== Life and education ==
Heagle was born in Tomah, Wisconsin and currently lives in Brooklyn, New York. She received a BFA from the University of Wisconsin–Stout, and an MFA in Painting from Pratt Institute. She also attended Skowhegan School of Painting and Sculpture.

== Work and Exhibition History ==
Past notable solo exhibitions include, Let Nature Take Its Course and Hope It Passes at I-20 in 2011, and Battle Armor at Churner and Churner in 2013. Heagle's group exhibitions include Paper at the Saatchi Gallery in 2013, Interior Dialogue at Sargent's Daughters in 2014, and “Found: Queer Archaeology; Queer Abstraction” at the Leslie-Lohman Museum of Gay and Lesbian Art in 2017.

Heagle's work is included in Judith Rothschild Contemporary Drawing Collection at the Museum of Modern Art in New York, the Saatchi Gallery in London, the Deste Foundation in Athens, Greece, and part of The Elizabeth A. Sackler Center for Feminist Art.

In 2022, Heagle’s works were part of a three person show, Hekate's Grove. with Elizabeth Insogna and Kay Turner, at FiveMyles Gallery. In 2019, Heagle was included in Nylon Magazine's "Ten Contemporary Artists to Get to Know" by Kari Adelaide Razdow.
