= Gallery Soulflower =

Art gallery in Thailand

Coordinates: 13.722180°N 100.520637°E

- Gallery Soulflower in Thailand
- Founded: 2007
- Type: Art gallery
- Location: Bangkok, Thailand
- Services: Contemporary art, mixed media, exhibitions
- Website: Gallery Soulflower

The Gallery Soulflower was an art gallery in Thailand created and managed by Soulflower. It was founded by Amit Sarda and Natasha Tuli, and served as a platform for Indian contemporary artists to present their individual art. The gallery was housed within the Silom Galleria and organized 4-6 exhibitions annually by established and emerging Indian artists from all over the country, and as well as foreign artists. Works on display range from painting, sculpture, photography, and installation art, to new media and conceptual-based art.

Some of the artists who were displayed their work include: Yashwant Deshmukh, B M Kamath, Pooja Iranna, Chintan upadhyay, Vivek Vilasini, Murali Cheeroth, Navin Rawanchaikul, Ranbir Kaleka, Maya Burman, Lavanya Mani, Shefali Nayan, Varunika Saraf, Prajakta Potnis Ponmany, Rirkrit Tiravanija, Viraj Naik, Azis T M, Zakkir Hussain, K P Reji, E H Pushkin, Binoy Varghese, Gigi Scaria, Babu Xavier, Sheba Chhachhi and others.

Contemporary coverage described Gallery Soulflower as the first Bangkok gallery concentrating on art from the Indian continent. In an 2010 article exploring Bangkok's contemporary art scene is said that the gallery had recently closed.
