= Hiroko Okada =

Japanese contemporary artist (born 1970)

- 岡田裕子
- Born: 1970 (age 55–56); Tokyo, Japan
- Other name: Okada Hiroko
- Education: Tama Art University
- Occupation: Visual artist
- Spouse: Makoto Aida
- Children: 1

Hiroko Okada (Japanese: 岡田裕子; born 1970) also known as Okada Hiroko, is a Japanese contemporary artist, known for her provocative work that challenges societal standards around the construct of family, love, childbirth, and child-rearing. She works within the mediums of video art, photography, painting, installation, and performance.

== Biography ==
Hiroko Okada was born in 1970 in Tokyo, Japan. She attended Tama Art University, where she graduated in with a BA degree in painting (1993).

She is married to artist Makoto Aida. Together they have son Torajiro Aida (born in 2001), who is a blockchain software engineer. The family formed an art performance group called "Aidake", in which they mocked the traditional family roles of children in a 2015 performance "Recital" at the Museum of Contemporary Art Tokyo. Okada and Aida have also worked collaboratively on alternative puppet theater troop called "Gekidan Shiki".

"The Delivery by Male Project" (2002) is a video work by Okada about a pregnant man named "S.K." who doesn’t want a family but does want a baby. Okada's artwork was part of the group exhibition "Global Feminisms" (2007) at Brooklyn Museum, curated by Maura Reilly and Linda Nochlin.

Her work is part of public museum collections, including at the Brooklyn Museum.
