= Elżbieta Jabłońska =

Polish visual artist, and professor (born 1970)

- Born: Elżbieta Anna Jabłońska; 1970 (age 55–56); Olsztyn, Poland
- Other names: Elizabeth Jablonska, Elzbieta Jablonska
- Education: Nicolaus Copernicus University in Toruń
- Occupation: Visual artist
- Known for: Photography, installation art, performance art
- Movement: Post-feminism
- Spouse: Jacek Majewski
- Website: Official website

Elżbieta Jabłońska (born 1970) is a Polish contemporary visual artist, and professor. She has served as the Chair of Drawing and has taught art at Nicolaus Copernicus University in Toruń since 1996. Jablonska is known for photography, film, installation art, and performance art. Her artwork engages with Polish stereotypes and myths of women, mothers, and the Catholicism. She lives in Bydgoszcz in northern Poland, in a farming cooperative.

== Early life, education, and family ==
Elżbieta Jabłońska was born in 1970 in Olsztyn, Poland. She studied at Nicolaus Copernicus University in Toruń, where she graduated with a MA degree in 1995.

She is the widow of Polish musician Jacek Majewski (1966–2006), who co-founded the Mózg Club in Bydgoszcz. Together they have a son that is a noted musician and the subject of many of her photographs, Antoni (Antek) Majewski.

== Career ==
Her artwork deals with clichés of femininity found in Catholicism, as artists, and in motherhood in Poland, as well as various types of social exclusion. Jablonska's most famous work is a self-portrait of the artist dressed as Superman with her son Antek on her lap, in the pose of Virgin Mary with the baby; from the "Supermatka" (English: Supermother) (2002) photo series. Her photo series "Przypadkowa Przyjemność" (English: Accidental Pleasure) (2006) documented the food remains of the artist's culinary activities.

Her public artwork "Nowe Zycie" (English: New Life) (2014) is an oversized neon sign mounted on an Agricultural Production Cooperative found in the village Trzeciewiec in Poland. From May to June 2002, her work "Gry Domowe" (English: Household Games) was presented as part of the AMS Outdoor Gallery, a project shown on 400 billboards in the largest Polish cities and led by Marek Krajewski, Dorota Grobelna, and Lechosław Olszewski.

Jablonska's work was recognized through its inclusion in a major international surveys, including the 7th Construction in Process (2000) held at the Regional Museum, Bydgoszcz in Bydgoszcz; and Global Feminisms (2007) held at the Brooklyn Museum, and curated by Maura Reilly and Linda Nochlin. Her work was also part of the group exhibitions "Architectures Of Gender: Contemporary Women’s Art In Poland" at SculptureCenter in Long Island; "Hero Mother: Contemporary Art by Post-Communist Women Rethinking Heroism" (2016) at MOMENTUM Berlin in Berlin, curated by Bojana Pejic and Rachel Rits-Volloch; and "Part 2: Maternality" (2020) at Richard Saltoun Gallery in London.

Jablonska's artwork is part of public museum collections including the Zachęta National Gallery of Art, and ING Polish Art Foundation.
