= Anna Baumgart =

Polish artist (born 1966)

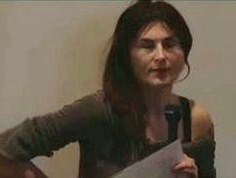
- Baumgart speaking at the Elizabeth A. Sackler Center during the launch of Brooklyn Museum's Global Feminisms exhibition.
- Born: 1966 (age 59–60); Wrocław, Polish People's Republic
- Education: Academy of Fine Arts
- Known for: Sculpture, film
- Political party: Greens 2004
- Movement: Modernism, Abstract art
- Children: Agata Baumgart
- Website: Anna Baumgart on Instagram

Anna Baumgart (born 1966) is a Polish artist, best known for her large installation pieces and film. She is based in Warsaw. While she covers many different issues in her works, "all of them share a preoccupation with repression." Her works are in the permanent collections of several Polish museums.

== Early life and education ==
Baumgart was born in Wrocław in 1966.

In 1994 Baumgart graduated from the department of sculpture of the Academy of Fine Arts, in Gdańsk.

== Career ==
=== Themes ===
Baumgart uses historiography to examine and re-examine the past through art. She also explores how the media can shape the narrative of a historical moment by reducing it to a single iconography. Szum Magazine writes that Baumgart likes to play with history and themes in culture.

Baumgart also examines issues related to gender, such as how to redefine the "notion of 'hysteria' ". She is interested in examining roles relating to motherhood and the system as they shape the mental development of a child.

=== Work ===
In her work, Let Unrestrained Anger Be Eliminated (1996), Baumgart uses technology and the human body to explore the "resonance between maleness and femaleness." She explores the roles of how a child's development is shaped and whether it is through the mother or society in Who's Talking? (1998). Her work I've Got It From My Mother (2002) uses myths and symbols in the photographic and sculptural works of the artist and her daughter Anna Baumgart.

Baumgart used found footage to create Real? (The Cranes Are Flying) (2001). Baumgart's first staged film was Ecstatics, Hysterics and Other Saintly Ladies (2004) and premiered at the Zachęta National Gallery. The film project, Fresh Cherries (2010) examines prostitution in concentration camps. It was created for the exhibition at the Art Centre in Falstad, Norway, where German concentration camp was located during the Second World War.

In 2010, Baumgart collaborated with artist, Agnieszka Kurant, to create Project (...) which is an installation that spanned Chlodna Street where there was once a footbridge linking Jewish communities to one another during World War II.

- Mother (1999)
- Condoms, Money, Lady - No problem! (Prezerwatywy, pieniądze, money, lady - no problem, 1999)

=== Major exhibitions ===
- Media Art Biennale in 1997 and 1999, At The Time of Writing
- Centre for Contemporary Art Zamek Ujazdowski in Warsaw, 1998
- Public Relations, CCA Łaźnia in Gdańsk, 1999
- Sing, Slaves, Bunkier Sztuki Gallery of Contemporary Art, Kraków, Poland, 2014
- Three Plagues, Galeria Labirynt – BWA Lublin, Poland, 2019
- Anna Baumgart. Revolution is not a dinner, Galeria Miejska BWA w Bydgoszczy, 2019

=== Public collections ===
- Zachęta National Gallery of Art
- Silesian Museum in Katowice
- Fonds Régional d’Art Contemporain Poitou-Charentes

== Politics ==
During the 2006 local elections, Baumgart stood as a Greens 2004 candidate for the Warsaw City Council.
