= Chantal Michel =

Swiss artist (born 1968)

Chantal Michel (born 1968) is a Swiss contemporary video, photo, and performance artist. Her photographic series have featured her body as a sculptural subject, where she uses costumes, gestures, and mimicry to blend into the surroundings in both public and private locations. She lives in Thun, Switzerland.

== Education ==
Chantal Michel was born in 1968, in Bern, Switzerland. From 1989 to 1993, Chantal studied ceramics at the Schule für Gestaltung in Bern, Switzerland. Between 1994 and 1998, she studied at the State Academy of Fine Arts Karlsruhe in Karlsruhe, Germany.

== Career ==
Michel held her first known exhibition, In The Summertime (1998), at Galerie Haus Schneider, Uschi Kolb, in Ettlingen, Germany. She has participated in over 30 solo exhibitions and more than 100 group exhibitions. She was included in the international art exhibition at the 49th Venice Biennale (2001) in Venice, Italy; and the Global Feminisms (March 2007) art exhibition at the Elizabeth A. Sackler Center for Feminist Art within the Brooklyn Museum in New York City. In 2026, her installation video Sorry Guys (1997) aired on Souvenirs from Earth TV.

She received the Performance-Förderpreis award in 2002 from the Alexander Clavel-Stiftung charity in Switzerland.

In 2005, she presented a photographic and video exhibition in the closed Schweizerhof Hotel in Bern. The exhibition was the result of several months of work inside the hotel. According to Swissinfo, Michel became "a regular fixture in the Schweizerhof day and night" and looked "for ways to react to the space and create a dialogue with it using her body".

According to the Deutsche Börse Photography Foundation, Michel's images are "outbreaks of the bizarre in a world in which the principle of causality reigns."
