= Lilibeth Cuenca Rasmussen =

Danish artist

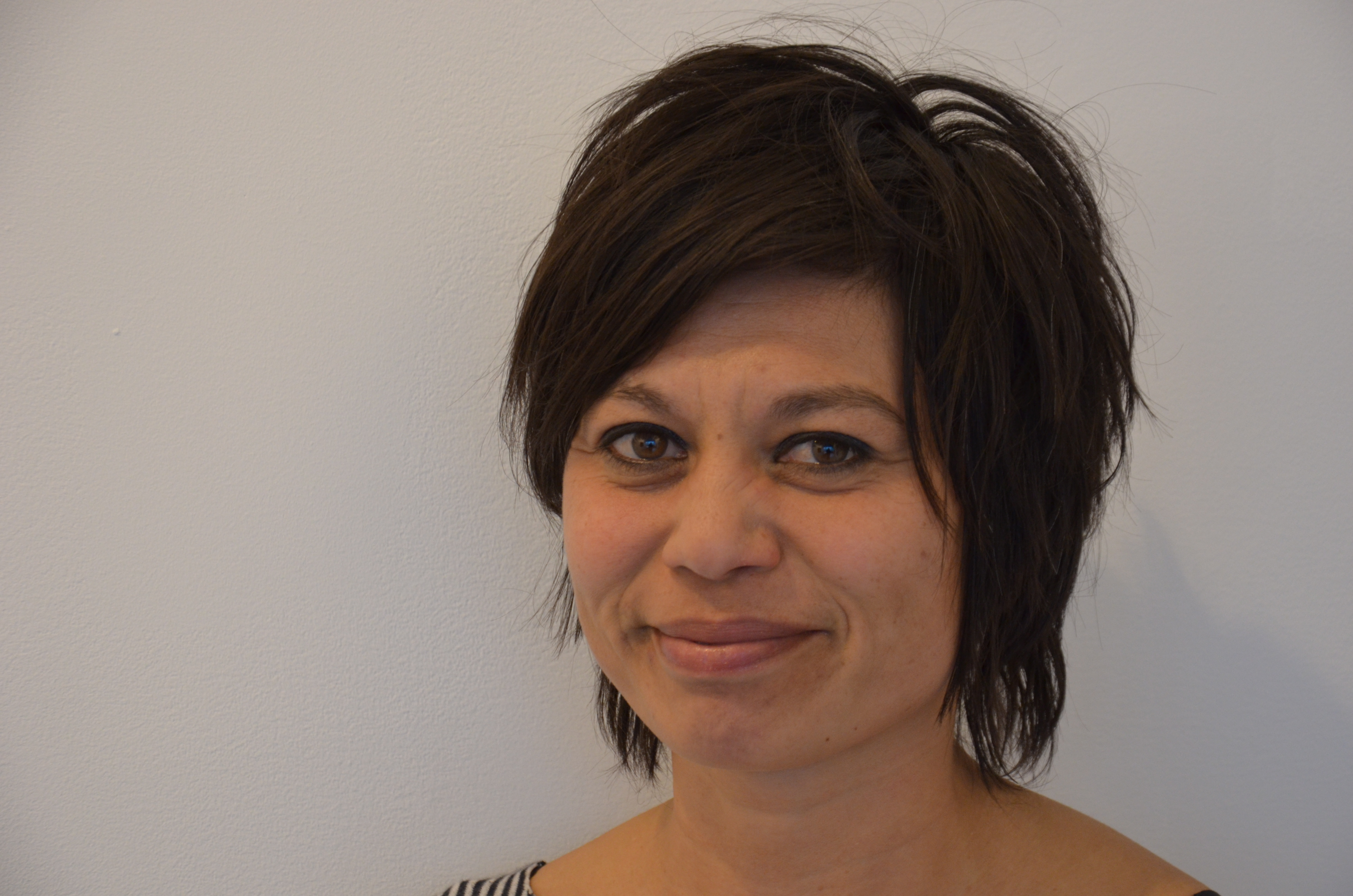
- Born: 1970 (age 54–55); Manila, Philippines
- Education: Royal Danish Academy of Fine Arts
- Known for: Video art, performance art
- Awards: Eckersberg Medal (2008)
- Website: lilibethcuenca.com

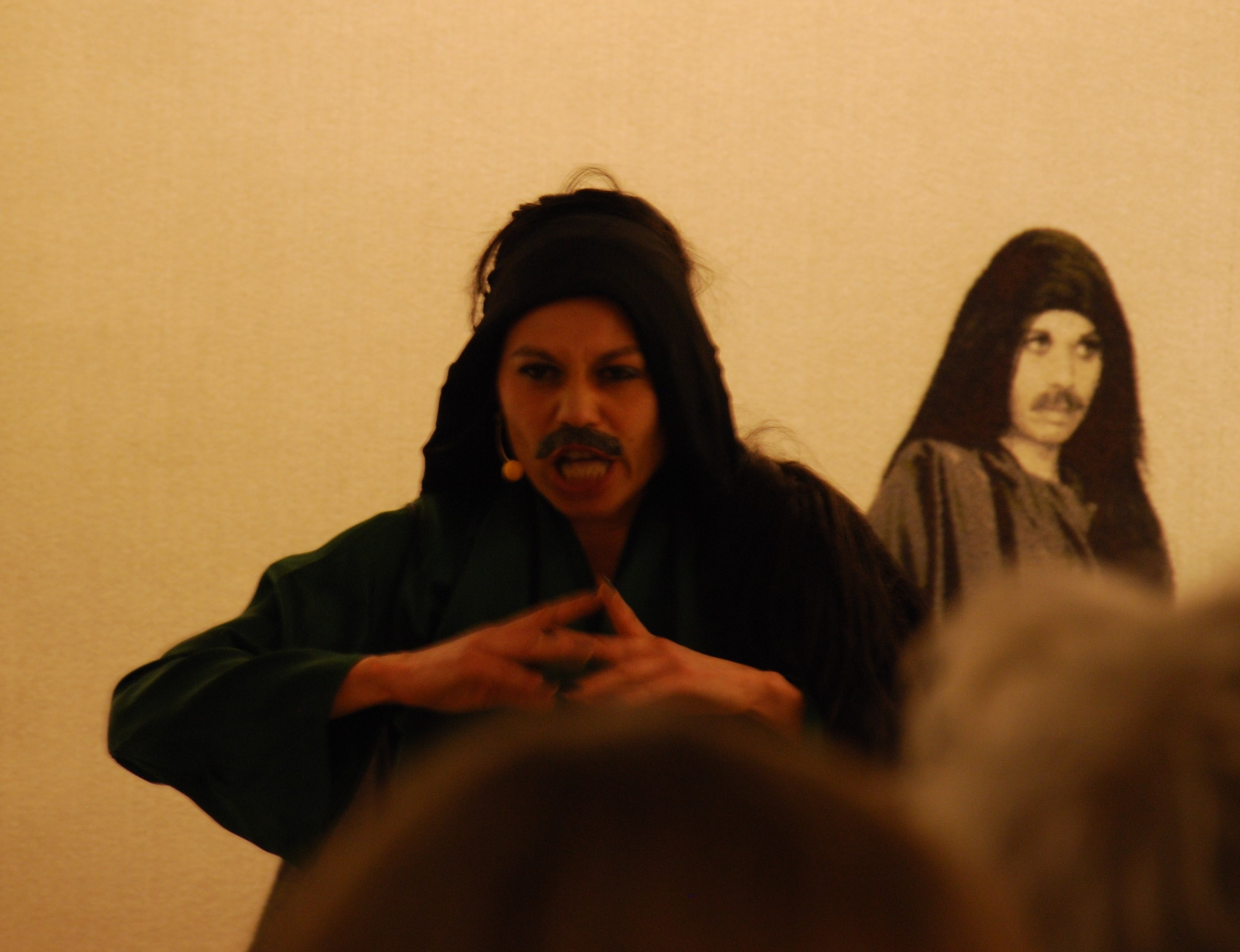
Lilibeth Cuenca Rasmussen, at Galleri Christian Larsen in Stockholm, February 2012

Lilibeth Cuenca Rasmussen (born 27 December 1970 in Manila, Philippines), is a Danish video and performance artist.

== Early life and education ==
Lilibeth Cuenca Rasmussen grow up in Manila and, from the age of eight, in Stevns, Denmark. She studied at the Royal Danish Academy of Fine Arts from 1996-2002 and has been guest lecturer at the Royal Danish Academy of Fine Arts and at Det Fynske Kunstakademi (the Art Academy of Funen) in Odense in Denmark.

== Work ==
In her art, Rasmussen is primarily exploring socio-cultural relationships, often with her dual Danish and Filipino cultural backgrounds as the vantage point. Her first solo exhibition, Family show, was held in 2000 at the Akershus Kunstsenter at Lillestrøm in Norway. Her video piece Absolute Exotic was included in the 2007 traveling exhibition Global Feminisms, organized by the Elizabeth A. Sackler Center for Feminist Art at the Brooklyn Museum. In 2008 she was awarded the Eckersberg Medal. She participated in the 2011 Venice Biennale in the Danish pavilion with Afghan Hound: four songs on video plus a live performance.

In 2018, Rasmussen participated in Art Basel Hong Kong. Also in 2018, Rasmussen created Tow with the Flow after being commissioned by ART 2030 to create a performance with the subject of sustainable consumption. In 2019, Tow with the Flow was included in the Art Palm Beach in Florida.

In 2022 through early 2023, the Helsinki Art Museum exhibited Rasmussen's I am Not What You See.

In 2017, Rasmussen served on the selection committee that chose Kirstine Roepstorff to represent Denmark in 57th Venice Biennale.

== Personal life ==
Lilibeth Cuenca Rasmussen lives in Copenhagen.

== Bibliography ==
- Lilibeth Cuenca Rasmussen, Revolver Publishing by VVV, Berlin 2010, ISBN 978-3-86895-118-9

== Awards ==
- 2008 Eckersberg Medal
