= Clarity Haynes =

American artist and writer (born 1971)

- Born: 1971 (age 54–55)
- Education: Temple University (BA); Pennsylvania Academy of the Fine Arts (CFA); Brooklyn College (MFA)
- Known for: Painting
- Notable work: The Torsos Series
- Awards: Pollock-Krasner Foundation Grant; New York Foundation for the Arts Fellowship; MacDowell Fellowship; Barbara Deming Memorial Fund Grant
- Website: clarityhaynes.com

Clarity Haynes is an American visual artist whose work focuses on representations of the human body, particularly through detailed painted portraits of torsos. She is best known for The Breast Portrait Project, an ongoing series that depicts a wide range of bodies, including those of queer, transgender, cisgender, and nonbinary individuals.

Haynes’s work emphasizes body diversity and challenges conventional ideals of beauty by presenting bodies in a direct and non-idealized manner. She lives and works in New York City.

== Education ==
Haynes holds a BA in Film from Temple University, a CFA in Painting from the Pennsylvania Academy of the Fine Arts, and an MFA in Painting from Brooklyn College. Her background in both film and painting has informed her approach to portraiture, particularly her focus on composition and the body as a subject.

== Work ==
Haynes' paintings of bodies have been described as "an antidote to shame" by Julia Halperin of The New York Times. Her most well-known body of work is The Breast Portrait Project, an ongoing series of paintings depicting nude torsos with visible features such as wrinkles, scars, and stretch marks. The absence of a face compels the viewer to detect character and personality from these less-familiar indicators. The project began in the late 1990s with a self-portrait of her own torso and later expanded to include portraits of other subjects. She explains: "I am interested in the many ways the body changes throughout a lifetime, and in the ways in which we create and change our bodies."

In a conversation with artist Loie Hollowell in BOMB Magazine, Haynes mentions a scar that was on the belly of one of her models, who suggested that the scar be omitted from the portrait. After a discussion with the model, the scar, which was in the shape of a flower, was ultimately included in the painting, and the work became one of Haynes' favorites. Her work has been described as exploring representations of the body that challenge social norms surrounding visibility and taboo. Haynes keeps records and pictures of each sitter in handmade books for the project full of the people she painted to help heal just like she had.

One of Haynes' best known torso paintings is the 2019 portrait of the body-centric artist Genesis Breyer P-Orridge, who Haynes met through their mutual gallerist, Benjamin Tischer. Haynes has described this portrait as a turning point in her practice. Footage of P-Orridge sitting for Haynes is included in S/He Is Still Her/E - The Official Genesis P-Orridge Documentary.

A New Yorker review by Johanna Fateman states, "Haynes explores the possibilities of feminist figuration in cropped compositions whose subjects are frankly depicted, in frontal poses, with their scars, stretch marks, and sagging flesh. Their tattoos and jewelry assume a talismanic significance, which continues in a companion series—its genre might be called "queer trompe-l'oeil"—portraying collage like shrines." Within her altars, Haynes honors various queer symbols and ephemera, allowing the viewer to appreciate their evolution over time. This preservation of LGBT history creates a visual archive.

In 2021 Haynes had a solo exhibition, Collective Transmission, at the Aldrich Museum which focused on her altars. Within that exhibition was the painting Birth Altar (2020-21) which led Haynes into a body of work entirely of paintings about births - her Crowning series, which started in 2020. Haynes is interested in fragmenting the body as a strategy for examination. It allows for an examination and disorienting of the body through a queer lens, outside of acceptable social norms.

Haynes' first exhibition of crowning work was at NADA Foreland in 2021. In 2024, her exhibition at New Discretions in New York was focused on the Crowning series.

== Solo exhibitions ==
- Clarity Haynes: Portals, New Discretions, New York City, 2024
- Clarity Haynes: Collective Transmission, Aldrich Projects, The Aldrich Contemporary Art Museum, Ridgefield, Connecticut, 2021
- Clarity Haynes: NADA x Foreland Expanded, presented by New Discretions at Foreland, Catskill, New York, 2021
- Clarity Haynes: Altar-ed Bodies, presented by New Discretions, Denny Dimin Gallery, New York City, 2020
- Clarity Haynes: Baba Na Gig, Kniznick Gallery, Women's Studies Research Center, Waltham, Massachusetts, 2017–2018
- Clarity Haynes: The Breast Portrait Project, Payne Gallery, Moravian College, Bethlehem, Pennsylvania, 2017
- Clarity Haynes: Accession, Stout Projects, Brooklyn, New York, 2016
- Clarity Haynes: Radical Acceptance, Tabla Rasa Gallery, Brooklyn, New York, 2011
- Clarity Haynes: Recent Drawings, Bogigian Gallery, Wilson College, Chambersburg, Pennsylvania, 2008

== Selected group exhibitions ==
- Beyond the Rainbow, The Bunker Art Space, West Palm Beach, Florida, 2026
- The Woman Question: 1550–2025, Museum of Modern Art, Warsaw, Poland, 2026
- A Queer Arcana: Art, Magic, and Spirit, Palm Springs Art Museum, Palm Springs, California, 2026
- Riveting: Women Artists from the Sara M. and Michelle Vance Waddell Collection, Dayton Art Institute, Dayton, Ohio, 2024
- Pictures Girls Make: Portraiture Through a Lens of Progress, curated by Alison Gingeras, Blum & Poe, Los Angeles, California, 2023
- Painters Painting Painters: A Study of Muses, Friends and Companions, Green Family Art Foundation, Dallas, Texas, 2022
- Taking Space: Contemporary Women Artists and the Politics of Scale, Pennsylvania Academy of the Fine Arts, Philadelphia, Pennsylvania, 2021; traveled to Montclair Art Museum, Montclair, New Jersey
- The Outwin: American Portraiture Today, National Portrait Gallery, Smithsonian Institution, Washington, D.C., 2016–2018
- The Art World We Want, Pennsylvania Academy of the Fine Arts, Philadelphia, Pennsylvania, 2018
- Portraits by Clarity Haynes and Cyndy Warwick, Leslie-Lohman Museum of Art, New York City, 2011

== Recognition ==
=== Awards and residencies ===
Haynes has received numerous awards, including a Pollock-Krasner Foundation award, a New York Foundation for the Arts Fellowship in Painting, and a MacDowell Fellowship. She has also received a residency at Yaddo, as well as a Brooklyn Arts Council/New York City Department of Cultural Affairs Community Regrant Award, a Leeway Foundation Window of Opportunity Grant, and a Barbara Deming Memorial Fund Grant.

=== Collections ===
Her work is held in the collections of the Leslie-Lohman Museum of Art, the Pennsylvania Academy of the Fine Arts, the Weatherspoon Art Museum, the Marjorie Barrick Museum of Art, the Woodmere Art Museum, and the Rena Rowan Breast Cancer Center at the University of Pennsylvania Hospital. Her work is also included in the Brooklyn Museum’s Feminist Art Base.

=== Publications and coverage ===
Haynes’s work has been discussed in publications including Artforum, The New Yorker, New York Magazine, the Washington Post, Hyperallergic, Two Coats of Paint, Juxtapoz, Beautiful Decay, and the Huffington Post.

Her work has been included in books such as The Body: Social and Cultural Dissections (Routledge), Living Out Loud: An Introduction to LGBTQ History, Society, and Culture (Routledge), Queer Art: From Canvas to Club, and the Spaces Between by Gemma Rolls-Bentley, and Queer Holdings: A Survey of The Leslie-Lohman Museum Collection. It was also featured in the July 2016 issue of Sinister Wisdom, titled Variations.

The process of sitting for one of her torso portraits is described in Sarah Thornton’s book Tits Up: What Sex Workers, Milk Bankers, Plastic Surgeons, Bra Designers, and Witches Tell Us about Breasts.

=== Monograph ===
In 2024, Haynes’s first monograph was published by New Discretions. The publication includes writing by Leah DeVun, Jeanne Vaccaro, and Harry Dodge, and was featured in Culture Magazine’s The Year in Art Books: Our Critics Pick Their Favorite Titles.

== Censorship ==
Haynes' work is frequently censored on social media. She has written about her experience with censorship, and chaired a panel on the subject at the College Art Association Conference in 2019.

== Writing ==
From 2015 to 2022 Haynes worked as an art writer. Her writing appeared in Hyperallergic, Two Coats of Paint, The Brooklyn Rail, ARTnews, and other publications.

=== Selected writings ===
- Haynes, Clarity. "Going Beneath the Surface: For 50 Years, Harmony Hammond's Art and Activism Has Championed Queer Women." ARTnews, June 2019.
- Haynes, Clarity. "I'm a Queer Feminist Artist. Why Are My Paintings Censored on Social Media?" Hyperallergic, March 2018.
- Haynes, Clarity. "'You Have to Get Past the Fear': Joan Semmel on Painting Her Aging, Nude Body." Hyperallergic, September 2016.
- Haynes, Clarity. "How We Got Here: Portrait of the Artist as a Queer Feminist." Hyperallergic, March 2015.
