= Souvenirs from Earth =

International television channel

- Type: Broadcast television network Livestream via Souvenirsfromearth.tv
- Branding: SFE
- Country: Germany, France, Austria
- Availability: International
- Motto: "There is no Gravity"
- Headquarters: Ellerstrasse, Düsseldorf
- Broadcast area: Worldwide
- Launch date: April 30, 2006 (television)
- Picture format: 1080i (HDTV); 576i (SDTV)
- Callsigns: SFE
- Callsign meaning: Souvenirs From Earth
- Webcast: https://www.souvenirsfromearth.tv/live-tv-pre
- Official website: souvenirsfromearth.tv

Souvenirs from Earth (SFE) is an independent TV station broadcasting a 24/7 program of art films, music, installations, and performances. It is based in Germany and currently can be viewed via French, German, and Austrian cable as well as over the internet through the website's livestream and in certain public locations.

A catalog of over 3000 videos of art, experimental films, contemporary dance videos, avant-garde music videos, and films of photographs are in constant motion within the channel earning it the nickname as "The MTV of Contemporary Art".

== History ==
Close to the ideas of Nam June Paik and Brian Eno, the concept for the channel was first presented at the Institute of Contemporary Arts in 1998 and at the Venice Biennale in 1999 by Marcus Kreiss. In 2006, SFE received the license to broadcast in Germany and the channel officially went on air that year. In 2008, the channel started airing in France via Iliad and in 2014 the channel started broadcasting via Austrian cable through Kabel Austria and A One.

In 2009, SFE acquired a permanent installation at Palais de Tokyo and, in 2010, the channel became a residing fixture in all German airports. In 2011, the SFE was invited by the French Institute to present the channel at the Nam June Paik Center in Seoul, South Korea and while there put a show together to be viewed in Central Station on the largest LED screen in the world.

In 2007, the channel's staff added Alec Crichton, a curator from the Academy of Media Arts Cologne to manage the incoming submissions from international artists for the channel's broadcast. In 2008, SFE released its second DVD of works entitled "Souvenirs of Earth V2", including works by Marcus Kreiss. In 2012, Markus Kienast, a telco engineer, created the livestream and aided the station's programming software and international development while Wolfgang Kabisch, a cultural journalist, became the editor-in-chief of the channel's cultural output in 2013. In 2014, glamour girl Melissa Mourer Ordener joined the team as the official muse. On August 8th 2026, the channel celebrated its 25th anniversary with a special "25 ans de Souvenirs from Earth (25 years of Souvenirs from Earth)" programme block which ran from 10pm to 2am, featuring art new and old.

== Programming ==
SFE has been referred to as "anti-television" or "the MTV of contemporary art". The content is submitted by artists around the world and then curated into constantly changing broadcasts. The channel has no published schedule and is constantly bringing in new content. This approach aims to make each viewing experience unique and unpredictable.

Identifiable slots of sorts (all adhering to France timezone) include the morning "A dry, cool place", which consists of nature based videos (5am - 12am), a daytime mixed block of contemporary dance, contemporary art, performance art, glitch art, and music videos named "Pipe Dreams" (12am- 6pm). In evening there is the similarly mixed content block "Strawberry Fields" (6pm- 9pm). There is notably a late night slot (12pm- 2am) of new art called "Midnight special program Feeding Radiation", usually including an hour of abrasive, extreme art called Hard contemporain. Generally, blocks are typically not published on SFE's site, and the only way to access the names and times of the blocks is to watch the channel itself.

SFE programming is largely non-verbal due to the nature of video art and can be understood no matter what language the viewer speaks. SFE plans for this to appeal to a broader international audience and is the first international art channel thanks to the lack of a language barrier. The online livestream broadcasts the same content around the world so everyone is always watching the same content in real time.

The channel also gives universities the opportunity to have their own broadcast time so students can showcase their own work on the same platform as other renowned artists, such as Tom Sachs, James Turrell, Bill Viola, and Mike Kilo. In these cases, the broadcasts adopt the title "Souvenirs from ________ " (ex. Souvenirs from Mars is the name of the broadcast from The University of Marseille).

A large portion of the broadcast is allotted to externally curated programs, often provided by young, up and coming curators, or to Carte Blanche special formats for artists (Iris Brosch, Tom Sachs...) or institutions (Art Cologne, Centre Georges Pompidou.)

SFE expands the idea of television, giving it opportunities to be viewed both actively and passively as "video paintings" through the integration with public spaces.

=== Advertisements ===
The channel refuses to have advertisements broadcast on the channel in order to maintain the integrity of the art space and viewing experience. Companies looking to have their name on the channel have the option of making an art video that can be seamlessly integrated in to the programs or the station can air an "anti-commercial" in which the station broadcasts a solid color field with the name of the company in it for 30 seconds.

Notable clients who have advertised using the channel include:

- Apple Inc.
- Aesop (cosmetics)
- Spacehair
- Louis Vuitton
- Twins for Peace
- Jeu de Paume
- Centre Georges Pompidou
- Art Cologne

== Distribution ==
SFE distributes its programming continuously:

- In France by Orange S.A. (channel 248), Free (channel 521), and Bouygues (channel 133)
- In Germany by Unitymedia and Kabel BW
- In Austria by Kabel Eins
- Via online streaming at souvenirsfromearth.tv

Venue/Client	Location
Palais de Tokyo	Paris, France
Electric Paris	Paris, France
Ecole des Beaux Arts de Marseille	Marseille, France
Le Petit Bar	Cannes, France
Oui Madame	London, England
Le Méridien Hotels	worldwide
Neuehouse	NY, USA
Bandol Sur Mer	Berlin, Germany
French Institute of Cologne	Cologne, Germany
The Quest	Cologne, Germany
Nam June Paik Center	Seoul, South Korea
Platoon Kunsthalle	Seoul, South Korea
Le Petit Musee	Shanghai, China

== Notable artworks ==
Artwork	Artist	Description	References
Ice	Mike Kilo	A woman eats an ice cream in a village summer outdoor space.	
Sorry Guys	Chantal Michel	A young woman in a blue dress experiences an Alice in Wonderland like problem of scale in a grey room.	
Kindergarten	Marcus Kreiss	A view of a group of people in a white space wearing childlike outfits.	
Escalade	N/A	A woman runs up an outdoor flight of stairs in Montmartre, leaving the camera crew to run after her. Traditionally played every Good Friday on SFE.	
The Shoelace	N/A	An office worker at a bus stop, realises he is the only person in the queue to notice a man who is lying down on the pavement.	
Ground	Daniela Hedman	In a museum, a young man and an older woman pound objects into the ground as a young woman lies on a bed like platform in a dreamlike haze.	
Coexistence	Donna Conlon	Leaves along a gravel path scuttle along, bringing in different leaves with the flags of different countries.	
Cantine	Mike Kilo	A man lip synchs words as a party plays behind him in a kitchen cantine.	
Camping	Marcus Kreiss	A group of campers	
Beach	Marcus Kreiss	A group of people on a beach, shot in bright white light background.	
Skating	Marcus Kreiss	The view of a group of skateboarders.	
L'asenceur (The Lift)	Marcus Kreiss (feat Julie Barranger)	A young woman goes down a lift, wearing different clothes and fashions. Each time the lift appears, she is wearing different clothes.	
Still Life and Death - With vegetables and Chrysalys	Stephane Soulié	Vegetables on a table in a 16th/17th century-style tableau begin to slowly rot.	
Echtzeit (Real time)	Oliver Husain & Michel Klöfkorn (feat Sensorama)	Suits in a factory are pressed and put on clothes rails. Gaining sentience, the clothes decide to take a walk around the city and even catch a subway train.	
Atterrissage de Banche-Neige (Snow White lands)	Catherine Bay	Various women dressed as fairytale character Snow White, train in a forest landscape with guns.	
Iceplanet Dezoom	Jeremie Brunet (feat Lulu Rouge & Fanney Osk)	Icy landscapes including rocks, diggers, mountains and factories are accompanied by the song "Landscape of Love" by Lulu Rouge (feat Fanney Osk).	
Roots	Karina smigla-Bobinski	On a window style surface, a young woman reflects as water droplets of her face appear in subtle CG on the window.	
Swallowable Purfume	Lucy McRae	A young woman stretches out on a table, as she is wrapped in a clingfilm type texture. Meanwhile scientists test purfume samples.	

Non exhaustive list of notable artworks premiered on SFE, and are catalogued on film databases. Does not include extreme art from Hard Contemporain hours. Some artworks are from archives of art institutions worldwide.

== Logo ==
The logo for SFE is inspired by In Search of Lost Time by Marcel Proust. In the book, there is a scene in which Proust recalls sitting in his garden and having a moment of total recall triggered by the taste of the madeleine (cake) he was soaking in his tea. Proust's writing focused on memories and the idea that our memory affects our perception of reality and SFE incorporated this iconic madeline to symbolize the artistic process in which we transform our reality. The basis of the channel is a collective memory of moments which are the created reality of the artist behind the screen. The graphic design of the madeline also recalls the icon for Star Trek and the futuristic concept of "video paintings" which were originally inspired by science fiction set designers.

== See also ==
- List of video artists
- Experimental film
- New media art
- Interactive film
- Video jockey
- VJ (video performance artist)
- Music visualization
- Scratch video
- Visual music
- Real-time computer graphics
- Video poetry
- Video sculpture
- Artmedia
