= Tejal Shah =

Indian visual artist (born 1979)

- तेजल शाह
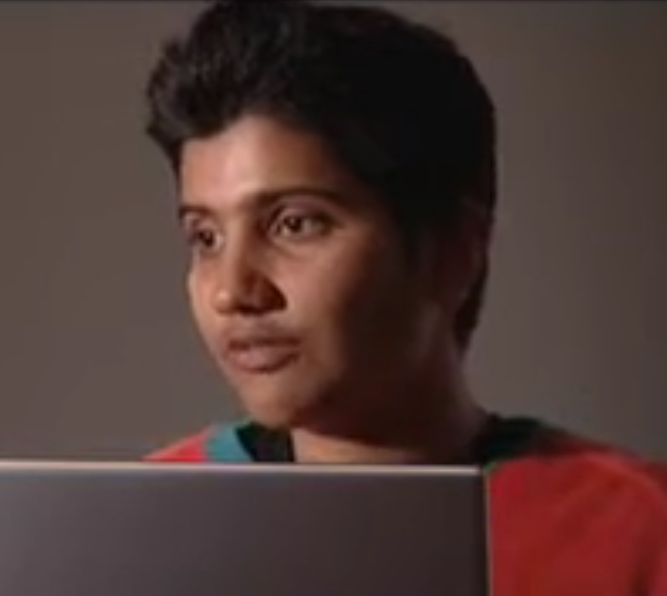
- At the Brooklyn Museum in 2007
- Born: 1979 (age 46–47); Bhilai, Chhattisgarh, India
- Education: RMIT University
- Occupations: Visual artist, curator

Tejal Shah (Hindi: तेजल शाह; born 1979) is an Indian contemporary visual artist and curator. She works within the mediums of video art, photography, performance, drawing, sound work, and spatial installations. Shah explores topics in her work including the LGBTQ+ community, sexuality, gender, disability, and the relationship between humans and nature. She lives in Mumbai.

== Biography ==
Tejal Shah was born in 1979 in Bhilai, Chhattisgarh, India. Shah has identified as queer. She has BA degree (2000) in photography from RMIT University (Royal Melbourne Institute of Technology) in Melbourne, Australia; and worked towards a MFA degree from Bard College but did not graduate. She was an exchange student and attended the School of the Art Institute of Chicago, from 1999 to 2000.

Her 2006 Hijra Fantasy series of work highlighted the Hijra community (eunuchs, intersex people, and/or transgender people) of Bangalore and Mumbai. In 2012, for Documenta (13) in Kassel, she created the five-channel video installation "Between the Waves" featuring two women wearing horns and exploring a surreal landscape.

Shah's artwork has been shown widely, including Global Feminisms (2007) at Brooklyn Museum in Brooklyn, New York; "India: Public Places/Private Spaces" (2008) at Newark Museum in Newark, New Jersey; Documenta (13) (2012) in Kassel, Germany; and "Everyone Is an Artist: Cosmopolitan Exercises With Joseph Beuys" (2021) at K20 in Düsseldorf, Germany. Her work was also part of the group exhibition "Facing India" (2018) at Kunstmuseum Wolfsburg in Wolfsburg, Germany; other artists included Vibha Galhotra, Bharti Kher, Prajakta Potnis, Reena Saini Kallat, and Mithu Sen.

Shah's work is in public museum collections include at the Centre Pompidou.

== See also ==
- List of Indian women artists
