= Elizabeth Insogna =

Elizabeth Insogna is an American artist and writer. She was born in Queens and lives and works in Brooklyn, New York. She creates ceramic sculptures, drawings and ritual performances within the realm of the divine feminine through queer and feminist space as well as occult practices. She has a BFA in sculpture from SUNY New Paltz and an MFA from Brooklyn College. Her work has been included in exhibitions at Five Myles Gallery, The KMAC Museum, Bill Arning Exhibitions, The National Arts Club, Tappeto Volante Gallery and The Abrons Art Center and Anne Reid '72 Gallery at Princeton Day School. Her work has been featured in Artsy, Art Spiel, Magic Praxis, Huffington Post, Abraxas Journal, Hyperallergic, Upstate Art Diary, Two Coats of Paint and The Brooklyn Rail.
