= Sanghee Song =

South Korean artist (born 1970)

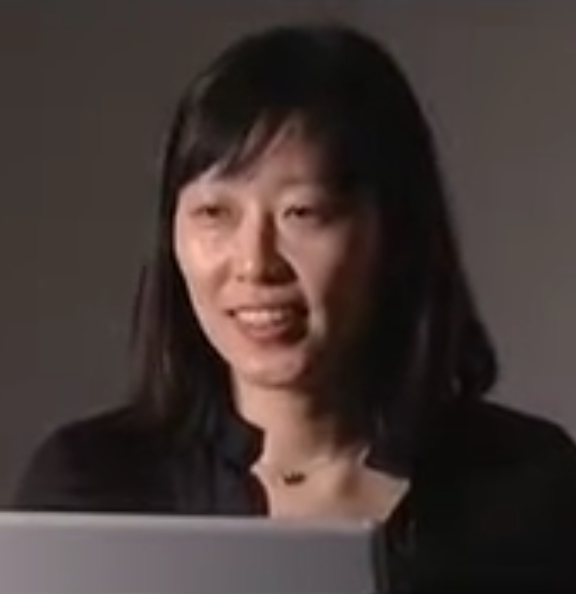
- At the Brooklyn Museum in 2007
- Born: 1970 (age 55–56)
- Education: Ewha Womans University
- Occupation: Artist

Sanghee Song (Korean: 송상희; born 1970) is a South Korean artist. Sanghee Song was born in Seoul in 1970. She attended Ewha Womans University, earning her BFA in painting in 1992 and her MFA in 1994. Her works challenge the myths and repetitive narrativity of virtuous women. For her 2004 video The National Theater, Song reenacted the assassination of Yuk Young-soo, wife of South Korean president Park Chung-hee.

From 2006 to 2007, Song was a resident at the Rijksakademie in Amsterdam. Song won the Hermès Foundation Missulsang, an annual award recognizing emerging Korean artists, in 2008, for her "animation work exploring environmental issues." Song is also the recipient of the 2017 Korea Artist Prize from the National Museum of Modern and Contemporary Art, Korea. Song participated in the 2016 Aichi triennale, the 2004 Busan Biennale, the 2006 Gwangju Biennale, and the 2006 São Paulo Art Biennial. Her work was featured in the 2007 Global Feminisms exhibition at the Brooklyn Museum.

Song has had solo shows at the Seoul Museum of Art in 2021, Gallery ICON, Seoul; Pool, Seoul; FreeSpace PRAHA, Sapporo, Japan; and Insa Art Space, Seoul. Group shows include the Seoul Museum of Art, Hokkaido Museum of Modern Art, Sapporo; Sungkok Art Museum, Seoul; Total Museum of Contemporary Art, Seoul; KunstCentret Silkeborg Bad, Silkeborg, Denmark; Kunsthalle Darmstadt, Germany; and Leeum, Samsung Museum of Art, Seoul.
