= Michaela Gleave =

Australian artist

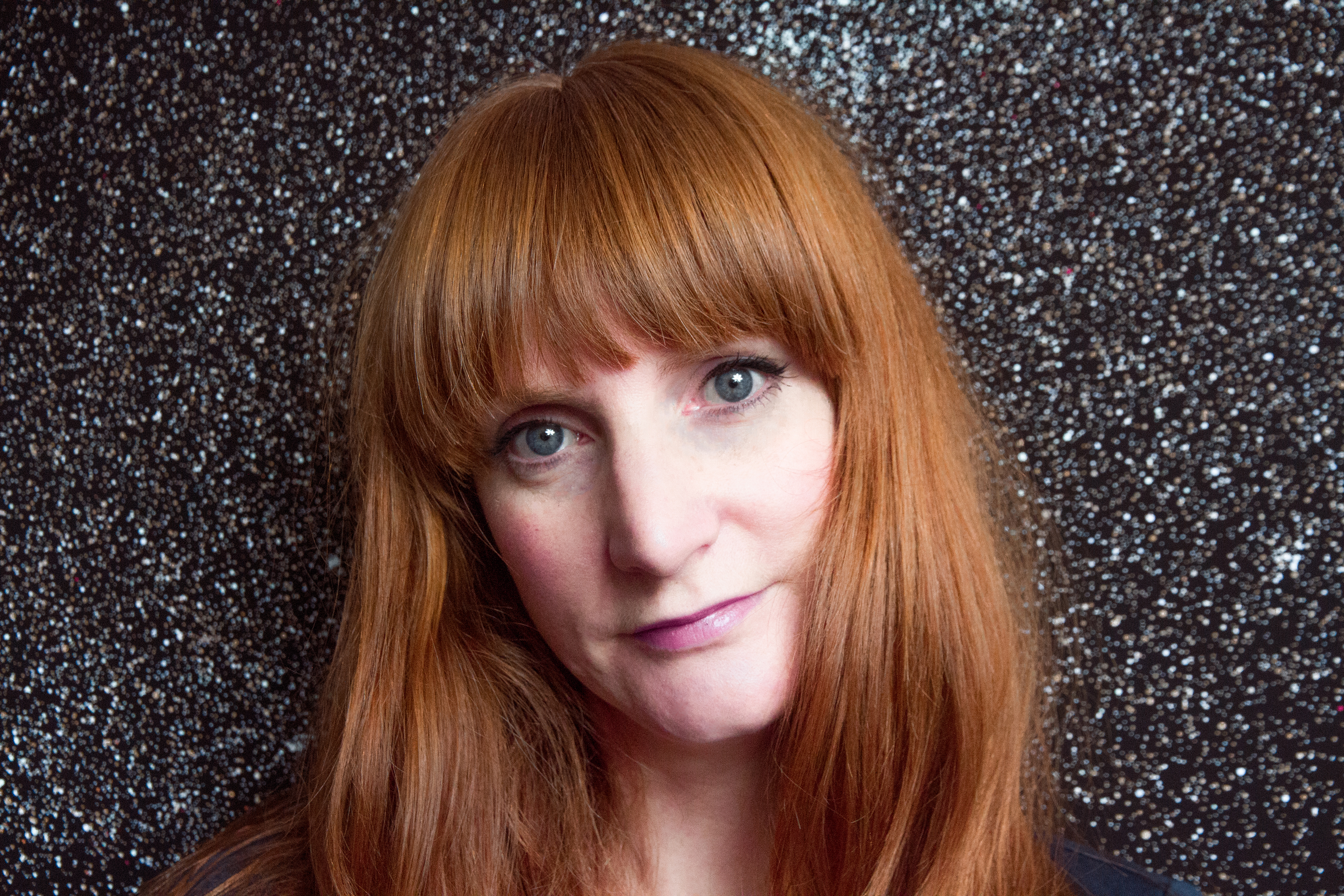
- Born: 1980 (age 45–46)
- Education: University of Tasmania; University of New South Wales
- Style: Conceptual
- Awards: the churchie emerging art prize, 2015
- Website: michaelagleave.com

Michaela Gleave (born 1980) is a Sydney-based Australian conceptual artist best known for her use of light and her monumental site specific art works engaging with space, time and matter. She was a 2012-2013 artist-in-residence at CSIRO Astronomy and Space Science and won a churchie award in 2015.

== Early life and education ==
Gleave was born in Australia in 1980. She obtained a bachelor of fine arts from the University of Tasmania in 2003, and a master of fine arts degree from University of New South Wales in 2007.

== Career and style ==
Gleave is a Sydney-based artist whose practice is rooted within the history and context of installation and runs across numerous mediums and platforms such as: digital and online, performance, photography, sculpture, video, music, data visualisation and performance. Gleave investigates main narratives at the intersection of arts, science and society, with a focus on creating immersive experiences that translate the influence of an idea on the physical properties of the world.

She won the churchie emerging art prize in 2015. Her work is featured in the 2022 book, co-authored by Anna Briers, Edward Colless, Naomi Riddle Michaela Gleave: the Influence of an Idea on the Physical Properties of the World

Gleave has developed major performance and installation works shown at the Museum of Contemporary Art Australia, Sydney; Gallery of Modern Arts, Brisbane; Dark Mofo Festival, Hobart; Fremantle Arts Center, Perth; Bristol, Biennal, UK; TarraWarra Museum of Art, Victoria; Carriageworks, Sydney; and Gertrude Contemporary, Melbourne. She has received residency fellowships at the New York City-based International Studio and Curatorial Program, at the Australia-based Commonwealth Scientific and Industrial Research Organization, and at the Tokyo Wonder Site in Japan. She was awarded a fellowship from the Australia Council for the Arts in 2013.

=== Permanent installations ===
Gleave has been commissioned to create several permanent installations including those at The Rechabite, Western Australia; the Bendigo Art Gallery, Victoria; and her light installation, We Are Made of Stardust, constructed from LEDs at the Salamanca Art Center, Tasmania.

== Works ==
In 2013, her light installation A Day is Longer than a Year was featured in the Fremantle Arts Centre. In 2014, she broadcast a seven-hour performance Waiting for Time (7-hour confetti work) that incorporated an automated confetti canon eruption every minute. In 2016, her red neon installation Fear Eats the Soul featured at the entrance of the Dark Mofo festival in Hobart, Tasmania. At the festival the Tasmanian Symphony Orchestra collaborated with Gleave to perform the opening ceremony, A Galaxy of Suns. In 2017, her piece The World Arrives at Night (Star Printer) was featured at the University of Queensland Art Museum's exhibit New Alchemists.

In 2021, Gleave's collaboration with Aileen Sage Architects was shortlisted for the National Gallery of Victoria Architecture Commission competition. The same year, her 2014 piece The World Arrives at Night (Star Printer) was featured at TarraWarra Biennial.

The Vivid Sydney 2022 festival featured Gleave's Endless Love atop of the Circular Quay train station. On November 26, 2022, Gleave created the installation Between Us. The installation, which lasted from 9pm to midnight local time, projected morse code lighting bursts from Footscray Community Arts Centre and The Substation in Newport art gallery. The Between Us installation is scheduled to be repeated at the Perth Festival in 2023.

=== Selected works and projects ===
- 2008: Mobile Democratic Communication Device
- 2009: Raining Room(Seeing Stars); Snow Field
- 2010: I Would Bring You the Stars; Seven Hour Balloon Work; Persistent Optimism
- 2011: I Would Bring You the Stars(101 Nights); We Are Made of Stardust; Sincerity; It Was Never Meant to Last[Big Time Love]
- 2012: Our Frozen Moment; Model for the End of the Univers 1–4; Event-based score: Lambda Print on Photographic Rag Paper
- 2013: A Day is Longer than a Year; It Matters
- 2014: Waiting for Time
- 2015: Eclipse Machine(Magenta, Orange); Eclipse Machine(Retrograde Motion); Cloud Field
- 2016: A Galaxy of Suns; A Galaxy of Suns[Performance]; Cloud Spa; It Matters; Eclipse Machine[Planetary Motion]; We Are Made of Stardust; Fear Eats the Soul
- 2017: Under One Sun; Irreversible Actions
- 2018: Irreversible Actions; A Galaxy of Suns[Spectra]
- 2019: The Radius of Infinity; We Are Made of Stardust; A Galaxy of Suns
- 2020: Messages of Hope, Messages of Love
- 2021: Cosmic Time; Cooks River 760 – 860 nm
- 2022: Endless Love at Vivid Sydney
- 2022: Between Us
