= The churchie emerging art prize =

Australian art prize

the churchie emerging art prize, formerly the churchie national emerging art prize and also known informally as the churchie, is a national Australian non-acquisitive art award and art exhibition, established in 1987.

== History ==
The award was established in 1987 as an initiative of the Anglican Church Grammar School in Brisbane (known as "Churchie").

Brand + Slater Architects became the major prize sponsors from around 1998.

From 2010, the finalists were exhibited in the Griffith University Art Gallery (GUAG) at the Queensland College of Art in Brisbane. Its name was at that time "the churchie national emerging art prize". GUAG established a partnership with the school, and staff members from the school sat on the Emerging Art Committee as well as developing educational materials to complement the exhibition, aimed at school-age students.

Since 2019 and as of 2022, the Institute of Modern Art in Brisbane has hosted the awards.

== Description ==
Its aim is to help develop the careers of emerging artists. This term refers to artists who already have a body of work and some profile as an artist, but "not yet fully established in their artistic career".

All finalists' work is displayed at the gallery in a curated exhibition. As of 2022 it has a prize pool of A$25,000, with the major prize of A$15,000 sponsored by BSPN Architecture. There is also a People's Choice Award of (A$5,000), decided by visitors to the exhibition of the work of all finalists at the end of the exhibition run.

All work in the exhibition is available for sale.

== Past events and winners ==
- 2012: Guest judge Maura Reily
  - Major Prize Winner – Heath Franco
  - Highly Commended – Agatha Gothe-Snape
  - Highly commended – Sam Cranstoun
  - Highly commended – Genevieve Kemarr Loy
- 2013: Guest judge Roslyn Oxley; Peter McKay, Curator of QAGOMA, was on the finalists committee. Only 32 finalists were selected and included in the exhibition at GUAG, which was the smallest ever number until then.
  - Major prize – Amy Tam (a.k.a. Liberté Grace), for her video The Perfect Boy Myth (version 1)
  - commended – Becc Orszag, for three drawings
  - commended – Annika Koops, for her photograph Sissy
- 2014: Guest judge Alexie Glass-Kantor, Executive Director of ARTSPACE Visual Arts Centre in Sydney; 42 finalists
- 2015: Michaela Gleave
- 2016:
  - Major Prize: Sara Morawetz
  - Special Commendation: Lisa Sammut & David Greenhalgh
  - Guest judge Kelly Gellatly, Director of the Ian Potter Museum of Art at the University of Melbourne
- 2017:
  - Major Prize: Pierre Mukeba
  - Special Commendation: Hayley Millar-Baker
- 2018:
  - Major Prize: Caroline Gasteen
  - Special Commendation: Jimmy Nuttall
- 2019:
  - Major Prize: Nadia Hernández
  - Special Commendation - Ben Soedradjit
- 2020:
  - Major Prize - Emily Parsons-Lord
  - Special Commendation - Nabliah Nordin
- 2021: Guest judge Rhana Devenport ONZM, Director of the Art Gallery of South Australia; exhibition curated by Grace Herbert.
  - Major prize (A$15,000) – Nina Sanadze, Georgian-born artist now living in Melbourne, for Apotheosis, s sculptural work
  - Special Commendation Prize (A$5,000) – Kyra Mancktelow, based in Brisbane
  - Commendation (A$1,000) – Riana Head-Toussaint, based in Sydney
  - Commendation (A$1,000) – Visaya Hoffie, based in Brisbane
- 2022:
  - Major Prize Winner - Emmaline Zanelli for Dynamic Drills
  - Special Commendation - Emma Buswell, for There's nothing unlawful about going for a run and eating a kebab
- 2023:
  - Major prize - Joel Sherwood Spring, for Diggermode
  - Special Commendation - Debbie Taylor Worley, for Earth and Water, Let There Be Trees'
