= Makoto Aida =

Japanese artist (born 1965)

- 会田 誠
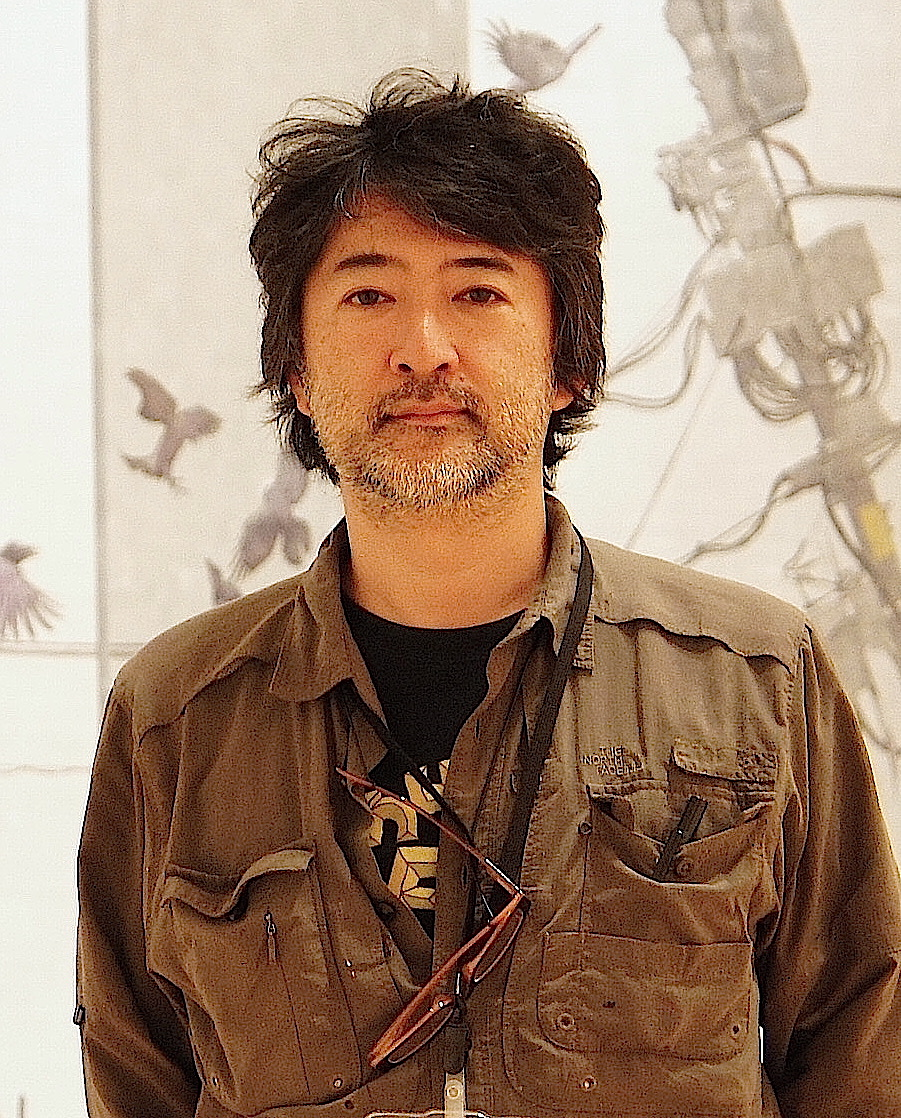
- Makoto Aida at Mori Art Museum, Tokyo, 2012
- Born: Makoto Aida; October 4, 1965 (age 61); Niigata Prefecture, Japan
- Movement: Conceptual art, contemporary art
- Spouse: Hiroko Okada
- Children: 1

Makoto Aida (会田 誠, Aida Makoto; born 4 October 1965 -) is a Japanese contemporary artist known for his provocative works of manga, painting, video, photography, sculpture, and installation. Though less well known internationally than Takashi Murakami or Yoshitomo Nara, he is recognized in Japan as one of the preeminent figures of Japanese contemporary art.

== Biography ==
Aida was born on October 4, 1965, in Niigata Prefecture in rural Japan. Since 2001, he has been married to artist Hiroko Okada. Together they have son Torajiro Aida (born 2001), who is a blockchain software engineer. The family formed an art performance group called "Aidake", in which they mocked the traditional family roles of children in a 2015 performance "Recital" at the Museum of Contemporary Art Tokyo.

Four of the members of the modern art collective Chim-Pom had previously worked with Aida.

A retrospective exhibition, "Aida Makoto: Monument For Nothing" was held in 2012 to 2013 at the Mori Art Museum in Tokyo.

== See also ==
- Censorship in Japan
