= Sheba Chhachhi =

Indian artist (born 1958)

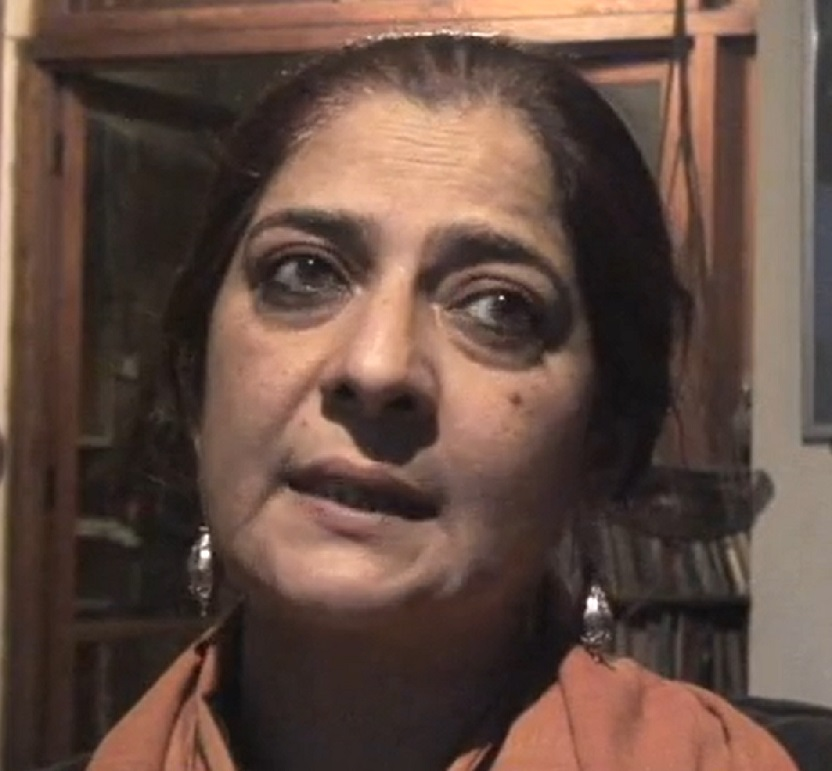
- Chhachhi in 2012
- Born: 1958 (age 67–68); Harar, Ethiopia
- Education: Delhi University, Delhi and National Institute of Design, Ahmedabad
- Known for: Photography and contemporary art
- Awards: Prix Thun for Art and Ethics, Switzerland (2017), Juror’s Prize for contemporary art in Asia by the Singapore Art Museum (2011)

Sheba Chhachhi (born 1958), is an Ethiopian-born Indian photographer, women's rights activist, writer, filmmaker, and installation artist. She is based in New Delhi and has exhibited her works widely in India and internationally.

Issues centring on women and impact of urban transformations informs most of Chhachhi's site-specific installations and independent artworks. Chacchhi has had her work exhibited in 9 solo gallery shows in 18 countries, her work has been sold in 4 auctions. She has also been a part of 5 Special Projects and published in 5 Museum/ Public collections. In 2011, she was awarded the Juror's Prize for Contemporary Art by the Singapore Art Museum and in 2017, she received the prestigious Prix Thun for Art and Ethics.

== Early life and education ==
Chhachhi was born in 1958 in Harar, Ethiopia where her father was stationed by the Indian Army and returned to India at the age of 3 years. The family frequently moved from one place to the other due to her father's job. She recalls of her teen years, "I spent some of my teen years hanging out with folksingers and mystics," before getting involved with the feminist movement. She was educated at Delhi University after which she attended Chitrabani, Kolkata and the National Institute of Design (NID), Ahmedabad.

== Major works ==
Chhachhi started her career in the 1980s with documentary photography, chronicling the women's movement in India. Chhachhi recorded the mass protests in Delhi in the same time period.

Her first international exhibition was titled, Four Women Photographers that opened at Horizon Gallery, London in 1988 as a part of the Spectrum Photography Festival. Seven Lives in a Dream (1998) was the first of a series of close collaborations with the subjects of her art. In an interview with ArtAsiaPacific in 2011 she says, ”It shifted my mode of practice, this inter-subjectivity where the subject and photographer create together. In a way, that was my movement towards ‘art.’ ”

She further reinvented her mode of art practice by moving on to photo based installations making use of photographs, text, sculpture, found objects which she calls, "the perfect form because it brought photography, text, and sculpture together". These multimedia installations explores the questions of history, the feminine experience, visual culture, urban ecologies, personal and collective memory, and retrieves marginal worlds: of women, mendicants, and forgotten forms of labour and the play between the mythic and social. Chhachhi creates immersive environments, bringing the contemplative into the political in both site-specific public art and independent works.

Her photo installation, 'When the Gun Is Raised, Dialogue Stops', a collaborative effort with writer Sonia Jabbar attempts to create a "third space" in which the voice of women of Kashmir can be heard over the violence that plagues the region. It opened as a solo exhibition in India Habitat center, New Delhi in 2000. Chhachhi and Sonia Jabbar made numerous visits to Kashmir and the refugee camps to "bring the human back into the discourse" that is otherwise blurred out in the violence. In 2004, Chhachhi came up with a series of portraits of women ascetics in India. Titled 'Ganga's Daughters: Meetings With Women Ascetics, 1992-2004' it was exhibited in Nature Morte, New Delhi. She spent more than a decade in getting to know these women sadhus and documenting their lives. She was fascinated with the poetry of women ascetics dating back to ancient and medieval India and was introduced to a world in which these women broke free of codified confines of the social order. And thus, she closely followed the women ascetics of North and East India and the result was 'Ganga's Daughters'. She explains, "They are not wives, they are not mothers, they are not daughters. They reinvent themselves as individual beings…. The self-definition is in relation to the metaphysical, and not the social." Her work, 'Winged Pilgrims: A Chronicle' was hosted by Bose Pacia gallery, New York City in 2007. A multi-part installation including sculptures, lightboxes, and a recorded soundtrack that present various iconographies like birds, landscapes, and robed figures articulates the language of migration and a response to globalization. With a series of imaginary landscapes and digital props interspersed with references from Indian sculpture, Persian/ Mughal miniature, Chinese brush painting and documentary photography shown through a moving image light box, the work went on to be exhibited in many other galleries elsewhere." The moving image light box (which she uses in her later works as well), that Chhachhi developed as a new artistic medium, uses a series of still and moving layers of photographic images to almost cinematic effect. She expounds on the work, "This work configures a spatial, temporal and conceptual field within which the movement of ideas, objects, forms across Asia - with China and India as significant nodes - is articulated through three key elements that are simultaneously material and metaphoric: Birds, the robes of Buddhist Pilgrims and the 'Plasma Action' Electronic T.V. toy."

Her investigations with globalisation and its effects on urban transformations continued further with video installation 'The Water Diviner' (2008) hosted by Volte, New Delhi and the installation 'Black Waters Will Burn' (2011). She regards the former as her favorite work till date. She describes that in the sacred text of 'Yamunashtak hymn', Yamuna River is described as a beautiful, sensual woman. But in actuality, Chhachhi perceives it as a wounded female form.

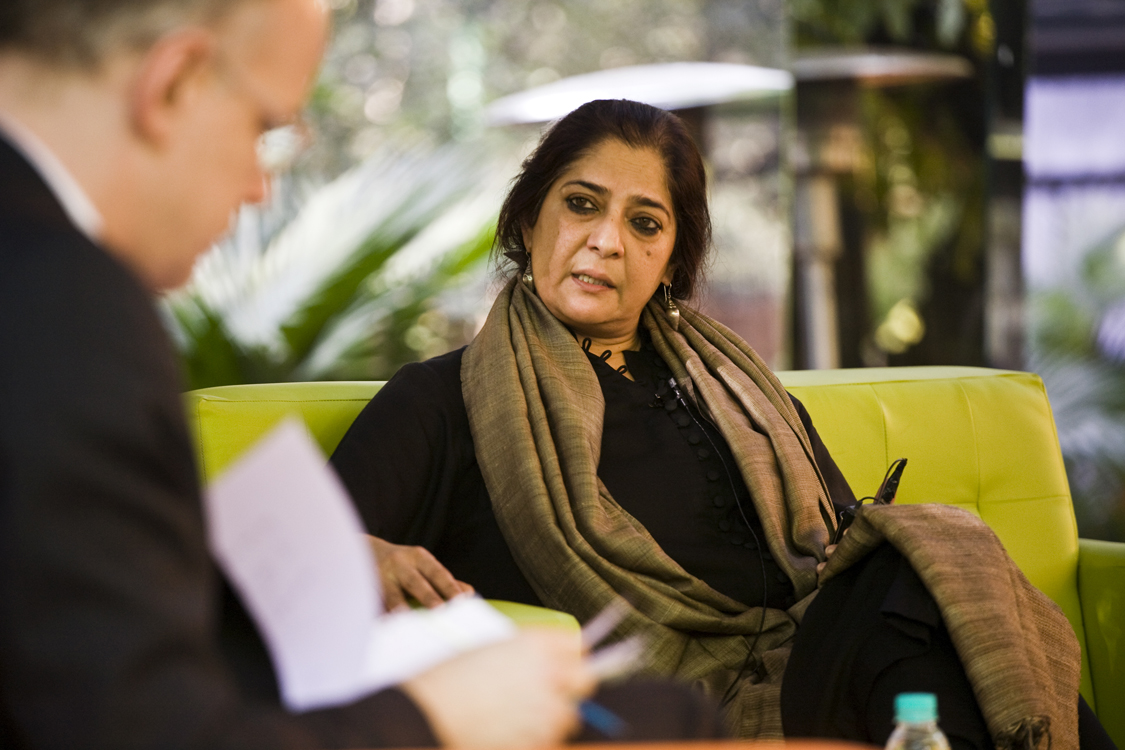
Sheba Chhachhi during the Hans Ulrich Obrist Khoj Marathon, 2011.

Chhachhi was also a part of the 1998 documentary, 'Three Women and a Camera' directed by Sabina Gadhioke, about three women photographers in India, Sheba Chhachhi, Dayanita Singh and Homai Vyarawalla. She also acted in Sonali Fernando's 1992 short film, 'Shakti' as a creative woman who recycles rubbish around her into works of art.

Chhachhi's work encompasses documentary photography, installation, video, and new media, creating immersive environments and bringing the contemplative into the political in both site-specific public art and independent works. Her works are held in significant public and private collections, including the Tate Modern, London; Kiran Nadar Museum, Delhi; Bose Pacia, New York; the Singapore Art Museum; and National Gallery of Modern Art, New Delhi.

== Recent exhibitions ==
Chhachhi's recent solo exhibitions include Agua de Luz, Volte Gallery, Mumbai (2016); Evoking the Pause, Dr. Bhau Daji Lad Museum, Mumbai (2011); and Luminarium, Volte Gallery Mumbai (2011).

- Her group shows include Part Narratives, Bikaner House, New Delhi, and Dr. Bhau Daji Lad Museum (2017)
- 50:50: Photography to Digital Imaging and Back, Birla Academy of Art and Culture, Kolkata (2017)
- Seven Lives & A Dream: Citizen, Tate Modern, London (2016–17)
- Precariously Yours, National Museum of World Cultures, Museum of Ethnology, Leiden, the Netherlands (2016)
- The Eye and the Mind: New Interventions in Contemporary Art, Guangdong Museum of Art, Guangzhou, China Art Museum, Shanghai, Minsheng Art Museum, Beijing, and National Gallery of Modern Art, New Delhi (2015)
- Locust Time, Chandigarh Museum of Art (2014); Water, Europalia Festival, Grand Curtis Museum, Liege, Belgium (2013)
- Everywhere But Now, 4th Thessaloniki Biennale, Macedonian Museum of Contemporary Art, Thessaloniki, Greece (2013)
- Record/Resist: Zones of Contact, Kiran Nadar Museum, Noida, India (2013)
- The Water Diviner: Difficult Loves, Kiran Nadar Museum, Saket, New Delhi (2013)
- Chimera: The Collectors’ Show, Singapore Art Museum (2012).
