= Women Artists: 1550–1950 =

Art exhibition in Los Angeles, 1976

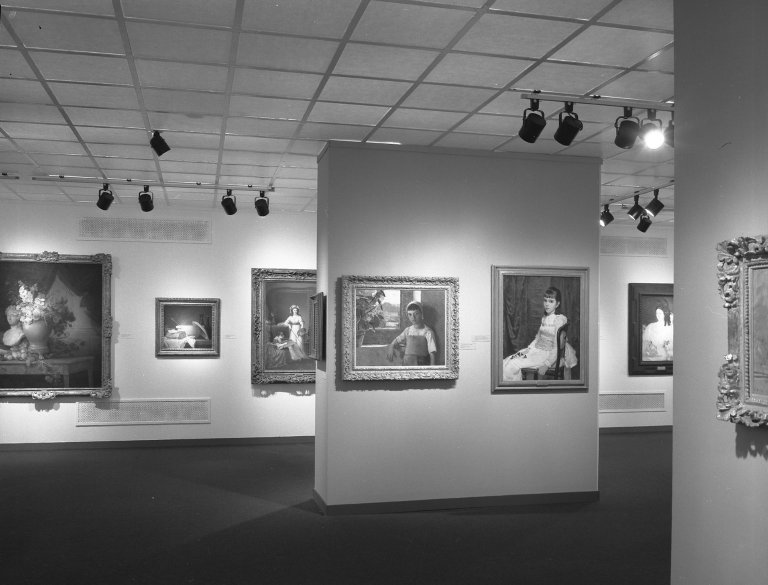
- The exhibition Women Artists: 1550–1950 at the Brooklyn Museum, New York (October 1 to November 27, 1977)
- Date: December 21, 1976 to November 27, 1977
- Location: Los Angeles County Museum of Art, Los Angeles, California; University Art Museum, Austin, Texas; Carnegie Museum of Art, Pittsburgh, Pennsylvania; Brooklyn Museum, Brooklyn, New York
- Outcome: The first international art exhibition made up entirely of art created by professional female artists.

Women Artists: 1550–1950 was the first international exhibition of art in the United States by female artists. The exhibition opened on December 21, 1976, at a time when the Feminist Art Movement was gaining in support and momentum. The show was curated by Professors Ann Sutherland Harris and Linda Nochlin and included eighty-three artists from twelve countries. The four-city exhibition was organized by the Los Angeles County Museum of Art and was on view there from December 21, 1976 through March 1977. The exhibition went on to show at the University Art Museum in Austin, Texas and then to the Carnegie Museum of Art in Pittsburgh, Pennsylvania, after which it completed its run at the Brooklyn Museum in New York. The Alcoa Foundation and the National Endowment for the Arts provided grants for the exhibition. The show became an important event in the history of art, introducing viewers, who were accustomed to a history of art dominated by men, to the important contributions of women artists. However, the show consisted almost entirely of white female artists. The show included only one artist of color, Frida Kahlo, and no black artists.

== List of artists ==
Below is an incomplete list of artists in the show.

- Sofonisba Anguissola
- Pauline Auzou
- Fede Galizia
- Vanessa Bell
- Rosa Bonheur
- Romaine Brooks
- Elizabeth Thompson
- Rosalba Carriera
- Mary Cassatt
- Sonia Delaunay
- Alexandra Exter
- Lavinia Fontana
- Artemisia Gentileschi
- Natalia Goncharova
- Gwen John
- Angelica Kauffman
- Käthe Kollwitz
- Lee Krasner
- Marie Laurencin
- Jeanne-Philiberte Ledoux
- Marie-Victoire Lemoine
- Judith Leyster
- Loren MacIver
- Louise Moillon
- Berthe Morisot
- Alice Neel
- Georgia O'Keeffe
- Liubov Popova
- Olga Rosanova
- Rachel Ruysch
- Elisabetta Sirani
- Florine Stettheimer
- Nadezhda Udaltsova
- Suzanne Valadon
- Anne Vallayer-Coster
- Catharina van Hemessen
- Élisabeth Vigée-Lebrun

== Gallery ==
The exhibition Women Artists, 1550–1950 at the Brooklyn Museum

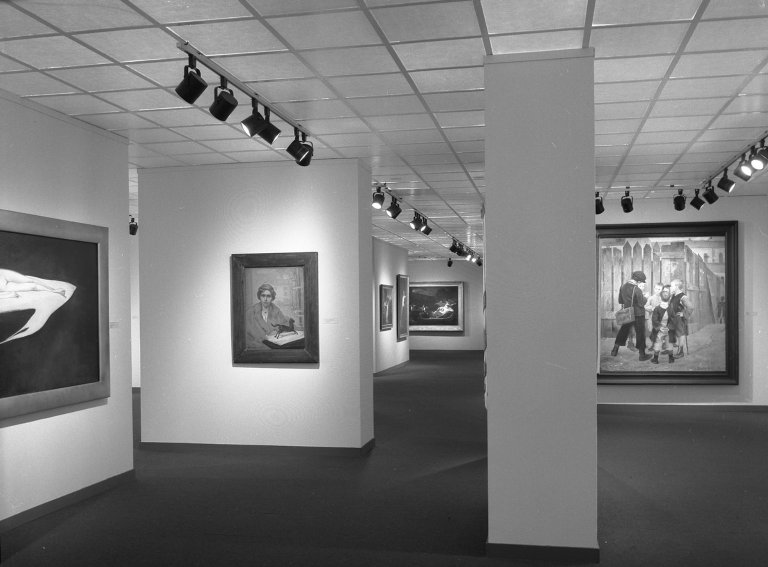

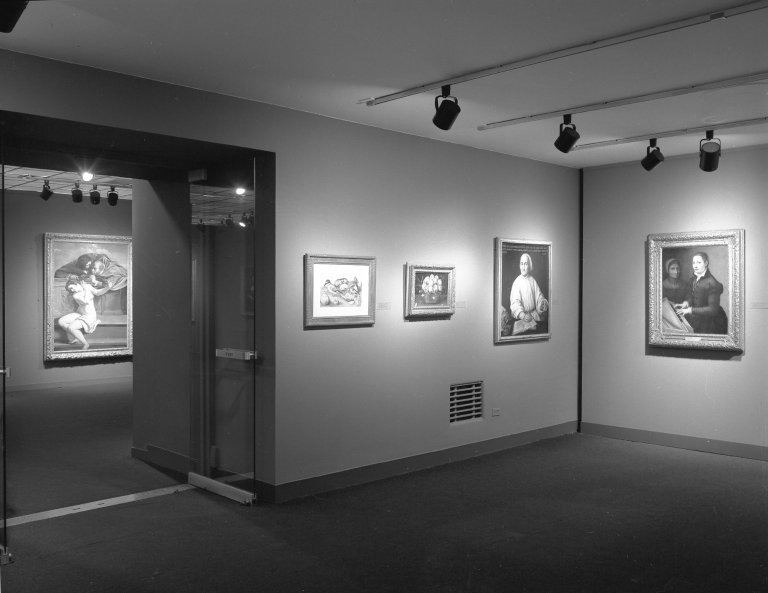

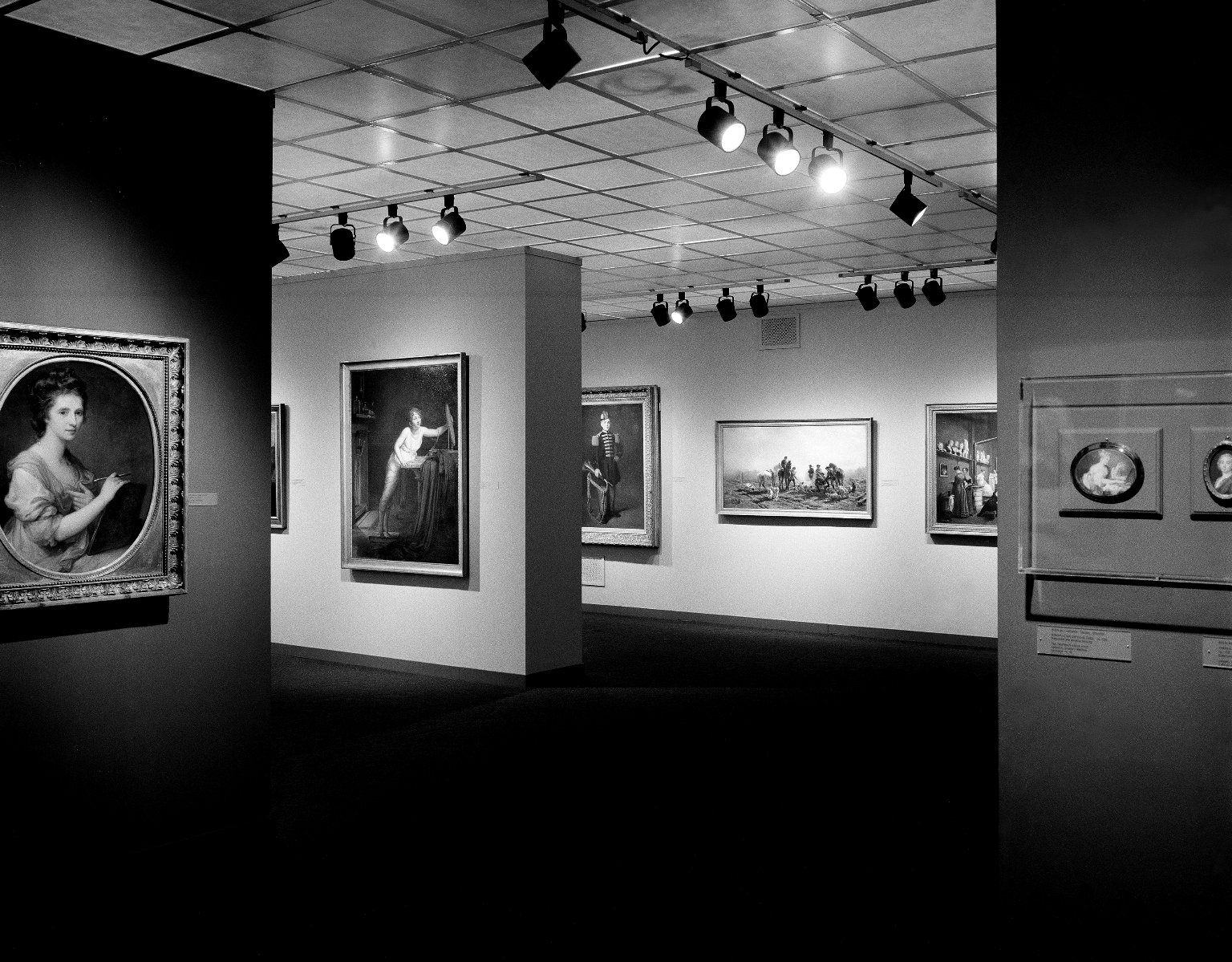

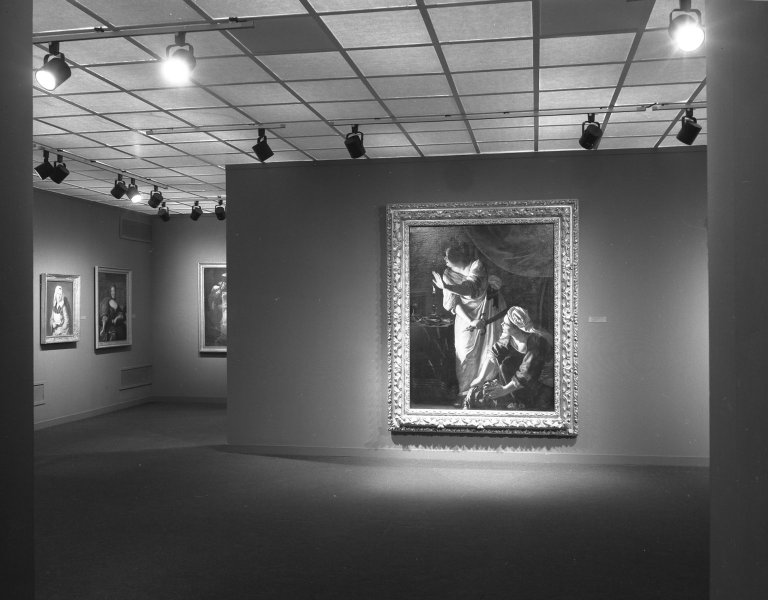
