= FiveMyles Gallery =

Gallery in Brooklyn, New York

Coordinates: 40.672624°N 73.959634°W

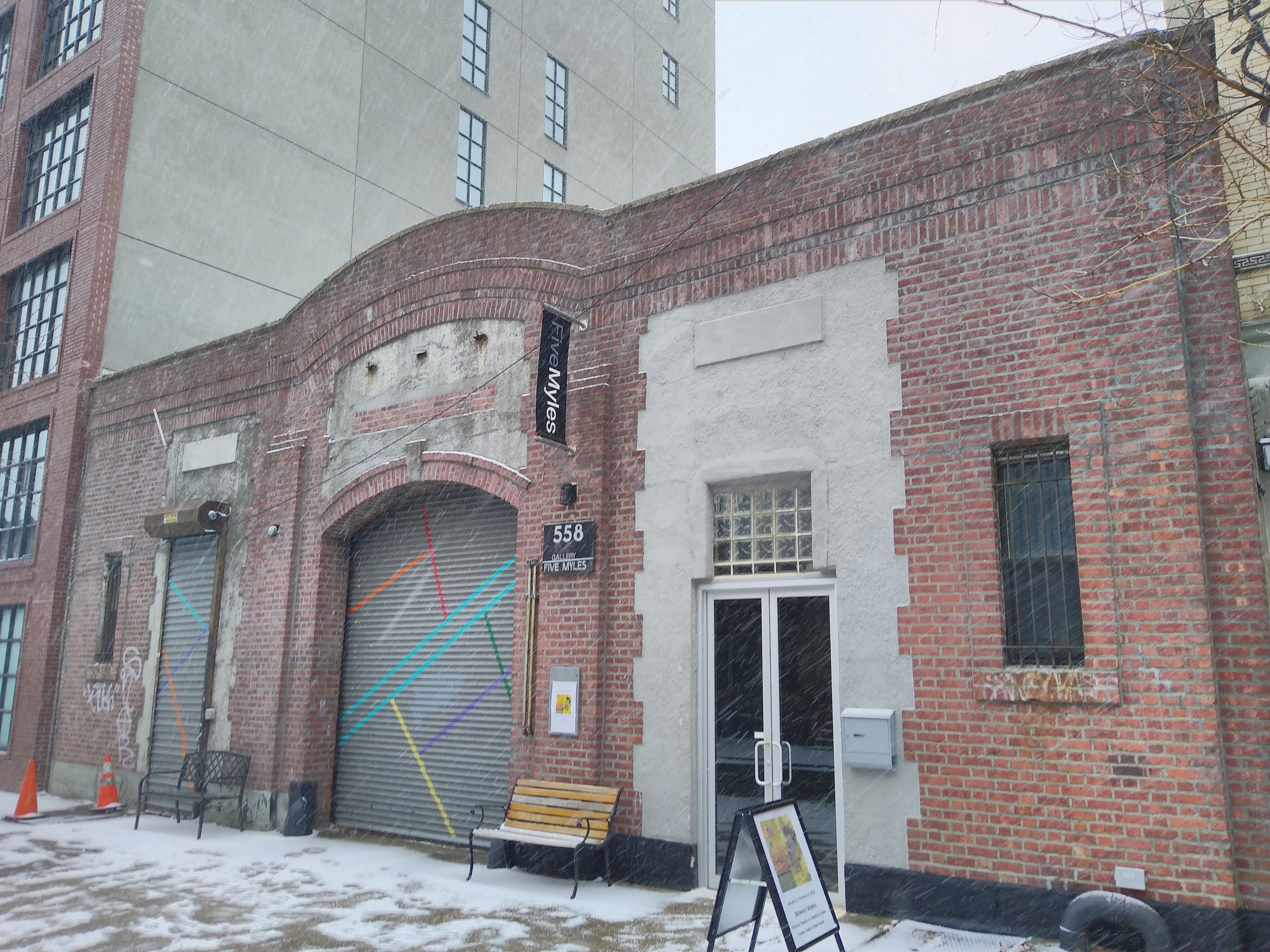
588 St Johns Place, Brooklyn

FiveMyles gallery is located in the Crown Heights area of Brooklyn. Founded in 1999, it is a non-profit gallery that exhibits visual and performance art. Its founder/director is Hanne Tierney. FiveMyles was the location for the Crown Heights Film Festival in 2017, 2018, 2019 and 2021.

== Early years ==
The gallery was founded by Tierney in 1999 as a place to show her work. She had named it after her son, Myles, a filmmaker who was killed while covering the war in Sierra Leone. The first exhibit was a show of African photojournalism.

Operating outside many of the familiar patterns of commercial galleries and artist-run spaces in New York City, the gallery's roster of artists often features lesser-known presenters from within the Crown Heights neighborhood and artists from the African continent and the Caribbean.

In 2000, FiveMyles received an Obie Grant for "presenting magnificent contemporary performance work."

In 2005, programming included, in addition to visual art exhibitions, a performative program attributable to Ms. Tierney's longstanding practice of multi-media theatrical puppetry.
