= Prajakta Potnis =

Prajakta Potnis (born 1980) is an Indian contemporary artist based in Mumbai working in photography, painting, sculpture and installations. Her work explores the connections between intimate and public worlds, and the topographies that influence global politics and economics.

== Early life ==
Potnis was born in 1980 in Mumbai, India. She received her BFA and MFA from J.J School of Art, Mumbai (1995–2002) and a degree in Film Appreciation Course, Film and Television Institute of India (FTTI). She became interested in using the kitchen and domestic appliances in an artistic sense after reading about the Kitchen Debate, where the US President Richard Nixon attempted to show the Soviet Premier Nikita Khrushchev a kitchen affordable by anyone in the US. She explored the history behind the appliances and their impact on post-war society.

== Career ==
Her work is multidisciplinary which includes painting, installation, sculpture and photography. She has exhibited in India and internationally in various museums/institutes including the Ullens Center for Contemporary Art, Beijing, China (2012), Zacheta National Gallery of Art, Warsaw, Poland (2011), Contemporary Art Center, Vilnius, Lithuania (2011), MAXXI National Museum of XXI Century, Rome (2011), Lyon Museum of Contemporary Art, Paris, France (2011), HEART Herning Museum of Contemporary Art, Denmark (2010), Asturp Fearnley Museum of Modern Art, Oslo, Norway (2009), Essl Museum of Contemporary Art, Austria (2010), KHOJ International Artists' Workshop, New Delhi (2009), KHOJ International Artists' Workshop, Mumbai (2009), National Gallery of Art, Mumbai (2002).

=== Solo exhibitions ===
Solo Exhibitions put up by her include "When the wind blows", Project 88, Mumbai (2016), "kitchen debate", Kunstlerhaus Bethanien, Berlin (2014), Time Lapse, The Guild, Mumbai (2012), Local time, Experimenter, Kolkata (2012) Porous Walls, The Guild Art Gallery, Mumbai, 2008; Membranes and Margins, Em Gallery, Seoul (2008); Walls in between, The Guild Art Gallery, Mumbai (2006).

=== Awards ===
Potnis has received major awards for her work which include the Sanskriti Award for Art (2010), the Inlaks Fine Art Award (2003–04), and the Young Artist Fellowship, from the National Department of Culture (2002–03).
