= Maura Reilly =

Curator and writer of art

Academic background
- Education: New York University
- Thesis: Le vice a la mode : Gustave Courbet and the vogue for lesbianism in the Second Empire (2000)
- Doctoral advisor: Linda Nochlin

Maura Reilly is the director of the Zimmerli Art Museum at Rutgers University, and previously served as the founding curator of the Elizabeth A. Sackler Center for Feminist Art. Reilly is also known for developing the concept of 'curatorial activism'.

== Biography ==
Reilly earned a B.A. from Providence College in 1990. She has an M.A. and a Ph.D. from the New York University Institute of Fine Arts where she worked under the supervision of Linda Nochlin. Reilly has held positions at Arizona State University, the American Federation of Arts, as a professor and chair of art theory at the Queensland College of Art at the Griffith University in Brisbane, Australia, Reilly was the founding curator of the Elizabeth A. Sackler Center for Feminist Art at the Brooklyn Museum. She then became the executive director and chief curator of the National Academy of Design. In 2022 Reilly was named director of the Zimmerli Art Museum at Rutgers University.

== Academic work ==
In 2007, Reilly's first exhibition at the Sackler center was Global Feminisms which brought together works from 87 women, and presented the work of women in the context of society at large and not a sole focus on gender. Josephine Withers described the show as placing the exhibit beyond "a priori ideas about what feminist art should look like". Other exhibits that Reilly coordinated at the Sackler include a 2008 show on Ghada Amer.

In 2015, Reilly organized an all-women issue of ARTnews, in which she offered up statistics demonstrating systemic sexism in the art world. Her work on curatorial activism, as expanded upon in her book Curatorial Activism: Towards an Ethics of Curating, is cited by others as a means to teach the need for increased visibility of marginalized artists. Curatorial Activism: Towards an Ethics of Curating was listed as one of the Top 10 Best Art Books of 2018 from the New York Times.

In 2019 she wrote about the lack of representation of women artists in the reinstallation of the permanent collection at the Museum of Modern Art. Exhibits curated by Reilly have been reviewed by arts media across the globe, including, most recently, her exhibition Wandamba yalungka/Winds change direction, which was reviewed in 2021 by The Brooklyn Rail. Reilly and Linda Nochlin co-curated Global Feminisms: New Directions in Contemporary Art, which was the first show at the Brooklyn Museum's Elizabeth A. Sackler Center for Feminist Art; the show was reviewed by the popular press including The New Yorker magazine and the New York Times.

== Selected publications ==
- Global feminisms : new directions in contemporary art. Maura Reilly, Linda Nochlin, Brooklyn Museum, Davis Museum and Cultural Center. London: Merrell Publishers. 2007. ISBN 978-1-85894-390-9. OCLC 79256724.
- Reilly, Maura (2010). Ghada Amer. Ghada Amer. New York: Gregory R. Miller & Co. ISBN 978-0-9800242-0-3. OCLC 549145576.
- Nochlin, Linda (2015). Women artists : the Linda Nochlin reader. Maura Reilly. New York, New York: Thames & Hudson. ISBN 978-0-500-23929-2. OCLC 892891670.
- Reilly, Maura (2015-05-26). "Taking the Measure of Sexism: Facts, Figures, and Fixes". ARTnews.com.
- Reilly, Maura (2018). Curatorial activism : towards an ethics of curating. Lucy R. Lippard. London: WW Norton. ISBN 978-0-500-23970-4. OCLC 992571921.

== Awards ==
In 2005, Reilly won the Future Leadership Award from ArtTable, and in 2006 she received the President Award from the Women's Caucus of Art. Reilly was the guest judge for the 2012 churchie emerging art prize.
