= Linda Nochlin =

American art historian

- Born: Linda Weinberg; January 30, 1931; New York City, United States
- Died: October 29, 2017 (aged 86)
- Occupation: Art historian

Academic background
- Education: Vassar College; Columbia University; New York University

Academic work
- Notable students: Susan Casteras

Linda Nochlin (née Weinberg; January 30, 1931 – October 29, 2017) was an American art historian, Lila Acheson Wallace Professor Emerita of Modern Art at New York University Institute of Fine Arts, and writer. As a prominent feminist art historian, she became well known for her pioneering 1971 article "Why Have There Been No Great Women Artists?" published by ARTnews.

== Early life and education ==
Linda Natalie Weinberg was born to a secular Jewish family, the daughter of Jules Weinberg and Elka Heller (Weinberg) in Brooklyn, New York and raised in the borough's Crown Heights neighborhood. She attended Brooklyn Ethical Cultural School, a progressive grammar school. She received her Bachelor of Arts in philosophy from Vassar College in 1951, her Master of Arts in English from Columbia University in 1952, and her Ph.D. in the history of art from the Institute of Fine Arts at New York University in 1963.

== Academic career ==
After working in the art history departments at Yale University, the Graduate Center of the City University of New York (with Rosalind Krauss), and Vassar College, Nochlin took a position at the Institute of Fine Arts, where she taught until retiring in 2013. In 2000, Self and History: A Tribute to Linda Nochlin was published, an anthology of essays developing themes that Nochlin worked on throughout her career.

Her critical attention was drawn to investigating the ways in which gender affects the creation and apprehension of art, as evidenced by her 1994 essay "Issues of Gender in Cassatt and Eakins". Besides feminist art history, she was best known for her work on Realism, specifically on Gustave Courbet.

Complementing her career as an academic, she served on the Art Advisory Council of the International Foundation for Art Research.

Nochlin was the co-curator of a number of landmark exhibitions exploring the history and achievements of female artists.

- 2007 — "Global Feminisms" at the Brooklyn Museum.
- 1976 — "Women Artists: 1550–1950" (with Ann Sutherland Harris) at the Los Angeles County Museum of Art.

=== Global Feminisms ===
In March 2007, Nochlin co-curated the feminist art exhibition "Global Feminisms" alongside Maura Reilly at the Elizabeth A. Sackler Center for Feminist Art at the Brooklyn Museum, New York City, United States. It was one of the first international exhibitions (see alsoWACK! Art and the Feminist Revolution) that was exclusively dedicated to feminist art, and it featured works from approximately eighty-eight women artists from around the world. The exhibit featured art in all forms of media, such as photography, video, performance, painting and sculpture. The goal of the exhibit was to move beyond the dominating brand of Western feminism, and instead showcase different understandings of feminism and feminist art from a global perspective.

=== Women Artists: 1550–1950 ===
Alongside Global Feminisms, Nochlin also co-curated Women Artists: 1550–1950, the first international art exhibition created solely by female artists on December 21, 1976. It debuted eighty-three artists from 12 countries, and contained roughly 150 European American paintings. In the exhibition catalogue, Ann Sutherland Harris and Linda Nochlin stated "Our intention in assembling these works by European and American women artists active from 1550 to 1950 is to make more widely known the achievements of some fine artists whose neglect can in part be attributed to their sex and to learn more about why and how women artists first emerged as rare exceptions in the sixteenth century and gradually became more numerous until they were a largely accepted part of the cultural scene." As a four-city exhibition, it was originally located at the Los Angeles County Museum of Art in Los Angeles, California, United States. It was then moved and displayed at the Jack S. Blanton Museum of Art at the University of Texas at Austin, Texas. It then continued its journey and was displayed at the Carnegie Museum of Art in Pittsburgh, Pennsylvania, and completed the exhibition at the Brooklyn Museum in New York City, the same place Global Feminisms was displayed.

== Feminist art history ==
In 1971, ARTnews published Nochlin's essay "Why Have There Been No Great Women Artists?", in which she explored assumptions embedded in the title's question. She considered the very nature of art along with the reasons why the notion of artistic genius has been reserved for male geniuses, such as Michelangelo. Nochlin argued that significant societal barriers have prevented women from pursuing art, including restrictions on educating women in art academies and "the entire romantic, elitist, individual-glorifying, and monograph-producing substructure upon which the profession of art history is based ". The thirty-year anniversary of Nochlin's ground-breaking inquiry informed a conference at Princeton University in 2001. The book associated with the conference, Women Artists at the Millennium, includes Nochlin's essay "'Why Have There Been No Great Women Artists?' Thirty Years After". In the conference and in the book, art historians addressed the innovative work of such figures as Louise Bourgeois, Eva Hesse, Francesca Woodman, Carrie Mae Weems, and Mona Hatoum, in the light of the legacies of thirty years of feminist art history.

In her 1994 essay "Starting from Scratch: The Beginnings of Feminist Art History," Nochlin reflected on her awakening as a feminist and its impact on her scholarship and teaching: "In 1969, three major events occurred in my life: I had a baby, I became a feminist, and I organized the first class in Women and Art at Vassar College."

Nochlin deconstructed art history by identifying and questioning methodological presuppositions. She was an advocate for "art historians who investigate the work before their eyes while focusing on its subject matter, informed by a sensitivity to its feminist spirit."

=== Orientalism ===
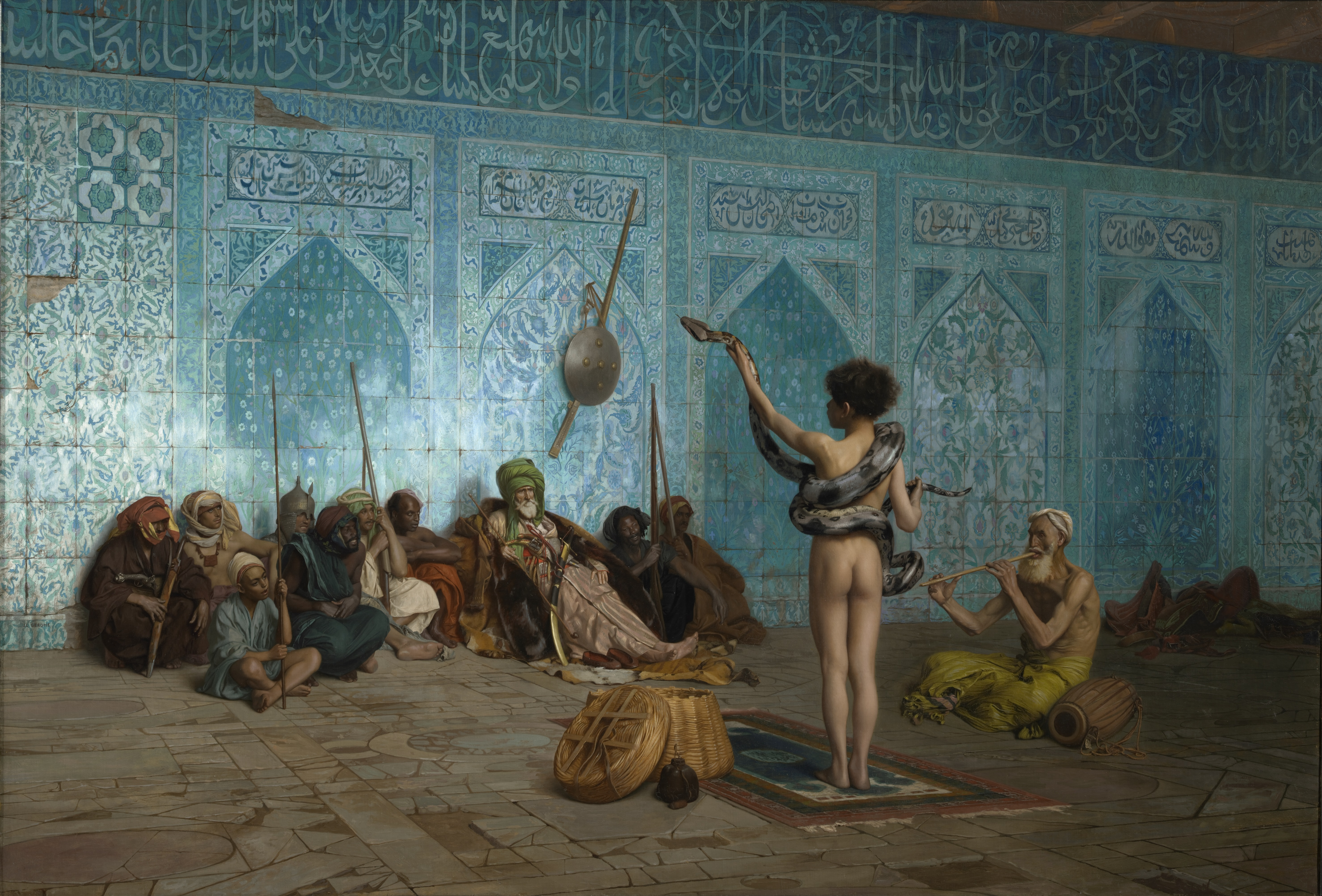
The Snake Charmer

Following Edward Said's influential 1978 book, Orientalism, Nochlin was one of the first art historians to apply theories of Orientalism to the study of art history, specifically in her 1983 paper, "The Imaginary Orient." Her key assertion was that Orientalism must be seen from the point-of-view of 'the particular power structure in which these works came into being," in this case, 19th century French colonialism. Nochlin focused primarily on the 19th century French artists Jean-Leon Gérôme and Eugène Delacroix, who both depicted 'orientalist' themes in their work, including, respectively, The Snake Charmer and The Death of Sardanapalus. In Gérôme's "The Snake Charmer," from the late 1860s, Nochlin described how Gérôme created a sense of verisimilitude not only in his rendering of the scene with such realistic precision one almost forgets a painter painted it, but in capturing the most minute details, such as meticulously painted tiles. As a result, the painting appears to be documentary evidence of life in the Ottoman court while, according to Nochlin, it is in fact a Westerner's vision of a mysterious world. In Delacroix's "The Death of Sardanapalus" from 1827, Nochlin argued that the artist used Orientalism to explore overt erotic and violent themes that may not necessarily reflect France's cultural hegemony but rather the chauvinism and misogyny of early 19th century French society.

=== Representing Women ===
In "Memoirs of an Ad Hoc Art Historian," which is the introduction to Nochlin's book of essays Representing Women, Nochlin examines the representation of women in nineteenth-century art and the ways in which the ad hoc methodology is at play, as she writes, "What I am questioning is the possibility of a single methodology—empirical, theoretical, or both, or neither—which is guaranteed to work in every case, a kind of methodological Vaseline which lubricates an entry into the problem and ensures a smooth, perfect outcome every time" and "[Although] the 'methodology' of these pieces might be described as ad hoc in the extreme, the political nature of this project is far from ad hoc because there is a pre-existing ethical issue at stake which lies at the heart of the undertaking: the issue of women and their representation in art". Here Nochlin is looking at the intersection of the self and history between the middle of the 18th century and the early decades of the 20th, as she analyzes the different ways artists portray women and how these portrayals are representatives of their gender.

=== Lost and Found: Once More the Fallen Woman ===
In March 1978, Nochlin looked at the sexual asymmetry of the word "fallen" and how it is used in regards of gender. For men, it depicts an act of heroism, but for women the term is applied much more negatively and is understood in terms of any sexual activity that is performed out of wedlock. The same differentiation appears in art as well, as fallen in a masculine sense inspired sculptural monuments, versus fallen in a feminine sense struck fascination of nineteenth-century artists. This fascination with the theme of fallen women can be said to have inspired some of the works by Dante Gabriel Rossetti, where he devoted a number of poems and pictorial works to the subject, which resulted in his most notable work: the painting Found.

=== Why Have There Been No Great Women Chefs? ===
Nochlin's essay "Why Have There Been No Great Women Artists?" not only altered the way we view feminist art, but it also affected how we view women's recognition in other fields. Nochlin's work inspired the essay "Why Have There Been No Great Women Chefs?", by Charlotte Druckman, in which the author analyzes the terms cook and chef, and how each one is attributed to an individual based on his or her gender. A cook is often associated with a woman whereas a chef is associated with a man. Druckman argues that "In theory, we've come a long way from the notion that a woman's place is in the domestic kitchen, and that the only kitchen appropriate for a man is the professional one. But in practice, things can be pared down to the following equation: woman : man as cook : chef." By using Nochlin's argument in "Why Have There Been No Great Women Artists?", Druckman follows in her footsteps by arguing, "It becomes clear that we need to ask not why these semantic nuances exist but where they come from, and whether we might be complicit in perpetuating them."

== Personal life ==
Nochlin married twice. First, in 1953 she married Philip H. Nochlin, an assistant professor of philosophy at Vassar, who died seven years later. She then married Richard Pommer, an architectural historian, in 1968. Nochlin had two daughters: Jessica, with Philip Nochlin, and Daisy, with Richard Pommer, who was depicted with Nochlin by the artist Alice Neel in 1973.

Linda Nochlin died at age 86 on October 29, 2017.

== Awards ==
- 1967: Arthur Kingsley Porter Prize for the best article published in The Art Bulletin
- 1978: Frank Jewett Mather Prize for Critical Writing, The College Art Association
- 1977: Woman of the Year, Mademoiselle magazine
- 1984-1985: Guggenheim Fellowship
- 1985: Fellow, Institute for Advanced Study
- 2003: Honorary Doctorate, Harvard University
- 2006: Visionary Woman Award, Moore College of Art & Design
- Fellow, American Academy of Arts and Sciences
- Fellow, New York University's Institute for the Humanities
- Fellow, American Philosophical Society

== Selected publications ==
Nochlin's published writings encompass 156 works in 280 publications in 12 languages and 20,393 library holdings.

- Nochlin, Linda; Reilly, Maura (2015). Women Artists: The Linda Nochlin Reader. New York: Thames & Hudson. ISBN 9780500239292.
- Nochlin, Linda (2007). Courbet. New York: Thames & Hudson. ISBN 978-0500286760.
- Nochlin, Linda (2006). Bathers, Bodies, Beauty: The Visceral Eye. Cambridge, MA: Harvard University Press. ISBN 0674021169.
- Nochlin, Linda. "'Why Have There Been No Great Women Artists?' Thirty Years After." Women Artists at the Millennium,. Carol Armstrong and Catherine de Zegher, eds. Cambridge, Massachusetts: MIT Press, 2006. ISBN 978-0-262-01226-3; OCLC 223446291
- Nochlin, Linda (2001). The Body in Pieces: The Fragment as a Metaphor of Modernity. London: Thames and Hudson. ISBN 0500283052.
- Nochlin, Linda (1999). Representing Women. London: Thames & Hudson. ISBN 0500280983.
- Nochlin, Linda. "Issues of Gender in Cassatt and Eakins." Nineteenth Century Art: A Critical History, 3rd ed. Stephen F. Eisenman, ed. London: Thames & Hudson, 2007. ISBN 978-0-500-28683-8 OCLC 137221626
- Nochlin, Linda (1991). The Politics of Vision: Essays on Nineteenth-Century Art and Society (2nd ed.). New York: Harper & Row. ISBN 0064301877.
- Nochlin, Linda (1988). Women, Art, and Power, and Other Essays. New York: HarperCollins. ISBN 0064301834.
- Nochlin, Linda. "Why Have There Been No Great Women Artists?" ARTnews January 1971, pp. 22–39, 67–71.
- Nochlin, Linda. "Realism." New York: Penguin Books, 1971. Library of Congress 71-149557.
