= Elizabeth A. Sackler Center for Feminist Art =

Floor at the Brooklyn Museum in New York City

Coordinates: 40°40′16.7″N 73°57′49.5″W

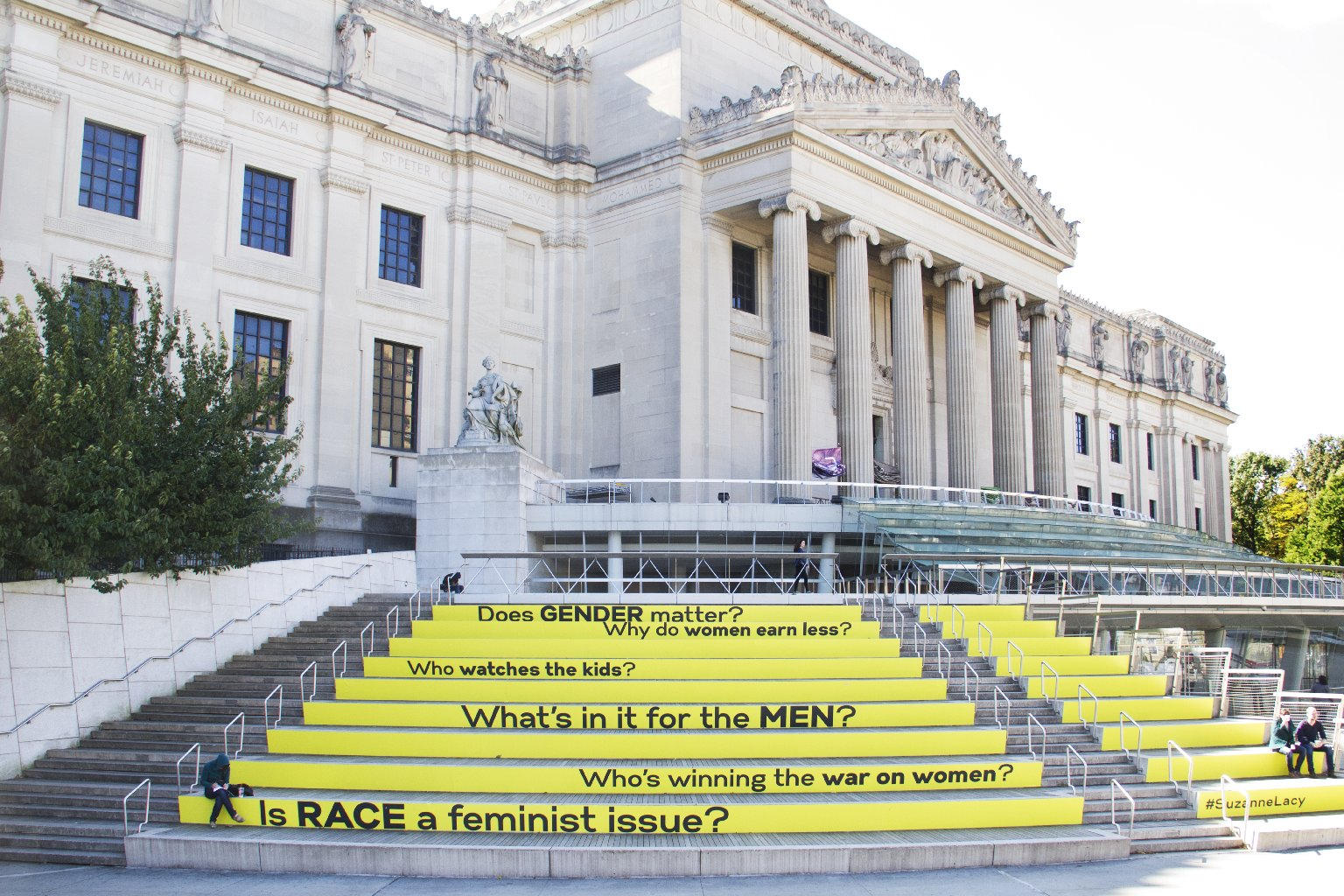
The Elizabeth A. Sackler Center for Feminist Art is located on the fourth floor of the Brooklyn Museum.

The Elizabeth A. Sackler Center for Feminist Art is located on the fourth floor of the Brooklyn Museum, New York City, United States. Since 2007 it has been the home of Judy Chicago's 1979 installation, The Dinner Party. The Center's namesake and founder, Elizabeth A. Sackler, is a philanthropist, art collector, and member of the Sackler family.

== History ==
The Elizabeth A. Sackler Center for Feminist Art opened on March 23, 2007, at the Brooklyn Museum as the first public space of its kind in the country. The 8,300-square-foot (770 m^{2}) center, located on the museum's fourth floor, aims to create a compelling and interactive environment to raise awareness and educate about feminism's impact on culture.

Since 2007 the Center has been the permanent home of Judy Chicago's landmark feminist work The Dinner Party.

The Center's Forum is a venue for public programs and a platform of advocacy for women's issues, and its Feminist Art and Herstory galleries present various exhibitions. The Council for Feminist Art, a membership group, supports the ongoing educational programming and the continuing success of the Center.

== Layout ==
The Dinner Party's gallery is the centerpiece of the Center that was conceived and developed by architect Susan T. Rodriguez, a partner in Ennead Architects. The Dinner Party, which includes 39 place settings as well as the names of 998 women on a Heritage Floor, is enclosed in large, canting glass walls that provide a first glimpse of Chicago's work. It is surrounded by a series of galleries that include two changing exhibition galleries and a study center that can be transformed from an academic forum into a multimedia gallery, as required, by a large pivoting wall.

== Past exhibitions ==
The Center's opening exhibition, "Global Feminisms" was the first international exhibit exclusively dedicated to feminist art from 1990 to the present. It was curated by Maura Reilly and Linda Nochlin.

- "An Art of Our Own: Women Ceramicists from the Permanent Collection", March 23, 2007 – July 26, 2008
- "Artist Project: Between the Door and the Street", October 10–October 20, 2013
- "Burning Down the House: Building a Feminist Art Collection", October 31, 2008 – April 5, 2009
- "Chicago in L.A.: Judy Chicago's Early Work", 1963–74, April 4–September 28, 2014
- "Eva Hesse Spectres 1960", September 16, 2011 – January 8, 2012
- "The Fertile Goddess", December 19, 2008 – May 31, 2009
- "Ghada Amer: Love Has No End", February 16–October 19, 2008
- "Global Feminisms", March 23–July 1, 2007
- "Global Feminisms Remix", August 3, 2007 – February 3, 2008
- "Healing the Wounds of War: The Brooklyn Sanitary Fair of 1864", January 29–October 17, 2010
- "Judy Chicago's Feminist Pedagogy and Alternative Spaces", September 29–November 16, 2014
- " Käthe Kollwitz: Prints from the 'War' and 'Death' Portfolios", March 15–November 10, 2013
- "Kiki Smith: Sojourn", February 12–September 12, 2010
- "Lorna Simpson: Gathered", January 28–August 21, 2011
- "Materializing 'Six Years': Lucy R. Lippard and the Emergence of Conceptual Art, September 14, 2012–February 17, 2013
- "Matthew Buckingham: 'The Spirit and the Letter'", September 3, 2011–January 8, 2012
- "Newspaper Fiction: The New York Journalism of Djuna Barnes, 1913–1919, January 20–August 19, 2012
- "Patricia Cronin: Harriet Hosmer, Lost and Found'", June 5, 2009 – January 24, 2010
- "Pharaohs, Queens, and Goddesses", February 3, 2007 – February 3, 2008
- "Rachel Kneebone: Regarding Rodin", January 27–August 12, 2012
- "Reflections on the Electric Mirror: New Feminist Video", May 1, 2009 – January 10, 2010
- "Sam Taylor-Wood: 'Ghosts'", October 30, 2010 – August 14, 2011
- "Twice Militant: Lorraine Hansberry's Letters to 'The Ladder'", November 22, 2013 – March 16, 2014
- "Seductive Subversion: Women Pop Artists, 1958–1968", October 15, 2010 – January 9, 2011
- "Votes for Women", February 16–November 30, 2008
- "Wangechi Mutu: A Fantastic Journey", October 11, 2013 – March 9, 2014
- "Wish Tree", November 15, 2012 – January 6, 2013
- "'Workt by Hand': Hidden Labor and Historical Quilts", March 15–September 15, 2013
- "Beverly Buchanan—Ruins and Rituals", October 21, 2016 – March 5, 2017
- "Marilyn Minter: Pretty/Dirty", November 4, 2016 – May 7, 2017
- "Iggy Pop Life Class by Jeremy Deller", November 4, 2016 – June 18, 2017
- "Infinite Blue", Opened November 25, 2016
- "A Woman's Afterlife: Gender Transformation in Ancient Egypt", Opened December 15, 2016
- "Georgia O'Keeffe: Living Modern", March 3–July 23, 2017
- "We Wanted a Revolution: Black Radical Women", 1965–85, April 21–September 17, 2017
- "Roots of 'The Dinner Party': History in the Making", October 20, 2017 - March 4, 2018
- "Radical Women: Latin American Art, 1960–1985", April 13–July 22, 2018

== Feminist Art Base ==
An original initiative from the Center for Feminist Art is its "Feminist Art Base, conceptualized by the Center's founding curator, Maura Reilly." This database is a self-generated selection of past and present artists, whose work reflect feminist ideas, investments, and concerns, such as Karen Heagle, Julia Kunin and Clarity Haynes. The database is actively added to with artists from the around the world, who continue to build their profiles. Each profile includes short biographies, CVs, and exemplary works as well as a "Feminist Art Statement".

== First Awards ==
In March 2012, the Center celebrated its fifth anniversary by honoring fifteen contemporary women with the Sackler Center First Awards. The awards, conceived by Sackler, are given each year to women who have broken a gender barrier to make a remarkable achievement and contribution in her respective field. The honorees are:

2016:

- Angela Davis

2015:

- Miss Piggy

2014:

- Anita Hill

2013:

- Julie Taymor

2012:

- Associate Justice Sandra Day O'Connor (retired)
- Marin Alsop
- Connie Chung
- Johnnetta B. Cole
- Wilhelmina Cole Holladay
- Sandy Lerner
- Lucy R. Lippard
- Chief Wilma Mankiller (posthumous)
- Toni Morrison
- Linda Nochlin
- Jessye Norman
- Judith Rodin
- Muriel Siebert
- Susan Stroman
- Faye Wattleton
