= Pelican History of Art =

Art history handbook series published by Penguin Books and Yale University Press

- Edited by: Nikolaus Pevsner, Peter Lasko, Judy Nairn
- Country: United Kingdom
- Language: English
- Discipline: Art history
- Publisher: Penguin, Yale University Press
- Published: 1953–ca. 2015
- Media type: Print (hardcover & paperback)
- No. of books: 48

The Pelican History of Art was a series of handbooks in art history, published first by Penguin Books under its Pelican Books imprint, and then republished (with new additions) by Yale University Press as the Yale University Press Pelican History of Art from 1993 until the mid-2010s. The founding editor was Nikolaus Pevsner, followed by Peter Lasko; no successor to Lasko has been named.

The series was widely hailed for the depth of its contributions and the eminence of its contributors, even as it has been criticized for its Eurocentrism and formalist approach. E.H. Gombrich, reviewing the first two volumes and the series plan, called it “a thrilling succession of important monographs by some of the greatest authorities in the field”.

== History ==
Allen Lane approached Nikolaus Pevsner in 1945 for a series of illustrated books that would match the success of the King Penguins. Pevsner recalled his response: "Allen said, 'You have done the King Penguins now and we are going on with them, but if you had your way, what else would you do?' I had my answer ready—and the answer was very formidable, because I outlined both The Pelican History of Art and The Buildings of England on the spot, each about 40 to 50 volumes. Allen said, 'Yes, we can do both,' and that was the end of the meeting." Pevsner's industry quickly bore fruit with the first contracts signed by 1946 for John Summerson's Architecture in Britain, Anthony Blunt's Art and Architecture in France, and Rudolf Wittkower's Italian art and architecture, the first title Painting in Britain, 1530–1790 by Ellis Waterhouse was issued in 1953. By 1955, Pevsner produced a prospectus for the series announcing the publication of four new volumes and a plan for the rest of the series totalling 47 titles. The ambition of the series exceeded previously published multi-volume histories of art such as André Michel's Histoire de l'art (17 vols., 1905–28), the Propyläen Kunstgeschichte (25 vols., 1923–35). Forty-one volumes were published by the time Pevsner retired from editing in 1977. His work was continued by Judy Nairn (his editorial assistant on the Buildings of England) and the medievalist Peter Lasko. Yale University Press acquired the series in 1992 when 45 titles had been completed; by 2004 they had published 21 volumes, mostly revisions of existing editions. New volumes continued to be produced up to the mid-2010s, alongside new editions of older ones.

== Reception ==
For Penguin the series was a departure from their commercial mainstay of paperbacks as the histories of art were the first large format, illustrated hardback books they had produced. Despite their relatively high price they were a financial success, yet for Pevsner they were intended primarily as graduate level texts in what was, for the English speaking world, the newly emerging academic discipline of art history. Nevertheless, the series was criticised from within the academy for its evident biases. Many of its authors were German émigrés, consequently there was a methodological preference for the kunstwissenschaft practiced in Vienna and Berlin between the wars; a formalism that ignored the social context of art. Robert Branner thus ended his review of Paul Frankl's volume on Gothic architecture by saying that although the book “has much to offer,” it “should bear an imprint date not of 1962, but of 1920.” This sense of datedness was compounded later, as most of the Yale volumes reprinted older Pelicans with only minor changes from their original 1950s–70s text, although Paul Crossley did add a lengthy historiographic foreword to his revision of Frankl's volume in particular.

Moreover, the weight given to some subjects seemed disproportionate to some critics, with seven of its original 47 volumes dedicated to English art, a "tributary of the main European current" as the Burlington Magazine observed. After the series moved to Yale, the revised plan folded much of English art back into the pan-European volumes.

Though the 1955 plan was never fully executed—the volumes on Greek painting and sculpture, quattrocento painting and cinquecento sculpture were not written—the Pelican History remains one of the most comprehensive surveys of world art published.

== List of volumes in the series ==
=== Volumes of the original series ===
Year	Title	Author(s)	Notes / Revised Editions
1953	Painting in Britain, 1530 to 1790	Ellis Waterhouse	Revised 1969, 1978; 4th edition 1994 (Yale).
1953	The Art and Architecture of India: Buddhist, Hindu, Jain	Benjamin Rowland	Revised 1956, 1967. Later replaced in the series by Harle's 1986 volume.
1953	Architecture in Britain, 1530 to 1830	John Summerson	Revised 1955, 1963, 1969, 1977, 1983, 1993 (Yale).
1953	Art and Architecture in France, 1500 to 1700	Anthony Blunt	Revised 1957, 1970, 1980; 5th edition revised by Richard Beresford 1999 (Yale).
1954	The Art and Architecture of Russia	George Heard Hamilton	Revised 1975, 1983.
1954	Painting in Britain: The Middle Ages	Margaret Rickert	Revised 1965.
1954	The Art and Architecture of the Ancient Orient	Henri Frankfort	Revised 1958, 1969, 1970; Yale edition 1996.
1955	The Art and Architecture of Japan	Robert Treat Paine and Alexander Soper	Revised 1975, 1981.
1955	Sculpture in Britain: The Middle Ages	Lawrence Stone	Revised 1972.
1956	Architecture in Britain: The Middle Ages	Geoffrey Webb	
1956	The Art and Architecture of China	Laurence Sickman and Alexander Soper	Revised 1968, 1971.
1957	Greek Architecture	A. W. Lawrence	Revised 1967, 1983; 5th edition revised by R. A. Tomlinson 1996 (Yale).
1958	Architecture: Nineteenth and Twentieth Centuries	Henry-Russell Hitchcock	Revised 1963, 1968, 1977, 1987.
1958	The Art and Architecture of Ancient Egypt	W. Stevenson Smith	Revised 1981; 3rd edition revised by William Kelly Simpson 1998 (Yale).
1958	Art and Architecture in Italy, 1600 to 1750	Rudolf Wittkower	Revised 1965, 1973, 1980. Expanded into three volumes in 1999.
1959	Carolingian and Romanesque Architecture, 800 to 1200	Kenneth John Conant	Revised 1966, 1973, 1978.
1959	Art and Architecture in Spain and Portugal and their American Dominions, 1500 to 1800	George Kubler and Martin Soria	Later replaced in the series by separate, more specialized volumes.
1960	Painting and Sculpture in Europe, 1780 to 1880	Fritz Novotny	Revised 1971, 1978.
1960	Art and Architecture in Belgium, 1600 to 1800	Horst Gerson and E. H. ter Kuile	Later replaced by Vlieghe's 1998 volume.
1962	The Art and Architecture of Ancient America: The Mexican, Maya and Andean Peoples	George Kubler	Revised 1975, 1984.
1962	Gothic Architecture	Paul Frankl	Revised by Paul Crossley 2000 (Yale).
1964	Sculpture in Britain, 1530 to 1830	Margaret Whinney	Revised by John Physick 1988.
1965	Early Christian and Byzantine Architecture	Richard Krautheimer	Revised 1975, 1979; 4th edition revised by Slobodan Ćurčić 1986.
1965	Baroque Art and Architecture in Central Europe	Eberhard Hempel	
1966	Art and Architecture in Italy, 1250 to 1400	John White	Revised 1987, 1993 (Yale).
1966	Dutch Art and Architecture, 1600 to 1800	Jakob Rosenberg, Seymour Slive, and E. H. ter Kuile	Revised 1972, 1977. Later split and replaced by individual volumes (i.e., Slive 1995).
1966	Sculpture in the Netherlands, Germany, France, and Spain: 1400 to 1500	Theodor Müller	
1966	Sculpture in Italy, 1400 to 1500	Charles Seymour Jr.	
1967	Painting and Sculpture in Europe, 1880 to 1940	George Heard Hamilton	Revised 1972, 1981, 1993 (Yale).
1968	Prehistoric Art in Europe	N. K. Sandars	Revised 1985, 1995 (Yale).
1969	Painting and Sculpture in Germany and the Netherlands, 1500 to 1600	Gert von der Osten and Horst Vey	
1970	Etruscan and Roman Architecture	Axel Boëthius and J. B. Ward-Perkins	Later split into two distinct volumes (Boëthius 1978, Ward-Perkins 1981).
1970	Early Christian and Byzantine Art	John Beckwith	Revised 1979.
1971	Painting in Italy, 1500 to 1600	S. J. Freedberg	Revised 1975, 1983, 1993 (Yale).
1971	Painting in Europe, 800 to 1200	C. R. Dodwell	Later replaced by Dodwell's 1993 volume.
1972	Art and Architecture of the Eighteenth Century in France	Wend von Kalnein and Michael Levey	Later split into two separate volumes (Levey 1993, Kalnein 1995).
1972	Ars Sacra, 800–1200	Peter Lasko	2nd edition 1995 (Yale).
1974	Architecture in Italy, 1400 to 1600	Ludwig H. Heydenreich and Wolfgang Lotz	Later split into two separate volumes (Lotz 1995, Heydenreich 1996).
1976	Roman Art	Donald Strong	Revised 1988, 1995 (Yale).
1976	American Art	John Wilmerding	
1978	The Arts in Prehistoric Greece	Sinclair Hood	
1978	Etruscan Art	Otto Brendel	Reissued 1995 (Yale).
1978	Etruscan and Early Roman Architecture	Axel Boëthius	Revised split of the 1970 joint volume. Yale edition 1994.
1981	Roman Imperial Architecture	J. B. Ward-Perkins	Revised split of the 1970 joint volume. Yale edition 1994.
1986	The Art and Architecture of the Indian Subcontinent	J. C. Harle	Replaced the 1953 Rowland volume. Yale edition 1994.
1987	The Art and Architecture of Islam, 650–1250	Richard Ettinghausen and Oleg Grabar	Yale edition 1994. Expanded in 2001 (Ettinghausen, Grabar, Jenkins-Madina).

=== Volumes added or revised for the Yale University Press Pelican History of Art ===
Year	Title	Author(s)	Notes / Revised Editions
1993	Painting and Sculpture in France, 1700–1789	Michael Levey	Revised split of the 1972 Kalnein/Levey volume.
1993	The Pictorial Arts of the West, 800–1200	C. R. Dodwell	Replaced Dodwell's 1971 volume.
1994	The Art and Architecture of Islam, 1250–1800	Sheila S. Blair and Jonathan M. Bloom	New addition to the series.
1995	Architecture in France in the Eighteenth Century	Wend von Kalnein	Revised split of the 1972 Kalnein/Levey volume.
1995	Dutch Painting, 1600–1800	Seymour Slive	Revised split of the 1966 Rosenberg/Slive/ter Kuile volume.
1995	Architecture in Italy, 1500–1600	Wolfgang Lotz	Revised split of the 1974 Heydenreich/Lotz volume; revised by Deborah Howard.
1995	The Arts of China to A.D. 900	William Watson	New addition to the series.
1995	Gothic Sculpture, 1140–1300	Paul Williamson	New addition to the series.
1996	Architecture in Italy, 1400–1500	Ludwig H. Heydenreich	Revised split of the 1974 Heydenreich/Lotz volume; revised by Paul Davies .
1998	Flemish Art and Architecture, 1585–1700	Hans Vlieghe	New addition; effectively replaced the 1960 Gerson/ter Kuile volume.
1998	Painting in Spain, 1500–1700	Jonathan Brown	New addition.
1999	Art and Architecture in Italy, 1600 to 1750: Volume 1, Early Baroque	Rudolf Wittkower, Joseph Connors, Jennifer Montagu	Split and greatly expanded from the 1958 Wittkower volume.
1999	Art and Architecture in Italy, 1600 to 1750: Volume 2, High Baroque	Rudolf Wittkower, Joseph Connors, Jennifer Montagu	Split and greatly expanded from the 1958 Wittkower volume.
1999	Art and Architecture in Italy, 1600 to 1750: Volume 3, Late Baroque	Rudolf Wittkower, Joseph Connors, Jennifer Montagu	Split and greatly expanded from the 1958 Wittkower volume.
2000	Gothic Architecture	Paul Frankl, revised by Paul Crossley	Major revised edition of the original 1962 text.
2000	The Arts of China 900–1620	William Watson	New addition to the series.
2001	Islamic Art and Architecture, 650–1250	Richard Ettinghausen, Oleg Grabar, Marilyn Jenkins-Madina	2nd Edition, deeply expanded from the 1987 volume.
2003	Art in France, 1900–1940	Christopher Green	New addition to the series.
2006	Art, Design, and Architecture in Central Europe 1890–1920	Elizabeth Clegg	New addition to the series.
2007	The Architecture of Alexandria and Egypt, c. 300 BC to AD 700	Judith McKenzie	New addition to the series.
2007	The Arts of China After 1620	William Watson and Chuimei Ho	New addition to the series.
2014	Romanesque Architecture: The First Style of the European Age	Eric Fernie	New addition to the series.
2015	Art in Britain 1660–1815	David Solkin	New addition to the series.

=== Volumes planned but not published ===
Volumes from the original Pelican series included a “complete list of titles” at the back giving a plan for the whole series.

Title	Author(s)
Sculpture and Painting in Greece, c.1100–100 B.C.	John Barron
The Dark Ages	David Wilson
Sculpture in Europe: 800–1200	George Zarnecki
Painting and Sculpture in Europe: 1200–1300	Willibald Sauerlander and Reiner Haussherr
Painting and Sculpture in Europe: 1300–1400	Gerhard Schmidt
Painting in Italy: 1400–1500	John Shearman
Sculpture in Italy: 1400–1500	Howard Hibbard and Kathleen Weil-Garris
Painting in the Netherlands, Germany, France, and Spain: 1400–1500	Charles Sterling
Painting in Britain: 1790–1890	Michael Kitson and R. Ormond

Additional volumes were proposed but never formally publicized. The process of commissioning volumes turned out to be quite difficult:

Geoffrey Grigson produced nothing on British Painting and Sculpture in the Twentieth Century, a volume that was never recommissioned. John Pope-Hennessy agreed to write on the Italian fourteenth century, but then claimed to have lost interest and asked to do the fifteenth century instead. This had already been offered to Kenneth Clark — who subsequently asked to be excused from the task on the grounds that he was no longer a scholar. Millard Meiss had his volume on French fourteenth-century painting removed from him. ‘We don’t like each other much,’ Pevsner told another scholar, ‘ever since I had to cancel his contract for a volume of the PHA, my reason being that he never sent me a single chapter of the volume, but, while he should have been busy on it, he wrote a completely different book in two volumes.’

== See also ==
- Oxford History of Art
- Thames & Hudson's World of Art
