= Crouthamel =

Crouthamel (Americanized form of German Krauthamer a variant of Krautheimer a habitational name for someone from any of several places called Krautheim in Baden, Bavaria and Thuringia) is a German language habitational surname. Notable people with the name include:

- E. Merton Crouthamel (1891–1984), former Souderton Area School District supervisor and Souderton businessman
- Jake Crouthamel (1938–2022), American football player, coach, and college athletic director
