= A. W. Mellon Lectures in the Fine Arts =

Public lecture series in Washington, D.C., U.S.

- Status: Active
- Genre: Lecture series
- Frequency: Annually
- Venue: National Gallery of Art
- Location: Washington, D.C.
- Country: United States
- Years active: 74
- Established: 1949
- Founders: Ailsa Mellon Bruce; Paul Mellon
- Most recent: 2022

The A. W. Mellon Lectures in the Fine Arts is an annual public lecture series, hosted by the National Gallery of Art in Washington, D.C., based on topics in the fine arts. Established in 1949 from an endowed gift from Ailsa Mellon Bruce and her brother, Paul Mellon, the series held its first lecture in 1952. While the series has featured mainly art historians, artists, composers, journalists, musicologists, poets, and scientists have also been invited to speak on art-related topics.

== History ==
Established in 1949, the Mellon Lectures in the Fine Arts were created as part of an endowed gift to the National Gallery of Art from the Avalon Foundation and the Old Dominion Foundation, ran respectively by Ailsa Mellon Bruce and her brother, Paul Mellon, of the wealthy Mellon family. The series was created in order "to bring to the people of the United States the results of the best contemporary thought and scholarship bearing upon the subject of the Fine Arts," and speakers must be of "exceptional ability, achievement, and reputation." The production of a book based on the talks has been funded by the Bollingen Foundation, run by Paul and his wife, Mary Conover.

The Mellon Lectures began in 1952. Its first speaker was the French philosopher Jacques Maritain of Princeton University, who gave a talk titled "Creative Intuition in Art and Poetry."

Since 1967, the Princeton University Press has published the book based on each talk. In 1969, the foundations merged to form the Andrew W. Mellon Foundation.

In 1987, the Mellon Lecture did not take place for the first time since its inception. It restarted a year later, with 2020 being the only other stoppage. In that year, the French art historian Yve-Alain Bois was named as the annual speaker, but the event was postponed for a later date. Again, the series would restart in the following year.

== Speakers ==
A. W. Mellon Lectures in the Fine Arts
Year	Speaker	Affiliation	Lecture Title
1952	Jacques Maritain	Princeton University	Creative Intuition in Art and Poetry
1953	Kenneth Clark	Arts Council of Great Britain	The Nude: A Study of Ideal Art
1954	Herbert Read	Harvard University	The Art of Sculpture
1955	Étienne Gilson	Pontifical Institute of Mediaeval Studies	Art and Reality
1956	Ernst Gombrich	University College London	The Visible World and the Language of Art
1957	Sigfried Giedion	University of Zurich	Constancy and Change in Art and Architecture
1958	Anthony Blunt	University of London	Nicolas Poussin and French Classicism
1959	Naum Gabo	Artist	A Sculptor's View of the Fine Arts
1960	Wilmarth Sheldon Lewis	Yale University	Horace Walpole
1961	André Grabar	Collège de France	Christian Iconography and the Christian Religion in Antiquity
1962	Kathleen Raine	Poet	William Blake and Traditional Mythology
1963	John Pope-Hennessy	Victoria and Albert Museum	Artist and Individual: Some Aspects of the Renaissance Portrait
1964	Jakob Rosenberg	Harvard University	On Quality in Art: Criteria of Excellence, Past and Present
1965	Isaiah Berlin	University of Oxford	Sources of Romantic Thought
1966	David Cecil	University of Oxford	Dreamer or Visionary: A Study of English Romantic Painting
1967	Mario Praz	Sapienza University of Rome	On the Parallel of Literature and the Visual Arts
1968	Stephen Spender	Poet	Imaginative Literature and Painting
1969	Jacob Bronowski	Scientist	Art as a Mode of Knowledge
1970	Nikolaus Pevsner	University of London	Some Aspects of Nineteenth‑Century Architecture
1971	T. S. R. Boase	University of Oxford	Vasari: The Man and the Book
1972	Ludwig Heinrich Heydenreich	LMU Munich	Leonardo da Vinci
1973	Jacques Barzun	Columbia University	The Use and Abuse of Art
1974	H.W. Janson	New York University	Nineteenth‑Century Sculpture Reconsidered
1975	H. C. Robbins Landon	Musicologist	Music in Europe in the Year 1776
1976	Peter von Blanckenhagen	New York University	Aspects of Classical Art
1977	André Chastel	Collège de France	The Sack of Rome: 1527
1978	Joseph Alsop	Journalist	The History of Art Collecting
1979	John Rewald	City University of New York	Paul Cézanne and America
1980	Peter Kidson	University of London	Principles of Design in Ancient and Medieval Architecture
1981	John Harris	Royal Institute of British Architects	Palladian Architecture in England, 1615–1760
1982	Leo Steinberg	University of Pennsylvania	The Burden of Michelangelo's Painting
1983	Vincent Scully	Yale University	The Shape of France
1984	Richard Wollheim	Columbia University	Painting as an Art
1985	James S. Ackerman	Harvard University	The Villa in History
1986	Lukas Foss	Brooklyn Philharmonic	Confessions of a Twentieth‑Century Composer
1988	John Shearman	Princeton University	Art and the Spectator in the Italian Renaissance
1989	Oleg Grabar	Harvard University	Intermediary Demons: Toward a Theory of Ornament
1990	Jennifer Montagu	Warburg Institute	Gold, Silver, and Bronze: Metal Sculpture of the Roman Baroque
1991	Willibald Sauerländer	Zentralinstitut für Kunstgeschichte	Changing Faces: Art and Physiognomy through the Ages
1992	Anthony Hecht	Georgetown University	The Laws of the Poetic Art
1993	John Boardman	University of Oxford	The Diffusion of Classical Art in Antiquity
1994	Jonathan Brown	New York University	Kings and Connoisseurs: Collecting Art in Seventeenth-Century Europe
1995	Arthur Danto	Columbia University	Contemporary Art and the Pale of History
1996	Pierre Rosenberg	Musée du Louvre	From Drawing to Painting: Poussin, Watteau, Fragonard, David, Ingres
1997	John Golding	Artist	Paths to the Absolute
1998	Lothar Ledderose	Heidelberg University	Ten Thousand Things: Module and Mass Production in Chinese Art
1999	Carlo Bertelli	Università della Svizzera Italiana	Transitions
2000	Marc Fumaroli	Collège de France	The Quarrel Between the Ancients and the Moderns in the Arts, 1600–1715
2001	Salvatore Settis	Scuola Normale Superiore di Pisa	Giorgione and Caravaggio: Art as Revolution
2002	Michael Fried	Johns Hopkins University	The Moment of Caravaggio
2003	Kirk Varnedoe	Institute for Advanced Study	Pictures of Nothing: Abstract Art Since Pollock
2004	Irving Lavin	Princeton University	More Than Meets the Eye
2005	Irene J. Winter	Harvard University	“Great Work”: Terms of Aesthetic Experience in Ancient Mesopotamia
2006	Simon Schama	Columbia University	Really Old Masters: Age, Infirmity, and Reinvention
2007	Helen Vendler	Harvard University	Last Looks, Last Books: The Binocular Poetry of Death
2008	Joseph Koerner	Harvard University	Bosch and Bruegel: Parallel Worlds?
2009	T. J. Clark	University of California, Berkeley	Picasso and Truth
2010	Mary Miller	Yale University	Art and Representation in the Ancient New World
2011	Mary Beard	University of Cambridge	The Twelve Caesars: Images of Power from Ancient Rome to Salvador Dalí
2012	Craig Clunas	University of Oxford	Chinese Painting and Its Audiences
2013	Barry Bergdoll	Columbia University	Out of Site in Plain View: A History of Exhibiting Architecture Since 1750
2014	Anthony Grafton	Princeton University	Past Belief: Visions of Early Christianity in Renaissance and Reformation Europe
2015	Thomas Crow	New York University	Restoration as Event and Idea: Art in Europe, 1814‒1820
2016	Vidya Dehejia	Columbia University	The Thief Who Stole My Heart: The Material Life of Chola Bronzes from South India, c. 855‒1280
2017	Alexander Nemerov	Stanford University	The Forest: America in the 1830s
2018	Hal Foster	Princeton University	Positive Barbarism: Brutal Aesthetics in the Postwar Period
2019	Wu Hung	University of Chicago	End as Beginning: Chinese Art and Dynastic Time
2020	Yve-Alain Bois	Princeton University	Transparence and Ambiguity: The Modern Space of Axonometry
2021	Jennifer Roberts	Harvard University	Contact: Art and the Pull of Print
2022	Richard J. Powell	Duke University	Colorstruck! Painting, Pigment, Affect
2023	Stephen D. Houston	Brown University	Vital Signs: The Visual Cultures of Maya Writing
2024	Anna Deveare Smith	New York University	Chasing That Which Is Not Me / Chasing That Which Is Me

== See also ==
- List of public lecture series
