= Nicola Coldstream =

Architectural historian and archaeologist

Nicola Coldstream, FSA, (née Imogen Nicola Carr born June 1942) is a British architectural historian and academic with special interests in the 13th and 14th centuries. Coldstream studied History and Fine Arts at Cambridge University and obtained her PhD at the Courtauld Institute of Art.

== Professional service and memberships ==
Coldstream became a Fellow of the Society of Antiquaries of London (elected 11 November 1982) and in 1996 she became Deputy Editor of Grove Dictionary of Art. In recent years she has held the following positions: Vice-President (Current); Past President (2004–2007) British Archaeological Association; Chairman of the Corpus of Romanesque Sculpture in Britain and Ireland (2009–12); Trustee of Corpus of Romanesque Sculpture in Britain and Ireland (Current); Member of Church of England’s Cathedrals Fabric Commission (2016–2021) and Sculpture and Furnishings Conservation Committee.

== Writing ==
In The Decorated Style: Architecture and Ornament, 1240-1360 (1994), Coldstream highlights the effects on patron influence on architectural design and commissions.

Medieval Architecture (2002), an Oxford History of Art book about the medieval period of architecture was called by Contemporary Review a "beautifully written survey of a long period which does not flag." Medieval Architecture is organized by thematic style and emphasizes religious architecture. The Art Book writes that the book is beautifully illustrated and has "fascinating new perspectives on world art and architecture," however, the book may not be easy for beginners to navigate the terminology.

Coldstream contributed to the 2011 volume in honour of Paul Crossley, Image, Memory and Devotion: Liber Amicorum Paul Crossley (Studies in Gothic Art 2) edited by Zoë Opačić and Achim Timmermann. In her chapter, Coldstream provides "a new interpretation of the so-called Eleanor Crosses", arguing that "the twelve crosses may have been a calculated allusion to the twelve gates of the New Jerusalem in Revelation 21.12."

== Selected works ==
- Medieval Architecture (Oxford University Press, 2002) ISBN 9780192842763
- The Decorated Style : Architecture and Ornament, 1240–1360 (University of Toronto Press, 1994) ISBN 9780802007001
- Masons and Sculptors (University of Toronto Press, Scholarly Publishing Division, 1991) ISBN 9780802069160
- Coldstream contributed an article on fellow medievalist and art historian Jean Bony to Women Medievalists and the Academy, 2005, edited by Jane Chance ISBN 0299207501.

== Personal life ==
Coldstream has published written work and photographs as 'Imogen Coldstream' and 'Nicola Carr', and 'Imogen Coldstream' is the name registered with the Society of Antiquaries.

Coldstream was married to the British archaeologist Nicolas Coldstream, who was also a Fellow of the Society of Antiquaries.

=== Other information ===
Photographs contributed by Nicola Coldstream to the Conway Library are currently being digitised by the Courtauld Institute of Art, as part of the Courtauld Connects project.
