= Rickert (surname) =

Rickert is a surname of German origin. Notable people with the surname include:

- Cornelia Rickert (born 1954), German volleyball player
- Edith Rickert (1871–1938), American medieval scholar
- Heinrich Rickert (1863–1936), German philosopher
- Heinrich Edwin Rickert (1833–1902), German journalist and liberal politician
- Jacki Rickert (1951–2017), American cannabis activist
- Jessica Rickert (born 1950), American dentist
- Joe Rickert (1876–1943), American baseball player
- John Rickert (born 1970), American sports agent
- Klaus Rickert (born 1946), German politician
- Marcus Rickert (born 1984), German football goalkeeper
- Margaret Rickert (1888–1973), American art historian and codebreaker
- Marv Rickert (1921–1978), American baseball player
- M. Rickert (Mary Rickert, born 1959), American writer
- Paul Rickert (1945–2023), American artist
- Paul "Skip" Rickert, American songwriter and film producer
- Rick Rickert (born 1983), American basketball player
- Shirley Jean Rickert (1926–2009), American child actress
- Thomas A. Rickert (1876–1941), American labor union leader

== See also ==
- Rickert v. Public Disclosure Commission, Washington State Supreme Court case
