= Madonna and Child with Saint Jerome and Saint John the Baptist =

Painting by Cima da Conegliano

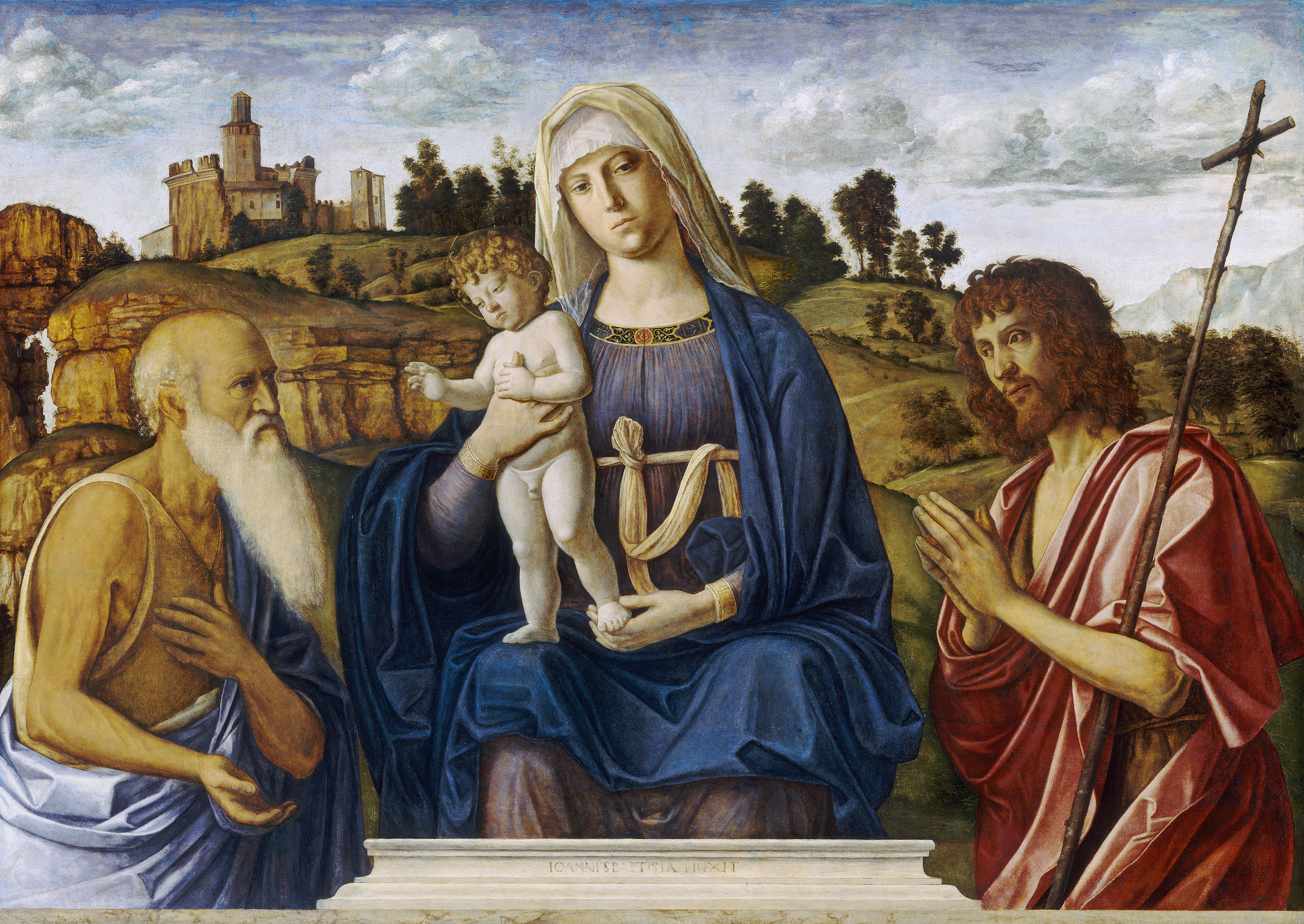
Madonna and Child with Saint Jerome and Saint John the Baptist (1492–1495) by Cima da Conegliano

Madonna and Child with Saint Jerome and Saint John the Baptist is an oil-on-panel painting executed ca. 1492–1495 by the Italian Renaissance painter Cima da Conegliano, now in the National Gallery of Art (NGA) in Washington.

A 1712 posthumous inventory of Giovanni Castelli's collection in Venice mentioned a painting showing "the Virgin and Child, Saint John the Baptist and Saint Jerome, by Cima, on panel", usually identified with this painting. It is also included in an early 20th-century transcription of a 19th-century list of 29 works from the 1712 inventory, seemingly owned by a Venetian family before being dispersed little by little from 1884 onwards.

The NGA also owns a 1940 letter asserting the work was owned by a "Baron Marochetti", either the sculptor Carlo Marochetti or (more probably since the work is not mentioned in an 1868 catalogue of Carlo's collection) his son Baron Maurizio Marochetti, of Turin, Italy's Russian ambassador. Ellis Waterhouse also writes that it was once owned by the Orelli family, into which Maurizio married. It was then bought in 1919 by Edgar Vincent, 1st Baron D'Abernon and remained in his collection until at least 1925, before being bought by the A.W. Mellon Educational and Charitable Trust in 1936 and donated to its present owner the following year.
