= Thomas Mapilton =

English architect (fl. 1408 - died 1438)

Thomas Mapilton (fl. 1408 - died 1438) was an English gothic architect responsible for old St Stephen Walbrook (London), the cloisters of Durham Cathedral and the south western tower of Canterbury Cathedral. According to Harvey (1978) he may also have visited Florence Cathedral in 1420 as a consultant.
