= Paul Crossley =

Paul Crossley may refer to:

- Paul Crossley (pianist) (born 1944), British pianist
- Paul Crossley (footballer) (1948–1996), English footballer
- Paul Crossley (art historian) (1945–2019), professor of the history of art
