= William Watson (sinologist) =

British sinologist and art historian (1917–2007)

William Watson CBE (9 December 1917 – 15 March 2007) was a British art historian who was Professor of Chinese art and archaeology at the University of London. He was a leading member of the teams that organised the Genius of China exhibition at the Royal Academy in 1973 and the Great Japan Exhibition, held in 1981–82. He made a major contribution to Japanese art studies in the UK.

== Early life ==
Watson was born in Derby, England, but moved with his family to Brazil, where his father managed a sugar-making plant. He returned to Britain in 1925 to study at schools in Glasgow and Derby, living with relatives. Already a scholar of Welsh, in 1936 he went up from Herbert Strutt School in Belper to Gonville and Caius College, Cambridge, where he read French, German and Russian.

== Military career ==
In 1939 Watson volunteered for the army, where his linguistic skills were put to use in the Intelligence Corps, with postings to Egypt and India. Here he intercepted German radio traffic for dispatch to Bletchley Park, and later interrogated Japanese prisoners of war, developing a passion for Asian languages. In 1940 he married Kay Armfield, a fellow Cambridge student.

== British Museum ==
After the war Watson joined the British Museum, where he became assistant keeper of British and medieval antiquities. He moved later to the Department of Oriental Antiquities. In 1954 he spent a year in Japan, where he encountered classic Japanese painting and sculpture, met leading scholars, and acquired a working knowledge of the language and writing. He also visited China, establishing contacts that later enabled him to play a leading role in cultural relations in the early 1970s. In late 1960 through early 1970s Watson led several archaeological expeditions to Thailand to explore pre- and proto-historic sites and their cultural relationships with early sites in Southwest China.

== University of London ==
In 1966 Watson took up a post as professor at the School of Oriental and African Studies (SOAS). This involved responsibility for the collection of Chinese ceramics at the Percival David Foundation. He was a leading member of the team that organised the Genius of China exhibition at the Royal Academy in 1973, and presented a BBC documentary with Magnus Magnusson, filmed on location in China. He also made a major contribution to Japanese art studies in the UK. In 1972 Watson became a Fellow of the British Academy. In 1975-76 he was Slade Professor of Fine Art at Cambridge.

In 1979 the Royal Academy turned to Watson to chair the curatorial committees for the Great Japan Exhibition, held in 1981–82. Under Watson's guidance this focused on the approachable, mainly secular, art of the Edo period, with both exhibition and catalogue produced by British specialists, rather than being simply imported from Japan.

In the early 1980s Watson attempted to have the teaching of Japanese art history started at the Courtauld Institute. Although unsuccessful, this paved the way for the creation of teaching posts elsewhere.

From 1980 to 1990 Watson was a trustee of the British Museum and in 1982 was made a Commander of the Order of the British Empire (CBE) in the 1982 Birthday Honours.

== Retirement ==
Watson retired in 1983 as head of the Percival David Foundation, and became emeritus professor. He published widely on China, Iran and Anatolia. His last work, the final book of a three-volume set on China for the Pelican History of Art series, was published shortly before his death.

== Selected bibliography ==
- Watson W. (1959), Sculpture of Japan from the fifth to the fifteenth century. London: The Studio
- Watson W. (1966), Early Civilization in China (Library of Early Civilizations), Thames & Hudson, ISBN 0-500-29005-9
- Watson W. & Sieveking, G. de G. (3rd ed 1968), Flint Implements: an account of Stone Age techniques and cultures, London: British Museum, ISBN 0-7141-1306-9
- Watson W. (1971), Cultural Frontiers in Ancient East Asia
- Watson W., Genius of China (exhibition, Royal Academy of Arts), 1973, Times Newspapers Ltd, ISBN 0723001073
- Watson W. (1974), Style in the Arts of China, 1974, Penguin, ISBN 0140218637
- Watson W. & R. B. Smith (eds.)(1979), Early South East Asia: essays in archaeology, history, and historical geography. Oxford University Press, 1979.
- Watson W. (ed.) (1981), The Great Japan Exhibition: Art of the Edo Period, 1600-1868 (Exhibition Catalogue). London: Royal Academy of Arts.
- Watson W. (1995), The Arts of China to A. D. 900. Yale University Press Pelican History of Art Series. Vol 1 (of 3). New Haven: Yale University Press, ISBN 0-300-08284-3, 2000.
- Watson W. (2000), The Arts of China 900–1620. Yale University Press Pelican History of Art Series. Vol 2 (of 3) ISBN 0-300-07393-3, 2003
- Watson W. & Chuimei Ho (2007), The Arts of China, 1600-1900 Yale University Press Pelican History of Art Series. Vol 3 (of 3), ISBN 0-300-10735-8, 2007
