= Richard Krautheimer =

German art historian (1897–1994)

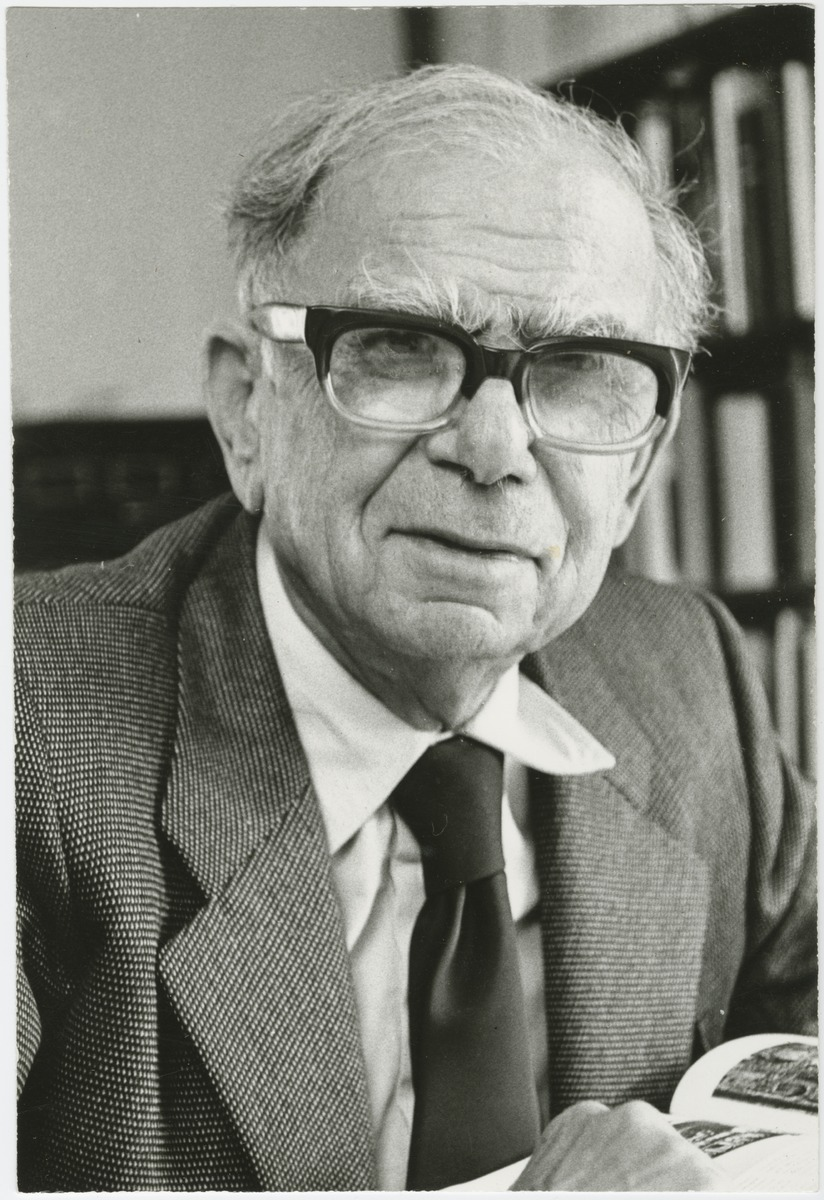
- Born: 6 July 1897; Fürth (Franconia), Germany
- Died: 1 November 1994 (aged 97); Rome, Italy
- Spouse: Trude Krautheimer-Hess

Academic background
- Thesis: Die Kirchen der Bettelorden in Deutschland (1240–1340)

Academic work
- Discipline: art history
- Sub-discipline: Byzantine art
- Notable works: Corpus Basilicarum

Richard Krautheimer (6 July 1897 in Fürth (Franconia), Germany – 1 November 1994 in Rome, Italy) was a German art historian, architectural historian, Baroque scholar, and Byzantinist.

== Biography ==
Krautheimer was born in a Jewish family in Germany in 1897, the son of Nathan Krautheimer and Martha Landmann (Krautheimer). Krautheimer's cousin, Ernst Kitzinger, would also become a prominent Byzantinist. Krautheimer fought in the First World War as an enlisted soldier in the German army (1916–18). Between 1919 and 1923, he initially studied law at, successively, universities in Munich, Berlin, and Marburg under faculty who included Heinrich Wölfflin, Adolf Goldschmidt and Werner Weisbach. During these years, he briefly worked on the state inventory of Churches for Erfurt (Inventarisierung der Erfurter Kirchen für die Preussische Denkmalpflege). In 1924 he married Trude Hess, who subsequently also studied art history and became a noted scholar and collector herself. He completed his dissertation in Halle under Paul Frankl in 1925 with the title Die Kirchen der Bettelorden in Deutschland (1240–1340). Frankl's work remained a strong influence for Krautheimer throughout his life. Willibald Sauerländer contends that it was Krautheimer who later introduced Frankl's work to the United States. The systematizing methodology of Krautheimer's mentor, Frankl, "never left Krautheimer" according to Willibald Sauerlander.

In 1927 he completed his habilitation under Richard Hamann in Marburg. The same year, while researching at the Bibliotheca Hertziana in Rome, Krautheimer developed the idea for a handbook of Roman churches with a colleague, Rudolf Wittkower, later to become the Corpus Basilicarum. In 1928 he accepted a privatdozent teaching position at Marburg. Except for studies-in-residence at the Hertziana (1930/31, 32/33) he remained at Marburg. The Krautheimers fled Nazi persecution, leaving Germany for good. Between 1933 and 1935 Krautheimer worked on the Corpus, accepting paying employment from Frankl's son in the city. The ever-declining political situation for Jews in Axis-alliance countries compelled the Krautheimers to emigrate to the United States of America. Krautheimer found a position at the University of Louisville, Kentucky, a university he purportedly had never heard of. At his request, Louisville hired another fleeing art historian, Krautheimer's friend from school days, Justus Bier. Krautheimer moved to Vassar in 1937 at the request of Vassar's Art Department chair, Agnes Claflin. That same year saw Krautheimer's first volume of the Corpus Basilicarum Christianarum Romae, a scholarly inventory and documentation of the early Christian churches in Rome eventually running to five volumes. The set would not be completed until 1977. Following US entry into World War II, he and Trude became naturalized citizens. Richard volunteered for duty as a senior research analyst for the Office of Strategic Services for the years 1942–44. Here he analyzed aerial photographs of Rome to assist in the protection of historic buildings during bombing. While still at Vassar, he taught (with lecturer status) at New York University (1938–49). Krautheimer was also one of the co-founders of the Census research project, which was founded in 1946 as a cooperation between the Warburg Institute and the Institute of Fine Arts. He moved to NYU permanently in 1952 as the Jayne Wrightsman Professor of Fine Arts. The early 1950s were devoted to researching his one monograph on an artist, Lorenzo Ghiberti, published jointly with his wife in 1956. He would serve for one semester as acting Director of the Institute of Fine Arts at New York University. He was elected to the American Academy of Arts and Sciences in 1958 and the American Philosophical Society in 1965.

Krautheimer next engaged in what he called his most difficult book to research and write: the survey volume on early Christian architecture for the Pelican History of Art. The manuscript was completed in 1963 and published two years later. The volume turned out to be one of the finest syntheses of late antique/early medieval architecture published and brought Krautheimer his widest readership. He revised and reissued the work twice, in 1975 and 1979. After a second tome on Ghiberti in 1971, Krautheimer retired from NYU as Samuel F. B. Morse Professor Emeritus and returned to Rome. Wolfgang Lotz, friend and fellow architectural historian, offered him a residence at the Bibliotheca Hertziana. There, Krautheimer completed his long-standing research on the Corpus Basilicarum. In these final years he set to work writing two of his most synthetic and lyrical works on art history. Rome: Profile of a City (1980) and The Rome of Alexander VII (1985) combined social history, vast breadth of archival knowledge and insightful architectural history into single volumes. In both cases, Krautheimer selected comparatively neglected periods in Roman history to offer a compelling narrative of the interaction of public works and patronage. While assisting friends with plans for his 100th birthday, Krautheimer died at 97 at the Palazzo Zuccari. His wife had preceded him in death seven years before. His many students at New York University included Howard Saalman, Leo Steinberg, James S. Ackerman, Frances Huemer, Marvin Trachtenberg, Slobodan Curcic, and Dale Kinney.

He died on 1 November 1994 and is buried in the Protestant Cemetery, Rome.

== Publications ==
- [dissertation] Die Kirchen der Bettelorden in Deutschland, 1240–1340. Cologne, 1925.
- [habilitation] Mittelalterliche Synagogen. Marburg-Wittenberg, 1927.
- Mittelalterliche Synagogen. Berlin: Frankfurter Verlags-Anstalt, 1927.
- Zur venezianischen Trecentoplastik. Marburg an der Lahn: Verlag des Kunstgeschichtlichen Seminars der Universität Marburg an der Lahn, 1926–1935.
- Opicinus de Canistris; Weltbild und Bekenntnisse eines avignonesischen Klerikers des 14. Jahrhunderts. London: The Warburg Institute, 1936.
- "The Carolingian Revival of Early Christian Architecture." Art Bulletin 24 (1942): 1–38. Reprinted in a slightly revised version in Studies in Early Christian, Medieval and Renaissance Art (above): 203–56.
- "Sancta Maria Rotunda." Arte del Primo millennio, Atti del II convegno per lo studio dell'arte dell'alto medio evo tenuto presso l'Università di Pavia nel settembre 1950. Edited by Edoardo Arslan. Turin: 1953: 21–7.
- and Krautheimer-Hess, Trude. Lorenzo Ghiberti. Princeton: Princeton University Press, 1956
- "Mensa-coemeterium-martyium." Cahiers archeologiques 11 (1960): 15–40.
- The architecture of Sixtus III: a fifth-century renascence?. New York University Press, 1961.
- "Riflessioni sull'architettura paleocristiana." In Atti del VI Congresso Internationale di Archeologia Cristiana, Ravena 23–30 settembre 1962. Studi di Antichità Christiana 26. Vatican City: 1965, pp. 567–79.
- Early Christian and Byzantine Architecture. Baltimore: Penguin Books,1965.
- "Introduction to an Iconography of Medieval Architecture." Journal of the Courtald and Warburg Institutes 5 (1942): 1–33, reprinted in: Studies in Early Christian, Medieval and Renaissance Art. Edited by James S. Ackerman et al. New York: New York University Press, 1969.
- Ghiberti's Bronze Doors. Princeton, NJ: Princeton University Press, 1971.
- Corpus Basilicarum Christianarum Romae: The early Christian Basilicas of Rome (IV–IX Centuries). Vatican City: Pontificio istituto di archeologia cristiana, 1937–1977.
- Rome: Profile of a City, 312–1308. Princeton: Princeton University Press, 1980.
- Three Christian Capitals: Topography and Politics. Berkeley: University of California Press, 1983.
- The Rome of Alexander VII, 1655–1667. Princeton, NJ: Princeton University Press, 1985.

== Sources ==
- lib.duke.edu
