= Krautheimer =

Krautheimer (habitational name for someone from any of several places called Krautheim in Baden, Bavaria and Thuringia) is a German language habitational surname. Notable people with the name include:

- Anton Krautheimer (1879–?), German sculptor
- Richard Krautheimer (1897–1994), German art historian
