= John White (art historian) =

English historian (1924–2021)

John Edward Clement Twarowski White, CBE, FSA (4 October 1924 – 6 November 2021) was a British art historian and was formerly the head of the Department of History of Art at the University College London (UCL). In 1992 he was made an Honorary Fellow of UCL. He was also the author of a number of books on Medieval and Renaissance art, as well as on the artist Duccio of Siena.

== Biography ==
White went straight from Ampleforth College to the Royal Air Force, where he became a Spitfire flying instructor based in Canada. He matriculated at Trinity College, Oxford in 1942, spending two terms there as a RAF Probationer. After the war he returned to the United Kingdom and became a student of Anthony Blunt at the Courtauld Institute of Art, University of London in 1947. White subsequently gained his doctorate as a junior research fellow at the Warburg Institute in London.

White then went to Cambridge University, He then took a succession of academic positions; first, at the Art History department at Johns Hopkins University, then Alexander White Visiting Professor at the University of Chicago (1958); then Pilkington Professor of history of art at University of Manchester and director of Whitworth Art Gallery 1959–66, then Ferens Visiting professor of fine art the University of Hull 1961–62; then Chairman of the Art Advisory Panel NW Museum and Art Gallery Services 1966–66; then professor of history of art and chairman Department of History of Art Johns Hopkins University Baltimore 1977–71; UCL: and finally Durning-Lawrence Professor of history of art at UCL 1971–90.

White was also a poet; his published work includes a book of English poems translated into Japanese and published in Japan called The Breath in the Flute. His 24 collections of poetry have since been published online, alongside a collection of his permutation poetry.

Although not a Buddhist, he had had a long association with a Buddhist temple, Shogyoji, a Shin Buddhist (Pure Land) Temple in southern Japan, as well as a branch of the temple, Three Wheels, in London. Over the course of 30 years, he gave 28 lectures at Shogyoji.

In the 1990s he also served on the Armed Forces Pay Review body which advises the UK government on armed forces salaries.

In his later years, White was a glider pilot, having taken up gliding 50 years after he last piloted a Spitfire. He flew at The London Gliding Club, Dunstable and held the diamond certificate for glider pilots, having completed 500 km and 25.000 in altitude (achieved after his 80th birthday). He lived in London.

White had been collaborating with Prof. Taira Sato on new translations of the Haiku of three Japanese haiku masters who lived 500 years ago. The first book, 5-7-5 The Haiku of Basho, was published in 2019, containing new translations of three hundred haiku, a work which was started after his 93rd birthday.

White died on 6 November 2021, at the age of 97.

== Selected works ==
- The Birth and Rebirth of Pictorial Space, London : Faber and Faber, 1957.
  - book reviewed by Alfred Neumeyer in The Journal of Aesthetics and Art Criticism, Vol. 17, No. 1 (Sep. 1958), pp. 130–131, Blackwell Publishing on behalf of The American Society for Aesthetics
- Art and Architecture in Italy, 1250 to 1400, London/Baltimore : Penguin Books, 1966, 2nd edn 1987 (Pelican History of Art).
- 5-7-5 The Haiku of Basho. 2019. John White and Taira Sato. A new translation.
- Done For The Doing, Web, doneforthedoing.com
- Fifteen Words, A collection of permutation poetry, fifteenwords.com
