= Wolfgang Lotz (art historian) =

German art historian of Italian renaissance architecture

Wolfgang Lotz (April 19, 1912, in Heilbronn – October 24, 1981, in Rome) was a German art historian specialized in Italian Renaissance architecture.

== Life and work ==
Lotz first studied Law in Freiburg im Breisgau and then art history at the Ludwig-Maximilians-Universität München and the University of Hamburg, where he was a student of Ludwig Heinrich Heydenreich. In 1937, he completed his Ph.D. dissertation on Giacomo Barozzi da Vignola's architecture. He first worked at the Kunsthistorisches Institut in Florenz, and after his return from military service he was assigned to the International Commission for Monuments in Munich. Then he worked (under Heydenreich as director) as deputy director at the Zentralinstitut für Kunstgeschichte in Munich. In 1952, he was appointed professor of art at Vassar, replacing Richard Krautheimer. In 1959, he again replaced Krautheimer, this time at the Institute of Fine Arts, New York University. From 1962 on, he was director of the Bibliotheca Hertziana – Max Planck Institute of Art History in Rome.

In 1974, he published, with Heydenreich, his most popular book, the 38th volume of the Pelican History of Art, entitled The Architecture in Italy: 1400-1600. It presents a survey of Italian Renaissance architecture in the Cinquecento, discussing the work of Donato Bramante, Giulio Romano, Michelangelo, and Andrea Palladio, among others, as well as the various centers of architectural activity throughout Italy. Three years later, Lotz published a selection of essays entitled, Studies in Italian Renaissance Architecture.

He was elected president of the Centro Internazionale di Studi di Architettura Andrea Palladio in Vicenza and retired from the Bibliotheca Hertziana in 1980.

== Select publications ==
- Vignola-Studien: Beiträge zu einer Vignola-Monographie. Würzburg-Aumühle: K. Triltsch, 1939.
- "Die ovalen Kirchenräume des Cinquecento." Römisches Jahrbuch für Kunstgeschichte, vol. 7 (1955), pp. 7–99.
- The Northern Renaissance. New York: Abrams, 1955.
- "Redefinitions of Style: Architecture in the Later 16th Century." College Art Journal, vol. 17 (1958), pp. 129–39.
- "Mannerism in Architecture. Changing Aspects". In The Renaissance and Mannerism – Studies in Western Art: Acts of the Twentieth International Congress of the History of Art II. Princeton, N.J. 1963, pp. 239–246.
- "Die Spanische Treppe. Architektur als Mittel der Diplomatie." In Römisches Jahrbuch für Kunstgeschichte, vol. 12, 1969, pp. 39–94.
- (with Ludwig H. Heydenreich), Architecture in Italy, 1400 to 1600. Baltimore, MD: Penguin Books, 1974.
- Studies in Italian Renaissance Architecture. Cambridge, MA: MIT Press, 1977.
