= Trude Krautheimer-Hess =

German art historian (1902–1987)

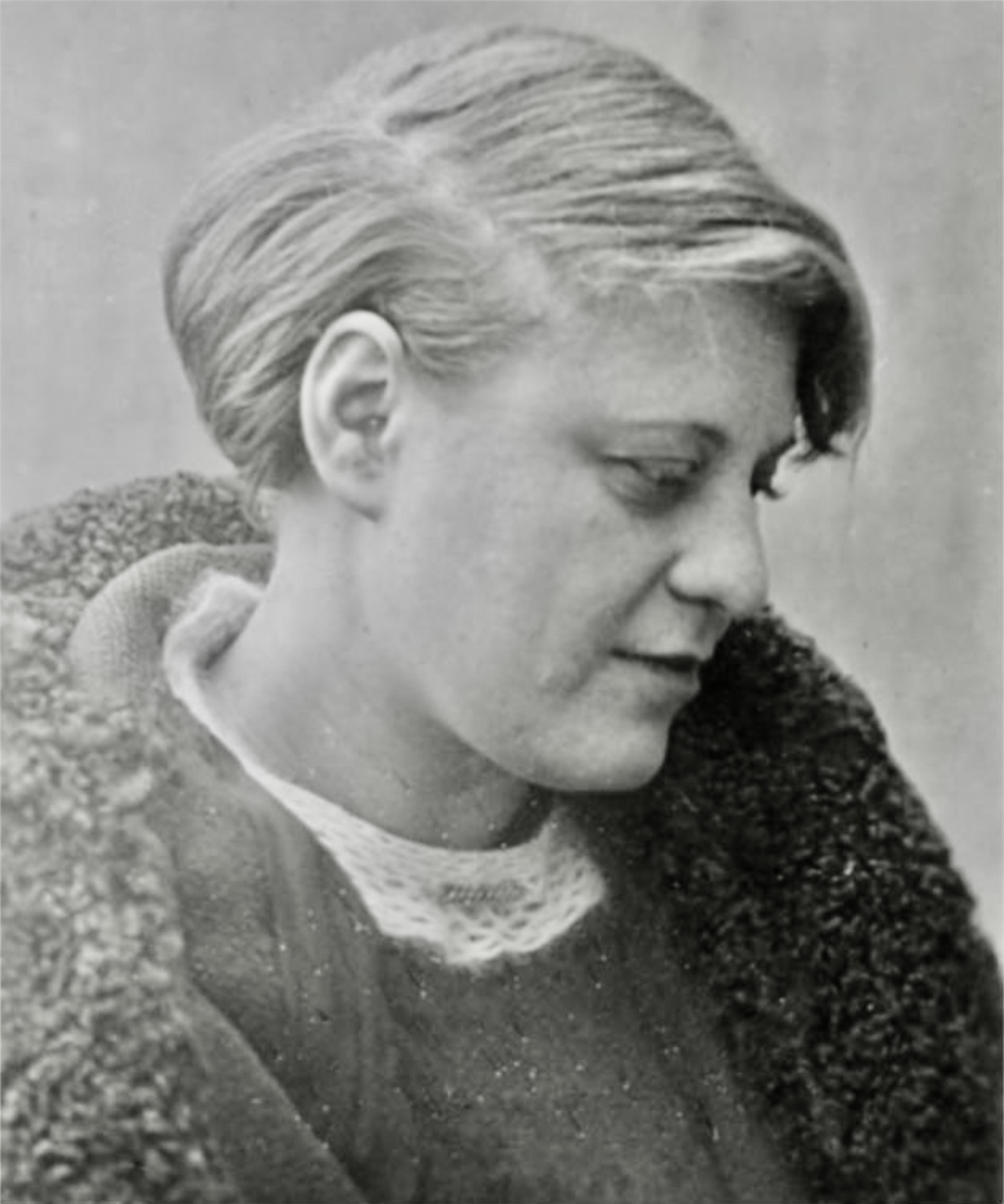
- 22-year-old Trude Hess, c. 1924
- Born: 11 February 1902; Erfurt, German Empire
- Died: 12 September 1987 (aged 85); Rome, Italy
- Education: Goethe University Frankfurt
- Occupation: Art historian
- Spouse: Richard Krautheimer

Trude Krautheimer-Hess (née Hess; 11 February 1902, Erfurt – 12 September 1987, Rome) was a German-American art historian and art collector.

== Early life and education ==
Trude Hess was born into a wealthy Jewish industrialist family in Erfurt. Her father, Georg Hess, a shoe manufacturer (born 20 October 1868 in Berkach, Meiningen district, Duchy of Saxe-Meiningen; died 30 April 1943), was murdered at the Sobibor extermination camp. Her mother, Frieda Hess (née Heilbronner; born 21 November 1880 in Augsburg; died 25 September 1942 in Amsterdam), also fell victim to the Holocaust; fearing imminent deportation, she committed suicide by poisoning.

From an early age, she came into contact with art and art historians through her cousin Alfred Hess, a prominent industrialist and collector of Expressionist art.

In March 1924, she married the art historian Richard Krautheimer. The marriage remained childless. The couple initially lived in Marburg, where her husband taught at the university. Until 1933, they traveled together to France, Greece, Italy, and Turkey.

In August 1933, they emigrated, first to Rome and then, in December 1935, via Cherbourg to the United States. They initially lived in Louisville, later in Poughkeepsie from 1937, and finally in New York from 1952, where Richard Krautheimer taught as a professor. In 1971, they returned to Rome.

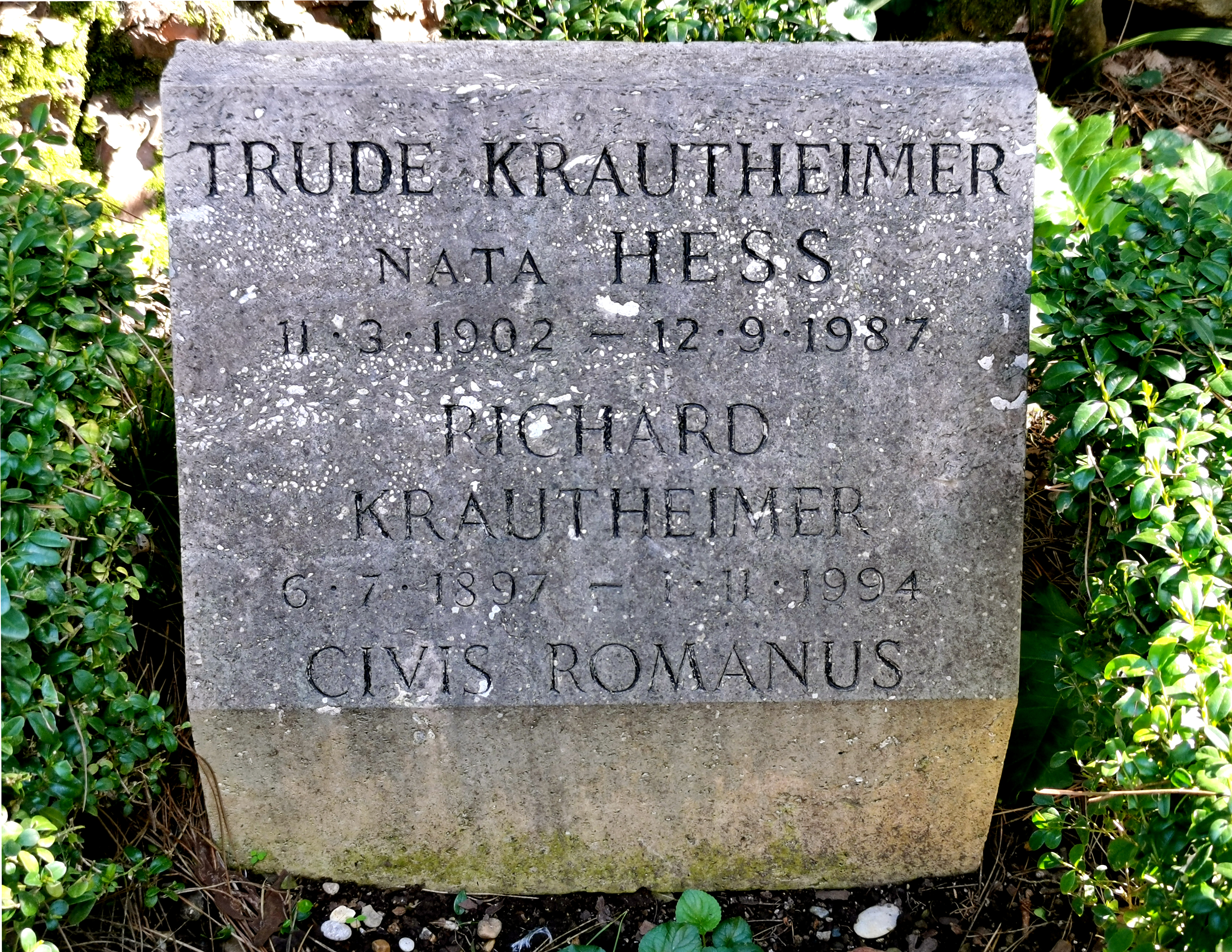
Grave in the Protestant Cemetery, Rome

Hess studied art history at the University of Jena, Goethe University Frankfurt, and Berlin. On 1 June 1927, she submitted her dissertation, titled Figurative Sculpture of Eastern Lombardy from 1100 to 1178, under the supervision of Rudolf Kautsch. She received her doctorate the following year from the Institute of Art History in Goethe University Frankfurt; her doctoral advisor was the historian Fjodor Schneider. Other academic mentors included the archaeologist Friedrich Drexel and the historian Walter Platzhoff.

== Career ==
She supported her husband in his research, particularly on the sculptor Lorenzo Ghiberti, and accompanied him to Italy beginning in August 1933. After emigrating to the United States, she continued her scholarly work from January 1936 in Kentucky, where her husband taught at the University of Louisville.

After the war, she resumed her research on Ghiberti and co-authored a manuscript with her husband, completed in 1954 and published as a book in 1956; further editions appeared in 1970 and 1982. In the 1940s and 1950s, she also published articles in The Art Bulletin and The Burlington Magazine.

During the 1950s and 1960s, she assembled a significant collection of paintings by Italian artists, which was exhibited at the Duke University Art Museum in Durham, North Carolina, in 1966. In early summer 1971, she and her husband moved into the Palazzo Zuccari in Rome, home of the Bibliotheca Hertziana (Max Planck Institute for Art History).

== Death ==
Krautheimer-Hess died at the age of 85 in Rome and was buried at the Protestant Cemetery (Cimitero Acattolico), near the Pyramid of Cestius. Her husband was buried there seven years later. Her art collection was auctioned in 1996.

== Publications ==
- Die figurale Plastik der Ostlombardei von 1100–1178. In: Marburger Jahrbuch für Kunstwissenschaft. Band 4, 1928, S. 231–307.
- Due sculture in legno del XIII sec. in Brindisi. In: L’ arte. NS 4 = 36, 1933, S. 18–29.
- The original Porta dei Mesi at Ferrara and the art of Niccolo. In: Art Bulletin. Band 26, 1944, S. 152–174.
- mit Richard Krautheimer: Lorenzo Ghiberti. Princeton University Press, Princeton, NJ 1956; revised editions 1970, 1982.
- Excavations at San Lorenzo f.l.m. in Rome, 1957. In: American Journal of Archaeology. Band 62, 1958, S. 379–382.
- Sheet of Sketches by Guido Reni. In: The Burlington Magazine. Nr. 104, 1962, S. 384–387, 500.
- More Ghibertia. In: Art Bulletin. Band 46, 1964, S. 307–321.

== Literature ==
- Old master drawings including 17th century Italian drawings from The Ferretti Di Castelferretto Collection; the property of the late Professor Doctor Richard Krautheimer and Doctor Trude Krautheimer-Hess, the executors of the late Miss Sybella Jane Bailey and from various sources. Christie's, London 2. Juli 1996.
- Krautheimer-Hess, Trude. In: Ulrike Wendland: Biographisches Handbuch deutschsprachiger Kunsthistoriker im Exil. Leben und Werk der unter dem Nationalsozialismus verfolgten und vertriebenen Wissenschaftler. Teil 1: A–K. K. G. Saur, München 1999, ISBN 3-598-11339-0, S. 386f.
- Krautheimer, Richard. In: Peter Betthausen, Peter H. Feist, Christiane Fork: Metzler Kunsthistoriker-Lexikon. 2. Auflage. Metzler, Stuttgart 2007, ISBN 978-3-476-02183-0, S. 244–247.
- Fabian Jonietz, Wolf-Dietrich Löhr: Per non tediare i lectori: qualche parola d’introduzione. In: Ghiberti teorico: natura, arte e coscienza storica nel Quattrocento. Officina Libraria, Mailand 2019, ISBN 978-88-336-7076-8, S. 7–25, hier S. 15–18 (Digitalisat).
- Ingo Herklotz: Richard Krautheimer in Deutschland – Aus den Anfängen einer wissenschaftlichen Karriere 1925–1933. Waxmann Verlag, Münster / New York 2021, S. 44–45, 370.
