= Helen Waterhouse =

British archeologist and classical scholar

Helen Thomas Waterhouse
- Born: Helen Thomas; 5 March 1913; Chaldon, England
- Died: 9 September 1999 (aged 86); Oxford, England
- Occupation: Archaeologist
- Spouse: Ellis Waterhouse

Academic background
- Education: Roedean School; Girton College, Cambridge

Academic work
- Discipline: Classical archaeology
- Institutions: British School at Athens; University of Manchester; University of Birmingham
- Notable works: The British School at Athens: the First Hundred Years

Helen Thomas Waterhouse, Lady Waterhouse (5 March 1913 – 9 September 1999) was a British archaeologist and classical scholar specialising in prehistoric Laconia (Sparta).

== Early life and education ==
Helen Thomas was born 5 March 1913 in Chaldon, England. Her father was Frederick William Thomas an Oxford Professor of Sanskrit and Oriental Languages. She was initially educated at home with a tutor, but later attended Roedean School, a public boarding school for girls.

After Roedean, Thomas went to Girton College, Cambridge to read classics. She graduated with a first class honours degree in classics with the additional distinction of a starred first in archaeology.

She married the English art historian Ellis Waterhouse in 1949.

== Archaeological career ==
After graduating from Cambridge, Waterhouse travelled to Greece where she attended the British School at Athens from 1935 to 1938. Her focus of study was the prehistory of mainland Greece under the direction of Alan Wace.

Her major field of research was the prehistoric Mycenaean civilisation, with an emphasis on Laconia and Sparta. In Sparta, she participated in a survey and the excavation of the palace of Menelaus. She later took part in the excavations of the Island of Ithaca at Stavros, directed by Sylvia Benton.

The Second World War interrupted her academic career. In 1939 she joined the cipher office at the British Legation in Athens and later worked for the Political Intelligence Centre in Cairo. On returning to London in 1941, she worked in the War Office as a civil assistant and later worked for the Research Department of the Foreign Office as a specialist on Greece. She returned to Greece in 1946 after the war ended. Waterhouse was appointed Librarian of the British School at Athens (1946–1947). She returned to England in 1948 and was Assistant Lecturer in Classics at the University of Manchester between 1948 and 1949. She later moved to Birmingham, where she was made an Honorary Lecturer and Research Fellow of Ancient History and Archaeology at the University of Birmingham (1966–1971)

Waterhouse contributed several articles in the Annual of British School of Athens and conducted surveys of the treasures of the Myceneans, Ithaca and Minoa. Her work in Laconia in the 1930s, and subsequent publications on that work in 1960 and 1961, "remains the fundamental study mapping the distribution of settlements throughout the region." Her last publication, in 1996, was From Ithaca to the Odyssey, a summary of the many archaeological explorations by members of the British School at Athens, and the influence of Odysseus and his stories on the history of ancient Greece. She died on 9 September 1999.

== Selected bibliography ==
- The Acropolis Treasure from Mycenae, BSA, Vol. 39 (1938–39) pp. 65–87
- Excavations at Stavros, Ithaca in 1937, BSA, Vol. 47 (1952) pp. 227–242
- Prehistoric Laconia: A Note, BSA, Vol.51 (1956) pp. 168–171
- Prehistoric Laconia: Part I, BSA, Vol.55 (1960) pp. 67–107, (with R. Hope Simpson)
- Prehistoric Laconia: Part II, BSA, Vol.56 (1961) pp. 114–175, (with R. Hope Simpson)
- Excavations in Ithaca: Tris Langadas, BSA, Vol.68 (1973) pp. 1–24, (with Sylvia Benton)
- The Palace and Place of Assembly in Minoan Crete, The Classical Review, Vol.35, Issue 1, (1985) pp. 151–153
- From Ithaca to the Odyssey, BSA, Vol. 91, (1996,) pp. 301–317
- The British School at Athens: the First 100 Years, BSA, Supplementary Volume 19, (1986)
