= Jennifer Roberts (art historian) =

American art historian

Jennifer L. Roberts
- Born: 1969 (age 56–57)
- Known for: Mirror-Travels
- Title: Elizabeth Cary Agassiz Professor of the Humanities; Johnson-Kulukunkdis Family Faculty Director of the Arts

Academic background
- Education: Stanford University; Yale University

Academic work
- Discipline: Art history
- Sub-discipline: American art
- Institutions: Harvard University

Jennifer L. Roberts is an American art historian. She serves as Elizabeth Cary Agassiz Professor of the Humanities and Johnson-Kulukunkdis Family Faculty Director of the Arts at the Radcliffe Institute for Advanced Study at Harvard University. Her research and teaching focuses on American art from the colonial period to the present.

== Education ==
Roberts attended Stanford University as an undergraduate, where she initially studied human biology before ultimately double-majoring in English and art history, though she did not begin the latter until her senior year. She graduated Phi Beta Kappa in 1992. She then earned an M.A. and Ph.D. from Yale University, graduating in 2000.

== Career ==
Roberts became an assistant professor at Harvard University in 2002.

Roberts’s first book, Mirror-Travels, explored the work of Robert Smithson, who created the Spiral Jetty in the Great Salt Lake, Utah.

In 2021, Roberts delivered the seventieth A. W. Mellon Lectures in the Fine Arts.

== Works ==
- Mirror-Travels: Robert Smithson and History (Yale University Press, 2004) ISBN 9780300094978, OCLC 959162488
- American Encounters: Art, History, and Cultural Identity (Prentice Hall, 2007) ISBN 9780136140481, OCLC 154674600
- Jasper Johns/In Press: The Crosshatch Works and the Logic of Print (Harvard Art Museums, 2012) ISBN 9783775732918, OCLC 827782553
- Transporting Visions: the Movement of Images in Early America (University of California Press, 2014) ISBN 9780520251847, OCLC 876039376
