= Ellis Waterhouse =

British art historian (1905–1985)

Sir Ellis Kirkham Waterhouse
- Born: 16 February 1905
- Died: 7 September 1985 (aged 80)
- Education: Marlborough College
- Alma mater: New College, Oxford; Princeton University
- Occupation: Art historian
- Partner: Helen Waterhouse
- Parent: Percy Leslie Waterhouse

Sir Ellis Kirkham Waterhouse (16 February 1905 – 7 September 1985) was an English art historian and museum director who specialised in Roman baroque and English painting. He was Director of the National Galleries of Scotland (1949–52) and held the Barber chair at Birmingham University until his official retirement in 1970.

== Early life and career ==
Waterhouse was born in Epsom in Surrey. His father was the architect Percy Leslie Waterhouse, through whom he possessed the means to pursue a largely independent career. His fellow student at Marlborough College was Anthony Blunt, with whom he continued a lifelong professional friendship. He won a scholarship New College, Oxford and in 1925 he achieved a first in classical honour moderations. He graduated with a second class degree in 1927 and then went to Princeton University as a Commonwealth Fund Fellow. He studied at Princeton with Frank Jewett Mather and received a fellowship to study El Greco in Spain. He returned to London 1929 to take up an Assistant Keeper's post at the National Gallery, London, under its Keepers, C. H. Collins Baker and H. Isherwood Kay. He stayed at the National Gallery for four years, but resigned in 1933 because of the amateurish approach of his colleagues.

He then joined the British School in Rome as librarian until 1936, working on the combination of connoisseurship and archival material that resulted in Roman Baroque Painting (1937), on the strength of which he was elected a Fellow of Magdalen College, Oxford (1938–47) and prepared the catalog for a Royal Academy exhibition, 17th-Century Art in Europe.

He was holidaying in Athens when WWII broke out. He stayed in Greece, working as a cartographer for the British military attaché. He was then commissioned into the Intelligence Corps in Cairo. In September 1944 Waterhouse was selected for service with the British MFAA by Monuments Man Lt. Col. Geoffrey Webb, MFAA Director for the British Zone.

Waterhouse was among the first Monuments Men to investigate Holland, inspecting churches, museums and monuments. While looking at the restitution of stolen painting, he realised that a painting acquired by the Boymans Museum in Rotterdam – Supper at Emmaus, attributed to Vermeer – was a fake. Further investigations by the Monuments Men concluded that another painting attributed to Vermeer, Christ with the Woman Taken in Adultery, owned by Hermann Goering was also a fake. As a result, one of the most accomplished forgers of the 20th century, Han van Meegeren was exposed in 1945.

== Academic career ==
After the war, Waterhouse briefly served as editor to The Burlington Magazine where he was soon succeeded by Benedict Nicolson and began his academic career at Manchester University, 1947–48 and Director of the National Galleries of Scotland, Edinburgh (1949–52). In 1952, he was appointed Barber Professor of Fine Art, Birmingham University and director of its Barber Institute of Fine Arts, staying at Birmingham for 18 years. He also lectured at Oxford University, Williams College, and the University of Pittsburgh during this time. In 1970, he moved to the US to take up the position of director at the Yale Center for British Arts. In 1974, he became the Kress Professor in Residence at the National Gallery of Art in Washington, D.C. He also found time to act as an advisor to the J. Paul Getty Trust. Nikolaus Pevsner asked him to write a volume for the projected Pelican History of Art; his Painting in Britain, 1530-1790 was its first volume.

In 1970, Waterhouse became the Director of the newly established Paul Mellon Centre for Studies in British Art. On taking up the post he brought with him his extensive archive of annotated photographs and associated documentation of British art which were formally donated to the Centre on Waterhouse's death in 1985. The material includes a series of general English sale catalogues running from 1896 to 1940 (formerly belonging to William Roberts); Waterhouse's annotated copy of Graves and Cronin's catalogue of Reynolds paintings and a large collection of annotated photographs of British paintings.

He was knighted in 1975. His reaction was ' I was surprised, slightly amused, but on the whole not displeased.'

In recalling his friendship of over 40 years with Ellis Waterhouse, Cecil Gould stated that he was 'a most remarkable man, with a ringing, sardonic, slightly nasal voice, with a mischievous glint behind the spectacles, exquisite handwriting, underlying kindness, accessibility to young scholars and open handed willingness to share his results with them and an astonishing industry which continued almost to the day of his death'.

Photographs by Sir Ellis Kirkham Waterhouse are held at the Conway Library in the Courtauld, London, and are being digitised.

== Personal life ==
Waterhouse married Helen Thomas, an archaeologist of ancient Greece whom he had met during the war in Athens, where she was connected with the British School of Archaeology in 1949; they had two daughters.

In 1937, Waterhouse commissioned the modernist house Overshot built by Samuel and Harding of the Tecton Group in Oxford. It was his family home to which he returned between foreign assignments.

He died at home, suddenly, of a heart attack in 1985. His unusually extensive personal library and annotated photograph collection were sold to help in the initial formation of the Getty Research Institute, Los Angeles.

== Selected publications ==
Much of Waterhouse's wide-ranging information is buried in brief articles, often in obscure publications. He edited The Dictionary of 16th & 17th century British Painters 1988 and The Dictionary of British 18th Century Painters in Oils and Crayons 1981; only his major books are listed here.

- Baroque Painting in Rome: the Seventeenth Century. (London: Macmillan, 1937);
- Reynolds. (London) 1941;
- Titian's Diana and Actaeon. (Oxford University Press 1952);
- Painting in Britain, 1530–1790. (in series Pelican History of Art) (Baltimore: Penguin, then Yale University Press) 1953, rev. ed 1978; Michael Kitson contributed an introduction and brief sketch of Waterhouse's career to the 5th edition, 1994.
- Gainsborough. (London: E. Hulton, 1958);
- Italian Baroque Painting. (London: Phaidon Press Ltd) 1962;
- Three Decades of British Art, 1740–1770 (The Jayne Lectures for 1964) (Philadelphia: American Philosophical Society) 1965;
- Roman Baroque Painting: a List of the Principal Painters and their Works In and Around Rome. (Oxford: Phaidon, 1976).
- Paintings from Venice for seventeenth century England: some records of a forgotten transaction, Italian Studies, vol vii (1952)
