= Richard Ettinghausen =

German art historian

- Born: February 5, 1906; Frankfurt am Main, German Empire
- Died: April 2, 1979 (aged 73); Mercer, New Jersey, U.S.
- Known for: Chief Curator of the Freer Gallery; founding the Kevorkian Center
- Spouse: Elisabeth Sgalitzer
- Awards: Pour le Mérite (1976); American Academy of Arts and Sciences (1974)

Academic background
- Education: University of Frankfurt

Academic work
- Discipline: Art history
- Sub-discipline: Islamic art
- Institutions: Freer Gallery of Art; Metropolitan Museum of Art; New York University; University of Michigan

Richard Ettinghausen (February 5, 1906 – April 2, 1979) was a German-American historian of Islamic art and chief curator of the Freer Gallery.

== Education ==
Ettinghausen was born in Frankfurt am Main, Germany. There, he would receive his Ph.D. from the University of Frankfurt in 1931 in Islamic history and art history.

== Career ==
From 1929 to 1931, he worked on the Islamic collection of the Kaiser Friedrich Museum in Berlin under the direction of Ernst Kühnel and the collector/archaeologist Friedrich Sarre.

In 1934, due to the rise of the Nazis, he immigrated first to Great Britain and then to the United States, where he joined the staff of Arthur Upham Pope at the Institute of Persian Art and Archaeology in New York. From 1937 to 1938, he taught his first class at the Institute of Fine Art, New York University. In 1938 he was appointed an associate professor at the University of Michigan.

In 1944, Ettinghausen left Michigan to join the Freer Gallery. The following year he married the art historian Elisabeth Sgalitzer. He also lectured at Princeton University. In 1961 he was appointed chief curator of the Freer. During his tenure at the Freer, he built the collection into one of the finest collections on Islamic art in the world. He oversaw both the Ars Islamica and Ars Orientalis, while at Freer. He wrote a book "Arab Painting: Treasures of Asia, Vol IV" published by Editions d'Art Albert Skira, Geneva in 1962.

In 1966, Ettinghausen left the Freer to become Hagop Kevorkian Professor of Islamic Art at the Institute of Fine Art, New York University. Together with the Middle East historian R. Bayly Winder he founded the Kevorkian Center the same year at NYU.

Three years later, he also became the Consultative Chairman of the Islamic Department of the Metropolitan Museum of Art. At the Metropolitan, he was instrumental in installing the galleries to their sensitive arrangement. His text, with Oleg Grabar, The Art and Architecture of Islam 650-1250 in the Pelican History of Art series, appeared posthumously in 1987.

Ettinghausen was elected to the American Academy of Arts and Sciences in 1974 and the American Philosophical Society in 1976. That same year, he was awarded the Pour le Merite by the German government.

Both a Jew and an avid Islamicist, his ties to Israel found expression in his promotion of the establishment of a museum for Islamic art in Jerusalem.

Ettinghausen died of cancer in Mercer, New Jersey on 2 April 1979. The library in the Kevorkian Center is named in his honor.

== Posthumous ==
After his death, Sultan bin Muhammad Al-Qasimi acquired Ettinghausen's private library. These works were then donated to the newly built House of Wisdom in Sharjah.

== See also ==
- Islamic art
- Madiha Omar

== Bibliography ==
- Kleinbauer, W. Eugene. Modern Perspectives in Western Art History: An Anthology of 20th-Century Writings on the Visual Arts. New York: Holt, Rinehart and Winston, 1971, p. 89
- Porada, Edith. "Richard Ettinghausen." Yearbook of the American Philosophical Society 1979 pp. 58–61
- Cook, Joan. "Richard Ettinghausen, Teacher, A Leading Islamic Art Authority, Planned Turkish Exhibition, Taught at Princeton." New York Times April 3, 1979, p. C18
- Grabar, Oleg (1979). "Richard Ettinghausen". Artibus Asiae. 41 (4): 281–284.
