= Where Heaven and Earth Meet =

2009 book on Jerusalem's Sacred Esplanade

- Editors: Oleg Grabar; Benjamin Z. Kedar
- Language: English
- Publisher: University of Texas Press
- Publication date: 2009
- Publication place: United States
- ISBN: 9780292722729

Where Heaven and Earth Meet: Jerusalem's Sacred Esplanade is a 2009 interdisciplinary book concerning the history of the Temple Mount (referred to as al-Haram al-Sharif in Islam) written from an interfaith perspective.

== Composition ==
The subject matter of the book is the esplanade in Jerusalem "known to Jews as the Temple Mount and to Muslims as al-Haram al-Sharif, or the Noble Sanctuary".

The book was edited by Oleg Grabar, the French art historian, archeologist and Harvard professor, and Benjamin Z. Kedar, the Israeli professor emeritus of history and vice-president of the Israel Academy of Sciences and Humanities at the Hebrew University of Jerusalem. It was published by the University of Texas Press in Austin, Texas.

The book was composed by means of a joint undertaking by 21 Jewish, Muslim and Christian scholars from the Hebrew University of Jerusalem, Al Quds University and the Center for Jerusalem Studies, and the École biblique et archéologique française de Jérusalem under the sponsorship of Israeli, Palestinian and Dominican Catholic institutions in Jerusalem.

Over the course of twenty or so chapters in the form of chronologically ordered interdisciplinary essays – taking in history, archaeology, biblical and Islamic studies, geography, art, architecture and religion – the books narrates the transformation of the site and the stories around it over the ages, from the first temple period through to the present-day contestation of the space between Arabs and Israelis.

Included among the contributors was Sari Nusseibeh, president of Al-Quds University and "a well-known Palestinian personality" and Mustafa Abu Sway, director of the institution's Islamic Research Center.

Zvi Zameret, director of Israeli research institute Yad Ben Zvi, one of the project's sponsors, said: "We took on a complicated challenge" tackling one of "the most sensitive subject in the world."

== Conception ==
The book was formulated in the aftermath of Ariel Sharon's 2000 visit to the site with a heavy police presence. The act, which sparked protests and riots, was one of the triggers for the Second Intifada.

The work introduces the term "Sacred Esplanade" as a politically neutral wording "for the open space where the Dome of the Rock, the Al-Aqsa Mosque, and the walls of the Jewish Temple are located", otherwise known in its totality as al-Haram al-Sharif or the Temple Mount. Given the sensitive nature of the book, The New York Times noted that the wording "required exceptional tact" from the co-editors, and it was Kedar that came up with the descriptive phrase "sacred esplanade", which, he noted, was a "compromise" that "should be acceptable to all".

In a sign of the tensions at play, as the book was in the process of going to press the board of Al-Quds University boycotted Israeli academic institutions in protest at Israel's policies and the stalling of peace, though projects that were already under way were not affected, and the Palestinian chapters of this work had long since been submitted. Ultimately published amid both Palestinian pushback against Jewish claims of attachment to the site and persistent encroachment on the space by radical Jewish groups, the aim of the book is to eliminate the inconsiderateness that results from a lack of understanding of the topic or as Kedar has stated: "It is a call for mutual tolerance, acceptance and understanding."

== Reception ==
In a review by John Day, Professor of Old Testament Studies at Oxford University, the work is described as "a comprehensive history of what is commonly known to Jews as the Temple Mount and to Muslims as the Haram al-Sharif (the Noble Sanctuary)".

Jacqueline Swansinger, a professor of History department at the State University of New York at Fredonia, called it "a worthy, if conspicuously politically neutral, work of perception, historical and artistic breadth" and "a book of surprising power and utility".
