= John Harvey (architectural historian) =

English architectural historian (1911–1997)

- John Hooper Harvey in 1978
- Born: 25 May 1911; London, England, United Kingdom
- Died: 18 November 1997 (aged 86); Frome, England, United Kingdom
- Education: St John's School, Leatherhead; Regent Street Polytechnic
- Occupation: Architectural historian
- Political party: Imperial Fascist League
- Movement: Fascism, Nordicism

John Hooper Harvey FSA (25 May 1911 – 18 November 1997) was an English architectural historian, who specialised in writing on English Gothic architecture and architects. Art historian Paul Crossley described him as "the most prolific and arguably the most influential writer on Gothic architecture in the post-war years".

Harvey made extensive use of archival sources, and is particularly remembered for having – through his study of Henry Yevele (1944), and his biographical dictionary of English Mediaeval Architects (1954) – helped dispel the myth that the architects of medieval buildings were anonymous figures of whom little could be discovered. He also published more generally on England in the Late Middle Ages, and was a pioneer in the field of garden history.

In the 1930s, Harvey was a member of the Imperial Fascist League and a regular contributor to their newspaper, The Fascist.

== Early life ==
Harvey was born in London, the only child of William Harvey (1883–1962), architect, and his wife, Alice née Wilcox (1874–1958). He was educated at St John's School, Leatherhead, after which, in 1928, he joined the architectural practice of Sir Herbert Baker. While in Baker's office he studied architecture at the Regent Street Polytechnic. From 1933 to 1935 he travelled with his father in Palestine, helping survey ancient buildings. In 1936 he took a job with the Office of Works.

== Politics and World War II ==
In 1930 Harvey joined the far-right and antisemitic Imperial Fascist League (IFL), and for a while was active in the associated Nordic League. He had to curtail his activities when he joined the Office of Works, but he continued to be peripherally involved and to pay his subscriptions to the IFL until 1940. He was a frequent contributor to the IFL's newspaper, The Fascist, and wrote a monthly column about Nordicism and Nordic history. Harvey's worldview and writings were suffused with antisemitism; he praised Edward I for the expulsion of the Jews from England in 1290 and criticised Oliver Cromwell for the resettlement of the Jews in England which in his view led to "three centuries of hidden decay, at first slow and camouflaged by great commercial success; now felt as a choking grip on the England we love".

On the outbreak of World War II he was placed on a "Suspect List" by MI5. In 1942 his application, as a conscientious objector, for exemption from military service having been denied, he refused to submit to a medical examination, as a necessary preliminary to call-up, and was sentenced to 12 months' imprisonment. The sentence qualified him to make a fresh application to the Appellate Tribunal for Conscientious Objectors, who now placed him on the Register of Conscientious Objectors, and recommended to the Home Secretary his immediate release from prison, which recommendation was put into effect.

He was not re-employed by the Ministry of Works. (Note: The Office of Works was transformed into the Ministry of Works and Buildings in 1940.) By 1943 he was employed as an assistant to his father, who worked as a Panel Architect for the Ministry of Works' Salvage Scheme. His father was responsible for historic buildings in an area of north-central Surrey. Harvey's employment involved identifying and visiting buildings of historic interest in the area, in order that the buildings could be added to the Ministry lists of historic buildings deserving attention and first aid repairs in case of bomb damage.

== Post-war career ==
In 1947 Harvey was appointed consultant architect (for conservation matters) to Winchester College, a post he retained until 1964. In 1950 he became lecturer in conservation at the Bartlett School of Architecture at University College London, where he remained until 1959. These were part-time posts, allowing him to devote much of his time to writing.

He had begun to publish articles on medieval architecture in 1936, and his prodigious stream of publications, including numerous books, continued in the post-war years. His magisterial biographical dictionary of English Mediaeval Architects, the first edition of which appeared in 1954, contained 1,300 entries, and has been described as "a feat of titanic proportions". A central theme of many of his publications was the artistic importance of England and of the English national style in the fourteenth and fifteenth centuries. More particularly, he regarded Perpendicular Gothic (a style unique to England) as "the quintessential national style", and a manifestation of the English national character. Harvey resented the modern world, and his study of the Middle Ages was through the lens of seeing the 14th and 15th centuries as a golden age of England's history. Though he acknowledged the contribution of Jewish architects in his writings on Spanish architectural history, he omitted their contribution to the architecture of England in his 1974 book Cathedrals of England and Wales.

Paul Crossley considers that "his Neo-Romantic sensibilities propelled him beyond romanticism into real historical understanding, inspired by a tenacious curiosity for fact, and based on a phenomenal learning". Elsewhere, Crossley compares Harvey's Gothic World (1950) with Nikolaus Pevsner's Outline of European Architecture (1942) and finds that the contrast "could not have been more telling: Harvey patiently accumulating masses of detailed research to fill his survey with lists of empirical data, Pevsner subsuming detail into the broad sweep of a pan-European synthesis". Photographs attributed to John Harvey are held in the Conway Library at The Courtauld Institute of Art whose archive, of primarily architectural images, is being digitised under the wider Courtauld Connects project.

In 1963 Harvey moved to York, where he was employed until 1970 as an investigator and editor (again on a part-time basis) by the Royal Commission on the Historical Monuments of England. In 1975 he moved to Frome, Somerset. It was from this time that he became increasingly interested in garden history, and a prominent figure in the Garden History Society.

== Prejudices ==
Harvey's conviction of the importance and uniqueness of the English Gothic style meant that in much of his writing, in Crossley's view, "his nationalism continued to distort his judgement". Thus, in his well-received study of The Perpendicular Style (1978), he refused to acknowledge the influence of the French Rayonnant style on English perpendicular architecture, and he excluded Tudor perpendicular buildings from consideration on the grounds that the "distinctive nationalism" of the English style had been compromised in this period by the inclusion of minor motifs of exotic and foreign origin.

He successfully distanced himself in the post-war period from his earlier political affiliations, but a short passage in his successful and frequently reprinted book The Plantagenets (originally published 1948), in which he gave credence to stories of Jewish ritual murder, and praised the "statesmanship" of Edward I in expelling the Jews from England in 1290, continued to cause offence. He refused to amend the passage, and the publishers (Fontana) eventually allowed the book to go out of print in the mid-1980s.

== Institutional affiliations and awards ==
Harvey was elected a fellow of the Society of Genealogists in 1939, the Royal Society of Literature in 1945, and the Society of Antiquaries of London in 1949. He served on the Council of the Ancient Monuments Society for some 30 years from 1960; and as President of the Garden History Society from 1982 to 1985. The University of York awarded him an honorary doctorate in 1976.

For his 70th birthday in 1981, rather than presenting him with the customary scholarly Festschrift, Harvey's friends and admirers helped fund the second edition of his English Mediaeval Architects (published 1984; further revised 1987).

== Personal life ==
Harvey married (Sarah) Cordelia Story (1903–1996) in 1934. They had two sons, Richard (b. 1938) and Charles (1940–2000); and one daughter, Eleanour (b. 1945).

== Principal publications ==
- The Heritage of Britain (1941; second edition 1943)
- Henry Yevele: The Life of an English Architect (1944; second edition 1946)
- Gothic England: A Survey of National Culture, 1300–1550 (1947)
- The Plantagenets: 1154–1485 (1948)
- Tudor Architecture (1949)
- The Gothic World (1950)
- The English Cathedrals (1950)
- English Cathedrals: A Reader's Guide
- English Mediaeval Architects: A Biographical Dictionary Down to 1550, with contributions by Arthur Oswald (1954; revised editions 1984 and 1987)
- Itineraries [of] William Worcestre (editor and translator) (1969)
- The Master Builders: Architecture in the Middle Ages (1971)
- The Mediaeval Architect (1972)
- Conservation of Buildings (1972)
- Early Gardening Catalogues (1972)
- Cathedrals of England and Wales (1974)
- Sources for the History of Houses (1974)
- Early Nurserymen (1974)
- Mediaeval Craftsmen (1975)
- The Black Prince and his Age (1976)
- The Perpendicular Style, 1330–1485 (1978)
- Mediaeval Gardens (1981)
- The Availability of Hardy Plants of the Late Eighteenth Century (1988)

Fuller lists of Harvey's many publications appear in:

- Colchester, L. S. (1981). "Bibliography of John H. Harvey". Transactions of the Ancient Monuments Society. n.s. 25: 47–52.
- Colchester, L. S. (1982). "Bibliography of John H. Harvey: additions". Transactions of the Ancient Monuments Society. n.s. 26: 249–52.
- "Published writings by John Hooper Harvey (1911–97) on garden history and related topics". Garden History. 26: 102–5. 1998.

== Bibliography ==
- Brock, David (2004). "Harvey, John Hooper (1911–1997)". Oxford Dictionary of National Biography (online ed.). Oxford University Press. doi:10.1093/ref:odnb/68424. (Subscription, Wikipedia Library access or UK public library membership required.)
- Crossley, Paul (2006). "Anglia Perdita: English medieval architecture and neo-romanticism". In L'Engle, Susan; Guest, Gerald B. (eds.). Tributes to Jonathan J. G. Alexander: the making and meaning of illuminated medieval & Renaissance manuscripts, art & architecture. London: Harvey Miller. pp. 471–85. ISBN 9781872501475.
- Macklin, Graham (2008). "The two lives of John Hooper Harvey". Patterns of Prejudice. 42 (2): 167–90. doi:10.1080/00313220801996030. S2CID 144814552.
- Marks, Richard (2012). "The Englishness of English Gothic art?". Studies in the Art and Imagery of the Middle Ages. London: Pindar Press. pp. 1–32. ISBN 978-1-904597-38-4.
