= Peter Kidson =

English art historian (1925–2019)

Professor Peter Kidson
- Born: 1925

Academic background
- Education: University of Cambridge; The Courtauld Institute of Art

Academic work
- Discipline: History of Art
- Sub-discipline: Medieval architecture

Peter Kidson (23 August 1925 – 10 February 2019) was a British emeritus professor and honorary fellow at the Courtauld Institute of Art, where he lectured on medieval architecture until 1990. In his obituary in The Telegraph, he was described as “the most influential historian of medieval architecture of his generation in the English-speaking world”.

== Education ==
Kidson spent 1943 to 1946 on a scholarship to the University of Cambridge (interrupted by WW2 when he was conscripted into the Royal Navy), and graduated in 1950 with a Bachelor of Arts degree. From 1950 to 1959, he studied at the Courtauld (MA and PhD) alongside Brian Sewell; their tutors included Anthony Blunt, on whom Kidson wrote a memoir for The British Academy in 2016.

== Career ==
Kidson taught at the Courtauld, also as a visiting lecturer at Cambridge and the University of East Anglia, and as a visiting professor at the University of Victoria, British Columbia in 1972. He was appointed full lecturer at the Courtauld in 1967, where he remained until his retirement as Professor of Medieval Architecture in 1990.

== Honours ==
- 1961 – Elected Fellow of the Society of Antiquaries of London
- 1977 – Appointed Royal Commissioner
- 1985–1987 – Chairman of the Royal Commission's Architectural Committee
- 1982 – Rhind Lecturer of the Society of Antiquaries of Scotland, and member of the British Academy Committee for postgraduate awards in the humanities
- 1988 – awarded a personal chair by London University

Upon retirement Kidson became emeritus professor and Honorary Fellow of the Courtauld Institute of Art.

== Writings ==
- Sculpture at Chartres, 1958, with photography by Ursula Pariser, published by Alec Tiranti.
- A History of English Architecture. Part I, 1962, George G. Harrap.
- A History of English Architecture, 1965, revised edition (with Peter Murray, and Paul Thompson), Penguin Books.
- The Medieval World, 1967, Paul Hamlyn.
- Salisbury Cathedral: Perspectives On The Architectural History, with Thomas Cocke, 1993, HMSO.
- Courtauld Institute Illustration Archives: Archive 1: Cathedrals & Monastic Buildings In The British Isles: Part 3 Lincoln: St Hugh's Choir & Transepts, 1977, Harvey Miller.

== Books on Peter Kidson ==
- Medieval architecture and its intellectual context: Studies in honour of Peter Kidson, 1990, edd. Eric Fernie and Paul Crossley, Hambledon.

=== Citations in academic writings ===
- Geometrical Objects: Architecture and the Mathematical Sciences 1400–1800, 2014, ed. A. Gerbino, Springer.

== Contributions ==
Photographs contributed by Peter Kidson to the Conway Library are currently (2020) being digitised by the Courtauld Institute of Art, as part of the Courtauld Connects project.
