= Charles Reginald Dodwell =

British art historian (1922–1994)

Charles Reginald Dodwell (3 February 1922 – 22 April 1994) was a British art historian who specialized in the period covering the years 800–1200.

== Early life ==
Dodwell was born in Cheltenham on 3 February 1922. He was admitted to Gonville and Caius College, Cambridge, where he specialized in history. His academic studies were interrupted by the outbreak of World War II. He served in the Royal Navy from 1941 to 1945, although he suffered from sea-sickness. Initially serving as a mine-sweeper in the British home waters, he later took part in both the Allied invasion of Sicily and the Normandy landings.

== Academic career ==
After the end of the war, Dodwell returned to Cambridge to complete his studies under Philip Grierson. He specialized in medieval art history, particularly in illuminated manuscripts. In 1949, he was made a senior research fellow of the Warburg Institute, which had been relocated a few years earlier from Hamburg to London. In 1953, he was chosen by Archbishop Geoffrey Fisher for the prestigious position of librarian-archivist of Lambeth Palace Library, despite having no formal librarian's qualifications. In this position, Dodwell assisted with the careful transfer of the contents of the library (heavily damaged during the war) to proper repositories. In 1958, he became a lecturer and librarian at Trinity College, Cambridge, and in 1966 he obtained a professorship at Manchester University. He held this position for 23 years. He was elected a Fellow of the British Academy in 1973.

During his long career, Dodwell published several notable works. In 1954 he published The Canterbury School of Illumination 1066–1200, considered to be the first significant post-war publication on English medieval art. In another publication, he advanced the view (not widely accepted by other scholars) that the Reichenau manuscripts were actually created at Trier and Lorsch.

== Later life ==
In 1988, Dodwell suffered a stroke that left him partially blind. Despite his declining health, he continued in active research and publication. He resigned his position as professor in 1989, and with his wife moved to Taunton, where he remained until his death in 1994. His final work, Anglo-Saxon Gestures and the Roman Stage, was published posthumously. His friends and colleagues published Medieval Art: Recent Perspectives as a memorial to Dodwell, including recognition of his work in the restoration of the Lambeth Palace Library during his tenure there.
