= Oleg Grabar =

French-born American art historian (1929–2011)

Oleg Grabar (November 3, 1929 – January 8, 2011) was a French-born art historian and archeologist, who spent most of his career in the United States, as a leading figure in the field of Islamic art and architecture in the Western academe.

== Academic career ==
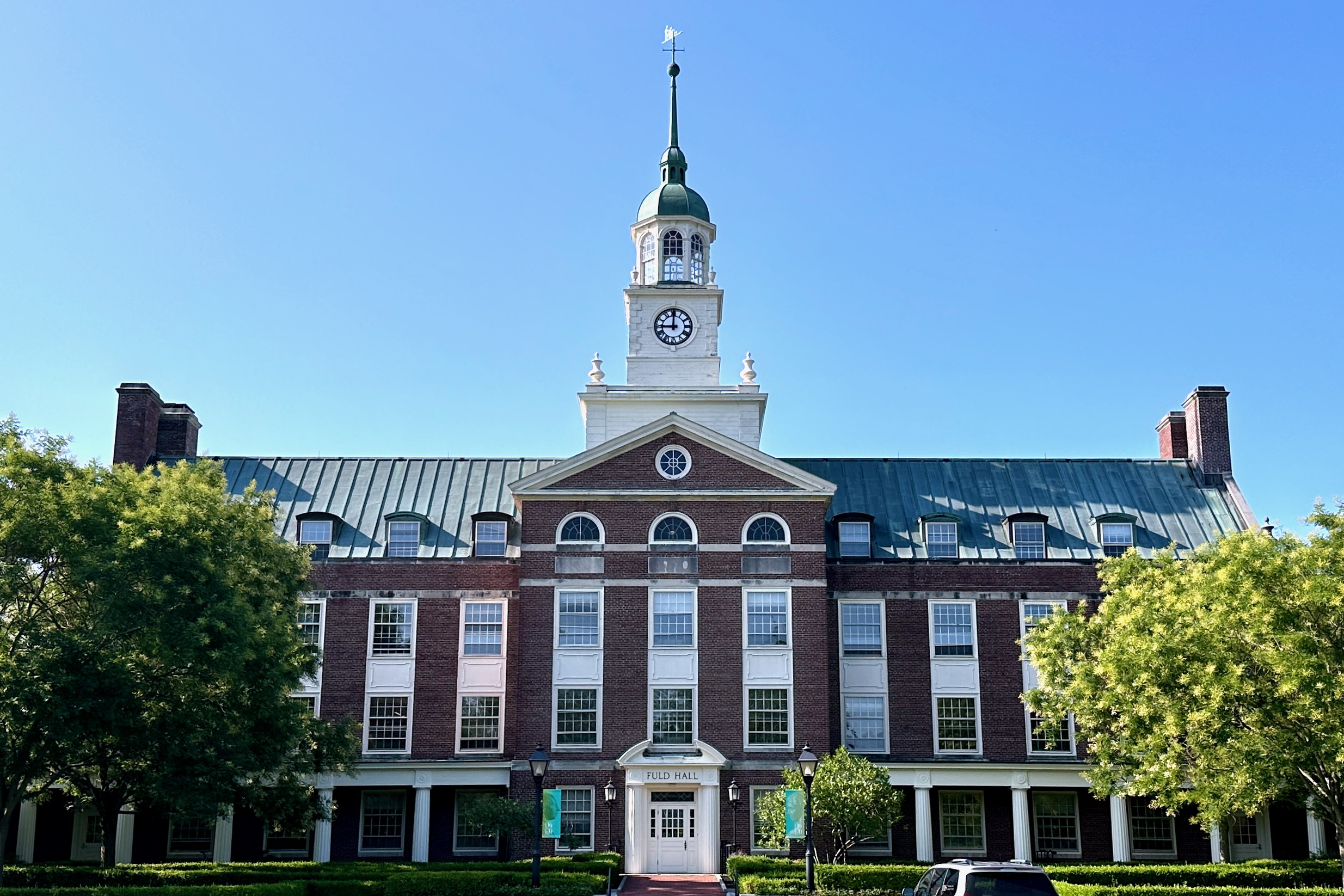
Institute for Advanced Study in Princeton, New Jersey

Oleg Grabar was the son of André Grabar; his grandmother was Baroness Elisabeth de Prittwitz (1866-1924), an artist of German origin. He attended the University of Paris, where he studied ancient, medieval, and modern history, before moving to the US in 1948. He completed degrees from both Harvard and the University of Paris in 1950. In 1955, he obtained a PhD from Princeton University.

He served on the faculty of the University of Michigan in 1954–69, before moving to Harvard University as a full professor. In 1980, Grabar became Harvard's first Aga Khan Professor of Islamic art and architecture. He was a founding editor of the journal Muqarnas in 1983. He became emeritus from Harvard in 1990, and then joined the School of Historical Studies at the Institute for Advanced Study, becoming emeritus there in 1998.

According to the President of the Historians of Islamic Art Association, "Grabar transformed the fields of Islamic art, architecture and archaeology through his myriad scholarly works, general textbooks, and through training and inspiring many generations of undergraduate and graduate students at the University of Michigan and at Harvard."

== Research ==
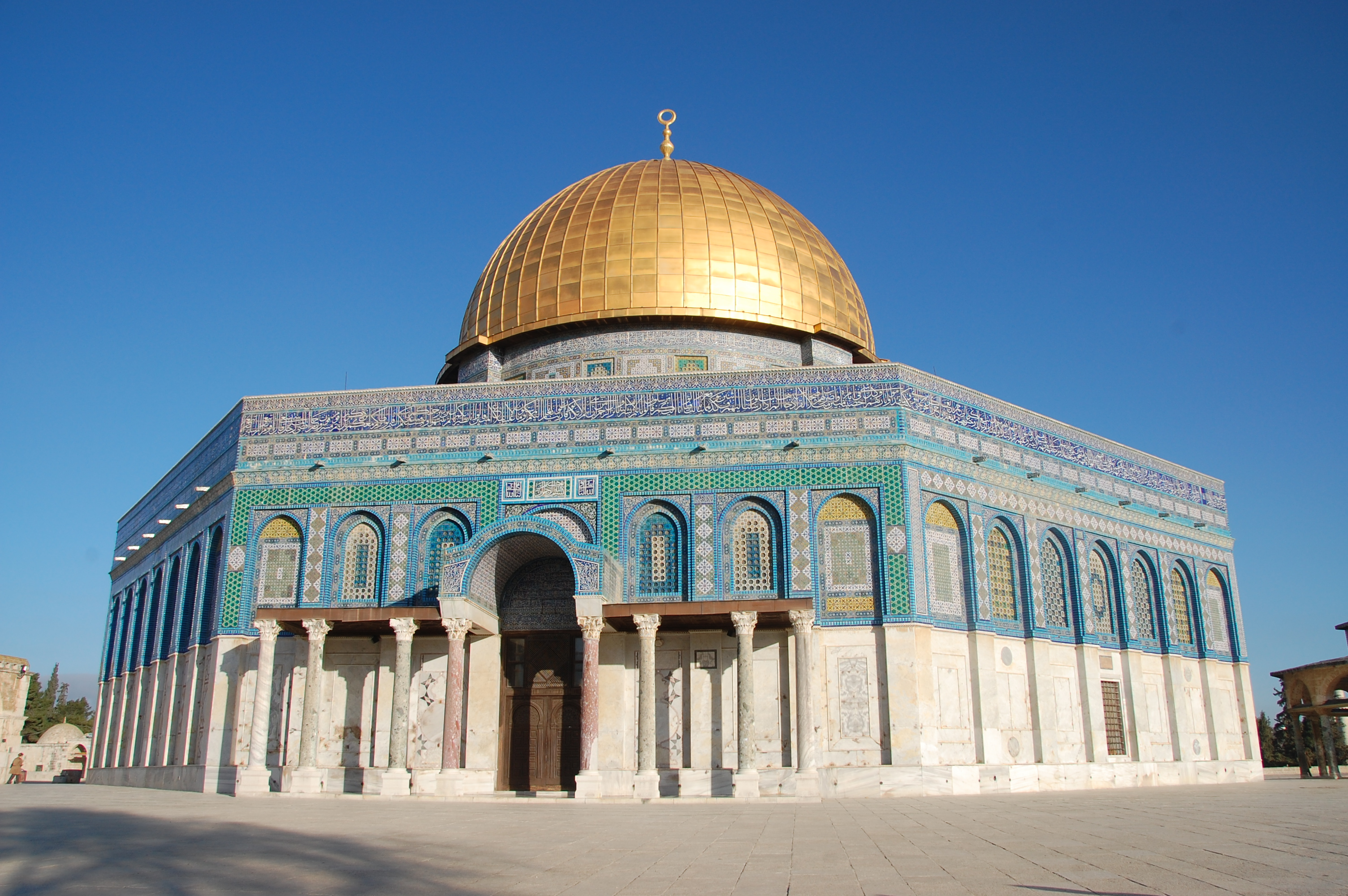
Dome of the Rock in the Old City of Jerusalem

Grabar's archeological and scholarly research covered a wide range of Islamic studies across Africa, the Middle East, and Muslim Asia.

Early in his career, Grabar spent two years (1953 and 1960–1961) at the American School of Oriental Research in Jordanian-ruled East Jerusalem. From 1964 to 1972, he directed excavations on a Medieval Islamic town at Qasr al-Hayr al-Sharqi, Syria, work later described in a two-volume book he coauthored, City in the Desert, Qasr al-Hayr East. Other major books in English include The Shape of the Holy (Princeton, 1996), The Mediation of Ornament (Princeton, 1992), The Great Mosque of Isfahan (NYU, 1990), and The Formation of Islamic Art (Yale, 1973).

Oleg Grabar also did scholarly work on the Persian miniature. With Sheila Blair, he coauthored an illustrated study of a major Shahnameh manuscript, Epic Images and Contemporary History: The Illustrations of the Great Mongol Shahnama (Chicago, 1980). He was also a noted scholar of the Dome of the Rock, after the appearance of his article "The Umayyad Dome of the Rock in Jerusalem." His work Penser l'art islamique : une esthétique de l'ornement denotes also reflections on the nature of Islamic art.

== Personal life ==
Grabar was the son of the renowned Byzantinist André Grabar. Oleg Grabar and his wife Terry, a retired English professor, were married for 59 years. They had two children, Nicolas and Anne Louise, and three grandchildren, Henry, Olivia, and Margaret.

== Honors ==
Grabar received many honors during his lifetime, including the Charles Lang Freer Medal in 2001 and, in 2010, the Chairman's Award at the Aga Khan Award for Architecture ceremony in Doha, where he made what was perhaps his last public speech. He was a member of both the American Academy of Arts and Sciences and the American Philosophical Society.

== Selected works ==
In a statistical overview derived from writings by and about Oleg Grabar, OCLC/WorldCat encompasses roughly 200+ works in 500+ publications in 13 languages and 15,000+ library holdings.

- City in the Desert with Renata Holod, James Knustad, and William Trousdale, Harvard University Press, (1978) ISBN 9780674131958
- Epic Images and Contemporary History: The Illustrations of the Great Mongol Shahnama (University of Chicago Press, 1982) ISBN 9780226305851
- The Mediation of Ornament (1992, 2023) ISBN 9780691252766
- The Shape of the Holy: Early Islamic Jerusalem (Princeton University Press, 1996) ISBN 9780691036533
- Late Antiquity: A Guide to the Post-Classical World, with Glen Bowersock and Peter Brown, Harvard University Press, (1999)
- The Art and Architecture of Islam 650–1250, with Richard Ettinghausen and Marilyn Jenkins-Madina, Pelican History of Art, (2001)
- Late Antiquity: A Guide to the Postclassical World edited with G. W. Bowersock, Peter Brown, Harvard University Press, (2001) ISBN 9780674511736
- Mostly Miniatures: An Introduction to Persian Painting (Princeton University Press, 2002) ISBN 9780691049410
- Islamic visual culture, 1100–1800, Ashgate, (2006) ISBN 9780860789222
- The Dome of the Rock, Harvard University Press, (2006) ISBN 9780674023130
- "The Haram Al-Sharif: An Essay in Interpretation," BRIIFS vol. 2 no 2 (Autumn 2000).
- Constructing the Study of Islamic Art, 83 collected articles (4 vols, 2005–06)
  - Volume I: Early Islamic Art, 650–1100
  - Volume II: Islamic Visual Culture, 1100–1800
  - Volume III: Islamic Art and Beyond ISBN 9780860789260
  - Volume IV: Jerusalem
- Penser l'art islamique: Une esthétique de l'ornement (1996) ISBN 9782226084514

== See also ==
- Excavations at the Temple Mount
- Where Heaven and Earth Meet: Jerusalem's Sacred Esplanade
