= Jennifer Montagu =

British art historian

Jennifer Iris Rachel Montagu CBE LVO FBA FSA (born 20 March 1931) is a British art historian with emphasis in the study of Italian Baroque sculpture.

== Early life ==
Montagu is a daughter of Ewen Montagu, a British judge, writer and Naval intelligence officer, and granddaughter of painter Solomon J. Solomon.

She was educated at Brearley School, New York, Benenden School, Kent, and Lady Margaret Hall, Oxford, where she gained a BA in PPE, then studied under Ernst Gombrich at the Warburg Institute, London, where she received her PhD degree.

== Career ==
Montagu lectured in History of Art at Reading University 1958–64, then was assistant Curator 1964–71, and Curator 1971–91, of the Photographic Collection at the Warburg Institute. She was Slade Professor of Fine Art and fellow of Jesus College, Cambridge, 1980–81. She was Andrew W. Mellon Lecturer at the National Gallery of Art, Washington, in 1991 and Invited Professor at the Collège de France, Paris in 1994. She was a trustee of the Wallace Collection, 1989–2001 and of the British Museum,1994–2001.

== Publications ==
- Bronzes, Weidenfeld and Nicolson, London, 1963. ISBN 0706400372
- Alessandro Algardi, Yale University Press 1985. ISBN 0300031734
- Roman Baroque Sculpture : The Industry of Art, Yale University Press, 1989. ISBN 0300043929
- The Expression of the Passions, Yale University Press, 1994 (originally presented as the author's doctoral thesis, Warburg Institute, 1959). ISBN 0300058918
- Gold, Silver and Bronze: Metal Sculpture of the Roman Baroque, (A.W. Mellon Lectures in the Fine Arts; Bollingen series 39), Princeton University Press, 1996. ISBN 0691027366

== Honours ==
In 1990, Montagu delivered the annual A. W. Mellon Lectures in the Fine Arts at the National Gallery of Art. Montagu was appointed LVO "for services to the Royal Collection" in 2006 and CBE "for services to Art History" in 2012. She is an honorary fellow of her alma mater, Lady Margaret Hall, Oxford, and of the Warburg Institute. She has been honoured in France as a Chevalier of the Légion d’honneur and a Commander of the Ordre des Arts et des Lettres, and in Italy as an Officer of the Order of Merit of the Italian Republic.
