= Krauthamer =

Krauthamer is a German language surname. Notable people with the name include:

- Barbara Krauthamer (born 1967), American historian
- Mandy Krauthamer Cohen, American physician and Director of the U.S. Centers for Disease Control and Prevention
- Peter A. Krauthamer (born 1957), American judge
