= Margaret Rickert =

Margaret Rickert (May 5, 1888 – 1973) was an American art historian and World War II codebreaker. In 1954, she became the first American and first woman to author a volume in the original series of the Pelican History of Art with her title, Painting in Britain: The Middle Ages. She was the sister of art historian Edith Rickert.

Born in 1888, Richert earned her Ph.D. from the University of Chicago in 1938. Her dissertation was on the reconstruction of an English Carmelite missal from a scrapbook housed in the British Museum. In 1952, she published a book based on this dissertation.

During World War II, Rickert worked as a codebreaker for the U.S. Army Signal Corps in Washington, D.C.

Rickert died in 1973. Her papers are housed at the University of Chicago Library.

== Published works ==
- Rickert, Margaret J, and Philip A. Hanrott. The Reconstructed Carmelite Missal: An English Manuscript of the Late XIV Century in the British Museum (additional 29704-5, 44892). London: Faber and Faber, 1952.
- Rickert, Margaret J. Painting in Britain: The Middle Ages. The Pelican History of Art. London: Penguin Books, 1954 (2nd ed. 1965)
- Rickert, Margaret J. "The So-Called Beaufort Hours and York Psalter", The Burlington Magazine, Vol. 104, No. 711, June 1962.
