= Geoffrey Webb =

British art historian

Geoffrey Fairbank Webb CBE (9 May 1898 – 17 July 1970) was a British art historian, Slade Professor of Fine Art and head of the Monuments and Fine Arts section of the Allied Control Commission during World War II.

== Early life ==
Webb was born in Birkenhead, to John Racker Webb, who worked at the Booth Steamship Company, and his wife Elizabeth Hodgson Fairbank. Webb was the only child of his father's second marriage. Most of his step-brothers and -sisters were old enough to be his uncles and aunts. His mother died when he was fifteen and his father later married again. His closest ties growing up were with his eldest stepsister and her husband.

He was educated at Birkenhead School and in 1917 volunteered to join the Royal Navy as a Seaman until 1919. He went to Magdalene College, Cambridge in 1919 where he read English, and graduated in 1921. Webb also completed a MA here in 1929. Upon moving to London in 1921, Webb befriended members of the avant-garde, including art historian and critic Roger Fry of the Bloomsbury group. His involvement with the Bloomsbury Group inspired Webb to publish several writings on painting, architecture and sculpture. In 1947 he delivered the Henriette Hertz Trust Lecture on Aspects of Arts.

== Career ==
Webb started to write articles on art for the Burlington Magazine. After completing his MA, Webb held a succession of appointments at Cambridge from 1929, including Lecturer in the Mural Department from 1929-1936 and Demonstrator at the School of Architecture in 1933 from which he was promoted to Lecturer which he held until 1948. In 1938, he was awarded the Slade Professor of Fine Art from 1938 - 1941; 1946-1949. At the same time, Webb was a lecturer at the Courtauld Institute of Art between 1934-1937.

When the Second World War broke out, he joined the Navy again, working for Naval Intelligence at the Admiralty. He was then in the historical section of the War Cabinet Office and joined the Monuments, Fine Arts, and Archives program. He was awarded the Medal of Freedom with Bronze Palm in 1947 and a CBE in the 1953 Coronation Honours. Following the German surrender, Webb was named Chief of the MFAA Branch, British Element control Mission, He was integral to the post-war restitution effort in France and Germany. He also helped to expose notorious art forger, Han van Meegeren, after being altered to his deception by “Monuments Man” Major Ellis Waterhouse. As a measure of gratitude for his role in revealing von Meegeren's deception, the Dutch government gifted Webb one of his forgeries, The Procuress. After modern testing, this assessment has now been doubted and it is largely believed that The Procuress is in fact an original Vermeer.

He resumed the Slade professorship in 1948, and then became secretary to the Royal Commission on Historical Monuments. He was also a member of the Royal Fine Arts Commission, and was elected a fellow of the British Academy in 1957. In 1956 he wrote a volume on medieval British architecture for the Pelican History of Art.

== Personal life ==
In 1934 he married Marjorie Isabel Batten, an architectural historian who later devoted her career to English eighteenth-century sculpture.

Webb retired to Solva, Pembrokeshire and died at Ffynone, Swansea.

== Awards/Legacy ==
Webb was awarded the Medal of Freedom with Bronze Palm in 1947 by the United States and a CBE in the 1953 Coronation Honours. In appreciation of his service as a Monuments Officer, the French government awarded Webb the Croix de Guerre and named him an officer of the Legion of Honor.

Photographs contributed by Webb to the Conway Library are currently being digitised by the Courtauld Institute of Art, as part of the Courtauld Connects project.

== Publications ==
- The Complete Works of Sir John Vanbrugh. 4 vols. with Bonamy Dobrée, The Nonesuch Press, 1927–1928
- "Architecture and sculpture" in Roger Fry Georgian Art (1760–1820), B. T. Batsford, 1929
- The Letters and Drawings of Nicholas Hawksmoor Relating to the Building of the Mausoleum at Castle Howard, 1726–1742, Walpole Society 17 (1929)
- Gothic Architecture in England, British Council/Longmans, Green, 1951
- Baroque Art: Annual Lecture on Aspects of Art, Henriette Hertz Trust, 1947. British Academy, 1951
- Architecture in Britain: the Middle Ages, (Pelican History of Art 12), Penguin Books, 1956
