= Ludwig Heinrich Heydenreich =

German art historian

Ludwig Heinrich Heydenreich (born 23 March 1903 in Leipzig; died 14 September 1978 in Munich) was a German art historian specialized in Italian Renaissance art. From 1947 to 1970, he served as director of the Zentralinstitut für Kunstgeschichte, Munich.

== Life and work ==
The son of a German officer, Heydenreich grew up in Dresden. He first studied art history at the University of Berlin, but moved to Hamburg in 1919 in order to study under Erwin Panofsky. In 1929, he wrote a PhD thesis entitled, "Die Sakralbau-Studien Leonardo da Vincis". In Hamburg he also wrote his Habilitationschrift, which was completed in 1934. From 1934 to 1938, he taught art history at the University of Hamburg. In 1941, he took up a chair in art history at the University of Berlin. In 1943 he became director of the Kunsthistorisches Institut, Florence. After the war, he helped found the Zentralinstitut für Kunstgeschichte, a research center for art historians situated in the former Nazi headquarter building in Munich. He was director of this institute until his retirement in 1970.

Together with Ernst Gall and some other art historians, he edited volumes 3-6 of the Reallexikon zur deutschen Kunstgeschichte. He also wrote books on Leonardo da Vinci. His most popular book, co-written with his former student, Wolfgang Lotz is the Pelican History of Art's Architecture in Italy, 1400 to 1600, first published in 1974.

In August 2012, the original manuscript of Panofsky's Habilitationsschrift of 1920 was found under other papers in an old Nazi safe used by Heydenreich in Munich's Zentralinstitut für Kunstgeschichte. It seems as if Heydenreich, from 1946 to 1970, was in the possession of this important manuscript, which was thought to have been lost forever, but possibly never informed Panofsky about this fact. However, according to Willibald Sauerländer, "Panofsky has historically distanced himself from his early writings on Michelangelo, as he tired of the subject ... Perhaps Panofsky didn't care about the whereabouts of his lost work and Heydenreich was not malicious in keeping it a secret ... but questions still remain."

== Works ==
- Leonardo (Berlin: Rembrandt Verlag, 1943).
- Die Sakralbau-Studien Leonardo da Vincis: Untersuchungen zum Thema: Leonardo da Vinci als Architekt (Munich: Fink, 1971).
- Italienische Renaissance: Anfänge und Entfaltung in der Zeit von 1400 bis 1460 (Munich: Beck, 1972).
- Leonardo: The Last Supper (London: Allen Lane, 1974).
- with Wolfgang Lotz, Architecture in Italy, 1400 to 1600 (Pelican History of Art, Harmondsworth: Penguin Books, 1974; repr. New Haven, CT: Yale University Press, 1996).
- Il Rinascimento italiano (Milan: Rizzoli, 1979).
- with Bern Dibner and Ladislao Reti, Leonardo the Inventor (New York: McGraw Hill, 1980).
- Studien zur Architektur der Renaissance: Ausgewählte Aufsätze (Munich: Fink, 1981).
- Leonardo-Studien, ed. Günter Passavant (Munich: Prestel, 1988).
