= Achim Timmermann =

Professor and university program director

- Title: Professor; Director of Medieval and Early Modern Studies

Academic background
- Education: King's College London, The Courtauld Institute of Art

Academic work
- Discipline: History of Art, Architecture, Medieval Studies

Achim Timmermann is a professor, specialising in Medieval and early modern art and architecture. He is Director of Medieval and Early Modern Studies at the University of Michigan, Ann Arbor.

== Education ==
Timmermann attended The Courtauld Institute of Art, University of London between 1988 and 1991, studying for a B.A. in history of art. He completed his M.A. in European literary and historical studies (medieval studies) at King's College, University of London in 1992. Returning to Courtauld the same year, Timmerman began his PhD in history of art and started working on his dissertation Staging the Eucharist: Late Gothic Sacrament Houses in Swabia and the Upper Rhine, with the assistance of his supervisor Paul Crossley.

== Career ==
Following the completion of his Ph.D. in 1996, Timmermann became a research assistant at Courtauld Institute of Art until 1998 and a research scholar in Index of Christian Art at Princeton University between 1997 and 1999. He also acted as a visiting lecturer at Birkbeck, University of London in 1996, at Morley College in 1997 and at Humboldt University of Berlin in 2001. He first became a lecturer in 2002 at University of California, Berkeley, where he taught for one year until moving to Berlin as a member of the faculty at European College of Liberal Arts until 2004.

Between 2004 and 2010, Timmermann was assistant professor for the History of Art Department at the University of Michigan, Ann Arbor then moving on to become associate professor. He became assistant professor for the Taubman College of Architecture and Urban Planning at the University of Michigan, Ann Arbor, in 2006 and associate professor in 2010.

Timmermann served on the editorial board of ArtHist.net, in the role of reviews editor in 2001-2004.

=== Sacrament houses ===
Timmermann developed his arguments on the architectural significance of sacrament houses (sometimes called sacrament towers) from his PhD dissertation. Architect and historian Steven J. Schloeder noted Timmermann's intervention that the politics of the medieval church may be seen in the design of sacrament houses. In his review of Timmermann's work, he summarises his arguments that "anti-Semitism, the Hussite Utraquist controversy (that the Eucharist must be administered under both species), and the later Protestant challenges shaped the display of the Sacrament into grand statements of orthodoxy and ecclesiastical unity".

=== Microarchitecture ===
Timmermann's book, Real Presence: Sacrament Houses and the Body of Christ, c. 1270–1600 (2009) discusses microarchitecture, introducing his intervention "pointing out the close stylistic relation between micro- and macroarchitecture in the thirteenth and fourteenth centuries that distinguished the Gothic phenomenon from previous uses".

Timmermann was subsequently invited to write the “Microarchitecture” entry for the Grove Dictionary of Medieval Art, edited by Colum Hourihane (Oxford: Oxford University Press, 2012); and Oxford Art Online.

Timmermann drew further attention to the importance of microarchitecture such as shrines in Memory and Redemption (2017).

== Bibliography ==
=== Monographs ===
- Memory and Redemption: Public Monuments and the Making of Late Medieval Landscape (Architectura Medii Aevi, 8) (Turnhout: Brepols, 2017)
- Real Presence: Sacrament Houses and the Body of Christ, c. 1270–1600 (Architectura Medii Aevi, 4) ( Turnhout: Brepols, 2009)

=== Edited collections ===
- Edward B Garrison; Giovanni Freni; Achim Timmermann., Italian romanesque panel painting : an illustrated index (Courtauld Institute of Art, London, 1988)
- Opacic, Zoe and Timmermann, A., eds. (2011) Architecture, Liturgy and Identity. Liber amicorum Paul Crossley. Studies in Gothic Art 1. Turnhout, Belgium: Brepols.
- Opacic, Zoe and Timmermann, A., Image, Memory and Devotion Liber Amicorum Paul Crossley: 2 (Studies in Gothic Art) (Turnhout: Brepols, 2011)

=== Selected articles ===
- “Sacred Mountaineering and the Imagery of Ascent from Catalonia to Provence, c. 1370 – c. 1520,” in 21: Inquiries into Art, History, and the Visual; Beiträge zur Kunstgeschichte und visuellen Kultur, 1 (2020), 11–62.
- “The Microarchitectural Stage-Management of Baptism from Lateran IV to the Counter-Reformation,” in The Journal of Ecclesiastical History, 71 (2020), 527–561.
- “Castles and Cathedrals of the Sea: Ships, Allegory and Technological Change in Pre-Reformation Northern Europe,” in Baltic Journal of Art History, 18 (2019), 7–74.
- “Of Trees and Shrines in Sixteenth-Century Transalpine Europe,” in Umĕní, 67 (2019), 150–167.
- “Die bewegliche Stadt: Jerusalem in der städtischen Imagination des Mittelalters,” in Faszination Stadt. Die Urbanisierung Europas im Mittelalter und das Magdeburger Recht, ed. Christina Link, exh. cat. (Magdeburg: Kulturhistorisches Museum, 2019), 169–182.
- “Fleeting Glimpses of Eschaton: Scalar Travels in Medieval Microarchitecture”, in Microarchitecture et figure du bâti: l'échelle à l'épreuve de la matière, ed. Clément Blanc, Jean-Marie Guillouët and Ambre Vilain (Paris: Picard: 2018), 57–66.

=== Encyclopedia entries ===
- "Microarchitecture", the Grove Dictionary of Medieval Art, edited by Colum Hourihane (Oxford: Oxford University Press, 2012)
- 20 entries including "Structuralism", "Art History and its Methods" and "New Art History" for The Oxford Companion to Western Art, ed. by Hugh Brigstocke (Oxford and New York: Oxford University Press, 2001); and Oxford Art Online.

== Photography ==
His photographs feature in The Authority of the Word: Reflecting on Image and Text in Northern Europe by Celeste Brusati.

== Awards ==
- 2019–2020 – Katherine Tsanoff Brown Annual Lecture at Rice University.
- 2013–2014 – University of Michigan, College of Literature, Sciences and the Arts: Michigan Humanities Award
- 2007–2008 – Warburg Institute, University of London: Kress Senior Fellowship (Residential).
- 2000–2001 – Getty Center, Los Angeles: Postdoctoral Fellowship (Nonresidential).
