= Edith Rickert =

American medievalist (1871–1938)

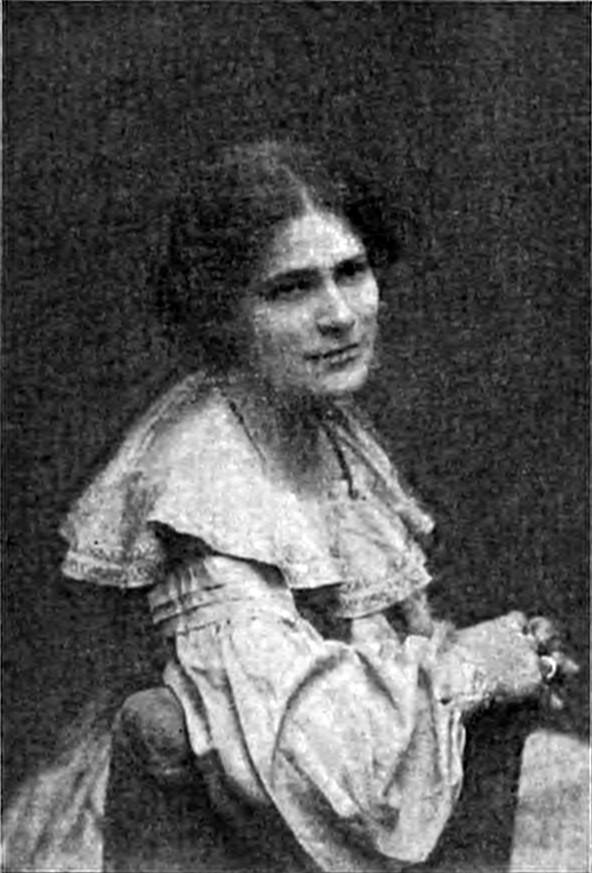
Edith Rickert

Edith Rickert (1871–1938) was a medieval scholar at the University of Chicago. Her work includes the Chaucer Life-Records and the eight-volume Text of the Canterbury Tales (1940).

== Life and career ==
Rickert was born in Dover, Ohio, to Francis E. Rickert, a pharmacist, and Caroline Josephine Newburgh. She was a member of Vassar College's class of 1891. Rickert's name and achievements are linked with those of John M. Manly (1865–1940). Close colleagues and collaborators for some 40 years at the University of Chicago, they worked jointly on the Chaucer Life-Records and the Text of the Canterbury Tales, which took sixteen years to complete, the first volume of which Rickert did not live to see published. Manly, president of the Modern Language Association of America (1920) and later of the Medieval Academy of America (1929–30), was posthumously recognized by being awarded such honors as the Haskins Medal for his work on the Chaucer manuscripts. Rickert, however, was eclipsed by Manly's shadow and is only now beginning to receive her the recognition she deserves.

From the information that is widely known about her, Rickert's literary work is organized into six categories: Books; Short Stories; Poems; Essays, Memoirs, and Reviews; Articles; and Translations and Works by Others. In her years traveling and studying Medieval literature in England, she constantly wrote and rewrote/made notes on these pieces. When she returned to the United States she worked as a writer in Boston for a few years, and moved to Washington D.C. to work as a cryptographer for the government during World War I. The details of this period in her life are fuzzy at first glance, but she did meet Manly at this position. From there they developed a close relationship and moved to the University of Chicago where they continued to work for over a decade on two main literary projects, as mentioned before. For years, Rickert's work as a cryptographer was ignored, and her work at the University of Chicago was only acknowledged because she worked with Manly. There are also many assumptions about her relationship with Manly, as they were both never married, and worked together in close proximity for a lengthy period of time.

Research on Rickert shows that she links military intelligence, modern textual analysis, and codebreaking, while managing to be a woman of elusive secrets. Rickert says in her book, “New Methods for the Study of Literature”, that she developed these methods from her years of experience in modernist literature, more specifically her role as a codebreaker for military intelligence. This links Rickert back to the American Black Chamber, where she was a founding member and leader of the MI-8 with Manly, prior to their years of work as Chaucer Scholars at the University of Chicago. In the Black Chamber, Yardley says that cryptographers have a certain way of thinking which makes them successful—these people were called cipher-brains. He said that amongst the thousands that worked for MI-8, there were only a dozen or so cipher-brains, including Manly and Rickert. They had a certain ability to develop and break code, pre-computer, which very few other individuals possessed at that time. Rickert took those skills of textual analysis into her career at the University of Chicago after MI-8, and that was how she was able to develop successful analyzation methods for her students. Rickert was mainly responsible for the arrest and prosecution of one of the most famous of the German spies of the first world war, Pablo Waberski, with her use of the Zimmerman cipher. The Black Chamber eventually morphed into the Central Intelligence Agency (CIA), and National Security Agency (NSA). Rickert then returned to the University of Chicago and used the tools she learned as a Cryptographer to analyze modernist literature, such as the works of Woolf, for the rest of her career until she died in 1938.

== Selected works ==
- (1902): Out of the Cypress Swamp [A novel.]. London: Methuen.
- (1904): The Reaper. [A novel.] New York: Grosset & Dunlap.
- (1906): Folly. New York: The Baker & Taylor Co.
- (1907): The Golden Hawk. New York: The Baker and Taylor Co.
- (1910): Ancient English Christmas Carols MCCCC-MDCC, Collected and Arranged By Edith Rickert With VIII Plates From Medieval Books of Hours. London: Chatto & Windus. 1910, 1914, 1915 (Duffield & Co., New York), 1925 (with Oxford Univ. Press), 1928 (with Cooper Square, New York), 1966 (Cooper Square), 2008 (Wildside Press, Rockville, MD.)
- (1923): The Bojabi Tree. New York: Doubleday, Page & Company
- (1929): The Greedy Goroo. New York: Doubleday, Doran & Company.
- (1940): Manly, John M. & Edith Rickert eds. The Text of the Canterbury Tales: studied on the basis of all known manuscripts; with the aid of Mabel Dean, Helen McIntosh and Others. With a chapter on illuminations by Margaret Rickert, 8 vols. Chicago: University of Chicago Press.
- 1948): Chaucer's World. Compiled by E. Rickert. Edited by Clair C. Olson and Martin M. Crow. Illustrations selected by Margaret Rickert. Oxford University Press: London; Columbia Univ. Press.

== Bibliography ==
- Kane, George (1984): "John M. Manly and Edith Rickert", in: Paul G. Ruggiers, ed. Editing Chaucer: The Great Tradition. Norman, Oklahoma: Pilgrim Books. Pp. 207–29.
- Ramsey, Roy Vance (1994): The Manly-Rickert Text of the Canterbury Tales. Lewiston, NY: Edwin Mellen Press.
- Scala, Elizabeth (Fall 2000): "Scandalous Assumptions: Edith Rickert and the Chicago Chaucer Project", in: Medieval Feminist Forum: 27–37.
- Scala, Elizabeth (2005): 'Miss Rickert of Vassar' and Edith Rickert at the University of Chicago (1871–1938)", in: Women Medievalists and the Academy, ed. Jane Chance. Madison, WI: University of Wisconsin Press, pp. 127–45.
- Tomasch, Sylvia (Fall 2004): "Editing as Palinode: The Invention of Love and the Text of the Canterbury Tales", in: Exemplaria 16:2, 457–76.
