= Paul Frankl =

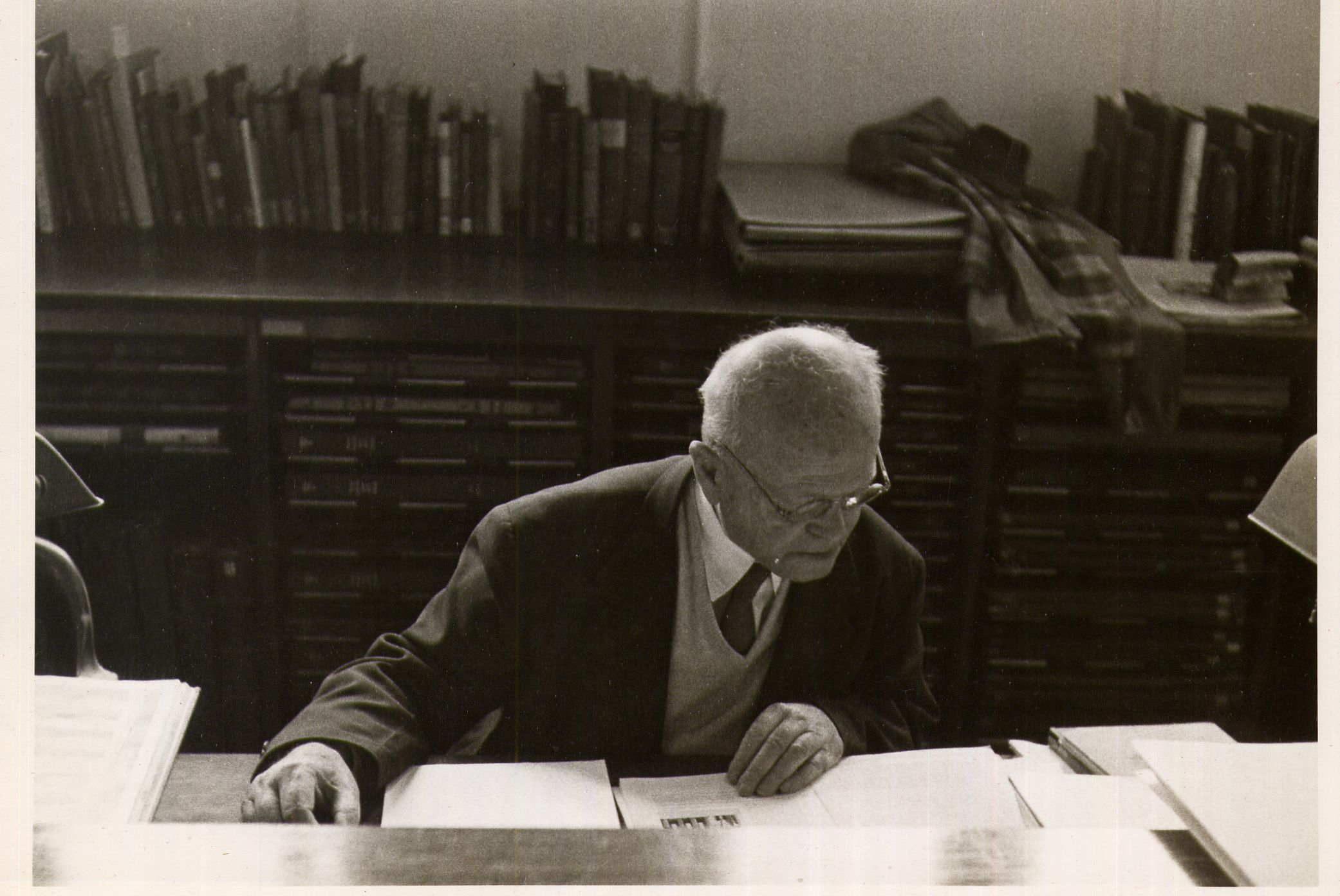
- Frankl at his desk in 1958
- Born: 22 April 1878; Prague, Bohemia, Austria-Hungary
- Died: 30 January 1962 (aged 83)

Academic background
- Education: LMU Munich

Academic work
- Discipline: Art history
- Institutions: Halle University; Princeton University
- Notable works: Das System der Kunstwissenschaft

Paul Frankl (22 April 1878 – 30 January 1962) was a German art historian. He is known for his writings on the history and principles of architecture, which he presented within a Gestalt-oriented framework.

== Early education and career ==
Paul Frankl was born in Prague into the rabbinic Spira-Frankl family. From 1888 to 1896, he attended a German gymnasium, after which he enrolled in the German Staats-Obergymnasium of Prague, graduating in 1896. He served for one year as Lieutenant in the Austrian military. In order to pursue a degree in higher education, he converted to Catholicism, a move that was not uncommon among non-Catholics during this era. He matriculated to the Technische Hochschule München and, later, the Technische Hochschule Berlin. He graduated with a degree in architecture in 1904.

While in Berlin, Frankl fostered social relationships with philosophers and artists including fellow Pragueian Max Wertheimer and Käthe Kollwitz. These artists and philosophers not only introduced Frankl to new systems of thinking, such as Gestalt psychology, but also to his future wife, the artist and musician, Elsa Herzberg, who shared a studio with Käthe Kollwitz. Frankl and Herzberg eventually had five children.

In 1908, Frankl left his work as an architect to study philosophy, history, and art history at the LMU Munich under Heinrich Wölfflin and Berthold Riehl, the founder of the Zentralinstitut für Kunstgeschichte. Riehl supervised Frankl's doctoral dissertation on fifteenth-century glass painting in southern Germany.

After the completion of his dissertation in 1910, Frankl worked as Wölfflin's assistant and wrote his Habilitationsschrift, which offered a systematic definition of the formal principles of architecture from the Renaissance onwards. Frankl was heavily influenced by Wölfflin's understanding of architectural development, but did not adhere to Wölfflin's views on formalism. From 1914 to 1920, Frankl held a position as privatdozent, which enabled him to teach at the LMU Munich while contributing to the Handbuch der Kunstwissenschaft (ed. Albert Brinckmann and Fritz Burger). In 1914, Frankl wrote his first theoretical work, Die Entwicklungsphasen der neueren Baukunst (1914). Die Entwicklungsphasen proposes four major categories of art history analysis – spatial composition, treatment of mass and surface, treatment of optical effects, and the relation of design to social function – that Frankl continued to draw upon in his later work.

Frankl held an assistant professorship at the LMU Munich from 1920 to 1921, after which he became full professor at the University of Halle. It was here that Frankl initiated his lifelong interest in medieval architecture. His study, Die frühmittelalterliche und romanische Baukunst (1926) shows his categorical distinctions between Romanesque and Gothic architecture – the former being "additive", "frontal", and "structural" while the latter is "partial", "diagonal", and "textural". In 1933, Frankl's enthusiasm for medieval architecture led him to join a group of medievalists at the 13th International Congress of the History of Art in Stockholm to view the only gothic church whose original wooden arch scaffolding was still extant.

The Nazis terminated Frankl's position at the University of Halle in 1934. Upon leaving the university, Frankl returned to the LMU Munich and wrote his treatise, Das System der Kunstwissenschaft (1938), which offered a comprehensive history of art grounded in phenomenology and morphology. Das System was issued in Czechoslovakia since Jewish authors were censored in Germany and Austria. During this time, Frankl also made a brief trip to Constantinople.

== Transitions to the United States, 1934–1947 ==
Frankl traveled to the United States in 1938, where he sought work and refuge from Nazi power. Although he was fluent in seven languages, English was not his strength. In spite of this, Frankl taught for a short time at a volunteer seminar that Julius S. Held organized. After six months, Frankl's visa expired and he became ill. In order to apply for US citizenship, he sailed to Cuba – to step on "foreign" soil – and reentered the United States as an immigrant. In 1939, with the assistance of Max Wertheimer, Paul Oskar Kristeller, and Erwin Panofsky, Frankl received a position as art historian at the Institute of Advanced Study at Princeton University. The Institute was under the direction of Frank Aydelotte at that time. In 1949, Frankl received a tenure appointment, which he held until his death.

Four days after Kristallnacht, Frankl's wife, Elsa, and daughter, Susanne, fled to Denmark from Munich. Elsa's son, Wolfgang, was in England at the time. Six months after entering Denmark, Elsa was allowed to enter England as well. Upon coming to England, she was interned as an "enemy alien" on the Isle of Man.

Wolfgang had left Germany in 1933 to live in Rome, but the increased Fascist threat prompted him to seek safety in England. When Wolfgang first came to England, he was interned as an "enemy alien". However, since Wolfgang was an architect, he was allowed to live in an apartment with the caveat that if he wandered more than 5 miles from the apartment, he had to inform the authorities. He helped to design buildings during the rebuilding of London after the Blitz.

Susanne escaped to Sweden with the Danish boat-saving rescue venture – Rescue of the Danish Jews – after the Nazis started their attempt at rounding up the Jews.

Another daughter, Johanna, survived the war in Berlin with protected status with her non-Jewish husband.

Frankl's youngest daughter, Regula, followed soon after Frankl to the US. Since she was still a minor, she was allowed to stay in the US without renewing her visa. She went to Radcliffe under a special program for German refugees.

As a personal response to the plight of the Jewish people and his family, Frankl joined a committee at Princeton that sought to hypothesize a world government system that would ensure that racial genocide could never happen again. Among the committee's members numbered Albert Einstein. During this period, Frankl wrote a book called Welt Regierung (1948), his own thoughts on a system of world government.

== Later life and career, 1947-1962 ==
Frankl returned to Europe in 1947 with the support of a Guggenheim Grant. For two years, Frankl studied European cathedrals and taught at European universities. After returning to the United States, he wrote The Gothic: Literary Sources and Interpretations through Eight Centuries (1960) and Gothic Architecture (1962), which he completed the day of his death. These works revealed Wölfflin's continued influence on Frankl, who applied his former advisor's ideas of architectural style while supplementing his study with an analysis of social function and religious significance.

== Legacy ==
Frankl's work on spatial analysis influenced many German architectural historians such as Siegfried Giedion and Nikolaus Pevsner. Frankl's pupil, Richard Krautheimer, may have been influenced by Frankl's writings on architectural function and significance. Frankl is responsible for creating the term "akyrism," which connotes the changing contexts and meanings of art.

Materials relating to Frankl's life and work are currently held at the Leo Baeck Institute in New York City, United States, and the Exilliteratur Archive in Frankfurt, Germany.

== Writings ==
- Die Glasmalerei des fünfzehnten Jahrhunderts in Bayern und Schwaben (Strasbourg, 1912)
- Die Entwicklungsphasen der neueren Baukunst (Leipzig and Berlin, 1914) (See English translation, The Principles of Architectural History: The Four Phases of Architectural Style, 1420–1900 (Cambridge, MA, and London, 1968, 1973)).
- Die frühmittelalterliche und romanische Baukunst (Potsdam, 1926)
- Das System der Kunstwissenschaft (Brno, 1938)
- Weltregierung (1948)
- Kistenfiger (1956)
- Theobald von Lixheim (1957 Zeit Schrift)
- The Gothic: Literary Sources and Interpretations through Eight Centuries (Princeton, 1960)
- Kunst Chronik (1961 Hemmel)
- "Boucher's Girl on the Couch" (1961)
- Encyclopædia Britannica article on Gothic Architecture (1962)
- "Roundel in Boston" (1962)
- Gothic Architecture, Pelican Hist. A. (Harmondsworth, 1962)
- Zu Fragen des Stils (Leipzig 1988)
