= Krautheim (disambiguation) =

Krautheim can refer to:

- Krautheim, a town in the Hohenlohe district in Baden-Württemberg
- Krautheim, Thuringia, a former municipality of Weimarer Land
- Krautheim (Volkach), district of Volkach, Bavaria
- Salm-Reifferscheid-Krautheim, a German statelet
