= Paul Crossley (art historian) =

British art historian (1945–2019)

Bernard Paul Crossley, FBA (19 July 1945 – 11 December 2019) was Professor of the History of Art at the Courtauld Institute of Art, University of London. He was elected a fellow of the British Academy in 2016. He was a specialist in the architecture of medieval Central Europe.

== Academic education ==
Crossley was educated at Downside School and Trinity College, Cambridge, where he was elected President of the Cambridge Union. He studied law between 1963 and 1965 before switching to History of Art, graduating in 1967.

== Career ==
Before joining the Courtauld Institute, he was Reader in the History of Art at the Manchester University from 1971 to 1990. He later served as Slade Professor of Fine Art at Cambridge between 2011 and 2012.

During his career, he was Vice President of the British Archaeological Association, Fellow of the Society of Antiquaries and Fellow of the Polish Academy of Arts and Sciences.

Photographs taken by Crossley are held in the Conway Library at the Courtauld Institute, and are currently being digitised.

== Scholarship ==
Matthew Reeve suggests that "from its beginning, Paul Crossley's scholarship offered a wholly catholic vision of late medieval art". Crossley's PhD thesis focused on the architectural patronage of King Casimir III the Great (1320–80), "research that, to a large extent, introduced the architecture of Poland to British scholarship".

Zoë Opačić and Achim Timmermann edited two Festschrifts in honour of Crossley: Architecture, Liturgy and Identity: Liber Amicorum Paul Crossley (Studies in Gothic Art 1), and Image, Memory and Devotion: Liber Amicorum Paul Crossley (Studies in Gothic Art 2).

== Personal life and death ==
He was married to Joany and had two children, Nick and Kate. Crossley died on 11 December 2019 at the age of 74.

== Bibliography ==
- Gothic Architecture in the Reign of Kasimir the Great: Church Architecture in Lesser Poland, 1320-1380, 1985, Kraków, Ministerstwo Kultury i Sztuki Zarza̜d Muzeów i Ochrony Zabytków
- Seventy-Fifth Anniversary of the Courtauld Institute of Art, 2008, Warburg Inst
- Medieval Architecture and Sculpture in the North West, 1978, Whitworth Art Gallery, University of Manchester
- The Man from Inner Space: architecture and meditation in the choir of St. Laurence in Nuremberg., 1988, University of Manchester Press
- Revised ed. of Paul Frankl's Gothic Architecture, 2000 Yale

== Festschrifts ==
- Image, Memory and Devotion: liber amicorum Paul Crossley, 2011, Brepols
- Architecture, Liturgy and Identity: liber amicorum Paul Crossley, 2011, Brepols
