= Germany and the Ottoman Railways: Art, Empire, and Infrastructure =

2017 book by Peter H. Christensen

- Author: Peter H. Christensen
- Language: English
- Subject: Ottoman Empire, railway construction, German Empire, architectural history, infrastructure
- Publisher: Yale University Press
- Publication date: 2017
- Pages: 204
- Awards: Alice Davis Hitchcock Award (2020)
- ISBN: 978-0-300-22564-8
- OCLC: 960058949

Germany and the Ottoman Railways: Art, Empire, and Infrastructure is a 2017 book by the American architectural historian Peter H. Christensen. The book presents a history of the railway network built across the Ottoman Empire between 1868 and 1919, largely by German firms and with German financing, going over the political, cultural, and material dimensions of the project through a wide range of visual and archival sources drawn from nine countries. Christensen treats the railway as a single, interconnected subject enveloping four subsections (the railways of European Turkey, the Anatolian Railways, the Baghdad Railway, and the Hejaz Railway) which had typically been studied separately. The core theme is the concept of "ambiguation," a term Christensen uses to characterize the German-Ottoman partnership as neither straightforwardly colonial nor fully reciprocal, but occupying a shifting gray zone in which sovereignty, expertise, and cultural production were continually negotiated. The book won the 2020 Alice Davis Hitchcock Award from the Society of Architectural Historians for the most distinguished work of scholarship in the history of architecture published by a North American scholar.

== Summary ==
Christensen studies the extensive railway network constructed across the Ottoman Empire between 1868 and 1919, predominantly by German firms, with German materials such as Krupp steel, and financed by German banks including Deutsche Bank. The book treats the railway not merely as a feat of engineering or a vehicle of geopolitics but as a cultural and artistic enterprise, analyzing the diverse array of objects it produced—train stations, maps, bridges, tunnels, monuments, paintings, photographs, archaeological artifacts, and urban landscapes—as primary sources that reveal the complexities of the German-Ottoman relationship. Christensen combines into a single study four railway subsections that have typically been treated separately owing to their different financing and ownership: the railways of European Turkey, the Anatolian Railways, the Baghdad Railway, and the Hejaz Railway with its Palestinian tributaries.

Christensen frames this relationship as fundamentally ambiguous, arguing that it does not fit neatly into conventional models of colonialism, imperialism, or technology transfer. The Ottoman Empire remained a sovereign state throughout, and the partnership yielded benefits and exerted pressures on both sides. He introduces the concept of "ambiguation" (the process by which conditions, roles, and objects are rendered ambiguous) as a unifying analytical framework, drawing on Simone de Beauvoir's existentialist treatment of ambiguity as a constitutive and potentially emancipatory condition rather than a mere dead end. He positions this framework against what he considers the limitations of two prevailing emphases in late Ottoman historiography: cosmopolitanism, which he suggests risks projecting an idealized past, and modernity, which he argues can obscure the contradictions and trauma inherent in modernization. Christensen describes the German-Ottoman relationship not as a "two-way street," the metaphor Zeynep Çelik has used for French-Ottoman encounters, but as a "coaxial thoroughfare"—an indivisible conduit with interests and information moving in both directions at all times.

The book is organized in two symmetrical parts of four chapters each. The first part traces how the railway generated various forms of knowledge, moving progressively downward in scale from the abstractions of geopolitics to the physical earth itself. The opening chapter, "Politics," provides a chronological overview of the diplomatic and financial maneuvering behind the railway, from early British-led ventures and the Tanzimat reforms through the reign of Sultan Abdülhamid II, Kaiser Wilhelm II's state visits, the Young Turk Revolution, the workers' strike of 1908, and the First World War. The chapter on "Geography" examines how the railway stimulated a body of geographic knowledge through travel literature, descriptive tracts, photographic albums such as the well-known Abdülhamid II albums, and the watercolor album by the German military artist Theodor Rocholl, commissioned by Deutsche Bank. Christensen situates this material within Friedrich Ratzel's concept of "anthropogeography" and the organic theory of the state, which envisioned borders as malleable membranes and allowed Germany to conceptualize its contiguous expansion southeastward through Austria-Hungary into Ottoman lands without recourse to the maritime colonialism practiced by Britain and France. "Topography" analyzes the cartographic representations that preceded and guided railway construction, centering on an innovative set of maps produced by the German engineer Wilhelm von Pressel in the 1870s for the Ottoman Ministry of the Interior. Christensen reads these maps as both practical instruments and aesthetic objects, noting how Pressel's proposed urban hierarchies for cities along the route were eventually amended by Ottoman administrators who brought different criteria of cultural and historical significance to bear. The chapter also discusses the topographic work of Gottlieb Schumacher in Palestine and the Stemrich Expedition's charting of the route from Konya to Baghdad. "Archaeology" traces the entanglement of railway construction and the excavation of antiquities, from the discovery of Gordium near a newly completed rail segment to the removal of the Mshatta palace façade for shipment to Berlin, examining how the Ottoman Antiquities Laws of 1869, 1884, and 1906 represented successive attempts to assert sovereignty over the empire's archaeological heritage against increasingly acquisitive foreign interests.

The second part reverses direction, building upward from the individual laborer to the scale of the city, and examines how knowledge was translated into physical form. "Construction" details the multiethnic labor forces that built the railways, cataloging the dozens of national and ethnic designations found in employment records and exploring the hierarchies of pay, skill, and ethnicity that structured the work sites. Christensen notes that while the diversity of the workforce might suggest cosmopolitanism, relations were marked by significant power imbalances, intercultural strife, and, during the war, the use of prisoners of war as forced labor. "Hochbau," a German term encompassing all construction above ground level, analyzes the built environment of the railway (its bridges, tunnels, and stations) as products of a unified administrative system that nevertheless yielded significant local variation. The chapter traces how the serial prototype of the Heimatstil station, rooted in German vernacular building traditions, was adapted across vastly different environments and labor conditions, producing mutations that reflected the contributions of local masons and craftsmen whose work often exceeded the detail provided in the original blueprints. It examines major structures including the Orientalist Sirkeci terminus in Istanbul, the Neo-Renaissance Haydarpaşa station on the Bosphorus, the Islamicizing Cilician stations designed by the architect Hellmuth Cuno after the Young Turk Revolution, and the Medina terminus of the Hejaz Railway. "Monuments" surveys commemorative structures ranging from the elaborate German Fountain given by Kaiser Wilhelm II to Sultan Abdülhamid II (whose iterative design process Christensen reconstructs through five surviving drawings) to humble memorials erected by workers in the Taurus Mountains and a locomotive converted into a moving mosque for the Hejaz Railway. The final chapter, "Urbanism," considers the railway's effects on the cities and towns it traversed, arguing that a distinctive "Ottoman railway urbanism" emerged from the consistent practice of siting stations outside existing city centers and connecting them by wide boulevards, a pattern that differed from the European norm of integrating railways into urban cores.

In the conclusion, Christensen returns to the concept of ambiguation. He situates it in relation to a pamphlet issued by the archaeologist Theodor Wiegand instructing the engineers of the Baghdad Railway on how to collect geographic, topographic, and archaeological data in the course of their construction work.

== Critical reception ==
British architectural historian G. A. Bremner described the book as "one of the most sophisticated, in-depth accounts" of the relationship between architecture and infrastructure to date. He praised its methodological contribution in forcing consideration of factors usually ignored in conventional architectural history. Bremner found the study "convincing" and "a refreshing departure" from more problematic interpretations of Ottoman modernization as willing assimilation of Western expertise, though he noted that the analytical theme of ambiguity occasionally became strained, "leading to a degree of ambiguity in its own right."

Emily Neumeier observed that Christensen made the popular subject of the Ottoman railroad his own by bringing the railway itself and its people to the center of the narrative, hence offering "an ambitious spatial, material, and cultural history of the eastern Mediterranean."

Zeynep Kezer found that the book introduced a valuable international geopolitical dimension to the growing literature on infrastructure in architectural and urban history.

For Mehmet Yerçil, the work is "worthy of suggestion to historians of the Kaiserreich, Ottoman Empire and German-Turkish relations." At the same time, he argued that the unifying concept of ambiguity was overstretched to explain nearly everything. Nonetheless, Yerçil welcomed the creative approach, ambitious scope, and genuine intellectual effort to introduce an incisive terminology to imperial and colonial historiography.

Sam Grinsell suggested that while the conceptual argument about ambiguation was provocative and deserving of serious consideration from colonial and postcolonial historians, it was not always as thoroughly woven into the empirical sections as it might have been. Nevertheless, he thought that the book's rich archival base spanning nine countries and its generous high-quality illustrations would make it valuable for teaching as well as research. Grinsell called the book "both a beautiful object and a significant scholarly achievement."

Benjamin Biebl praised the novel perspective as an art historian's study of the Ottoman railway network and found the insights into German and Ottoman ideas and strategies valuable. He cautioned, however, that the central application of the ambiguity concept was "in some parts overstretched and distracts from the actual study," and that themes such as partial resistance to the railways and the asymmetric interests of multiethnic entities within the Ottoman Empire might usefully have been given fuller treatment.

To İrfan Kokdaş, one of the book's most important contributions is its in-depth analysis of the ambiguous relationship between archaeology and the imperial railway system. He showed how German personnel engaged in laying track turned into "dual engineer-archaeologists."

Ashley Dimmig found the concept of ambiguation "provocative and effective" and transferable to other studies investigating transregional or intercultural relationships. She thought that there remained room to further develop and nuance the different modes through which ambiguation occurred.

== Awards ==
- The 2020 Alice Davis Hitchcock Award from the Society of Architectural Historians for the most distinguished work of scholarship in the history of architecture published by a North American scholar
