= Peter H. Christensen =

American art historian

- Christensen in April 2025
- Born: August 20, 1981 (age 45); New York City, U.S.
- Education: Grace Church School (1996); Ethical Culture Fieldston School (2000); Cornell University (BArch, 2004); Harvard University (AM 2011, PhD 2014)
- Awards: Berlin Prize (2024); Guggenheim Fellowship (2021); Alice Davis Hitchcock Award (2020); National Endowment for the Humanities fellowship (2019); Fulbright Program fellowship (2011)
- Scientific career
- Fields: Humanities; History of architecture; Environmental history
- Workplaces: University of Rochester; Technical University of Munich; Museum of Modern Art

Peter H. Christensen is the Arthur Satz Professor of the Humanities at and Senior Associate Dean of the University of Rochester College of Arts Sciences and Engineering. He has held a Guggenheim Fellowship, the Berlin Prize and is a former member of the Institute for Advanced Study. He is the Ani and Mark Gabrellian Director of the Humanities Center at the University of Rochester. He has been visiting faculty at Cornell University and serves on the board of the Society of Architectural Historians. He is the editor for the "Humanities in the World" series at the University of Rochester Press.

== Education ==
Christensen graduated with a professional degree in architecture from Cornell University in 2005 and studied at Harvard University and Humboldt University of Berlin on a Fulbright Program fellowship before completing his Ph.D. at Harvard in 2014. His doctoral advisors were Eve Blau, Gülru Necipoğlu, and Antoine Picon.

== Curatorial and academic career ==
From 2005 to 2008 Christensen served as Curatorial Assistant in the Department of Architecture and Design at the Museum of Modern Art where he co-curated the 2008 exhibition "Home Delivery: Fabricating the Modern Dwelling" with Barry Bergdoll which included the construction of five full-scale houses in midtown Manhattan, including works by Larry Sass, KieranTimberlake, and Richard Horden. The catalogue for this exhibition won the 2010 Philip Johnson Exhibition Catalogue Award from the Society of Architectural Historians.

Christensen's academic research focuses on the intersection of architectural history, environmental history, and infrastructure studies, with a focus on 19th and 20th century international architectural history, particularly of Central and Southeastern Europe and Ottoman and post-Ottoman lands. His book, Germany and the Ottoman Railways: Art, Empire, and Infrastructure (Yale University Press, 2017) was awarded the 2020 Alice Davis Hitchcock Award from the Society of Architectural Historians for "the most distinguished work of scholarship in the history of architecture published by a North American scholar."

Christensen uses computational techniques to analyze imperceptible differences in serially produced objects including buildings, chairs, and the projectile point, a digital humanities project called "Architectural Biometrics."

In 2022, Christensen, noted as "an internationally recognized scholar of architectural history and design," was named the Ani and Mark Gabrellian Director of the Humanities Center at the University of Rochester.

== Selected works ==
- Prior Art: Patents and The Nature of Invention in Architecture, MIT Press (2024)
- Precious Metal: German Steel, Modernity, and Ecology, Penn State University Press (2022)
- (as editor) Buffalo at the Crossroads: The Past, Present, and Future of American Urbanism (2020)
- (as editor) Expertise and Architecture in the Modern Islamic World: A Critical Anthology (2018)
- Germany and the Ottoman Railway Network: Art, Empire and Infrastructure (2017)
- (as editor) Architecturalized Asia: Mapping a Continent Through History (2014)
- (with Mohsen Mostafavi) Instigations: Engaging Architecture, Landscape and the City (2012)
- (with Barry Bergdoll) Home Delivery: Fabricating the Modern Dwelling (2008)
