= Dell Upton =

American architectural historian

- Education: Colgate University; Brown University
- Occupation: Architect

Signature
- Architectural History; Urban History; Art History

Dell Thayer Upton (born Fort Monmouth, New Jersey, 1949) is an architectural historian. He is emeritus professor at the department of art history at University of California, Los Angeles, and Professor Emeritus of Architecture at the University of California, Berkeley. He had taught previously at the University of Virginia.

Upton studied history and English as a Phi Beta Kappa undergraduate at Colgate University from 1965 to 1970. He earned an M.A. (1975) and Ph.D. (1980) in American Civilization at Brown University. His dissertation concerned seventeenth- and eighteenth-century domestic architecture in Tidewater Virginia, written under the supervision of James Deetz.

He taught for many years at UC Berkeley, before moving in 2002 to the University of Virginia, where he was David A. Harrison Professor of Anthropology and Architecture, with appointments in the School of Architecture and the department of anthropology. He resumed teaching at the University of California, Los Angeles as Professor of Architectural History and chair of the Department of Art History.

Upton authored the 1998 textbook Architecture in the United States for the Oxford University Press' Oxford Art History series and American Architecture, A Thematic History with Oxford in 2019. Upton has written extensively on vernacular landscapes of the American built environment. His work on Colonial and Antebellum America include Another City: Urban Life and Urban Spaces in the New American Republic (Yale University Press, 2008), Holy Things and Profane: Anglican Parish Churches in Colonial Virginia (MIT Press, 1986), Madaline: Love and Survival in Antebellum New Orleans (University of Georgia Press, 1996), and America’s Architectural Roots: Ethnic Groups That Built America (Preservation Press, 1986). As a founding member of the Vernacular Architecture Forum, Upton has published on materialist history and theory as separate from canonical architectural histories in works such as Common Places: Readings in American Vernacular Architecture, with John Michael Vlach (University of Georgia Press, 1986) and "Architecture History or Landscape History?" in the Journal of the Society of Architectural Historians (August 1991). He wrote the chief essay for the Metropolitan Museum of Art's exhibition "Art and the Empire City: New York 1825–1861 in 2000. He examined histories of civic memorials in What Can and Can't Be Said: Race, Uplift, and Monument Building in the Contemporary South (Yale University Press, 2015).

== Honors and awards ==
- National Endowment of the Humanities Research fellow, 1981–1982
- Vernacular Architecture Forum Abbott Lowell Cummings Award (1986 and 2008)
- American Studies Association John Hope Franklin Prize, 1987
- Society of Architectural Historians Alice Davis Hitchcock Award, 1987
- Getty Senior Research grantee in art history, 1990.
- Guggenheim Fellow, 1990.
- Society of Architectural Historians Spiro Kostof Book Award, 2011
- Fellow, Society of Architectural Historians, 2014
- American Academy in Rome James Marston Fitch Resident in Historic Preservation, 2019
- Kress-Beineke Professor, Center for Advanced Study in the Visual Arts, 2020–2021
