= Eve Blau =

American historian

- Occupations: Historian, educatior
- Spouse: Peter Rose

Academic background
- Education: University of York; Yale University
- Thesis: The Architecture of Deane and Woodward, 1845-1861 (1978)
- Doctoral advisor: George L. Hersey
- Other advisor: Vincent Scully

Eve Blau is a historian and scholar who teaches at the Graduate School of Design at Harvard University as a professor of the History and Theory of Urban Form and Design, as well as Director of Research. Blau has contributed to scholarship on the history of architecture and urban design. In 2015 she received the Victor Adler State Prize (Victor Adler-Staatspreis für Gesichte sozialer Bewegungen 2015) from the Austrian Ministry of Science, Research, and Economy for her work on Red Vienna and her book The Architecture of Red Vienna: 1919-1934. The Victor Adler State Prize is given for scholarship that is distinguished by its interdisciplinary breadth, use of innovative methods, contemporary historical questions, and that is widely published. In 2018, she was named Fellow of the Society of Architectural Historians and in 2022, she was inducted into the American Academy of Arts & Sciences.

== Early life and education ==
Blau's parents were Austrian, and she grew up between Europe and the US.

Blau attended the Ecole d'Humanité in Switzerland and the Internationale Sommerakademie für Bildende Kunst in Salzburg before going on to graduate from the University of York with a Bachelor of Arts degree in English and Sociology. Her postgraduate studies in the History of Architecture took her to Yale University, where she was awarded a Master of Arts in 1974 and a Doctor of Philosophy in 1978.

== Career ==
Blau began her teaching career in the Art and Art History Department at Wesleyan University. She was the Head of the Department of Exhibitions and Publications (1984–1991) then Curator of Exhibitions and Publications (1991–2001) at the Canadian Centre for Architecture.

She was a Professor of the History of Architecture (2004–2011) in the Department of Architecture at the Harvard University Graduate School of Design, while Toshiko Mori was chair. Blau served as Director of the Master in Architecture Degree Programs (2008–2011). She has been part of the school's Department of Urban Planning and Design as Professor of the History and Theory of Urban Form and Design. In 2019, Blau was appointed as Director of Research by Mohsen Mostafavi.

Blau has held visiting professorships at McGill University (1983), Williams College (1995), and the University at Buffalo (2016).

From 1997 to 2000, Blau served as the Editor of the Journal of the Society of Architectural Historians.

Blau's research has focused extensively on a range of issues in architectural history and theory, specifically in Europe and Eurasia, as well as the intersection of urban spatial form and media. Her publications have covered topics such as Red Vienna in Austria and the petroleum industry in Azerbaijan.

== Photography ==
Photographs attributed to Blau appear in the collection of the Conway Library at the Courtauld Institute of Art. Images captured includes religious and secular buildings, sculptures, and various communities. A linked exhibition of her work ran there from October 2017 to March 2018, which highlighted the architectural importance of the Greystone buildings in Montreal.

== Works ==
- The Architecture of Red Vienna, 1999, ISBN 978-0262535687
- Project Zagreb: Transition as Condition, Strategy, Practice, with Ivan Rupnik, 2007, ISBN 978-8496540576
- Architecture and Cubism, with Nancy Troy, 2012, ISBN 978-0262523288
- Baku: Oil and Urbanism, 2018, ISBN 978-3038600763

== Awards ==
- 2000 Society of Architectural Historians Spiro Kostof Book Award for The Architecture of Red Vienna (1999)
- 2001 Society of Architectural Historians Alice Davis Hitchcock Award for The Architecture of Red Vienna (1999)
- 2015 Victor Adler State Prize of the Republic of Austria for the German translation of The Architecture of Red Vienna (2014)
- 2018 Fellow of the Society of Architectural Historians
- 2019 DAM Architectural Book Award for Baku: Oil and Urbanism (2018)
- 2022 Elected Member of American Academy of Arts & Sciences
