= Keith N. Morgan =

Keith N. Morgan is an architectural historian and professor emeritus of American and European architecture at Boston University.

Morgan earned his B.A. at the College of Wooster in 1971, his M.A. at the University of Delaware in 1973, and his Ph.D. at Brown University in 1978.

Morgan taught at Boston University from 1980 to 2016. He was director of the Boston University Graduate Studies program in the History of Art and Architecture Department (1987–89, 1996–97, 2005-8) and Director of Architectural Studies in the History of Art & Architecture Department (2009–2016). He previously also served as director of the Preservation Studies Program and of the American and New England Studies Program. He served as the chairman of the History of Art and Architecture Department (1989–94, 1997–99).

Morgan's books include Boston Architecture, 1975-1990 (co-authored with Naomi Miller), Charles A. Platt: The Artist as Architect, and Shaping a New American Landscape: The Art and Architecture of Charles A. Platt.

Morgan is the editor and one of the principal authors for Buildings of Massachusetts: Metropolitan Boston (a volume in the Buildings of the United States series sponsored by the Society of Architectural Historians). Morgan was the architecture editor for The Encyclopedia of New England.

Morgan was president of the Society of Architectural Historians from 1994 to 1996.

== Books ==
- Morgan, Keith N. and Miller, Naomi, Boston Architecture, 1975-1990, Munich: Prestel-Verlag, 1990, ISBN 3-7913-1097-6
- Morgan, Keith N., Charles A. Platt: The Artist as Architect, New York: Architectural History Foundation; Cambridge, Mass.: MIT Press, 1985, ISBN 0-262-13188-9
- Morgan, Keith N., Shaping an American Landscape: The Art and Architecture of Charles A. Platt, Hanover, N.H.: Hood Museum of Art and University Press of New England, 1995, ISBN 0-87451-704-4, ISBN 0-87451-705-2
