= Keith Morgan =

Keith Morgan may refer to:

- Keith Morgan (judoka) (born 1973), Canadian Olympic judoka
- Keith N. Morgan, American architectural historian
- Junior Kelly (Keith Morgan, born 1969), Jamaican reggae artist
- Keith Morgan (footballer) (born 1940), footballer with Swindon Town
