= Franklin Toker =

American historian (1944–2021)

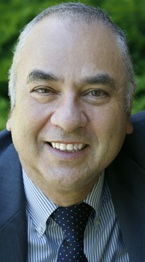
- Toker in 2010
- Born: April 29, 1944; Montreal, Quebec, Canada
- Died: April 19, 2021 (aged 76); Pittsburgh, Pennsylvania, U.S.

Franklin K. Toker (29 April 1944 – 19 April 2021) was a Canadian-American professor of the history of art and architecture at the University of Pittsburgh and the author of nine books on the history of art and architecture, ranging from the excavations he conducted under the famed Cathedral of Saint Maria del Fiore, Florence to 21st century American urbanism. A past president of the Society of Architectural Historians, in 1979 Toker was the winner of a Guggenheim Fellowship in Architecture, Planning, & Design.

Born in Montreal in 1944, Toker obtained degrees in fine arts from McGill University, Oberlin College, and a PhD from Harvard University before obtaining a faculty position at the University of Pittsburgh, retiring in 2018. Toker died on April 19, 2021, in his home in Squirrel Hill, City of Pittsburgh.

Toker's The Church of Notre-Dame in Montréal won the Alice Davis Hitchcock Award of the Society of Architectural Historians. He was awarded the Porter Prize of the College Art Association for his article in The Art Bulletin. He was known for his book, Fallingwater Rising: Frank Lloyd Wright, E. J. Kaufmann, and America's Most Extraordinary House, about the creation of Frank Lloyd Wright's masterpiece Fallingwater, which was named a New York Times notable book of 2003. He was also noted for his works on the architecture of Pittsburgh, but his international reputation rested on his "Florence Duomo Project", (Brepols Publishing), of which two volumes were published. CAA Reviews for February 6, 2014, called the work in Florence, "one of the major archaeological campaigns of this generation," and said of The Florence Duomo Project: "Stepping back to digest this material, as Toker has been able to do with such rigor, candor, insight, and sensitivity, we witness the way in which successful collaboration can produce spectacular results—results that together can, quite literally, alter the face of history."

== Selected publications ==
Aside from numerous articles, Toker wrote

- The Church of Notre Dame in Montreal: An Architectural History (Montreal, McGill-Queen's University Press, 1970 and second, paperback edition 1991) winner of the Hitchcock Award of the Society of Architectural Historians as most distinguished new book in architectural history for 1970. The book studied not just a new architectural style coming into Canada, but how a French-speaking and Catholic constituency used this new style to advance their political agenda. Published in French as L'église Notre-Dame de Montréal: son architecture, son passé (Montreal, Hurtubise-HMH 1992).
- Santa Reparata : l'antica cattedrale fiorentina, i risultati dello scavo condotto dal 1965 al 1974 (With Guido Morozzi and John Herrmann; Florence: Bonechi, 1974). This book, a triumph of Italian color printing for a popular audience, laid out the essentials of the excavations under the Cathedral of Florence from 1965 through 1974, of which Toker directed the second half.
- Pittsburgh: An Urban Portrait (Pennsylvania State University Press, 1986; winner, Award of Merit, Pittsburgh History & Landmarks Foundation; second, paperback edition University of Pittsburgh Press, 1991). This was a pioneer attempt to understand a city through a synthesis of architectural and urban history. The journal Pennsylvania History wrote of it that "perhaps we historians ought to pass a regulation that henceforth none among us. . .is allowed into the city without having read Toker's portrait."
- Fallingwater Rising: Frank Lloyd Wright, E. J. Kaufmann, and America's Most Extraordinary House (New York: Knopf/Random House, 2003; five hardcover and two paperback printings). A New York Times notable book for 2003. The first and most authoritative book on Wright’s masterpiece: the context within his career, the ecology of the site; the patron and his aspirations; the architectural design and its many recollections of American history; the hype that put it on a world stage; its meaning within American culture of the 1930s and today. Chinese edition as Liu shui bie shu zhuan (Beijing: Quin-hua University Press, 2009). Japanese edition pending.
- Buildings of Pittsburgh (University of Virginia Press, 2007). An encyclopedia of Pittsburgh’s notable buildings.
- Buildings of Pennsylvania: Pittsburgh and Western Pennsylvania (With Lu Donnelley, David Brumble; University of Virginia Press, 2009).
- Pittsburgh: A New Portrait Pittsburgh: University of Pittsburgh Press, 2009 . This full-color revision and reorganization of an earlier text presents Pittsburgh as an ongoing expansion from its 18th-century core, and goes far to explaining the revitalization that distinguishes Pittsburgh from all industrial cities, not just in America but worldwide.
- On Holy Ground: Liturgy, Architecture and Urbanism in the Cathedral and the Streets of Medieval Florence (The Florence Duomo Project, 1) London and Turnhout: Harvey Miller/Brepols, 2009). An assembly of medieval textual sources on the early cathedral of Florence, destroyed by 1375. A pioneer study of liturgical texts (including 122 pages of transcriptions) and how they shaped not only the architecture but the urbanism of medieval Florence.
- Archaeological Campaigns Below the Florence Duomo and Baptistery, 1895-1980 (The Florence Duomo Project, 2; London and Turnhout: Harvey Miller/Brepols, 2012). With 54 color and 541 b/w illustrations, this volume treats not only the six chronological levels excavated below S. Maria del Fiore, but also the 17,000 excavated artifacts through both formal and scientific analysis. A masterpiece of collaborative scholarship and user-friendly text on a crucial site, by the director of the main portion of the archaeological excavations.
- Reconstructing the Cathedral and Baptistery of Florence in Late Antiquity and the Middle Ages (The Florence Duomo Project, 3; unpublished)
- When Stones Speak: The Florence Duomo Excavations in the Light of History (The Florence Duomo Project, 4; unpublished)
