= George L. Hersey =

American art historian

- Born: George Leonard Hersey; August 30, 1927; Cambridge, Massachusetts, United States of America
- Died: October 23, 2007 (aged 80); New Haven, Connecticut, United States of America
- Occupations: Art historian Educator
- Spouse: Jane Maddox Lancefield (m. 1953–2007)
- Children: 2
- Relatives: Rebecca Lancefield (mother-in-law)

Academic background
- Education: Harvard University; Yale University

Academic work
- Doctoral students: Eve Blau; Susan Casteras

George Leonard Hersey (August 30, 1927 – October 23, 2007) was an American art historian. Hersey was an expert on Italian Renaissance art and architecture, as well as 19th century American art and architecture. His work discussed the relationship between biology and sexuality to art and architecture.

== Career ==
Born to Katharine Page (1896–1991) and Milton Leonard Hersey (1899–1983), who was an economist, Hersey served as a merchant marine after completing high school in 1945, and also later joined the United States Army from 1946 to 1947. He received his Bachelor of Arts from Harvard University in 1951. Hersey then earned three degrees from Yale University: a Master of Fine Arts in Drama (1954); a Master of Arts in Art History (1960); and a Doctor of Philosophy in Art History (1964). In 1962, he was named as a scholar of the Fulbright Program to study art in Italy.

Hersey began his academic career at Bucknell University (1954–1959), where he taught drama. He returned to Yale to teach set design in the Drama School, while also pursuing an Art History degree. Following his Ph.D. he began to teach architectural history at Yale. There, he moved through the ranks from assistant professor of art history to associate professor to full professor. In 1992, Hersey was named professor emeritus. He was a popular, though eccentric, professor who ranged widely in scholarly interests—after writing about architecture in Naples he published a book on Victorian architecture in America, then turned to studying anthropomorphism in art. He was a true polymath who played the French horn, worked as a set designer, and had a command of all the major European languages, including Ancient Greek and Latin.

Hersey also served as Director of Restoration Research at the Lockwood–Mathews Mansion in Norwalk, member of the Society of Architectural Historians, and member of The Victorian Society.

== Personal life ==
Hersey died in 2007 in his home in New Haven.

== Works ==
- Pythagorean Palaces: Architecture and Magic in the Italian Renaissance (1976)
- The Lost Meaning of Classical Architecture: Speculations on Ornament from Vitruvius to Venturi (1988)
- High Renaissance Art in St. Peters and the Vatican (1993)
- The Evolution of Allure: Sexual Selection from the Medici Venus to the Incredible Hulk (1996)
- The Monumental Impulse: Architecture's Biological Roots (1999)
- Architecture and Geometry in the Age of the Baroque (2002)
- Falling in Love with Statues: Artificial Humans from Pygmalion to the Present (2009)
