= Penelope Davies =

Roman archaeologist and art historian

- Known for: Roman architecture

Academic background
- Education: University of Cambridge

Academic work
- Institutions: University of Texas at Austin

Penelope Jane Ellis Davies is a Roman archaeologist and art historian. She specialises in the architectural history of ancient Rome. She is a Professor of Art History, Roman Art and Architecture at the University of Texas at Austin.

== Education ==
Davies was educated at the University of Cambridge and Yale University. Her thesis was titled 'Politics and Design: The Funerary Monuments of the Roman Emperors from Augustus to Marcus Aurelius (28 B.C.-A.D. 193)'.

== Career ==
Davies is Professor of Art History, Roman Art and Architecture at the University of Texas. Her 2017 monograph, Architecture and Politics in Republican Rome, is described as "an authoritative account of the inextricable relationship between Roman art and architecture and Roman history". Davies has collaborated on recent editions of Janson's History of Art and Janson's A Basic History of Art. In 2008, Davies was the Hugh Last Fellow at the British School at Rome in 2008. Davies was the winner of the Dallas Museum of Arts’ Vasari Award and in 2016 she received the College of Fine Arts Teaching Award.

== Selected publications ==
- 1997. The Politics of Perpetuation: Trajan's Column and the Art of Commemoration. American Journal of Archaeology 101 (1): 47–48. DOI:10.2307/506249
- 2000. Death and the Emperor (Cambridge University Press)
- 2017. Architecture and Politics in Republican Rome (Cambridge University Press)
- 2017. A Republican Dilemma: City or State? Or, The Concrete Revolution Revisited. Papers of the British School at Rome 85: 71–107.
- 2019. Vandalism and Resistance in Republican Rome. Journal of the Society of Architectural Historians 78(1): 6-24. DOI: 10.1525/jsah.2019.78.1.6
