= Shigehisa =

- Gender: Male

Origin
- Origin: Japanese
- Meaning: Different meanings depending on the kanji used

Shigehisa (written: 繁久 or 茂久) is a masculine Japanese given name. Notable people with the name include:

- Shigehisa Fujikawa (藤川 繁久), Japanese astronomer
- Shigehisa Kuriyama (栗山 茂久), American historian

== See also ==
- 8736 Shigehisa, main-belt asteroid
