= Robert Grant Irving =

Robert Grant Irving is an author and lecturer specializing in the history of art and architecture of Britain and the British Empire. His book Indian Summer: Lutyens, Baker, and Imperial Delhi (Yale University Press, 1981 and Oxford University Press, 1982) is the story of the creation of New Delhi from 1911 to 1931, the grandest architectural undertaking in the history of the British Empire. The principal architects were the two leading practitioners of the day, Sir Edwin Lutyens and Sir Herbert Baker. Irving's book won the British Council Prize in the Humanities as well as the highest honor of the Society of Architectural Historians, the Alice Davis Hitchcock Book Award.

Irving was born in Hartford, Connecticut of Scottish-Canadian parents and was educated at Balliol College, Oxford; King's College, Cambridge; and Yale University. He holds degrees in history and the history of art and architecture. A Fellow of Berkeley College at Yale, he has taught at Yale, Wesleyan, Trinity College in Hartford, and the University of Virginia. Irving has lectured at universities and museums on six continents. He has held research grants in India, Africa, Britain, and the United States, including a Fulbright Scholarship and Fellowships from the Woodrow Wilson National Fellowship Foundation, American Institute of Indian Studies, American Council of Learned Societies, Ernest Oppenheimer Memorial Trust, National Endowment for the Humanities, and the John Simon Guggenheim Memorial Foundation.

Irving has been a lifetime advocate and activist for historic preservation.

During his studies at Yale in preparation for his dissertation, Irving had been conducting research in India in 1968–69. Irving had placed all his research material in two trunks that were shipped from New Delhi to Hartford. Upon his return to Yale in 1969, he discovered that Pan American World Airways had lost his research. The airline permitted Irving to visit John F. Kennedy Airport to search through 16 acres (not 60, as stated in a news article) of unclaimed luggage. He was able to locate one trunk, but the contents had become damaged and useless because of exposure to the weather. Irving filed a successful $15,000 (not $35,000, as stated in a press article) lawsuit to recoup expenses accrued on his return to India to redo his entire research and photography. Discovered too late to be of use, the second trunk surfaced at a Boston airport warehouse after more than four years.

The completed dissertation became the basis for the award-winning book Indian Summer.

== Selected works ==
- Articles and reviews for Architecture (American Institute of Architects), Perspecta (Yale School of Architecture), Progressive Architecture, and House and Garden.
- Indian Summer: Lutyens, Baker, and Imperial Delhi, published by Yale University Press (London) in November 1981, Yale University Press (New Haven) in April 1982, and Oxford University Press (New Delhi) in May 1982. Second printing, May 1982. Paperbound edition, August 1983. Third printing, December 1983.
- "Bombay and Imperial Delhi: Cities as Symbols." In Lutyens Abroad: The Work of Sir Edwin Lutyens outside the British Isles, edited by Andrew Hopkins and Gavin Stamp, pp. 169–180. London: The British School at Rome, 2002.
- "Art for Empire's Sake: Architecture and Symbolism in British India." In Architectural Culture circa 1900, edited by Claudia Shmidt and Fabio Grimentieri. Buenos Aires: Torcuato Di Tella University and UNESCO, 2003.
