= Roulhac Toledano =

American historian (born 1938)

- Born: Roulhac Bunkley Toledano; December 16, 1936 (age 89); New Orleans, Louisiana, U.S.
- Occupations: Author, historian, preservationist

Roulhac Bunkley Toledano (born December 16, 1938) is an American writer, historian and preservationist. She has written and contributed to several publications, including volume five of the New Orleans Architecture series, titled The Esplanade Ridge (1977) and The National Trust Guide to Savannah (1997).

== Early life ==
Toledano was born in New Orleans, Louisiana, in 1939, to Dr. Thomas Allen Bunkley and Phylis Gewin, the first of their two children. A brother, Thomas Allen Bunkley Jr., was born in 1941. She grew up in the Comanche country of West Texas. Her father studied at Tulane University medical school, living in Richardson Memorial Hall. While growing up, on nearby Broadway, she was looked after by a nanny from Alabama. She recalls admiring the architecture of the campus.

== Career ==
After obtaining an undergraduate degree at H. Sophie Newcomb Memorial College in 1960, for which she had been studying art history in Spain, she spent her junior year at the Complutense University of Madrid.

Toledano worked as a member of staff in the Tulane University Foreign Language Department. In 1978, she was on the advisory committee, southwest region, of the National Park Service.

Also in 1978, she was awarded the Society of Architectural Historians' Alice Davis Hitchcock Book Award for New Orleans Architecture: The Esplanade Ridge, volume V, which she co-authored with Mary Louise Christovich, Sally Kittredge Evans and Betsy Swanson.

Toledano's 1997 publication, The National Trust Guide to Savannah, includes a foreword by John Berendt, author of Midnight in the Garden of Good and Evil.

== Personal life ==
In 1959, Toledano married Benjamin "Chad" Toledano (1932–2021), of Andalusian origin, with whom she had four children before divorcing. They lived on Chestnut Street in New Orleans.

In 1986, a 19-year-old Dave Matthews began using Toledano's warehouse in Charlottesville, Virginia, as a rehearsal space.

== Selected publications ==
- New Orleans Architecture: The Esplanade Ridge (1977)
- The National Trust Guide to Savannah (1997)
