= Antoinette Downing =

American historian (1904–2001)

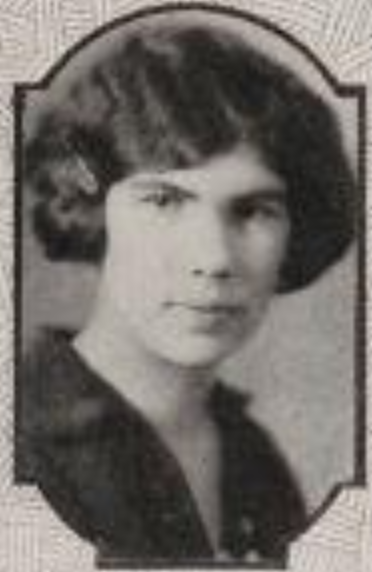
- Antoinette Forrester, from the 1925 yearbook of the University of Chicago
- Born: Antoinette Forrester; July 14, 1904; Paxton, Illinois
- Died: May 9, 2001 (aged 96)

Antoinette Forrester Downing (July 14, 1904 – May 9, 2001) was an American architectural historian and preservationist who wrote the standard reference work on historical houses in Rhode Island. She is credited with spearheading a movement that saved many of Providence's historic buildings from demolition in the mid 20th century and for her leadership was inducted into the Rhode Island Heritage Hall of Fame in 1978.

== Biography ==
Antoinette Forrester was born in Paxton, Illinois, in 1904, to Jay and Myrtle E. (Hartley) Forrester. She grew up in Springer, New Mexico, and developed an early interest in architecture and art. After studying art and English literature at the University of Chicago and receiving her B.A. in 1925, she went on to study architecture at Radcliffe College. She married art historian George Elliot Downing and moved to Rhode Island in 1932, beginning her career as an historical preservationist a couple of years later. After researching the state's historic buildings, she published a survey, Early Homes of Rhode Island (1937). Covering 17th, 18th, and early 19th century houses, it became the standard reference on Rhode Island buildings of those periods.

Downing later worked with the newly formed Preservation Society of Newport County to develop a program to document and publicize the historic buildings of Newport. These efforts resulted in a publication coauthored with Yale architecture professor Vincent Scully, The Architectural Heritage of Newport, Rhode Island (1952). The book won the Alice Davis Hitchcock Award, offered by the Society of Architectural Historians for the year's most distinguished work in architectural history.

In the 1950s and 1960s, Downing focused on preserving buildings in her College Hill neighborhood of Providence. Though many of these buildings were run-down and under threat of demolition to accommodate the expansion plans of Brown University and the Rhode Island School of Design, Downing recognized their historical value and with other area residents organized the Providence Preservation Society to save them. Her report on the neighborhood, College Hill: A Demonstration Study of Historic Area Renewal (1959), was adopted as the blueprint for restoring the neighborhood and led to the founding of the College Hill Historic District. Around 750 houses were restored in the district, and Downing's report became a model for other community-based historic restoration and renewal projects nationwide. As a direct result of Downing's efforts, Providence has one of the most extensive collections of habitable 18th- and 19th-century houses in the United States.

Downing went on to become chair of the Rhode Island Historical Preservation and Heritage Commission in 1968, serving in that capacity for more than three decades. Under her leadership, the commission identified 50,000 historic buildings around the state, some 15,000 of which have been listed on the National Register of Historic Places.

Downing also consulted for the city of New Bedford, Massachusetts, in the 1960s on a project to revitalize the district around the city's famed Whaling Museum.

In the 1970s, she became a board member of SWAP (Stop Wasting Abandoned Property), an organization dedicated to managing urban renewal in ways that do not displace resident populations.

Antoinette Downing died in 2001, aged 96. Her papers are held by the Rhode Island Historical Society.

== Honors and awards ==
Downing's restoration efforts have been recognized by awards from the American Institute of Architects and the National Trust for Historic Preservation. She has received honorary degrees from Brown University, the University of Rhode Island, and Roger Williams College. In 1978, she was inducted into the Rhode Island Heritage Hall of Fame.

In the 1980s, the Antoinette F. Downing Fund was established by the National Trust for Historic Preservation to support historic preservation efforts in Rhode Island. An interview with Downing forms part of the National Historic Preservation Program Oral Histories project housed at Cornell University.

== Personal life ==
Downing's husband, George E. Downing (1904-1977), was chair of the art department at Brown University from 1949 to 1963. The couple had two children, Jay and Grace.
