= Nancy S. Steinhardt =

American architectural historian (born 1954)

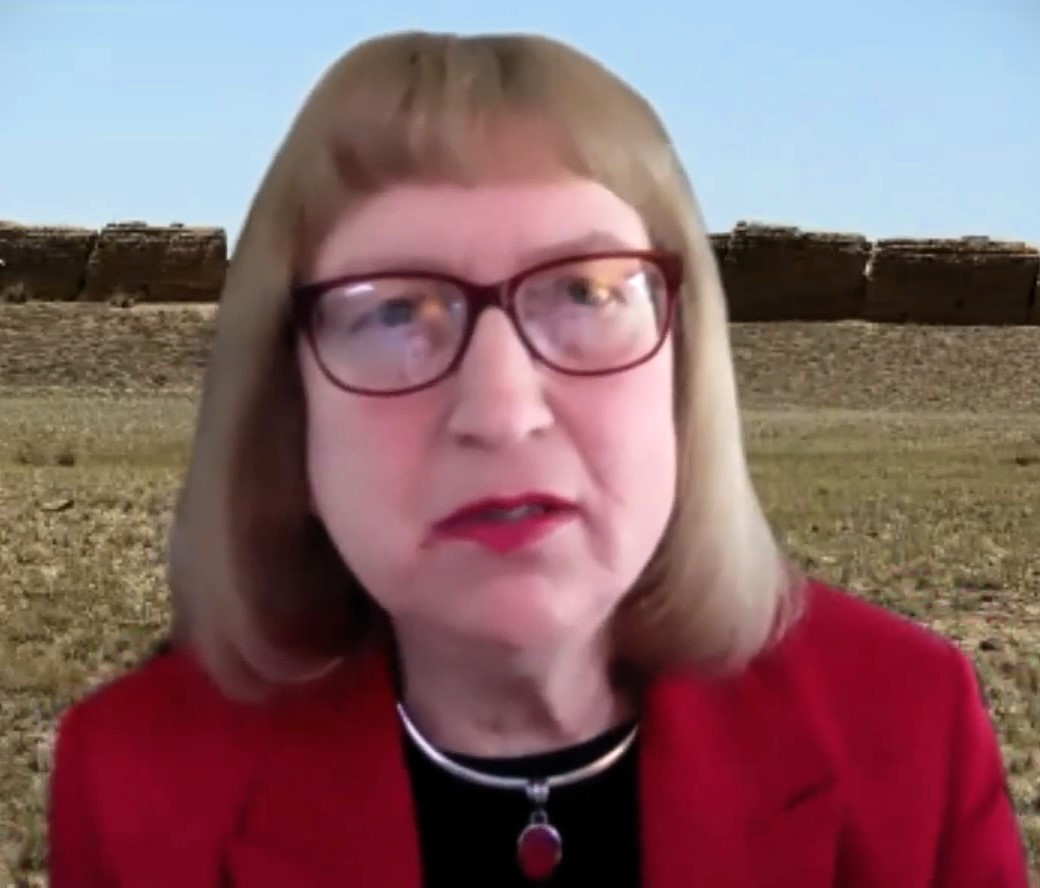
- Steinhardt speaks in 2021
- Born: July 14, 1954 (age 72)

Academic background
- Education: Washington University in St. Louis
- Alma mater: Harvard University (PhD)
- Thesis: Imperial Architecture Under Mongolian Patronage (1981)

Academic work
- Discipline: Chinese architectural historian
- Institutions: University of Pennsylvania

Nancy Shatzman Steinhardt (Chinese: 夏南悉; pinyin: Xià Nánxī, born July 14, 1954) is an American historian of Chinese architecture. Introduced to Chinese architecture by Nelson Ikon Wu, she studied at Harvard University, becoming a Harvard Fellow and receiving her PhD in 1981. She began teaching at the University of Pennsylvania in 1983, and became a curator of the Penn Museum in 1998. She received a Guggenheim Fellow in 2001, and an Alice Davis Hitchcock Award in 2021 for her book China: An Architectural History.

== Biography ==
Nancy Shatzman Steinhardt was born on July 14, 1954. Learning Chinese in her youth, she did undergraduate study at Washington University in St. Louis, where she was introduced to Chinese art and architecture by professor Nelson Ikon Wu. In 1974, she began graduate study at Harvard University. Seeking to explore subjects outside of painting, the typical focus of Chinese art programs in the United States, she studied the temple of Yongle Gong for her master's thesis. She was a Junior Fellow of the Harvard Society of Fellows from 1978 to 1981. She received her PhD in 1981, with her doctoral thesis Imperial Architecture Under Mongolian Patronage focusing on the Yuan dynasty city of Khanbaliq. She began teaching at Bryn Mawr College after receiving her doctorate, concurrently teaching at the University of Pennsylvania the following year.

Leaving Bryn Mawr, Steinhardt became an assistant professor of East Asian art in 1983, replacing Schuyler Cammann upon his retirement. She was able to visit China, previously closed to western academics, for the first time that year. She was promoted to an associate professorship in 1991, and an associate curator of Chinese art at the Penn Museum in 1994. Four years later, she was promoted to professor and curator. She became a Guggenheim Fellow in 2001. She published China: An Architectural History in 2019, for which she received the 2021 Alice Davis Hitchcock Award.

== Bibliography ==
=== Books ===
==== As author ====
- Steinhardt, Nancy S. (1984). Chinese Traditional Architecture. New York: China Institute. ISBN 9780295967905.
- Steinhardt, Nancy S. (1990). Chinese Imperial City Planning. Honolulu: University of Hawaii Press. ISBN 9780824821968.
- Steinhardt, Nancy S. (1997). Liao Architecture. Honolulu: University of Hawaii Press. ISBN 9780824818432.
- Steinhardt, Nancy S. (2014). Chinese Architecture in an Age of Turmoil, 200-600. Honolulu: University of Hawaii Press. ISBN 9780824838225.
- Steinhardt, Nancy S. (2019). China's Early Mosques. University of Edinburgh Press. ISBN 9781474472852.
- Steinhardt, Nancy S. (2019). Chinese Architecture: A History. Princeton University Press. ISBN 9780691191973.
- Steinhardt, Nancy S. (2022). The Borders of Chinese Architecture. Edwin O. Reischauer Lectures. Cambridge: Harvard University Press. ISBN 9780674269576.
- Steinhardt, Nancy S. (2023). Yuan: Chinese Architecture in a Mongol Empire. Princeton University Press. ISBN 9780691253350.
- Steinhardt, Nancy S. (2024). Modern Chinese Architecture: 180 Years. ORO Editions. ISBN 9781961856073.

==== As editor ====
- Steinhardt, Nancy S., ed. (2002). Chinese Architecture. New Haven: Yale University Press. ISBN 9780300095593.
- Mair, Victor H.; Steinhardt, Nancy S.; Goldin, Paul R., eds. (2005). Hawaii Reader in Traditional Chinese Culture. Honolulu: University of Hawaii Press. ISBN 9780824852351.
- Cody, Jeffery W.; Steinhardt, Nancy S.; Atkin, Tony, eds. (2011). Chinese Architecture and the Beaux-Arts. Honolulu: University of Hawai'i Press. ISBN 9780824861018.
- Fu, Xinan (2017). Steinhardt, Nancy S. (ed.). Traditional Chinese Architecture: Twelve Essays. Princeton University Press. ISBN 9780691159997.

=== Articles ===
- Steinhardt, Nancy S. (1983). "The Plan of Khubilai Khan's Imperial City". Artibus Asiae. 44 (2/3): 137–158. doi:10.2307/3249595. JSTOR 3249595.
- Steinhardt, Nancy S. (1987). "Zhu Haogu Reconsidered: A New Date for the ROM Painting and the Southern Shanxi Buddhist-Daoist Style". Artibus Asiae. 48 (1): 5–38. doi:10.2307/3249850. JSTOR 3249850.
- Steinhardt, Nancy S. (1990). "Imperial Architecture along the Mongolian Road to Dadu". Ars Orientalis. 18.
- Steinhardt, Nancy S. (1991). "The Mizong Hall of Qinglong Si: Ritual, Space, and Classicism in Tang Architecture". Archives of Asian Art. 41.
- Steinhardt, Nancy S. (1998). "The Temple to the Northern Peak in Quyang". Artibus Asiae. 58 (1/2): 69–90. doi:10.2307/3249995. JSTOR 3249995.
- Steinhardt, Nancy S. (2001). "Beijing: City and Ritual Complex". Silk Road Art and Archaeology. 7.
- Steinhardt, Nancy S. (2002). "China: Designing the Future, Venerating the Past". Journal of the Society of Architectural Historians. 60 (4).
- Steinhardt, Nancy S. (2003). "Changchuan Tomb No. 1 and Its North Asian Context". Journal of East Asian Archaeology. 4 (1/2).
- Steinhardt, Nancy S. (2003). "A Jin Hall at Jingtusi: Architecture in Search of Identity". Ars Orientalis. 33.
- Steinhardt, Nancy S. (2004). "The Tang Architectural Icon and the Politics of Chinese Architectural History". The Art Bulletin. 86 (2): 228–254. doi:10.2307/3177416. JSTOR 3177416.
- Steinhardt, Nancy S. (2007). "Shishi, a Stone Structure Associated with Abaoji in Zuzhou". Asia Major. Third Series. 19 (1–2).
- Steinhardt, Nancy S. (2007). "Yuan Dynasty Tombs and Their Inscriptions". Ars Orientalis. 37.
- Steinhardt, Nancy S. (2008). "China's Earliest Mosques". Journal of the Society of Architectural Historians. 67 (3): 330–361. doi:10.1525/jsah.2008.67.3.330.
- Steinhardt, Nancy S. (2011). "The Sixth Century in East Asian Architecture". Ars Orientalis. 39.
- Steinhardt, Nancy S. (2014). "Chinese Architectural History in the 21st Century". Journal of the Society of Architectural Historians. 73 (1). doi:10.1525/jsah.2014.73.1.38.
- Steinhardt, Nancy S. (2015). "Transnational Asian Architectural History". Ars Orientalis. 45. doi:10.3998/ars.13441566.0045.006.
- Steinhardt, Nancy S. (2023). "Convergence and Entanglement: Reconsidering the Mongol Architectural Narrative". Journal of the Society of Architectural Historians. 82 (2): 130–149. doi:10.1525/jsah.2023.82.2.130.
- Steinhardt, Nancy S. (2016). "The Pagoda in Kherlen Bars: New Understandings of Khitan-period Towering Pagodas". Archives of Asian Art. 66 (2): 187–212. doi:10.1353/aaa.2016.0016.
- Steinhardt, Nancy S. (2020). "Shoroon Bumbagar". Artibus Asiae. 80 (2).
