= Norma Evenson =

American historian (1928-2021)

- Born: September 3, 1928; Minneapolis, Minnesota, U.S.
- Died: June 7, 2021 (aged 92)
- Occupation: Historian
- Awards: Guggenheim Fellowship (1975); Alice Davis Hitchcock Book Award (1979)

Academic background
- Education: George Washington University; Catholic University of America; American University; Yale University
- Thesis: Chandigarh: A Study of the City and its Monuments (1963)

Academic work
- Discipline: Architectural history; urban history
- Institutions: University of California, Berkeley

Norma Doris Evenson (September 3, 1928 – June 7, 2021) was an American historian of architecture and urban planning. A 1975 Guggenheim Fellow, she won the 1979 Alice Davis Hitchcock Book Award for her book Paris: A Century of Change, 1878-1978 (1979), and she wrote Chandigarh (1966), Le Corbusier: The Machine and the Grand Design (1969), Two Brazilian Capitals (1973), and The Indian Metropolis: A View Toward the West (1989). She was also a professor at University of California, Berkeley for thirty years.

== Biography ==
Norma Doris Evenson was born on September 3, 1928, in Minneapolis. She obtained her BA from George Washington University in 1950 and her MFA from the Catholic University of America on 1951. After a few years as an art teacher and consultant in Montgomery County, Maryland, as well as a year of study at the American University (1957-1958), she went to Yale University, where she got her MA in 1960 and her PhD in 1963. She also worked as a research assistant at the Yale University Art Gallery while doing graduate studies at Yale.

In 1963, Evenson became an assistant professor of architectural history at the University of California, Berkeley, where she was part of the UC Berkeley College of Environmental Design. Kathleen James-Chakraborty said that Evenson was hired in part due to student demand for diversity at UC Berkeley. She was promoted to associate professor in 1969 and full professor in 1972. She retired from UC Berkeley in 1993.

Evenson wrote on urban history, including urban planning in India and Brazil. In 1975, she was awarded a Guggenheim Fellowship to study the era following Haussmann's renovation of Paris. She won the Alice Davis Hitchcock Book Award for her 1979 book Paris: A Century of Change, 1878-1978. She was appointed Fellow of the Society of Architectural Historians in 2009. Other books she wrote include Chandigarh (1966), Le Corbusier: The Machine and the Grand Design (1969), Two Brazilian Capitals (1973), and The Indian Metropolis: A View Toward the West (1989). She also received grants from the American Philosophical Society and Social Science Research Council.

Evenson's personal library of architectural history materials was destroyed in the Oakland firestorm of 1991.

Evenson died on June 7, 2021, in the Washington metropolitan area; she was 92.

== Bibliography ==
- Chandigarh (1966)
- Le Corbusier: The Machine and the Grand Design (1969)
- Two Brazilian Capitals (1973)
- Paris: A Century of Change, 1878-1978 (1979)
- The Indian Metropolis: A View Toward the West (1989)
