= Henry-Russell Hitchcock =

American architectural historian

- Born: June 3, 1903; Boston, Massachusetts
- Died: February 19, 1987 (aged 83); New York City, New York
- Occupations: Architectural historian, professor
- Known for: Founding member of the Victorian Society

Henry-Russell Hitchcock (June 3, 1903 – February 19, 1987) was an American architectural historian, and for many years a professor at Smith College and New York University. His writings helped to define the characteristics of modernist architecture, including helping to coin terms like the International Style.

== Early life and education ==
Henry-Russell Hitchcock Jr. was born in Boston, Massachusetts, on June 3, 1903, the son of Dr. Henry Russell Hitchcock, a physician and graduate of the Harvard Medical School, class of 1890, and his wife, Alice Davis. He was educated at Middlesex School and Harvard University, receiving his A.B. in 1924 and his M.A. in 1927.

== Career ==
=== Educator ===
Hitchcock taught at a number of colleges and universities, but primarily at Smith College, where he was also Director of the Smith College Museum of Art from 1949 to 1955. In 1968, he moved to New York City, where he taught at the New York University Institute of Fine Arts.

He also taught at Wesleyan University, MIT, Yale University, Harvard University, and the University of Cambridge.

While teaching at Wesleyan University in the 1930s, Hitchcock curated an exhibition of Berenice Abbott's photographs of urban vernacular American architecture.

=== Author and historian ===
Over the course of Hitchcock's career, he wrote more than a dozen books on architecture. His Architecture: Nineteenth and Twentieth Centuries (1958) is an exhaustive study of more than 150 years of architecture that was widely used as a textbook in architectural history courses from the 1960s to the 1980s, and is still a useful reference today.

In the early 1930s, at the request of Alfred Barr, the director of the Museum of Modern Art, Hitchcock collaborated with Philip Johnson and Lewis Mumford on the museum's exhibition "Modern Architecture: International Exhibition" (1932). The exhibition introduced the European International Style of architecture to an American audience. Hitchcock and Johnson co-authored the book The International Style: Architecture Since 1922, published simultaneously with the exhibit.

Four years later Hitchcock's book, The Architecture of H. H. Richardson and His Times (1936) brought the career of American architect Henry Hobson Richardson out of obscurity while also arguing that the distant roots of European Modernism were actually to be found in the United States. Hitchcock's In the Nature of Materials (1942) continued to emphasize the American roots of Modern architecture, in this case by focusing on the career of Frank Lloyd Wright.

In 1948, Hitchcock wrote an essay for the exhibition catalogue Painting toward architecture: The Miller Company Collection of Abstract Art.

Hitchcock focused primarily on the formal aspects of design and he regarded the individual architect as the chief determinant in architectural history. Hitchcock's work tended to diminish the role of broader social forces. He has sometimes been criticized for this "great man" or "genealogical" approach.

=== Victorian Society ===
Hitchcock was a founding member of the Victorian Society in Great Britain and an early president of the Victorian Society in America. One of that Society's book awards is the Henry-Russell Hitchcock Award. The Alice Davis Hitchcock Award, awarded by both the Society of Architectural Historians and the Society of Architectural Historians of Great Britain (SAHGB), is named after Hitchcock's mother.

== Personal life ==
According to the historian Douglass Shand-Tucci, Hitchcock was one of several gay men active in the arts and humanities to emerge from Harvard University.

== Death ==
Hitchcock died of cancer on February 19, 1987, in New York City, at age 83.

== Books ==
- 1929: Modern Architecture: Romanticism and Reintegration, Payson & Clarke Ltd., New York
- 1932: (with Philip C. Johnson The International Style: Architecture since 1922, W. W. Norton & Company, New York, second edition 1966; reprint of 1932 edition 1996, ISBN 0-393-03651-0
- 1936: The Architecture of H. H. Richardson and His Times, Museum of Modern Art, New York; second ed. Archon Books, Hampden CT 1961; MIT Press 1966 [paperback]
- 1937: Modern Architecture in England, Museum of Modern Art, New York
- 1942: In the Nature of Materials, 1887-1941: The Buildings of Frank Lloyd Wright, Duell, Sloan and Pearce, New York; Da Capo Press, New York 1975 (paperback), ISBN 0-306-80019-5
- 1952: (with Arthur Drexler) editors, Built in USA: Post-war Architecture, Museum of Modern Art (Simon & Schuster), New York
- 1954: Boston Architecture, 1637-1954; including Other Communities within Easy Driving Distance, Reinhold Pub. Corp., New York
- 1954: Early Victorian architecture in Britain, Yale University Press
- 1955: Latin American Architecture since 1945, Museum of Modern Art, New York
- 1958: Architecture: Nineteenth and Twentieth Centuries, Penguin Books, Baltimore; second ed. 1963; fourth ed. Penguin Books, Harmondsworth England, and New York 1977, ISBN 0-14-056115-3
- 1962: American Architectural Books: A List of Books, Portfolios, and Pamphlets on Architecture and Related Subjects published in America before 1895, University of Minnesota Press
- 1968: Rococo Architecture in Southern Germany, Phaidon, London ISBN 0-7148-1339-7
- 1970: (with others) The Rise of an American Architecture, Praeger in association with the Metropolitan Museum of Art, New York
- 1976: (with William Seale) Temples of Democracy: The State Capitols of the U.S.A., Harcourt Brace Jovanovich, New York ISBN 0-15-188536-2
- 1981: German Renaissance Architecture, Princeton University Press, Princeton NJ ISBN 0-691-03959-3
