= H. Allen Brooks =

Canadian architectural historian and educator (1925 - 2010)

H. Allen Brooks (November 6, 1925 – August 8, 2010) was an architectural historian and longtime professor at the University of Toronto. Brooks wrote on Frank Lloyd Wright and the Prairie School and on the early years of Le Corbusier.

Brooks served as an engineer in the Philippines (1946–47), then pursued his education at Dartmouth College (B.A., 1950), Yale University (M.A., 1955), and Northwestern University (PhD, 1957). After one year at the University of Illinois, Brooks joined the faculty of the Department of Fine Art at the University of Toronto, where he taught until retirement in 1986. He occasionally accepted visiting positions and lectured throughout North America, Europe and Australia.

Brooks became known in the early 1970s for his research on Wright and the Prairie School. The term "Prairie School" has been credited to Brooks. Brooks's first book, The Prairie School: Frank Lloyd Wright and his Midwest Contemporaries (1972), received the Alice Davis Hitchcock Award of the Society of Architectural Historians. He continued to publish on Wright and the Prairie School and received the "Wright Spirit Award," the highest award granted by the Frank Lloyd Wright Building Conservancy.

Brooks also pursued the career of Le Corbusier. His LeCorbusier's Formative Years: Charles-Edouard Jeanneret at La Chaux-de-Fonds, published in 1997, and won a first prize from the Association of American Publishers for books in architecture and urban planning. Brooks was editor of the 32-volume LeCorbusier Archive providing thorough documentation LeCorbusier's practice.

Brooks was a past board member and president, and a Fellow of the Society of Architectural Historians. He was a charter member of the Society for the Study of Architecture in Canada and a life member of the Society of Architectural Historians of Great Britain.

== Writings ==
- Brooks, H. Allen, The Prairie School: Frank Lloyd Wright and his Midwest Contemporaries, University of Toronto Press, Toronto 1972; ISBN 0-8020-5251-7, W W Norton page
- Brooks, H. Allen (editor), Prairie School Architecture: Studies from "The Western Architect", University of Toronto Press, Toronto, Buffalo 1975; ISBN 0-8020-2138-7
- Brooks, H. Allen (editor), Writings on Wright: Selected Comment on Frank Lloyd Wright, MIT Press, Cambridge MA and London 1981; ISBN 0-262-02161-7
- Brooks, H. Allen, Frank Lloyd Wright and the Prairie School, Braziller (in association with the Cooper-Hewitt Museum), New York 1984; ISBN 0-8076-1084-4
- Brooks, H. Allen (editor), Le Corbusier Princeton University Press, Princeton 1987; ISBN 0-691-00278-9
- Brooks, H. Allen (general editor), Le Corbusier Archive (32 volumes), Garland Publishing, New York; Fondation Le Corbusier, Paris 1991; ISBN 0-8240-5050-9
- Brooks, H. Allen, Le Corbusier's Formative Years: Charles-Edouard Jeanneret at La Chaux-de-Fonds University of Chicago Press, Chicago and London 1997; ISBN 0-226-07579-6
- Brooks, H. Allen, The Prairie School, W.W. Norton, New York 2006; ISBN 0-393-73191-X
