= Christine Macy =

Architect and historian

Christine Macy is an architect, historian and the dean of the architecture and planning faculty at Dalhousie University.

She is the author numerous books and publications including Architecture and Nature: Creating the American Landscape co-authored with Sarah Bonnemaison. This book received the Alice Davis Hitchcock Book Award in 2006 from the Society of Architectural Historians. Jon Goss' book review: "This book explores four moments in the changing architectural expression of the relationship between nation and nature in the United States: the closing of the frontier at the end of the nineteenth century and the beginnings of conservation; the economic depression of the 1930s and ideals of a return to nature; the atomic age in the aftermath of the Second World War associated with hubris and paranoia; and ecopolitics in the 1970s and movements for alternative living. For each moment the authors focus on particular buildings that express ideas about nature, although discussion ranges widely over architecture, landscape and urban design, biography, and technological and social context." She also specializes in lightweight structures and public space design for festivals. The book "Festival Architecture" co-edited by Sarah Bonnemaison was reviewed by Freek Schmidt.
