= Susan Casteras =

American art historian

- Born: Susan Paulette Casteras; United States
- Occupations: Art historian Educator; Curator
- Spouse: Eric Schnapper (m. 1976)

Academic background
- Education: Vassar College; Yale University
- Thesis: Down the Garden Path: Courtship Culture and its Imagery in Victorian Painting (1977)
- Doctoral advisor: George L. Hersey
- Influences: Linda Nochlin; Theodore Stebbins

Academic work
- Discipline: Art history
- Sub-discipline: British art
- Institutions: Yale University; University of Washington
- Influenced: Romita Ray

Susan Paulette Casteras is an American art historian, educator, and curator. Casteras is Professor of Art History Emeritus from the University of Washington. She is a specialist on British art, particularly Victorian art and Pre-Raphaelitism.

== Career ==
Born to John and Pauline Troyanovich, Casteras received a Bachelor of Arts in Art History and English Literature from Vassar College in 1971, as summa cum laude and Phi Beta Kappa. She then earned three degrees in Art History from Yale University: a Master of Arts in 1973, a Master of Philosophy in 1975, and a Doctor of Philosophy in 1977. Her doctoral dissertation was on Victorian art, under the direction of George L. Hersey.

Upon graduating, Casteras was appointed Assistant Curator of Paintings at the Yale Center for British Art. In 1991, she was promoted to Curator for five years. Simultaneously, she was also Lecturer of Art History at her alma mater. She then began her professorial career at the University of Washington, where she was named Professor of Art History Emeritus upon retirement.

== Personal life ==
In 1976, Casteras married the lawyer Eric Schnapper.

== Selected works ==
- Images of Victorian Womanhood in English Art, 1987 ISBN 9780838632819
- English Pre-Raphaelitism and its Reception in America in the 19th Century, 1990 ISBN 9780838633281
- James Smetham: Artist, Author, Pre-Raphaelite Associate, 1995 ISBN 9781859281031
- The Grosvenor Gallery: A Palace of Art in Victorian England, 1996 ISBN 978-0300067521

== See also ==
- List of University of Washington people
- List of Vassar College people
- List of Yale University people
