= Diana Kleiner =

American art historian (1947–2023)

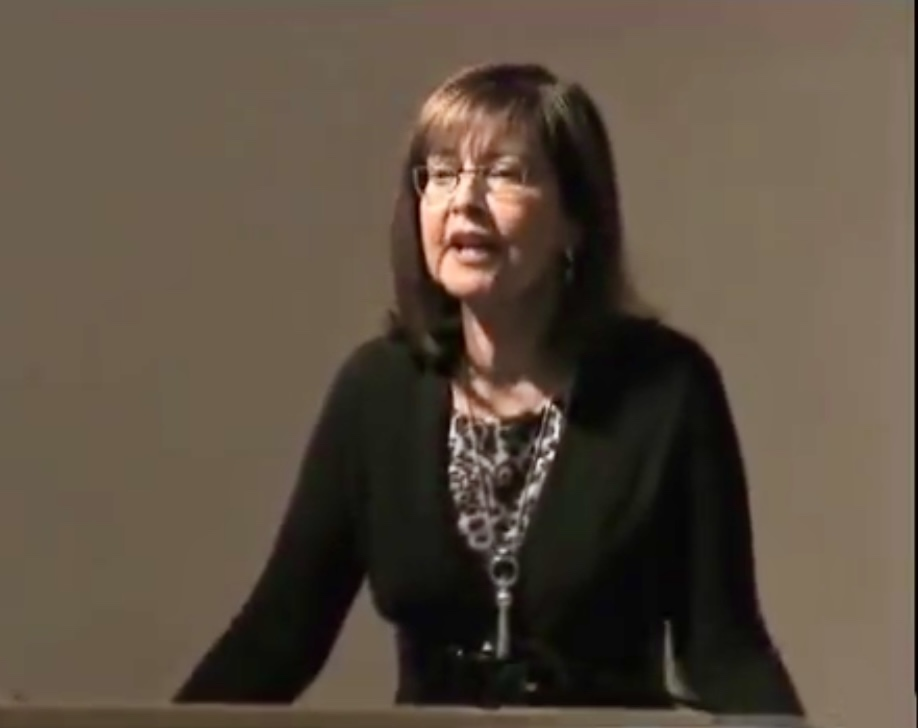
- Kleiner in 2018
- Born: Diana Elizabeth Edelman; September 18, 1947; New York City, New York, United States
- Died: November 12, 2023 (aged 76); New Haven, Connecticut, United States
- Burial place: Grove Street Cemetery, New Haven, Connecticut
- Occupations: Art historian Educator
- Spouse: Fred Scott Kleiner (m. 1972)
- Children: 1 (Alexander)

Academic background
- Education: Smith College; Columbia University
- Thesis: Roman Group Portraiture: The Funerary Reliefs of the Late Republic and Early Empire (1977)

Academic work
- Discipline: Art history
- Sub-discipline: Ancient Roman art and architecture
- Institutions: Yale University
- Notable students: Romita Ray

Diana Elizabeth Edelman Kleiner (September 18, 1947 – November 12, 2023) was an American art historian and educator. A scholar of Ancient Roman art and architecture, Kleiner was the Dunham Professor of the History of Art Emerita at Yale University.

== Career ==
Born in New York City to Morton Henry and Hilda Rachel Wyner Edelman, Kleiner received a Bachelor of Arts from Smith College in 1969. She then continued on to Columbia University to earn degrees in Art History: a Master of Arts in 1970, a Master of Philosophy in 1974, and Doctor of Philosophy in 1977. Kleiner wrote a highly praised doctoral dissertation on Roman funerary art.

Kleiner began her teaching career as a lecturer in art history at the University of Virginia in 1975. A year later, she was named Assistant Professor of Art History at Harvard University. In 1980, Kleiner was hired by Yale University, and was promoted to Associate Professor two years later. In 1989, she became the Dunham Professor of the History of Art, a position held until retirement, when she was named Emeritus. Additionally, from 1995 to 2003, Kleiner was the Deputy Provost for the Arts.

== Personal life ==
In 1972, Kleiner married fellow art historian Fred Scott Kleiner, Professor of Art History and Archeology Emeritus at Boston University. The couple met at Columbia and have one child, Alexander. In 2020, the Kleiners had the Saloni room at the American School of Classical Studies at Athens named in their honor. In 2023 the Kleiners named the Athenian Agora Courtyard Garden and the Hesperia Room at Loring hall, the School's residence hall.

Kleiner died on November 12, 2023, at the age of 76.

In 2024, the fitness room in Loring Hall was named by Fred Kleiner in tribute to his late wife. Kleiner was considered an esteemed member of the American School community.

== Select works ==
- Roman Imperial Funerary Altars with Portraits, 1987 ISBN 9788876890796
- Cleopatra and Rome, 2005 ISBN 9780674032361
- Roman Architecture: A Visual Guide, 2014 ISBN 9780300208016
