= Theodore Stebbins =

American art historian

- Born: Theodore Ellis Stebbins, Jr. August 11, 1938 (age 88); United States
- Occupations: Art historian Curator

Academic background
- Education: Yale University; Harvard University

Academic work
- Influenced: Susan Casteras

Theodore Ellis Stebbins, Jr. (born August 11, 1938) is an American art historian and curator. Stebbins served as the inaugural Curator of American Art at the Harvard Art Museums.

== Career ==
From 1977 to 1999, Stebbins was the John Moors Cabot Curator of American Paintings at the Museum of Fine Arts in Boston. During his tenure, he organized nineteen exhibitions on subjects ranging from 18th century artist John Singleton Copley to The Lane Collection of modern art. As curator, he guided the museum's acquisition of over three hundred paintings, from 17th century limners to Jackson Pollock and Andy Warhol. From 1968 to 1977, he was Curator of American Paintings at Yale University, as well as an associate professor of art history for the university. At Yale, he built the collection of 19th century American landscape and still lifes; his major purchase was Frederic Edwin Church's Mt. Ktaadn (1853).

Complementing his career as a curator and academic, Stebbins served on the board of directors and the Art Advisory Council of the International Foundation for Art Research. He also serves as a trustee for the Heinz Family Foundation, in honor of his high school friend and college roommate, H. John Heinz III. He has been advisor to the Henry Luce Foundation, the Whitney Museum of American Art, the San Francisco Art Museums, the Cleveland Museum of Art, the James McGlothlin Collection, and many other individuals, museums, and foundations. He was advisor to the Kingdom of Spain when it acquired the Thyssen-Bornemisza Collection of American Art. During the 1980s, he served two terms on the Art Advisory Panel of the Internal Revenue Service.

From 2002 to 2015 Stebbins was the Harvard University Art Museum's first curator of American art, while teaching a seminar on the Gilded Age. He published the two-volume scholarly catalog, American Paintings at Harvard (volume two published in 2008 and volume one in 2014). As curator, he brought to Harvard its first paintings by Arthur Dove, Georgia O’Keeffe, and Willem de Kooning, while also overseeing the gift of the Didi and David Barrett Collection of Outsider Art. In 2021 Stebbins and his wife Susan Cragg Stebbins gave their collection of seventy 19th century American works to the Morse Museum of American Art in Winter Park, Florida.

== Works ==
- Life and Work of Martin Johnson Heade, 1975, ISBN 978-0300018080
- American Master Drawings & Watercolors: A History of Works on Paper from Colonial Times to the Present, 1976, ISBN 978-0060140694
- Oil Sketches by Frederic Edwin Church, 1978, ISBN 978-0874748888
- Boston Collects: Contemporary Painting & Sculpture, 1986, ISBN 978-0878462766
- The Lane Collection: 20th Century Paintings in the American Tradition, 1983, ISBN 978-0878462339
- Charles Sheeler: The Photographs, with Norman Keyes Jr., 1987, ISBN 978-0878462858
- The Lure of Italy: American Artists and the Italian Experience, 1760–1914, 1992, ISBN 978-0810935617
- Still Life Painting in the Museum of Fine Arts, Boston, with Karyn Esielonis, Eric Zafran, and Malcom Rogers, 1994, ISBN 978-0878464210
- Weston's Westons—Portraits and Nudes, 1994, ISBN 978-0821221426
- Edward Weston: Photography and Modernism, with Leslie Furth and Karen Quinn, 1999, ISBN 978-0821225882
- The Life and Work of Martin Johnson Heade: A Critical Analysis and Catalogue raisonné, 2000, ISBN 978-0300081831
- The Last Ruskinians: Charles Eliot Norton, Charles Herbert Moore, and Their Circle, with Virginia Anderson and Melissa Renn, 2007, ISBN 978-1891771446
- Life as Art: The Work of Gregory Gillespie and Frances Cohen Gillespie, 2008, ISBN 978-1891771293
- American Paintings at Harvard: Volume Two: Paintings, Watercolors, Pastels, and Stained Glass by Artists Born 1826-1856, with Virginia Anderson and Kimberly Orcutt, 2008, ISBN 978-0300122398
- American Paintings at Harvard: Volume One: Paintings, Watercolors, and Pastels by Artists Born Before 1826, with Melissa Renn, 2014, ISBN 978-0300153521
- Ray Spillenger: Rediscovery of a Black Mountain Painter, Prestel, 2016, ISBN 978-1-4951-8700-1
- Rethinking American Art: Collectors, Critics, and the Changing Canon. David R. Godine, 2025. ISBN 978-1567928341
