= Romita Ray =

Indian-American art historian (born 1970)

- Born: Romita Ray; March 28, 1970 (age 56); Kolkata, India
- Occupations: Art historian Educator; Curator

Academic background
- Education: Smith College; Yale University
- Thesis: The Painted Raj: The Art of the Picturesque in British India, 1757-1911 (1999)
- Doctoral advisor: Esther da Costa Meyer
- Other advisors: Susan Casteras; Diana Kleiner; Jerome J. Pollitt
- Influences: Ann Bermingham

Academic work
- Discipline: Art history
- Institutions: Colby College; University of Georgia; Syracuse University

Romita Ray (born March 28, 1970) is an Indian-born American art historian, educator, and curator. Ray is currently Associate Professor of Art and Music Histories at Syracuse University.

== Career ==
Born in Kolkata to Jyoti and Arundhati, Ray moved to the United States to attend Smith College, earning a Bachelor of Arts in 1992. She then received three degrees in Art History from Yale University: a Master of Arts in 1994, a Master of Philosophy in 1995, and a Doctor of Philosophy in 1999. Her dissertation, under the direction of Esther da Costa Meyer, was titled "The Painted Raj: The Art of the Picturesque in British India, 1757-1911."

Ray began her teaching career as a Visiting Assistant Professor at Colby College in 1998. She spent a year there before joining the University of Georgia as a postdoctoral fellow. In 2000, Ray was named to the joint appointment of Adjunct Assistant Professor of Art History, as well as Curator of Prints and Drawings at the Georgia Museum of Art.

In 2006, Ray joined Syracuse University as Assistant Professor of Art History. A scholar of British India, she is currently Associate Professor of Art and Music Histories.

In 2025, Ray was elected fellow of the Society of Antiquaries of London.
