= Laura Newbold Wood =

American author

Laura Newbold Wood Roper (March 15, 1911 – December 5, 2003) was an American author who also published under the name L. N. Wood. In the 1930s she worked for the Works Progress Administration. She published three biographies for young adults in the 1940s. In 1973 she published a biography of Frederick Law Olmsted. She wrote the first biography ever written about Raymond L. Ditmars.

== Life and career ==
Wood was born in St. Louis, Missouri. She graduated.from Vassar College with an A.B. in 1932. In 1940 she married W. Crosby Roper, Jr. (died 1982).

She published a biography of Frederick Law Olmsted in 1973. A review in the American Historical Review called her book on Olmsted superb and described it as covering new ground as far as his personal interests and role in the reform movement were delved into. The New York Times Book Review published a letter she wrote regarding Olmsted's views on slavery. A review in the Journal of the Society of Architectural Historians praised the book. The Library of Congress and National Library of Australia have a collection of her papers including research notes and correspondence related to her book on Frederick Law Olmsted.

She died in Cotuit, Massachusetts.

== Bibliography ==
- Walter Reed:Doctor in Uniform (1943), J. Messner, New York illustrated by Douglas Duer
- Raymond L. Ditmars: His Exciting Career with Reptiles, Animals, and Insects 1944
- Louis Pasteur 1948
- FLO: A Biography of Frederick Law Olmsted (1973) Johns Hopkins University Press
