= Turpin Bannister =

American architectural historian

- Born: October 1, 1904; Lima, Ohio, U.S.
- Died: March 15, 1982 (aged 77); Williston, Florida, U.S.
- Education: Columbia University; Denison University; Harvard University
- Occupations: Architect; Professor; Historian

Turpin Chambers Bannister (October 1, 1904 – March 15, 1982) was one of the leading American architectural historians of his generation. A long-time professor at the University of Illinois Urbana-Champaign and the University of Florida, he is best known for his work in architectural history, including his work with The Society of Architectural Historians, and editorship of The Journal of the Society of Architectural Historians.

== Biography ==
Turpin C. Bannister was born in Lima, Ohio, in 1904.

Bannister received his bachelor's degree from Denison University in Granville, Ohio, in 1925 and a master's degree from Columbia University in 1928. By his early 20s, Bannister had become highly involved in the national music fraternity Phi Mu Alpha Sinfonia. He was so involved that by 1926 he had served on a national committee to revise the fraternity's Initiation Ritual. The committee was composed of Peter W. Dykema (ΦΜΑ Supreme President), Charles E. Lutton (ΦΜΑ Supreme Secretary), Rollin Pease (ΦΜΑ Supreme Historian), and Bannister. Their revisions to the Ritual paid tribute to the founder, Ossian Everett Mills who had died in 1920.

From 1932 to 1944 he taught at Rensselaer Polytechnic Institute, first as a design instructor and later as an architectural historian. During this time period he was hired by the Federal Writers Project of the Works Project Administration (WPA) to assist in the preparation of the Federal Guide Series book on New York State. From December 1938 to August 1939, and in February 1940, he was employed as an editor and writer. The guide's introductory essay on architecture was written by Bannister.

Bannister was one of the original five or six young scholars who talked informally but earnestly during the 1938 Harvard Summer Session about the formation of a professional organization of architectural historians. The first organized meeting of The American Society of Architectural Historians finally occurred on July 31, 1940, when twenty five charter members elected Bannister the first President, and directed him to edit a Journal. The Society would abridge its name a decade later to The Society of Architectural Historians. The Journal that Bannister published would go on to be known as The Journal of the Society of Architectural Historians. After his initial involvement, Bannister continued to widely contribute to the Journal throughout his career.

Bannister completed his studies at Harvard Graduate School of Design, where he received his Ph.D. in 1944. That year he left Rensselaer and became dean of the Alabama Polytechnic Institute's School of Architecture and Arts in Auburn. In 1948, he moved to the University of Illinois Urbana-Champaign and was Professor of Architecture for ten years, seven of which he served as head of the Department of Architecture. In 1958, he came to the University of Florida and served as dean until 1965 when he suffered a stroke. He died March 15, 1982, in Williston, Florida.

== Associations ==
- Historic America Buildings Survey (past advisory board member)
- Medieval Academy
- National Park Service (past advisory board member)
- New York Historical Association
- Omicron Delta Kappa
- Phi Beta Kappa
- Phi Mu Alpha Sinfonia
- Sigma Chi
- Thornton Society

== Books ==
- An Introduction to Architecture (1937)
- Iron and Architecture: A Study in Building and Invention from Ancient Times to 1700 (1944)
- One Hundred Books on Architecture (1945)
- The Architecture of the Octagon in New York State (1945)
- Evolution and Achievement (American Institute of Architects. Commission for the survey of education and registration. The architect at mid-century; report) (1954)
- Modern Architecture: A Syllabus of Buildings Illustrating the Development of Architecture Since the Mid-Eighteenth Century (1957)
- Medieval Architecture: A Syllabus of Buildings Illustrating the Development of European Architecture from the Fourth Through the Fifteenth Centuries (1959)
- Oglethorpe's Sources for the Savannah Plan (1961)
- A Venture Toward Verity (The Florida Architect) (1963)
- The Constantinian Basilica of Saint Peter at Rome (1968)
