= Anthony Nicholas Brady Garvan =

American academic, cultural anthropologist (1917–1992)

Anthony N.B. Garvan
- Born: October 4, 1917; Raquette Lake, New York, U.S.
- Died: January 10, 1992 (aged 74); Philadelphia, Pennsylvania, U.S.
- Occupations: Professor, cultural anthropologist, architectural historian
- Parent(s): Francis Patrick Garvan (father), Mabel Brady Garvan (mother)

Academic background
- Education: Yale University (B.A., M.A., Ph.D.)

Academic work
- Discipline: Cultural anthropology, American civilization
- Sub-discipline: Material culture studies, decorative arts
- Institutions: University of Pennsylvania, Smithsonian Institution, Winterthur Museum, Garden, and Library
- Notable works: Architecture and Town Planning in Colonial Connecticut (1951) Historical Depth in Comparative Culture Study (1962)

Anthony Nicholas Brady Garvan (1917–1992) was an American academic, cultural anthropologist, and early proponent of what became material culture studies. He was the first Professor and Chair of the Department of American Civilization at the University of Pennsylvania and played a significant role in establishing the field of American civilization as an academic discipline. He was known for his engaging lectures, his focus on studying everyday objects as cultural artifacts, and his transformative impact on students who went on to prominent careers in academia, museums, and the arts.

== Biography ==
Garvan was born on October 4, 1917, at Kamp Kill Kare, in Raquette Lake, New York, to Francis Patrick Garvan and Mabel Brady Garvan. Garvan’s parents were major collectors of decorative and fine art, and Garvan grew up experiencing as the objects of his everyday life items now in museums, significantly, the Mabel Brady Garvan Collection,a 7,000-piece decorative arts collection gifted to Yale in 1930, now housed in the Yale Art Gallery. This exposure heightened his awareness of how objects were viewed and valued differently over time.

Garvan received his B.A., M. A., and Ph.D. degrees from Yale University. His service with the Office of Strategic Services (OSS) during World War II both interrupted and fueled Garvan's academic pursuits. Stationed at Yale, Garvan wrote manuals for U.S. agents sent behind enemy lines. His work with the OSS introduced him to the Human Relations Area Files, a tool for cross-cultural study based on the concept of the artifact as an "index" of culture. Garvan expanded on this tool as a critical framework for his research and teaching.

Like his parents, Garvan was also a collector, primarily of scientific instruments that served as both indexes of prevailing cultures and methods for seeing into objects. His love of beagling, hunting with beagles over the landscape of his home in suburban Philadelphia, led him to collect sporting prints and contributed as well to his understanding of land use, that is, how people behaved in and adapted the places where they lived over time. Garvan died at his home near Philadelphia on January 10, 1992.

== Career ==
After a short period of teaching at Bard College, Garvan was awarded a Rockefeller Foundation Fellowship and in 1950 a Fellowship in American Civilization at Penn, where he spent the remainder of his career. In addition to shaping the department's undergraduate and graduate courses in American Civilization, he was instrumental in creating Penn's museum studies program. He began serving as editor of American Quarterly (AQ) in 1951 when the American Studies Association (ASA) adopted the journal as its official publication, strengthening ties between ASA and Penn.

Beyond academia, Garvan lectured at the Winterthur Museum, Garden, and Library from 1953–1957. He served as Head Curator of the Department of Civil History at the Smithsonian (1957–1960) and as an advisor to the National Portrait Gallery. Active as a consultant and board member with organizations throughout the Philadelphia area, including the Philadelphia Museum of Art, Garvan was a central figure in the planning and orchestration of the Nation's 200th birthday celebrations in 1976. He served on the board of the Library Company of Philadelphia, assuming the presidency from 1986 until his death. Garvan was also deeply interested in preserving the land and historic buildings in New York state, especially in the Adirondacks.

== Intellectual contributions ==
Garvan contributed significantly to the development of American civilization as a discipline by advocating for the close study of everyday objects, a source of data largely ignored by traditional historians. He demonstrated how objects could supply information and insights not found in documents or books, a perspective that extended cultural studies in the U.S. to embrace otherwise overlooked or marginalized communities. He showed museum professionals, fine art collectors, photographers and others that objects embed more than taste, style, fashion, or elite culture. Garvan expanded the Human Area Relations Files to create the Index of American Cultures, a categorized archive of primary materials used for cross-cultural study, as a tool to understand what he defined as a "cultural system." The Index is currently available at Winterthur. A group of related objects demonstrates, Garvan argued, at a particular time and in a particular space, how people thought and lived, their learned repeated behavior characteristic and the socially significant positions within their society.

Garvan was interested not only in how cultural systems differ from one another but also how cultures change over time, especially those that would come to be defined as distinctly American. In Architecture and Town Planning in Colonial Connecticut, which won the medal of the Society of Architectural Historians in 1951, he used the physicality of the Connecticut town as a framework through which to examine religious conflicts, environmental impact, and colonization.

== Legacy ==
Garvan was a cult figure on Penn's campus, attracting standing-room-only audiences to his lectures. His colleague Murray Murphey argued that it was through teaching in the long run that Garvan communicated his insights to others. His "explosive energy" and "creative imagination ...leaped beyond what the rest of us could see". "Blessed with a voice that could shatter glass," he "brought to the classroom an ebullience and an Irish wit which completely captivated his classes." A former student, now tech entrepreneur and consultant on innovation, remembered Garvan's perspective as "seared in my memory, a powerful way to understand the underpinnings of culture in advocating for culture change." Another former student, now a nationally recognized curator of photography, argues "Garvan changed my life. I live by his teaching."

An innovative academic strategy at the time, Garvan designed his courses and the entire museum studies program to provide students with both academic learning and field work, internships, and jobs in which they practiced what they learned. Garvan drew on his personal and professional connections in the Philadelphia area to prepare student to pursue a wide range of careers. The most significant of these connections was his long-term collaboration with Beatrice Bronson Garvan, then Curator of American Decorative Arts at the Philadelphia Museum of Art.

== Selected publications ==
1. Architecture and Town Planning in Colonial Connecticut. Yale University Press, 1951.
2. City Chronicles: Philadelphia's Urban Image in Painting and Sculpture. Bicentennial Corporation, 1976.
3. "Cultural Change and the Planner." Annals of the American Academy of Political and Social Science, March 1964, vol. 352, pp. 33–38.
4. "Historical Depth in Comparative Culture Study." American Quarterly, 1962, vol. 14, no. 2.
5. "Sources for Town Planning Before 1775." Journal of the Society of Architectural Historians, vol. 34, 1975, pp. 308–309.
