= Benjamin A. Elman =

American historian

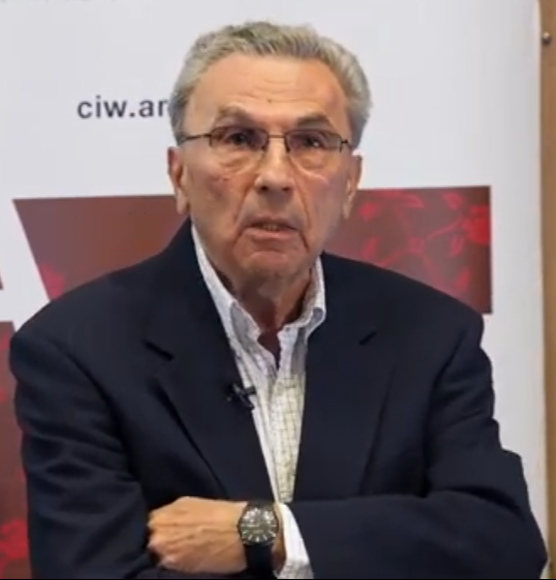
- Giving a lecture at ANU in 2020
- Born: 1946 (age 79–80)
- Occupations: University professor; Sinologist
- Known for: Revisionist views on history of Confucianism and science in China

Academic background
- Education: Hamilton College (BA); American University (MA); University of Pennsylvania (PhD)

Benjamin A. Elman (born 1946) is an American sinologist who is the Gordon Wu '58 Professor of Chinese Studies Emeritus at Princeton University. His teaching and research fields include Chinese intellectual and cultural history, history of science and history of education in late imperial China.

== Academic career ==
Elman earned his B.A. from Hamilton College in 1968. He was in the Peace Corps in Thailand, 1968 - 71 serving as provincial zone office and field supervisor for the Thailand National Malaria Eradication Project in Nakhon Sawan, Uthaitani, Chainat, Kamphaengphet, and Tak provinces along Burmese border. The Peace Corps provided instruction in Thai language and in epidemiological procedures. Upon leaving the Peace Corps, he was with the New York State Department of Public Health, 1972.

Elman earned a Master's Degree from American University, Washington in 1972 - 73. Enrolled in M.A. Program in Area Studies: Modern China. He studied in Taipei, Taiwan through the Inter-University Center for Chinese, in the academic year 1973–74, then the Inter-University Center for Japanese, Tokyo, Japan 1977–78. He received his Ph.D. in Oriental Studies from the University of Pennsylvania (1980), studying with Nathan Sivin and Susan Naquin.

He was Ziskind Lecturer, a short term position, in East Asia Studies at Colby College, Waterville, Maine, 1980–82; University of Michigan, Center for Chinese Studies, 1984– 85; Postdoctoral Research Fellow, Rice University, Houston, Texas, 1985–86. From 1986-2002 he was Associate Professor and full Professor, University of California, Los Angeles. From 1999 to 2001 he was the Mellon Visiting Professor in Traditional Chinese Civilization at the Institute for Advanced Study. He joined the Princeton faculty in 2002. In 2011 he delivered the Edwin O. Reischauer Lectures at Harvard.

== Major publications and research interests ==
- Elman, Benjamin A. (1984). From Philosophy to Philology: Intellectual and Social Aspects of Change in Late Imperial China. Cambridge, Massachusetts: Council on East Asian Studies, Harvard University. ISBN 978-0674325258.
- —— (1991). "Political, Social, and Cultural Reproduction Via Civil Service Examinations in Late Imperial China". The Journal of Asian Studies. 50 (1): 7–28. doi:10.2307/2057472. JSTOR 2057472. S2CID 154406547.
- with Alexander Woodside, ed., —— (1994). Education and Society in Late Imperial China, 1600-1900. Berkeley: University of California Press. ISBN 978-0520082342.
- —— (2000). A Cultural History of Civil Examinations in Late Imperial China. Berkeley: University of California Press. ISBN 978-0520215092.
- —— (2005). On Their Own Terms: Science in China, 1550-1900. Cambridge, Massachusetts: Harvard University Press. ISBN 978-0674016859.
- —— (2006). A Cultural History of Modern Science in China. Cambridge, Massachusetts: Harvard University Press. ISBN 978-0674023062.
- —— (2013). Civil Examinations and Meritocracy in Late Imperial China. Cambridge, Massachusetts: Harvard University Press. ISBN 978-0674724952.

== Reference and further reading ==
- Lu, Hancho (Spring 2005). "Confucianism and Science: A Conversation with Benjamin A. Elman". Chinese Historical Review. 12 (1): 1–24. doi:10.1080/1547402X.2005.11827210. S2CID 151441241.
- Peter Perdue, (review) A Cultural History of Modern Science in Late Imperial China (2006).
- Interview Princeton University, Department of History.
