= Edwin O. Reischauer Lectures =

Series of lectures at Harvard University established in 1986

The Edwin O. Reischauer Lectures is a series of lectures at Harvard University sponsored by the John King Fairbank Center established in 1986 to be given annually in memory of Edwin O. Reischauer. The lectures in Asian Studies are then published by Harvard University Press.

== List of lectures ==
- 2015 Kären Wigen, "Where in the World? Mapmaking at the Asia-Pacific Margin, 1600-1900"
- 2014 Nancy S. Steinhardt, '"East Asian Internationalism and Beyond: The Sixth Century"
- 2013 Shigehisa Kuriyama, "What Truly Matters?"
- 2012 Donald S. Lopez, Jr., "The White Lama Ippolito" Video
- 2011 Benjamin A. Elman, Undoing/Redoing Modern Sino-Japanese Cultural and Intellectual History (2011) links to videos of lectures.
- 2010 Timothy Brook. "For What It’s Worth: Prices and Values in Ming China"
- 2009 Dwight H. Perkins, East Asian Development: Foundations and Strategies (2013 ISBN 0674726138)
- 2008 Susan Greenhalgh, Cultivating Global Citizens: Population in the Rise of China ( 2010 ISBN 9780674055711)
- 2007 Joshua A. Fogel, Articulating the Sinosphere: Sino-Japanese Relations in Space and Time (2009 ISBN 9780674032590) }
- 2006 Leonard Blussé, Visible Cities: Canton, Nagasaki, and Batavia and the Coming of the Americans (2008 ISBN 9780674026148)
- 2001 Alexander Woodside, Lost Modernities: China, Vietnam, Korea, and the Hazards of World History (2006 ISBN 9780674022171)
- 2000 Warren I. Cohen, The Asian American Century (2002 ISBN 9780674007659)
- 1999 G. William Skinner, "Family and Reproduction in East Asia: A Tale of Three Cultures"
- 1997 Gungwu Wang, The Chinese Overseas: From Earthbound China to the Quest for Autonomy (2002 ISBN 9780674009868)
- 1995 Martina Deuchler, Class, Status, and Gender in the Formation of Traditional Korean Society: An East Asian Perspective (2015 ISBN 9780674504301)
- 1993 James Cahill, The Lyric Journey: Poetic Painting in China and Japan (1996 ISBN 9780674539709)
- 1990 Ezra F. Vogel, The Four Little Dragons: The Spread of Industrialization in East Asia (1993 ISBN 9780674315266)
- 1989 Akira Iriye, China and Japan in the Global Setting (1998 ISBN 9780674118393)
- 1988 Robert A. Scalapino, Politics of Development: Perspectives on Twentieth-Century Asia (1998 ISBN 9780674687585)
- 1988 Marius B. Jansen, China in the Tokugawa World (1992 ISBN 9780674184763) ; DeGruyter 2014)
- 1986 Wm. Theodore de Bary, East Asian Civilizations: A Dialogue in Five Stages (1991 ISBN 9780674224063)
