= Buildings of the United States =

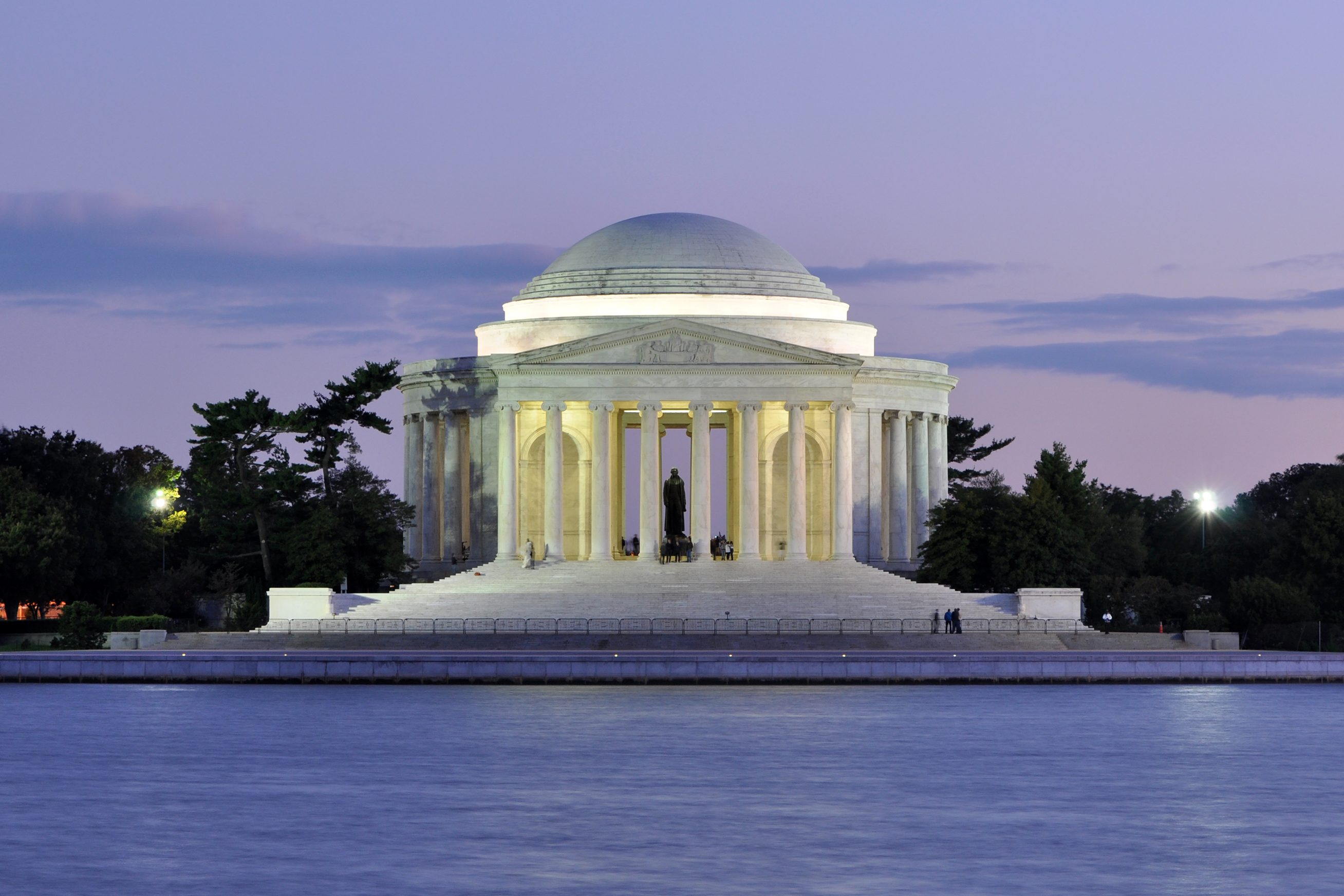
The Jefferson Memorial designed by John Russell Pope was featured on the cover of one of the first books in the Buildings series

Buildings of the United States is a multi-volume series of illustrated reference works. The series focuses on the architectural history and legacy of various States, regions, or metropolitan areas, "identifying the rich cultural, economic, and geographical diversity of the United States as it is reflected in the architecture. . . " The books in the series are intended as a resource for academics, architects, and preservationists, as well as guidebooks for the general public. Each volume is intended to be written by an individual expert or contributing experts. The series is sponsored by the Society of Architectural Historians, having established its editorial board, consisting of academics and representatives of the National Park Service, the Library of Congress, and the American Institute of Architects. As of 2012, the head of the editorial committee is Professor Emerita at Tulane University, Karen Kingsley, Editor-in-Chief and Managing Editor. The Society also coordinates fundraising for the project.

The series is a planned 60-volume work. Work on the series was inspired by Nikolaus Pevsner's Buildings of England guidebooks. The Society has overseen the publication of 27 volumes since 1993. The series first 10 volumes were published by Oxford University Press and since 2006, it has been published by the University of Virginia Press. Its first four volumes (1993) on buildings in Alaska, the District of Columbia, Iowa, and Michigan (2nd ed. 2012) received American publishing awards, and its volumes on Colorado (1997) and Louisiana (2004) have also received honors. The most recent volume is on Missouri (2025).

- Buildings of Alaska (1993)
- Buildings of Arkansas (2018)
- Buildings of Colorado (1997)
- Buildings of Delaware (2008)
- Buildings of the District of Columbia (1993)
- Buildings of Savannah, Georgia (2016)
- Buildings of Hawaii (2011)
- Buildings of Iowa (1993)
- Buildings of Louisiana (2003)
- Buildings of New Orleans, Louisiana (2018)
- Buildings of Missouri (2025)
- Buildings of Maryland (2022)
- Buildings of Massachusetts: Metropolitan Boston (2009)
- Buildings of Michigan (1993, revised 2012)
- Buildings of Mississippi (2021)
- Buildings of Nevada (2000)
- Buildings of North Dakota (2015)
- Buildings of Pennsylvania: Philadelphia and Eastern Pennsylvania (2010)
- Buildings of Pennsylvania: Pittsburgh and Western Pennsylvania (2010)
- Buildings of Pittsburgh (2007)
- Buildings of Rhode Island (2004)
- Buildings of Texas: East, North Central, Panhandle and South Plains, and West (2019)
- Buildings of Texas: Central, South and Gulf Coast (2013)
- Buildings of Virginia: Tidewater and Piedmont (2002)
- Buildings of Virginia: Valley, Piedmont, Southside and Southwest (2015)
- Buildings of Vermont (2014)
- Buildings of West Virginia (2004)
- Buildings of Wisconsin (2017)
