= Vincent Scully =

American art historian (1920–2017)

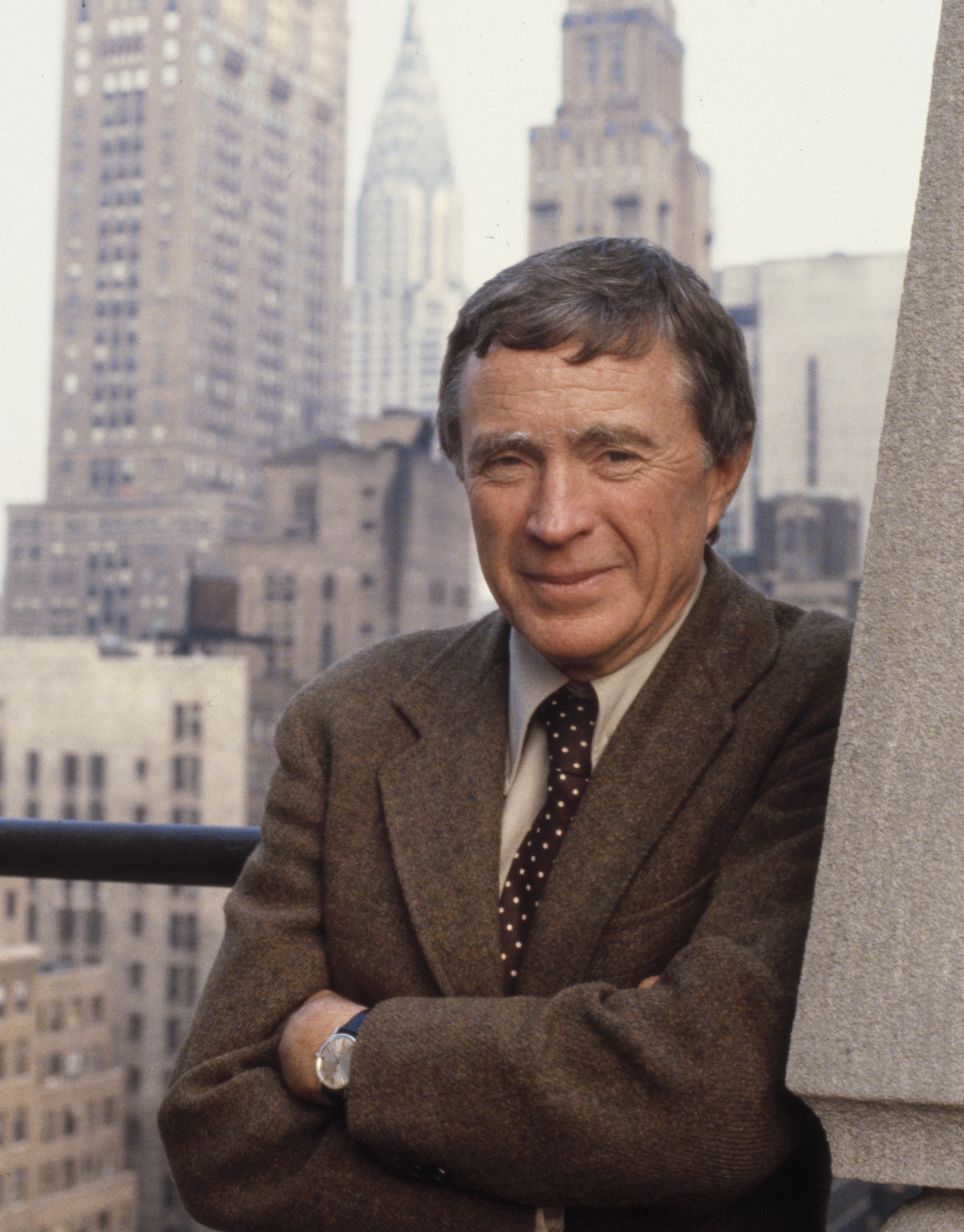
- Scully in 1979
- Born: August 21, 1920; New Haven, Connecticut, U.S.
- Died: November 30, 2017 (aged 97); Lynchburg, Virginia, U.S.
- Education: Yale University (BA, MA, PhD)
- Occupation: Art historian
- Employer(s): Yale University, University of Miami
- Known for: Architectural teacher

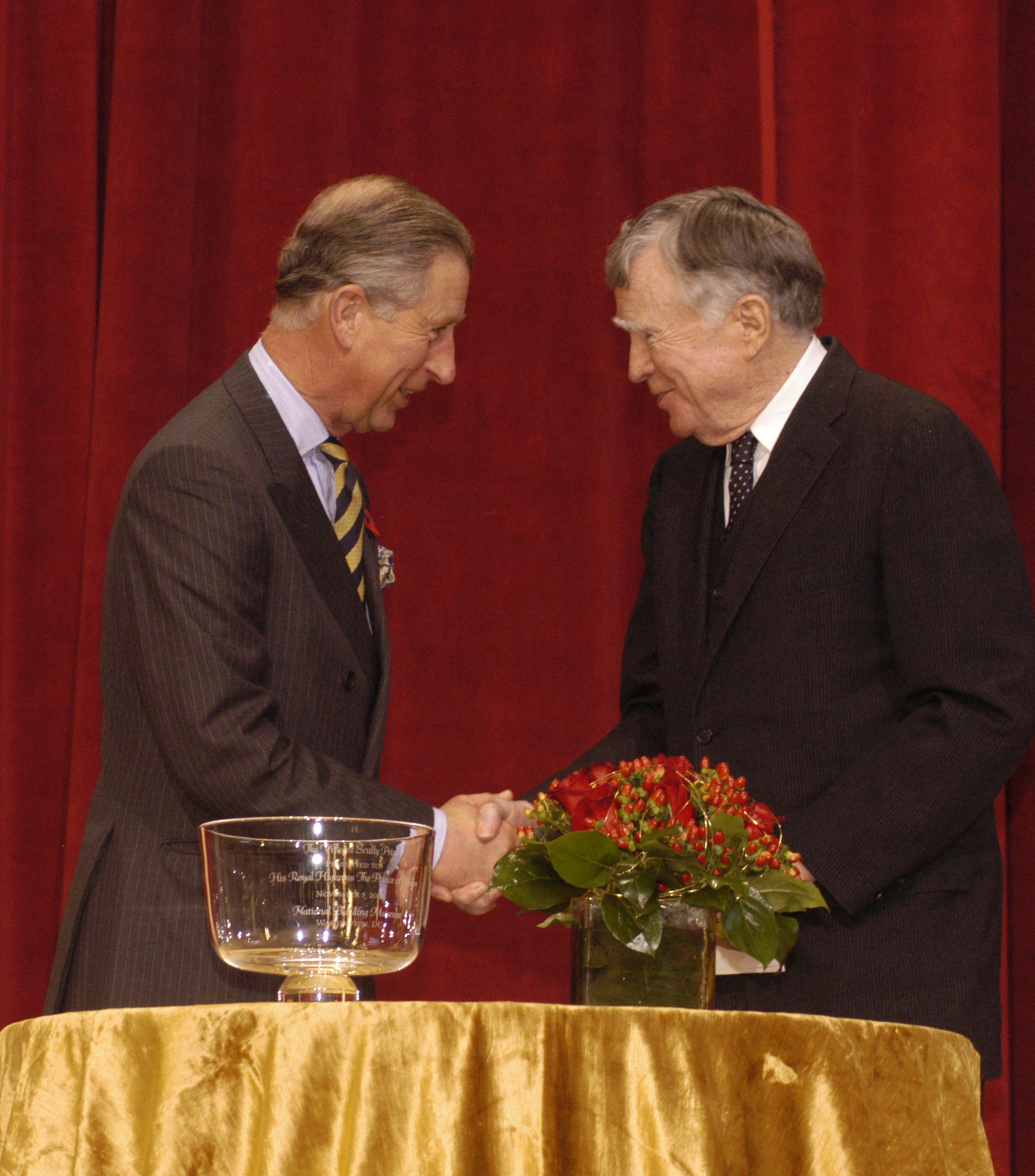
Scully (right) at the National Building Museum hands the 2005 Scully Prize to Charles, Prince of Wales (left)

Vincent Joseph Scully Jr. (August 21, 1920 – November 30, 2017) was an American art historian who was a Sterling Professor of the History of Art in Architecture at Yale University, and the author of several books on the subject. Architect Philip Johnson once described Scully as "the most influential architectural teacher ever." His lectures at Yale were known to attract casual visitors and packed houses, and regularly received standing ovations. He was also the distinguished visiting professor in architecture at the University of Miami.

== Early life and education ==
Born and raised in New Haven, Connecticut, Scully attended Hillhouse High School. At the age of 16, he entered Yale University, where he earned his B.A. in 1940, his M.A. in 1947, and his PhD in 1949. At Yale, he was a member of the Elizabethan Club and a member of Jonathan Edwards College.

== Career ==
He taught at Yale from 1947, often to packed lecture rooms. He was also a distinguished visiting professor at the University of Miami. Scully officially retired from Yale in 1991, but continued giving courses there and at the University of Miami. He announced in 2009, however, at the age of 89, that he was no longer well enough to continue teaching.

Scully's early advocacy was critical to the emergence of both Louis I. Kahn and Robert Venturi as important 20th-century architects. Scully was a fierce critic of the 1963 destruction of New York's original Pennsylvania Station, memorably writing of it that, "One entered the city like a god. One scuttles in now like a rat." Scully was involved in the preservation of Olana, Frederic Church's home in upstate New York, publishing an article on its significance and endangerment in the May 1965 issue of Progressive Architecture.

In 1983, Lorna Pegram produced and directed two films presented by Scully. The films were for the Met and WNET and based around art at the Met.

== Death ==
Scully died on November 30, 2017, at his home in Lynchburg, Virginia, aged 97. The cause of death was complications of Parkinson's disease.

== Awards and honors ==
In 1952, Scully and his co-author Antoinette Downing won the Alice Davis Hitchcock Award for their book, The Architectural Heritage of Newport.

In 1983, Scully delivered the annual A. W. Mellon Lectures in the Fine Arts at the National Gallery of Art.

In 1986, Scully was elected to the American Academy of Arts and Sciences.

In 1993, Scully received the Golden Plate Award of the American Academy of Achievement.

In 1995, the National Endowment for the Humanities chose Scully to deliver the Jefferson Lecture, the U.S. federal government's highest humanities honor. His lecture was on the topic of "The Architecture of Community," a concept that became central to his architectural philosophy.

In 1998, Scully was elected to the American Philosophical Society.

In 1999, the Vincent Scully Prize was established by the National Building Museum to honor individuals who have exhibited exemplary practice, scholarship or criticism in architecture, historic preservation and urban design. Scully himself was the first honoree.

In 2003 the Urban Land Institute awarded Scully its J.C. Nichols Prize for Visionary Urban Development.

In 2004, President George W. Bush presented Scully with the National Medal of Arts, the United States' highest honor for artists and arts patrons. The medal citation read: "For his remarkable contributions to the history of design and modern architecture, including his influential teaching as an architectural historian."

In 2010 the Congress for the New Urbanism awarded Scully its Athena Medal.

in 2010 Scully was awarded the Henry Hope Reed Award.

== Major publications ==
- The Shingle Style: Architectural Theory and Design from Richardson to the Origins of Wright. New Haven: Yale University Press, 1955.
  - Revised Edition. New Haven: Yale University Press, 1971. Title changed to The Shingle Style and the Stick Style.
- Frank Lloyd Wright. New York: G. Braziller, 1960.
- Modern Architecture: The Architecture of Democracy. New York: G. Braziller, 1961.
  - Revised Edition. New York: G. Braziller, 1974.
- Louis I. Kahn. New York: G. Braziller, 1962.
- The Earth, the Temple, and the Gods: Greek Sacred Architecture. New Haven: Yale University Press, 1962.
  - Revised Edition. New Haven: Yale University Press, 1979.
- American Architecture and Urbanism. New York: Praeger, 1969.
  - New Revised Edition. New York: Henry Holt, 1988.
- The Shingle Style Today: Or, the Historian's Revenge. New York: G. Braziller, 1974.
- Pueblo: Mountain, Village, Dance. New York: Viking Press, 1975.
  - 2nd ed. Chicago: University of Chicago Press, 1989.
- New World Visions of Household Gods & Sacred Places: American Art and the Metropolitan Museum of Art, 1650-1914. Boston: Little, Brown, 1988.
- Architecture: The Natural and the Manmade. New York: St Martin's Press, 1991.
- Modern Architecture and Other Essays. Princeton: Princeton University Press, 2002.

A collection of lectures by and about Professor Scully is available at https://www.youtube.com/channel/UC_qSX1XABzVTu68-ou5PWCQ

== Interviews ==
- "An Interview with Vincent Scully by Yehuda Safran and Daniel Sherer", Potlatch 4 (2016).
