= Shigehisa Kuriyama =

Shigehisa "Hisa" Kuriyama (栗山茂久, Kuriyama Shigehisa) is a Japanologist and historian of medicine. He is the Reischauer Institute Professor of Cultural History at Harvard University.

== Early life and education ==
Kuriyama was born in Marugame, Japan. After his family moved for a time to the US, he studied at Phillips Exeter Academy. Subsequently, he attended Harvard for all three of his degrees. He earned an A.B. degree from its Department of East Asian Languages and Civilizations in 1977 and an A.M. degree in 1978. Afterwards, he received three years of training in acupuncture in Tokyo. He earned his Ph.D. at Harvard's Department of the History of Science in 1986 under Barbara Rosenkrantz.

== Career ==
Kuriyama has taught at the University of New Hampshire, Emory University (where he was the Chair for its Institute for the Liberal Arts (ILA)) in Atlanta, Georgia, and the International Research Center for Japanese Studies in Kyoto, Japan.

He authored The Expressiveness of the Body and the Divergence of Greek and Chinese Medicine (1999), a study of the different views of health and medicine held by the ancient Western civilization and Eastern civilizations. This book won the 2001 William H. Welch Medal of the American Association for the History of Medicine.

Kuriyama joined the Harvard faculty as Reischauer Professor in 2005. In 2013 he delivered the Edwin O. Reischauer Lectures, "What Truly Matters."
