= Marvin Trachtenberg =

Marvin Trachtenberg (born June 6, 1939) is an American art historian, Edith Kitzmiller Professor Emeritus of the History of Fine Arts at New York University. His research focuses on late medieval and early modern architecture.

== Career ==
Born in Tulsa, Oklahoma to Russian Jewish immigrants, he received a B.A from Yale University in 1961 and M.A. and PhD from New York University in 1963 and 1967, respectively. He studied under Wolfgang Lotz and Richard Krautheimer.

He spent his entire career at NYU, first as assistant professor (1967-69), then associate professor (1967-76), and eventually professor of fine arts (1976-90) and Edith Kitzmiller Professor of the History of Fine Arts (since 1990).

== Research and publications ==
His research interests are Romanesque, Gothic and Italian Renaissance, historiography, architectural authorship.

== Publications ==
- Dominion of the Eye: Urbanism, Art and Power in Early Modern Florence. Cambridge University Press, 1997.
- Building-in-Time from Giotto to Alberti and Modern Oblivion. Yale University Press, London, 2010.
