= Zeynep Çelik (scholar) =

Turkish born architect, architectural historian, theorist, and academic

Zeynep Çelik is a Turkish-born architect, architectural historian, theorist, and academic. She is Sakıp Sabancı Visiting Professor at Columbia University. She is a retired distinguished professor of architecture at the New Jersey Institute of Technology. Her work focuses on the nineteenth and twentieth century urban history, colonialism, orientalism and modernity.

== Biography ==
She graduated from Robert College in 1970 and obtained her Bachelor of Architecture from Istanbul Technical University Faculty of Architecture in 1975. She received her master's degree from Rice University and her doctorate from the University of California in 1978 and 1985 respectively. Çelik started teaching at the Faculty of Architecture and Design of the New Jersey Institute of Technology in 1991. She retired from NJIT as a distinguished professor of architecture. She is the Sakıp Sabancı Visiting Professor of history at Columbia University. She is a member of the Turkish Academy of Sciences.

== Works ==
- The Remaking of Istanbul: Portrait of an Ottoman City
- Displaying the Orient
- Urban Forms and Colonial Confrontations
- At the End of the Century: One Hundred Years of Architecture with Richard Koshalek
- Empire, Architecture, and the City: French-Ottoman Encounters
- About Antiquities: Politics of Archaeology in the Ottoman Empire
- Europe Knows Nothing about the Orient: A Critical Discourse
