= Kenneth John Conant =

American historian

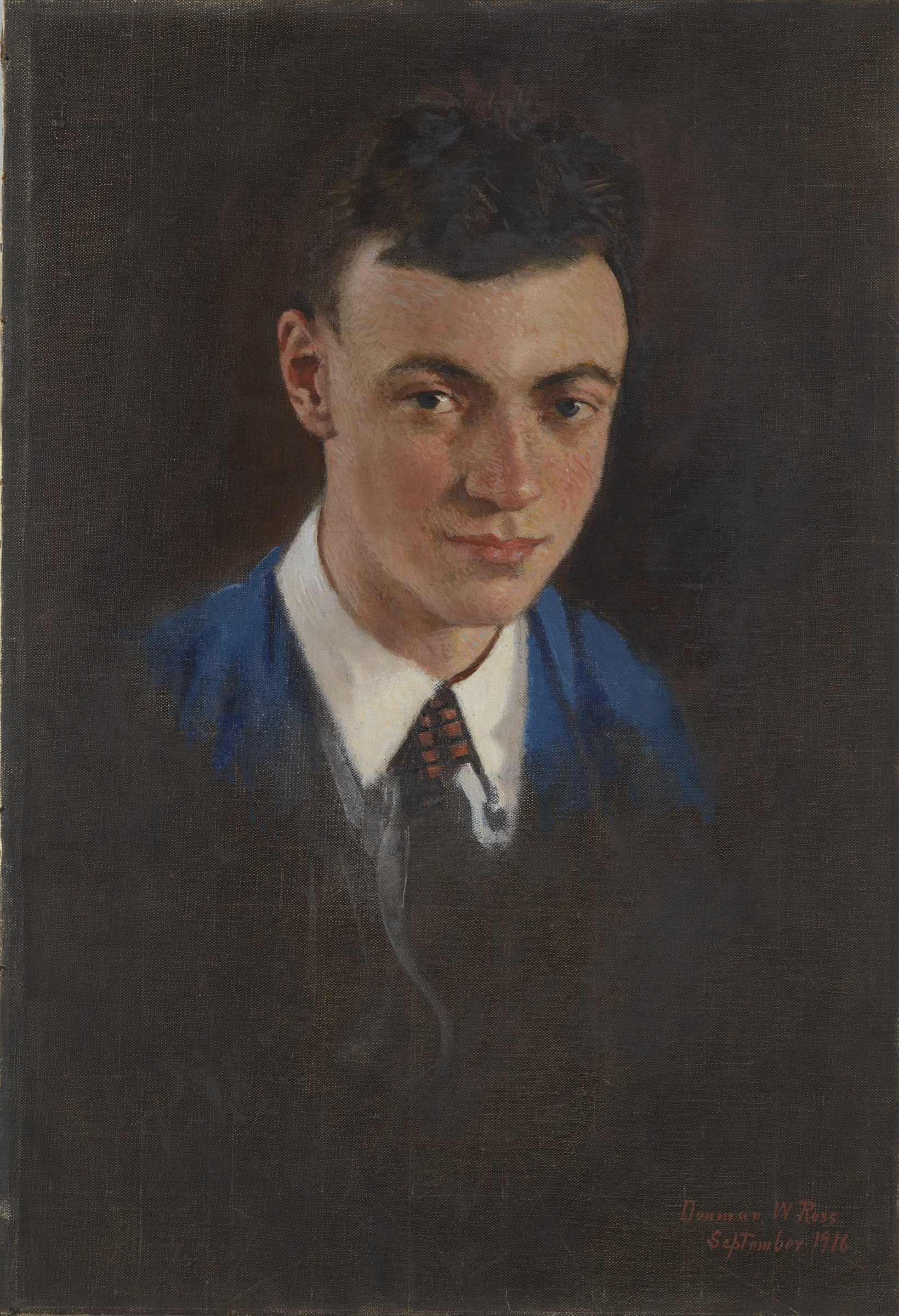
- Painting of Kenneth John Conant by Denman Waldo Ross (1916)
- Born: Kenneth John Conant; June 28, 1894; Neenah, Wisconsin, United States
- Died: March 3, 1984 (aged 89); Bedford, Massachusetts, United States
- Occupations: Architectural historian Educator
- Spouse: Marie Schneider
- Children: 2
- Parent(s): John F. Conant; Lucie Mickelsen
- Awards: Guggenheim Fellowship

Academic background
- Education: Harvard University
- Thesis: The Early Architectural History of the Cathedral of Santiago de Compostela (1925)
- Influences: Herbert Langford Warren; Charles Eliot Norton; John Ruskin

Academic work
- Discipline: Medieval architecture
- Institutions: Harvard University

Kenneth John Conant (June 28, 1894 – March 3, 1984) was an American architectural historian and educator, who specialized in medieval architecture. Conant is known for his studies of Cluny Abbey.

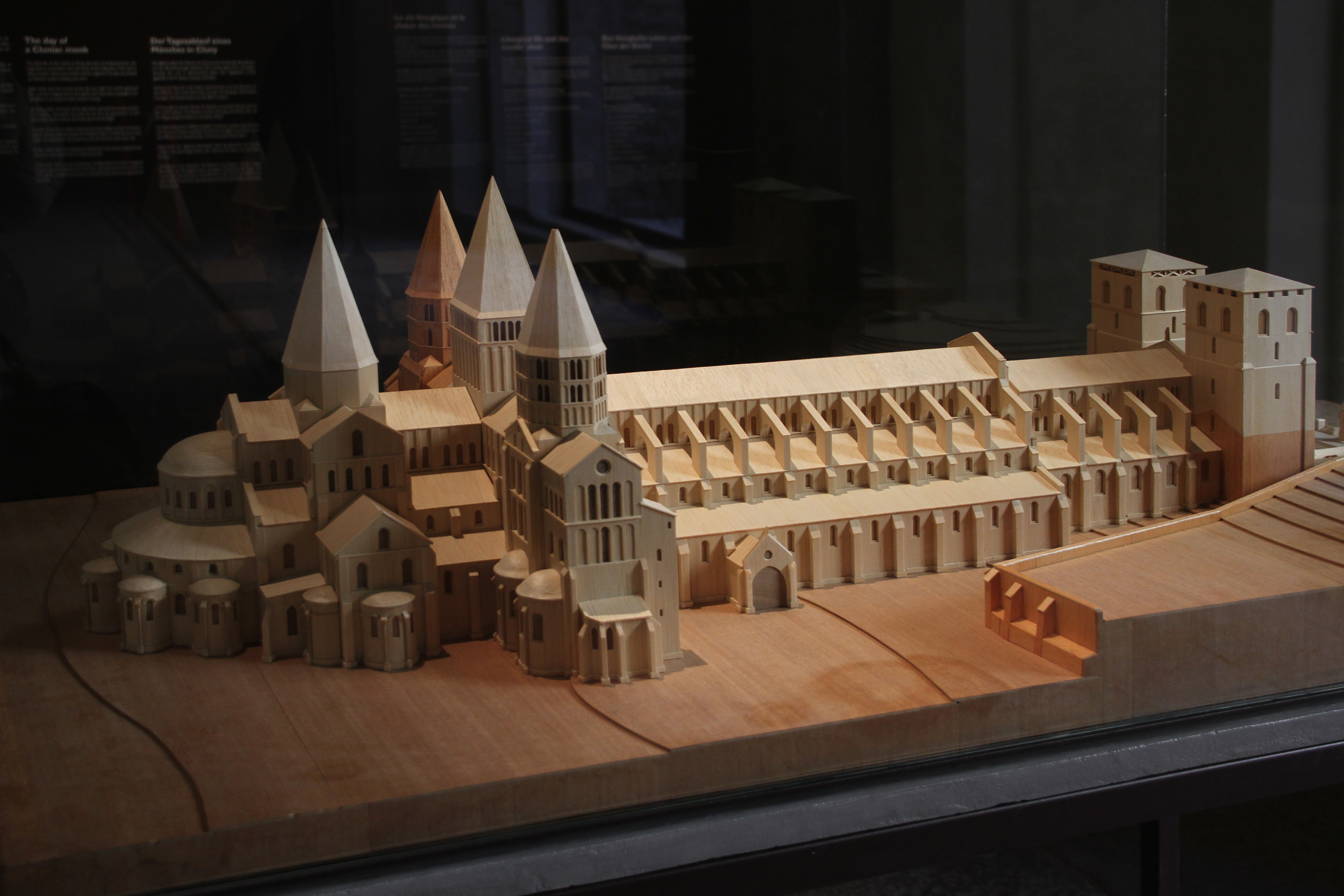
A reconstruction model of Cluny Abbey, based on Conant's research.

== Career ==
Born in Neenah, Wisconsin, Conant received a Bachelor of Arts in Fine Arts from Harvard University in 1915. He was considered the academic heir of Herbert Langford Warren, a teacher at Harvard, and through him, of the art historians Charles Eliot Norton and John Ruskin. He served in the 42nd Infantry Division of the American Expeditionary Force in World War I and was wounded in the Second Battle of the Marne in 1918. Conant later returned to Harvard. His dissertation on Santiago de Compostela Cathedral was published as a monograph in 1926.

Conant's lifework was the study of Cluny Abbey in France, which he excavated beginning in 1927, funded by his first of five separate Guggenheim Fellowships. He considered Cluny the preeminent accomplishment in all of architectural history.

Conant was an elected member of both the American Academy of Arts and Sciences and the American Philosophical Society. He taught architectural history at Harvard from 1924 to 1955, the year of his retirement.

== Legacy ==
In 1916, Denman Ross painted a portrait of Conant, now in the Harvard Art Museums.

In 1940, a group of students, who studied under Conant, formed the Society of Architectural Historians under his influence.
