= Journal of the Society of Architectural Historians =

- Discipline: Architectural history
- Language: English
- Edited by: Claire Zimmerman

Publication details
- Former name: Journal of the American Society of Architectural Historians
- History: 1941–present
- Publisher: University of California Press on behalf of the Society of Architectural Historians (United States)
- Frequency: Quarterly

Standard abbreviations
- ISO 4: J. Soc. Archit. Hist.

Indexing
- ISSN: 0037-9808 (print); 2150-5926 (web)
- JSTOR: jsociarchhist

Links
- Journal homepage

The Journal of the Society of Architectural Historians (ISSN 0037-9808) is a quarterly peer-reviewed academic journal published by the University of California Press on behalf of the Society of Architectural Historians. It was established in 1941 as the Journal of the American Society of Architectural Historians, and was renamed to its current title in the post-World War II period, around 1945. The founding editor-in-chief was Turpin Bannister. The current editor is Claire Zimmerman, a professor at the University of Toronto. The journal's issues include scholarly articles on international topics in architectural history, book reviews, architectural exhibition reviews, field notes, and editorials on the relationship between the built environment, its study, and interdisciplinary topics.
