= Society of Architectural Historians =

Learned society on architectural history

The Society of Architectural Historians
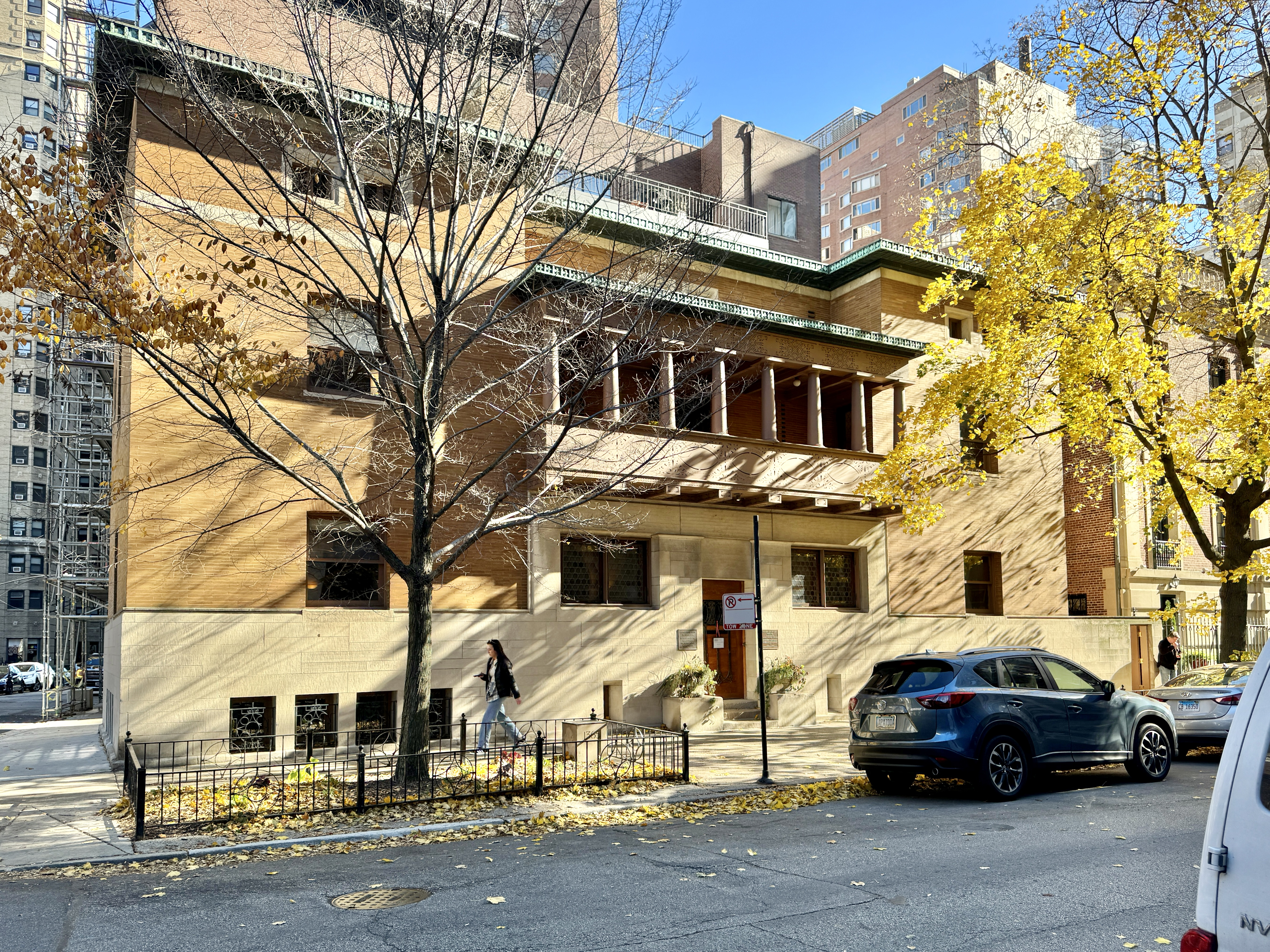
- Charnley House, the Society headquarters
- Established: July 31, 1940
- Address: 1365 N. Astor Street
- Location: Chicago, Illinois, United States
- Website: www.sah.org

The Society of Architectural Historians (SAH) is an international not-for-profit organization that promotes the study and preservation of the built environment worldwide. Based in Chicago, Illinois, United States, the Society's 3,500 members include architectural historians, architects, landscape architects, preservationists, students, professionals in allied fields and the interested public.

It has EIN 20-2507723 as a 501(c)(3) Public Charity; in 2023 it claimed total revenue of $1,467,388 and total assets of $6,854,828.

== History ==
The Society, originally named the Society of American Architectural Historians, was founded on July 31, 1940, inspired by the work of Harvard University historian Kenneth John Conant. Twenty-five chartering members elected Turpin Bannister the first President, and directed him to edit the Journal of the American Society of Architectural Historians. The name was shortened to its current form a decade later. From 1964 to 1966, Robert Branner served as president. SAH is currently the largest academic organization in the field of architectural history in the US.

== Publications and events ==
As part of its mission to "advance knowledge and understanding of the history of architecture, design, landscape, and urbanism worldwide", the Society publishes several works, most noticeably the Buildings of the United States series, as well as a newsletter and the Journal of the Society of Architectural Historians (ISSN 0037-9808). In addition, in association with the University of Virginia, the Society is developing an online encyclopedia of architecture called SAH Archipedia. At present, SAH Archipedia allows free access to entries on 100 of the most important buildings in each state it covers, and is being expanded; SAH members have access to the full version, which includes over 19,000 building histories.

== Awards ==
SAH Publication Awards
Every year, the Society presents five awards honoring the most distinguished publications in architectural history, urban history, landscape history, preservation, and architectural exhibition catalogues. SAH also presents the Founders' Award for an outstanding JSAH article written by an emerging scholar in the previous two years. The Alice Davis Hitchcock Book Award, established in 1949, goes to a North American scholar for the most distinguished work in architectural history. The Philip Johnson Exhibition Catalogue Award awards the best scholarship in the production of materials on an architectural exhibition. The Antoinette Forrester Downing Award goes to a publication's outstanding contributions to the field of architectural preservation. The Elisabeth Blair MacDougall Book Award is for scholarship related to landscape architecture. The Spiro Kostof Book Award recognizes outstanding work on urban design and development history. Finally, the Founders Award is given to the best architectural history article published in the Society journal.
SAH Award for Film and Video
The SAH Award for Film and Video was established in 2013 to recognize annually the most distinguished work of film or video on the history of the built environment. The most important criterion is the work's contribution to the understanding of the built environment, defined either as deepening that understanding or as bringing that understanding to new audiences. A second criterion is a high standard of research and analysis, whether the production was for a scholarly audience, a general audience, or both. A third criterion is excellence in design and production.

== Related organizations ==
Similar and historically related organizations are found in Great Britain, Canada, and Australia/New Zealand: the Society of Architectural Historians of Great Britain; the Society for the Study of Architecture in Canada (SSAC); and the Society of Architectural Historians, Australia and New Zealand.

== See also ==
- SESAH
- Alice Davis Hitchcock Award
- Category: Architectural historians
- James Charnley House
- Society of Architectural Historians of Great Britain
- SAHANZ

== Notes ==
1. SAH's mission statement
