= List of Vassar College people =

This is a partial list of notable alumni and faculty of Vassar College.

== Notable alumni ==
Selected Vassar alumni
(chronologically)

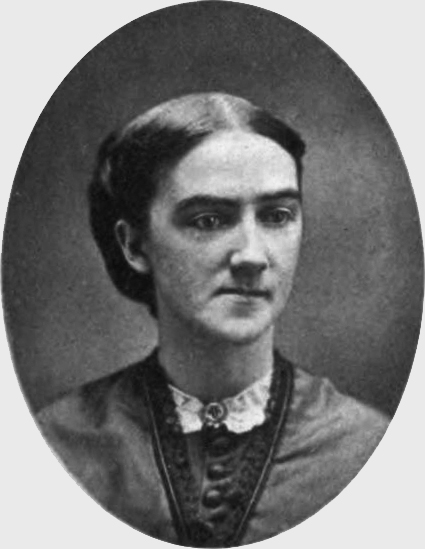
Chemist, first woman to graduate from MIT, Ellen Henrietta Swallow, picture from Class of 1870

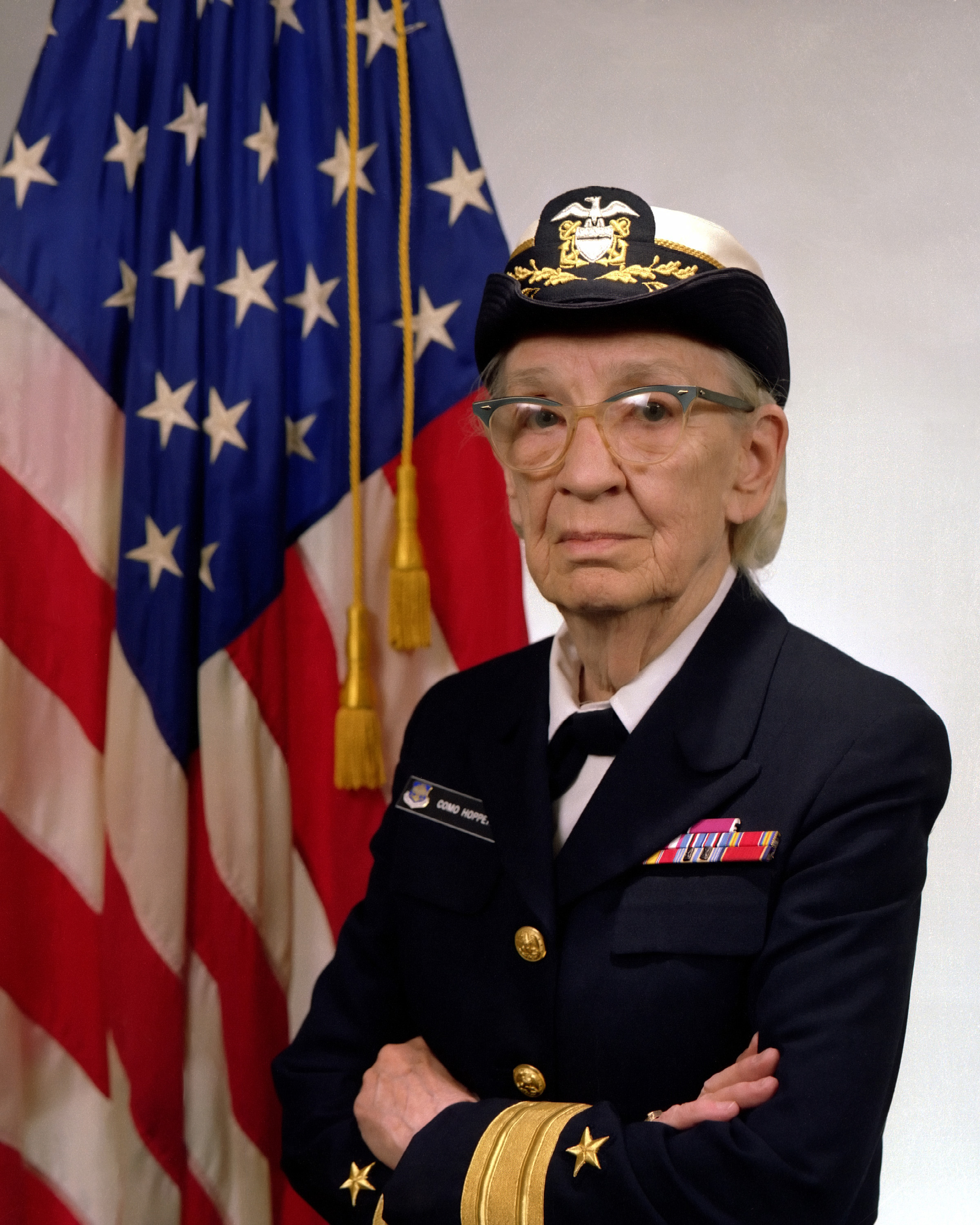
United States Navy Rear Admiral Grace M. Hopper, class of 1928, inventor of the first compiler for a computer programming language

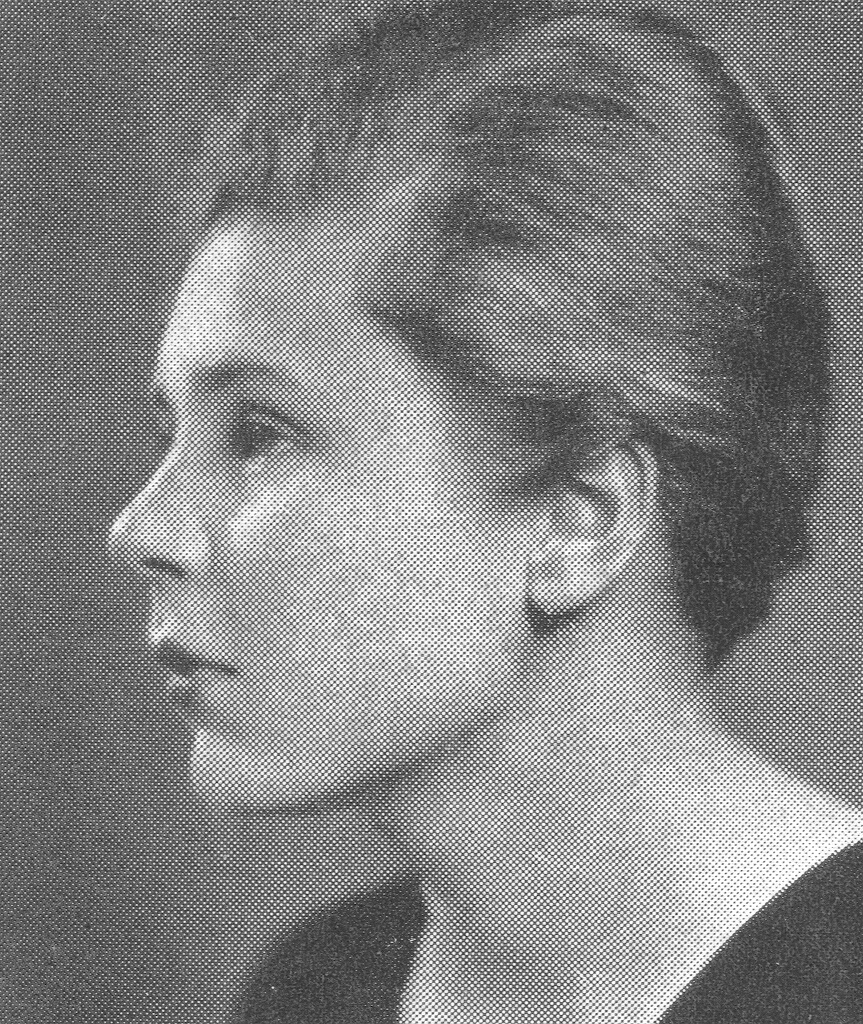
Acclaimed poet Elizabeth Bishop, class of 1934

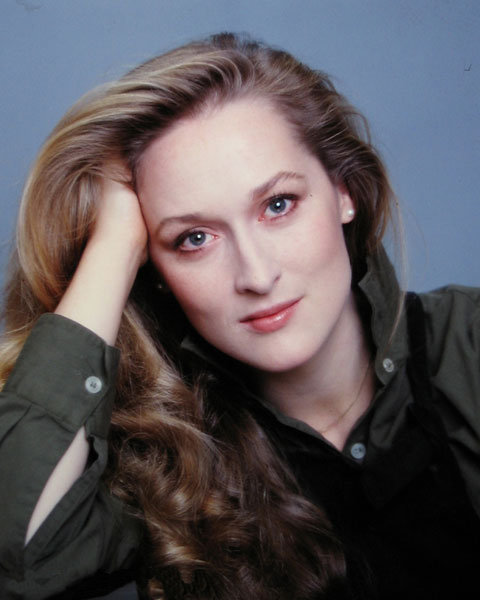
Academy Award-winning actress, Meryl Streep, class of 1971

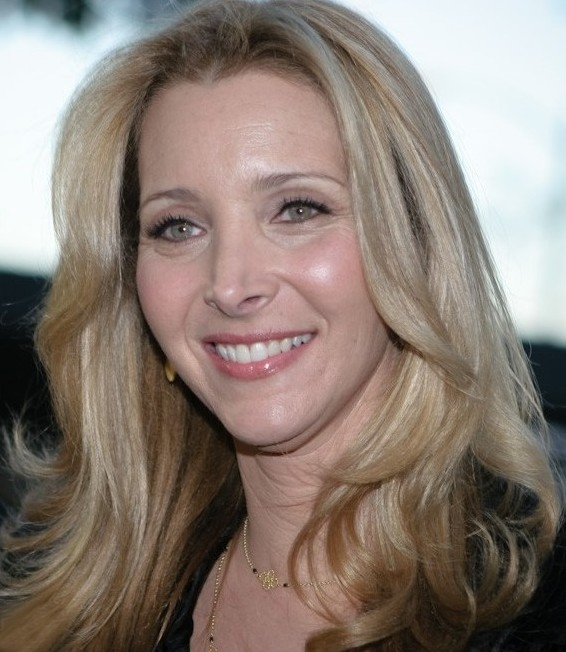
Actress Lisa Kudrow, class of 1985

=== Academics ===
- Jane Kelley Adams, class of 1875 – educator
- Heloise Hersey, class of 1876 – professor of literature
- Emily Jordan Folger, class of 1879 – co-founder of the Folger Shakespeare Library
- Phebe Temperance Sutliff, class of 1880 – president, Rockford College
- Edith Rickert, class of 1891 – medievalist, cryptologist, and novelist
- Anita Florence Hemmings, class of 1897 – Vassar College's first African-American graduate
- Katharine Blunt, class of 1898 – chemist, nutrition researcher, president of Connecticut College for Women
- Scottie Fitzgerald, class of 1942 – writer and journalist, only daughter of novelist F. Scott Fitzgerald
- Ida Hill, class of 1901 – archaeologist, classical scholar and historian
- Belle Turnbull, class of 1904 – poet
- Lisa Grabarek – teacher and Baptist preacher
- Marion Coats Graves, class of 1907 – philosophy, first president of Sarah Lawrence College
- Edith Clarke, class of 1908 – America's first female professor of electrical engineering
- Alice D. Snyder, class of 1909 (A.B.) and 1911 (A.M.) – Vassar College English professor 1914–1943
- Helen Hull Law (1890–1966), class of 1911, college professor of Latin and Greek
- Ruth Wendell Washburn, class of 1913 – educational psychologist
- Sydnor Harbison Walker (1891–1966), class of 1913 – economist
- Chen Hengzhe, class of 1919 – China's first female professor and a pioneer of vernacular literature
- Mildred H. McAfee, class of 1920 – president of Wellesley College and first director of WAVES (Women Accepted for Volunteer Emergency Service)
- Caroline F. Ware, class of 1920 – professor of history at American University and a New Deal activist
- Jean Schneider, class of 1921 – Pulitzer Prize for History winner; research associate of Leonard D. White
- Mary Bunting, class of 1931 – microbiologist and president of Radcliffe College
- Millie Almy, class of 1936 – psychologist and "Grandame" of early childhood education
- Winifred Asprey, class of 1938 – pioneering mathematician and computer scientist
- Laura Sumner, class of 1942 – numismatist
- Nancy Nichols Barker, class of 1946 – professor of history at the University of Texas at Austin
- Jean Briggs, class of 1951 – anthropologist and expert on Inuit languages
- Barbara W. Newell, class of 1951 – first female chancellor of the State University System of Florida, president of Wellesley College
- Eleanor M. Fox, class of 1956 – Walter J. Derenberg Professor of Trade Regulation in the New York University School of Law
- Margaret Dauler Wilson, class of 1960 – professor of philosophy at Princeton University
- Marcia P. Sward, class of 1961 – executive director of the Mathematical Association of America
- Ellen Rosand, class of 1961 – musicologist, historian, and opera critic
- Sau Lan Wu, class of 1963 – particle physicist and the Enrico Fermi Distinguished Professor of Physics at the University of Wisconsin–Madison
- Sandra Lach Arlinghaus, class of 1964 – mathematical geographer; adjunct professor, University of Michigan (Ann Arbor); founder and director, Institute of Mathematical Geography
- Susan W. Coates, MA 1968 – psychologist, Columbia University
- M. R. C. Greenwood, class of 1968 – health scientist, president of the University of Hawaii
- Nancy Dye, class of 1969 – president of Oberlin College
- Jo Ann Gora, class of 1969 – president of Ball State University
- Vera Schwarz, class of 1969 – Freeman Professor of East Asian Studies at Wesleyan University
- Eugenia Del Pino, class of 1969 – developmental biologist; first Ecuadorian citizen to be elected to the United States National Academy of Sciences (2006)
- Susan Casteras, class of 1971 – professor of art history at the University of Washington
- Erica Funkhouser, class of 1971 – poet, professor at MIT
- Christopher W. Morris, class of 1971 – professor and chair of philosophy at the University of Maryland
- Gloria Cordes Larson, class of 1972 – politician and president of Bentley University
- Judith Malafronte, class of 1972 – mezzo-soprano on the faculty at Yale University, winner of the Grand Prize at the International Vocal Competition 's-Hertogenbosch
- Michael Kimmel, class of 1972 – sociologist; distinguished professor of sociology at the Stony Brook University; spokesperson of the National Organization for Men Against Sexism (NOMAS)
- Darra Goldstein, class of 1973 – founding editor of Gastronomica: The Journal of Food and Culture; professor at Williams College
- Molly Nesbit, class of 1974 – modern and contemporary art historian
- Anthony Apesos, class of 1975 – painter and professor of fine arts at the Art Institute of Boston at Lesley University
- Francisco Xavier Castellanos, class of 1975 – director of research at the NYU Child Study Center
- Jane Margaret O'Brien, class of 1975 – professor of chemistry and president emerita of St. Mary's College of Maryland
- Richard L. Huganir, class of 1975 – professor and director of the Solomon H. Snyder Department of Neuroscience; investigator with Howard Hughes Medical Institute
- Iris Mack, class of 1975 – writer, speaker, former MIT professor
- Jeffrey Schnapp, class of 1975 – former director of the Stanford Humanities Lab, faculty director at metaLAB (at) Harvard
- Rochelle Lieber, class of 1976 – professor of linguistics at the University of New Hampshire and co-editor in chief of the Language and Linguistics Compass
- Jyotsna Vaid, class of 1976 – professor of psychology at Texas A&M University
- Carole Maso, class of 1977 – novelist and essayist, professor of literary arts at Brown University
- Jamshed Bharucha, class of 1978 – former president of Cooper Union; cognitive neuroscientist
- Seamus Ross, class of 1979 – dean and professor at the iSchool at the University of Toronto; Founding Director of HATII
- John Carlstrom, class of 1981 – professor at the University of Chicago, MacArthur Award-winning astrophysicist
- Sarah Barringer Gordon, class of 1982 – Arlin M. Adams Professor of Constitutional Law and a professor of history at the University of Pennsylvania
- Heinz Insu Fenkl, class of 1982 – author, professor of English and Asian Studies at SUNY New Paltz
- Matthew Koss, class of 1983 – solid-state physicist and professor
- Valerie Martinez, class of 1983 – poet, retired professor of English and Creative Writing at Ursinus College, New Mexico Highlands University, College of Santa Fe, University of Miami, and founding director of Artful Life
- Mark Burstein, class of 1984 – executive vice president of Princeton University; president of Lawrence University
- Rebecca Reynolds, class of 1984 – poet, administrator and professor at Rutgers University
- Keith Scribner, class of 1984 – novelist, short-story writer, screenwriter, essayist and professor at Oregon State University
- Alison Boden, class of 1984 – author, dean of religious life and the dean of the chapel at Princeton University
- David B. Allison, class of 1985 – distinguished professor, Quetelet Endowed Professor of Public Health, University of Alabama at Birmingham
- Andrea McCarren, class of 1985 – television journalist and educator, first teacher of broadcast journalism at Harvard University
- Tina Campt, class of 1986 – professor of women's studies at Barnard College
- Jennifer Summit, class of 1987 – professor of English, former chair of the Stanford University English Department
- Anne Brodsky, class of 1987 – professor in psychology and gender and women's studies at the University of Maryland, Baltimore County
- Seamus Carey, class of 1987 – president of Transylvania University
- Michael Witmore, class of 1989 – director of the Folger Shakespeare Library
- Steven A. Cook, class of 1990 – Hasib J. Saabbagh Senior Fellow for Middle Eastern Studies at the Council on Foreign Relations
- Greg Hrbek, class of 1990 – author and professor, writer-in-residence at Skidmore College
- Christina Maranci, class of 1990 – researcher, writer, translator, historian, and professor at Tufts University
- Maria Fadiman, class of 1991 – ethnobotanist and associate professor of geosciences at Florida Atlantic University
- Stacey M. Floyd-Thomas, class of 1991 – associate professor of ethics and society at the Vanderbilt University Divinity School
- Daniel Alexander Jones, class of 1991 – performance artist and playwright; assistant professor of theatre at Fordham University
- Sarah Churchwell, class of 1991 – professor of American literature and public understanding of the humanities at the University of East Anglia
- Kate Moorehead, class of 1992 – Episcopal priest and the tenth dean of St. John's Cathedral and the Diocese of Florida
- Matt Donovan, class of 1995 – poet, winner of a Whiting Award, chair of the creative writing department at Santa Fe University of Art and Design
- Erica Field, class of 1996 – economist, professor at Duke University, and winner of the Elaine Bennett Research Prize
- Emily Berquist, class of 1997 – assistant professor of history at California State University, Long Beach, writer, and historian
- Ross Benjamin, class of 2003 – translator of German literature
- Jason Blakely, class of 2003 – political philosopher
- John Figdor, class of 2006 – humanist chaplain at Stanford University
- Helen L. Webster (1853–1928) – philologist and educator, taught at Vassar College 1889–1890 before leaving for Wellesley College

=== Activists and philanthropists ===
- Mary Louise Frost, class of 1866 – peace activist, editor
- Mary Boyce Temple, class of 1877 – preservationist and philanthropist
- Susie Forrest Swift, class of 1883 – editor, Salvation Army worker, Catholic nun
- Ethel Moore, class of 1894 – civic, education, and national defense work leader
- Marion Cothren, class of 1900 – suffrage and peace activist, children's author
- Emma Waldo Smith Marshall, class of 1900 – missionary in Burma, taught Greek at a Baptist seminary
- Gertrude Crocker, class of 1907 – suffragist
- Gertrude Gogin, class of 1908 – YWCA national secretary for girls' programs, 1918–1927
- Eliza Kennedy Smith, class of 1912 – prominent suffragist and government watchdog
- Eleanor Fitchen, class of 1934 – landmarks and environment in New York State
- Lucy Kennedy Miller, class of 1902 – prominent suffragist
- Sylvia McLaughlin, class of 1939 – environmental pioneer
- Patsy Bullitt Collins, class of 1942 – prolific donor and philanthropist
- June Jackson Christmas, class of 1945 – founder of community psychiatric program Harlem Rehabilitation Center
- Anne Hendricks Bass, class of 1963 – philanthropist, art collector, documentary filmmaker
- Phyllis Lambert, class of 1947 – philanthropist and member of the Bronfman family
- Elizabeth Cushman Titus Putnam, class of 1955 – conservationist and winner of the Presidential Citizens Medal
- Barbara Coombs Lee, class of 1969 – activist and president of Compassion & Choices
- Jonathan Granoff, class of 1970 – president of the Global Security Institute
- Jessie Gruman, class of 1975 – author, founder and president of the Washington-based Center for Advancing Health
- Urvashi Vaid, class of 1979 – political activist
- Simon Greer, class of 1990 – president and CEO of Nathan Cummings Foundation, president and CEO of the Jewish Funds for Justice
- Ilyse Hogue, class of 1991 – former president of NARAL Pro-Choice America
- Ronit Avni, class of 2000 – filmmaker, founder and executive director of Just Vision
- Emily Kunstler, class of 2000 – activist and documentary filmmaker

=== Adventurers and athletes ===
- Alice Huyler Ramsey, class of 1907 – first woman to cross the continent driving a car
- Ethan Zohn, class of 1996 – Survivor: Africa winner and philanthropist

=== Artists and architects ===
- Patty Prather Thum, class year unknown (19th century) – painter and art critic
- Elizabeth Coffin, class of 1870 – first person in the United States to receive their Master of Fine Arts
- Ruth Maxon Adams, class of 1904 – architect
- Margaret Burnham Geddes, class of 1929 – architect and urban planner
- Elizabeth Bauer Mock, class of 1932 – influential advocate for modern architecture in the United States
- Louise Serpa, class of 1946– rodeo photographer
- Linda Nochlin, class of 1951 – pioneer in the field of feminist art theory
- Mira Lehr, class of 1956 – artist
- Nancy Graves, class of 1961 – first woman to solo at the Whitney Museum of American Art
- Margaret McCurry, class of 1964 – architect
- Michael Portnoy, class of 1993 – multimedia artist, choreographer, musician, actor and curator
- Phyllis Lambert, class of 1947 – leading architect, creator of the Seagrams building in Manhattan, founder of the Canadian Centre for Architecture
- Mary Ping, class of 2000 – New York based fashion designer
- Faith Holland, class of 2007
- Clancy Philbrick, class of 2008 – contemporary artist
- Alexa Meade, class of 2009 – uses the human body as a canvas
- Terry deRoy Gruber – photographer and author
- Ruth Inge Hardison – sculptor, artist, and photographer; studied music and creative writing
- Ruth Starr Rose – artist, lithographer, and serigrapher

=== Business ===
- Louise Seaman Bechtel, class of 1915 – head of the first children's book department in an American publishing house (Macmillan Co.)
- Martha Firestone Ford, class of 1946 – billionaire, chairman of majority owner of the Detroit Lions, board member of Henry Ford Health System
- Martha Rivers Ingram, class of 1957 – chairman of Ingram Industries, multi-billionaire
- Nina Zagat, class of 1963 – co-founder of Zagat Survey
- Geraldine Laybourne, class of 1969 – creator of Nickelodeon and Nick at Nite; CEO of Oxygen Media
- Paula Madison, class of 1974 – former president of KNBC
- Ken Kaess, class of 1976 – former CEO of DDB Worldwide
- Robert Friedman, class of 1978 – president of Classic Media, New Line TV, and AOL, Interactive Marketing & TV
- Scott Kauffman, class of 1978 – former CEO of MDC Partners
- Phil Griffin, class of 1979 – president of MSNBC
- Lurita Doan, class of 1979 – founder of New Technology Management, Inc.
- James B. Rosenwald III, class of 1980 – co-founder and managing partner of Dalton Investments LLC
- Pamela Mars Wright, class of 1982 – trustee of Vassar College, heir to the Mars fortune
- Mitch Feierstein, class of 1983 – investor, banker and writer
- Yannis Vardinoyannis, class of 1984 – billionaire; founding member of the Super League Greece and president in 2007; executive vice chairman of the independent oil refinery Motor Oil Hellas
- Jeanne Greenberg-Rohatyn, class of 1989 – owner of Salon 94
- Ian Gerard, class of 1990 – co-founder and CEO of Gen Art
- Caterina Fake, class of 1991 – founder of Flickr
- Elisabeth Murdoch, class of 1992 – CEO of Shine Limited, daughter of Rupert Murdoch
- Jon Fisher, class of 1994 – entrepreneur
- Lee Zalben, class of 1995 – founder of Peanut Butter & Co.
- Elisa Strauss, class of 1998 – proprietor of Confetti Cakes, a top New York City-based bakery specializing in custom designed cakes
- Katia Beauchamp, class of 2005 – founder and Co-CEO of Birchbox
- Yu Liu, class of 2008 – founder of One Cloud Technologies, later acquired by Alibaba Group
- Olaf Carlson-Wee, class of 2012 – founder and CEO of Polychain Capital

=== Drama, film, and television ===
- Mary P. Hamlin, class of 1896 – playwright, Hamilton
- Frances Sternhagen, class of 1951 – Tony Award-winning actress
- Zuzana Justman, class of 1954, documentary filmmaker and writer
- Toni Grant, class of 1964 – psychologist and radio host
- Rebecca Eaton, class of 1969 – Emmy Award-winning executive producer of Masterpiece on PBS; listed among Time magazine's "100 Most Influential People in the World" (2011)
- Margaret Lazarus, class of 1969 – Academy Award-winning documentary filmmaker
- Ann Northrop, class of 1970 – journalist and activist; co-host of TV news program Gay USA
- Meryl Streep, class of 1971 – Academy Award-winning actress
- Mary Nissenson, class of 1974 – Peabody award-winning TV news reporter
- Eben Fiske Ostby, class of 1977 – animator, vice president of software at Pixar
- Chip Reid, class of 1977 – CBS chief White House correspondent
- Phil Griffin, class of 1979 – president of MSNBC
- Lloyd Braun, class of 1980 – media executive, president of ABC (2002–2004)
- Marion Lipschutz, class of 1980 – film director and co-founder of Incite Pictures
- Blair Ross, class of 1982 – Broadway theater actor
- Hung Huang, class of 1984 – fashion figure, publisher; listed among Time magazine's "100 Most Influential People in the World" (2011)
- Jon Tenney, class of 1984 – actor
- Sakina Jaffrey, class of 1984 – actress
- Yvonne Welbon, class of 1984 – documentary filmmaker
- Andrew Zimmern, class of 1984 – chef and TV personality
- Lisa Kudrow, class of 1985 – Emmy Award-winning actress
- Jonathan Littman, class of 1985 – multiple Emmy Award-winning producer; president of Jerry Bruckheimer Television
- Hope Davis, class of 1986 – actress
- Dan Bucatinsky, class of 1987 – Emmy Award-winning actor, writer, and producer
- Paul Zehrer, class of 1987 – film and television director, writer, producer, and editor
- Kerri Green, class of 1989 – actress and producer
- Carlos Jacott, class of 1989 – actor and writer
- Saar Klein, class of 1989 – Academy Award-nominated film editor
- Tanya Wright, class of 1989 – actress
- John Gatins, class of 1990 – Academy Award-nominated screenwriter, Real Steel and Flight
- Jonathan Karl, class of 1990 – ABC News senior political correspondent, author
- Liz Cole (1990), NBC television producer and television executive
- Erika Amato, class of 1991 – singer, actress
- Noah Baumbach, class of 1991 – Academy Award-nominated writer, director
- Benjamin Busch, class of 1991 – actor, author, lieutenant colonel in the U.S. Marine Corps
- Stacy London, class of 1991 – television host, author, and magazine editor
- Jason Blum, class of 1991 – producer of films, including Get Out and Academy Award-winning Whiplash
- Eddie Schmidt, class of 1992 – Academy Award-nominated documentary filmmaker
- Catherine Kellner, class of 1992 – actress and producer
- Judd Ehrlich, class of 1993 – director and producer
- Monica Macer, class of 1993 – writer and producer
- Carrie Kei Heim, class of 1994 – child actress, now an attorney
- Erin Daniels, class of 1995 – actress
- Lecy Goranson, class of 1996 – actress
- Ethan Zohn, class of 1996 – Survivor: Africa winner and philanthropist
- Jessi Klein, class of 1997 – Emmy Award-winning writer and comedian
- Angela Goethals, class of 1999 – actress
- Marguerite Moreau, class of 1999 – actress
- Jonathan Togo, class of 1999 – actor
- Matthew Newton, class of 1999 – actor
- Hannah Bos and Paul Thureen, class of 2000 – two-thirds of the devised theatre company The Debate Society and co-creators, writers, and producers of the HBO series Somebody Somewhere
- Justin Long, class of 2000 – actor, Apple Computer spokesperson
- Bradford Louryk, class of 2000 – Broadway artist and actor
- Penny Lane, class of 2001 – documentary director and producer, Our Nixon; assistant professor at Colgate University
- Shaka King, class of 2001 – Academy Award-nominated film producer, screenwriter, and director of Judas and the Black Messiah
- Alexa Alemanni, class of 2002 – actress
- Adnan Malik, class of 2003 – Pakistani actor and filmmaker
- Jonás Cuarón, class of 2005 – co-writer of Gravity
- Grace Gummer, class of 2008 – actress
- Sasha Velour, class of 2009 – winner of RuPaul's Drag Race season 9
- Lilli Cooper, class of 2012 – Tony-nominated actress in Tootsie and SpongeBob SquarePants, The Broadway Musical
- Louisa Jacobson, class of 2013 – actress and model
- Jeff Davis – writer and creator of police procedural drama Criminal Minds and MTV's Teen Wolf
- Thomas Dean Donnelly – screenwriter of films such as Sahara and an upcoming adaption of the Uncharted video games
- Aviva Drescher – television personality
- Tom Gorai – film producer
- Kerri Green – actress, director
- Shaka King – Academy Award-nominated film director, screenwriter, and film producer
- Lisa Lassek – film producer and editor
- Lester Lewis – television writer and television producer, The Larry Sanders Show
- Malinda Kathleen Reese – YouTube personality, actress and singer
- Alysia Reiner – actress in Orange is the New Black
- Jay Severin – commentator and talk radio host
- Ethan Slater – Tony-nominated actor in SpongeBob SquarePants, The Broadway Musical
- Sandy Stern – film producer, known for his work on the films Pump Up the Volume, Being John Malkovich, and Saved!
- Lisa Zane – actress

=== Espionage ===
- Elizabeth Bentley, class of 1930 – American spy for the Soviet Union

=== Fashion ===
- Louisa Gummer, class of 2013, model; daughter of Meryl Streep

=== Music ===
- Elizabeth Bristol Greenleaf, class of 1917 – collector of folk songs
- Jane O'Leary, class of 1968 – musician and composer
- Jamie Broumas, class of 1981 – jazz singer, vocal instructor and arts administrator
- Jonathan Elliott, class of 1984 – classical composer
- Drew Zingg, class of 1981 – guitarist for Steely Dan
- Joseph Bertolozzi, class of 1981 – composer and musician with works ranging from full symphony orchestra to solo gongs
- Amy Powers, class of 1982 – Emmy-nominated lyricist, songwriter and producer
- Alan Licht, class of 1990 – guitarist, composer, writer
- Erika Amato, class of 1991 – singer (Velvet Chain)
- Linda Lister, class of 1991 – soprano, soloist, professor at the University of Evansville
- Howard Fishman, class of 1992 – singer, guitarist, bandleader and composer
- Rachael Yamagata, class of 1996 – singer-songwriter
- Jamie Christopherson, class of 1997 – musician known for scoring movies and video games
- Amanda Forsythe, class of 1998 – soprano; particularly admired for her interpretations of baroque music and the works of Rossini
- Sam Endicott, class of 1999 – singer (The Bravery) and John Conway, class of 2000, keyboardist in The Bravery
- Brian Grosz, class of 1999 – alt-folk musician, member of Skabba the Hut
- Hayley Taylor, class of 1999 – singer-songwriter and actress whose songs have been featured on many popular television shows, including How I Met Your Mother, Royal Pains, and Pretty Little Liars
- The Hazzards – ukulele-based band, best known for their cult hit single "Gay Boyfriend"
- Victoria Legrand, class of 2003 – singer (Beach House)
- Genghis Tron, classes of 2005 and 2006 – band composed of Vassar graduates
- MS MR, class of 2010 – pop duo composed of Max Hershenow and Lizzy Plapinger

=== Politics and law ===
- Harriot Eaton Stanton Blatch, class of 1878 – suffragette and daughter of Elizabeth Cady Stanton
- Mary F. Hoyt, class of 1880 – first woman appointed to the federal civil service
- Ōyama Sutematsu, class of 1882 – first Japanese woman to earn a college degree
- Helen Reed de Laporte, class of 1886 – first woman elected to a board of education in Dutchess County, New York
- Crystal Eastman, class of 1903 – co-author of the Equal Rights Amendment
- Inez Milholland, class of 1909 – suffragist; known as the martyr of the women's suffrage movement
- Elinor Morgenthau, class of 1913 – Democratic party activist and spouse of Henry Morgenthau Jr.
- Catherine Bauer Wurster, class of 1926 – urban housing reformer
- Katherine Elkus White, class of 1928 – Democratic Party politician and diplomat, who served as mayor of Red Bank, New Jersey (1951–1956), chairwoman of the New Jersey Highway Authority (1955–1964), and United States ambassador to Denmark (1964–1968)
- Ann Cole Gannett, class of 1937 – Massachusetts House of Representatives
- Lydia Stevens, class of 1939 – Connecticut House of Representatives (1988, 1990) as a Republican, president of the Greenwich Broadcasting Company
- Emily W. Sunstein, class of 1944 – campaigner, political activist and biographer
- Patricia M. Byrne, class of 1946 – U.S. ambassador to Burma
- Frances Farenthold, class of 1946 – Texas state legislator and human rights activist
- Julie Finley, United States ambassador
- Pauline Newman, class of 1947 – circuit judge, United States Court of Appeals for the Federal Circuit
- Anne Armstrong, class of 1949 – first female counselor to the president; ambassador to the United Kingdom (1976–1977); recipient of the Presidential Medal of Freedom
- Selwa Roosevelt, class of 1950 – chief of protocol of the United States for almost seven years (1982–1989), longer than anyone has ever served in that position
- Sylvia Bacon, class of 1952 – judge of the Superior Court of the District of Columbia; considered by both Richard Nixon and Ronald Reagan as a potential nominee to the Supreme Court of the United States, at a time when no women had yet been appointed to the Court
- Sarah Goddard Power, class of 1957 – Democratic Party activist and University of Michigan Regent
- Patricia Fleming, class of 1957 – first director of the White House Office of National AIDS Policy (ONAP)
- Pamela Ann Rymer, class of 1961 – judge, United States Court of Appeals for the Ninth Circuit
- Julia Donovan Darlow, class of 1963 – attorney and member of the University of Michigan Board of Regents
- Diana Gribbon Motz, class of 1965 – judge, U.S. Court of Appeals for the Fourth Circuit
- Margaret Milner Richardson, class of 1965 – IRS commissioner (1993–1997)
- Bobbie Kilberg, class of 1965 – Republican operative who worked for Presidents Richard Nixon, Gerald Ford, George H.W. Bush, and George W. Bush; president and CEO of the Northern Virginia Technology Council
- Susan Combs, class of 1966 – Texas comptroller of Public Accounts
- Linda Fairstein, class of 1969 – prosecutor in the "Preppie Murder" trial of Robert Chambers and head of sex crimes unit in the Central Park jogger case; author
- Catherine Abate, class of 1969 – New York state senator, president and CEO of the Community Healthcare Network
- Margarita Penón Góngora, class of 1970 – First Lady of Costa Rica (1986–1990); advocate and promoter of the principal Gender Equality Law approved by Congress in 1989
- Betsy McCaughey, class of 1970 – 72nd lieutenant governor of New York (1995–1998), influential critic of Bill Clinton's healthcare proposal
- Linda R. Greenstein, class of 1971 – legislator and politician, New Jersey State Senate, 14th district
- Robert H. Edmunds Jr. – associate justice of the North Carolina Supreme Court
- Vicki Miles-LaGrange, class of 1974 – first African-American woman to become a United States attorney
- Richard W. Roberts, class of 1974 – judge, United States District Court for the District of Columbia
- Nancy Killefer, class of 1975 – government consultant
- Jeffrey Goldstein, class of 1977 – under secretary of the Treasury for Domestic Finance (2010–2011), managing director of the World Bank
- Alison Renee Lee, class of 1979 – South Carolina circuit judge in the Fifth Judicial Circuit; nominee for United States district judge of the United States District Court for the District of South Carolina
- Rick Lazio, class of 1980 – United States representative
- Bala Garba Jahumpa, class of 1980 – Gambian politician and diplomat
- Lee A. Feinstein, class of 1981 – U.S. ambassador to Poland (2009–2012)
- Benson Whitney, class of 1982 – U.S. ambassador to Norway
- Cheryl Kagan, class of 1983 – Maryland House of Delegates (1995–2003)
- Philip Jefferson, class of 1983 – vice chair of Federal Reserve Board
- Sherrilyn Ifill, class of 1984 – president and director-counsel of NAACP Legal Defense Fund
- Marc Thiessen, class of 1989 – White House speechwriter (2004–2009)
- Alfonso H. Lopez, class of 1992 – Virginia state delegate
- Carrie Goldberg, class of 1999 – attorney who specializes in sexual privacy violations
- Deborah L. Wince-Smith – president of the Council on Competitiveness

=== Science and medicine ===
- Christine Ladd-Franklin, class of 1869 – psychologist
- Ellen Swallow Richards, class of 1870 – chemist
- Frances Fisher Wood, class of 1874 – educator and scientist
- Ellen Churchill Semple, class of 1882 – geographer
- Alice G. Bryant, class of 1885 – otolaryngologist and inventor
- Antonia Maury, class of 1887 – astronomer
- Margaret Floy Washburn, class of 1891 – psychologist
- Millicent Todd Bingham, class of 1902 – geographer
- Ruth Benedict, class of 1909 – anthropologist
- Edith Banfield Jackson, class of 1916 – behavioral pediatrician
- Harriet Guild, class of 1920 – physician
- Mary Calderone, class of 1925 – physician
- Frances Lawrence Parker, class of 1928 – geologist and micropaleontologist
- Grace Hopper, class of 1928 – computer scientist
- Grace Lotowycz, class of 1938 – botanist; alpinist; Women Airforce Service Pilots
- Marian Koshland, class of 1942 – immunologist who discovered that the differences in amino acid composition of antibodies explains the efficiency and effectiveness with which they combat a huge range of foreign invaders
- June Biedler, class of 1947 – biomedical scientist
- Vera Rubin, class of 1948 – astronomer
- Beatrix Ann (McCleary) Hamburg, class of 1944 – first African-American admitted to Vassar; psychiatrist, medical researcher
- Lois Haibt, class of 1955 – computer scientist
- Heather Lechtman, class of 1956 – materials scientist and archaeologist; Director of the Center for Materials Research in Archaeology and Ethnology at the Massachusetts Institute of Technology; Macarthur Award winner
- Olga F. Linares, class of 1958 – anthropologist and senior researcher at STRI
- Patricia Goldman Rakic, class of 1959 – neuroscientist
- Bernadine P. Healy, class of 1965 – cardiologist; director of the National Institutes of Health (NIH) (1991–1993), dean of Ohio State University Medical School; president of the American Red Cross (1999–2001)
- Valerie Rusch, class of 1971 – thoracic surgeon, Miner Family Chair for Intrathoracic Cancers and Vice Chair for Clinical Research at Memorial Sloan Kettering Cancer Center
- Ellen Kovner Silbergeld, class of 1967 – engineer
- Alice F. Healy, class of 1968 – psychologist
- Claudia L. Thomas, class of 1971 – surgeon, helped form the Students' Afro-American Society (SAS) and pushed for the Black Studies program at Vassar
- Anne B. Young, class of 1969 – neuroscientist
- Jeffrey Brenner, class of 1990 – founder and executive director of Camden Coalition of Healthcare Providers; 2013 MacArthur Award ("Genius Grant") winner
- Maria Fadiman, class of 1991 – ethnobotanist

=== Writers ===
- Carol Brightman – author
- Celeste Gold Broughton – writer
- Patricia Buckley Bozell – author and publisher
- Marion Hamilton Carter – educator, journalist, author
- Elizabeth Williams Champney, class of 1869 – author of Three Vassar Girls series
- Winifred Kirkland, class of 1897, essayist and novelist
- Adelaide Crapsey, class of 1901 – poet
- Barbara Culliton, science journalist and editor
- Dorothy Deming, nurse and author
- Rebecca Odes – author and co-founder of Gurl.com
- Mary Harriott Norris, class of 1870 – author and dean of women
- Mary Parker Woodworth, class of 1870 – writer and speaker
- Maria Brace Kimball, class of 1872 – educator, elocutionist, writer
- Eva March Tappan, class of 1875 – author
- Amy Wentworth Stone, class of 1898, – children's book author
- Jean Webster, class of 1901 – author of Daddy Long Legs
- Agnes de Lima, class of 1908 – author of Our Enemy the Child
- Elizabeth Page, class of 1912 – author of The Tree of Liberty (1939)
- Edna St. Vincent Millay, class of 1917 – poet
- Nora Benjamin Kubie, class of 1920 – children's writer
- Lois Long, class of 1922 – writer for The New Yorker
- Angelica Gibbs, class of 1930 – short story writer for The New Yorker and novelist
- Marie Rodell, class of 1932 – literary agent and author who managed the publications of much of environmentalist Rachel Carson's writings, as well as the first book by Martin Luther King Jr.
- Mary McCarthy, class of 1933 – novelist, critic
- Elizabeth Bishop, class of 1934 – Poet Laureate of the United States 1949–1950
- Eleanor Ruggles (1916–2008) class of 1938, biographer
- Ruth Stiles Gannet, class of 1944 – author of the My Father's Dragon series
- Shana Alexander, class of 1945 – first female staff writer and columnist for Life magazine
- Sue Kaufman, class of 1947 – author best known for the novel Diary of a Mad Housewife
- Charlotte Curtis, class of 1950 – New York Times editor
- Alexandra Ripley, class of 1955 – writer best known for Scarlett (1991), the sequel to Gone with the Wind
- Jane Kramer, class of 1959 – journalist for The New Yorker
- Mary Oliver, class of 1959 – poet
- Gloria Guardia, class of 1962 – novelist and critic
- Barbara McMartin, class of 1964 – mathematician who became an environmentalist and author of books on the Adirondack Mountains
- Penelope Casas, class of 1965 – food writer, cookbook author and expert on the cuisine of Spain
- Susan Gordon Lydon, class of 1965 – feminist writer known for "The Politics of Orgasm"
- Reggie Nadelson, class of 1966 – mystery novelist and biographer
- Lucinda Franks, class of 1968 – writer for The New York Times and The New Yorker
- Sally Gibson, class of 1968 – author, archivist and heritage consultant
- Mindy Aloff, class of 1969 – editor, journalist, essayist, and dance critic
- Jane Smiley, class of 1971 – novelist
- Esther Friesner, class of 1972 – science fiction and fantasy author
- Paula Volsky, class of 1972 – fantasy author
- Marian Thurm, class of 1974 – author of short stories and novels, has taught Creative Writing at Yale and Columbia
- Elizabeth Spires, class of 1974 – poet and children's book writer
- Paco Underhill, class of 1975 – environmental psychologist and business writer
- Judith Regan, class of 1975 – publisher
- Michael Gross, class of 1975 – writer and editor
- Avery Cardoza, class of 1977 – writer, gambler and publisher
- Lucette Lagnado, class of 1977 – journalist and novelist
- David Wong Louie, class of 1977 – writer and essayist
- Janet McDonald, class of 1977 – writer of young adult fiction
- Michael Specter, class of 1977 – journalist for The New Yorker and The New York Times
- Leonard Steinhorn, class of 1977 – author of The Greater Generation: In Defense of the Baby Boom Legacy; political analyst
- Victoria Strauss, class of 1977 – fantasy and science fiction author
- Josip Novakovich, class of 1978 – writer and professor
- Eric Marcus, class of 1980 – non-fiction writer
- Melissa Holbrook Pierson, class of 1980 – writer and essayist of non-fiction
- Peter Spiegelman, class of 1980 – crime fiction author and former Wall Street executive
- Ned Balbo, class of 1981 – poet
- Heinz Insu Fenkl, class of 1982 – writer, editor and translator
- Kimberly Quinn, class of 1982 – journalist, commentator and magazine publisher and writer
- Matthew Kauffman, class of 1983 – Hartford Courant journalist
- Valerie Martinez, class of 1983 – poet, retired professor of English and Creative Writing at Ursinus College, New Mexico Highlands University, College of Santa Fe, University of Miami, and founding director of Artful Life
- A. V. Christie, class of 1985 – poet
- David Oliver Relin, class of 1985 – journalist and co-author of the book Three Cups of Tea
- Scott Westerfeld, class of 1985 – author of the Uglies series, among other novels
- Thomas Beller, class of 1987 – author
- Evan Wright, class of 1987 – author, best known for Generation Kill
- Mariah Fredericks, class of 1988 – author
- Adam Langer, class of 1988 – author
- Elizabeth Gaffney, class of 1988 – novelist and editor
- Sydney Pokorny, class of 1988 – writer, editor, columnist and activist
- Rebecca Stead, class of 1989 – author of children's literature
- Andy Towle, class of 1980 – blogger and media commentator, editor-in-chief of Genre magazine
- Richard Miniter, class of 1990 – investigative journalist and bestselling author
- Jen Van Meter, class of 1990 – comic book writer best known for her Oni Press series Hopeless Savages as well as series at Marvel and DC Comics
- Nunzio DeFilippis, class of 1991 – with Christina Weir (class of 1992), husband and wife comic book writing team
- Greg Rucka, class of 1991 – comic book writer
- Meghan Daum, class of 1992 – author, essayist, and journalist
- Daphne Kalotay, class of 1992 – novelist, short story writer, and professor
- Christina Weir, class of 1992 – with Nunzio DeFilippis (class of 1991), husband and wife comic book writing team
- Renee Gladman, class of 1993 – author, poet, and visual artist
- Sarah Gray Miller, class of 1993 – editor in chief of lifestyle and decorating magazine Country Living
- Megan Crane, class of 1994 – novelist
- Katherine Center, class of 1994 – author
- Andrew J. Porter, class of 1994 – short-story writer, novelist, and professor
- Joe Hill, class of 1995 – novelist, Heart-Shaped Box; son of Stephen King
- Jeremy Jackson, class of 1995 – author of several novels and cookbooks
- Ryan Singel, class of 1995 – blogger, co-founder of Contextly and Threat Level
- Carolyn Mackler, class of 1995 – author
- Rachel Simmons, class of 1996 – Rhodes Scholar and author
- Taije Silverman, class of 1996, poet
- Owen King, class of 1999 – author; son of Stephen King
- Melissa Walker, class of 1999 – author
- Stephen Motika, class of 1999 – poet, editor, and publisher
- Jesse Ball, class of 2000 – poet and author
- Shaenon K. Garrity, class of 2000 – webcomics writer and artist
- Aimee Friedman, class of 2001 – writer of young adult fiction
- Alexandra Berzon, class of 2001 – writer
- Chelsey Philpot, class of 2005 – author of EVEN IN PARADISE
- Shelby Bach, class of 2008 – author
- M.J. Alexander
- Augusta Clawson
- Geri Doran – poet
- Alexis Landau - novelist
- Michael Scharf – poet and critic
- Jane Mead – writer
- Delia Sherman – fantasy writer and editor
- Kimberly McCreight – author and lawyer
- Rosianna Halse Rojas – writer, video blogger, social media manager and online personality
- Ruby Walworth – poet, suffragist, and nurse
- Michael Wolff, class of 1975 – author of Fire and Fury
- Amy Wilensky, class of 1992 – writer of memoirs

=== Attended, but did not graduate ===
- June Arnold (graduated from Rice University) – author and publisher
- Anthony Bourdain (graduated from The Culinary Institute of America) – chef, writer
- Janet Cooke – journalist forced to return a Pulitzer Prize for a fabricated story (claimed to have had a degree but did not)
- Mike D (Michael Diamond) – rapper (Beastie Boys)
- Jane Fonda (graduated from The Actors Studio) – actress
- Katharine Graham (graduated from the University of Chicago) – publisher of The Washington Post
- Anne Hathaway (graduated from New York University) – actress
- Jacqueline Kennedy Onassis (graduated from George Washington University) – First Lady
- Mark Ronson – DJ
- Curtis Sittenfeld (graduated from Stanford University) – author
- Anne-Marie O'Connor (graduated from University of California at Berkeley) – journalist, author of The Lady in Gold, the Extraordinary Tale of Gustav Klimt's Masterpiece, Portrait of Adele Bloch-Bauer
- Neil Strauss (graduated from Columbia College) – author and journalist
- Rachael Yamagata (graduated from Northwestern University) – singer

=== Fictional ===
As a famous and historically important college, Vassar has attracted much attention in fictional works. A partial list of cultural references to Vassar can be found here: Vassar College in popular culture.

== Faculty ==
=== Anthropology Department ===
- Martha Warren Beckwith
- Ruth Benedict
- Martha Kaplan
- Margaret Mead – visiting lecturer
- Colin Turnbull – visiting lecturer

=== Art Department ===
- Leila Cook Barber – art historian
- Alfred H. Barr Jr.
- C.K. Chatterton
- Gregory Crewdson
- Richard Krautheimer
- Brian Lukacher
- Elias Lyman Magoon – visiting lecturer
- Molly Nesbit
- Linda Nochlin
- Lewis Pilcher
- Harry Roseman
- Concetta Scaravaglione
- Carolee Schneemann – visiting lecturer
- Andrew Tallon
- Oliver Samuel Tonks
- Henry Van Ingen

=== Dance Department ===
- Miriam Mahdaviani
- John Meehan

=== Drama Department ===
- Jean Arthur
- Larry Atlas
- Catherine Filloux
- Hallie Flanagan
- Shona Tucker

=== English Department ===
- Donald Foster
- Eamon Grennan
- Hua Hsu
- Michael Joyce
- Amitava Kumar
- Kiese Laymon
- Thomas Mallon
- Gabriela Mistral
- Mary Mitchell
- Paul Russell
- Nancy Willard

=== History Department ===
- Robert K. Brigham
- James H. Merrell
- Lucy Maynard Salmon

=== Mathematics Department ===
- Winifred Asprey
- Louise Duffield Cummings
- Grace Hopper

=== Music Department ===
- Gustav Dannreuther
- Karen Holvik
- Ernst Krenek
- Annea Lockwood
- Harold Meltzer
- Quincy Porter
- John Solum
- Richard Wilson

=== Philosophy Department ===
- Giovanna Borradori
- David Kelley
- Mitchell Miller
- Uma Narayan

=== Physics and Astronomy Department ===
- Debra Elmegreen
- Caroline Furness
- Maud Worcester Makemson
- Maria Mitchell
- Mary Watson Whitney

=== Political Science Department ===
- Mary Lyndon Shanley
- Peter Stillman

=== Psychology Department ===
- Margaret Floy Washburn
- Diana Zuckerman

=== Other departments ===
- Alida Avery – Physiology and Hygiene
- Harriet Isabel Ballintine – Athletics and Physical Education
- Mark Dion – visiting lecturer
- Liza Donnelly – The New Yorker staff cartoonist; American Culture and Women's Studies
- Heinz Insu Fenkl – writer, editor, folklorist, and translator; visiting faculty
- Louise Holland – academic, philologist and archaeologist
- Geoffrey A. Jehle – Economics
- Abby Leach – Greek
- Hannah Lyman – first female principal of Vassar College
- Richard Möller – coach of the soccer team
- Margaret Good Myers – Economics
- Joseph Nevins – Geography
- Mabel Newcomer – Economics
- Aaron Louis Treadwell – Zoology
- Adelaide Underhill – librarian
- Helen Worthing Webster – Physiology and Hygiene
