= Jehle (surname) =

Jehle is a surname. Notable people with the name include:

- Geoffrey A. Jehle, American professor of economics
- Gustav Jehle (1908–1991), Mayor of Planken
- Herbert Jehle (1907–1983), German-American physicist
- Johannes A. Jehle (born 1961), German biologist
- Joseph Jehle (fl. 1920), Swiss sports shooter
- Peter Jehle (born 1982), Liechtensteiner footballer
- Rudolf Jehle (born 1894), Liechtensteiner sports shooter
- Tobias Jehle (1885–1978), Liechtenstein politician
- Xavier Jehle, founder of Jehle automotive company in Liechtenstein
