= Claudia Thomas =

Claudia Thomas may refer to

- Claudia L. Thomas, African-American orthopedic surgeon
- Claudia Kolb (married name Claudia Thomas, born 1949), American swimmer
