= Vassar College in popular culture =

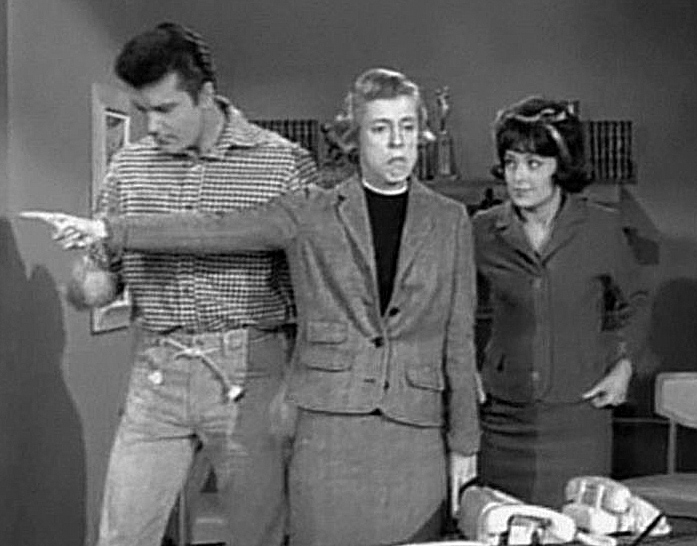
Jane Hathaway (center, portrayed by Nancy Kulp), a character from The Beverly Hillbillies, graduated from Vassar.

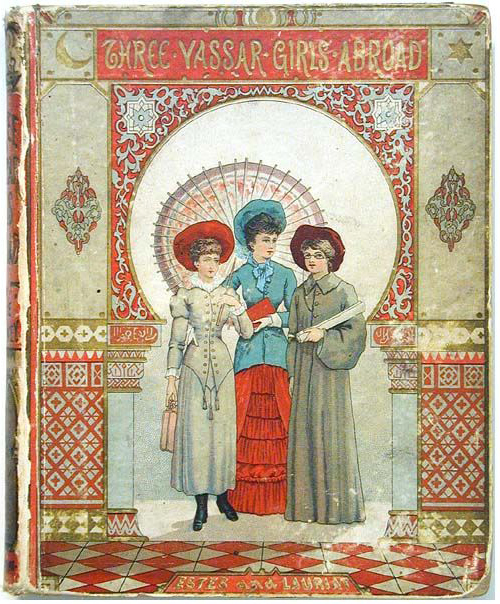
Three Vassar Girls Abroad cover, by Elizabeth Williams Champney

Vassar College has been featured in many books, movies, and television shows. This is a partial list of references and fictional alumni.

- Martin Geldhart, Vassar professor of landscape architecture in The Substance of Fire
- Holly Goodhead, character from Moonraker and its novelization
- Miss Jane Hathaway, a character in The Beverly Hillbillies, graduated from Vassar.
- Erica, the main protagonist of the Academy-Award nominated film An Unmarried Woman (1978), went to Vassar
- Three Vassar Girls Abroad, a book series by Elizabeth Williams Champney about Maud Van Vechten, Barbara Atchison and Cecilia Boylston (current students)
- Katherine "Kitty" Montgomery, character played by Susan Sullivan on Dharma and Greg
- Olive Snook, character played by Kristin Chenoweth on Pushing Daisies; attended on a jockey scholarship
- Georgina Tuskin, character in Susanna Kaysen's memoir Girl, Interrupted
- Lilly Kane from Veronica Mars attended Vassar in a second-season dream sequence; in the actual storyline, she had been murdered three years earlier.
- Two young men in Terrence McNally's Off-Broadway play Some Men portray gender studies majors from Vassar College.
- Heidi Holland, main character of The Heidi Chronicles by Wendy Wasserstein
- In Miss Congeniality, Benjamin Bratt introduces Sandra Bullock to Beth, an undergrad at Vassar, doing a paper on law enforcement.
- Two old ladies in The Dark Tower, the seventh and final book of the series of the same name, by Stephen King
- Principal Willoughby, from the Nickelodeon cartoon Jimmy Neutron: Boy Genius
- Characters from the 1963 novel, The Group, by alumna Mary McCarthy
- Cricket Feldstein, from Hamlet 2, an ACLU attorney who holds a degree in French.
- Betsy Ann Fitzgerald, from The Curse of the Jade Scorpion
- Kathy Lacey, from Gentleman's Agreement, a high-status New Yorker portrayed by Dorothy McGuire.
- Marian Stevens, from Robin and the Seven Hoods, a mob daughter, portrayed by Barbara Rush
- Selena St. George, from Dolores Claiborne, an alcoholic journalist portrayed by Jennifer Jason Leigh
- Elizabeth Vaughan, the central character of the musical If/Then, as well as her friend Lucas
- Catherine Meyer, First Daughter of the United States in the HBO series Veep, majored in film studies at Vassar.
- Hallie Shea, a journalist in the HBO series The Newsroom, graduated from Vassar.
- Winter Anderson, in the series American Horror Story: Cult, dropped out of Vassar to campaign for Hillary Clinton.
- Jared Dunn, from the HBO series Silicon Valley, went to Vassar.
- Dr. Harris Bonkers, Ph.D., a rabbit portrayed in the "Amnesty" arc of the podcast The Adventure Zone, went to Vassar
- Lisa Simpson, in the season 6 episode "The PTA Disbands" of the animated TV series The Simpsons, makes a reference to her possibly attending Vassar in the future: "There's no way I'll get into an Ivy League school now. At this rate, I probably won't even get into Vassar." Homer replies, "I've had just about enough of your Vassar bashing, young lady!"
- Tulip Olsen, in the season 1 episode "The Cat's Car" of the animated TV series Infinity Train is shown to go to Vassar in an alternate future: "The school for smart people too creative for their own good."
