= Vasiliki Skreta =

Greek-American economist

Vasiliki Skreta is a Greek and American economist, the Leroy G. Denman Regents Professor of Economics at University of Texas at Austin, a fellow of the Centre for Economic Policy Research, a researcher at the National Bureau of Economic Research and holds a part-time appointment at University College London. She is a theoretical microeconomist whose research interests include mechanism design and market interventions.

== Education and career ==
Skreta studied economics at the Athens University of Economics and Business, graduating with a bachelor's degree in 1995. She completed a Ph.D. in 2001 at the University of Pittsburgh, supervised by Philip J. Reny.

She became an assistant professor at the University of Minnesota from 2002 to 2004, at the University of California, Los Angeles from 2004 to 2008, and at the New York University Stern School of Business from 2008 to 2013. In 2013, she moved to University College London as a full professor of economics. She has been a professor at University of Texas at Austin since 2017 and was awarded the Leroy G. Denman Regents Professorship in 2021.

== Recognition ==
Skreta was elected as a Fellow of the Society for the Advancement of Economic Theory in 2021, as a Fellow of the European Economic Association in 2022, and as a Fellow of the Econometric Society in 2023.
