= Oliver Samuel Tonks =

American art historian

- Born: December 26, 1874; Malden, Massachusetts, United States
- Died: December 25, 1953 (aged 78); Poughkeepsie, New York, United States
- Occupations: Art historian Educator

Academic background
- Education: Harvard University
- Thesis: Brygos (1903)
- Influences: Allan Marquand

Academic work
- Discipline: Art history
- Sub-discipline: Classical art
- Institutions: Museum of Fine Arts, Boston; University of Vermont; Columbia University; Princeton University; Vassar College
- Influenced: Alfred H. Barr Jr. Henry-Russell Hitchcock; A. Hyatt Mayor

Oliver Samuel Tonks (December 26, 1874 – December 25, 1953) was an American art historian, educator, and curator. Tonks was Professor of Art History Emeritus at Vassar College.

== Career ==
Born in Malden, Tonks was educated at Harvard University, where he earned three degrees: a Bachelor of Arts in 1898, a Master of Arts in 1899, and a Doctor of Philosophy in Classical Archeology in 1903. He was the first to be awarded a doctorate at Harvard in that field, and wrote a dissertation on the Brygos Painter. Additionally, Tonks was a fellow at the American School of Classical Studies at Athens for the 1901 to 1902 academic year. In the following year, he acted as Assistant Curator of Classical Art at the Museum of Fine Arts, Boston.

Upon graduating, Tonks began his career with one year stints teaching Ancient Greek at the University of Vermont and Columbia University. First, he was an instructor, and then was a lecturer. From 1905 to 1911, Tonks was hired by Allan Marquand to teach art history and archeology at Princeton University. In that final year, he was hired as Chair and Professor of Art History at Vassar College until his retirement in 1944. Tonks was then given the title Emeritus, which he held until his death in Poughkeepsie in 1953.

== See also ==
- List of Columbia University people
- List of Harvard University people
- List of Princeton University people
- List of Vassar College people
