= James Wells Champney =

American painter (1843–1903)

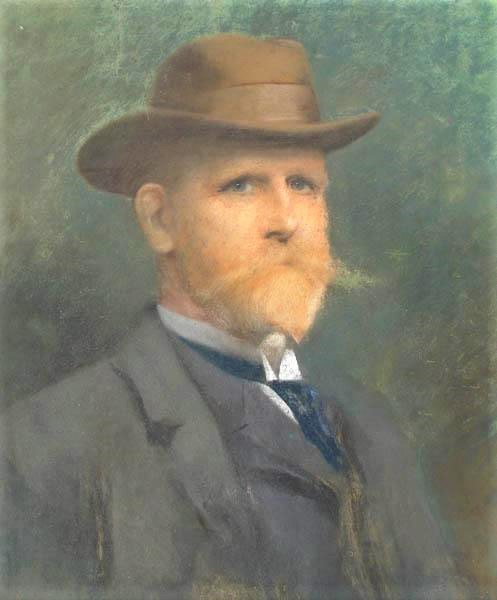
- Self-portrait, date unknown
- Born: 16 July 1843; Boston, Massachusetts
- Died: 1 May 1903 (aged 59); New York
- Education: Royal Academy in Antwerp
- Known for: Portraits, illustrations
- Style: Wood engraving, Painting, Pastels, Illustration

James Wells Champney (July 16, 1843 – May 1, 1903) was an American genre artist and illustrator noted for his portraits, oriental scenes and American landscapes.

== Life and career ==
Champney was born in Boston, the son of Benjamin and Sarah Wells Champney. His mother died when he was quite young and he was raised by relatives. At the age of 16 years he began his career as an apprentice wood engraver and earned a living making wood engravings. At the outbreak of Civil War he left the apprenticeship and enlisted in the 45th Massachusetts Volunteers. He was at Gettysburg and during his service he contracted malaria and was discharged. After the war he taught drawing for a short period and in 1866 he travelled to Europe where he studied under the genre painter, Edouard Frère in Ecouen. He later studied with Van Lerius at the Royal Academy in Antwerp. He returned to America in 1870 and opened an Academy, but was soon drawn back to Europe, settling in Rome for a time and visiting Paris.

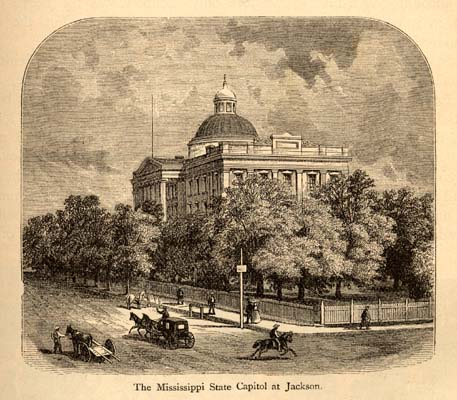
1875 Mississippi Capitol

In 1873 he eloped with Elizabeth Williams, his former student of drawing, to save her from an arranged marriage. For three years following their marriage the couple travelled through Europe and were living in France when their first child was born. The family eventually settled in Deerfield, Massachusetts.

James and Elizabeth became productive collaborators. Elizabeth contributed many articles and illustrations to magazines such as Scribners and Harper's and also authored several series of travel books, often with her husband providing the illustrations. James' etchings and illustrations were very popular and were used to illustrate books not only by his wife, but by other notable authors.

In 1879 the Champneys purchased a second home on New York's fashionable Fifth Avenue, where James established a studio. He also maintained a studio at Deerfield, Massachusetts. Although he spent most of his time working at his New York studio, his favourite place of work was the studio at Deerfield.

In 1880 the couple secured a contract to illustrate a series of articles for Century Magazine. For this endeavour the pair embarked on travel to North Africa, Spain and Portugal, visiting localities such as Tangier and Tétouan in Morocco, that had not been covered by any of the illustrated magazines at that time. In Europe they encountered the works of the Spanish realist, Mariano Fortuny and the French painter, Henri Regnault, and spent much of their time following in the artists' footsteps across Spain, France and Morocco. Between 1880 and 1890, the Champneys made several trips to Europe, and in 1890 Champney opened a studio in Paris.

From around 1885 Champney focussed almost exclusively on pastels. He exhibited pastel works at the Columbian Exhibition in Chicago (1893, 1898). In 1882 he was elected into the National Academy of Design as an Associate member. He was also a member of the Salmagundi Art Club.

The Champney's marriage was a very happy one. In the midst of preparing for a trip to Russia, James died on 1 May 1903 in from a fall in a New York elevator shaft; the circumstances were reported in The New York Times. He was survived by his widow; a son, Édouard Frère Champney (b. 1874, France), an architect, of Washington; and a daughter, Mrs John Humphreys, known as Marie Champney (b. 1877), a painter of miniatures.

== Works ==
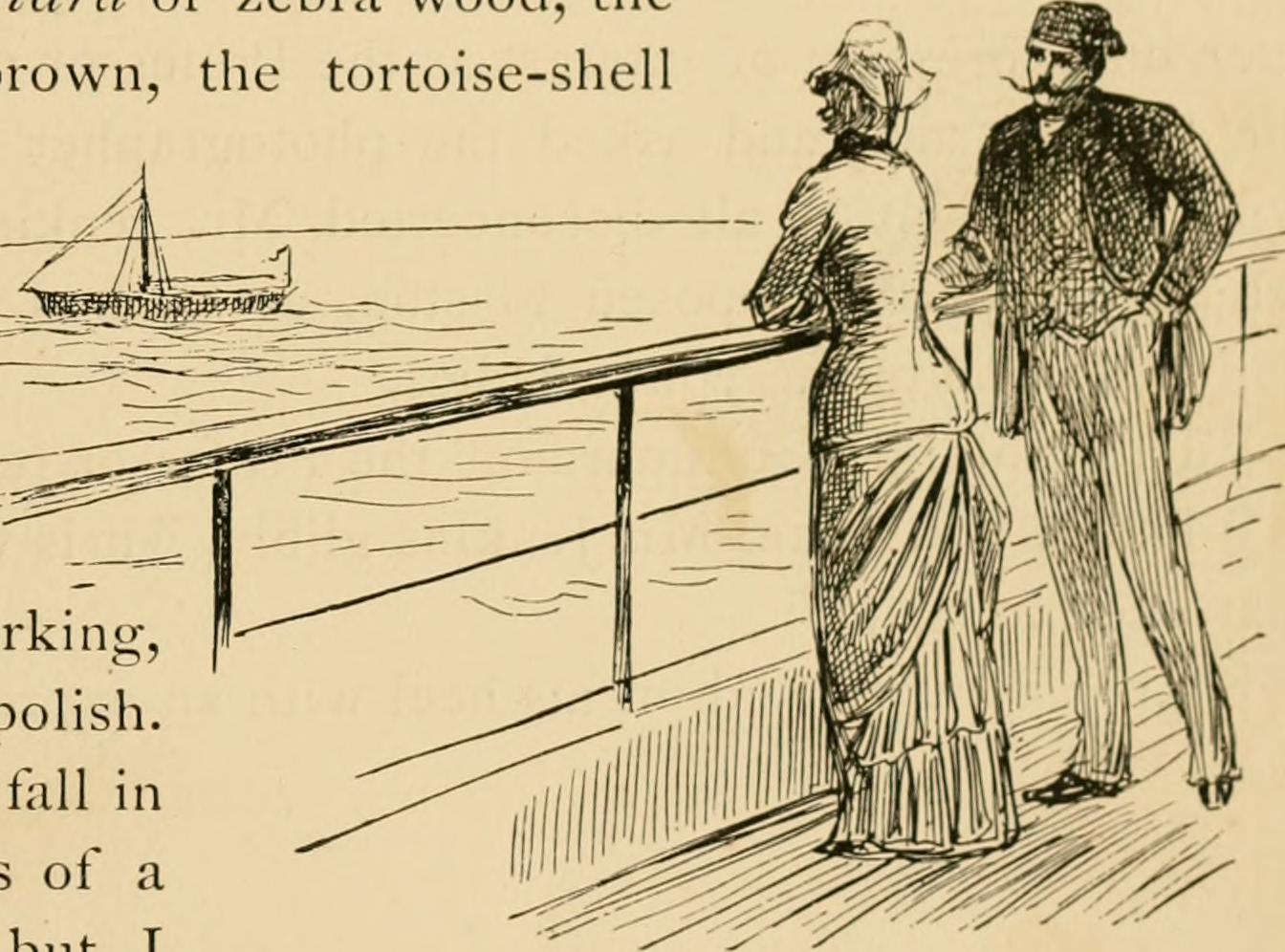
Illustration from Three Vassar Girls in South America, 1885)

Champney's paintings include landscape and genre subjects as well as Orientalist scenes. After his travels in Europe, he concentrated almost exclusively on pastels and became known for his portraits, especially those of young girls. Among the many portraits he painted are those of William Winter, Henry M. Stanley, and Mary Mannering as "Daphne." He also lectured on photography and was an advocate of the photograph's pictorial potential. In addition, he carried out decorations for the Hotel Manhattan in 1898. He often signed his work as "Champs" to distinguish himself from other artists with the same family name.

Paintings and Pastels

- The Lesson, 1874
- The Little Beggar, 1874
- Puss in Boots, 1875
- The Letter, 1881
- The Fan, 1882
- The Coquette, 1885
- Self-portrait in a Turban, 1887
- Garden at Versailles, 1893
- Woman Seated Holding Lilies, 1902
- Bearded Man In A White Turban, n.d.
- Veiled Woman, n.d.

Book Illustrations

- Edward Smith King & James Wells Champney (illustrator), The Great South: A Record of Journeys in Louisiana, Texas, the Indian Territory, Missouri, Arkansas, Mississippi, Alabama, Georgia, Florida, South Carolina, North Carolina, Kentucky, Tennessee, Virginia, West Virginia, and Maryland, American Publishing Company, 1875
- William Henry Thomes & James Wells Champney (illustrator), The Gold Hunters' Adventures; Or, Life in Australia, Chicago, A.T. Lloyd, 1888.
- Elizabeth Williams Champney & James Wells Champney, Three Vassar Girls Abroad, 1883
- Elizabeth Williams Champney & James Wells Champney, Three Vassar Girls in South America, 1885
- Elizabeth Williams Champney & James Wells Champney, Three Vassar Girls in Italy: A Holiday Excursion of Three College Girls Through the Classic Lands, Boston, Estes and Lauriat, 1886
- Elizabeth Williams Champney & James Wells Champney, Three Vassar Girls in Switzerland, 1890
- Elizabeth Williams Champney & James Wells Champney, Three Vassar Girls in the Tyrol, 1891
- Elizabeth Williams Champney & James Wells Champney, Great-grandmother's Girls In New France: The History Of Little Eunice Williams..., Boston, Estes and Lauriat, 1887
- Elizabeth Williams Champney & James Wells Champney, Witch Winnie in Paris: Or the King's Daughters Abroad, 1893

== Gallery ==
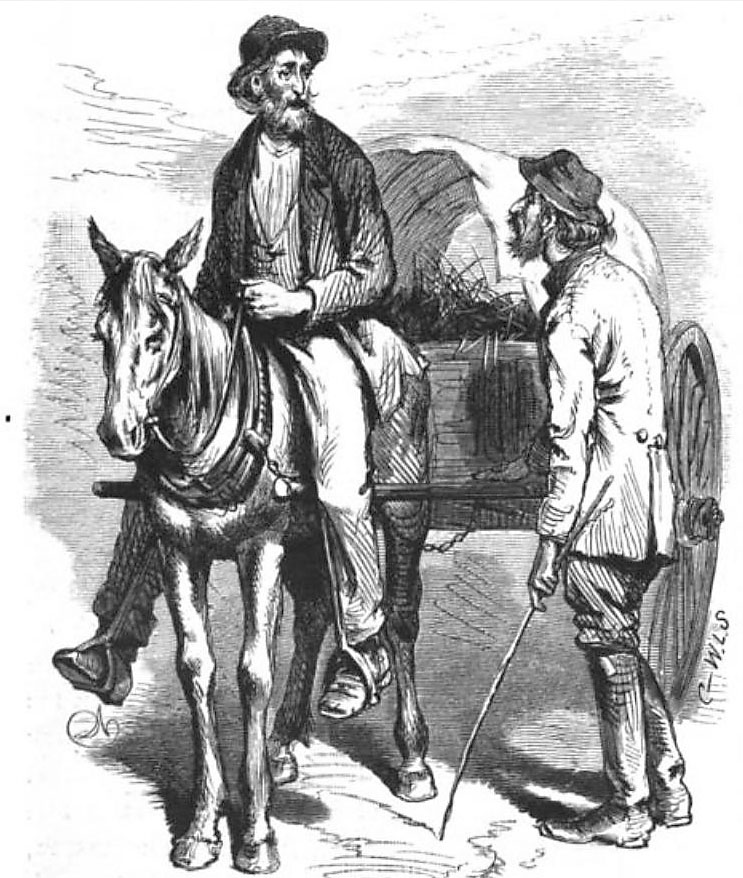
Georgia Crackers, 1873

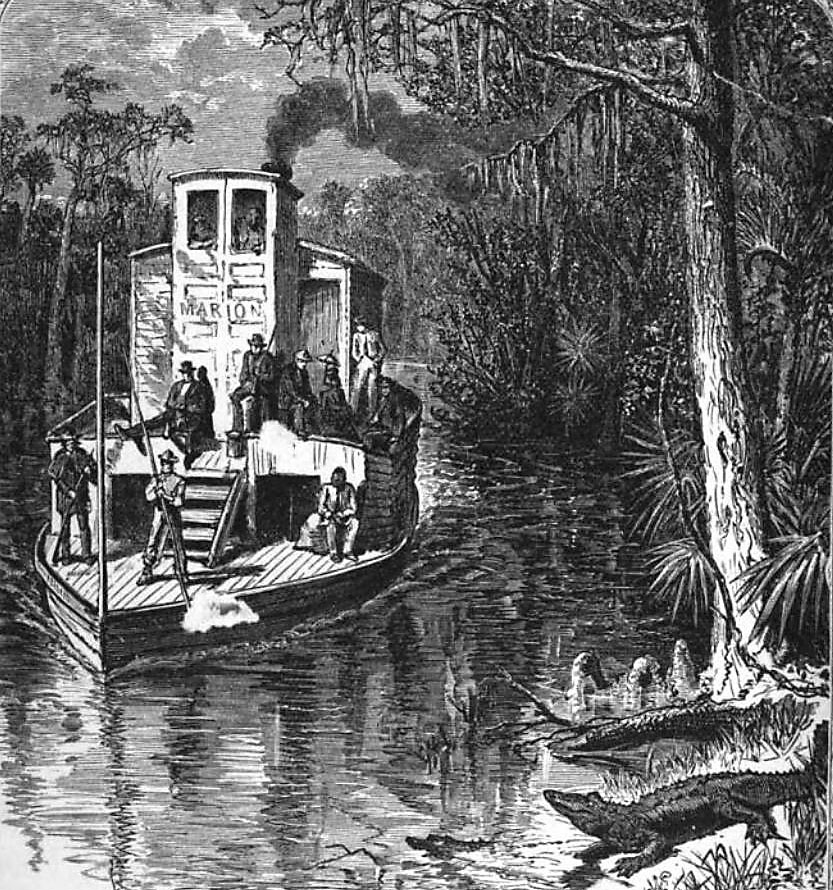
Marion Sternwheeler, Ocklawaha River Florida, 1873

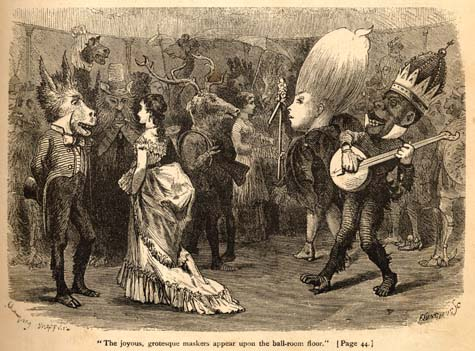
Great South Carnival Maskers, 1875

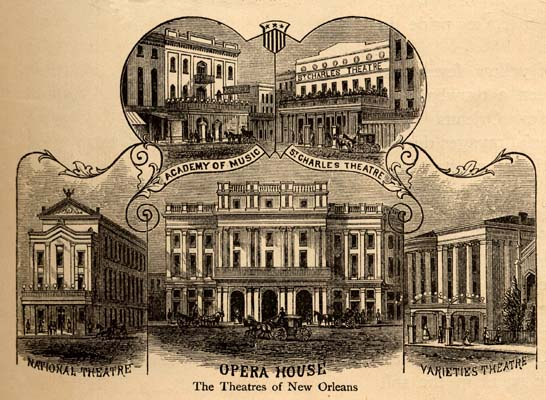
Theatres of New Orleans, 1875
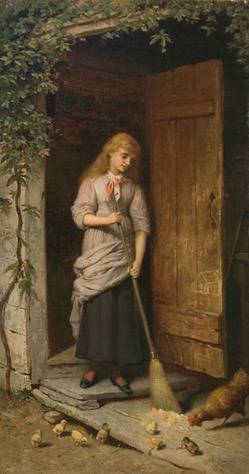
Girl with Broom in Doorway, 1882

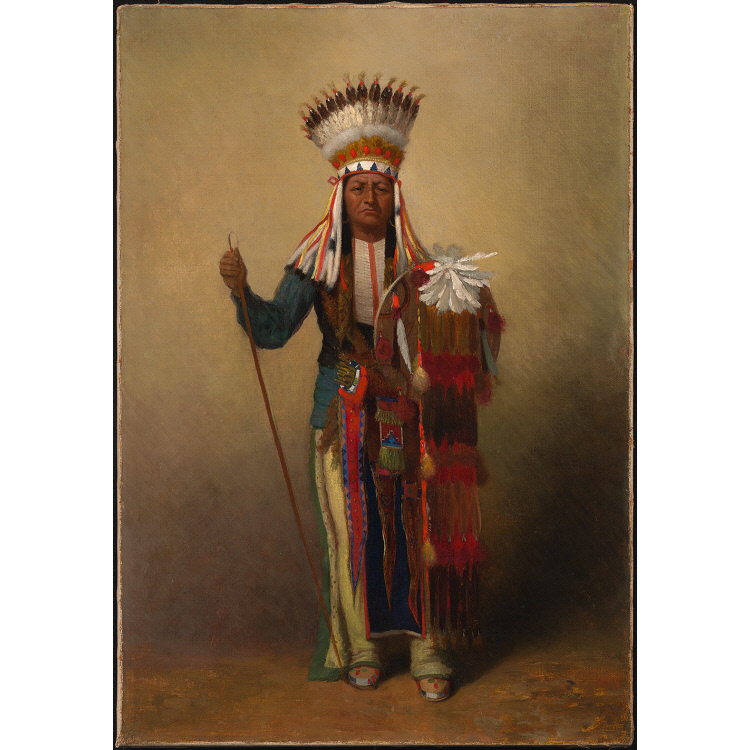
Minimic National Portrait Gallery
