= Philip J. Reny =

American economist

- Born: 1958 (age 67–68); Ottawa, Canada

Academic background
- Education: Princeton University, University of Western Ontario, Carleton University

Academic work
- Discipline: Economics
- Institutions: University of Chicago
- Doctoral students: Vasiliki Skreta
- Website: Information at IDEAS / RePEc

Philip J. Reny is the Hugo F. Sonnenschein Distinguished Service Professor in Economics and in the college at the University of Chicago. Reny is an economic theorist and perhaps is best known for the textbook Advanced microeconomic theory written jointly with Geoffrey A. Jehle. He is a member of The American Academy of Arts and Sciences (since 2015), and was the Head Editor of Journal of Political Economy. In 1996, Reny became a fellow of the Econometric Society. He has also been a charter member of the Game Theory Society since 1999, and a fellow of the Society for the Advancement of Economic Theory starting in 2012.

== Selected publications ==
- Jehle, G. A., & Reny, P. J. (2001). Advanced microeconomic theory. Boston: Addison-Wesley. ISBN 978-0-273-73191-7
- Reny, Philip J. (1992) "Rationality in extensive-form games." The Journal of Economic Perspectives 103–118.
- Reny, Philip J. (1999) "On the existence of pure and mixed strategy Nash equilibria in discontinuous games." Econometrica 67.5 1029–1056.
