= Alexis Landau =

American novelist

Alexis Landau is an American novelist.

== Life ==
She graduated from Vassar College, Emerson College, and the University of Southern California.

Her work has appeared in the Los Angeles Times. and San Francisco Chronicle.

== Works ==
- The Empire of the Senses. New York: Pantheon. 2014. ISBN 978-1-101-87007-5.
- Those Who Are Saved. Penguin. 2021-02-23. ISBN 978-0-593-19053-1.
- The Mother of All Things. New York: Pantheon. 2024-05-07. ISBN 978-0-593-70079-2.
