= Winifred Kirkland =

American writer (1872–1943)

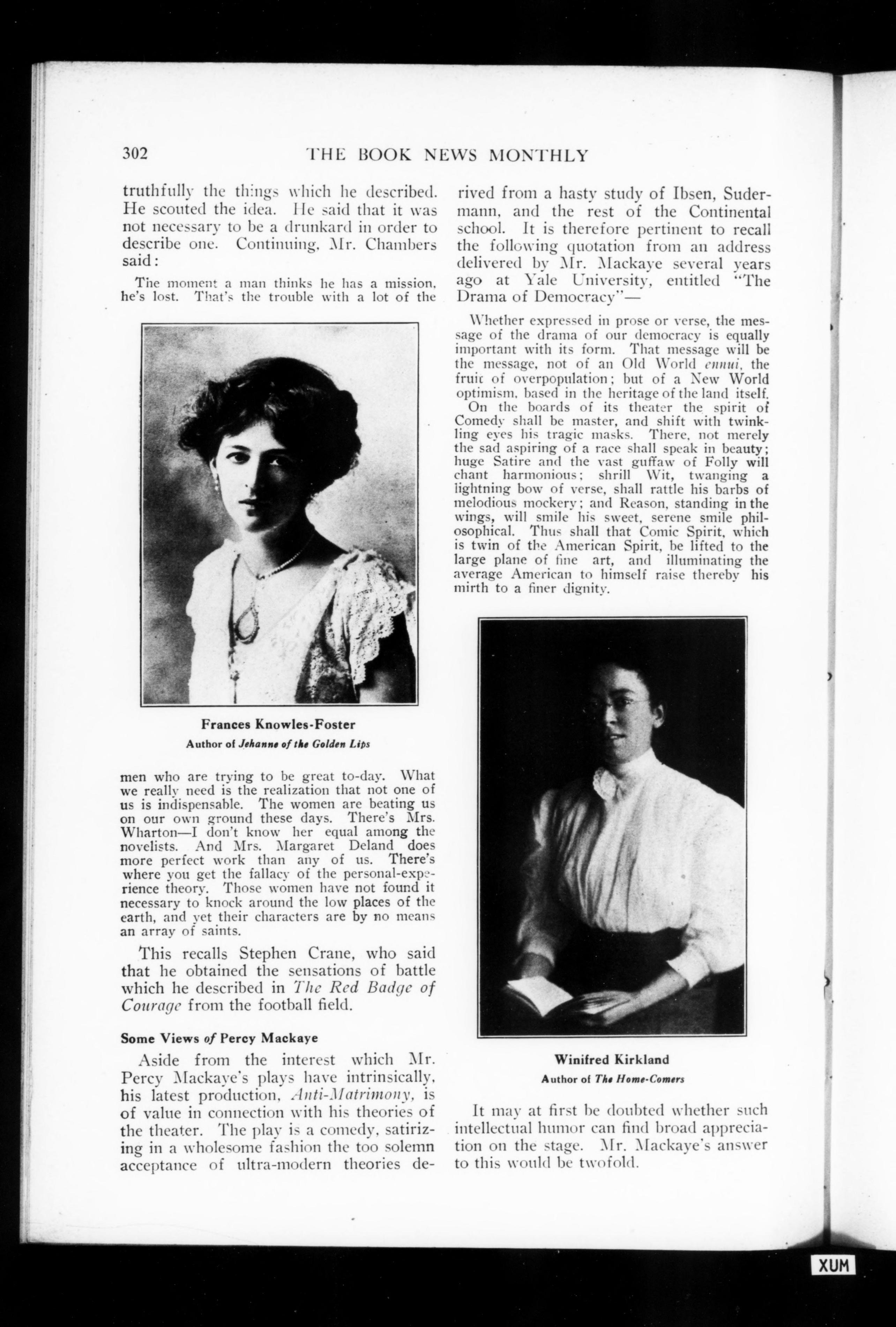
- Winifred Kirkland circa 1911
- Born: November 25, 1872; Columbia
- Died: May 14, 1943 (aged 70); Sewanee
- Pen name: James Priceman
- Alma mater: Vassar College

Winifred Margaretta Kirkland (November 25, 1872 – May 14, 1943) was an American writer. She occasionally used the pseudonym James Priceman. In her early career, Kirkland mainly wrote essays; later, her work focused on Christian religious themes. Her 1918 essay "The New Death", originally published in The Atlantic, posited a shift in American attitudes toward death following World War I.

== Life ==
Winifred Margaretta Kirkland was born on November 25, 1872, in Columbia, Pennsylvania, to Emma Matilda (Reagan) and George Henry Kirkland. She received a bachelor's degree from Vassar College in 1897.

She died on May 14, 1943, in Sewanee, Tennessee.

== Work ==
Kirkland's early work was mainly essays and stories. Later in her writing career, she began to focus on Christian religious themes.

A 1916 essay for The Atlantic, for which Kirkland wrote several essays over the years, speculated that women lacked the artistic originality of men because their minds and bodies were too closely connected: the "personal indistinguishable from the intellectual". This made creation difficult because women's psychology, typically diffuse, needed to be reformulated for each creative effort, whereas male intellect was already well formed. The same year, her essay "The Joys of Being a Woman" defended the status quo of women's political status (at a point when women were not permitted to vote in the United States).

Kirkland's essay "The New Death", originally published in The Atlantic in 1918 and then expanded into a book, identifies a shift in American attitudes towards death after World War I. The theme is that death's ubiquitous presence in wartime made it possible to recast death as a positive thing, merely one necessary step on the way to eternity: "the perception of our mortal end as the mere portal of an eternal progression".

Her essay collection The Views Vertical was first published in 1920. The title refers to humans' upright stature, as opposed to the horizontal views of other animals. It mainly includes humorous essays. She won a literary award called the Patterson Memorial Cup from the North Carolina Literary and Historical Association for the collection. At the time, she lived in Asheville, North Carolina.

== Writing ==
- Polly Pot's Parish (1907)
- Introducing Corinna (1909)
- The Home-Comers (1910)
- Christmas Bishop (1913)
- The Views Vertical (1920)
- Chaos and Greed (as James Priceman) (1925)
- Portrait of a Carpenter (1931)
- As Far as I Can See (1936)
- Star in the East (1938)
- Are We Immortal? (1941)
