= Helen Worthing Webster =

American physician

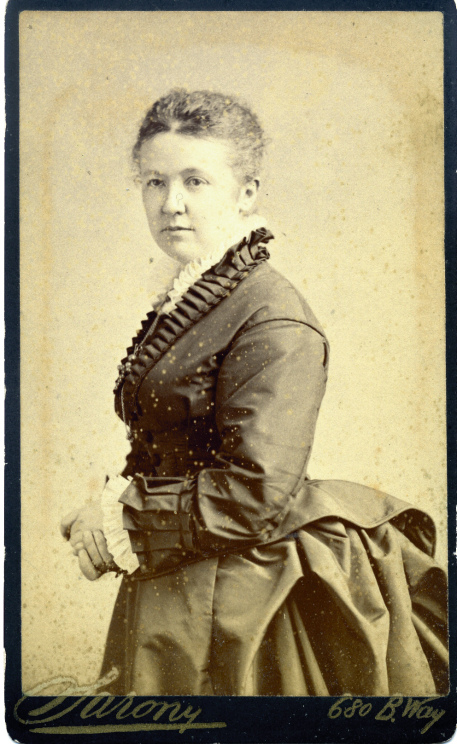
- Born: March 24, 1837; Boston
- Died: July 19, 1904 (aged 67); New Bedford
- Alma mater: New England Female Medical College
- Occupation: Medical doctor
- Employer: Vassar College

Helen Worthing Webster (March 24, 1837 – July 19, 1904) was an American physician and an early supporter of women's baseball.

== Early life and education ==
Helen Worthing Webster was born on March 24, 1837 in Boston, the daughter of Reverend Amos H. Worthing, a soap maker, and Laura Jacobs Worthing. She was raised in New Bedford, Massachusetts. Initially, she worked as a music teacher.

== Career ==
Webster graduated from the New England Female Medical College in 1862 at a time when female physicians were rare in the United States. During the American Civil War, she worked as a physician in Union Army hospitals in Washington, DC. There she met William W. Webster and they married. They would have one daughter, Laura Webster (c. 1864-1943), who became a professional cellist who performed with the Eichberg Quartet.

Following the war, Webster worked at the New England Hospital for Women and Children in Boston, then opened a private medical practice in New Bedford.

In 1874, she replaced Alida Avery as professor of Physiology and Hygiene and Resident Physician at Vassar College. She and another Vassar employee, Lilian Tappan, supported the reappearance of women's baseball at Vassar the next year. One Vassar student recalled that Webster supported the game despite a player sustaining an injury: "Dr. Webster said that the public would doubtless condemn the game as too violent, but that if the student had hurt herself while dancing the public would not condemn dancing to extinction." This anecdote has often been cited, including in Ken Burns' Baseball.

After leaving Vassar in 1881, she returned to private practice in New Bedford.

== Death ==
Helen Worthing Webster died at New Bedford on July 19, 1904.
