= Harriet Guild =

American physician (1899–1992)

Harriet Griggs Guild
- Born: 1899; Windham, Connecticut, U.S.
- Died: 1992 (aged 92); Anne Arundel County, Maryland
- Education: Vassar College (A.B.); Johns Hopkins School of Medicine (MD)
- Occupations: Pediatrician, professor, medical researcher
- Employer: Johns Hopkins School of Medicine

Harriet Griggs Guild (1899–1992) was an American physician with a specialization in pediatric kidney disease. She is credited with saving the lives of countless children through her research and practice as well as establishing foundations to raise funds for continued research and patient support.

== Early life and education ==
Born in Windham, Connecticut, to parents Dr. Frank E. Guild and Harriet Clark, she and her brother and sister grew up watching their father serve their community as a country doctor. As a child, Guild wished she were a boy so that she could attend medical school. Instead, she chose to study language at Vassar College with the intention to teach. However, she fell in love with medicine after taking a biology course and switched career paths. After graduating in 1920, Guild took summer courses to earn enough credits in chemistry for medical school. She was one of 10 women out of 78 students in her graduating class at Johns Hopkins School of Medicine. After earning her M.D. in 1925, she completed a one-year internship in medicine at The Johns Hopkins Hospital. Dr. Guild then began her pediatric internship and residency in pediatrics.

== Career ==
In 1928, she was appointed as director of the Harriet Lane Dispensary while also teaching in the role of pediatrics instructor. Two years later, in 1930, she formed the pediatric diabetic clinic. In 1934, she was elevated to assistant professor and taught students in their third and fourth years of medical school until 1946. With her focus in pediatric kidney research and treatment established, Dr. Guild founded the Maryland Nephrosis Association in 1955; it was later renamed the Kidney Foundation of Maryland. In addition to efforts via this foundation, Dr. Guild started the "Wishing Well" summer getaway event for pediatric renal patients and their families.

After nearly four decades at Johns Hopkins School of Medicine, Dr. Guild retired, was named professor emeritus, and opened a private pediatric practice. She would continue to treat patients for another two decades until a knee surgery finally forced her into full retirement.

Dr. Guild was living with a nephew in Anne Arundel County, Maryland, when she died in May 1992. She was 92 years old. Memorial services were held in her honor in her hometown of Windham, Connecticut, and Baltimore, Maryland.

== Awards ==
- Baltimore City's Women Hall of Fame, 1985
- Elizabeth Blackwell Award by the New York Infirmary to outstanding women doctors, 1958
- Armed Forces Institute of Pathology medal for contributions to medicine, 1965
