= Richard Möller =

American soccer player (born 1977)

Personal information
- Date of birth: January 24, 1977 (age 49)
- Place of birth: Ludwigshafen, West Germany
- Height: 5 ft 9 in (1.75 m)
- Position: Forward

Youth career
- 1. FC Kaiserslautern

College career
Years	Team	Apps	(Gls)
1995–1998	Towson Tigers		

Senior career*
Years	Team	Apps	(Gls)
1999	Maryland Mania	1	(0)
2000–2001	Baltimore Blast (indoor)	403	(304)

Managerial career
- 1999–2001: Villa Julie Mustangs (assistant)
- 2002: Smith Pioneers (assistant)
- 2003–2004: Western Illinois Leathernecks
- 2005: Dartmouth Big Green (assistant)
- 2006–2011: Vassar Brewers (women)
- 2012–2014: St. Mary's Seahawks (women)
- 2015–2016: Johns Hopkins Blue Jays (women asst.)
- * Club domestic league appearances and goals

Richard Möller (born January 24, 1977) is an American soccer retired forward and coach. He played one season each in the USISL and the National Professional Soccer League.

== Playing career ==
=== Youth ===
Möller was born in Ludwigshafen, West Germany. Prior to coming to the US, he played for 1. FC Kaiserslautern (winning the German National Championship), played for the Kreisauswahl, played for the Südwestauswahl (equivalent to the US Regional Team) and for the German Youth National Teams. He also earned his Abitur from Albert-Einstein Gymnasium (Germany has four levels of high school degrees and the Abitur is the highest one; less than 5% of the German society attends a Gymnasium). Möller attended Towson University, playing on the men's soccer team from 1995 to 1998. He holds the school's and the America East's single season records for goals. Möller was a 1998 All American (first in the soccer program's history) and Scholar-Athlete All American (first in the soccer program's history). He was also named the America East Rookie of the Year (his freshman year) and America East Player of the Year his senior year (first in the program to earn those honors). Riche Möller is also the first for the program and conference to earn America-East Scholar Athlete of the Year awards back-to-back. He also became the first from the state of Maryland to win the prestigious ECAC Scholar-Athlete of the Year award. He won close to 50 athletic and academic awards during his time at Towson. He graduated with Latin honors in 1999 with a bachelor's degree in modern languages . Following his graduation in 1998, he entered the University of Maryland, College Park where he started a PhD program in German literature, but decided to change his career path attending Smith College, to earn his graduate degree in Exercise Science.

=== Professional ===
In 1999, the Maryland Mania of the USL A-League, associated with D.C. United, selected Möller in the Territorial Round of the USL Draft. In October 2000, he signed with the Baltimore Blast of the National Professional Soccer League (NPSL) after being drafted second overall. Möller decided to retire from professional soccer after two years to continue his education at Smith College and to pursue a collegiate coaching career shortly after graduation.

== Coaching career ==
In 1999, Möller became the assistant coach at NCAA Division III Villa Julie College. He assisted the women's soccer program's and the athletics department's first trip to the NCAA Tournament, advancing to the Sweet Sixteen National Championship. In 2002, he attended Smith College as a graduate assistant (assisting the program to its first double-digit winning season in over a decade). After Smith, he became the head coach at the NCAA Division I Western Illinois. He led the team to a top-4 seed after being picked last in the preseason poll. Both his recruiting classes were ranked first within the conference and ranked top 20 nationally. In 2005, he became the top assistant coach at Dartmouth College. His recruiting class was nationally ranked and assisted the program to the NCAA Tournament. In March 2006, Möller became the head coach at Vassar College. At Vassar, he became the first coach to lead the program to four consecutive winning seasons. Prior to his arrival, Vassar's winning percentage in the Liberty League was under 15% and after completing one recruiting cycle, the program's winning percentage within the conference was over 80%. He is the first coach to lead the program to postseason play, tying the Number 1 team in the nation in the conference finals. The program received its first regional and national ranking under Möller. The program remained regionally ranked for three consecutive years (another program first). Möller has also been an Assistant Girls Coach for the German Youth National Teams for over six years.

Möller is the Associate Head Women's Soccer Coach at Johns Hopkins University since January 2015. During his two years the program won the Conference Championship back-to-back advancing to the NCAA Tournament (2016: hosting the first two rounds, winning both rounds and advancing to the Sweet Sixteen National Championship match).
