= Marian Thurm =

American novelist

Marian Thurm (born in 1952) is an American novelist and short-story writer. Thurm is the author of five short story collections and eight novels including The Blackmailer’s Guide to Love (Delphinium Books, 2021) and, most recently, I Don't Know How to Tell You This (Delphinium Books, 2025). Her short stories have appeared in The New Yorker, The Atlantic, Michigan Quarterly Review, Narrative Magazine, The Southampton Review, and many other magazines, and have been included in The Best American Short Stories, and numerous other anthologies. Thurm was raised in Oceanside, Long Island, and has resided in New York City for over 30 years. She is a graduate of Vassar College and has a Master of Arts in creative writing from Brown University.

Marian Thurm has taught creative writing at Yale University, Barnard College, Columbia University, the Writing Institute at Sarah Lawrence College, and in the MFA programs at Columbia University and Brooklyn College.

== Works ==
=== Books ===
- I Don't Know How to Tell You This (novel) 2025.
- The Blackmailer’s Guide to Love (novel) 2021
- Pleasure Palace; New and Selected Stories (short stories) 2021
- The Good Life (novel) 2016
- Today is Not Your Day (short stories) 2015 (New York Times Book Review Editors’ Choice)
- Slicker (pseudonymous novel by Lucy Jackson) 2010
- Posh (pseudonymous novel by Lucy Jackson) 2007
- What’s Come Over You? (short stories) 2001
- The Clairvoyant (novel) 1997 (New York Times Book Review Notable Book of the Year)
- The Way We Live Now (novel) 1991
- Henry in Love (novel) 1990
- These Things Happen (short stories) 1988 (New York Times Book Review New and Noteworthy)
- Walking Distance (novel) 1987 (New York Times Book Review New and Noteworthy)
- Floating (short stories) 1984

=== Short stories ===
- "Secrets" — The New Yorker January 16, 1978
- "Winter" — The New Yorker January 1, 1979
- "Markings" — The Atlantic Monthly December 1979
- "California" — Redbook November 1980
- "Aftermath" — Mississippi Review Spring/Summer 1981
- "Skaters" — The New Yorker February 8, 1982
- "Starlight" — The New Yorker May 10, 1982
- "Floating" — The New Yorker July 26, 1982
- "Uncle Dad" — Redbook January 1983
- "Still-Life" — The New Yorker May 23, 1983
- "Grace" — Fiction Network Magazine Fall 1983
- "Leaving Johanna" — Mademoiselle October 1983
- "Lovers" — The New Yorker October 3, 1983
- "Light-years" — The Boston Review January/February 1984
- "The North Pole" — Mademoiselle December 1984
- "Flying" — Mississippi Review No. 42 1985(Distinguished Short Story of the Year, Best American Short Stories 1987)
- "Ice" — Ms. Magazine February 1985 (Reprinted in Editors' Choice—The Best Short Fiction for 1986)
- "Perfect Vision" — Ms. Magazine March 1986
- "Miss Grace At Her Best" — Mademoiselle March 1992
- "Moonlight" — The American Voice No. 42 1997
- "Marquise" — Ontario Review No. 50 Spring/Summer 1999
- "Housecleaning" — Michigan Quarterly Review Fall 2000
- "What Went On" — Greensboro Review Fall 2002
- "Sorry" — Seventeen October 2003
- "Kosta" — The Southampton Review Summer 2013
- "Out to Lunch" — Narrative Magazine Winter 2019
- "End of Story" — Narrative Magazine Winter 2020
- "Banished" — Ascent May 2021
- "These Things Happen" - Saturday Evening Post July/August 2024
