= Melissa Walker =

American novelist

- Born: Melissa Carol Walker; June 4, 1977 (age 49); London, England
- Education: Chapel Hill High School; Vassar College
- Occupations: Author; freelance writer
- Children: 2
- Parent(s): John A. Walker Jr. Nancy Day Walker

Melissa Walker (born June 4, 1977) is an American author, working primarily in the young adult (teen) genre. She is also a freelance writer and has held several editorial positions at American magazines.

== Early and personal life ==
Melissa Carol Walker was born in London and raised in Chapel Hill, North Carolina. She is the daughter of Nancy Day Walker of Chapel Hill, N.C., a retired biology teacher, and the late Capt. John A. Walker Jr., a retired naval officer. Because her father was stationed at the U.S. embassy in London when she was born, she has dual U.S.-British citizenship. Walker’s father has three children from a previous marriage: Johnny, Tim, and Kristi.

She attended Chapel Hill High School and Vassar College. At Vassar, she was an English major and prolific writer for the school newspaper The Miscellany News, serving as features editor and editor in chief during her senior year.

Walker lived in London for a year after college.

== Career ==
Walker interned at McCall's in the summer between her junior and senior years of college. Upon her return to New York from London, she was an assistant editor at Rosie (formerly McCall’s) until it ceased publication in 2002. She was subsequently features editor at ELLEgirl and prom editor at Seventeen. She has written for numerous magazines, including Glamour, SELF, More, Teen Vogue, CosmoGirl, Ladies’ Home Journal, Family Circle, Fitness, and New York.

Violet on the Runway, Walker’s first novel, was published in 2007. Both sequels, Violet by Design and Violet in Private, were published in 2008. The trilogy revolving around Violet Greenfield received critical accolades for its "realistic portrait of the fashion industry." She received praise in the young adult realm for weaving themes of body image and self-esteem into a coming-of-age tale.

Following the "Violet on the Runway" Series, Walker published Lovestruck Summer in May 2009, which was followed Small Town Sinners in 2011, and Unbreak My Heart in 2012. In 2013, HarperCollins published Walker's Ashes to Ashes, followed by Dust to Dust in 2015. Her latest novels are both Middle Grades, Let's Pretend We Never Met and Why Can't I Be You.

== Personal life ==
Walker currently lives in Brooklyn, New York, with her husband. Together they have two daughters.
