= Kate Moorehead =

American priest

The Very Reverend Katherine (Kate) Bingham Moorehead Carroll
- Dean
- Church: The Episcopal Church
- Province: Province 4
- Metropolis: Jacksonville, Florida
- Diocese: Episcopal Diocese of Florida
- Installed: January 10, 2010
- Predecessor: Edward Harrison 2001-2008

Orders
- Consecration: November 1, 2009

Personal details
- Born: September 12, 1970 (age 56) New Haven, Connecticut
- Education: Vassar College, Virginia Theological Seminary

Katherine Bingham "Kate" Moorehead Carroll (born 1970) is an American priest of the Episcopal Church and the tenth dean of St. John's Cathedral, Jacksonville, and the Diocese of Florida. Moorehead was installed as the dean on January 10, 2010.

== Life and career ==
Moorehead was born in New Haven, Connecticut. She is the great-granddaughter of Hiram Bingham III, U.S. Senator from Connecticut and explorer best known for uncovering Machu Picchu. Moorehead graduated Phi Beta Kappa from Vassar College, receiving The Sara Caitlin Award for Religious Leadership and graduated cum laude with a Master of Divinity degree from Virginia Theological Seminary, receiving the Harris Award for Academic Excellence and Leadership Ability.

Moorehead served as rector at St. Margaret’s Episcopal Church in Boiling Springs, South Carolina from 1998 to 2003 and St. James Episcopal Church in Wichita, Kansas from 2003 to 2009.

== Writings ==
- Vital Signs of Faith: Finding Health in Your Spiritual Life. (2022) Ohio: Forward Movement.
- Healed: How Mary Magdalene Was Made Well. (2018) New York: Church Publishing.
- Get Over Yourselves! God’s Here!. (2009) Kansas: St. Marks Press.
- Organic God: Lenten Meditations on the Words of Jesus. (2006) Maryland: Rowman & Littlefield Publishing Group.
- Between Two Worlds: Daily Readings for Advent. (2004) Maryland: Rowman & Littlefield Publishing Group.
