= Valerie Rusch =

American Thoracic Surgeon

Valerie W. Rusch
- Born: New York City, New York, US

Academic background
- Education: AB, Vassar College; MD, Columbia University College of Physicians and Surgeons

Academic work
- Institutions: University of Washington; Memorial Sloan Kettering Cancer Center

Valerie W Rusch is an American thoracic surgeon who is currently the Miner Family Chair for Intrathoracic Cancers and Vice Chair for Clinical Research, Department of Surgery, at Memorial Sloan Kettering Cancer Center.

== Early life and education ==
Originally from New York, NY, Rusch graduated from Lycée Français de New York and then attended Vassar College, graduating in 1971. She earned her MD at Columbia University College of Physicians and Surgeons. She completed her surgical residency training in general surgery and thoracic surgery at the University of Washington from 1975 to 1982 and a fellowship at the University of Texas MD Anderson Cancer Center, Houston.

== Academic career and accomplishments ==
After completing her training, she joined the faculty at University of Washington School of Medicine, serving as an Assistant Professor and then Associate Professor in the Division of Cardiothoracic Surgery. In 1989, she was recruited to Memorial Sloan Kettering Cancer Center by Nael Martini, the Chief of the Thoracic Service in the Department of Surgery.

In 2004, she was a part of a team that identified EGFR mutations in patients with non-small cell lung cancer that responded to EGFR tyrosine kinase inhibitors (such as gefitinib and erlotinib)

In 2015, the Meso Foundation honored Rusch with the Pioneer Award for clinical research in malignant mesothelioma. Rusch was given the 2019 Earl Bakken Scientific Achievement award by the Society for Thoracic Surgeons. This award was established in 1999 to honor individuals who have made outstanding scientific contributions that have enhanced the practice of cardiothoracic surgery and patients' quality of life. She was elected President of the American College of Surgeons from 2019 to 2020. She been Chair of the Thoracic Committee for the American Joint Committee on Cancer 6th, 7th, and 8th editions of the Cancer Staging Handbook.

Rusch has been an advocate for pre-operative therapy for patients with non-small cell lung cancer and is a recognized expert in management of Pancoast tumors. Her work established the standard of care for management of Pancoast tumors. More recently, she has been on the forefront of work incorporating immunotherapy into pre-operative treatment for early stage non-small cell lung cancer.
