= Michael Scharf (poet) =

American poet and critic (born 1969)

- Born: Michael Nathan Scharf; January 6, 1969 (age 57); Albany, New York, U.S.
- Education: Vassar College (AB); Brown University (MA)
- Occupations: Poet, critic

Michael Nathan Scharf (born January 6, 1969, in Albany, New York) is an American poet and critic. Scharf's poetry "mimics a vernacular language so debased it does actual harm." He was poetry reviews editor at Publishers Weekly from 1997 until 2006. At Poets & Writers magazine, he founded and wrote the column Metromania. In 1999, he founded Harry Tankoos Books, which publishes books and chapbooks; in 2006, with the poet Joshua Clover, he co-founded the small press ingirumimusnocteetconsumimurigni, publisher of Kevin Killian's Action Kylie, among other books. He holds an A.B. in cognitive science from Vassar College, and a M.A. in linguistics from Brown University. His work has appeared in Chain, ubuweb, Jacket, the Germ, and the Poetry Daily Essentials anthology.

== Works ==
- Telemachiad (sugarhigh!, 1999), 64pp.
- Vérité (/ubu, 2002), 58pp.
- For Kid Rock / Total Freedom (Spectacular, 2007), 96pp
- Autoportraits from an Earlier Era (SA editions, 2009), 13pp.

== Essays & Articles ==
- Scharf on the use of poetry criticism in Jacket Magazine, 2000
- Scharf on Austrian writers’ protests in Poets & Writers,
- Scharf on Meghalaya, India in Change Observer

== Reviews of Scharf's Work ==
- For Kid Rock / Total Freedom, Stop Smiling, 2007.
- Vérité, Overlap, 2003
- Vérité, Pantaloons, 2004
- Telemachiad, A Tonalist Notes, 2006
