= Sydnor Harbison Walker =

1891-1966, American economist and educator

- Born: September 25, 1891; Louisville, Kentucky
- Died: December 12, 1966 (aged 75); Millbrook, New York
- Education: Vassar College, University of Southern California, Columbia University
- Occupations: Economist, educator

Sydnor Harbison Walker (1891–1966) was an American economist and educator. She is known for her work at the Laura Spelman Rockefeller Memorial Foundation and then the Rockefeller Foundation.

== Biography ==
Walker was born on September 26, 1891, in Louisville, Kentucky. She earned her A.B. in 1913 from Vassar College, her M.A. in 1917 from the University of Southern California and her Ph.D. from Columbia University in 1926.

She began her career working as an instructor at Vassar. She then worked as an industrial relations consultant for the Scott Company and then for the Strawbridge & Clothier. In 1921 through 1923 was an overseas relief worker for the American Friends Service Committee.

In 1924 Walker started her work at the Laura Spelman Rockefeller Memorial Foundation (LSRM) as a research assistant. (LSRM) became part of the Rockefeller Foundation in 1929. There Walker was first the assistant director for their Division of the Social Sciences. She was promoted to associate director then acting director in 1937. She worked at the Rockefeller Foundation until 1943.

From 1939 through 1942 Walker was a trustee of Vassar. In 1941 she contracted a spinal infection which caused paralysis, and thereafter she was confined to using a wheelchair.

In 1948 Walker returned to Vassar where she served as assistant to the college's president Sarah Gibson Blanding. She retired in 1957.

Walker died on December 12, 1966, in Millbrook, New York.

== Publications ==
Social work and the training of social workers, University of North Carolina Press, 1928 ISBN 978-1-4696-0946-1
