= Jehle =

Automobile manufacturer based in Liechtenstein

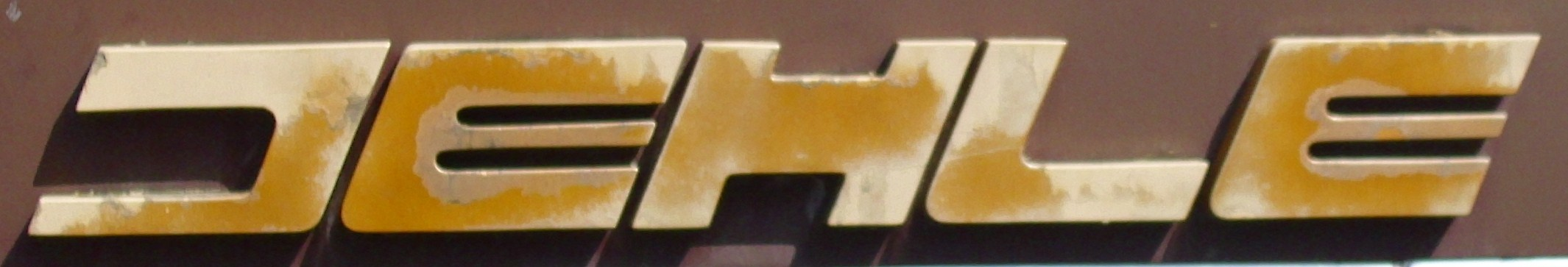
Corporate logo

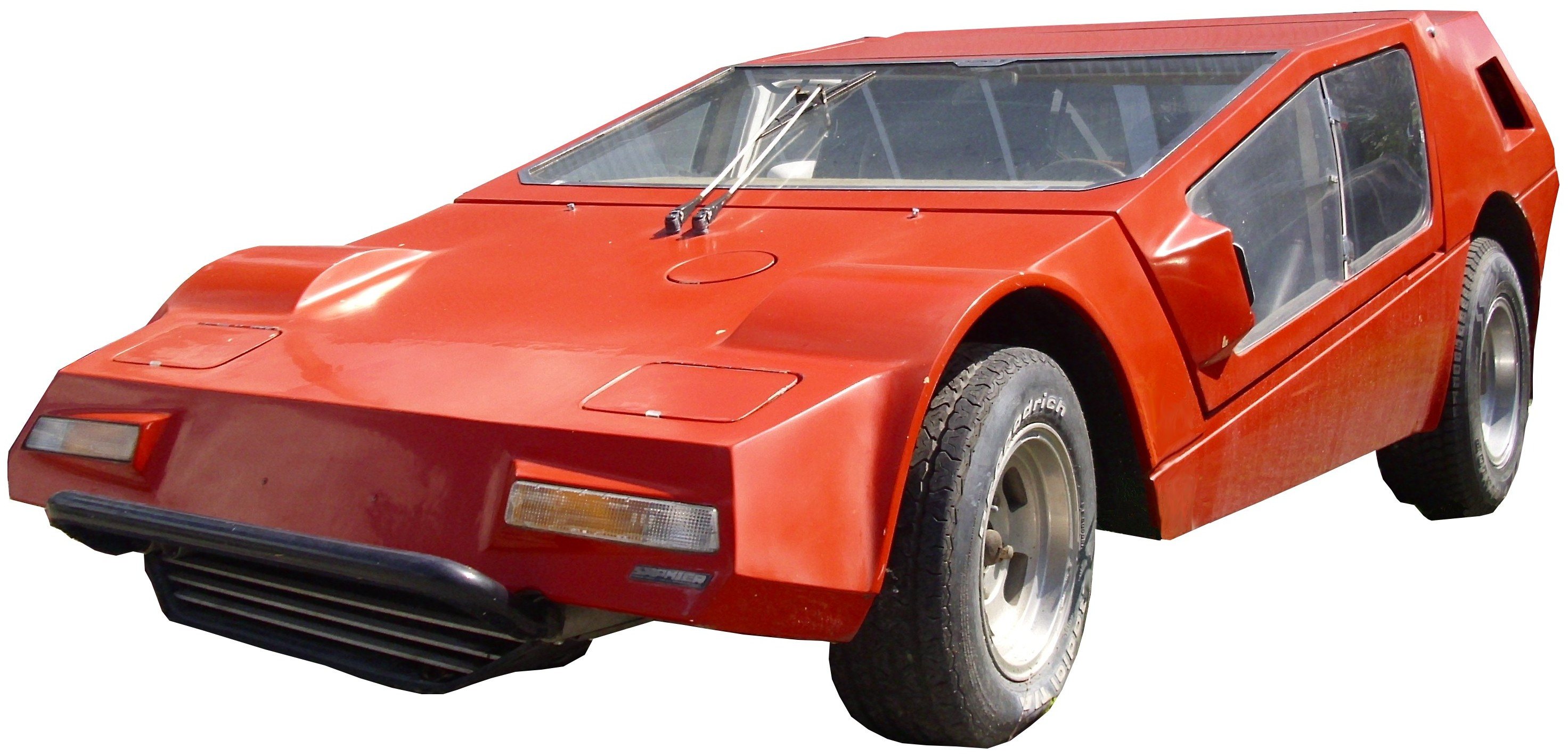
Jehle Saphier

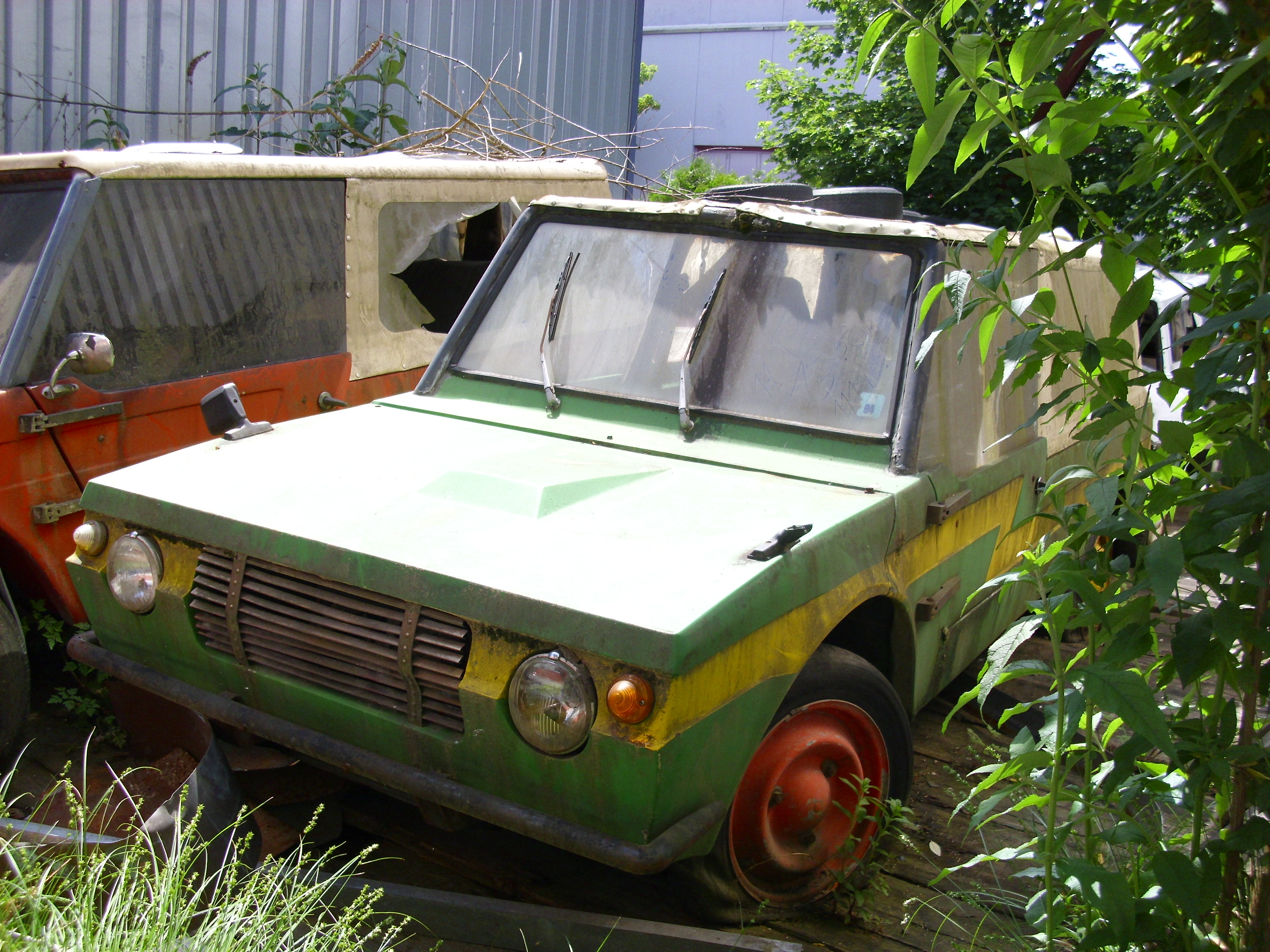
Jehle Safari

Jehle was an automotive company based in Schaan, Liechtenstein, that operated from the late 1970s to the early 1990s. Founded by Xavier Jehle, it was only one of two automotive companies ever to be based in Liechtenstein; the other was Orca Engineering.

== History ==
Jehle started with two variations on the buggy concept: the Mathies-Buggy and the Jehle Safari. The Mathies-Buggy was not driven by the typical Volkswagen Beetle engine, but rather the flat Volkswagen Bus 1600 cc engine, while the Safari was a Citroën-Boxer-based fun car similar to the Citroën Méhari, Both were sold as kits. One model, the Saphier, was a wedge-shaped coupé, whose upper body section opened completely for access to the cockpit; it was offered in a variety of configurations. The basic model was built on a VW Beetle floor plan with a turbocharged Volkswagen Golf engine, while at the upper end of the lineup was a mid-engine model with monocoque construction, and a tuned 5-liter Ford V8. There were also heavily tuned conversions of the Italian De Tomaso Pantera with a Catalytic converter, double turbocharger, and five valves per cylinder, producing up to 600 hp (450 kW). The company also built a prototype V12 coupe reminiscent of the Lamborghini Countach named the Artemis, but with insufficient funds to finish the prototype Jehle folded.
