= Angelica Gibbs =

American writer

Angelica Gibbs (1908 – 10 January 1955) was an American writer of short stories and contributions to magazines like The New Yorker. She was born in Baltimore, Maryland.

== Personal life ==
Angelica Singleton Gibbs was born to Lucius Tuckerman Gibbs and Angelica Singleton Duer. Her older brother, Oliver Wolcott Gibbs, was an editor and theatre critic of The New Yorker. On her mother's side, she was the great-great-granddaughter of the eighth President of the United States, Martin Van Buren, and the First Lady Hannah Hoes Van Buren. She was married to Robert Elliot Canfield and had two children, Sarah Duer Canfield and David E. Canfield.

Gibbs graduated from Vassar College in Poughkeepsie, New York.

== Published works ==
As a senior at Vassar College, Gibbs was the editor of Vassar Poetry, 1930, along with three other seniors who made selections from poems submitted by Vassar students.

In 1932, Gibbs went on to publish her first novel, Murder Between Drinks, a mystery fiction. Gibbs published again in 1944, along with five other writers, in New York Murders. According to a review that appeared in The New Yorker on November 4, 1944:

"Six writers - Kurt Steel, Inspector Thomas Byrnes, Lawrence Treat, Baynard Kendrick, Angelica Gibbs, and Edward D. Radin - tell, for the most part not too successfully, the stories of seven unhackneyed New York State crimes. Mr. Steel's narration of the Walton-Matthews case in 1860, the Byrnes notes on the Ryan murders in 1873, and Miss Gibb's reconstruction of the Wilkins affair in 1919 are fine stuff for the fanciers of the Edmund Pearson school of necrology. The rest of the pieces seem tricked or prettied up for the detective-magazine trade."

== "The Test" ==
Her short story "The Test" was first published in The New Yorker, issue dated June 15, 1940. The story revolves around the main character Marian, a young African-American woman on her second attempt to obtain a driver's license. The story begins with Marian and her employer, Mrs Ericson, driving to the test. Although she has a college degree, Marian could only secure a job working as a nanny to a white family. Marian has already failed her first attempt to get a driver's license due to the racially charged unfairness of the first inspector. On her second try, she again is subjected to a discouraging attitude of an ignorant inspector, leading her to shout out, "Damn you!" before immediately being failed despite her actual driving ability.

The story concerns questions of racial and sexual discrimination and is Gibbs' most often anthologized story, especially amongst other stories that share in themes of discrimination, as in Primer for White Folks where it appears alongside stories by W. E. B. Du Bois, Langston Hughes, Richard Wright and many others.

== The New Yorker ==
Gibbs began submitting fiction to The New Yorker in 1931 and for the next twenty-three years she continued supplying the magazine with fiction as well as contributions to its weekly sections, like Onward & Upward, The Talk of the Town, Comment and reviews for books as well as theater shows. Her more notable contributions to the magazine are:

Fiction

- "To Live Dangerously" (April 11, 1931)
- "Her Mother was a Singleton" (August 29, 1931)
- "The H.J. Winninger Girl "(May 20, 1933)
- "Nonconformist" (June 17, 1933)
- On Wings of Peace (December 18, 1937)
- Who Am I, Jessie (October 15, 1938)
- Lunch Hour (October 22, 1938)
- Helping Hand (January 14, 1939)
- To Meet Edwina (February 11, 1939)
- Dear Little Margaret (March 4, 1939)
- They Have to Be Careful (August 19. 1939)
- The Bootleg Baby Carriage (January 20, 1940)
- Punch with Care (February 17, 1940)
- Marella (July 20, 1940)
- Initiation (December 21, 1940)
- Pilgrimage (August 30, 1941)
- Home Repair (January 23, 1943)
- Locked It With the Key Outside (October 28, 1944)

Non-Fiction

- PROFILES: Recurrent and Irreducible (April 13, 1946)
- PROFILES: Choreographer (September 14, 1946)
- PROFILES: The Absolute Frontier (December 27, 1947)
- PROFILES: One Sweet Little Business (July 31, 1948)
- PROFILES: With Palette Knife and Skillet (May 28, 1949)
- PROFILES: T-Bars and I-Dots (December 24, 1949)
- PROFILES: Down the Leash (November 24, 1951)
- PROFILES: LILT (February 7, 1953)
