= Helen Hull Law =

American professor of Latin and Greek (1890–1966)

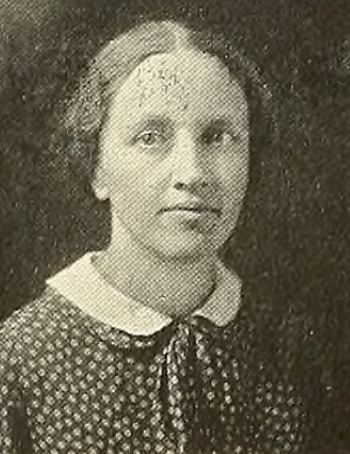
- Helen Hull Law, from the 1929 yearbook of Wellesley College
- Born: February 26, 1890; Brooklyn, New York, U.S.
- Died: November 11, 1966 (age 76); Winter Park, Florida, U.S.
- Education: Vassar College
- Occupations: Professor of Latin and Greek

Helen Hull Law (February 26, 1890 – November 11, 1966) was an American college professor and scholar of Latin and Greek. She taught at Meredith College in North Carolina from 1914 to 1926, and at Wellesley College from 1926 until she retired in 1954.

== Early life and education ==
Law was born in Brooklyn, New York, in 1890, the daughter of George Elisha Law and Julia Ann Hull Law. Her father was a physician; he died in 1895. She was the president of her class at Fort Ann Union School in 1907. She graduated from Vassar College in 1911. She completed doctoral studies at the University of Chicago in 1920. Her dissertation, Studies in the songs of Plautine comedy, was reviewed by Cornelia C. Coulter in Classical Philology.

== Career ==
Law was a professor of Latin and Greek at Meredith College in Raleigh, North Carolina, from 1914 until 1926, where her "depth and breadth of scholarship would have frightened the freshmen had not her charming shyness made them feel that they must put her at ease." In 1923 she founded and organized the Kappa Nu Sigma honor society on campus; in 1927 she directed the play A Roman Wedding at Meredith. Law later became professor of Greek at Wellesley College, and retired in 1954 after 28 years.

The Classical Club at Meredith College was named the Helen Hull Law Classical Club in her honor, after she left that school.

== Publications ==
In 1932, Law published Bibliography of Greek Myth in English Poetry, with a Supplement published in 1941. In 1955, a revised edition was published which combines the two.

=== Books ===
- Studies in the songs of Plautine comedy (University of Chicago 1920) OCLC 16000880
- Law, H.H. (1955). Bibliography of Greek Myth in English Poetry. Bulletin (American Classical League). Folcroft Press. ISBN 978-0-8482-1545-3.
- Brotherton, B.E.M.; Law, H.H. (1978). The vocabulary of intrigue in Roman comedy. Latin Poetry Series. Garland Pub. ISBN 9780824029838.

=== Articles ===
- "The Name Galatea in the Pygmalion Myth" (1932, The Classical Journal)
- "Pater's Use of Greek Quotations" (1943, Modern Language Notes)

== Personal life ==
Law traveled in the Mediterranean in 1934. She moved to Florida in 1958, and was active in the Winter Park Benefit Association. She died in Winter Park, Florida, in November 1966, at the age of 76.
