= Elizabeth Williams Champney =

American writer (1850–1922)

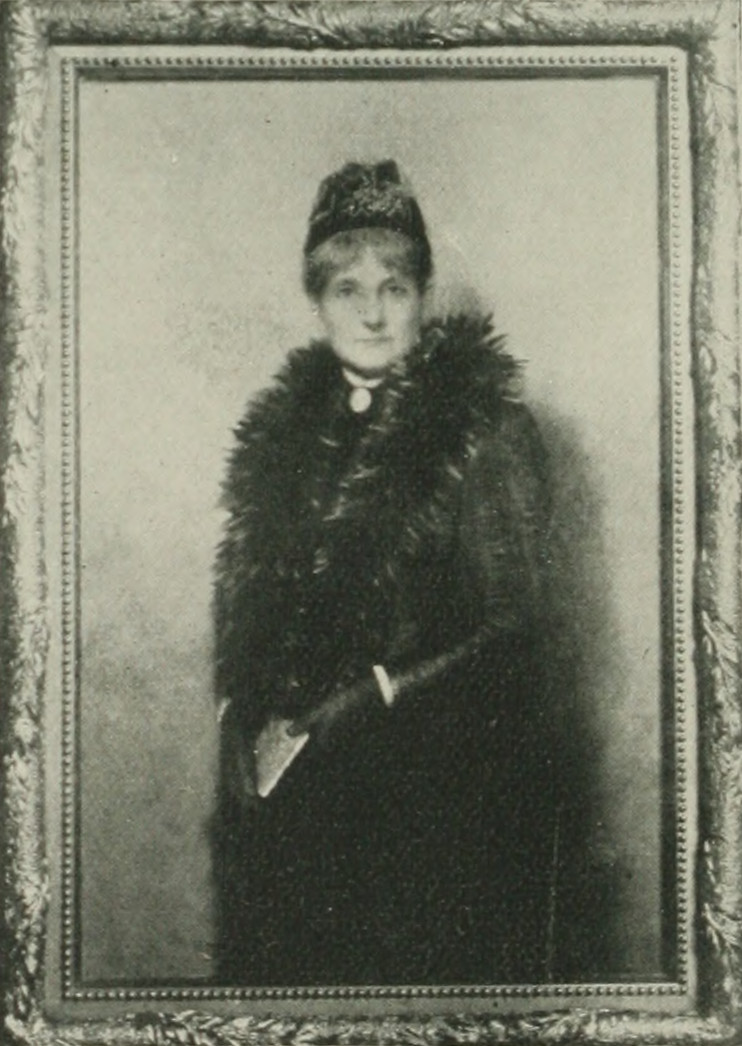
- Elizabeth Williams Champney circa 1893
- Born: Elizabeth ("Lizzie") Johnson Williams; February 6, 1850; Springfield, Ohio, U.S.
- Died: October 13, 1922 (aged 72); Seattle, Washington, U.S.
- Education: Vassar College
- Occupation: author
- Spouse: James Wells Champney (m. 1873; died 1903)
- Children: 2
- Writing career
- Language: English
- Period: 1876–1921
- Genres: novels, travel writing, juvenile literature

Elizabeth Williams Champney (February 6, 1850 – October 13, 1922) was an American author of novels and juvenile literature, as well as travel writing, most of which featured foreign locations. Champney's observations and experiences during her European travels were published in Harper's Magazine, and also in The Century Magazine. She published eighty or more articles in Harper's and Century, including a series on Portugal, and papers entitled "A Neglected Corner of Europe", and "In the Footsteps of Futuney and Regnault". After her return to the United States, Champney wrote fifteen books; novels, stories for juveniles, and historical works under cover of stories, mostly adapted to young people. Her novels were originally directed mainly at young girls, including the Witch Winnie series and the Vassar Girls Abroad series, but she later wrote romantic semi-fictional fables of castles, such as The Romance of the Feudal Chäteaux (1899). The novels included, Bourbon Lilies, and Romany and Rue. Of the juveniles, All Around a Palette, and Howling Wolf and His Trick Pony were the most popular. The historical series included Great Grandmother Girls in New France and in Mexico. Her husband, James Wells Champney, was an artist. Their summer home was in Deerfield, Massachusetts, while the winter residence was in New York.

== Early years and education ==
Elizabeth Johnson Williams was born in Springfield, Ohio, on February 6, 1850. Her father was Judge S. B. Williams. Her parents, who were abolitionists, moved the family to Kansas Territory in her youth, to join the fight against the spread of slavery to Kansas. After the Civil War, she attended the Seminary for Young Ladies in Lexington, Massachusetts, where the artist James Wells Champney was her drawing instructor. She completed her education at Vassar College, where she received her A.B. in 1869, a member of the second class of Vassar graduates.

Very early in life, while still an ambitious student at Vassar, she determined on literature as her life's calling, and she recalled the first few stories, full of youthful enthusiasm, that were written at Vassar, which were secretly dispatched to magazine editors, and returned promptly.

== Career ==
=== Kansas, Massachusetts, New York ===
After graduation, she returned to Kansas, to Kansas State Agricultural College in Manhattan, Kansas, where she served as Secretary for the college and the first instructor of drawing at the school. While living in Kansas, she was engaged to be married to a farmer. However, the marriage apparently never took place, and in May 1873, she instead married James Wells Champney – her former drawing instructor – who happened to be traveling through Manhattan, Kansas, as part of a trip through the Louisiana Purchase to illustrate an article entitled The Great South by Edward King for Scribner’s Monthly. Her first published piece, a poem, was published six months after her marriage.

For three years after their marriage, the couple traveled through the southern United States and Europe before settling on the East Coast. In 1876, the Champneys, returned to the United States, and settled in Deerfield, Massachusetts. Champney began publishing travel fiction in Harper's Magazine. Her short stories were rapidly accepted. In the larger monthlies, both for children and adults, she contributed more than 86 articles, poems, and brief romances. In 1879, the couple acquired an additional home in New York City, where James opened a studio at 96 Fifth Avenue.

In 1880, the couple secured a contract to illustrate a series of articles for Century Magazine. For this endeavour, the pair embarked on travel to North Africa, Spain and Portugal, visiting localities, such as Tangier and Tétouan in Morocco, that not been covered by any of the illustrated magazines of the period. In Europe, they lived with gypsies, and also spent a brief period living with the rebels of Don Carlos. In Spain, they encountered the art of the Spanish realist, Mariano Fortuny and the French painter, Henri Regnault, and spent much of their time following in the artists' footsteps across Spain, France and Morocco. Between 1880 and 1890, the Champneys made several trips to Europe, and in 1890 Champney opened a studio in Paris. Between 1880 and 1890, the Champneys made several trips to Europe, and in 1890 Champney opened a studio in Paris.

The Champneys also continued to make frequent trips to Europe and other foreign locations, including North Africa, which provided material for both of their work, including England, France, Spain, Portugal, Morocco, and other well-known and less known portions of Europe. It was near this same period she attempted her first novel, that met with some success, was highly spoken of by critics, but did not achieve for her the accolades she had wished. In 1881, a romance, Rosemary and Rue, appeared, and it was widely admired.

=== Two series for girls ===
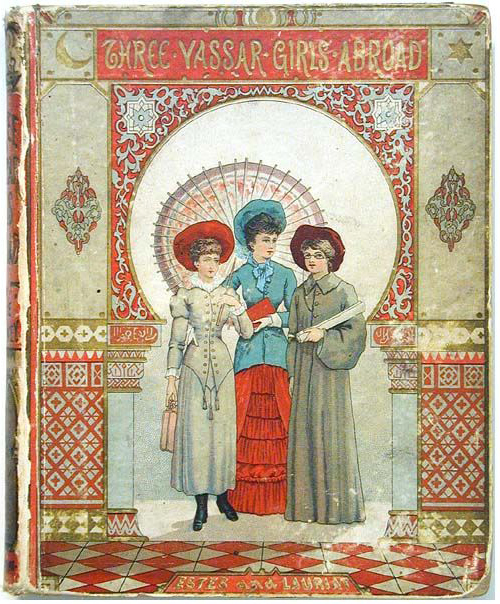
Cover of Champney's Three Vassar Girls Abroad

In 1883, she published the first of her long-running "Three Vassar Girls Abroad" novels for young girls. The "Vassar Girls" series eventually contained eleven novels, the last of which, Three Vassar Girls in the Holy Land, was published in 1892. The books were published by Estes & Lauriat, a publishing house in Boston.

During this time, Champney wrote many additional books, such as Howling Wolf, and his Trick-Pony, designed more especially for boy than girl readers. Among her historical stories for youth is "Great-Grandmother Girls in New France", suggested by the Native American massacre in Deerfield, Massachusetts.

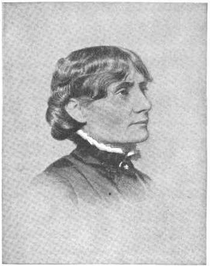
Elizabeth Champney (1890)

The first of her "Witch Winnie" books was published by White and Allen in 1889, entitled Witch Winnie: The Story of a "King's Daughter". The subject of the series is not a practitioner of witchcraft, but rather a mischievous young school-girl, and the first book is dedicated to Champney's daughter ("My Little Witch Marie"). The "Witch Winnie" series eventually contained nine books, the last of which, Witch Winnie in Spain, was published in 1898. Dodd, Mead and Company published an edition of the first book in 1891 and was the original publisher of the rest of the series. Later A. L. Chatteron of New York picked up the series as a reprint company.

=== Adult fiction ===
From 1899, Champney concentrated on more adult books, writing romantic, semi-fictional descriptions and stories of foreign locations, beginning with The Romance of the Feudal Chäteaux. From Portugal, she wrote a collection of magazine articles, and with her artist husband, she traveled into Africa, following “in the footsteps of Fortuny and Regnault,” which experiences were detailed in the Century. She ultimately wrote nine books in this "Romance" series, the last of which, The Romance of Russia, from Rurik to Bolshevik, was published in 1921, one year before her death in 1922. The books in this series were published by G. P. Putnam's Sons. In addition to her three main series of books, Champney also had several other books published.

== Personal life ==
James illustrated some of his wife's books. They made their winter home in New York City, and their summers were spent in "Elmstead", the old-fashioned house built in Deerfield, Massachusetts, by Champney's grandfather.

The couple had a son, Edouard Frère Champney, born in France on May 4, 1874, and a daughter, Maria Mitchell Champney, born in 1877. Edouard was an architect and died childless in 1929. Marie became an artist, married John S. Humphreys, and predeceased Elizabeth on December 1, 1906, at the age of thirty. Marie's son, George H. Humphreys, born in 1903, was a noted surgeon in New York City.

James died in an elevator accident in New York City in 1903, after which Elizabeth moved to the West Coast, where she lived near her son, Edouard, until her death. The last of her "Romance" books were co-written with her son.

Elizabeth died on October 13, 1922, in Seattle, Washington, while visiting her son there.

== Style and themes ==
Champney carefully avoided embellishments and fancies which might mislead her young readers into historical misconceptions. She knew how to make them pleasant without drawing on her inner consciousness, where facts are concerned. She could be humorous too as evidenced by the poem published in St. Nicholas, for 1876, "How Persimmon Took Cah ob de Baby". Beside her magazine stories for children, she wrote fourteen juvenile books. She showed special preference for pictures of studio and artistic life, and sketches dealing with incidents and characters of the past. She sometimes used dialects, whether Afro-American, Irish, German, or Indian.
