= Geoffrey A. Jehle =

American economist

- Born: United States

Academic background
- Education: Princeton University, Kalamazoo College

Academic work
- Discipline: Economics
- Institutions: Vassar College, Columbia University

Geoffrey A. Jehle is a professor in economics at Vassar College. And also, he serves as faculty in the Program in Economic Policy Management (PEPM) at School of International and Public Affairs, Columbia University. Jehle's work is on microeconomic theory and international trade but he is perhaps best known for the textbook Advanced microeconomic theory written jointly with Philip J. Reny.

== Selected publications ==
- Geoffrey Alexander Jehle; Philip J. Reny (2001). Advanced Microeconomic Theory. Addison-Wesley. ISBN 978-0-321-07916-9.
