= Claudia L. Thomas =

American orthopedic surgeon

Claudia Lynn Thomas
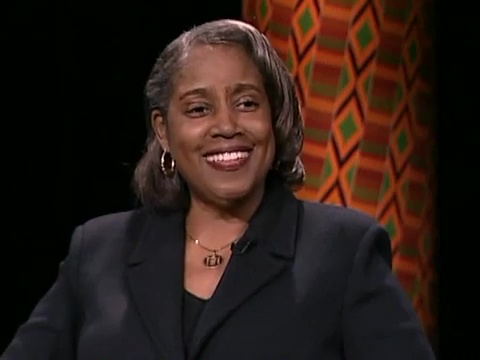
- Thomas on CUNY TV's African American Legends, 2007
- Born: Brooklyn, New York, U.S.
- Education: Johns Hopkins School of Medicine
- Occupation: Orthopedic Surgeon
- Known for: First Female African-American Orthopedic Surgeon
- Parent(s): Charles Thomas, Daisy Thomas

Claudia L. Thomas is the first female African-American orthopedic surgeon in the United States. She attended medical school at Johns Hopkins University. She was the first African-American and woman to be admitted to the Yale medical program in orthopedics. She strives to increase the number of minority students in medical school and to help decrease racial bias in the healthcare industry. While in her undergrad at Vassar College she helped form the Students' Afro-American Society (SAS), whose members pushed for the creation of a Black Studies program at the college. She has overcome kidney failure which was exacerbated by a hurricane and is a cancer survivor.

== Early life ==
Claudia Lynn Thomas was born in Brooklyn and raised in Queens, New York, by her parents, Charles and Daisy Thomas, and with her older sister, Catharine Thomas. Growing up, Thomas believed her parents were her biggest motivators. Her father, Charles, worked multiple jobs during the depression, and eventually became a welder in the Brooklyn Navy Yard. Thomas was also inspired by her childhood pediatrician, Pearl Foster, MD, an African-American woman. In spite of the fact that Thomas' parents were denied higher education, that did not

== Education ==
Education has always been a very important aspect of Thomas' life. Before she and her sister started kindergarten, their mother taught them their letters and numbers. Thomas attended the High School of Music and Art in New York City. She had high enough test scores that allowed her to be awarded a National Merit Scholarship and New York Regent Scholarship. For her undergraduate degree, Thomas enrolled in Vassar College as a math major; however, she graduated and earned her degree in Black Studies. Thomas attended Johns Hopkins University School of Medicine and completed her residency at the Yale University Orthopedic Program, making her the first woman to graduate from the program. Thomas is also the first female African American Orthopedic surgeon in the United States.

== Career ==
Thomas commenced her orthopedic residency at Yale-New Haven Hospital in New Haven, Connecticut in 1975. In 1980, Thomas completed a fellowship at the University of Maryland Medical Center in Baltimore in the shock trauma unit. In 1981, she went on to serve as assistant professor of orthopedic surgery at the Johns Hopkins University School of Medicine in Baltimore Maryland. In 1991, Thomas earned a position on the Maryland medical Licensure board as a part-time consultant. In 2004, Thomas joined a private practice at the Tri County Orthopedic Center in Leesburg, Florida.

== Social impact ==
While attending Vassar College, Thomas helped create the Students’ Afro-American Society on campus. The Students' Afro-American Society held seminars on black oriented issues on campus. The SAS pushed for the college to create a Black Studies Major even though the funding for the program was not guaranteed for renewal. The SAS did succeed in getting a Black Studies Major created after they staged a takeover of Vassar’s main building in October, 1969. The takeover lasted for three days until the college gave in and created a Black Studies Major and promised to hire more black professors. The program brought leading faculty members to the school and offered a six-week trip to Africa. While on the faculty at Johns Hopkins University of Medicine, she helped recruit the largest number of minorities and women to train in orthopedics at Johns Hopkins. Thomas was awarded the American Academy of Orthopedic Surgeons Diversity Award in 2008 for her efforts in improving diversity within her field and for mentoring and being a role model. Thomas currently mentors middle school aged boys with her peers in Leesburg, Florida.
