= List of Guggenheim Fellowships awarded in 1962 =

Two hundred and seventy scholars and artists were awarded Guggenheim Fellowships in 1962. More than $1,410,000 was disbursed.

== 1962 U.S. and Canadian Fellows ==
Category	Field of Study	Fellow	Institutional association	Research topic	Notes	Ref
Creative Arts	Fiction	Evan Shelby Connell		Writing		
Creative Arts	Fiction	John C. Hawkes	Brown University	Writing		
Creative Arts	Fiction	Edward Lewis Wallant	McCann Erickson	Writing		
Creative Arts	Fiction	Thomas Alonzo Williams, Jr.	University of New Hampshire	Writing		
Creative Arts	Fiction	Clara Brussel Winston		Writing		
Creative Arts	Fiction	Richard Yates		Writing	Also won in 1980	
Creative Arts	Fine Arts	John Burton		Interviewing glassmaking experts		
Creative Arts	Fine Arts	Richard Howard Hunt	University of Illinois	Sculpture		
Creative Arts	Fine Arts	Victor George Kord	University of Illinois	Painting		
Creative Arts	Fine Arts	Rico Lebrun		Painting	Also won in 1935, 1937	
Creative Arts	Fine Arts	Bruno Lucchesi	The New School for Social Research			
Creative Arts	Fine Arts	Ezio Martinelli	Sarah Lawrence College, Parsons School of Design	Sculpture	Also won in 1958	
Creative Arts	Fine Arts	M. Dean Richardson	Rhode Island School of Design			
Creative Arts	Fine Arts	Seymour Rosofsky	Wright Junior College, Art Institute of Chicago	Painting	Also won in 1963	
Creative Arts	Fine Arts	Whitney Lee Savage				
Creative Arts	Fine Arts	Benton Murdoch Spruance	Beaver College, Philadelphia College Museum of Arts	Printmaking	Also won in 1950	
Creative Arts	Fine Arts	Ann Steinbrocker				
Creative Arts	Fine Arts	James Stephen Strombotne	University of California, Riverside	Painting		
Creative Arts	Fine Arts	Ansei Uchima	Sarah Lawrence College	Printmaking	Also won in 1970	
Creative Arts	Fine Arts	Hiram D. Williams	University of Florida			
Creative Arts	Fine Arts	James N. Wines		Sculpture		
Creative Arts	Music Composition	John C. Eaton	University of Chicago	Composing	Also won in 1965	
Creative Arts	Music Composition	John Huggler		Composing	Also won in 1969	
Creative Arts	Music Composition	John Herbert McDowell		Composing		
Creative Arts	Music Composition	Robert Walter Moevs	Harvard University	Composing		
Creative Arts	Music Composition	Gunther A. Schuller		Composing	Also won in 1963	
Creative Arts	Music Composition	Ezra Sims		Composing		
Creative Arts	Music Composition	John Nathaniel Vincent, Jr.	University of California, Los Angeles	Composing		
Creative Arts	Music Composition	Stefan Wolpe	Long Island University		Also won in 1970	
Creative Arts	Photography	Lee Friedlander		Changing American scene	Also won in 1960, 1977	
Creative Arts	Photography	Geraldine Sharpe		Certain social groups		
Creative Arts	Poetry	Denise Levertov		Writing		
Creative Arts	Poetry	Galway Kinnell		Writing	Also won in 1974	
Creative Arts	Poetry	Edward Charles O'Gorman	Columbia University	Writing	Also won in 1956	
Creative Arts	Poetry	Louis Simpson	University of California, Berkeley	Writing	Also won in 1970	
Humanities	American Literature	Ihab Habib Hassan	Wesleyan University	Irrational strain in Western literature	Also won in 1958	
Humanities	American Literature	John Fairbanks Lynen	University of Illinois	Time as a structural principle in the works of certain American authors		
Humanities	American Literature	Ellen Moers				
Humanities	American Literature	Blake Reynolds Nevius	University of California, Los Angeles	Comparative study of the novels and critical writings of Nathaniel Hawthorne, George Eliot, and Henry James		
Humanities	American Literature	Donald Pizer	Newcomb College	Critical study of novels of Frank Norris		
Humanities	American Literature	Merton M. Sealts, Jr.	Lawrence College	Journals of Ralph Waldo Emerson		
Humanities	American Literature	Floyd C. Watkins	Emory University			
Humanities	Architecture, Design and Planning	Robert Branner		13th-century Gothic architecture		
Humanities	Architecture, Design and Planning	George R. Collins		Ideas influencing the development of the city, 1880-1920		
Humanities	British History	Philip P. Poirier	Ohio State University			
Humanities	East Asian Studies	Immanuel C. Y. Hsu	University of California, Santa Barbara	Chinese-Russian relations between 1871 and 1881		
Humanities	East Asian Studies	Joseph Richmond Levenson	University of California, Berkeley	Confucian China and its modern fate		
Humanities	Economic History	Ellis Rivkin	Hebrew Union College	Role of Jews in the development of early capitalism		
Humanities	English Literature	Jerome Beaty				
Humanities	English Literature	Harold Bloom	Yale University			
Humanities	English Literature	Robert C. Elliott	Ohio State University		Also won in 1971	
Humanities	English Literature	Phillip Harth	Northwestern University	Religious and philosophical background of the poems of John Dryden		
Humanities	English Literature	Simeon Kahn Heninger, Jr.	Duke University	Influence of Pythagorean thought in the Renaissance		
Humanities	English Literature	Park Honan	Connecticut College	Prose style in the English novel	Also won in 1975	
Humanities	English Literature	Cyrus Henry Hoy	Vanderbilt University	Dramatic works of Thomas Dekker		
Humanities	English Literature	William Irvine	Stanford University	Critical biography of Robert Browning	Also won in 1955	
Humanities	English Literature	Lachlan Philip Kelley		Definitive edition of correspondence between Elizabeth Barrett Browning and Robert Browning	Also won in 1970	
Humanities	English Literature	Francis Edward Mineka	Cornell University	Letters of John Stuart Mill		
Humanities	English Literature	William Riley Parker	Indiana University	Life and times of John Milton		
Humanities	English Literature	Miriam Kosh Starkman	Queens College, City University of New York			
Humanities	English Literature	Robert Henry Super	University of Michigan		Also won in 1970	
Humanities	English Literature	Paul Noden West	Memorial University of Newfoundland, Pennsylvania State University			
Humanities	Fine Arts Research	James Holderbaum	Smith College	16th-century Italian painting and sculpture		
Humanities	Fine Arts Research	Homer Leonard Thomas	University of Missouri	Influence of Mediterranean civilizations on uncivilized cultures of Europe during the late Bronze and Iron Ages		
Humanities	Folklore and Cultural Studies	Américo Paredes	University of Texas	Bilingual and bicultural folklore in Mexico and the southwestern US		
Humanities	Folklore and Cultural Studies	Frank O. Spinney	Saint-Gaudens National Historical Park	Biography on Augustus Saint-Gaudens		
Humanities	French History	James Edward King	University of North Carolina	Origins and evolution of the concepts of welfare in the modern Western world		
Humanities	French Literature	W. Wolfgang Holdheim	Brandeis University	Contemporary French writing		
Humanities	French Literature	Walter Adolf Strauss	Emory University			
Humanities	French Literature	Aram Vartanian	University of Minnesota			
Humanities	German and Scandinavian Literature	Stefán Einarsson	Johns Hopkins University	Primitivism and Christian influence in Old Icelandic literature		
Humanities	German and Scandinavian Literature	Wolfgang Leppmann	University of Oregon	Stage history of Goethe's plays	Also won in 1971	
Humanities	German and Scandinavian Literature	William Henry Rey	University of Washington	Life and works of Arthur Schnitzler		
Humanities	German and Scandinavian Literature	Oskar Seidlin	Ohio State University		Also won in 1976	
Humanities	German and Scandinavian Literature	Blake Lee Spahr	University of California, Berkeley	17th-century German literary manuscripts		
Humanities	German and Scandinavian Literature	Jack Madison Stein	Harvard University	Relation between text and musical setting in German songs of the 18th and 19th centuries	Also won in 1954	
Humanities	General Nonfiction	Richard S. Allen		Covered bridges of the American south and midwest		
Humanities	German and East European History	Stephen Fischer-Galați	Wayne State University	Balkan revolutionary tradition		
Humanities	German and East European History	Norman Rich	Michigan State University	Germany's war aims and occupation policies in World War II		
Humanities	German and East European History	Gunther Erich Rothenberg	Southern Illinois University	History of the Austrian military border in Croatia and Slavonia during the 19th century		
Humanities	History of Science and Technology	William Harris Stahl	Brooklyn College	History of science in the Latin West during the late Roman Empire and early Middle Ages		
Humanities	History of Science and Technology	Robert Smith Woodbury	Massachusetts Institute of Technology			
Humanities	Iberian and Latin American History	Stanley George Payne	University of Minnesota			
Humanities	Italian Literature	Donald Selwyn Carne-Ross	University of Texas	Ludovico Ariosto's Orlando Furioso		
Humanities	Italian Literature	Ernst Pulgram	University of Michigan		Also won in 1954	
Humanities	Italian Literature	Charles S. Singleton	Johns Hopkins University	Dante's Divine Comedy	Also won in 1954, 1950	
Humanities	Linguistics	William Stewart Cornyn	Yale University			
Humanities	Linguistics	Henry R. Kahane	University of Illinois	Linguistic history	Also won in 1955	
Humanities	Literary Criticism	Richard Volney Chase	Columbia University		Also won in 1947	
Humanities	Literary Criticism	Tom F. Driver	Union Theological Seminary			
Humanities	Literary Criticism	Martin Greenberg	New School for Social Research	Franz Kafka		
Humanities	Literary Criticism	Harrison Mosher Hayford	Northwestern University	Works of Herman Melville		
Humanities	Literary Criticism	Edwin Honig	Brown University		Also won in 1948	
Humanities	Literary Criticism	Morton Dauwen Zabel	University of Chicago	Biographical and critical studies of Joseph Conrad and Henrik Ibsen	Also won in 1944	
Humanities	Medieval History	Gerard E. Caspary	Smith College			
Humanities	Medieval Literature	Robert Payson Creed	Brown University			
Humanities	Medieval Literature	Richard Hamilton Green	Johns Hopkins University	Poetic theory by the 14th-century Italian humanists		
Humanities	Medieval Literature	Nicholas M. Haring	Pontifical Institute of Mediaeval Studies		Also won in 1958	
Humanities	Medieval Literature	Charles Muscatine	University of California	Style of medieval poetry		
Humanities	Medieval Literature	Paul A. Olson	University of Nebraska	Canterbury Tales as setting forth the 14th-century concept of a good society		
Humanities	Medieval Literature	Barry Ulanov	Barnard College, Columbia University			
Humanities	Music Research	Richard Franko Goldman	Princeton University	Nature and function of music in the middle of the 20th century		
Humanities	Music Research	Carleen M. Hutchins		Quality of tone in musical instruments of the violin family	Also won in 1959	
Humanities	Music Research	Carol Cook MacClintock	Southern Illinois University	Life and works of Giaches de Wert		
Humanities	Music Research	Leonard Gilbert Ratner	Stanford University	Musical form of the Viennese Classic period		
Humanities	Music Research	Robert M. Stevenson	University of California, Los Angeles	Spanish music in the Old and New Worlds during the Baroque period		
Humanities	Near Eastern Studies	Edmund Irwin Gordon	Harvard University			
Humanities	Near Eastern Studies	Anne Draffkorn Kilmer	University of Chicago	Lexical texts of ancient Mesopotamia	Also won in 1961	
Humanities	Near Eastern Studies	Moses Zucker	Jewish Theological Seminary of America			
Humanities	Philosophy	David Braybrooke	Yale University			
Humanities	Philosophy	Herbert Hochberg	Indiana University	Writings of G. E. Moore		
Humanities	Philosophy	Hans Meyerhoff	University of California, Los Angeles	Philosophy of history		
Humanities	Philosophy	John R. Silber	University of Texas	Nature of human acts and responsibility		
Humanities	Philosophy	Marcus George Singer	University of Wisconsin	Moral problems and moral philosophy		
Humanities	Philosophy	Robert Paul Ziff	University of Pennsylvania	Relationship between feelings and behavior		
Humanities	Religion	Ford Lewis Battles	Hartford Seminary Foundation	Ecumenical foundations of the Reformation		
Humanities	Religion	Schubert Miles Ogden	Southern Methodist University			
Humanities	Russian History	Henry Lithgow Roberts	Columbia University			
Humanities	Russian History	Theodore H. Von Laue	University of California, Riverside		Also won in 1974	
Humanities	South Asian Studies	Knight Biggerstaff	Cornell University	China during the 19th and 20th centuries		
Humanities	Spanish and Portuguese Literature	José Rubia Barcia	University of California, Los Angeles	Works of Ramon del Valle Inclan		
Humanities	Spanish and Portuguese Literature	James O. Crosby	University of Illinois	Francisco de Quevedo's The Politics of God		
Humanities	Spanish and Portuguese Literature	George Haley	University of Chicago	Spanish poetry of the 16th and 17th centuries		
Humanities	Spanish and Portuguese Literature	Russell P. Sebold	University of Wisconsin	18th-century Spanish literature		
Humanities	Theatre Arts	Herbert Blau	San Francisco State College	Theater in relation to contemporary cultural history	Also won in 1977	
Humanities	Theatre Arts	Barnard Hewitt	University of Illinois	Stephen Price		
Humanities	Theatre Arts	Louis Sheaffer		Biography of Eugene O'Neill	Also won in 1959, 1969	
Humanities	Theatre Arts	Alexander William Szögyi	Hunter College			
Humanities	United States History	Carl Bridenbaugh	University of California, Berkeley	American people in the colonial period	Also won in 1958, 1968	
Humanities	United States History	Forrest McDonald	Brown University			
Humanities	United States History	Bradford Perkins	University of California, Los Angeles	Relations between the United States and England, 1812-1823		
Humanities	United States History	Merrill D. Peterson	Brandeis University			
Humanities	United States History	Hugh Franklin Rankin	Tulane University	British military strategy in the American Revolution		
Natural Sciences	Applied Mathematics	Karl Thomas Aust	General Electric Research Laboratory			
Natural Sciences	Applied Mathematics	Sol R. Bodner	Brown University			
Natural Sciences	Applied Mathematics	Walter Freiberger	Brown University			
Natural Sciences	Applied Mathematics	David Gale	Brown University		Also won in 1981	
Natural Sciences	Applied Mathematics	Fritz John	New York University		Also won in 1969	
Natural Sciences	Applied Mathematics	Ralph David Kodis	Harvard University, Brown University			
Natural Sciences	Applied Mathematics	Cornelius Thomas Leondes	University of California, Los Angeles	Theory of modern advanced control systems		
Natural Sciences	Applied Mathematics	Eric Reissner	Massachusetts Institute of Technology	Derivation of two-dimensional theories of thin elastic shells from equations of three-dimensional elasticity		
Natural Sciences	Applied Mathematics	Fred L. Ribe	Los Alamos Scientific Laboratory	Processes in high temperature laboratory plasmas and their applications to astrophysical problems		
Natural Sciences	Astronomy and Astrophysics	George Whipple Clark	Massachusetts Institute of Technology	Properties of primary cosmic gamma rays and of neutrons associated with solar disturbances		
Natural Sciences	Astronomy and Astrophysics	Frank Norman Edmonds, Jr.	University of Texas	Stellar atmospheres and analysis of spectral lines		
Natural Sciences	Astronomy and Astrophysics	Paul J Kellogg	University of Minnesota	Generation and propagation of waves in the Earth's exosphere		
Natural Sciences	Astronomy and Astrophysics	William L. Kraushaar	Massachusetts Institute of Technology	Galactic structure	Also won in 1973	
Natural Sciences	Astronomy and Astrophysics	George Cunliffe McVittie	University of Illinois	Predictions of theoretical models of the universe	Also won in 1970	
Natural Sciences	Astronomy and Astrophysics	Forrest S. Mozer	The Aerospace Corporation Physics Laboratory	Atmospheric physics		
Natural Sciences	Chemistry	Henry Ernest Baumgarten	University of Nebraska	Molecular structure of small-ring compounds		
Natural Sciences	Chemistry	Charles DuBois Coryell	Massachusetts Institute of Technology	Nuclear energetics		
Natural Sciences	Chemistry	Lawrence Joseph Heidt	Massachusetts Institute of Technology	Solar energy conversion		
Natural Sciences	Chemistry	Noah R. Johnson, Jr.	Oak Ridge National Laboratory	Nuclear spectroscopy		
Natural Sciences	Chemistry	Kenneth David Kopple	University of Chicago	Synthesis of peptides for use in investigations of chemical phenomena of biological importance		
Natural Sciences	Chemistry	Isadore Perlman	University of California, Berkeley	Nuclear spectroscopy	Also won in 1955	
Natural Sciences	Chemistry	Donald Turner Sawyer, Jr.	University of California, Riverside			
Natural Sciences	Chemistry	Harold Abraham Scheraga	Cornell University	Interactions between the side chains of proteins	Also won in 1956	
Natural Sciences	Chemistry	R. Martin Stiles	University of Michigan			
Natural Sciences	Chemistry	Theodore Vermeulen	University of California, Berkeley	Mechanisms of molecular transport across liquid interfaces		
Natural Sciences	Chemistry	John Stewart Waugh	Massachusetts Institute of Technology	Theory of spin resonance		
Natural Sciences	Chemistry	Frank Henry Westheimer	Harvard University			
Natural Sciences	Chemistry	Richard L. Wolfgang	Yale University	Chemical reaction mechanisms of high-energy atoms	Also won in 1971	
Natural Sciences	Chemistry	Arthur E. Woodward	Pennsylvania State University	Dynamic properties of high polymer crystals		
Natural Sciences	Computer Science	Gerald Estrin	University of California, Los Angeles	Effectiveness of automatic structure change in computer complexes	Also won in 1967	
Natural Sciences	Computer Science	Gerard Salton	Harvard University			
Natural Sciences	Earth Sciences	Harmon Craig	Scripps Institution of Oceanography			
Natural Sciences	Earth Sciences	Frank W. Dickson	University of California	Alkalic igneous rocks		
Natural Sciences	Earth Sciences	William Sefton Fyfe	University of California, Berkeley	Advances in chemical thermodynamics and related sciences as they apply to geophysical research	Also won in 1983	
Natural Sciences	Earth Sciences	Henry William Menard, Jr.	University of California, San Diego; Churchill College			
Natural Sciences	Earth Sciences	Walter Munk	Scripps Institution of Oceanography		Also won in 1948, 1953	
Natural Sciences	Earth Sciences	Jerry S. Olson	Oak Ridge National Laboratory	Development and maintenance of ecological systems		
Natural Sciences	Earth Sciences	Karl K. Turekian	Yale University			
Natural Sciences	Earth Sciences	Hildegarde Howard Wylde	Natural History Museum of Los Angeles County			
Natural Sciences	Engineering	Andrew F. Charwat	University of California, Los Angeles	Initial region of flow immediately downstream of an ideally sharp leading edge of flat plate in compressible flow		
Natural Sciences	Engineering	Philip Graham Hill	Massachusetts Institute of Technology			
Natural Sciences	Engineering	Francis Reynolds Shanley	University of California, Los Angeles	Studies toward the development of a unified philosophy of structural design		
Natural Sciences	Engineering	Kenneth Noble Stevens	Massachusetts Institute of Technology	Speech movements with cineradiographic motion pictures		
Natural Sciences	Engineering	Jean G. Van Bladel	University of Wisconsin	Electromagnetic theory with emphasis on propagation in anisotropic media		
Natural Sciences	Mathematics	Frank H. Brownell	University of Washington	Mathematical formulation of the quantum radiation theory		
Natural Sciences	Mathematics	Eugenio Calabi	University of Minnesota			
Natural Sciences	Mathematics	Kurt Otto Friedrichs	New York University	Asymptotic phenomena and other problems in mathematical physics		
Natural Sciences	Mathematics	Simon Bernard Kochen	Cornell University			
Natural Sciences	Mathematics	Irving Reiner	University of Illinois	Representations of finite groups in rings of integers		
Natural Sciences	Mathematics	Michio Suzuki	University of Illinois	Structure of a class of doubly transitive groups		
Natural Sciences	Mathematics	Richard Steven Varga	Case Institute of Technology			
Natural Sciences	Medicine and Health	John S. Gray	Northwestern University	Respiratory physiology		
Natural Sciences	Medicine and Health	Joseph Hirsh	Albert Einstein College of Medicine			
Natural Sciences	Molecular and Cellular Biology	Daniel I. Arnon	University of California, Berkeley	Energy conversion process in photosynthesis	Also won in 1946	
Natural Sciences	Molecular and Cellular Biology	Clarence Willet Asling	University of California, Berkeley	Endocrine regulation of differential growth and maturation of the skull		
Natural Sciences	Molecular and Cellular Biology	Domingo M. Aviado	University of Pennsylvania	Action of certain drugs on pulmonary circulation		
Natural Sciences	Molecular and Cellular Biology	Chen Kang Chai	Roscoe B. Jackson Memorial Laboratory	Effects of inbreeding		
Natural Sciences	Molecular and Cellular Biology	Waldo E. Cohn	Oak Ridge National Laboratory	Nucleic acid biochemistry	Also won in 1955	
Natural Sciences	Molecular and Cellular Biology	William Zev Hassid	University of California, Berkeley	Role of nucleotide disphosphate sugar in carbohydrate metabolism of plants	Also won in 1955	
Natural Sciences	Molecular and Cellular Biology	George Paul Hess	Cornell University	Conformational changes accompanying enzyme catalyzed reactions		
Natural Sciences	Molecular and Cellular Biology	Lucille S. Hurley	University of California, Davis	Influence of environment factors on the development of the mammalian fetus and neonatal young	Also won in 1969	
Natural Sciences	Molecular and Cellular Biology	Alvin Isaac Krasna	Columbia University			
Natural Sciences	Molecular and Cellular Biology	Albert L. Lehninger	Johns Hopkins University	Tertiary and quaternary structure of protein-lipid complexes	Also won in 1951	
Natural Sciences	Molecular and Cellular Biology	William J. Rutter	University of Illinois	Molecular control of cellular differentiation		
Natural Sciences	Molecular and Cellular Biology	Esmond Emerson Snell	University of California, Berkeley	Biochemistry of growth and nutrition	Also won in 1954, 1970	
Natural Sciences	Molecular and Cellular Biology	Sidney Solomon	Medical College of Virginia	Renal electrolyte transport		
Natural Sciences	Molecular and Cellular Biology	Robert Greenblatt Stanley	United States Forest Service Experimental Station	Protein-enzyme formation in relation to incompatibility relations of pollen		
Natural Sciences	Molecular and Cellular Biology	Lee Wolff Wattenberg	University of Minnesota			
Natural Sciences	Organismic Biology and Ecology	Sam Meyer Beiser	Columbia University			
Natural Sciences	Organismic Biology and Ecology	Andrew John Berger	University of Michigan			
Natural Sciences	Organismic Biology and Ecology	Edgar J. Boell	Yale University			
Natural Sciences	Organismic Biology and Ecology	Nicholas E. Collias	University of California, Los Angeles	Origin and effects of domestication of the Red junglefowl		
Natural Sciences	Organismic Biology and Ecology	Joseph Hurd Connell	University of California, Santa Barbara	Ecology of marine shore organisms	Also won in 1971	
Natural Sciences	Organismic Biology and Ecology	Lois Crisler		Wolves		
Natural Sciences	Organismic Biology and Ecology	William Ryan Dawson	University of Michigan			
Natural Sciences	Organismic Biology and Ecology	Carl Barton Huffaker	University of California, Berkeley	Natural control of animal and plant populations		
Natural Sciences	Organismic Biology and Ecology	Robert Wharton Morris	University of Oregon	Oxygen consumption of fish in southern temperature latitudes		
Natural Sciences	Organismic Biology and Ecology	Lionel Israel Rebhun	Princeton University	Living cell structure and function		
Natural Sciences	Organismic Biology and Ecology	Curt Stern	University of California	Problems of differentiation in relation to genes	Also won in 1951	
Natural Sciences	Organismic Biology and Ecology	Talbot H. Waterman	Yale University			
Natural Sciences	Organismic Biology and Ecology	William Abell Wimsatt	Cornell University	Reproductive physiology and eye structure in tropical bats		
Natural Sciences	Physics	Ernest Ambler	National Bureau of Standards	Cooperative properties of spin systems at low temperatures		
Natural Sciences	Physics	Robert Demo Bent	Indiana University	Short nuclear lifetimes by the Doppler-shift attenuation method		
Natural Sciences	Physics	Albéric Boivin	Laval University	Electromagnetic optics		
Natural Sciences	Physics	Sheldon Jack Brown	Fresno State College	Gyromagnetic ratios of ferromagnetic elements and alloys		
Natural Sciences	Physics	Ugo Camerini	University of Wisconsin	Decay modes of neutral K-mesons		
Natural Sciences	Physics	Richard H. Capps	Northwestern University	Strong interactions of strange elementary particles, by means of the application of dispersion relations		
Natural Sciences	Physics	Robert Lee Chasson	University of Nebraska	Structure of interplanetary and interstellar magnetic fields		
Natural Sciences	Physics	Gordon Feldman	Johns Hopkins University	Strong interactions of elementary particles by means of the application of dispersion relations and invariance under groups of transformations		
Natural Sciences	Physics	Michael Wulf Friedlander	Washington University in St. Louis	Characteristics of cosmic radiation		
Natural Sciences	Physics	Bernard Goodman	University of Missouri	Mössbauer effect, X-ray and related radiation phenomena		
Natural Sciences	Physics	Isaac Halpern	University of Washington	Nuclear reactions		
Natural Sciences	Physics	A. Carl Helmholz	University of California, Berkeley	Pion nucleon interaction		
Natural Sciences	Physics	Jan Korringa	Ohio State University	Equilibrium properties and relaxation of interacting spin systems in liquid and solids		
Natural Sciences	Physics	James Charles Phillips	University of Chicago	Electronic structure of metals and semiconductors		
Natural Sciences	Physics	David Pines	University of Illinois	Elementary excitation in many-body problems	Also won in 1969	
Natural Sciences	Physics	Maurice Mandel Shapiro	United States Naval Research Laboratory	Cosmic ray interactions at ultrahigh energies and recent developments in the theory of nuclear structure		
Natural Sciences	Physics	Laszlo Tisza	Massachusetts Institute of Technology	Extension of thermodynamics to the microscopic structural properties of matter		
Natural Sciences	Physics	James Leslie Tuck	Los Alamos Scientific Laboratory	Plasma physics and molecular biology		
Natural Sciences	Physics	Joseph Weber	University of Maryland	Classical and quantized general relativity	Also won in 1955	
Natural Sciences	Physics	Chen Ning Yang	Institute for Advanced Study	Weak interactions and superconductivity		
Natural Sciences	Plant Sciences	Carl William Boothroyd	Cornell University	Pathogens of maize in Mexico and Central America		
Natural Sciences	Plant Sciences	Calvin J. Heusser	New York University			
Natural Sciences	Plant Sciences	Edgar Rothwell Lemon	Cornell University, United States Department of Agriculture			
Natural Sciences	Plant Sciences	James Gordon Ogden, III	Ohio Wesleyan University			
Natural Sciences	Statistics	Jack Carl Kiefer	Cornell University			
Social Sciences	Anthropology and Cultural Studies	William Y. Adams	UNESCO	Daily life in a Nubian village in the Sudan		
Social Sciences	Anthropology and Cultural Studies	J. Louis Giddings	Brown University			
Social Sciences	Anthropology and Cultural Studies	Alex Dony Krieger	University of Washington	Cultural and environment of early man in the new world		
Social Sciences	Anthropology and Cultural Studies	Oscar Lewis	University of Illinois	Culture of poverty and its transformation in contemporary Latin American communities	Also won in 1956	
Social Sciences	Anthropology and Cultural Studies	Leopold Pospisil	Yale University			
Social Sciences	Economics	Bruce Foster Johnston	Stanford University	Asian food economics		
Social Sciences	Economics	Harvey Leibenstein	University of California, Berkeley			
Social Sciences	Economics	Marc Nerlove	Stanford University	Economics	Also won in 1978	
Social Sciences	Economics	Henry Christopher Wallich	Yale University			
Social Sciences	Law	Gerald Gunther	Columbia University			
Social Sciences	Law	John Ernest Moffatt Hancock	Stanford University	Problems in conflicting laws		
Social Sciences	Law	Rudolf B. Schlesinger	Cornell University	Body of norms common to the world's leading legal systems		
Social Sciences	Law	Eric Stein	University of Michigan Law School			
Social Sciences	Law	Frederick Bernays Wiener		Recent Supreme Court decisions concerning military jurisdiction over civilians		
Social Sciences	Political Science	Murray Jacob Edelman	University of Illinois	Symbolic meanings of political acts and political institutions	Also won in 1983	
Social Sciences	Political Science	Elliot R. Goodman	Brown University			
Social Sciences	Political Science	A. Arthur Schiller	Columbia Law School		Also won in 1949, 1955	
Social Sciences	Political Science	Thomas L. Thorson	University of Wisconsin	Contributions of analytical philosophy and existentialism to modern political values		
Social Sciences	Psychology	Edwin A. Fleishman	Yale University			
Social Sciences	Psychology	Bertram H. Raven	University of California, Los Angeles	Field of group behavior		
Social Sciences	Sociology	Thomas R. Ford	University of Kentucky	Social and economic change in Latin America		
Social Sciences	Sociology	Everett Einar Hagen	Massachusetts Institute of Technology	Economic development in the British Isles		
Social Sciences	Sociology	Robert K. Merton	Bureau of Applied Social Research			
Social Sciences	Sociology	Georges Sabagh	University of Southern California			

== 1962 Latin American and Caribbean Fellows ==
Category	Field of Study	Fellow	Institutional association	Research topic	Notes	Ref
Creative Arts	Fine Arts	David Manzur Londoño	University of the Andes	Painting	Also won in 1961	
Creative Arts	Music Composition	Osvaldo Costa de Lacerda	Sociedade Pró Música Brasileira	Composing		
Humanities	Iberian and Latin American History	Alberto Mario E Salas	University of Buenos Aires		Also won in 1971	
Humanities	Latin American Literature	Antonio Pagés Larraya	University of Buenos Aires			
Humanities	Latin American Literature	Maria Concepcion Zardoya	Tulane University	Creative writing in poetry		
Natural Sciences	Applied Mathematics	Enrique Grünbaum Daniel	University of Chile		Also won in 1963	
Natural Sciences	Astronomy and Astrophysics	Carlos Alberto Altavista	La Plata Astronomical Observatory			
Natural Sciences	Chemistry	Vicente Guilherme Toscano	University of São Paulo			
Natural Sciences	Earth Science	Carlos Alberto Menéndez	Natural Sciences Argentine Museum, CONICET			
Natural Sciences	Earth Science	Rosendo Pascual	National University of La Plata			
Natural Sciences	Mathematics	José Barros-Neto	Yale University		Also won in 1961	
Natural Sciences	Mathematics	Juan Carlos Merlo	University of Buenos Aires		Also won in 1961	
Natural Sciences	Mathematics	Nelson Onuchic	São Paulo State University		Also won in 1961	
Natural Sciences	Medicine and Health	Oswaldo Grillo Rodríguez	Central University of Venezuela			
Natural Sciences	Molecular and Cellular Biology	Maria Luisa Dinamarca Gallardo	University of Chile			
Natural Sciences	Molecular and Cellular Biology	Jesús Torres Gallardo	Hospital for Nutritional Diseases			
Natural Sciences	Molecular and Cellular Biology	Victor Nussenzweig	University of São Paulo		Also won in 1964	
Natural Sciences	Molecular and Cellular Biology	José Oliver-González	University of Puerto Rico School of Medicine			
Natural Sciences	Molecular and Cellular Biology	Marino Villavicencio Núñez	National University of San Marcos		Also won in 1963	
Natural Sciences	Neuroscience	Enrique López Mendoza	National Institute of Cardiology		Also won in 1963, 1964	
Natural Sciences	Neuroscience	Guillermo R. J. Pilar	National Institute of Cardiology		Also won in 1960	
Natural Sciences	Organismic Biology and Ecology	Mercedes Delfinado	Department of Health			
Natural Sciences	Organismic Biology and Ecology	Armando F. Leanza	Pan American Argentina Oil Company			
Natural Sciences	Organismic Biology and Ecology	José Squadroni, S.J.	Catholic University of Uruguay			
Natural Sciences	Organismic Biology and Ecology	Carmen C. Velasquez	University of the Philippines		Also won in 1956	
Natural Sciences	Organismic Biology and Ecology	Abraham Willink	National University of Tucumán		Also won in 1948	
Natural Sciences	Plant Sciences	Maria Buchinger	National Forest Administration			
Natural Sciences	Plant Sciences	Gabriela Hässel de Menéndez	CONICET			
Natural Sciences	Plant Sciences	Elías Ramón de la Sota	National University of Tucumán		Also won in 1974	
Natural Sciences	Plant Sciences	Mario Héctor Ricardi Salinas	University of Concepción			
Social Sciences	Anthropology and Sociology	José Rafael Arboleda, S.J.	Pontificia Universidad Javeriana			
Social Sciences	Law	Shridath Surendranath Ramphal	West Indies Federation			
Social Sciences	Psychology	Claudio B. Naranjo Cohen	University of Chile			
Social Sciences	Sociology	Luiz de Aguiar Costa Pinto	University of Brazil			

== See also ==
- Guggenheim Fellowship
- List of Guggenheim Fellowships awarded in 1961
- List of Guggenheim Fellowships awarded in 1963
