= William W. Clark =

American art historian

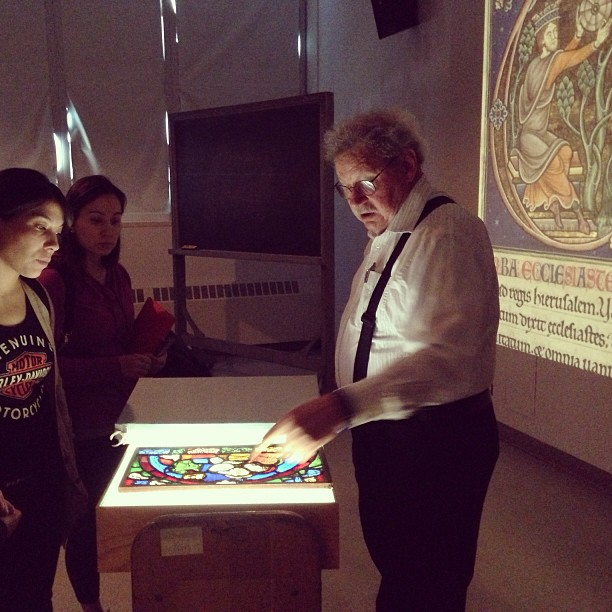
Prof. Bill Clark of CUNY-Queens College and the Graduate Center shows his undergraduate Gothic Art students a pane of stained glass from Troyes from the Godwin-Ternbach Museum collection in April 2013.

William (Bill) W. Clark (1940 – April 22, 2025) was emeritus professor of art history in the medieval studies program at the Graduate Center at Queens College, City University of New York. He was a widely published expert on early medieval, Romanesque, and Gothic art and architecture.

Clark earned his PhD in medieval art and architecture from Columbia University in 1970, under the supervision of Robert Branner. Beginning in the 1970s, he taught at Queens College. Clark wrote four books on medieval architecture. His scholarly papers have been published in major art and architecture history journals for five decades. Clark was a founding member of the Association Villard de Honnecourt for the Interdisciplinary Study of Medieval Technology, Science, and Art (AVISTA). Along with being a frequent speaker, organizer, and chairperson at conferences such as those of the College Art Association, the International Congress on Medieval Studies, the International Medieval Congress, the Medieval Academy of America, and the American Society for Eighteenth-Century Studies.

Clark appeared in the PBS series "The Art of the Western World" as an expert on Gothic architecture and art, and in the Nova series "The Master Builders" with Princeton University professor Robert Mark. He was a visiting faculty member at Southern Methodist University, for its program "Majesty, Memory, and Mourning in the Late Middle Ages."

Clark received several grants to further his research. In 1978 Clark was awarded a grant from the American Council of Learned Societies to support his post-doctoral research. He received grants from the National Endowment for the Humanities in 1995 and 2000 for his research on medieval architecture.

Bill Clark died on Tuesday, April 22, 2025.

== Selected works ==
- Clark, William W. "The Central Portal of Saint-Pierre at Lisieux: A Lost Monument of Twelfth-Century Gothic Sculpture." Gesta 11, no. 1 (1972):46–58.
- Clark, William W. "Spatial Innovations in the Chevet of Saint-Germain-des-Prés." Journal of the Society of Architectural Historians 38, no. 4 (1979):348–65.
- Clark, William W. The Architecture of Laon Cathedral. Harvey Miller Publishers, 1983. ISBN 978-0905203171
- Clark, William W., and Robert Mark. "The First Flying Buttresses: A New Reconstruction of the Nave of Notre-Dame de Paris." Art Bulletin 66, no. 1 (1984):47–65.
- Mark, Robert, and William W. Clark. "Gothic Structural Experimentation." Scientific American 251, no. 5 (1984):176–85.
- Clark, William W. "The Early Capitals of Notre-Dame de Paris." In Tribute to Lotte Brand Philip: Art Historian and Detective, edited by William W. Clark, Colin Eisler, William S. Heckscher, and Barbara G. Lane, 34–42. Abaris Books, 1985. ISBN 978-0-89835-269-6
- Clark, William W. "Suger's Church at Saint-Denis: The State of Research." In Abbot Suger and Saint-Denis: A Symposium, edited by Paula Lieber Gerson, 105–30. Harry N. Abrams, Inc., 1987.
- Radding, Charles M., and William W. Clark. Medieval Architecture, Medieval Learning: Builders and Masters in the Age of Romanesque and Gothic. Yale University Press, 1992. ISBN 978-0-300-04918-3
- Clark, William W. "Reading Reims, I: The Sculptures on the Chapel Buttresses." Gesta 39, no. 2 (2000):135–45.
- Clark, William W. "Reims Cathedral in the Portfolio of Villard de Honnecourt." In Villard's Legacy: Studies in Medieval Technology, Science and Art in Memory of Jean Gimpel, edited by Marie-Thérèse Zenner, 23–51. Routledge, 2004. ISBN 978-0-7546-0929-2
- Clark, William W. Medieval Cathedrals. Greenwood Press, 2006. ISBN 978-0-313-32693-6
- Robert Bork, William W. Clark, and Abby McGehee, eds. New Approaches to Medieval Architecture. Ashgate, 2011. ISBN 978-1409422280
- Clark, William W. "Teachers, Preachers, and the Good Shepherd at Reims Cathedral: Another Look at the Radiating Chapel Sculptures." In Arts of the Medieval Cathedrals: Studies on Architecture, Stained Glass and Sculpture in Honor of Anne Prache, edited Kathleen Nolan and Dany Sandron, 151–64. Ashgate, 2015. ISBN 978-1-4724-4055-6
- Clark, William W. "Le Christ et les anges autour des chapelles rayonnantes de la cathédrale de Reims." In La cathédrale de Reims, edited by Patrick Demouy, 341–58. Presses de l'université Paris-Sorbonne, 2017.
