= Robert Branner =

American art historian (1927–1973)

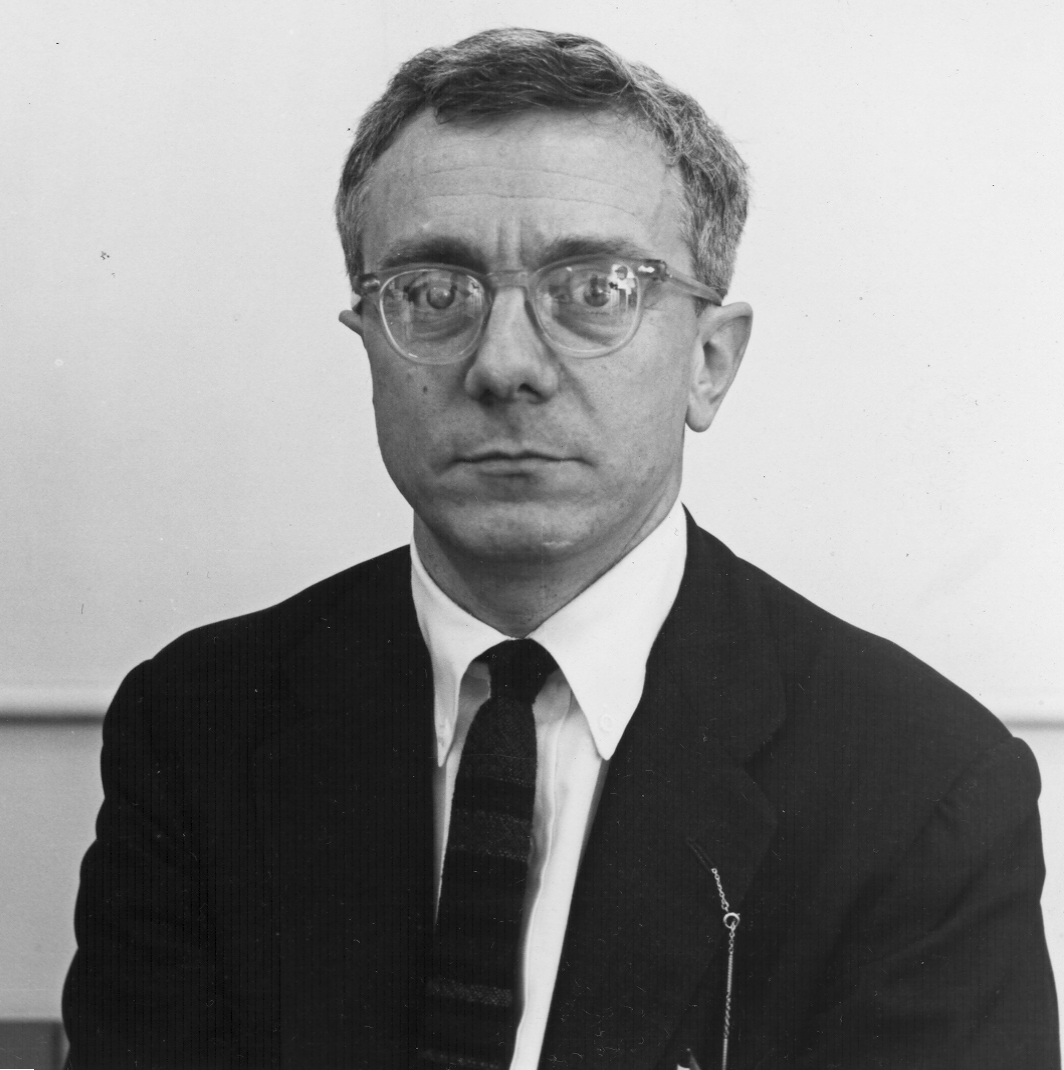
- Branner in 1968.
- Born: Robert J. Branner; January 13, 1927; New York City, U.S.
- Died: November 26, 1973 (aged 46); New York City, U.S.
- Occupations: Art historian Archaeologist; Educator
- Spouse: Shirley Prager
- Children: 1
- Parent(s): Martin Branner; Edith Fabbrini
- Awards: Guggenheim Fellowship (1962); Alice Davis Hitchcock Award (1963)

Academic background
- Education: Yale University
- Thesis: The Construction of the Chevet of Bourges Cathedral and its Place in Gothic Architecture (1963)
- Doctoral advisor: Sumner McKnight Crosby
- Influences: Jurgis Baltrušaitis; Jean Bony; Henri Focillon; Louis Grodecki

Academic work
- Discipline: Art history
- Sub-discipline: Medieval art and architecture
- Institutions: Yale University; University of Kansas; Columbia University; Johns Hopkins University
- Notable students: E. Wayne Craven; Donald Saff; William W. Clark

Robert Branner (January 13, 1927 – November 26, 1973) was an American art historian, archaeologist, and educator. A scholar of medieval art, specializing in Gothic architecture and illuminated manuscripts, Branner was Professor of Art History and Archaeology at Columbia University.

== Career ==
Born in New York City, Branner was the son of the noted cartoonist Martin Branner and Edith Fabbrini. Branner was drafted into the United States Army in 1945, serving in the later stages of the European theatre of World War II. He graduated from Yale University, where he received both a Bachelor of Arts in Classics in 1948 and a Doctor of Philosophy in Art History in 1953. He was a doctoral student of Sumner McKnight Crosby, and was also influenced by Jurgis Baltrušaitis, Jean Bony, and Louis Grodecki, all students of Henri Focillon.

While a student, Branner worked in France at the École Nationale des Chartes and led excavations of the Bourges Cathedral between 1950 and 1952, the subject of his doctoral dissertation and an eventual book on the topic that won him the Alice Davis Hitchcock Award in 1963. Throughout his career, he made important discoveries in the chronology and style of French cathedrals, incorporating cultural historical tools into the method of design analysis that had more traditionally dominated architectural history. Branner also studied such artists as Jean de Chelles, buildings such as the Le Mans Cathedral and the Sainte-Chapelle, and manuscripts such as Fécamp Bible and the Psalter of Saint Louis.

In 1952, Branner was hired to be part of the Yale faculty. He continued on to teach at the University of Kansas from 1954 to 1957, where he was Assistant Professor of Art History. He then moved on to Columbia University to become Associate Professor, winning a Guggenheim Fellowship in 1962, and reached the rank of full Professor in four years after that. After a year as department chair in 1968-1969, Branner transferred to Johns Hopkins University. He returned to Columbia shortly thereafter in 1971.

From 1964 to 1966, Branner also served as president of the Society of Architectural Historians. Late in life, he worked on the stylistic identification of different manuscript painting ateliers during the reign of Louis IX of France.

Branner died in 1973 at Mount Sinai Morningside, following complications from heart surgery. His legacy at Columbia is remembered through the Robert Branner Forum for Medieval Art, a student-run symposium. Papers from the career of Branner are kept in the Columbia University Libraries. In 2000, Gesta added several pages from his fellow students to honour Robert Branner's scholary life through his own contributions to art historical studies and his perspective on Gothic infrastructure that he noted down in his book Gothic Architecture prior to its creation at the Matthews Lecture of October 1998.

== See also ==
- List of Columbia University people
- List of Guggenheim Fellowships awarded in 1962
- List of Johns Hopkins University people
- List of people from New York City
- List of University of Kansas people
- List of Yale University people
