= Martin Branner =

American cartoonist (1888–1970)

- Martin Branner in 1939
- Born: Martin Michael Branner; December 28, 1888 Manhattan, New York City, U.S.
- Died: May 19, 1970 (aged 81) New London, Connecticut
- Areas: Cartoonist, Writer
- Notable works: Winnie Winkle
- Awards: National Cartoonists Society Humor Comic Strip Award, 1958
- Spouse: Edith Fabbrini (m. 1905; died 1966)

Martin Michael Branner (December 28, 1888 – May 19, 1970), known to his friends as Mike Branner, was a cartoonist who created the comic strip Winnie Winkle.

== Early life ==
Branner was born in Manhattan, New York City on December 28, 1888. He was a twin and one of nine children of Bernard Brenner, a Jewish immigrant lacemaker.

== Career ==
=== Vaudeville ===
In 1905, Martin Branner was an assistant to two men who booked vaudeville acts. He was a dancer who met Edith Fabbrini (1892–1966) when he was 18 and she was 15. They married a few days after they met, and the couple then entered vaudeville as a dance team. Billed as Martin and Fabbrini, they spent 15 years performing in stock, musical comedy and vaudeville on the Keith Orpheum and Pantages circuits. In Manhattan, Martin and Fabbrini played the Palace Theater the second week it opened, and they often made return engagements.

Some of Branner's earliest artwork was published during this period when he did advertising illustrations for Variety. Two shows a day sometimes increased to three and more shows daily, but bookings for the dance team became fewer during and following World War I.

=== World War I and a career transition ===
Branner served his World War I military duty with the Chemical Warfare Service of the U.S. Army.

On his return after World War I, he left vaudeville and launched a new career as a cartoonist in 1919, beginning with a short-lived strip, Looie the Lawyer, for the Bell Syndicate. He followed with a Sunday page, Pete and Pinto, which ran for 20 weeks in the New York Herald and The Sun.

=== Winnie begins ===

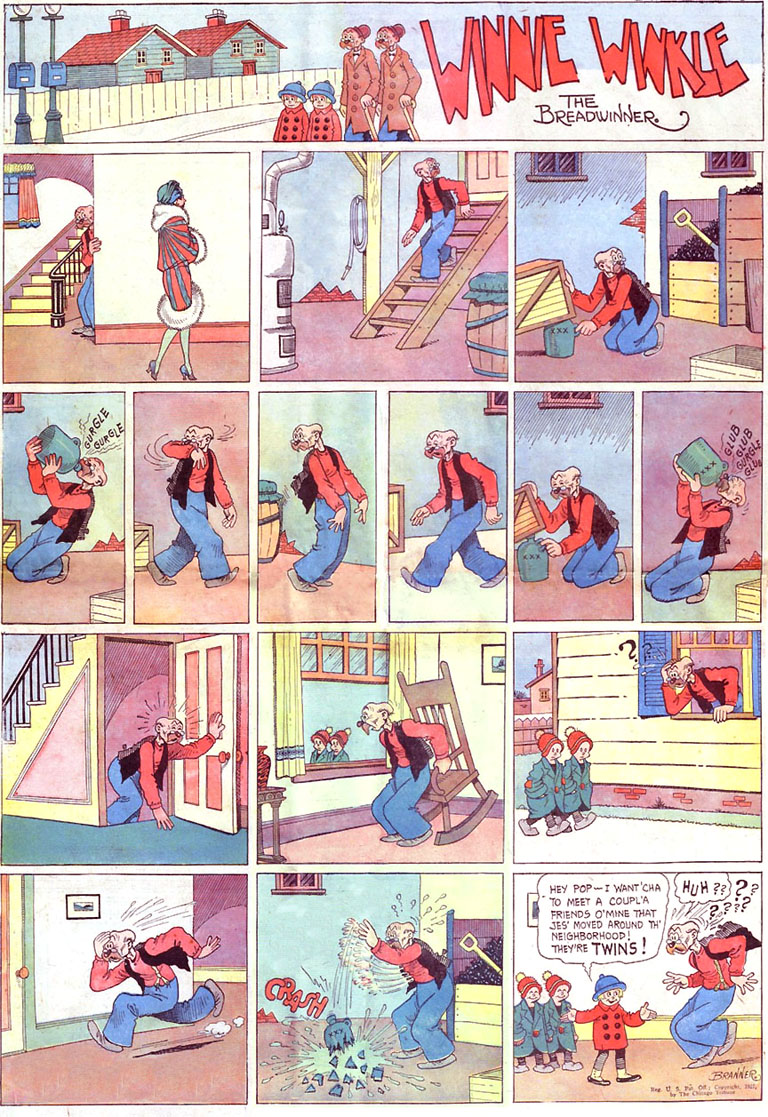
Martin Branner's Winnie Winkle (March 6, 1927)

Branner launched Winnie Winkle the Breadwinner as a daily strip in September 1920, followed by a Sunday page in 1923. Edith Branner served as the model for the character of Winnie Winkle.

Branner's 1934 to 1936 assistant was the French cartoonist Robert Velter.

By 1939, Winnie Winkle the Breadwinner was printed in 125 newspapers in America and Europe for a combined circulation of more than eight and a half million. The title was shortened to Winnie Winkle in 1943. After Velter, Branner's long-time assistant was Max Van Bibber, who took over Winnie Winkle after Branner suffered a stroke in 1962. Following the stroke, Branner began to use a wheelchair. Without the use of his right hand, he continued to draw with his left.

== Personal life ==
Branner was a noted wit and drew on his vaudeville background for some gags appearing in his cartoons.

After they retired their dance act, the Branners became the parents of Bernard Donald Branner and the art historian Robert Branner. Martin Branner converted to Roman Catholicism shortly after leaving the stage.

Martin and Edith Branner lived at 27 Riverside Drive in Waterford, Connecticut, and they were the designers of Waterford's town seal. During their many visits to Manhattan, New York City, the Branners enjoyed living in hotels; they were frequent guests at the Iroquois Hotel, which Branner called "the poor man's Algonquin." The Branner family usually spent summers boating and swimming in Connecticut.

In 1957, Branner was a guest challenger on the television panel show To Tell the Truth.

=== Death ===
Branner died at age 81 on May 19, 1970, at the Nutmeg Pavilion Convalescent Home in New London, Connecticut. He was interred at Maple Grove Cemetery in Queens, New York.

== Awards ==
Branner wrote and drew Winnie Winkle from 1920 to 1962, receiving the National Cartoonists Society Humor Comic Strip Award in 1958.

== Books ==
Winnie Winkle and the Diamond Heirlooms by Branner and Helen Berke was a 248-page hardcover novel published by Whitman in 1946.

== Archives ==
Syracuse University's Special Collections house the Martin Branner Cartoons collection of 300 original daily cartoons from Winnie Winkle (1920–1957). There is a complete week from each year represented, with additional random cartoons from each year. (There are no holdings for 1946-47.) The daily cartoons display traces of graphite, blue pencil, Zipatone, brush, pen and ink on illustration board measuring approximately 7 ¼ x 22 ½ inches.
