= Fécamp Bible =

Latin Bible

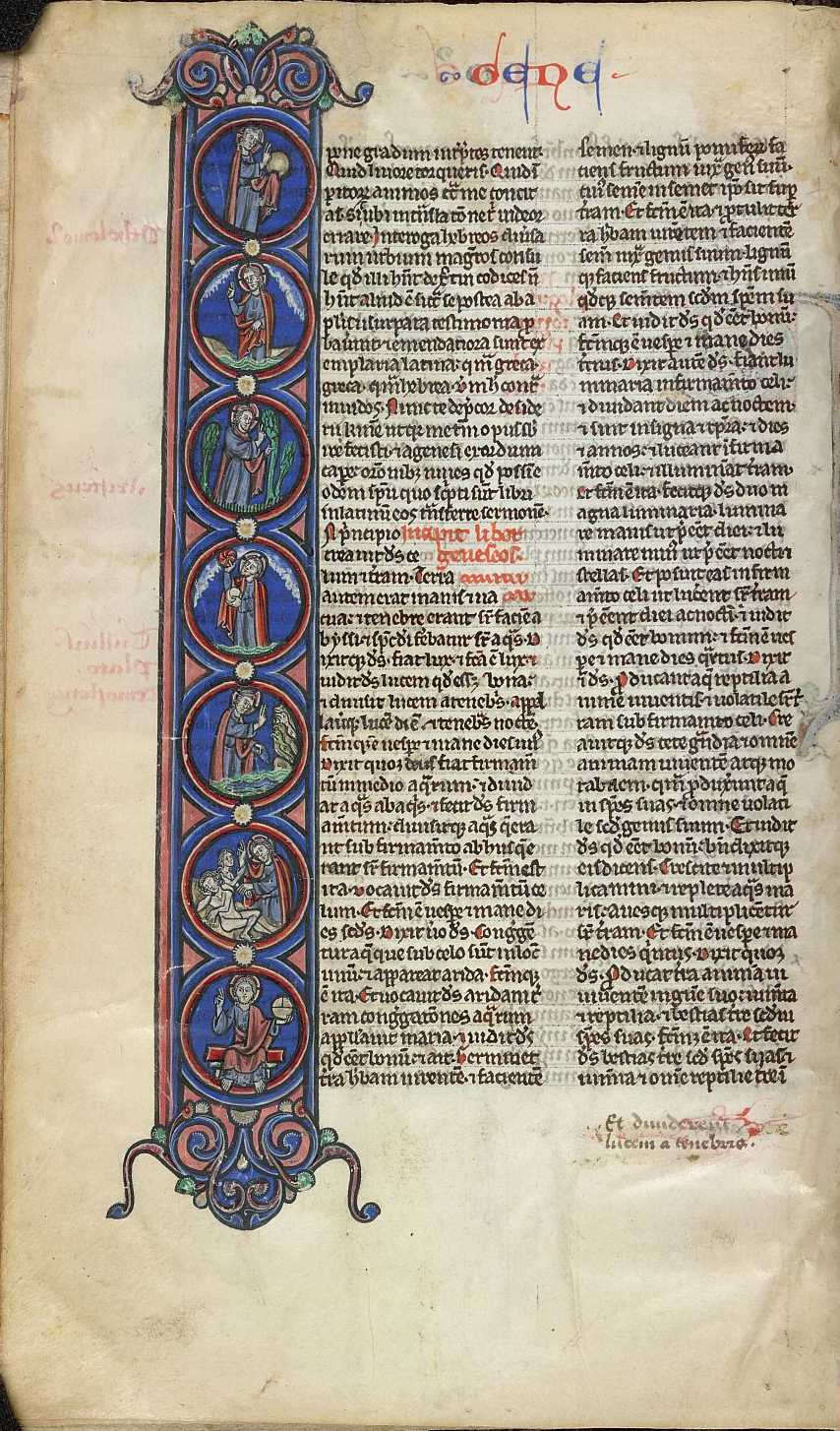
Folio 4v of the Fécamp Bible. Historiated initial "I" at the beginning of Genesis with the creation.

The Fécamp Bible (London, British Library, Yates Thompson MS 1) is an illuminated Latin Bible. It was produced in Paris during the third quarter of the 13th century, and had previously belonged in the collection of Henry Yates Thompson.

== Description ==
The codex contains the text of the Old and New Testaments, with prologues (folios 1 recto to 524 verso). The text of the Bible is followed by the "Interpretations of Hebrew Names" (folios 526 recto to 572 verso). This section contains an alphabetical list of Hebrew names found in the Bible, each accompanied by a short Latin explanation. Following the main texts, a table of Epistle and Gospel readings (folios 573 recto to 576 verso), and a litany (folios 576 verso 577 recto) were added to the manuscript. In the 13th century, a partial index of readings was added on folio ii recto.A prologue by Jerome was also added to the Epistles of Paul in the 13th century and occupies folios 577 verso to 578 recto.

The manuscript has 578 vellum folios. The folios are gathered into 26 quires, the majority of which have 24 folios per quire. Seven folios (ff. 71, 290, 299, 300, 301, 302, 303) were replaced in the 15th century. The folios measure 140 mm by 90 mm. The text is written in a Gothic script in two columns and is written in area 95 mm by 60 mm. The current binding of purple velvet, with two strap-and-pin fastenings was done in the 19th century for Yates Thompson. Before that, the previous binding consisted of original wooden boards, with remnants of a blue silk covering and two clasps.

Each book of the Bible and the major sections of Psalms is introduced by a large historiated initial in colors and gold. Exception are the books of Deuteronomy, Isaiah and Haggai. The openings to Deuteronomy and Isaiah are on folios replaced in the 15th century (folios 71 and 301). Folio 301 has large decorated initials at the beginning of the Book of Isaiah. The Book of Haggai has large 13th-century flourished initial (folio 391v). In all there 79 extant large historiated initials. The beginnings of the prologues have large zoomorphic and foliate initials. The beginning of each chapter is marked by a small initial in red with blue pen flourishes or in blue with red pen flourishes.

== Attribution of artists ==
Robert Branner has attributed the initial in the Bible to four anonymous artists. The first artist, called "A" by Branner, painted the initial for the Genesis on folio 4 verso (see illustration). This artist also painted the initial at the beginning of the Gospel of John in a manuscript now in the Vatican Library (Vat. lat. 120, f. 274). The second artist, "B", painted the initials from Exodus through the Book of Isaiah (folios 15 verso to 321 recto). This artist was related to the workshop of Pierre le Bar. The third artist, "C", painted the initials from the Book of Jeremiah through 2 Maccabees (folios 321 recto to 419 verso). This artist also painted a manuscript in the Vatican Library (Reg. lat. 16) and another in Paris (Bibliothèque nationale, lat. 16082). The final artist, "D", painted the initials in the New Testament (folios 419 verso to 572 verso). This artist was related to the Mathurin atelier.

== History of Bible ==
Based on the saints included in the litany, the manuscript was owned in the 13th century by a person associated with the Benedictine abbey of St. Taurinus, Evreux, or the Abbey of Fécamp, Normandy. An unidentified French owner in the 15th century was responsible for the replacement of the folios mentioned above, and for neat marginal annotations. Henry Yates Thompson, a British manuscript collector, bought the manuscript in 1893 from Bernard Quaritch for £30. In 1941 it was bequeathed to the British Museum by Yates Thompson's widow.
