= George R. Collins =

American art historian (1917–1993)

- Born: George Roseborough Collins; September 2, 1917; Springfield, Massachusetts, United States
- Died: January 5, 1993 (aged 75); Falmouth, Massachusetts, United States
- Occupations: Art historian Educator
- Spouse: Christiane Crasemann
- Children: 3

Academic background
- Education: Princeton University

Academic work
- Discipline: Art history
- Sub-discipline: Catalan architecture
- Institutions: Columbia University

George Roseborough Collins (September 2, 1917 – January 5, 1993) was an American art historian and educator. An expert on the work of the architect Antoni Gaudí, Collins was professor of art history at Columbia University.

== Career ==
A native of Springfield, Collins graduated from Newton High School in 1935. He received a Bachelor of Arts from Princeton University in 1939, and then continued on to earn a Master of Fine Arts in 1942. Four years later, Collins became professor of art history at Columbia University. In 1962, he was awarded a Guggenheim Fellowship. In 1986, Collins retired from teaching. He became an expert on the work of the architect Antoni Gaudí.

In 1989 and 1993, the papers of Collins were donated by his wife, Christiane Crasemann, to the Art Institute of Chicago. He would die in that year in Falmouth after battling Alzheimer's disease.

== See also ==
- List of Columbia University people
- List of Guggenheim Fellowships awarded in 1962
- List of Princeton University people
