= E. Wayne Craven =

American art historian and educator (1930–2020)

- Born: Ernest Wayne Craven, Jr. December 7, 1930; Pontiac, Illinois, U.S.
- Died: May 7, 2020 (aged 89); Newark, Delaware, U.S.
- Occupations: Art historian Educator
- Spouse: Lorna Rose Breseke (m. 1953–2020)

Academic background
- Education: Indiana University Bloomington; Columbia University
- Thesis: The Sculptures of the South Tower Base of the Cathedral of Auxerre: A Rémois Shop in Burgundy (1963)
- Doctoral advisor: Robert Branner; Otto Brendel
- Other advisors: Louis Grodecki; Willibald Sauerländer

Academic work
- Discipline: Art history
- Sub-discipline: Nineteenth-century American art
- Institutions: University of Delaware

Ernest Wayne Craven, Jr. (December 7, 1930 – May 7, 2020) was an American art historian and educator. A scholar of 19th-century American art, particularly sculpture, he was Henry Francis du Pont Winterthur Professor of Art History Emeritus at the University of Delaware.

== Life and career ==
Craven was born in Illinois to Ernest Sr. and Vera Viola Cline. He met is future wife Lorna Rose Breseke at the John Herron Art Institute and the couple married in 1953. He then received a Bachelor of Arts in 1955 and a Master of Arts in 1957 from Indiana University Bloomington. He continued his studies at Columbia University to earn a doctor of philosophy in Art History in 1963. His doctoral dissertation was on the Auxerre Cathedral and was titled "The Sculptures of the South Tower Base of the Cathedral of Auxerre: A Rémois Shop in Burgundy," supervised by Robert Branner and Otto Brendel. Louis Grodecki and Willibald Sauerländer also reviewed the text.

In 1960, while a student at Columbia, Craven was named Henry Francis du Pont Winterthur Assistant Professor of Art History at the University of Delaware, and six years later, formally began the art history department there with William Innes Homer. Craven spent the rest of his career at Delaware, rising to Henry Francis du Pont Winterthur Professor Emeritus upon retirement.

In 2008, Craven was the recipient of a Doctor of Humane Letters from the University of Delaware.

Craven died at his home in Newark, Delaware, on May 7, 2020, as a result of heart failure stemming from post COVID-19 complications. He was 89 years old.

== See also ==
- List of Columbia University alumni and attendees
- List of deaths due to COVID-19
- List of Indiana University alumni
- List of University of Delaware people
