= Lucille Shapson Hurley =

American nutritionist

Lucille Hurley (May 8, 1922 – July 28, 1988) was an American nutritionist. She held Guggenheim Fellowships in 1962 and 1969, for her work on the biochemistry of maternal and perinatal nutrition.

== Early life and education ==
Lucille Shapson Hurley was born in Riga, Latvia. She moved to Milwaukee, Wisconsin with her family in 1925. Her father, Carl Shapson, worked in a shoe factory when she was a girl. Shapson attended Wauwatosa High School, and the University of Wisconsin, where she earned a degree in nutrition in 1943. She earning a PhD in nutrition from the University of California at Berkeley in 1950. Her doctoral dissertation was titled "The relationship between pantothenic acid deficiency and adrenal cortical function." She did four years of postdoctoral training at the University of Colorado School of Medicine, focusing on biochemistry and embryology.

== Career ==
During World War II, Shapson worked for the War Food Administration as a junior nutritionist. In 1955, she became a founding professor in the Department of Nutrition at University of California at Davis, where she remained for the rest of her professional life. In 1986, her role was expanded to include a joint appointment as professor of internal medicine in the medical school at Davis.

Hurley's research concerned the biochemistry of prenatal nutrition: how dietary deficiencies could cause specific defects in the embryo, and how those deficiencies might best be prevented. For example, she was author or coauthor on over fifty published articles about how manganese is absorbed and metabolized, and over 170 papers on zinc deficiencies. Her textbook Developmental Nutrition (1980) synthesized many of her research interests. She also translated a text, Embryogenesis, originally published in German.

Hurley held Guggenheim Fellowships in 1962 and 1969. She was elected president of the Society for Environmental Geochemistry and Health in 1974, the Teratology Society in 1975, and the American Institute of Nutrition in 1984. She was editor of the Journal of Nutrition, beginning in 1984.

== Personal life ==
Lucille Shapson Hurley died following open heart surgery in 1988, age 65, in Sacramento, California, after several years of kidney disease. At the time of her death, Lucille Shapson Hurley was married to Kenneth Thompson, a fellow professor at Davis.

An annual lectureship in the Department of Nutrition at Davis is named for Lucille Hurley, as is a building in a residential court at the university.
