= Ann Steinbrocker =

American painter (1932–1982)

- Born: December 14, 1932; New York City, U.S.
- Died: April 1982 (aged 49–50)
- Awards: Guggenheim Fellowship (1962)

Ann C. Steinbrocker (December 14, 1932 – 1982) was an American painter. A 1962 Guggenheim Fellow, she appeared at the Whitney Museum of American Art's Annual Exhibition in 1961.

== Biography ==
Ann C. Steinbrocker was born on December 14, 1932, in New York City, daughter of medical doctor Otto and schoolteacher Elizabeth Steinbrocker. She was raised in Cortlandt, New York.

Steinbrocker studied art at Columbia University, The New School for Social Research, Art Students League of New York, and Boston Museum School. Among her teachers were Stuart Davis, John Heliker, Morris Kantor, Yasuo Kuniyoshi, and Julian E. Levi. In 1953, she attended Skowhegan School of Painting and Sculpture; where she and Walter H. Williams won the school's first prize for painting. She appeared at a 1956 group exhibition of drawings at the Theatre East Gallery on 211 East 60th Street.

In February 1960, Steinbrocker held a solo painting exhibition at the G Gallery at 200 East 59th Street; The New York Times reported that they were "complex, animated figure paintings with social realist overtones." In April 1960, the National Institute of Arts and Letters awarded her the first Rosenthal Award in painting; she was reported at the time to be "a young painter of great distinction who has not yet had due recognition".

In May 1960, Steinbrocker was awarded the Richard and Hilda Rosenthal Foundation Award for her oil paintings; Stuart Preston called them "restlessly expressive oils" and said that "judgment must be suspended [on her] for the time being". Her piece Woman appeared at the 1961 Whitney Museum of American Art Annual Exhibition; John Canaday of The New York Times described it as "chilled by ambiguous premonitions". In December 1961, Steinbrocker invited Robert Indiana to a Christmas party. In 1962, she was awarded a Guggenheim Fellowship for painting.

Steinbrocker died in April 1982.
