= William Innes Homer =

American art historian

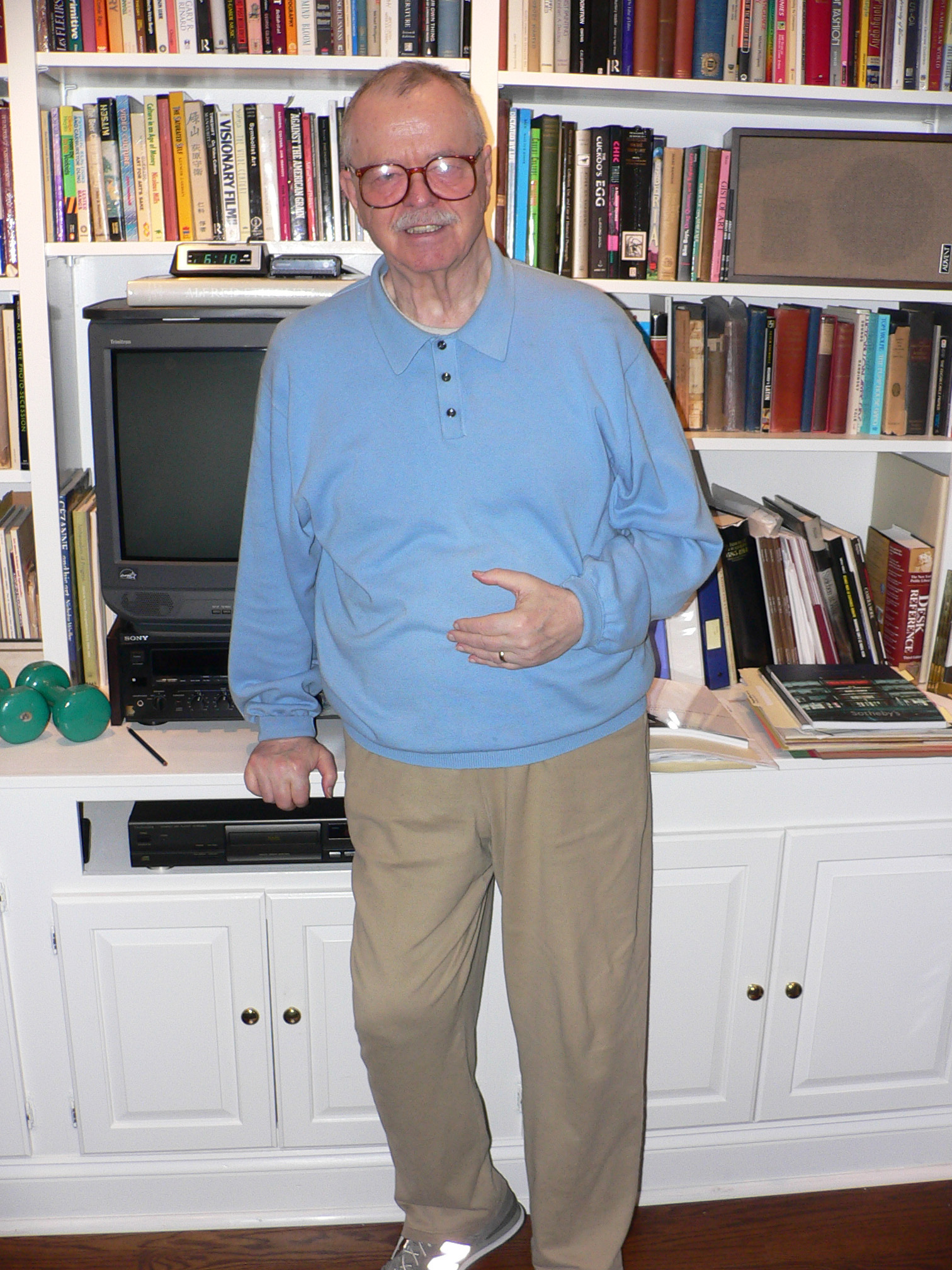
William Innes Homer (2010)

William Innes Homer (November 8, 1929 – July 8, 2012) was an American academic, art historian, and author. Homer was an expert in the life and works of painter Thomas Eakins.

== Academic career ==
Homer received his B.A. from Princeton University in 1951. From Harvard University, Homer received his M.A. in 1954 and his Ph.D. in 1961. In 1961, Homer was hired as an assistant professor in the Art and Archaeology Department at Princeton. In 1964, he became an associate professor of Art History at Cornell University. In 1966, Homer came to the University of Delaware where he served as Chairman of the Art History Department from 1966 until 1981 and again from 1986 until 1993. He established the department alongside E. Wayne Craven. Homer retired from the department in January 2000 and was awarded a professor emeritus position with the university.

Homer authored numerous books and articles, including Alfred Stieglitz and the American Avant-Garde, Albert Pinkham Ryder: Painter of Dreams, Thomas Eakins: His Life and Art, and The Paris Letters of Thomas Eakins. He also served as a consultant for various exhibitions and film projects.

Homer died on July 8, 2012.
