= Eric Reissner =

German-American mathematician

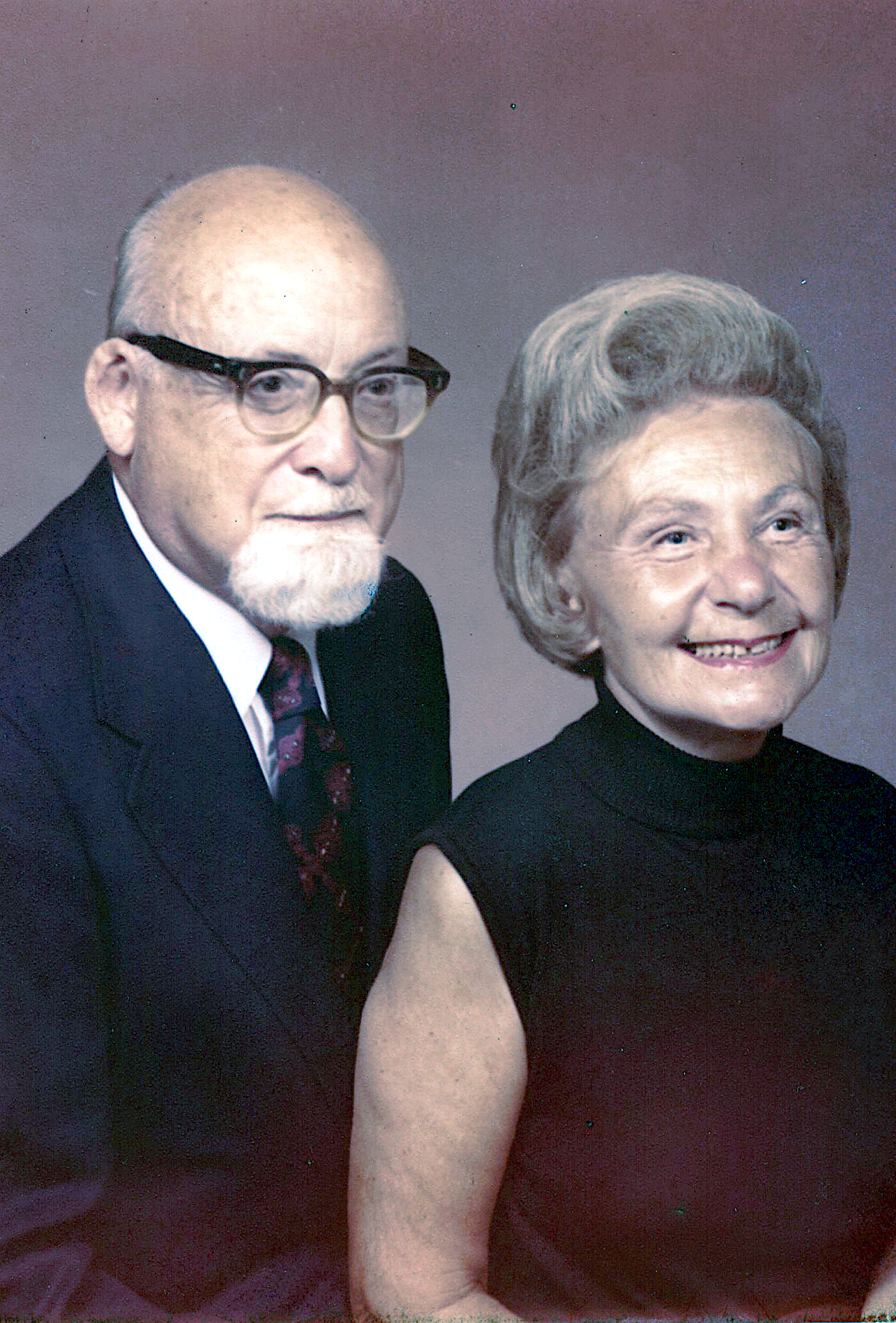
- Eric and Johanna Reissner
- Born: January 5, 1913
- Died: November 1, 1996 (aged 83)
- Known for: Reissner–Stein static theory Mindlin–Reissner plate theory
- Awards: ASME Medal (1988); Timoshenko Medal (1973); Theodore von Karman Medal (1964); Guggenheim Fellowship (1962); ICM Speaker (1936)
- Scientific career
- Fields: civil engineering, mathematics
- Thesis: Contributions to the Theory of Elasticity of Non-Isotropic Materials (1938)
- Doctoral advisors: Dirk Jan Struik
- Doctoral students: Douglas McIlroy

Max Erich (Eric) Reissner (January 5, 1913 – November 1, 1996) was a German-American civil engineer and mathematician, and Professor of Mathematics at the Massachusetts Institute of Technology. He was recipient of the Theodore von Karman Medal in 1964, and the ASME Medal in 1988.

Reissner is known as co-developer of the Mindlin–Reissner plate theory. He is remembered by The New York Times (1996) as the "mathematician whose work in applied mechanics helped broaden the theoretical understanding of how solid objects react under stress and led to advances in both civil and aerospace engineering."

== Biography ==
Reissner was born in Aachen, Germany, son of Hans Jacob Reissner, an aeronautical engineer, and Josefine (Reichenberger) Reissner. At the Technische Hochschule Berlin-Charlottenburg he obtained dregrees in Applied Mathematics in 1935, and in Civil Engineering in 1936. Next he obtained his PhD at the Massachusetts Institute of Technology in 1938 under Dirk Struik with the thesis, entitled "Contributions to the Theory of Elasticity of Non-Isotropic Materials."

Reissner started his academic career in 1938 at the Massachusetts Institute of Technology, where he taught mathematics. In 1947 he was appointed Professor of Mathematics, and served in this position until 1969. Next from 1969 to 1979 he was Professor of Applied Mechanics and Engineering Sciences at the University of California, San Diego. From 1948 to 1955 he had also been researcher at NASA's Langley Research Center, and from 1956 to 1957 at Lockheed's Palo Alto Research Center.

Reissner was awarded a Guggenheim Fellowship in 1962. He was awarded the honorary doctor by the University of Hanover, and was elected honorary member by the Society for Applied Mathematics and Mechanics (GAMM). He received the Timoshenko Medal in 1973, the Theodore von Karman Medal in 1964, and of the ASME Medal in 1988.

== Selected publications ==
- William Ted Martin and Eric Reissner. Elementary differential equations. Addison-Wesley Publishing Company, 1956; 1961.
- Eric Reissner. Selected Works in Applied Mechanics and Mathematics. 1996.

Articles, a selection

- E. Reissner, "The Effect of Transverse Shear Deformation on the Bending of Elastic Plates," ASME Journal of Applied Mechanics, Vol. 12, 1945, pp. A68–A77
- Reissner, Eric. "On bending of elastic plates." Quarterly of Applied Mathematics 5.1 (1947): 55–68.
- Reissner, Eric. "On a variational theorem in elasticity." Studies in Applied Mathematics 29.1–4 (1950): 90–95.
- Lin C. C., Reissner E., Tsien H. S. ″On two-dimensional non steady motion of a slender body in a compressible fluid″ // J. Math. and Phus. 1948. V. 27, No 3
