= UNESCO statements on race =

UNESCO statements about issues of race

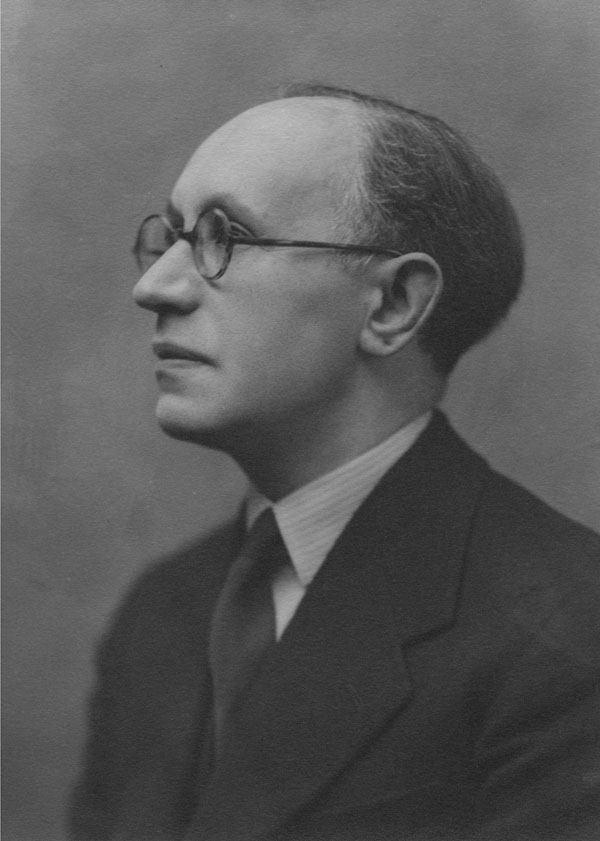
Morris Ginsberg

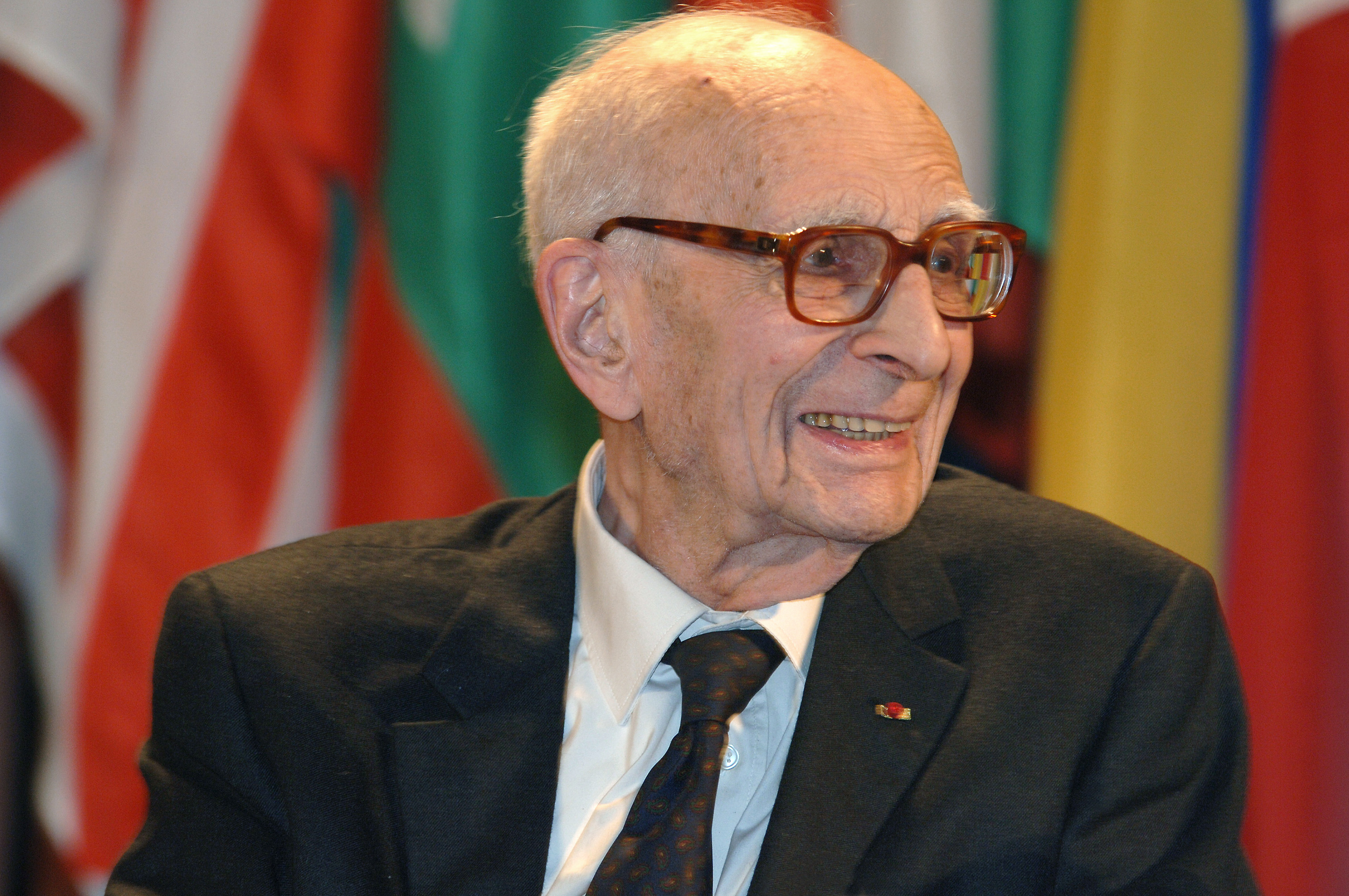
Claude Levi-Strauss

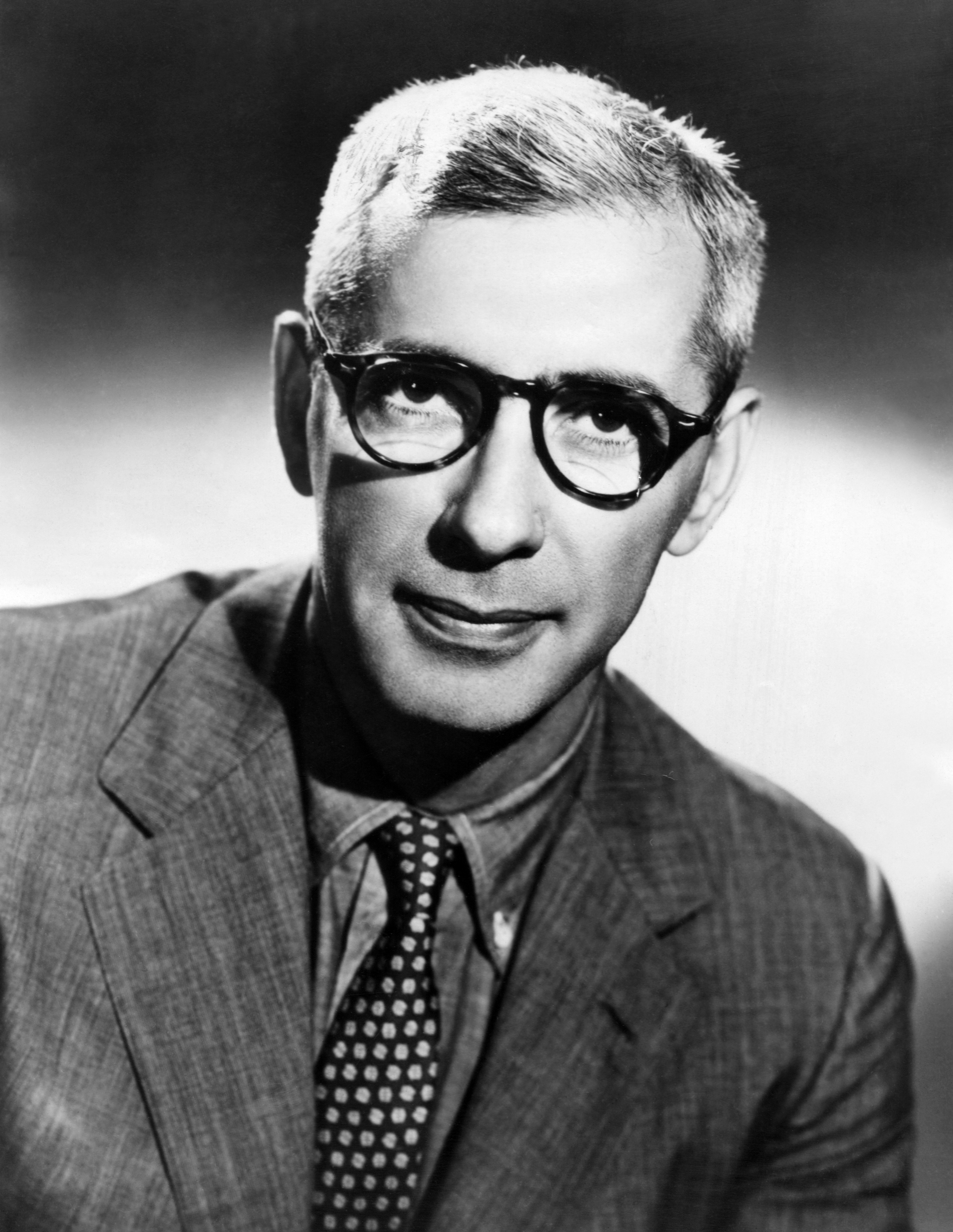
Ashley Montagu

UNESCO has published several statements about issues of race.

The statements include:

- Statement on race (Paris, July 1950)
- Statement on the nature of race and race differences (Paris, June 1951)
- Proposals on the biological aspects of race (Moscow, August 1964)
- Statement on race and racial prejudice (Paris, September 1967)

Other statements include the Declaration on the Elimination of All Forms of Racial Discrimination (1963), the "Declaration on Race and Racial Prejudice" (1978) and the "Declaration of Principles on Tolerance" (1995).

== Statement on race (1950) ==
Statement on race is the first statement on race issued by UNESCO. It was issued on 18 July 1950 following World War II and Nazi racism, to clarify what was scientifically known about race, and as a moral condemnation of racism.

Coordinated by Swiss anthropologist Alfred Metraux, it was drafted by Ernest Beaglehole, psychologist and ethnologist; Juan Comas, anthropologist; Luiz de Aguiar Costa Pinto, sociologist; Franklin Frazier, sociologist specialised in race relations studies; Morris Ginsberg, founding chairperson of the British Sociological Association; Humayun Kabir, writer, philosopher, and twice Education Minister of India; Claude Lévi-Strauss, one of the founders of ethnology and leading theorist of structural anthropology; and Ashley Montagu, anthropologist and author of The Elephant Man: A Study in Human Dignity, who was the rapporteur.

The statement was criticized on several grounds, in particular by natural scientists. Criticisms were submitted by Hadley Cantril; Edwin Conklin; Gunnar Dahlberg; Theodosius Dobzhansky, author of Genetics and the Origin of Species (1937); L. C. Dunn; Donald J. Hager, professor of anthropology and sociology at the University of Princeton; Julian Huxley, first director of UNESCO and one of the many key contributors to modern evolutionary synthesis; Otto Klineberg; Wilbert Moore; H. J. Muller; Gunnar Myrdal, author of An American Dilemma: The Negro Problem and Modern Democracy (1944); Joseph Needham, a biochemist specialist of Chinese science; and geneticist Curt Stern. The text was then revised by Ashley Montagu and the revised statement was published in 1951, as well as a book detailing the criticisms in 1952.

UNESCO would start a campaign to spread the results of the report to a "vast public" such as by publishing pamphlets. It described Brazil as having an "exemplary situation" regarding race relations and that research should be undertaken in order to understand the causes of this "harmony".

=== Contents ===
The introduction states that it was inevitable that UNESCO should take a position in the controversy. The preamble to the UNESCO constitution states that it should combat racism. The constitution itself stated that "The great and terrible war that has now ended was a war made possible by the denial of the democratic principles of the dignity, equality and mutual respect of men, and by the propagation, in their place, through ignorance and prejudice, of the doctrine of the inequality of men and races."

A 1948 UN Social and Economic Council resolution called upon UNESCO to consider the timeliness "of proposing and recommending the general adoption of a programme of dissemination of scientific facts designed to bring about the disappearance of that which is commonly called race prejudice." In 1949, the General Conference of UNESCO adopted three resolutions which committed it to "study and collect scientific materials concerning questions of race", "to give wide diffusion to the scientific material collected", and "to prepare an education campaign based on this information."

Furthermore, in doing this

UNESCO took up again, after a lapse of fifteen years, a project which the International Institute for Intellectual Co-operation has wished to carry through but which it had to abandon in deference to the appeasement policy of the pre-war period. The race question had become one of the pivots of Nazi ideology and policy. Masaryk and Beneš took the initiative of calling for a conference to re-establish in the minds and consciences of men everywhere the truth about race... But they were not given such an opportunity. Nazi propaganda was able to continue its baleful work unopposed by the authority of an international organisation.

The introduction stated "Knowledge of the truth does not always help change emotional attitudes that draw their real strength from the subconscious or from factors beside the real issue." But it could "however, prevent rationalizations of reprehensive acts or behaviour prompted by feelings that men will not easily avow openly."

UNESCO made a moral statement:

Concern for human dignity demands that all citizens be equal before the law, and that they share equally in the advantages assured them by the law, no matter what their physical or intellectual differences may be. The law sees in each person only a human being who has the right to the same consideration and to equal respect. The conscience of all mankind demand that this be true for all the peoples of the earth. It matters little, therefore, whether the diversity of men's gift be the result of biological or cultural factors.

The statement argued that there was no evidence for intellectual or personality differences.

The statement did not reject the idea of a biological basis to racial categories. It defined the concept of race in terms of a population defined by certain anatomical and physiological characteristics diverging from other populations; it gives as examples the Caucasian, Mongoloid, and Negroid races. However, the statement argued that "National, religious, geographic, linguistic and cultural groups do not necessarily coincide with racial groups: and the cultural traits of such groups have no demonstrated genetic connection with racial traits. Because serious errors of this kind are habitually committed when the term 'race' is used in popular parlance, it would be better when speaking of human races to drop the term 'race' altogether and speak of ethnic groups."

== Statement on the nature of race and race differences (1951) ==
Despite the introduction to the 1950 statement declaring "The competence and objectivity of the scientists who signed the document in its final form cannot be questioned", the first version of the statement was heavily criticized.

L.C. Dunn, the rapporteur for the 1951 statement, explained the controversy as "At the first discussion on the problem of race, it was chiefly sociologists who gave their opinions and framed the 'Statement on Race'. That statement had a good effect, but it did not carry the authority of just those groups within whose special province fall the biological problems of race, namely the physical anthropologists and geneticists. Secondly, the first statement did not, in all its details, carry conviction of these groups and, because of this, it was not supported by many authorities in these two fields. In general, the chief conclusions of the first statement were sustained, but with differences in emphasis and with some important omissions."

The 1951 statement declared that Homo sapiens is one species.

The authors of the 1951 statement "agreed to reserve race as the word to be used" for "groups of mankind possessing well-developed and primarily heritable physical differences from other groups."

"The concept of race is unanimously regarded by anthropologists as a classificatory device providing a zoological frame within which the various groups of mankind may be arranged and by means of which studies of evolutionary processes can be facilitated. In its anthropological sense, the word 'race' should be reserved for groups of mankind possessing well-developed and primarily heritable physical differences from other groups." These differences have been caused in part by partial isolation preventing intermingling, geography an important explanation for the major races, often cultural for the minor races. National, religious, geographical, linguistic and cultural groups do not necessarily coincide with racial groups.

The statement declared "There is no evidence for the existence of so-called 'pure races'" and "no biological justification for prohibiting inter- marriage between persons of different races."

== The Race Concept (1952) ==
In 1952, UNESCO published a follow-up book, The Race Concept: Results of an Inquiry, containing the 1951 statement, followed by comments and criticisms from many of the scientists engaged in the drafting and review of the text.

Four scientists are listed as "frankly opposed" to the statement as a whole: C. D. Darlington, Ronald Fisher, Giuseppe E. Genna of the University of Florence, and Carleton S. Coon. Among these, English statistician and biologist Fisher insisted on racial differences, arguing that evidence and everyday experience showed that human groups differ profoundly "in their innate capacity for intellectual and emotional development" and concluded that the "practical international problem is that of learning to share the resources of this planet amicably with persons of materially different nature", and that "this problem is being obscured by entirely well-intentioned efforts to minimize the real differences that exist."

The book stated that "When intelligence tests, even non-verbal, are made on a group of non-literate people, their scores are usually lower than those of more civilised people" but concluded that "Available scientific knowledge provides no basis for believing that the groups of mankind differ in their innate capacity for intellectual and emotional development."

== Statement on race and racial prejudice (1967) ==
According to Michael Banton, "The 1950 statement appeared to assume that once the erroneous nature of racist doctrines had been exposed, the structure of racial prejudice and discrimination would collapse. The eminent scholars who composed the document did not consider explicitly the other sources of racial hostility." Therefore, in 1967 a fourth panel of experts was assembled for one week to discuss social, ethical and philosophical aspects of race.

== Declaration on Race and Racial Prejudice (1978) ==
In 1978, the Declaration on Race and Racial Prejudice was adopted by the General Conference of UNESCO, a political body consisting of representatives of member states. This declaration stated that "All peoples of the world possess equal faculties for attaining the highest level in intellectual, technical, social, economic, cultural and political development" and "The differences between the achievements of the different peoples are entirely attributable to geographical, historical, political, economic, social and cultural factors." It also argued for implementing a number of policies in order to combat racism and inequalities, and stated that "Population groups of foreign origin, particularly migrant workers and their families who contribute to the development of the host country, should benefit from appropriate measures designed to afford them security and respect for their dignity and cultural values and to facilitate their adaptation to the host environment and their professional advancement with a view to their subsequent reintegration in their country of origin and their contribution to its development; steps should be taken to make it possible for their children to be taught their mother tongue."

A draft of the statement was prepared by the Director-General and "eminent specialists in human rights". It was discussed at a meeting by government representatives from over 100 member states. It was recommended that the representatives should include among them "social scientists and other persons particularly qualified to in the social, political, economic, cultural, and scientific aspects of the problem". A number of non-governmental and inter-governmental organizations sent observers. A final text of was adopted by the meeting of government representatives "by consensus, without opposition or vote" and later by the UNESCO General Conference, Twentieth Session.

== Declaration of Principles on Tolerance (1995) ==
In 1995, UNESCO published a Declaration of Principles on Tolerance to add to its dialogue about racial equality with recommendations for tolerant treatment of persons with varied racial and cultural backgrounds. It stated "Tolerance is respect, acceptance and appreciation of the rich diversity of our world's cultures, our forms of expression and ways of being human. It is fostered by knowledge, openness, communication, and freedom of thought, conscience and belief. Tolerance is harmony in difference. It is not only a moral duty, it is also a political and legal requirement. Tolerance, the virtue that makes peace possible, contributes to the replacement of the culture of war by a culture of peace."

== Legacy ==
The 1950 UNESCO statement contributed to the 1954 U.S. Supreme Court desegregation decision in Brown v. Board of Education of Topeka.

== See also ==
- Convention on the Protection and Promotion of the Diversity of Cultural Expressions
- International Convention on the Elimination of All Forms of Racial Discrimination
- International Day for Tolerance
- Nazism and race
- Racial Equality Proposal
- Seville Statement on Violence
- World Conference against Racism
