= Carol MacClintock =

American musicologist (1910–1989)

- Born: November 19, 1910; St. Joseph, Missouri, U.S.
- Died: January 3, 1989 (aged 78); Bloomington, Indiana, U.S.
- Occupations: Musicologist; editor; classical singer
- Awards: Guggenheim Fellowship (1962)

Academic background
- Education: University of Chicago; University of Illinois Urbana-Champaign; University of Kansas; American Conservatory; Juilliard School; Indiana University School of Music
- Thesis: The Five-Part Madrigals of Giaches de Wert (1955)
- Doctoral advisor: Willi Apel

Academic work
- Discipline: Musicology
- Sub-discipline: Italian renaissance music
- Institutions: Colorado Women's College; Stephens College; University of Illinois Urbana-Champaign; Indiana University School of Music; Southern Illinois University; University of Cincinnati – College-Conservatory of Music

Mildred Carol Cook MacClintock (née Cook; November 19, 1910 – January 3, 1989) was an American musicologist and editor. Originally a soprano singer trained at Juilliard School, she had a decades-long career as a music professor, including at the Indiana University School of Music, Southern Illinois University, University of Cincinnati – College-Conservatory of Music. A 1962 Guggenheim Fellow, she published edited collections of Italian renaissance music, including the work of Flemish composer Giaches de Wert, and she published in musicology and was a widely-known expert in de Wert.

== Biography ==
=== Early life ===
Mildred Carol Cook was born on November 19, 1910, in St. Joseph, Missouri, daughter of Ernest Farnham Cook. Originally studying music, she studied at the University of Chicago (1928–1930), before obtaining her BMus at the University of Illinois Urbana-Champaign in 1932 and her MMus at the University of Kansas in 1935. She also spent some time abroad studying music, including at the American Conservatory, as well as at Juilliard School. Among her piano teachers were Coenraad V. Bos, Robert Casadesus, and Camille Decreus, and Lucien Muratore taught her in singing.

She originally had a career as a classical singer, particularly as a soprano, and she performed at concerts at the premises of Southern Illinois University. She also presented song recitals at SIU.

=== Teaching career ===
She worked as a professor of music at Colorado Women's College (1936–1940) and Stephens College (1940–1941), before working as a music instructor at the University of Illinois (1941–1944) and, beginning in 1944, Indiana University Bloomington, particularly at the School of Music. She was promoted to assistant professor in 1946, before moving to Southern Illinois University in 1959, where she became associate professor of music.

In 1964, she moved to the University of Cincinnati – College-Conservatory of Music as associate professor of music, where she also worked as the director of UC's Collegium Museum. Other activities she assisted in at UC included the inception of their music doctoral program. She was a visiting professor at the Stanford University Department of Music during the 1968–1969 academic year, and she also returned to IU sometimes as a lecturer. She was also a member of Sigma Alpha Iota. In 1976, she retired from UC and became professor emeritus.

=== Musicological and editing career ===
She obtained her PhD in musicology from Indiana University School of Music in 1955; her doctoral dissertation, The Five-Part Madrigals of Giaches de Wert, was supervised by Willi Apel. In 1962, she was appointed a Guggenheim Fellow to do research on Giaches de Wert, which she did as part of a research trip in Europe. In 1966, she published Giaches de Wert (1535-1596), Life and Works, a monograph on de Wert. By 1976, she was widely known as an expert on de Wert. In 1979, she published Readings in the History of Music in Performance, an edited collection on the history of musical performance.

In 1959, she edited Musica Liturgica's version of Paolo Isnardi's Missa Angelus Domini. She and Melvin Bernstein co-edited seventeen volumes featuring Giaches de Wert music from 1961 to 1977. In 1965, she edited The Bottegari Lutebook, the Wellesley Edition's eighth volume, featuring Italian renaissance music, particularly from Cosimo Bottegari. She transcribed De Wert's music for Music from the Court of Mantua, a classical album released from Vanguard Records. In 1970, one sheet music collection she edited was published by Karl Heinrich Möseler Verlag. In 1973, she published an edited collection of solo music called The Solo Song: 1580-1730.

She transcribed and edited Daniel Purcell's score of The Judgment of Paris, which she had originally discovered during a visit to the British Museum, for that work's first performance since 1701; reportedly one of the first in English, it occurred at UC's Patricia Corbett Theater on May 20, 1973.

=== Personal life and death ===
On March 18, 1945, she married Lander MacClintock, a French professor at Indiana University Bloomington. Her husband died on February 16, 1980, while MacClintock herself died on January 3, 1989 in Bloomington, Indiana.

== Bibliography ==
- (ed.) The Bottegari Lutebook (1965)
- Giaches de Wert (1535-1596), Life and Works (1966)
- (ed.) Vier Madrigale und drei Kanzonetten (1970; by Giaches de Wert)
- (ed.) The Solo Song: 1580-1730 (1973)
- (ed.) Readings in the History of Music in Performance (1979)
