= William Riley Parker =

William Riley Parker (August 7, 1906 – October 28, 1968) was an American scholar noted for his works on John Milton.

== Early life and academic career ==
He was born in Roanoke, Virginia to Dr Frank Parker and Bertha Ladow Parker (née Riley). He was educated at Roanoke College and Princeton University, where he was awarded an MA. Parker was then appointed instructor in English at Northwestern University. He studied for his B.Litt. at Oxford University, where he analysed the influence of Greek tragedy on John Milton's Samson Agonistes.

Parker returned to the United States and worked for Ohio State University. In 1937 his B.Litt. thesis was published as Milton's Debt to Greek Tragedy in Samson Agonistes. In 1938 Clarendon Press commissioned Parker to write a biography of John Milton, which was published in two volumes in 1968.

In 1946 Parker became secretary of the Modern Language Association and for ten years he edited its journal. During this time he was also professor at New York University and in 1956 was appointed professor of English at Indiana University. In 1958 he was promoted to distinguished service professor of English at Indiana and in 1966 he became chairman of the English department.

== Personal life ==
In 1932 Parker married Mary Ann Blakesley and they had a son and a daughter.

== Works ==
=== Books ===
- Milton's Debt to Greek Tragedy in Samson Agonistes (Johns Hopkins Press, 1937).
- Milton's Contemporary Reputation (Columbus: The Ohio State University Press, 1940).
- Milton: A Biography, two volumes (Oxford: Clarendon Press, 1968).

=== Articles ===
- 'Milton's Last Sonnet', The Review of English Studies, Vol. 21, No. 83 (July 1945), pp. 235–238.
- 'Milton's Last Sonnet Again', The Review of English Studies, Vol. 2, No. 6 (April 1951), pp. 147–154.
- 'Who Wouldn't Have Thought?', CEA Critic, Vol. 14, No. 2 (February 1952), p. 2.
- 'What Next?', PMLA, Vol. 68, No. 1 (March 1953), pp. 43–48.
- 'Milton and the News of Charles Diodati's Death', Modern Language Notes, Vol. 72, No. 7 (November 1957), pp. 486–488.
- 'Afterthoughts on a Profession: Graduate Training in the Humanities Today', College English, Vol. 19, No. 5 (February 1958), pp. 191–199.
- 'Wood's Life of Milton: Its Sources and Significance', The Papers of the Bibliographical Society of America, Vol. 52, No. 1 (First Quarter, 1958), pp. 1-22.
- 'The Profession and George', PMLA, Vol. 75, No. 1 (March 1960), pp. 1–7.
- 'Notes on the Text of "Samson Agonistes"', The Journal of English and Germanic Philology, Vol. 60, No. 4, Milton Studies in Honor of Harris Francis Fletcher (October 1961), pp. 688–698.
- 'Report of the Delegate to the American Council of Learned Societies', PMLA, Vol. 77, No. 2 (May 1962), pp. 74–75.
- 'Education: Milton's Ideas and Ours', College English, Vol. 24, No. 1 (October 1962), pp. 1–14.
- 'The Case for Latin', PMLA, Vol. 79, No. 4, Part 2: Supplement (September 1964), pp. 3–10.
- 'The Case for Latin', The Classical Journal, Vol. 60, No. 1 (October 1964), pp. 1–10.
- 'The Case for Latin', Hispania, Vol. 47, No. 4 (December 1964), pp. 774–781.
- 'Where Do English Departments Come from?', College English, Vol. 28, No. 5 (February 1967), pp. 339–351.
- 'Milton's Commonplace Book: An Index and Notes', co-authored with John T. Shawcross, Milton Newsletter, Vol. 3, No. 3 (October 1969), pp. 41–54.
- 'Problems in Milton Biography', Milton Quarterly, Vol. 5, No. 4 (December 1971), pp. 66–71.
