= Louis Grodecki =

French art historian

Louis Grodecki (18 July 1910, Warsaw – 28 March 1982, Paris) was a French art historian. A disciple of Henri Focillon since 1929, shortly after his arrival in France, and naturalized French in 1935, he met art historian Erwin Panofsky in 1949 at the Institute for Advanced Study in Princeton. Grodecki is famous for his work on romanesque stained glass, of Paris, Picardy and the Nord-Pas de Calais region. His most notable works are about the stained glasses of Chartres Cathedral, in particular a complete catalogue which he never finished. He was a reviewer for the doctoral dissertation of E. Wayne Craven.

== Bibliography ==
- Au Seuil de l'Art Roman. L'architecture Ottonienne, Paris 1958. Armand Colin ISBN 2264067969
- Le Maître de saint Eustache de la cathédrale de Chartres et Les problèmes de la peinture gothique et le Maître de saint Chéron de la cathédrale de Chartres, articles republiées dans Le Moen Âge retrouvé, vol. 2, Flammarion, Paris, 1990
- Le Vitrail Gothique du XIIIe siècle, Louis Grodecki et C. Brisac, Office du Livre, Fribourg, 1984ISBN 2719102148
- Le Siècle de l'An Mil (L'Univers des Formes) (French Edition), Gallimard, 1973 ISBN 207010785X
- Ivoires français, etc., Paris, Larousse (1 Jan. 1947) ASIN : B00LI0DRZ6
- Le Vitrail Roman, Grodecki, C. Brisac et C. Lautier, Edition Vilo (1 Jan. 1977) ISBN 2719100471
- Norway : Paintings from the Stave churches, Preface R. Hauglid. Introduction L. Grodecki. Published by the New York graphic society by arrangement with Unesco,1955.
- Bibliographie Henri Focillon, Yale University Press, 1963
- Pierrefonds / par Louis Grodecki .Paris: Caisse Nationale des Monuments Historiques et des Sites, 1979. Nouvelle éd
- Le Moyen Âge retrouvé : De l'an mil à l'an 1200. (Idées et recherches).1986, Paris, Flammarion.ISBN 2080126075
- Les Vitraux de Notre-Dame de Paris, L. Grodecki, C. Brisac, J. Le Chevallier, Paris 1982, Nouvelles éditions latines.ISBN 2723301362
- Gothic Stained Glass : 1200-1300 / L. Grodecki and C.Brisac. London: Thames and Hudson, 1985.ISBN 0500234299
- Gothic architecture / L. Grodecki; contributions by Anne Prache and Roland Recht.London : Faber, 1986, c1978.ISBN 0571145159
- Etudes sur les vitraux de Suger à Saint-Denis (XIIe siècle) / Préface d'Anne Prache; ʹEdité par Catherine Grodecki avec la collaboration de Chantal Bouchon et Yolanta Załuska. Paris: Presses de l'Université de Paris-Sorbonne, 1995. ISBN 284050037X

== Other information ==
Photographs contributed by Louis Grodecki to the Conway Library are currently being digitised by the Courtauld Institute of Art, as part of the Courtauld Connects project.
