= Miriam Kosh Starkman =

American historian (1916-2000)

- Born: May 31, 1916; Płock, Government General of Warsaw, German Empire
- Died: April 12, 2000 (aged 83)
- Occupation: Literary scholar
- Spouse: Philip J. Starkman
- Awards: Guggenheim Fellow (1962)

Academic background
- Education: Brooklyn College; Columbia University
- Thesis: Swift's satire on learning in A Tale of a Tub (1950)

Academic work
- Sub-discipline: Jonathan Swift
- Institutions: Queens College

Miriam Kosh Starkman (May 31, 1916 – April 12, 2000) was an American literary scholar. A professor at Queens College and 1962 Guggenheim Fellow, she published the book Swift's Satire on Learning (1950) and the edited volumes Gulliver's Travels and Other Writings of Jonathan Swift (1962) and Seventeenth-Century English Poetry (1967).

== Biography ==
Miriam Kosh Starkman was born on May 31, 1916, in Płock, a Polish city at the time occupied by the German Empire, daughter of Deborah (née Halperin) and Abraham M. Kosh, and emigrated to the United States in 1922. She obtained her BA from Brooklyn College in 1935), as well as her MA and PhD from Columbia University. (Note: Contemporary Authors says they were given at 1939 and 1947 respectively, while a contemporary edition of Reports of the President and the Treasurer says 1940 and 1950.) Her doctoral dissertation was titled Swift's satire on learning in A Tale of a Tub.

In 1944, she moved to Queens College in a teaching position, and was promoted from instructor to assistant professor in the 1950s, before being promoted to associate professor in the early 1960s. (Note: While Contemporary Authors says that she started as an instructor and that she was promoted to assistant professor and associate professor in 1954 and 1961, a contemporary edition of Reports of the President and the Treasurer says that she started as a tutor and that the promotions occurred happened in 1956 and 1960.) In 1965, she was promoted to full professor.

She was a Ford Foundation Fellow in the 1950s. (Note: Contemporary Authors says 1956-1957, while a contemporary edition of Reports of the President and the Treasurer says 1954-1955.) She was a 1962-1963 Fulbright Scholar at Tel Aviv University. She also had visiting professor positions at Columbia (1957-1958), University of Wisconsin, Madison (1963), and TAU (1972). She served as chair of the International Exchange of Persons Advisory Screening Committee from 1966 to 1967.

In 1950, she released Swift's Satire on Learning, a monograph on Jonathan Swift's A Tale of a Tub. In 1962, she was appointed a Guggenheim Fellow to study the history of religious poetry. She was the editor of Bantam Books' 1962 collection of Swift works named Gulliver's Travels and Other Writings, as well as a 1967 poetry compilation titled Seventeenth-Century English Poetry. In 1967, she was a delegate to Swift's tercentenary celebrations in Dublin.

She became a naturalized American citizen in 1927. She had one child with his husband Philip J. Starkman. She lived in Forest Hills, Queens. She died on April 12, 2000.

== Bibliography ==
- Swift's Satire on Learning (1950)
- (ed.) Gulliver's Travels and Other Writings of Jonathan Swift (1962)
- (ed.) Seventeenth-Century English Poetry (1967)
