= Walter H. Williams =

American painter (1920–1998)

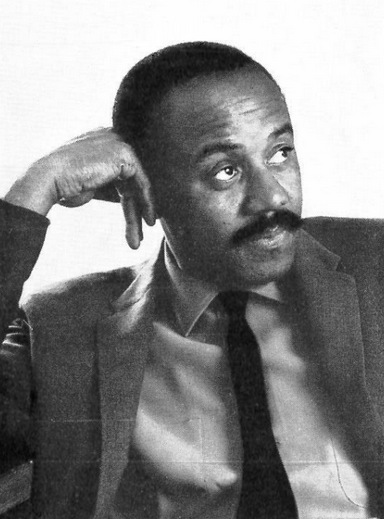
Walter Henry Williams Jr.

Walter Henry Williams Jr. (1920–1998) was an African American-born artist, painter, printmaker and ceramicist who became a Danish citizen later in his life. The subjects of his artwork evolved from urban street scenes straight out of his New York upbringing to the metaphorical images of rural Black children playing in fields of sunflowers, butterflies and shacks.

== Early life and education ==
He was born on August 11, 1920, to Walter and Louise Williams in Brooklyn, New York, one of two children. His mother was a domestic worker who also painted and encouraged his interest in art. His sister Dorothy, a year younger, would herself become an artist.

His mother died of pneumonia a year after she separated from his father. The children were raised by a strict father and stepmother, and William's dream of becoming an artist faded. He escaped into a childhood dream world that would reappear later in his woodcuts.

After high school, he was drafted into the Army in 1942, serving in France during World War II. He got married, had two children and worked blue-collar jobs to make a living. In 1948, he decided to pursue art and joined a group of artists and musicians, including Charlie "Bird" Parker, in Greenwich Village in New York. He shared a studio with several of the artists, some of whom like himself would eventually emigrate to Europe. They pushed him to use the GI Bill to take classes at the Brooklyn Museum School of Art. He attended the school from 1951 to 1955.

Williams received a scholarship to spend a summer at the Skowegan School of Painting and Sculpture in Maine in 1953. He roomed with artist David Driskell, the only other African American student there, who would become a lifelong friend. Driskell, who became a well-known art historian, teacher and curator, included Williams in many of the art exhibitions he organized over the years. Williams won a first-place award for painting at Skowegan.

In a 1976 newspaper essay chronicling the history of African American artists, renowned artist Romare Bearden described Williams as “gifted.”

== Evolution of his style and theme ==
Williams participated in several exhibits in the early 1950s. In 1953, he won a third prize gold medal for his painting “On the Railing” in the fourth annual exhibit for artists and students of New York City at the Harlem Branch of the YWCA. He was 32 years old, lived in Englewood, New Jersey, and was a student at the Brooklyn Museum school. The speaker at the event was artist Charles White.

That same year, he participated in a group show at the Whitney Museum of American Art’s 21st annual exhibition of contemporary artists. He submitted a painting titled “Store Front Christ.”

The next year, he had a solo exhibit at the Roko Gallery in New York. It would be the first of three shows over the ensuing years.

Williams’ early paintings depicted the life of Black people in the neighborhoods and in the jazz clubs around Brooklyn and Harlem where he grew up. The titles he chose represented the life he saw: “By The El (1955),” “Store Front Christ (1953),” “Poultry Market (1953), “Untitled (Seated Man with Bowed Head) (1951),” “Untitled (Cityscape) (1954),” “Untitled (Girl on a Fire Escape) (1954)” and “Quick Nap (1952),” (girl napping on a metal apartment railing).

His use of color, his style and his subjects were influenced by Gregorio Prestopino, one of his teachers at the Brooklyn Museum school, and Williams used what he learned to illustrate the children in his colorful paintings of urban life.

In 1955, he was awarded a John Hay Whitney Fellowship that he used to travel to Denmark. He chose the country because his mother's father was from the Danish West Indies, a former colony of Denmark, and had spoken to him about the country. He left for Denmark in 1956 and often visited its island of Bornholm where he saw landscapes for the first time, his second wife Marlena, a ceramicist and Danish citizen, noted. The trip changed the trajectory of his works, shifting the subjects from city streets to country fields with symbolic elements that denoted rebirth and freedom.

These new images of children in fields, sunflowers, butterflies, blackbirds and a bright sun appeared often in William's subsequent works, each taking on the theme of a southern landscape, the title of one of his paintings. Driskell noted that these new works held a deeper meaning:

“A boy chases after a butterfly, he is a black boy but the color of his skin does not hinder him from being every boy in the world who seeks to know the freedom of flight. A girl picks flowers and she witnesses the sumptuous smells of a thousand perfumes and colorful dreams … In all these visionary happenings, Walter Williams makes the joy of life unending.”

Williams also painted several versions of Madonna – a woodcut in 1965 and a colored pencil drawing in 1967.

He returned to the United States in 1957.

== Awards and exhibitions ==
In 1958, Ebony magazine included Williams in a cover story on young Black artists. In 1959, he was among the artists whose works were part of a traveling show titled “American Prints Today" sponsored by the Print Council of America. His entry was “Fighting Cock.” The exhibit was held simultaneously in eight U.S. cities. He also received a grant from the National Institute of Arts & Letters in 1960.

Williams spent the next decades in and out of the United States. From 1959 to 1963, he traveled and painted in Mexico, showing his works in several exhibitions, including at the Instituto Nacional de Bellas Artes in Mexico City. He told a Mexican reporter that “freedom from racial prejudice was essential” for him to develop as a person and an artist, an atmosphere he found in Mexico but not his native America. He returned to the United States but stayed for only a year.

In 1963, he received the $100 Perkin-Elmer prize for an oil painting in the Silvermine Guild of Artists annual competition. A year later, he returned to Copenhagen, where he curated an exhibit for expatriate artists titled “Ten American Negro Artists Living and Working in Europe.” The other artists featured were Harvey Cropper, Beauford Delaney, Herbert Gentry, Arthur Hardie, Clifford Jackson, Sam Middleton, Earl Miller, Norma Morgan and Larry Potter.

During his time abroad, Williams was represented in a number of exhibitions in foreign cities: Copenhagen, 1956 and 1957; Mexico City, 1963; Stockholm, 1965, and Sydney, Australia, 1965.

He was back in the United States in 1965 when his print “Girl with Butterflies #2” was purchased by the Smithsonian Institution for the Executive Wing of the White House under President Lyndon Johnson. The woodcut print was reproduced for the 1966 UNICEF calendar. He also exhibited at the Golden Door Gallery in New Hope, Pennsylvania.

Driskell tapped him to become an artist-in-residence in Fisk University’s Art Department in Nashville, where Driskell was chair. Williams was among six artists that Driskell hired to help build the department. Williams' wife Marlena accompanied him, and they set up a studio. He had developed an interest in pottery, and taught classes in this medium as well as painting and printmaking. He remained at Fisk for the 1968–1969 school year.

“I have only tried to teach the student that in painting today anything goes if the artist can make it work,” he told a reporter. “By making it work I mean making it a complete work within itself.”

The year before Williams began his residency, Driskell organized a two-man show for him as part of Fisk's 38th annual Festival of Music and Art in 1967. During his stay, his works were shown at the university, the Louisville (KY) Art Workshop (where most of the works were his woodcuts), the Parthenon (Nashville), Brooks Memorial Art Gallery (Memphis), Jackson (MS) State University, Studio 22 (Chicago), Lee Nordness Galleries (NY), Mount Holyoke College (MA) and Stephens College (MO).

In 1969, he was among 10 African American artists who exhibited at Mount Holyoke College in Hadley, MA. It was the first of its kind show for the university. Williams chartered a bus to the exhibition. Fifty years later, in 2019, the Mount Holyoke College Art Museum hosted an exhibition of works on loan from the collection of the David C. Driskell Center at the University of Maryland in College Park. Williams’ painting “Southern Landscape” was among them.

At the end of his residency at Fisk, he assembled a farewell exhibit of his paintings, color woodcuts and pottery at the school. in 1969, he and Marlena returned to Denmark, where he continued to work and also taught in his studio in Frederiksberg. Williams became a Danish citizen in 1979, giving up his U.S. citizenship.

In 1979, Williams wrote a note to Driskell stating that he was preparing some works to submit to the Studio Museum in Harlem for an upcoming show titled “An Ocean Apart: American Artists Abroad.” The show opened in 1982 and included works by Williams, Herbert Gentry, Sam Middleton and Clifford Jackson. The theme mimicked the exhibit Williams had mounted about a decade earlier.

One newspaper story noted that all had gained recognition in Europe before being acknowledged in the United States. One newspaper columnist mentioned that Gentry, Middleton and Jackson spoke about their work and experiences to a large audience at the show, but the article made no mention of Williams.

Williams' works are in many private collections. Nelson Rockefeller's was one of them. He owned the print “Harvest” until it was sold at auction in 2019 at Sotheby’s.

In 1973, Williams sent Driskell a catalog from a show in Copenhagen for which Driskell had written the introduction. A year earlier, Driskell had visited him in Denmark. Driskell related to a reporter what Williams had told him about his artwork:

“All my life I have been painting one picture. It is one that reflects my own image and the inner thoughts of my mind. I feel the naivete of a child when I paint yet I have the passions of the father that I am. I am an artist who is full of love for the world and all the images it holds.”

A devastating fire in 1980 destroyed Williams' studio, and all of his paintings and prints were lost. Depressed, he was unable to work for several months. Three years later, he stopped creating art altogether. The last exhibition he attended was the International Art Fair in Tokyo in 1985, where he represented Denmark.

== Personal life ==
In 1964, he married Marlena Jacobsen and they had a son. Williams died of liver cancer on June 13, 1998.

== Collections ==
Metropolitan Museum of Art

Brooklyn Museum of Art

Whitney Museum of American Art

National Gallery of Art

Cincinnati Art Museum

Riverside Museum of Art, NY

Philadelphia Museum of Art

The Studio Museum in Harlem

Georgia Museum of Art

Smithsonian American Art Museum

David C. Driskell Center

The Melvin Holmes Collection of African American Art

Petrucci Family Foundation Collection of African-American Art

Baltimore Museum of Art

The White House, National Collection of Fine Arts

Mexican American Institute, Mexico City

Howard University Gallery of Art

Fisk University Galleries

Middlebury College Museum of Art

== Selected exhibitions ==
YWCA, Harlem Branch, 1953

Whitney Museum of American Art, 1953, 1955, 1958, 1963

Oklahoma Art Center, 1958

Roko Gallery, 1954, 1962, 1963

Instituto Nacional de Dellas Artes, Mexico, 1958

Texas Southern University, 1962

Brooklyn Museum of Art, 1963

Fairleigh Dickinson University, 1964

Musee d’art et d’histoire, Geneva 1965

Golden Door Gallery, New Hope, PA, 1966

Pennsylvania Academy of the Fine Arts, 1966

College of Mount St. Joseph's, 1967

Fisk University, 1967, 1968, 1975, 2019

Cornell University, 1967

The Parthenon, Nashville, 1967

Louisville Art Workshop, 1969

Studio 22, Chicago, 1969

American Wind Symphony Orchestra Barge, Pittsburgh, 1969

Lee Nordness Galleries, NY, 1969

Mount Holyoke College, 1969

Brooks Memorial Arts Gallery, Memphis

Jackson (MS) State College, 1969

Stephens College, Missouri, 1968

Smithsonian American Art Museum, 1969, 2014

Hudson River Museum, 1970

Davenport Municipal Art Gallery, 1970

Cheekwood Estate and Gardens, Nashville, 1971

National Armory, Wilmington, DE, 1971

Art Consortium, Cincinnati, 1979

Studio Museum of Harlem, 1982

New Orleans Museum of Art, 1984

Kenkeleba House, 1986

Glatt House Gallery, Salem, OR, 1991

M. Hanks Gallery, 2004

Baltimore Museum of Art, 2015
