= Gesta (journal) =

- Discipline: Art history
- Language: English
- Edited by: Linda Safran, Adam S. Cohen

Publication details
- History: 1963-present
- Publisher: University of Chicago Press for the International Center of Medieval Art
- Frequency: Biannual

Standard abbreviations
- ISO 4: Gesta

Indexing
- ISSN: 0016-920X (print); 2169-3099 (web)
- LCCN: 65005114
- JSTOR: 0016920X
- OCLC no.: 1606201

Links
- Journal homepage

Gesta is a peer-reviewed academic journal in the area of medieval art. It was established in 1963 and is published by the University of Chicago Press. The editors-in-chief are Diane J. Reilly (Indiana University Bloomington) and Susan L. Boynton (Columbia University).
