= Luiz de Aguiar Costa Pinto =

Luiz de Aguiar Costa Pinto (February 6, 1920 – November 1, 2002) was a Brazilian sociologist. In his work, Costa Pinto specialized in race relations in Brazil. In 1949 he was invited by Arthur Ramos to help UNESCO formulate their landmark UNESCO statement The Race Question, in 1950. In the latter part of his career, in Canada, Costa Pinto taught first at Queen's University, and then at the University of Waterloo.

== Early life ==
Costa Pinto was born in Salvador on February 6, 1920 to family of the Bahian Elite who owned sugar mills in the Recôncavo Baiano region. after the death of his father, he moved with his family to Rio de Janeiro in 1937 and subsequently became involved in the Communist Youth Union (Brazil). In 1939, he began studying Social Sciences at the new National Faculty of Philosophy (Faculdade Nacional de Filosofia, FNFi), and was soon arrested for his opposition to the Estado Novo (Portugal).

He was a member of the first generation of major contemporary Brazilian Sociologists, working with Florestan Fernandes, Roger Bastide, Oracy Nogueira and Thales de Azevedo. Costa Pinto was born in Salvador, and died in Waterloo, Canada.
