= List of Yale University people =

Yalies are persons affiliated with Yale University, commonly including alumni, current and former faculty members, students, and others. Here follows a list of notable Yalies.

== Alumni ==
For a list of notable alumni of Yale Law School, see List of Yale Law School alumni.

== Prize recipients ==
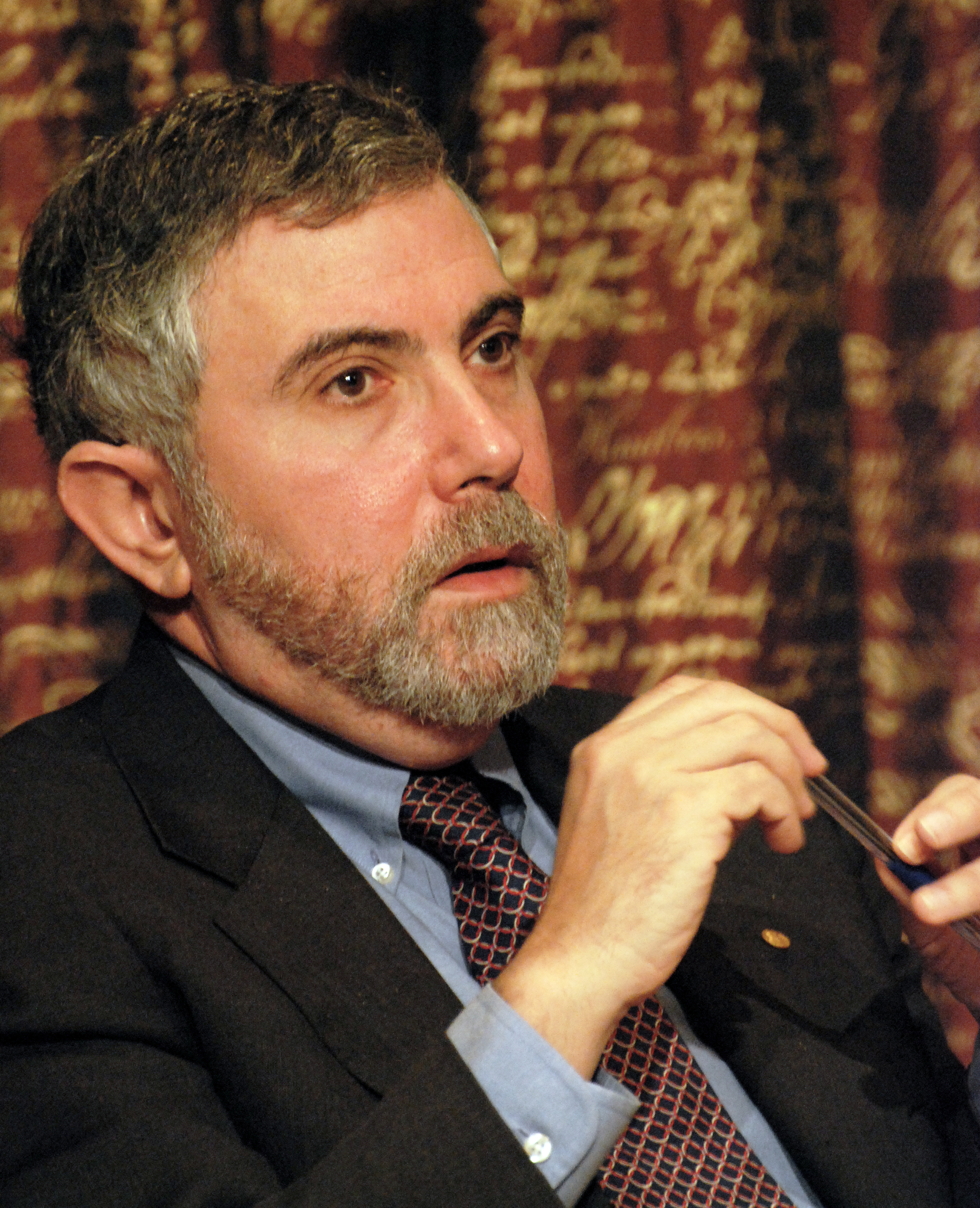
Paul Krugman

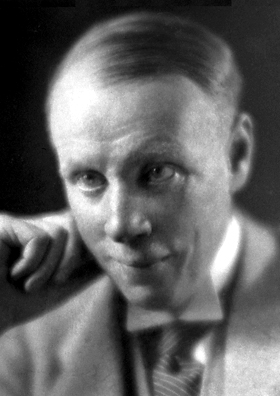
Sinclair Lewis

=== Nobel laureates ===
- George Akerlof (B.A. 1962), Economics, 2001
- Raymond Davis Jr. (Ph.D. 1942), Physics, 2002
- Douglas Diamond (M.A. 1976, M.Phil. 1977, PhD 1980), Economics, 2022
- Peter A. Diamond (B.A. 1960), Economics, 2010
- Philip H. Dybvig (M.A. 1978, M.Phil. 1978, PhD 1979), Economics, 2022
- John F. Enders (B.A. 1920), Physiology or Medicine, 1954
- John Fenn (Ph.D. 1940), Chemistry, 2002
- Murray Gell-Mann (B.S. 1948), Physics, 1969
- Alfred G. Gilman (B.S. 1962), Physiology or Medicine, 1994
- John B. Goodenough (B.S. 1944), Chemistry, 2019
- Brian Kobilka (M.D. 1981), Chemistry, 2012
- Paul Krugman (B.A. Economics, 1974), Economics, 2008; architect of "New Trade Theory"; winner of the John Bates Clark Medal; Princeton University economics professor; New York Times columnist
- Ernest Lawrence (Ph.D. 1925), Physics, 1939; Lawrence Livermore National Laboratory, Lawrence Berkeley National Laboratory, and the element Lawrencium are named for him
- Joshua Lederberg (Ph.D. 1948), Physiology or Medicine, 1958
- David Lee (Ph.D. 1959), Physics, 1996
- Sinclair Lewis (B.A. 1908), Literature, 1930
- Joel Mokyr (Ph.D. 1974), Economics, 2025
- William Nordhaus (B.A. 1963), Economics, 2018
- Lars Onsager (Ph.D. 1935), Chemistry, 1968
- Edmund Phelps (Ph.D. 1959), Economics, 2006
- Dickinson W. Richards (B.A. 1917), Physiology or Medicine, 1956
- James A. Robinson (Ph.D. 1993), Economics, 2024
- James Rothman (B.A. 1971), Physiology or Medicine, 2013
- William Vickrey (B.S. 1935), Economics, 1996
- George Whipple (A.B. 1900), Physiology or Medicine, 1934
- Eric Wieschaus (Ph.D. 1974), Physiology or Medicine, 1995

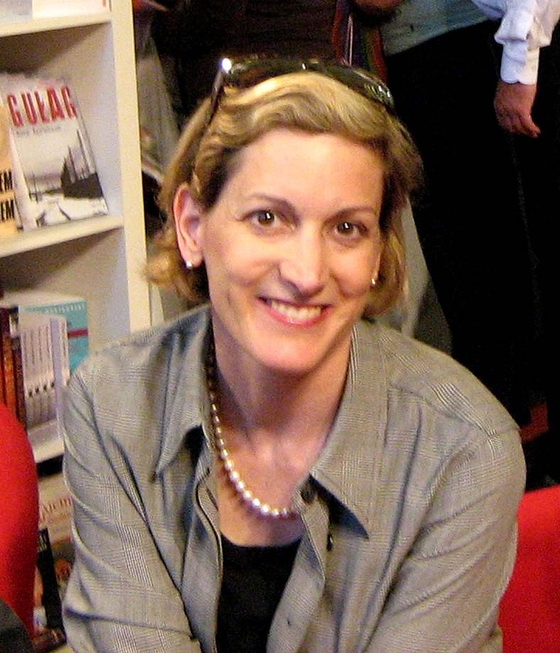
Anne Applebaum

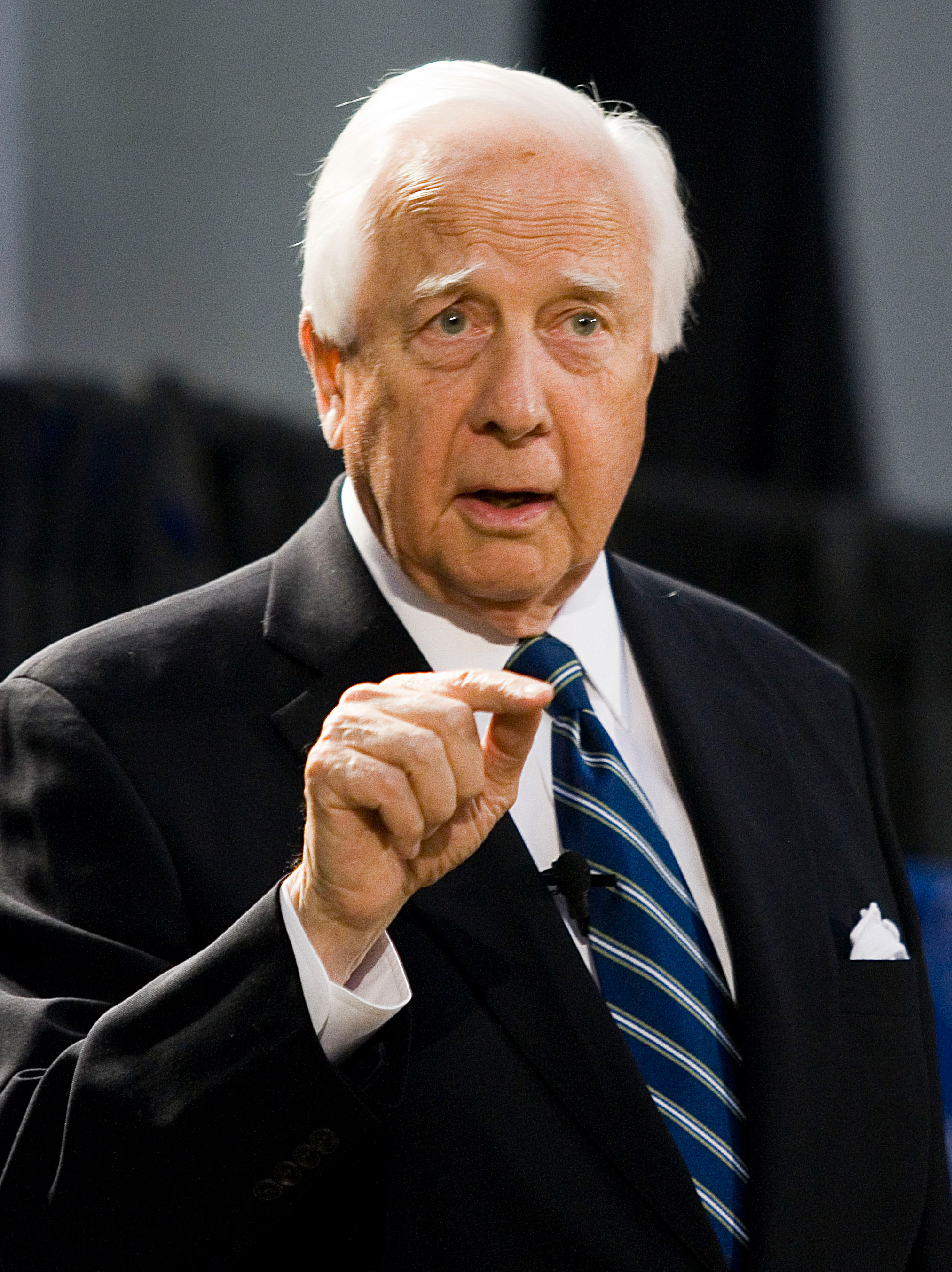
David McCullough

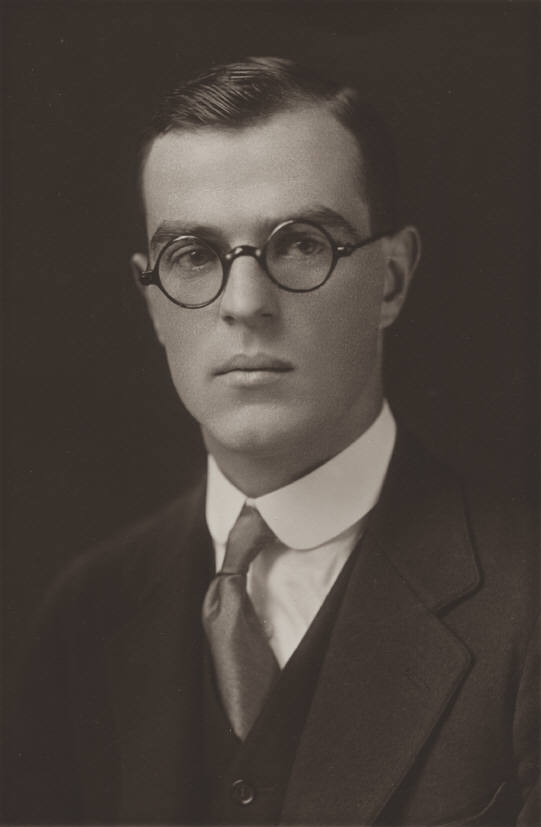
Thornton Wilder (Yale graduation photo)

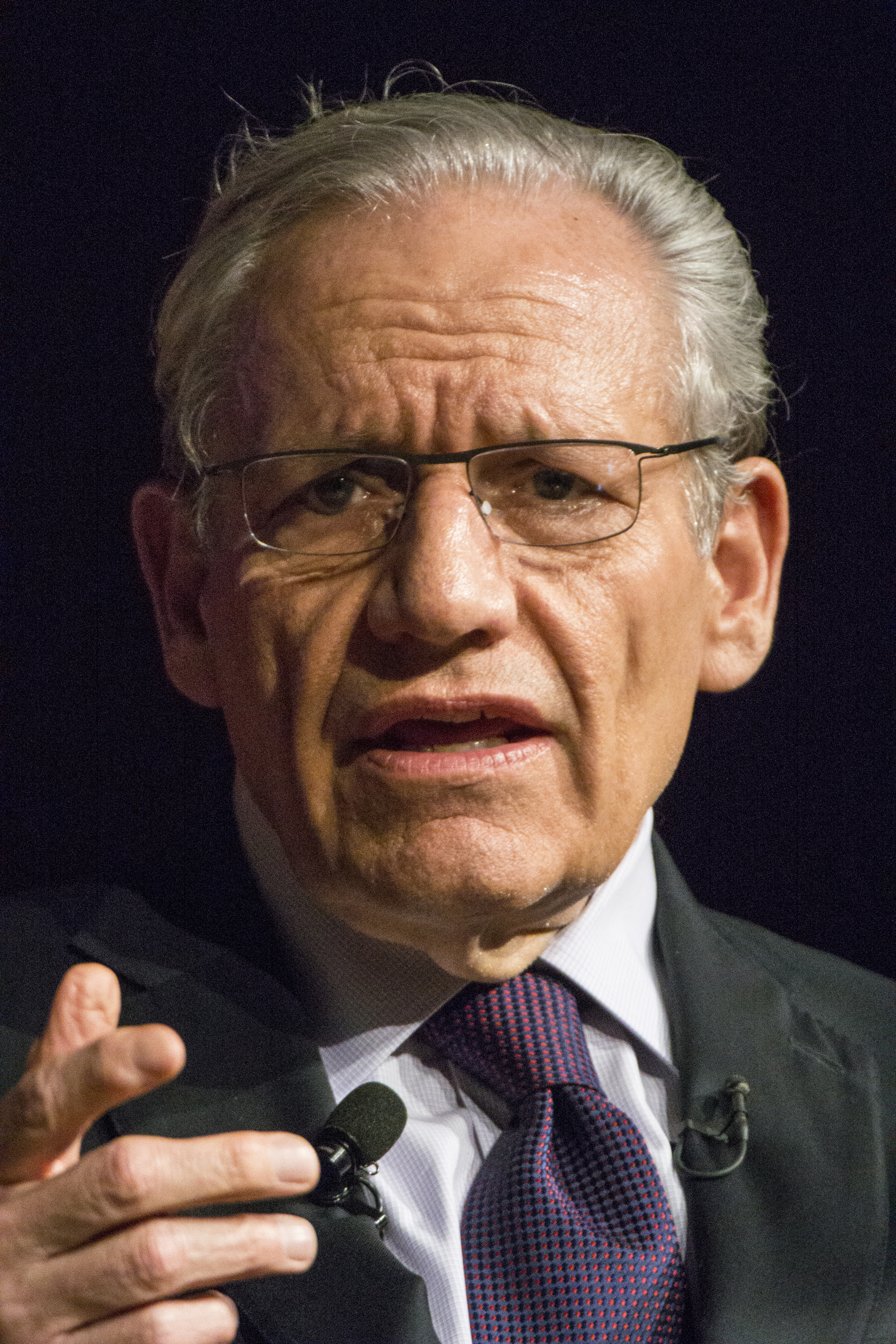
Bob Woodward

=== Pulitzer Prize winners ===
- Anne Applebaum (B.A. 1986), 2004 Pulitzer Prize for nonfiction
- Ellen Barry (B.A. 1993), 2011 Pulitzer Prize for International Reporting
- Charles Bartlett (B.A. 1943), 1956 Pulitzer Prize for National Reporting
- Stephen Vincent Benét (B.A. 1919, M.A. 1920), 2× Pulitzer-winning author
- Ron Chernow (B.A. 1970), 2011 Pulitzer Prize for biography of George Washington
- Anthony R. Dolan (B.A. 1970), 1978 Pulitzer Prize for investigative reporting
- Charles Forelle (B.A. 2002), co-author of articles for which The Wall Street Journal Pulitzer Prize for Public Service in 2007
- John Lewis Gaddis, 2012 Pulitzer Prize for Biography, Cold War historian
- Paul Goldberger (B.A. 1972), 1984 Pulitzer Prize for Distinguished Criticism
- Stephen Greenblatt (B.A. 1964, M.Phil 1968, Ph.D. 1969), general editor of The Norton Shakespeare, 2012 Pulitzer Prize for General Nonfiction
- Linda Greenhouse (M.A. 1978), U.S. Supreme Court correspondent for The New York Times, received the Pulitzer in 1998
- John Hersey (B.A. 1936), Pulitzer-winning author in 1945 for the novel A Bell for Adano, namesake of the annual John Hersey Lecture at Yale
- Quiara Alegría Hudes (B.A. 1999), playwright, writer of In the Heights, 2012 Pulitzer Prize for Drama
- Charles Ives (B.A. 1898), 1947 Pulitzer Prize for Music
- Michiko Kakutani (B.A. 1976), book critic for The New York Times, 1998 Pulitzer Prize for Criticism
- David M. Kennedy (M.A. 1964, Ph.D. 1968), 2000 Pulitzer Prize for History for "Freedom from Fear: The American People in Depression and War, 1929–45"
- Elizabeth Kolbert (B.A. 1983), 2015 Pulitzer Prize for General Nonfiction
- David McCullough (B.A. 1955), popular historian, winner of two Pulitzers, best known for his books on American presidents Harry S. Truman and John Adams
- J.R. Moehringer (B.A. 1986), Los Angeles Times reporter, 2000 Pulitzer Prize for Feature Writing
- Douglas Moore (B.A. 1915), 1951 Pulitzer, Music
- Wesley Morris (B.A. 1997), critic-at-large for New York Times, former film critic at The Boston Globe, 2012 Pulitzer Prize for Criticism
- Lynn Nottage (M.F.A.), playwright and Pulitzer Prize–winning dramatist of Ruined
- Mel Powell (B.A. 1952), 1990 Pulitzer Prize for Music for Duplicates: A Concerto for Two Pianos and Orchestra; founding dean and professor of music of the California Institute of the Arts
- Samantha Power (B.A. 1992), Pulitzer Prize for the book A Problem from Hell: America and the Age of Genocide
- Kevin Puts (M.M. 1996), 2012 Pulitzer Prize for Music
- Thomas E. Ricks (B.A. 1977), 2000 Pulitzer Prize for National Reporting (on The Wall Street Journal team); former reporter who writes on defense topics
- Mark Schoofs (B.A. 1985), reporter, 2000 Pulitzer Prize for international reporting
- Lewis Spratlan (B.A. 1962, M.M. 1965), composer, 2000 Pulitzer Prize for Music for Life is a Dream, Opera in Three Acts: Act II, Concert Version
- Jeffrey C. Stewart, Pulitzer Prize in 2019 for his biography of Alain LeRoy Locke, The New Negro
- Garry Trudeau (B.A. 1970, M.F.A. 1973), Pulitzer Prize in 1975 for his comic strip Doonesbury
- Wendy Wasserstein (M.F.A. 1976), playwright and Pulitzer Prize-winning dramatist of The Heidi Chronicles
- Thornton Wilder (B.A. 1920), playwright, winner of two Pulitzers, the first in 1928 for The Bridge of San Luis Rey, and the second in 1938 for the play Our Town; recipient of the Presidential Medal of Freedom in 1963
- Bob Woodward (B.A. 1965), journalist, co-author of the Pulitzer-winning book All the President's Men, won a second Pulitzer in 2002 for National Reporting
- Doug Wright (B.A. 1985), screenwriter, winner of the 2004 Pulitzer Prize for drama, winner of a Tony Award
- Yehudi Wyner (B.A. 1950, B. Mus. 1951, M. Mus. 1953), composer, recipient of the Pulitzer Prize for Music in 2006 for his piano concerto 'Chiavi in Mano'; professor emeritus of musical composition at Brandeis University
- Daniel Yergin (B.A. 1968), wrote Pulitzer-winning The Prize: The Epic Quest for Oil, Money, and Power; founded Cambridge Energy Research Associates

=== Abel laureates ===
- Robert Langlands (Ph.D. 1960), 2018
- John G. Thompson (B.A. 1955), 2008

== Architecture and visual arts ==
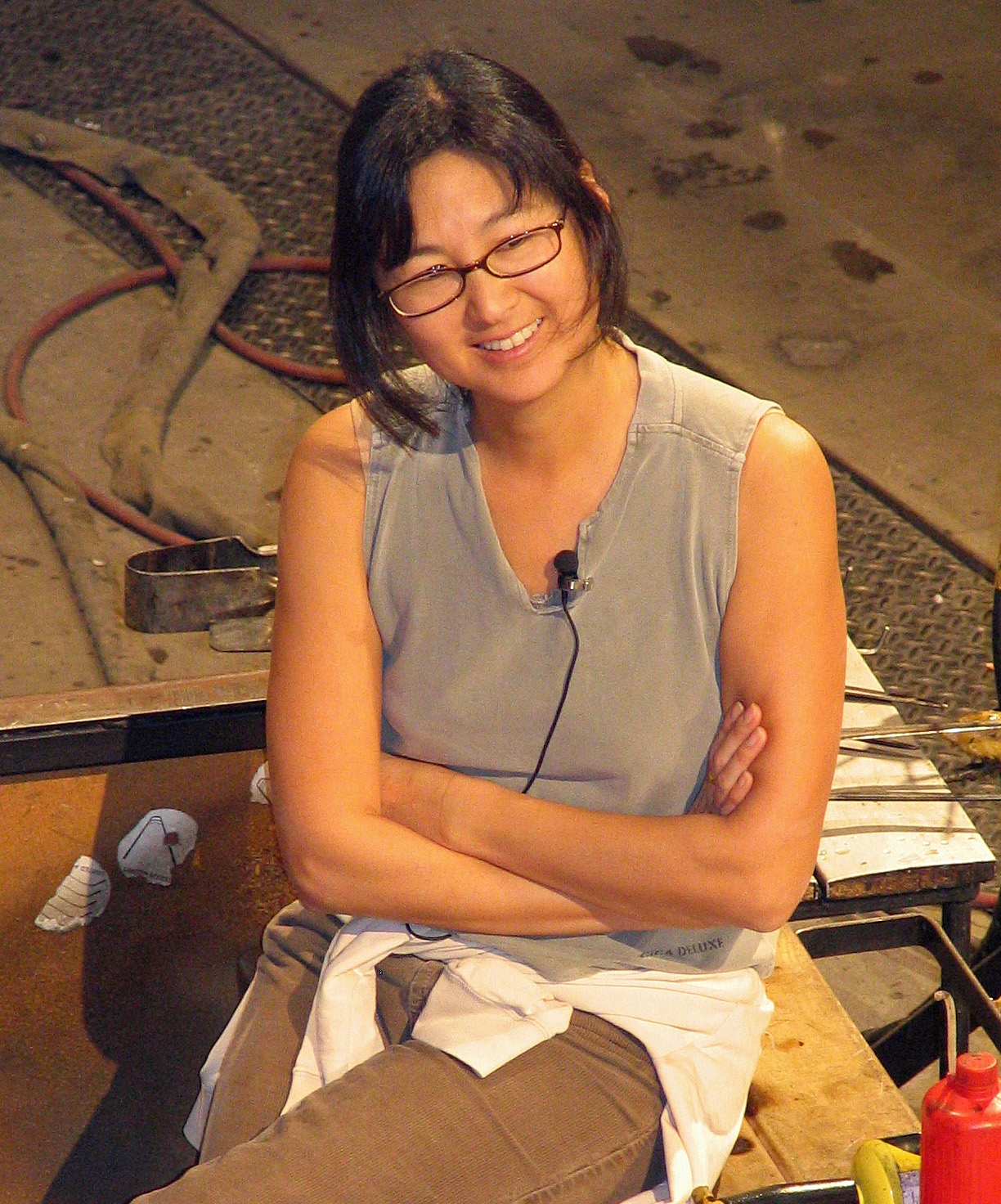
Maya Lin

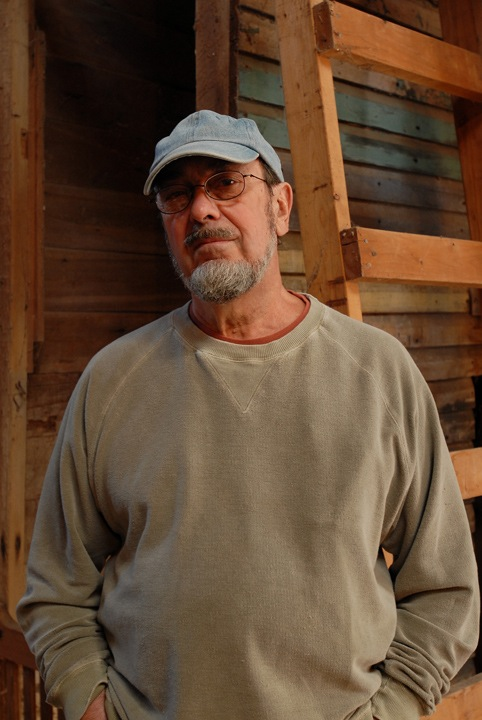
Robert Mangold

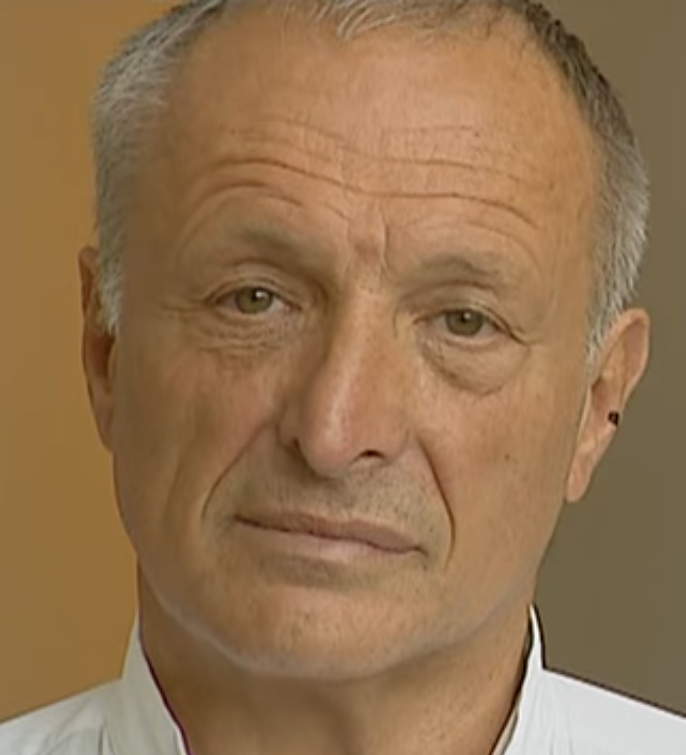
Richard Rogers

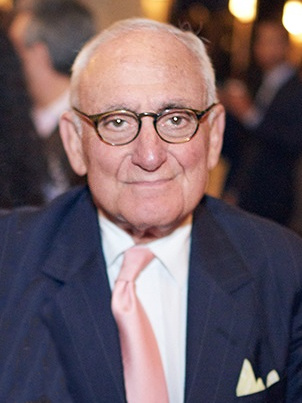
Robert A. M. Stern

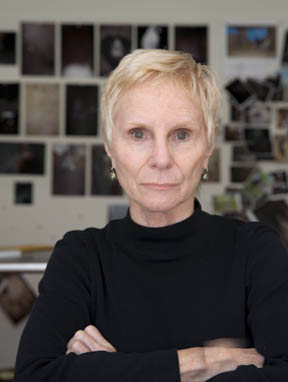
Constance Thalken

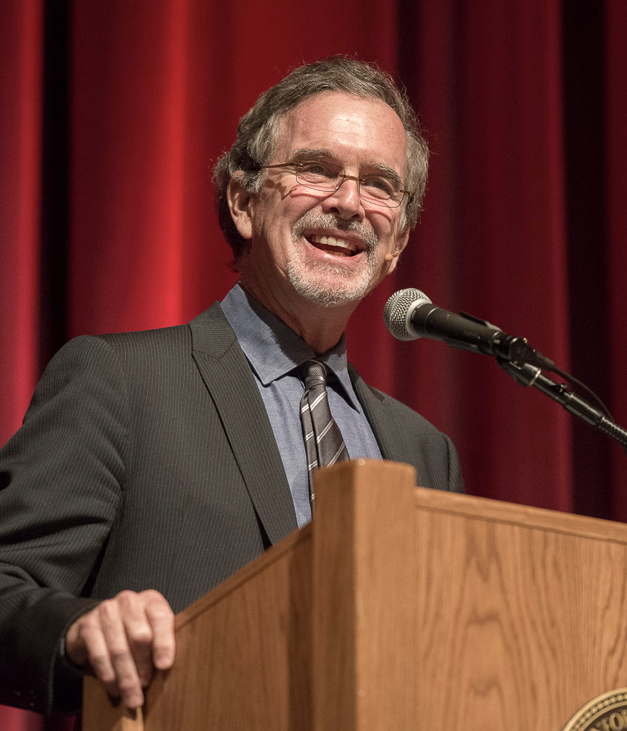
Garry Trudeau

- Richard Anuszkiewicz (M.F.A. 1955), painter
- Graham Arader (B.A. 1972), art dealer
- Matthew Barney (B.A. 1989), artist
- Jennifer Bartlett (M.F.A 1965), painter
- Eve Blau (M.A. 1974, Ph.D. 1978), art historian
- Barbara Bloemink (M.Phil., Ph.D.), art historian
- Jonathan Borofsky (M.F.A. 1966), artist
- Robert Branner (B.A. 1948, Ph.D. 1953), art historian
- Theophilus Brown (B.F.A. 1941), painter
- Norman Carlberg (B.F.A. 1958, M.F.A. 1961), sculptor
- Kermit S. Champa (B.A. 1960), art historian
- Chuck Close (M.F.A. 1964), painter
- William Cordova (M.F.A. 2004), cultural practitioner
- Gregory Crewdson (M.F.A. 1988), photographer
- Sumner McKnight Crosby (B.A. 1932, Ph.D. 1937), art historian
- John Currin (M.F.A. 1986), painter
- Brian D'Amato (B.A. 1984), sculptor and novelist
- Edward D. Dart (B.A. 1949), architect
- Philip-Lorca diCorcia (M.F.A. 1979), photographer
- Rackstraw Downes (B.F.A. 1963, M.F.A 1964), painter
- Leya Evelyn (M.F.A.), painter
- Janet Fish (M.F.A. 1963), painter
- Paul Fontaine (B.F.A. 1935), painter
- Norman Foster (M.Arch. 1961), architect
- Helen Frank, painter and printmaker
- Ann Gale (M.F.A. 1991), painter and educator
- Aaron Gilbert (M.F.A. 2008), painter
- Brendan Gill (B.A. 1936), architecture critic
- Steve Giovinco (M.F.A. 1989), photographer
- John Graham Jr. (1931), architect
- Katy Grannan (M.F.A. 1999), photographer
- Nancy Graves (B.F.A. 1962, M.F.A. 1964), sculptor
- George Heard Hamilton (B.A. 1932, M.A. 1934, Ph.D. 1942), art historian
- Jodi Hauptman (M.A., Ph.D. 1995), art historian
- Phoebe Helander (M.F.A. 2019), painter
- Linda Dalrymple Henderson (M.A. 1972, Ph.D. 1975), art historian
- Barkley L. Hendricks (B.F.A. 1970, M.F.A. 1972), painter
- Eva Hesse (M.F.A. 1959), sculptor
- Dana Hoey (M.F.A. 1997), photographer
- Muzharul Islam (M.Arch. 1961), architect
- Norman Ives (M.F.A. 1952), artist and educator
- Johannes Knoops (M.Arch. II 1995), architect and educator
- Justine Kurland (M.F.A. 1998), photographer
- Jack Lembeck (MFA 1970), painter and sculptor
- Neil Levine (Ph.D. 1975), art historian and educator
- Maya Lin (B.A. 1981, M.Arch. 1986, honorary Ph.D. 1987), architect
- Holly Lynton (B.A. 1994), photographer
- Tala Madani (M.F.A. 2006), painter
- Robert Mangold (B.F.A. 1961, M.F.A. 1963), painter
- Brice Marden (M.F.A. 1963), painter
- Malerie Marder (M.F.A. 1998), photographer
- Herbert P. McLaughlin (B.A. 1956, M.Arch. 1958), architect
- Patrick McNaughton (M.A. 1972, Ph.D. 1977), art historian
- Joshua Meyer (B.A. 1996), painter
- Amy Meyers (Ph.D. 1985), art historian
- Alexander Nemerov (M.A. 1987, Ph.D. 1992), art historian
- Hally Pancer (M.F.A. 1988), photographer
- Scott Pask (M.F.A. 1997), scenic designer
- Hayal Pozanti (M.F.A. 2011), painter
- Joshua Prince-Ramus (B.A. 1991), architect
- Martin Puryear (M.F.A. 1971), sculptor
- Romita Ray (M.A. 1994, M.Phil. 1995, Ph.D. 1999), art historian
- Richard Rogers (M.Arch. 1962), architect
- Mark Rothko (B.A. 1924), painter
- Leo Rubinfien (M.F.A. 1976), photographer
- Eero Saarinen (B.Arch. 1934), architect
- Vincent Scully (B.A. 1940), art historian
- Richard Serra (B.F.A., M.F.A. 1964), sculptor
- Daniel Sherer (BA, 1985), architectural and art historian
- Sewell Sillman (B.F.A., M.F.A. 1953)
- Rodney Smith (Th.M. 1973), photographer
- Henry Steiner (M.A. 1958). graphic designer
- Robert A. M. Stern (M.Arch. 1965), architect and educator
- Peter C. Sutton (M.A. 1975, Ph.D. 1978), art historian
- Sarah Sze (B.A. 1991), sculptor
- Ann Temkin (Ph.D. 1984), curator
- Constance Thalken (M.F.A 1988), photographer
- Garry Trudeau (B.A. 1970, M.F.A. 1973), cartoonist
- Marc Trujillo (M.F.A. 1994), painter
- Katie Vida (M.F.A. 2010), artist and curator
- Kehinde Wiley (M.F.A. 2001), painter
- William T. Williams (M.F.A. 1968), artist
- Evans Woollen III (B.A., M.Arch. 1952), architect
- Ma Yansong (M.Arch. 2002), architect

== Arts and humanities ==
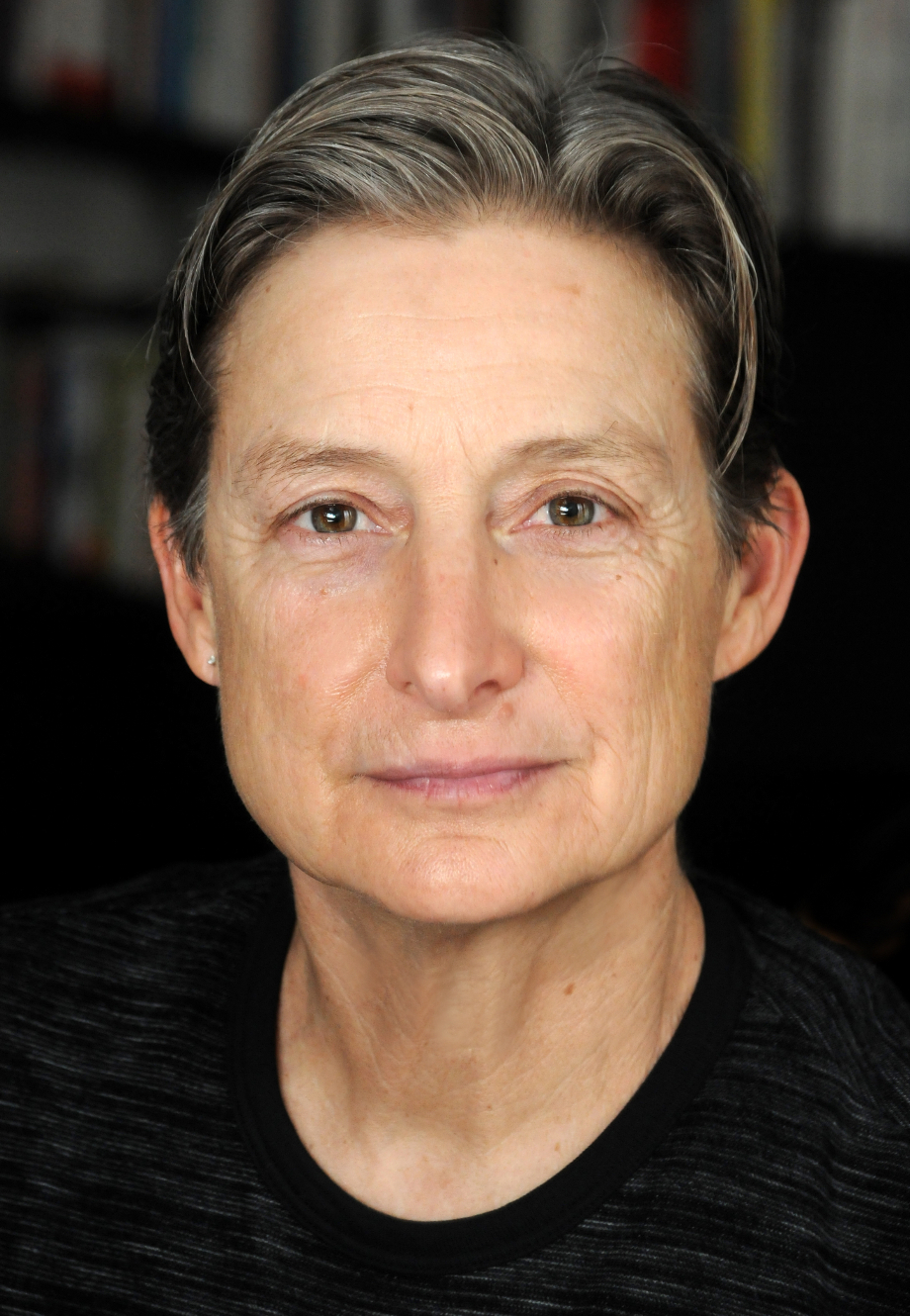
Judith Butler

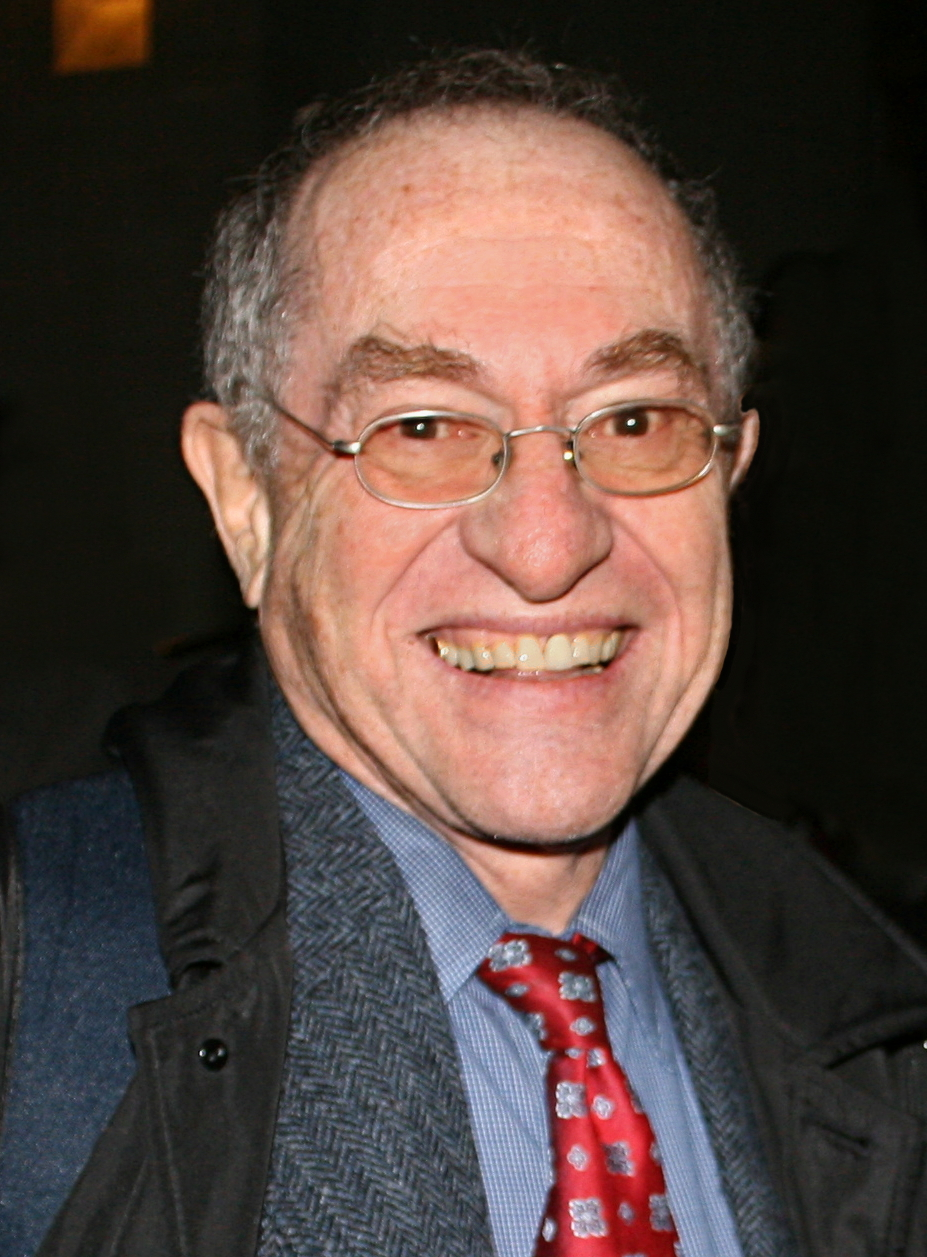
Alan Dershowitz

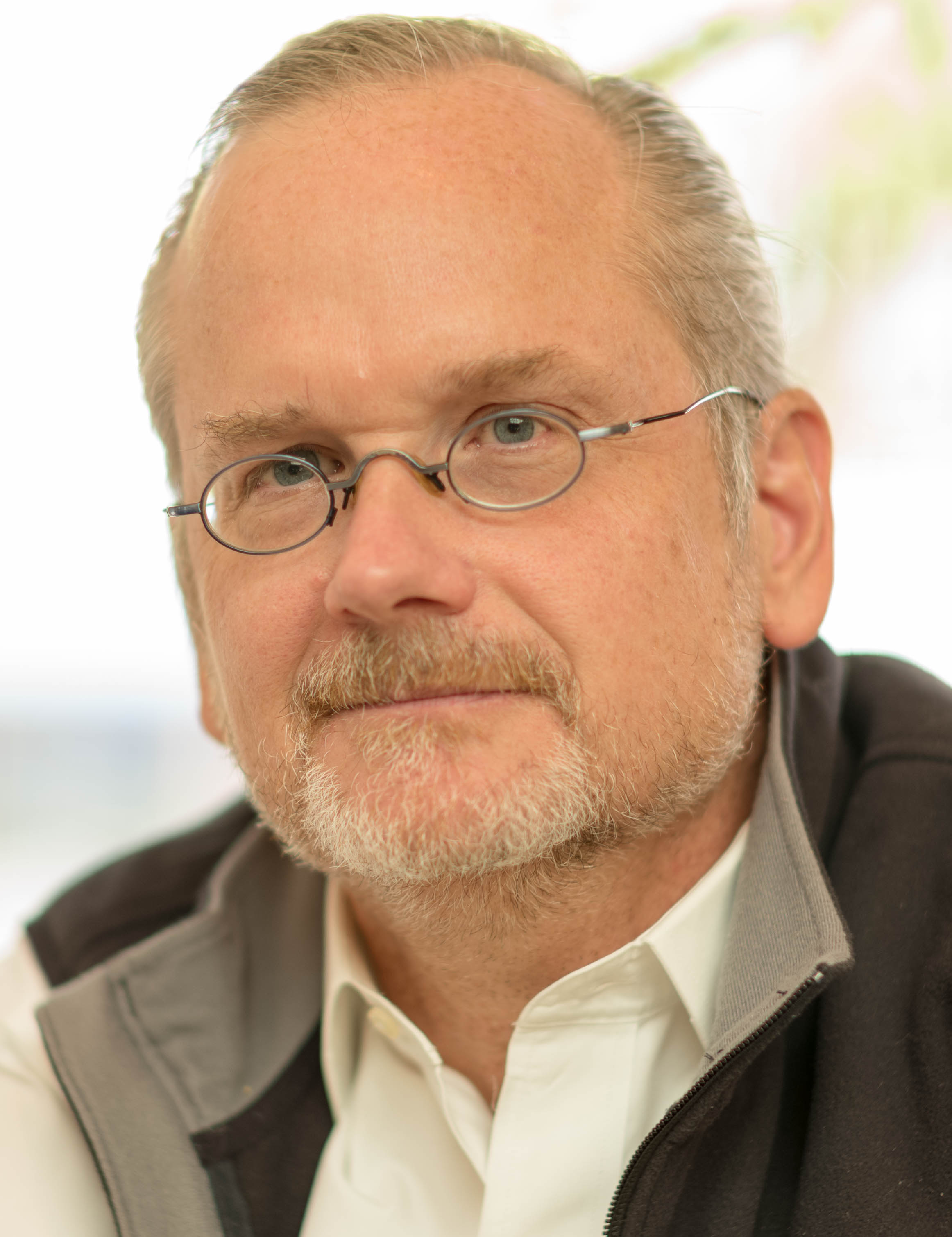
Lawrence Lessig

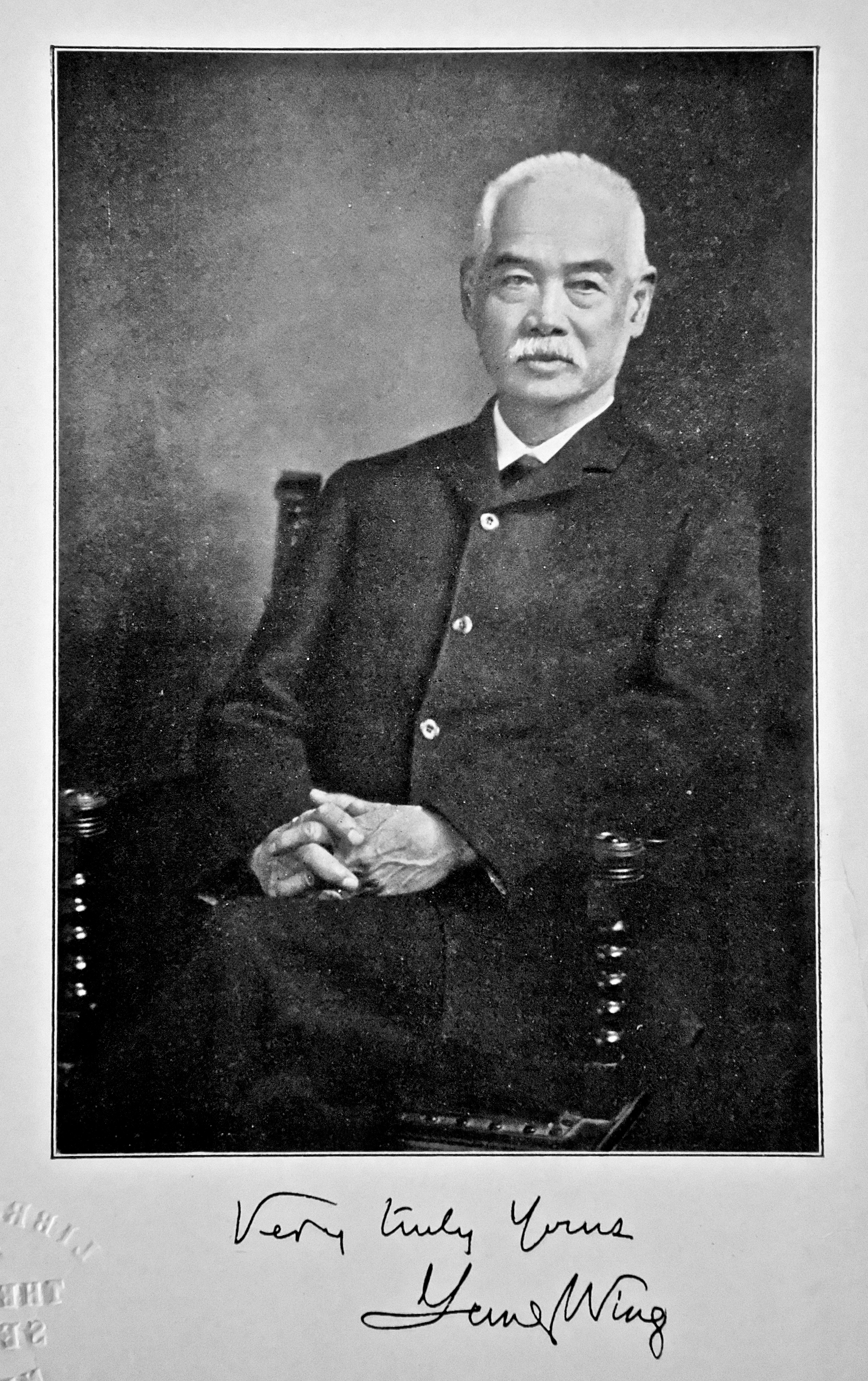
Yung Wing

- Frank Aarebrot, professor of comparative politics at University of Bergen
- James S. Ackerman (B.A.), Arthur Kingsley Porter Professor of History of Art and Architecture, Harvard
- Diogenes Allen (B.D., Ph.D. 1964), philosopher, theologian, professor at Princeton Theological Seminary (1981–2002)
- Edward J. Balleisen (Ph.D. 1995), professor of history at Duke University
- Jean Blackburn (M.F.A.), visual artist, illustrator, and professor of illustration
- Christopher James Bonner, historian
- David Boren (B.A. 1963), governor of Oklahoma (1975–1979), U.S. senator (1979–1994), president of University of Oklahoma
- Robert Brandom (B.A. 1972), philosopher at the University of Pittsburgh
- Leo Braudy (Ph.D. 1967), university professor, University of Southern California, literary and cultural critic
- Susan Buck-Morss (M.A.), philosopher, intellectual historian, professor of political science at CUNY Graduate Center
- Michael Burns (Ph.D. 1980), actor on Wagon Train and It's a Man's World, and emeritus professor of history at Mount Holyoke College
- Judith Butler (Ph.D. 1984), author of Gender Trouble, philosopher, queer theorist, and feminist scholar
- Susan Casteras (M.A. 1973, M.Phil. 1975, Ph.D. 1977), art historian
- Steve Charnovitz (B.A. 1975, J.D. 1998), law professor at George Washington University
- Janet Coleman (B.A., M.Phil., Ph.D.), professor of Ancient & Medieval Political Thought, London School of Economics
- William Cornyn (A.M. 1942, Ph.D. 1944), professor of Slavic and South East Asian Linguistics
- Catherine Cusset (Ph.D. 1991), French novelist and author of Life of David Hockney: A Novel.
- Leo Damrosch (B.A. 1963), professor at Harvard University, 2005 National Book Award finalist for Jean-Jacques Rousseau: Restless Genius
- Alan Dershowitz (LL.B. 1962), law professor at Harvard University
- Jeff Dolven, professor of English at Princeton University
- David Bates Douglass, professor at the U.S. Military Academy, President of Kenyon College, designer of Green-Wood Cemetery, member of Lewis Cass expedition of 1820
- Jacques Ehrmann, literary theorist and French Department professor, 1961–1972
- John C. Ewers (M.A. 1934), ethnologist and first Director of the National Museum of American History
- Robert Fagles (M.A., 1956, Ph.D. 1959), professor of English and Comparative Literature at Princeton University, poet, translator of classics
- Tommy Fitzpatrick (M.F.A., 1993), professor, painter
- Edward Foley, theorist of the blue shift and former Ohio Solicitor General
- Donald Gallup, bibliographer and curator of the Yale Collection of American Literature
- Henry Louis Gates Jr. (B.A., M.A. 1973), professor, chair of Harvard's African and African American Studies department
- Roxane Gay, writer and professor
- Roberto S. Goizueta (B.A., 1976), professor of theology, Boston College
- Daniel Harrison (Ph.D 1986), chairman of Department of Music, Yale University
- Lena Hill (Ph.D. 2005), professor of English and Africana studies, provost of Washington and Lee University
- Faye Hirsch (Ph.D.), art critic, writer, educator
- Benjamin Hoffmann (Ph.D. 2015), French creative writer and professor at Ohio State University
- Cajetan Iheka, professor of English, editor-in-chief of African Studies
- Annette Insdorf (Ph.D. 1975), film historian and author
- Fredric Jameson (Ph.D. 1959), cultural theorist; author of Postmodernism, or, the Cultural Logic of Late Capitalism; chair of Duke University's Literature Program
- Mimi Jennewein (B.A. 1942), painter and muralist
- Mitchell James Kaplan (B.A. 1979), novelist
- David Kolb (M.Phil. 1970, Ph.D. 1972), philosopher at Bates College
- Hart Day Leavitt (B.A. 1934), English teacher, Phillips Academy, Andover, Massachusetts, 1937–1975
- Lawrence Lessig (J.D. 1989), copyright activist, law professor at Harvard University
- Anya Liftig (B.A., 1999), performance artist
- Hilary Liftin, author
- Robert Oscar Lopez (B.A. 1993), associate professor of English and classics at California State University, Northridge
- F. O. Matthiessen (B.A. 1923), literary historian, professor at Harvard University
- Christie McDonald (Ph.D.), Smith Research Professor of French Language and Literature at Harvard University
- Scotty McLennan (B.A. 1970), dean for Religious Life at Stanford University
- Thomas V. Morris (Ph.D.), former University of Notre Dame philosophy professor, currently founding chairman of the Morris Institute of Human Values
- Nicholas Muellner (B.A. 1991), photographer and writer; professor of media arts, sciences and studies at Ithaca College
- Don Nakanishi (B.S. 1971), former professor of Asian American studies at University of California, Los Angeles
- Robert C. Neville (B.A., M.A., Ph.D. 1963), professor of philosophy, professor of religious studies and professor of theology at Boston University
- Reinhold Niebuhr (B.D. 1914), author, theologian, Serenity Prayer
- Bilal Orfali (Ph.D. 2009), professor of Arabic language and Islamic studies at the American University of Beirut
- Camille Paglia (Ph.D. 1972), author of Sexual Personae, cultural critic and feminist scholar
- Andrew Pessin, philosopher at Connecticut College
- Alvin Plantinga (Ph.D. 1958), Christian philosopher, professor at University of Notre Dame
- Eileen Pollack (B.S.), professor of creative writing at University of Michigan
- Stone Roberts (B.A. 1973), visual artist
- Richard Rorty (Ph.D. 1956), philosopher and professor of Humanities at University of Virginia, 1982–1998 and Stanford University, 1998–2007
- Ofelia Schutte, professor of philosophy at the University of South Florida
- T. K. Seung (B.A., Ph.D.), professor of philosophy, government, and law at the University of Texas at Austin
- Derek Shearer (B.A.), director of the McKinnon Center for Global Affairs and Chevalier Professor of Diplomacy and World Affairs of Occidental College, former U.S. ambassador to Finland
- Robert B. Stepto, professor of English, pioneering African-American studies scholar
- Matthias Storme, professor of law at the Catholic University of Louvain and the University of Antwerp
- Richard Sugarman (born 1944) (B.A. & M.A.), professor of philosophy and religion at the University of Vermont; advisor to Bernie Sanders
- Frank Bigelow Tarbell (B.A. 1873, Ph.D. 1879), historian, archeologist and professor of classic studies at Yale and University of Chicago
- Dominic Thomas (Ph.D. 1996), chair of the department of French and Francophone Studies at UCLA
- Amor Towles (B.A.), novelist and author of A Gentleman in Moscow
- Donald Goddard Wing, librarian and bibliographer, of Yale University Library
- Yung Wing (B.A. 1854), first Chinese person to receive an American college degree
- Sarah E. Winter (Ph.D. 1992), professor of English at the University of Connecticut
- Bess Wohl (M.F.A.), playwright of Liberation
- Jada Yuan (B.A. 2000), journalist and author
- Hossein Ziai (B.A. 1967), intensive mathematics and physics; (Ph.D. Harvard 1976), medieval philosophy. Jahangir and Eleanor Amuzegar Chair in Iranian Studies UCLA.
- Rose Zimbardo (M.A. 1957, Ph.D. 1960), professor of English at Stony Brook University
- Deborah Zlotsky (B.A. 1985), visual artist and educator

== Athletics ==
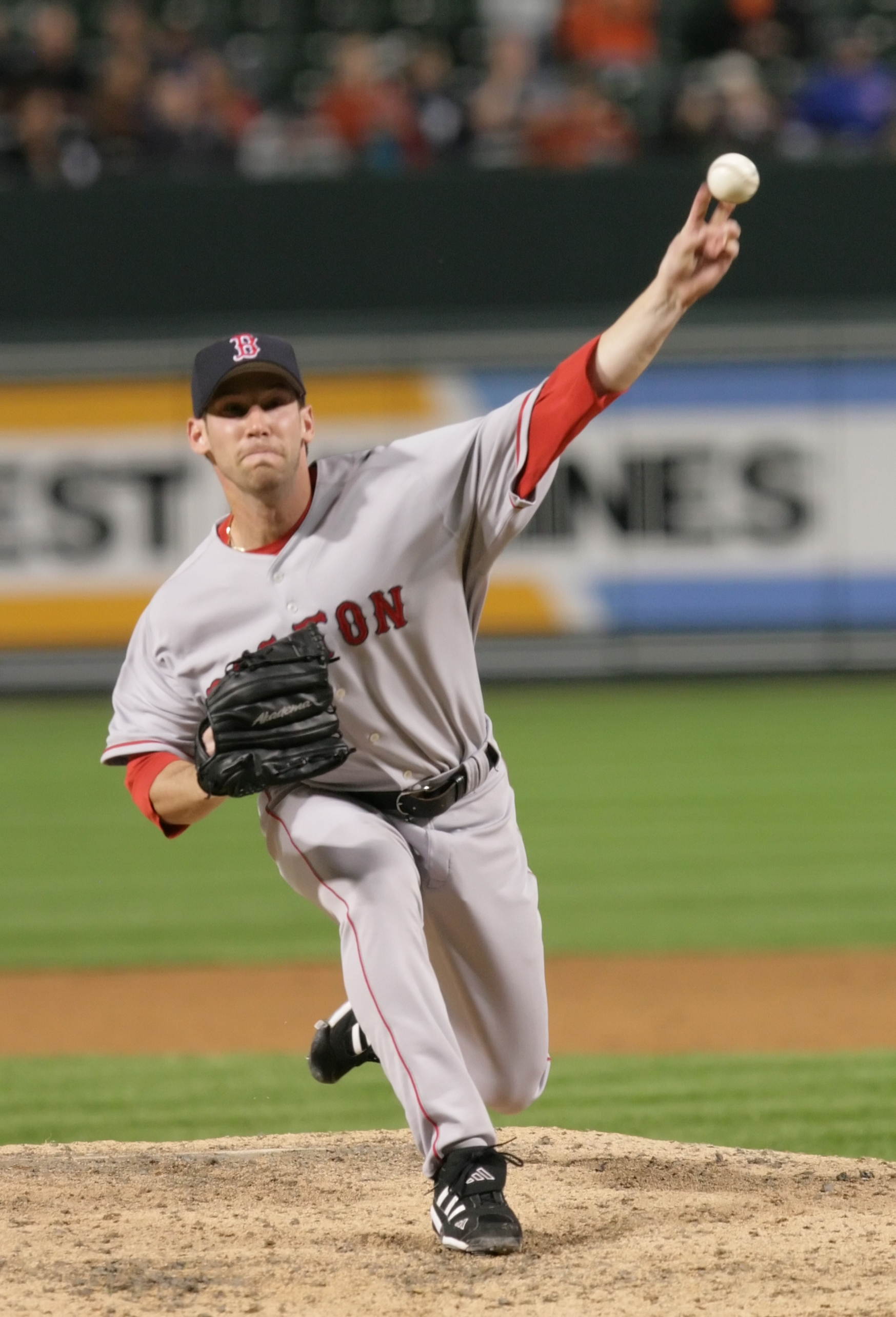
Craig Breslow

Nathan Chen

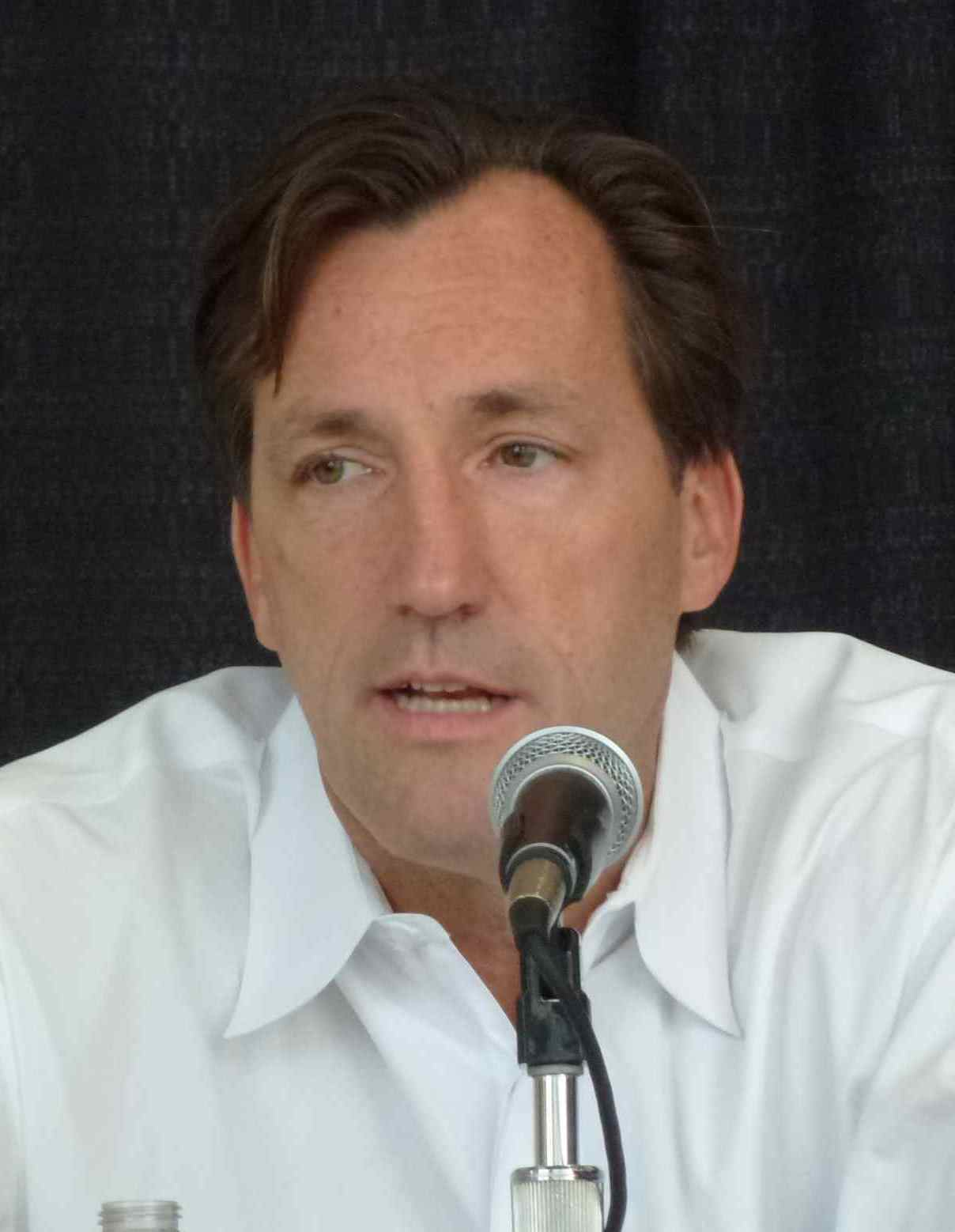
Chris Dudley

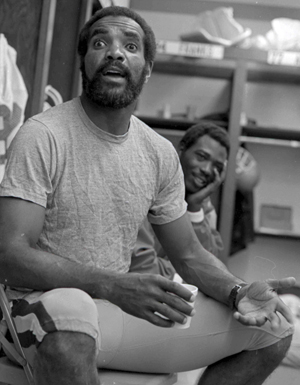
Calvin Hill

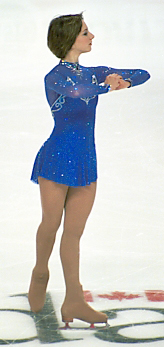
Sarah Hughes

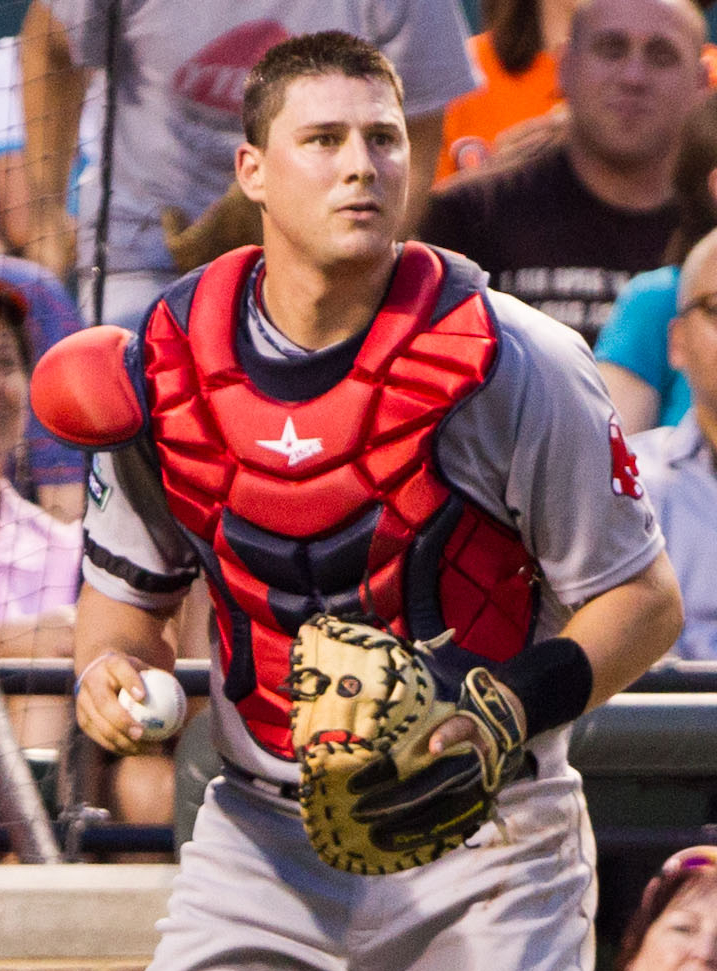
Ryan Lavarnway

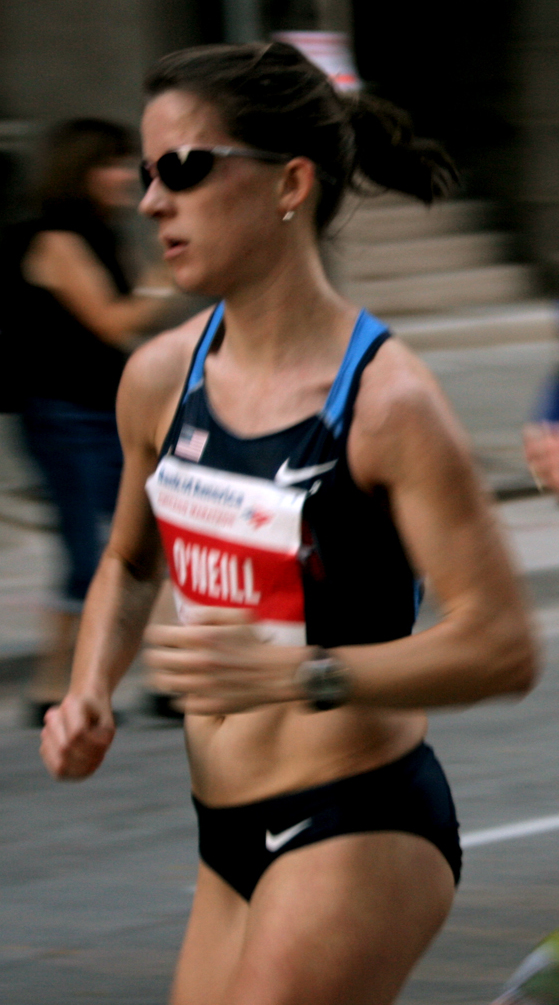
Kate O'Neill

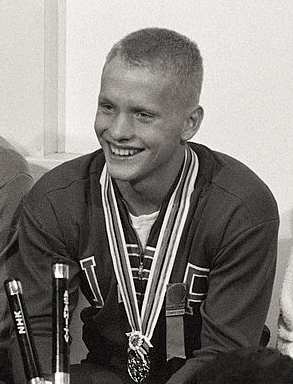
Don Schollander

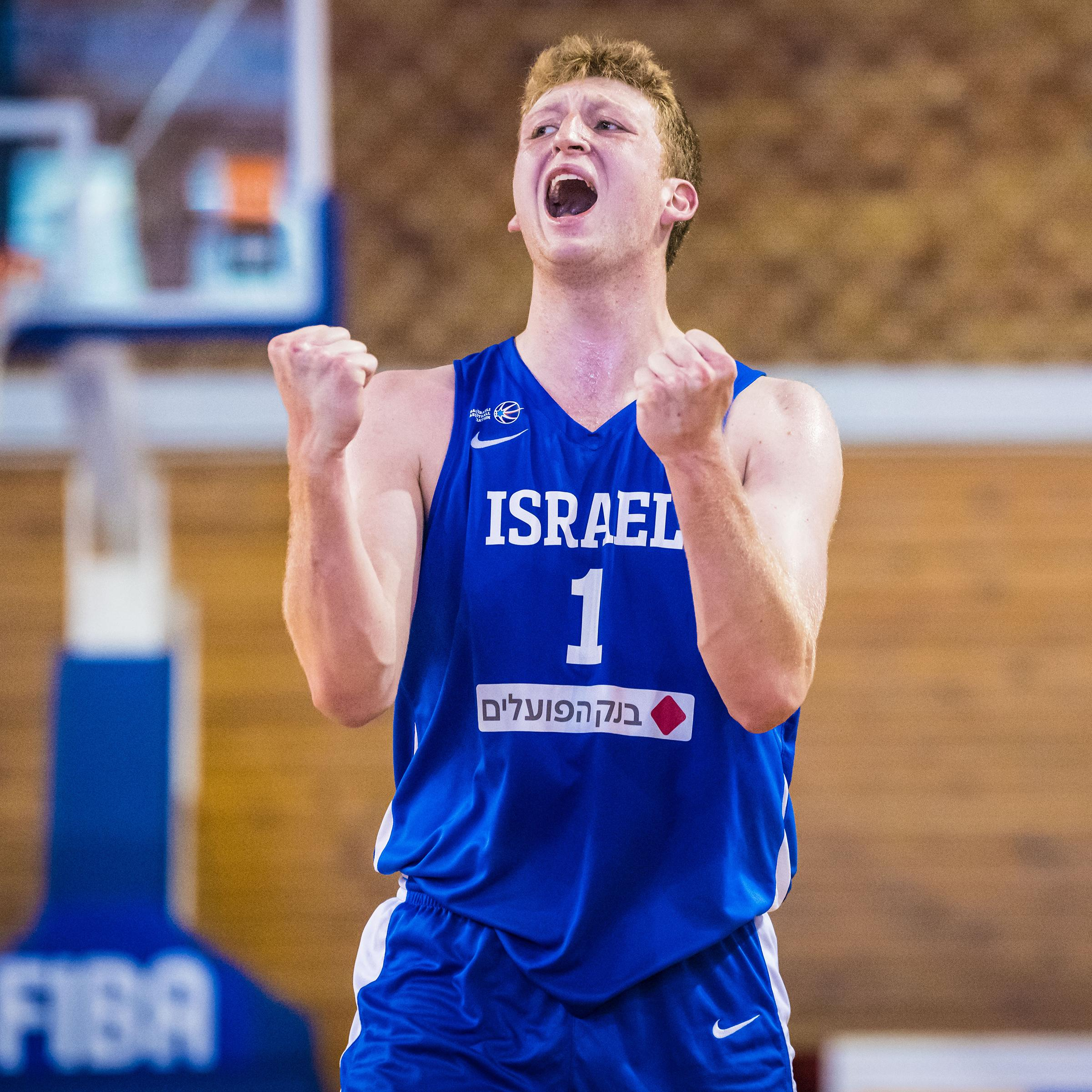
Danny Wolf

- John Acosta, Yale Football (1919–1920)
- Kiran Amegadjie (B.A. 2023), NFL player
- Paul Atkinson, professional basketball player
- Shane Bannon, former professional football player
- Susannah Beck (B.A. 1990), USA Champion distance runner
- Joel Benjamin (B.A. 1985), chess Grandmaster, 3× U.S. chess champion (1987, 1997, 2000)
- Steve Benjamin (B.A. 1978), competitive sailor; silver medalist in sailing at the 1984 Summer Olympics
- Johnny Bent, silver medalist with the American hockey team in the 1932 Winter Olympics
- Chaim Bloom (2004), chief baseball officer of the Boston Red Sox
- Craig Breslow (2002), Major League Baseball pitcher and chief baseball officer of the Boston Red Sox
- Johnny Broaca, Major League Baseball player, 1936 World Series champion
- Eric Brodkowitz, Israeli-American baseball pitcher for the Israel National Baseball Team
- Jordan Bruner (B.A. 2020), professional basketball player
- Fred Buckingham, former MLB player
- Walter Camp (B.A. 1880), the "father of American football"
- Nathan Chen (B.A. 2024), 2× Olympic champion (2022), 3× world champion (2018, 2019 and 2021), 3× Grand Prix final champion (2017–19), and 6× U.S. champion (2017–22) in figure skating
- Steve Clark (1964), swimmer, 2× Olympian
- Alan Lyle Corey Jr., polo player, 5× winner of the Monty Waterbury Cup
- Ron Darling, Major League Baseball pitcher
- Bob Davis, Major League Baseball pitcher
- Irvin Dorfman, tennis player ranked No. 15 in singles in the US in 1947, and No. 3 in doubles in the US in 1948
- Brian Dowling (B.A. 1969), quarterback
- Chris Dudley (B.A. 1987), former NBA player
- Eddie Eagan (B.A. 1921), AAU Heavyweight Boxing Champion 1919, Olympic gold medal in boxing 1920, Winter Olympics men's four-man bobsleigh gold medal 1932; only Olympian to win gold medals in Summer and Winter Olympics in different sports; New York State boxing commissioner
- Dieter Eiselen (B.A. 2020), NFL player
- Theo Epstein (B.A. 1995), became Red Sox general manager at age 28, youngest in Major League Baseball history; currently president of Baseball Operations for the Chicago Cubs
- Eva Fabian (born 1993), American-Israeli world champion swimmer
- Pete Falsey (Ph.B., 1914), Major League Baseball player
- Gary Fencik (Class of 1975, B.A. 1976), professional football player twice selected for the Pro Bowl as a defensive back for the Chicago Bears
- Robert A. Gardner (Class of 1912), 2× U.S. Amateur golf champion
- Nick Gargiulo (transferred to University of South Carolina), NFL player
- Earl G. Graves Jr. (B.A. 1984), former NBA player, all-time leading scorer in Yale's men's basketball history (3rd Ivy)
- Stephen Greenberg (B.A. 1970), former minor league player, baseball executive and sports agent, Deputy Commissioner of Baseball (1990–93); son of Hall of Fame baseball player Hank Greenberg
- Bob Griffin (M.A. '80, M.Phil. '82, Ph.D. '85), American-Israeli basketball player, and English Literature professor
- Howdy Groskloss, was oldest living former Major League Baseball player when he died aged 100 in 2006
- George Haas Jr., polo player, 3× winner of the Monty Waterbury Cup
- Chris Hetherington (B.A. 1996), NFL running back
- Chris Higgins, forward for the National Hockey League Vancouver Canucks
- Calvin Hill (B.A. 1969), football player with the NFL's Cowboys, Redskins and Browns
- Kenny Hill (B.A. 1980), football player with the NFL's Raiders, Giants and Chiefs
- Sarah Hughes (Class of 2008), gold medalist in 2002 Olympic figure skating
- Bill Hutchison, former Major League Baseball player
- Philip L. B. Iglehart, Chilean polo player
- Julian Illingworth (B.A. 2006), professional squash player, highest world ranking of no. 24
- Levi Jackson (1926–2000), first African-American elected by his teammates to captain an Ivy League football team
- Sada Jacobson (B.A. 2006), bronze medalist in 2004, and silver medalist in 2008, Olympic women's saber
- EJ Jarvis (B.A. 2023), former basketball player
- Dick Jauron (B.A. 1973), head coach of the National Football League's Buffalo Bills (2006–09)
- Eric Johnson (B.A. 2001), NFL tight end
- Jack Langer (born 1948/1949), basketball player and investment banker
- Ryan Lavarnway, major league baseball catcher (Boston Red Sox/Los Angeles Dodgers)
- Nate Lawrie (B.A. 2004), NFL tight end
- Glenn Layendecker (B.A. 1983), professional tennis player
- Mike McDaniel (B.A. 2005), head coach of the National Football League's Miami Dolphins
- Bob McKeown (B.A. 1971), Canadian Football League Grey Cup champion, award-winning journalist with CBC News, NBC and CBS
- David Meckler, professional ice hockey player
- Chuck Mercein (B.A. 1964), football player with the NFL's Giants, Packers, Redskins and Jets
- Wendell Mottley (B.A. 1964), Olympic medalist, and subsequently a government minister for Trinidad and Tobago
- Kate O'Neill (B.A. 2003), long distance runner, 2004 Summer Olympics competitor in 10,000 m
- Miye Oni, NBA player for Utah Jazz
- Winthrop Palmer, silver medalist with the American hockey team in the 1932 Winter Olympics
- John Poulakidas (B.A. 2025), professional basketball player
- Spencer Pumpelly, former MLB player
- Mike Pyle (B.A. 1960), professional football player selected for the Pro Bowl as a center for the Chicago Bears
- Frank Quinn, former MLB player
- Barney Reilly, Major League Baseball infielder
- Renée Richards, former professional tennis player, captain of the 1954 men's team as Richard Raskind
- Mike Richter (B.A. 2006), former goaltender for the New York Rangers
- Ryan Max Riley, World Cup ski racer and 2× national champion on the US Ski Team
- John Rogan, former CFL quarterback
- Jeff Rohrer (B.A. 1981), football player with the NFL's Dallas Cowboys
- Don Schollander (B.A. 1968), swimmer, 5× U.S. Olympic gold medalist: 1964, 4 gold; 1968, 1 gold, 1 silver; one of the first inductees into U.S. Olympic Hall of Fame (1983)
- Justin Sears (B.A. 2016), professional basketball player
- George C. Sherman Jr., polo player
- Frank Shorter (B.A. 1969), gold medal (1972) and silver medal (1976), Olympic marathon
- Adam Snow, polo player, played varsity hockey and lacrosse at Yale against Harvard University
- John Spagnola (B.A. 1978), football player with the NFL's Eagles, Seahawks and Packers
- Dick Tettelbach, former MLB player
- Mason Tipton (B.A. 2023), NFL player
- Jeff Van Gundy (attended Yale College for his freshman year), head coach for the NBA's New York Knicks and Houston Rockets
- Bill Vinton (B.A. 1888), former MLB player
- Ben Wanger (2019), American-Israeli baseball pitcher, Team Israel
- Anne Warner (B.A. 1976), first Yale College female undergraduate to win an Olympic medal (bronze, rowing)
- Josh West (born 1977), British-American Olympic medalist rower and Earth Sciences professor
- Danny Wolf, American-Israeli college basketball player for Yale and then for the Michigan Wolverines; drafted in the first round of the NBA draft by the Brooklyn Nets
- Joe Wood, former MLB player

== Business ==
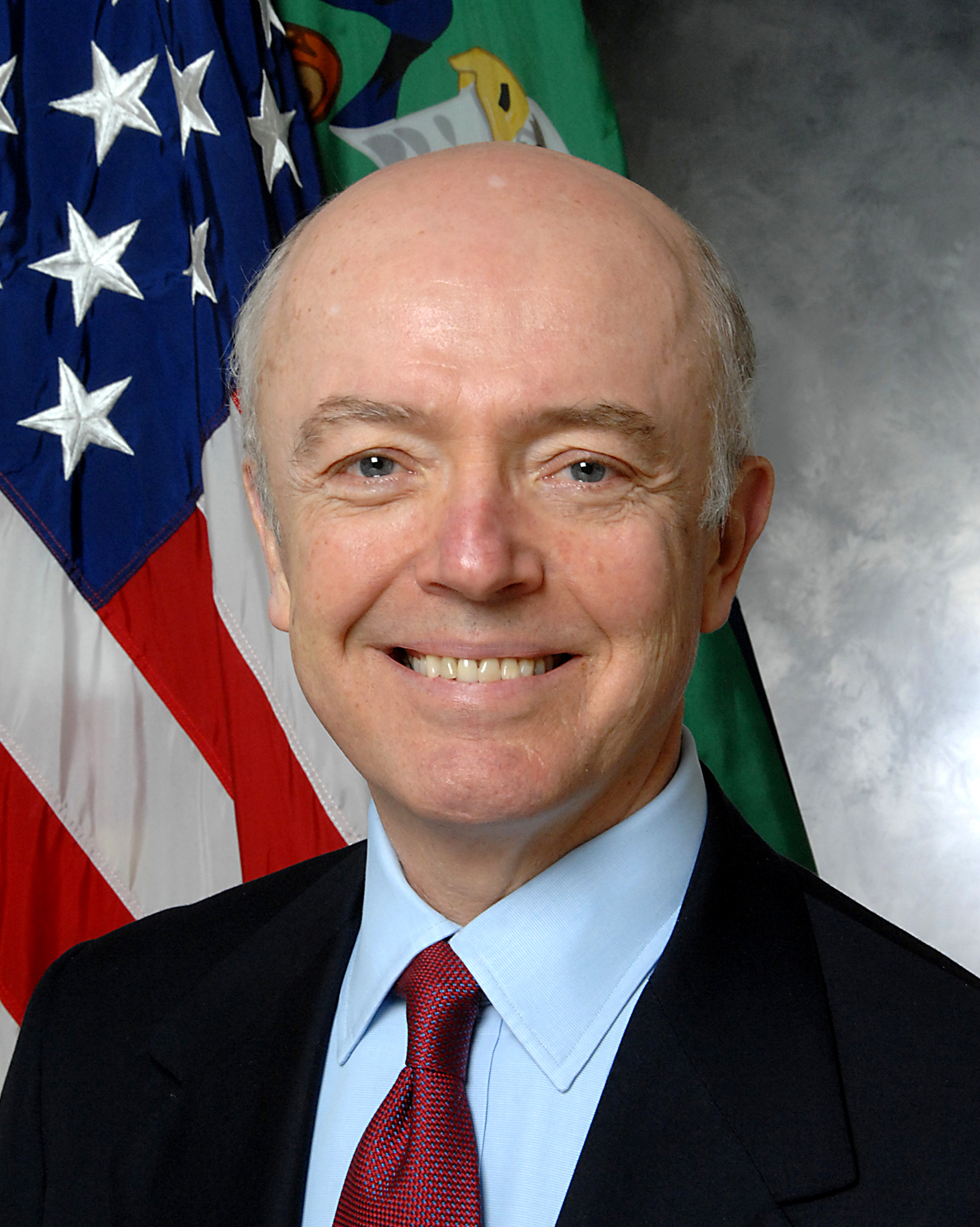
Herbert M. Allison

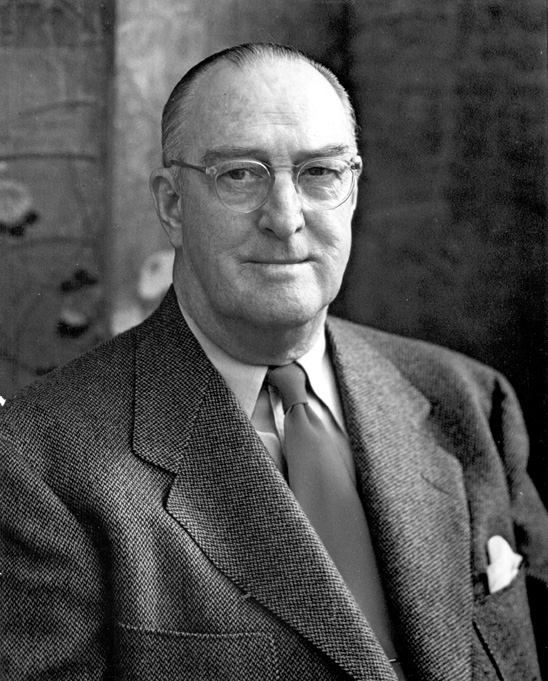
William Boeing

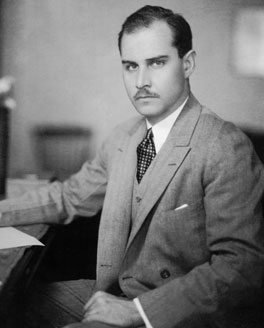
Briton Hadden

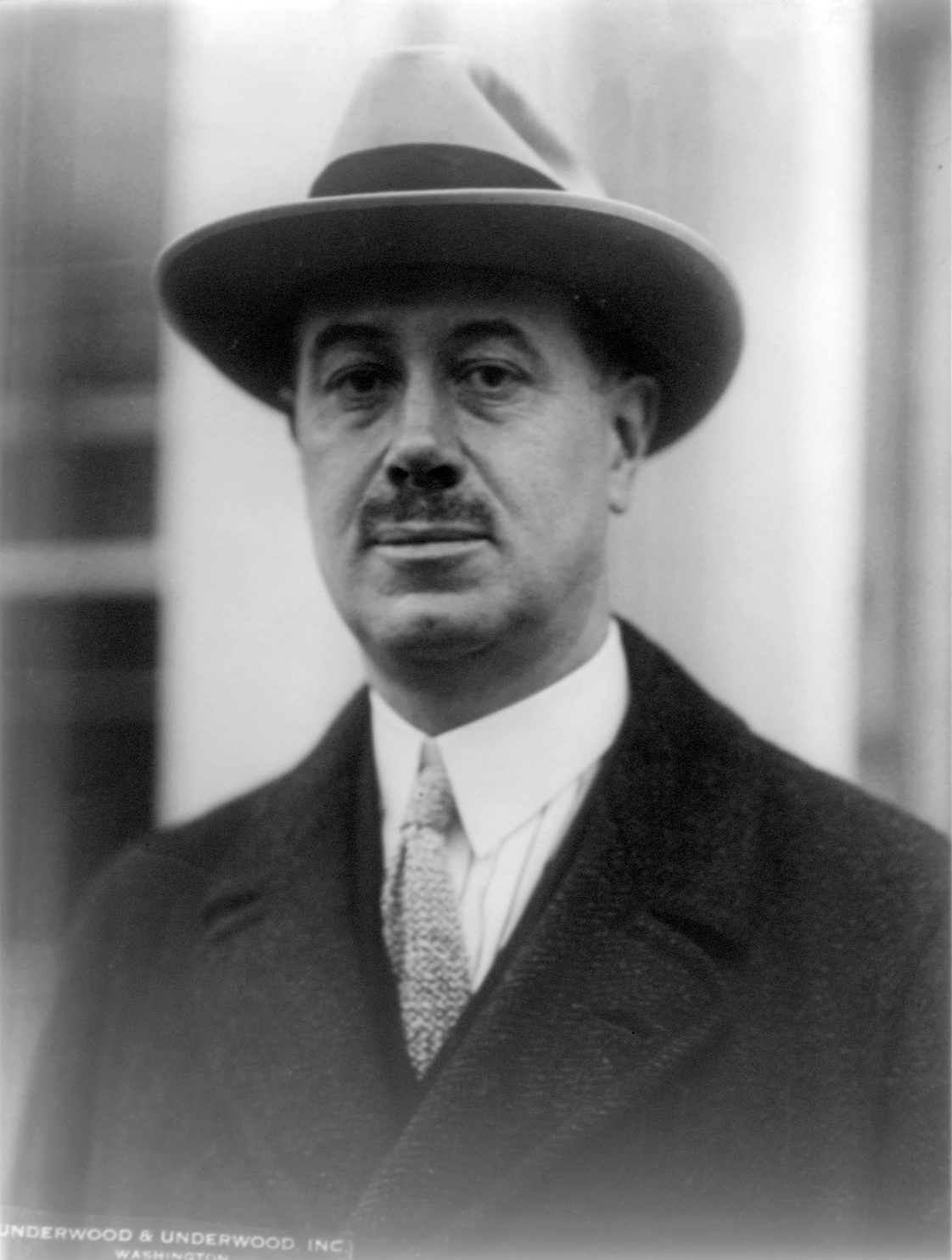
Robert McCormick

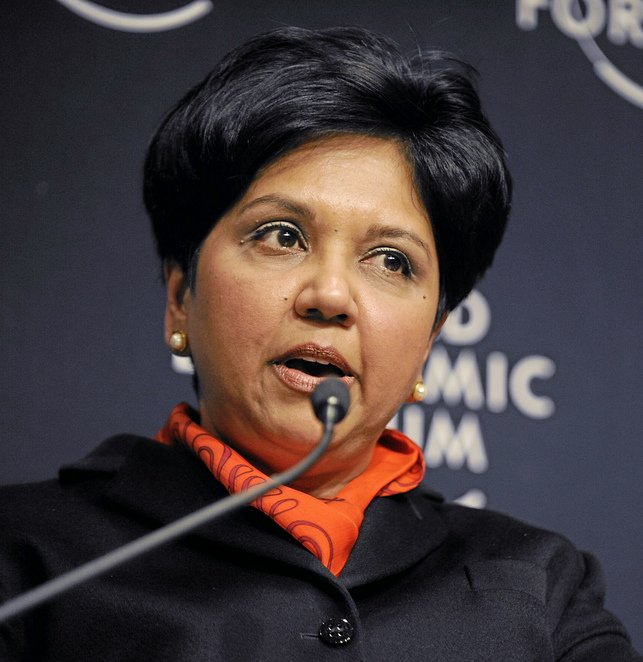
Indra Nooyi

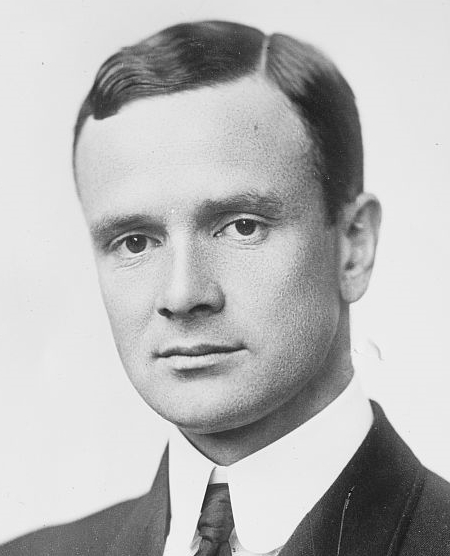
Joseph Medill Patterson

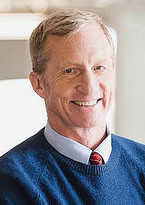
Tom Steyer

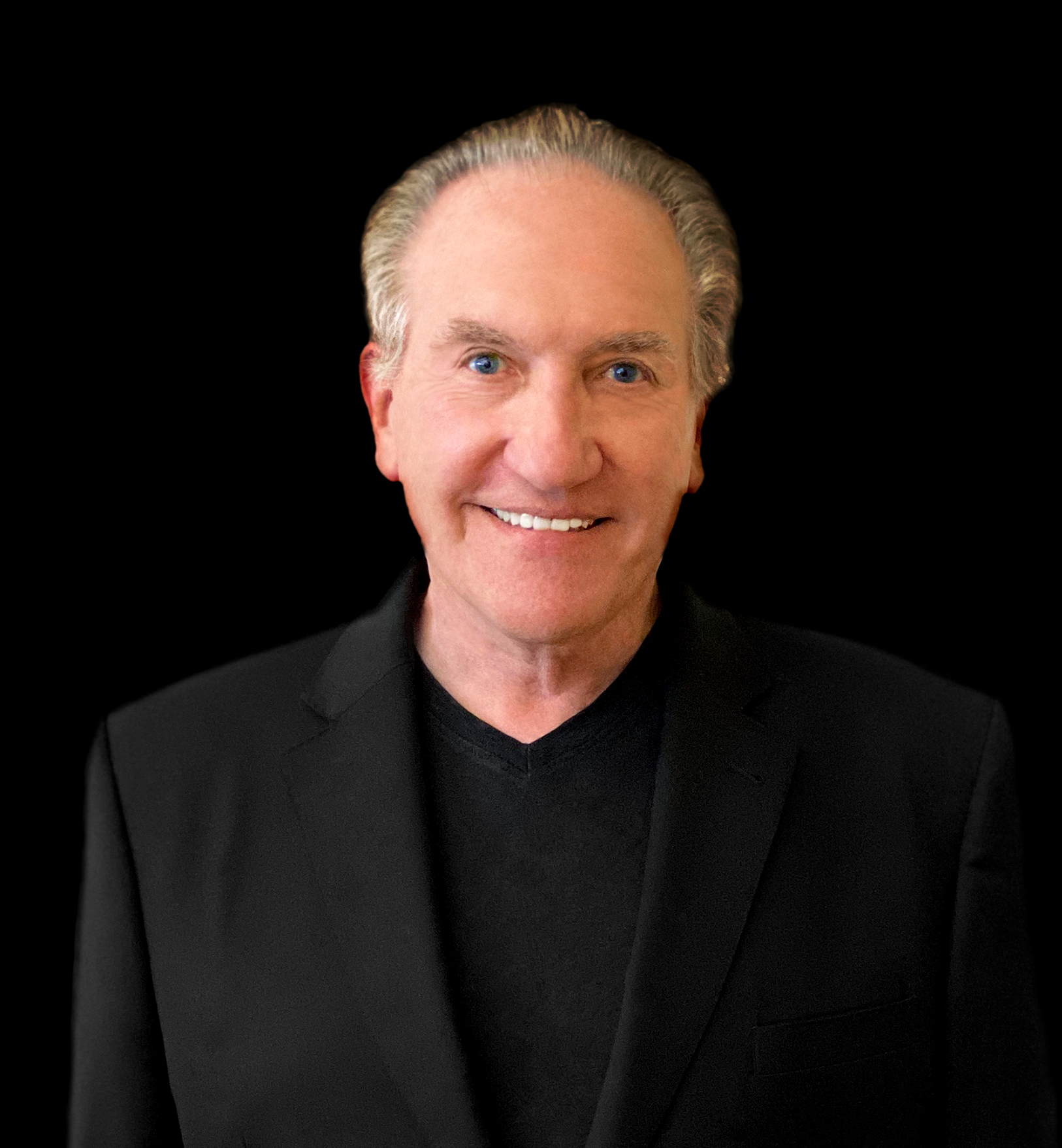
Richard Thalheimer

- John Fellows Akers (B.A. 1956), former CEO and Chairman of IBM
- Wallace M. Alexander (1869–1939), heir, corporate director, philanthropist
- Herbert M. Allison (B.A. 1965), former assistant secretary of the Treasury for Financial Stability; former chairman, president, and CEO of TIAA-CREF; former president and COO of Merrill Lynch
- Ime Archibong (B.S. 2003), business executive at Meta Platforms and board member of Capital One
- Hugh D. Auchincloss (1879), Standard Oil
- Edward P. Bass (B.A. 1968), Texas heir and billionaire
- Lee Bass (BA 1971), Fort Worth, Texas billionaire and current board member of Vanderbilt University
- Perry Richardson Bass (1914–2006), investor and philanthropist
- Robert M. Bass (B.A. 1971), former chairman, Aerion, member and former chair of the Stanford University Board of Trustees
- Sid Bass (B.A. 1965), billionaire, founder of Bass Brothers Energy
- Joshua Bekenstein (B.A. 1980), co-founder of Bain Capital
- Morris Burke Belknap (B.A. 1878), Belknap Hardware and Manufacturing Company Vice President
- Roland W. Betts (B.A. 1968), investor, film producer (Gandhi), owner of Chelsea Piers, lead owner in George W. Bush's Texas Rangers partnership
- Jeffrey Bewkes (B.A. 1974), Time Warner President and COO
- Jules Blankfein (B.A. 1921), physician & financier; founder, Physicians' Hospital, New York; uncle of Lloyd Blankfein
- William Boeing (1903), founder of the Boeing Company and United Airlines
- Hibbard Casselberry (B.S. 1916), founder and first mayor of Casselberry, Florida, real estate developer, agricultural innovator, and wartime manufacturer.
- James Chanos (B.A. 1980), billionaire hedge fund investor, founder of Kynikos Associates
- Tim Collins (M.B.A. 1982), founder and CEO, Ripplewood Holdings LLC
- S. Sloan Colt (1914), banker, philanthropist, and chairman of the Port Authority of New York and New Jersey
- Granger Kent Costikyan (1929), banker, partner of Brown Brothers Harriman & Co.
- Charles B. Finch (B.A. 1941, L.L.B. 1944), CEO and chairman of the board, Allegheny Power Systems, and political activist
- Henry Ford II (1940), chairman and CEO of the Ford Motor Company
- Ted Forstmann (B.A. 1961 (TC)), co-founder and senior partner of Forstmann Little & Company, member of the Forbes 400
- Roberto Goizueta (B.A., 1953), CEO and Chairman of the Board, The Coca-Cola Company
- Robert Greenhill (B.A. 1958), founder of M&A department at and former president of Morgan Stanley, former chairman of Smith Barney, CEO of investment banking firm Greenhill & Co.
- Briton Hadden (B.A. 1920), co-founder of Time magazine
- Peter Halloran (B.A. 1984), investment banker specializing in Russia and the surrounding region; founder and CEO of Pharos Financial Group
- Henry Holt (B.A. 1862), founder of publishing firm Henry Holt & Company, which would later merge with other companies to become Holt, Rinehart & Winston
- George H. Hume, president and CEO of Basic American Foods
- Robert S. Ingersoll (1937), former CEO and chairman, BorgWarner
- Brewster Jennings (1920), founder and president of the Socony Mobil Oil Company (Standard Oil of New York, now ExxonMobil), president of Memorial Center for Cancer and Allied Diseases and Sloan-Kettering Institute for Cancer Research
- Alexis McGill Johnson (M.A. 1995), president and CEO of Planned Parenthood
- Charles B. Johnson (B.A. 1954), chairman, Franklin Templeton Investments
- Henry Bourne Joy, president of Packard
- Clarence King (Sheffield 1862), first head of the U.S. Geological Survey
- John R. Kimberly (B.A. 1964), Henry Bower Professor Emeritus of Management at The Wharton School at University of Pennsylvania
- Herbert Kohler (B.S. 1965), billionaire, chairman and former president, Kohler Company
- Julius Kruttschnitt II (B. Phil. 1906), general manager of Mount Isa Mines
- Edward Lampert (B.A. 1984), founder and chairman, ESL Investments (hedge fund), chairman of Sears Holding Company
- William K. Lanman (B.S. Sheffield 1928), aviator, benefactor
- Henry Luce (B.A. 1920), co-founder of Time magazine
- John C. Malone (B.A. 1963), CEO of TCI, chairman of Liberty Media, and largest individual landowner in the U.S.
- Aaron Marcus (B.F.A., M.F.A. 1968), founder of Aaron Marcus and Associates, Inc. (AM+A) in 1982
- John Franklyn Mars (B.S. 1957), CEO, Mars, Incorporated
- Robert McCormick (1903), owner, president, editor and publisher of the Chicago Tribune; co-founder of Kirkland & Ellis
- Robert L. McNeil Jr. (B.S. 1936), developer of paracetamol (acetaminophen) and chairman of McNeil Laboratories
- W. James McNerney (B.A. 1971), CEO of The Boeing Company
- Roger Milliken, textiles magnate and promoter of American conservatism
- Indra Krishnamurthy Nooyi (M.P.P.M. Yale School of Management 1980), CEO and president, Pepsi
- Eric Ober (B.A. 1966), president, CBS News, Food Network
- Joseph M. Patterson (1901), media mogul, manager of the Chicago Tribune; founder and president, New York Daily News
- John Pepper (B.A. 1960), former chairman and CEO of Procter & Gamble
- James Stillman Rockefeller, president and chairman, the First National City Bank of New York; Olympic gold medal for crew, 1924
- Joel Root (1770–1847), supercargo on the sealing ship Huron, author of a journal of his voyage around the world on that ship
- Elihu Rose (B.A. 1954), real estate developer and military historian
- Joseph Rosenberg (B.A. 1903), Bank of America vice president, head of motion picture lending
- Vivek Ramaswamy (J.D. 2013), founder of Roivant Sciences, former 2024 Republican presidential candidate
- Wilbur Ross (B.A. 1959), investor, steel magnate, secretary of commerce in the Trump presidential administration
- Stacy H. Schusterman (B.A. 1985), former CEO and chairman of Samson Resources, philanthropist
- Stephen A. Schwarzman (B.A. 1969), co-founder and CEO of the Blackstone Group, member of the Forbes 400
- Daniel C. Searle (1950), heir, CEO of G. D. Searle & Company, conservative philanthropist
- Neil Shen (M.B.A. 1992), billionaire venture capitalist, founding and managing partner of HongShan Capital Group
- Timothy Shriver (B.A. 1981), Chairman and CEO of Special Olympics and member of Kennedy Family
- Chip Skowron, hedge fund portfolio manager convicted of insider trading
- Frederick W. Smith (B.A. 1966), founder and CEO, FedEx
- Charles F. Spalding (a.k.a. Chuck Spalding) (1919–2000), vice president of Lazard, political campaigner for John F. Kennedy, television writer
- Harold Stanley, founder, Morgan Stanley
- Tom Steyer, billionaire, environmentalist and founder of Farallon Capital
- John Butler Talcott (1846), industrialist and founder of the New Britain Museum of American Art
- Richard Thalheimer (B.A. 1970), founder and CEO of The Sharper Image
- John L. Thornton (M.P.P.M. Yale School of Management 1980), former president and co-COO, Goldman Sachs
- Juan Trippe (B.A. 1921), founder and CEO, Pan Am
- Frederick William Vanderbilt (Sheffield 1893), philanthropist, director of the New York Central Railroad
- Friedrich Weyerhäuser, founded Weyerhaeuser
- Cornelius Vanderbilt Whitney (1922), businessman, film producer, writer, and government official, owner of thoroughbred racehorses
- John (Jock) Hay Whitney (B.A. 1926), philanthropist and founder of J.H. Whitney & Co., first U.S. venture capital firm
- Payne Whitney (B.A. 1898)
- Elisha Wiesel (B.S. 1994), businessman; chief information officer of Goldman Sachs
- Lei Zhang (M.B.A., M.A. 2002), billionaire private equity investor, founder and chairman of Hillhouse Investment

== College founders and presidents ==
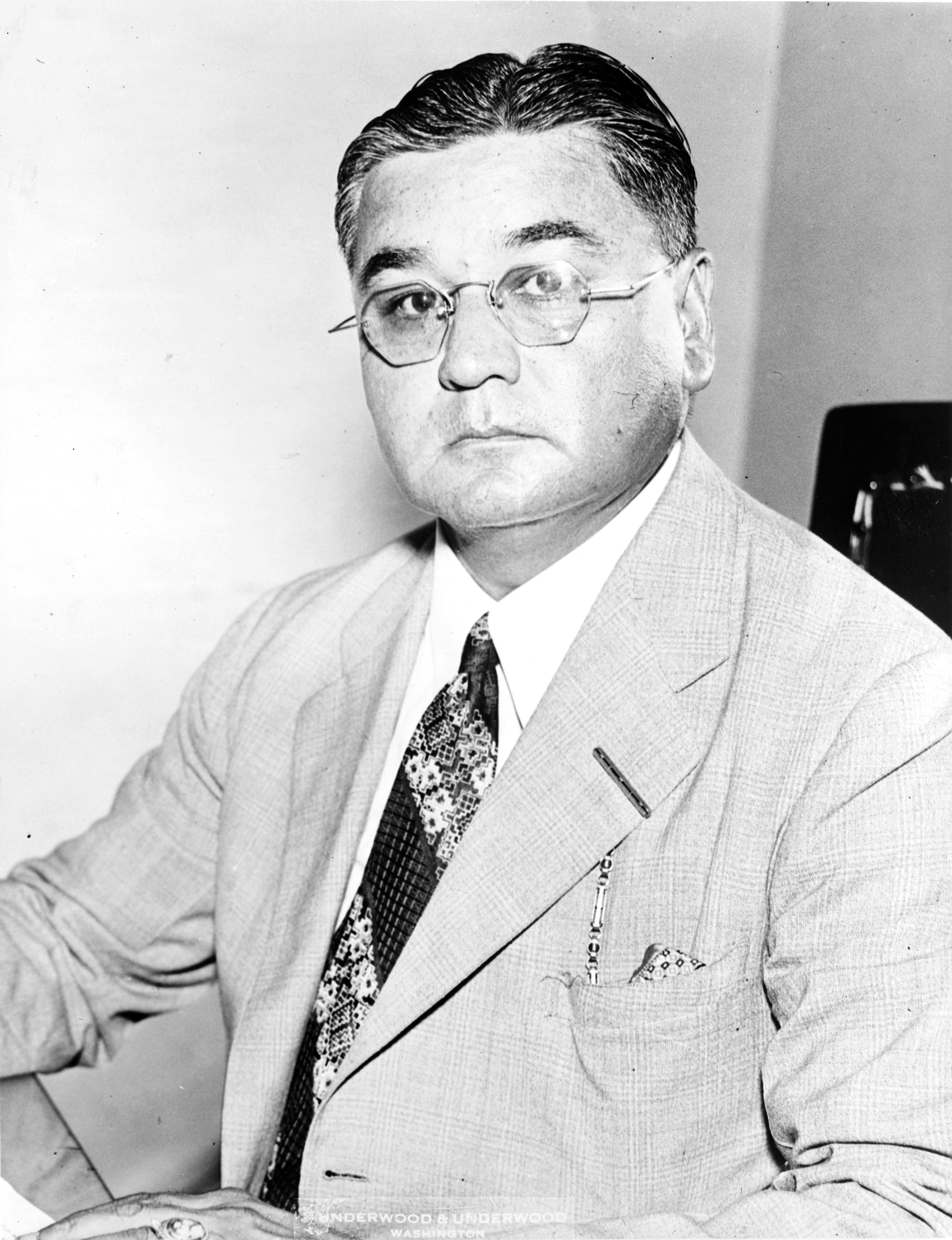
Henry Roe Cloud

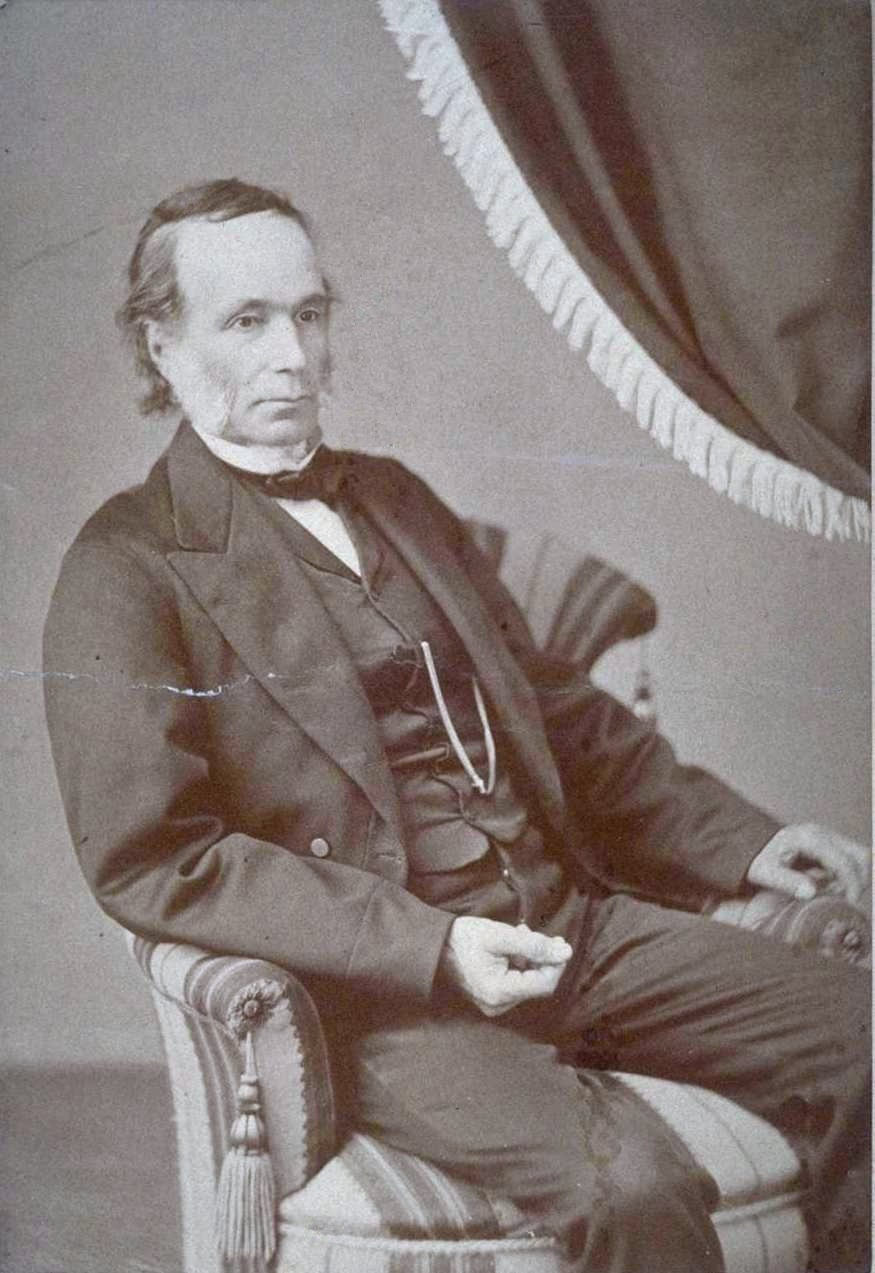
Henry Durant

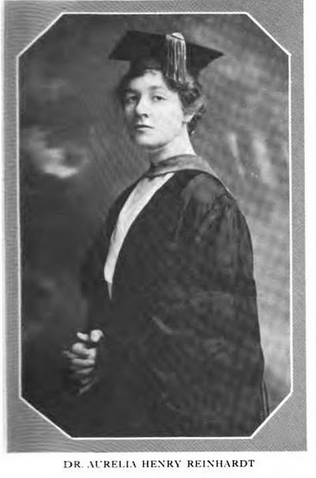
Aurelia Henry Reinhardt

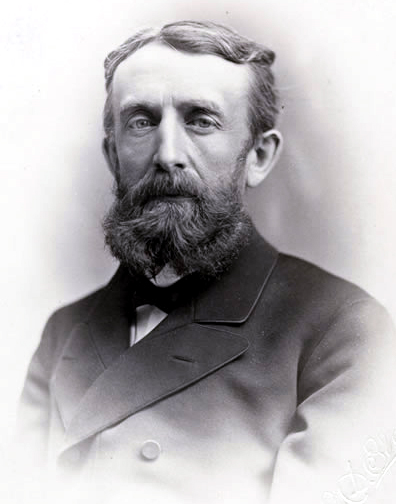
Andrew Dickson White

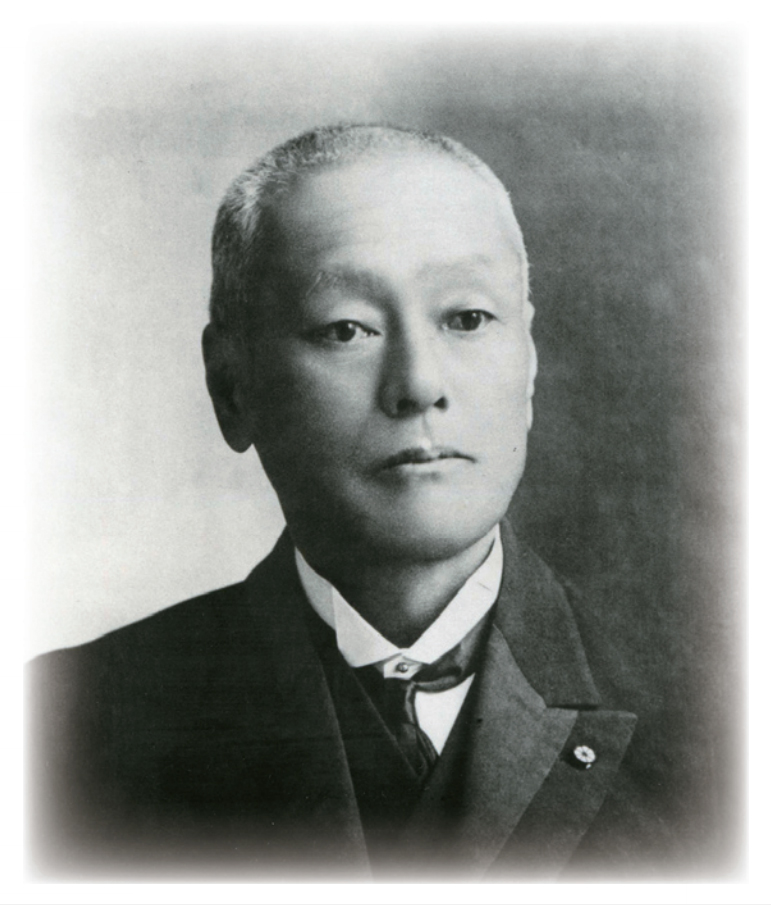
Yamakawa Kenjirō

- Frederick Barnard (B.A. 1828), mathematician, educator, president (1856–58) and chancellor (1858–61) of the University of Mississippi, president (1864–89) of Columbia University, posthumous namesake of Barnard College, active in the founding of the American Association for the Advancement of Science and the National Academy of Sciences
- Isaac K. Beckes (Ph.D. 1943), president of Vincennes University, 1950–80
- J. Seelye Bixler (Ph.D. 1924), 16th president of Colby College, 1960–79
- Richard H. Brodhead (B.A. 1968), president of Duke University
- Samuel Palmer Brooks, president of Baylor University, 1902–31
- Aaron Burr Sr. (B.A. 1735), second president of Princeton University, father of the third vice president of the United States, Aaron Burr
- Michael T. Cahill (B.A. 1993), dean and president of Brooklyn Law School
- Gerhard Casper (LL.B. 1962; honorary doctorate, 2000), ninth president of Stanford University, former provost at the University of Chicago, member of the Yale Corporation
- Daniel Chamovitz, biologist, author of What a Plant Knows, and president of Ben Gurion University of the Negev
- William Chauvenet (B.A. 1840), Chancellor of Washington University in St. Louis (1863–69)
- Carol T. Christ (Ph.D. 1970), first female chancellor of the University of California, Berkeley
- Pinkhos Churgin (1894–1957), first president of Bar-Ilan University
- Henry Roe Cloud, first full-blooded Native American to attend Yale, reformer, educator, president of Haskell Indian Nations University; first Native American member of a Yale secret society (Elihu)
- Vincent Cooke, S.J., 23rd president of Canisius College (1993–2010)
- Oscar Henry Cooper, president of Baylor University 1899–1902, and of Simmons College, now known as Hardin-Simmons University, 1902–09
- Raymond Culver, fourth president of Shimer College
- Jonathan Dickinson (B.A. 1706, when Yale was still named the Collegiate School of Connecticut), founder of the College of New Jersey, later named Princeton University
- James Johnson Duderstadt (B.E. 1964), president of the University of Michigan
- Henry Durant (B.A. 1827), first president of the University of California (Berkeley)
- Peter Tyrrell Flawn (Ph.D. 1951), geologist and former president of the University of Texas at Austin
- Edward "Tad" Foote (B.A.), former president of the University of Miami
- Thomas H. Gallaudet (B.A. 1805, M.A. 1810), educator for the deaf, co-founder and principal (1817–30) of the American School for the Deaf, namesake of Gallaudet University
- Thomas F. George (M.A. 1968, Ph.D. 1970), chemist and current chancellor of the University of Missouri-St. Louis
- Daniel Coit Gilman (B.A. 1852), second president of the University of California (Berkeley); first president of Johns Hopkins University (1876–1901); first president of the Carnegie Institution
- William Rainey Harper (Ph.D. 1874), first president of the University of Chicago
- Robert Hess (1938–1994), president of Brooklyn College
- Catharine Bond Hill (Ph.D. 1974), tenth president of Vassar College
- Elliot Hirshman (1983), eighth president of San Diego State University
- Jonathan Scott Holloway (Ph.D. 1995), 21st president of Rutgers University
- Joseph Gibson Hoyt (B.A. 1840), first chancellor of Washington University in St. Louis
- Robert M. Hutchins (B.A. 1921, LL.B 1925), president (1929–45) and chancellor (1945–51) of the University of Chicago
- John Wesley Johnson (1862), first president of the University of Oregon
- Samuel Johnson (B.A. 1714, M.A. 1717), first president of Columbia University (then known as King's College), father of William Samuel Johnson, signer of the US Constitution and third president of Columbia College (Columbia University)
- William Samuel Johnson (B.A. 1744, M.A. 1747), signer of the U.S. Constitution, third president of Columbia College (now Columbia University) and first US senator from Connecticut
- Joseph D. Kearney (1986), dean at Marquette University Law School
- Yamakawa Kenjirō (ca. 1876), founder of Kyūshū Institute of Technology
- John Kneller (M.A., 1948 and Ph.D. in French, 1950), English-American professor and fifth president of Brooklyn College
- Aptullah Kuran (B.A.1952, M.A.1954), founder and first president (1971–79) of Boğaziçi University, Istanbul
- Ted Landsmark (B.A. 1973, J.D. 1973), president of Boston Architectural College (1997–2014)
- Anthony W. Marx (B.A. 1981), president (2003–11) of Amherst College
- Mario Monti (M.Sc.), rector and then president of Bocconi University, Milan, Italy and Italian prime minister
- Douglas M. North (B.A. 1962), president of Prescott College and Alaska Pacific University; head of The Albany Academies
- G. Dennis O'Brien (B.A. 1952), former president of Bucknell University and the University of Rochester
- Helen Parkhurst (M.A. 1943), progressive educator, created the Dalton Plan, founder of The Dalton School
- Harris Pastides (MPH 1977, MPhil 1978, Ph.D. 1980), 29th president of the University of South Carolina
- Ravi Rajan (M.Mus. 2000), 4th president of California Institute of the Arts
- Aurelia Henry Reinhardt (Ph.D. 1905), president of Mills College (1916–43)
- L. Song Richardson (JD), president of Colorado College (2021–present)
- Andrew Sledd (Ph.D. 1903), first president of the University of Florida (1905–09); president of Southern University (1910–14); first Professor of New Testament Literature at Emory University's Candler School of Theology (1914–39)
- Frank Strong (Ph.D. 1897), third president of the University of Oregon and sixth chancellor of the University of Kansas
- Charles Burt Sumner (B.A. 1862), founding trustee and de facto first president of Pomona College
- Andrea Talentino (B.A.), ninth president of Augustana College
- Ambrose Tighe (B.A. 1879, M.A. 1891), co-founder of William Mitchell College of Law
- Ella King Torrey (B.A. 1980), art historian, former president of San Francisco Art Institute
- Eleazar Wheelock (B.A. 1733), founder of Dartmouth College
- Andrew Dickson White (B.A. 1853), co-founder and first president of Cornell University
- Menahem Yaari (born 1935), Israeli economist, S.A. Schonbrunn Professor of Mathematical Economics at The Hebrew University of Jerusalem, president of the Open University of Israel
- Hagit Messer Yaron (born 1953), Israeli electrical engineer, businesswoman, and president of Open University of Israel

== Film and television ==
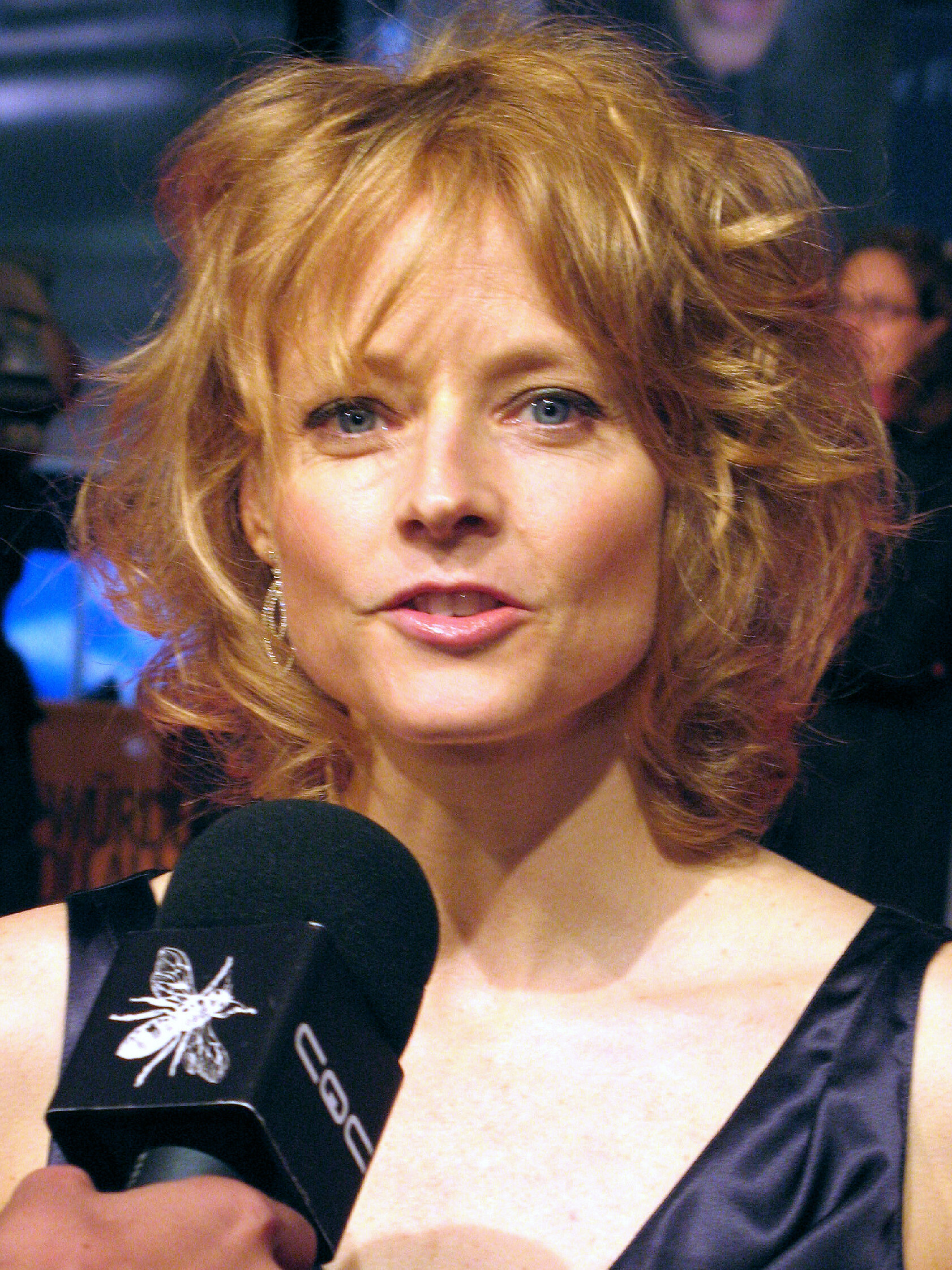
Jodie Foster

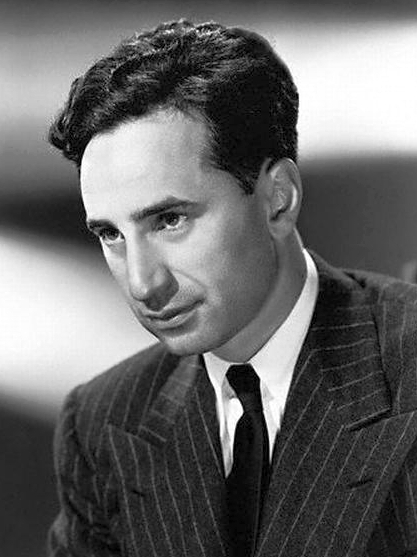
Elia Kazan

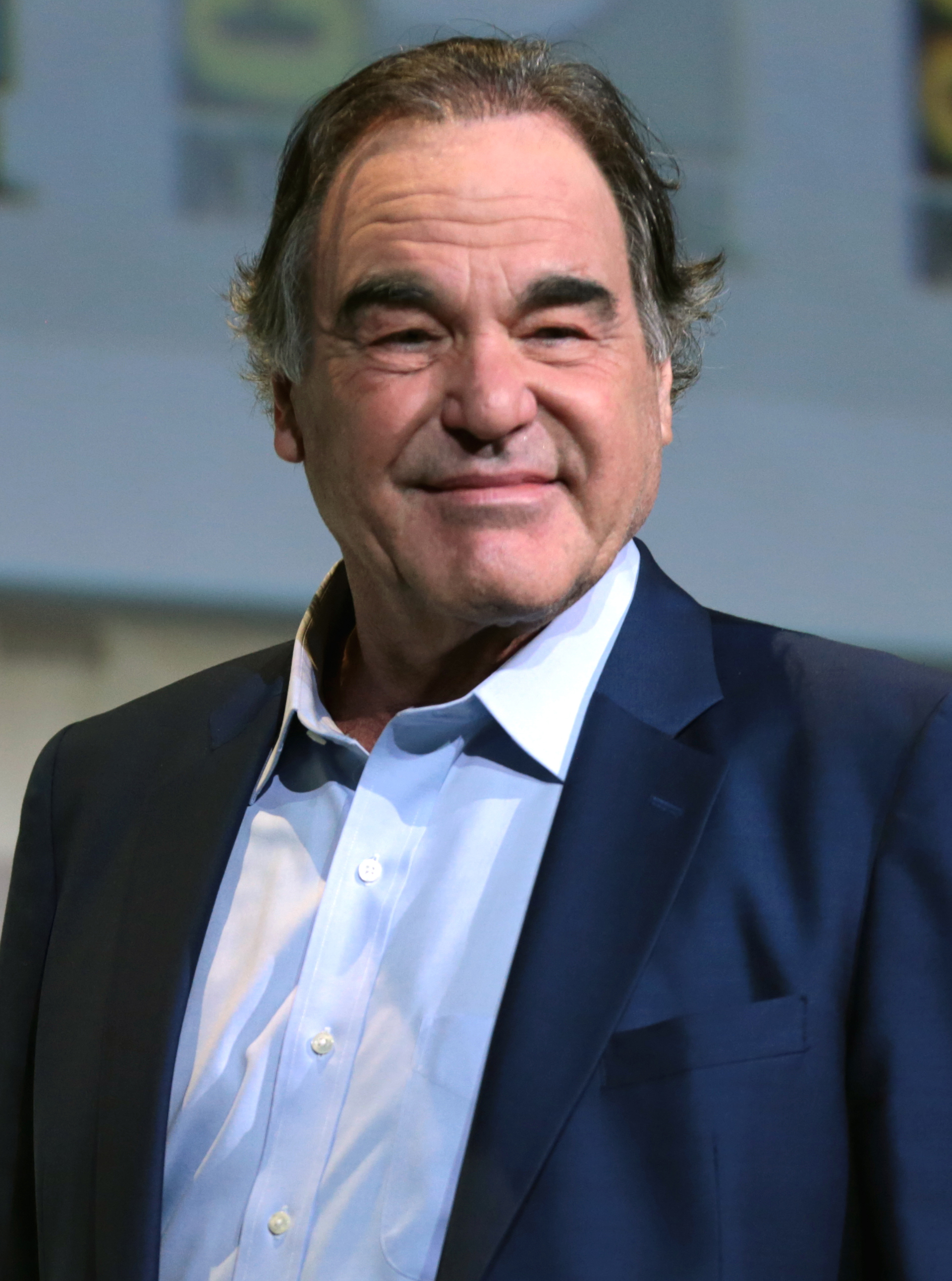
Oliver Stone

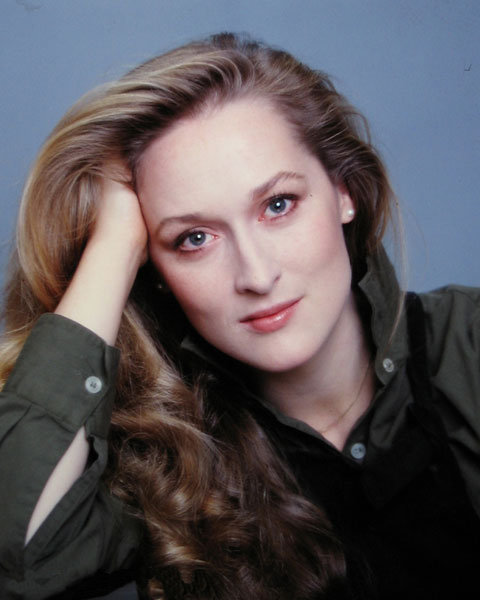
Meryl Streep

- Max Barbakow (B.A. 2011, American Studies), director of Palm Springs
- Angela Bassett (B.A. 1980 African-American Studies, MFA 1983), Academy Award-nominated actress
- Jennifer Beals (B.A. 1987 American Literature), actress, best known for Flashdance and The L Word
- Henry Bean, screenwriter/director The Believer
- Jordana Brewster (B.A. 2003), actress, plays Mia in The Fast and the Furious
- Mary Ellen Bute (studied stage lighting in the Department of Drama, 1925–26), animator and director
- Rob Campbell (MFA 1990), actor, debuted in Unforgiven
- Juliana Canfield (B.A. 2014, MFA 2017), actress, appeared in Succession and received a Tony nomination for Stereophonic
- Lee Isaac Chung, Academy Award-nominated director of Minari
- Michael Cimino (B.A. 1961, M.A. 1963), Academy Award-winning director of The Deer Hunter
- Enrico Colantoni, actor and director
- Bruce Cohen, film producer, won an Academy Award for American Beauty
- Jennifer Connelly (Class of 1992), Academy Award-winning actress
- Whitfield Cook, author, playwright and screenwriter
- Robert Curtis Brown (B.A. 1979), television, film, and stage actor
- Claire Danes (Class of 2002), actress
- Winston Duke (MFA 2013), actor
- Noah Emmerich (B.A. 1992), actor
- Jodie Foster (B.A. 1985 in literature, magna cum laude), Academy Award-winning actress and director
- James Franco, actor, comedian
- Paul Giamatti (B.A. 1989, MFA 1994), actor, starred in Sideways
- Alex Gibney, Academy Award-winning documentary-filmmaker (Enron: The Smartest Guys in the Room, 2005; Taxi to the Dark Side, 2007)
- Larry Gottheim (Ph.D. 1965), avant-garde filmmaker
- David Alan Grier, actor, comedian
- Kathryn Hahn (MFA), actress
- Brian Tyree Henry (MFA), actor
- Michael Herz, director, founder of Troma Studios
- George Hickenlooper (B.A. 1985), film director
- George Roy Hill (B.A. 1943), Academy Award-winning director
- Moses Ingram (MFA 2019), actress
- Lloyd Kaufman (B.A. 1968), director, actor, president of Troma Studios, IFTA chairman
- Elia Kazan (studied 1930–32), Academy Award-winning director
- Zoe Kazan (B.A. 2005, Theatre), film and stage actress, Elia's granddaughter
- Fran Kranz (B.A. 2004), actor
- Phil LaMarr (B.A. 1989), actor, comedian
- Adam Leipzig (B.A. 1979 in literature), film and theater producer
- Thomas F. Lennon (B.A. 1973), Academy Award-winning documentary filmmaker
- Ron Livingston (B.A. 1989), actor, best known for Office Space
- Jonathan Majors (MFA 2016), actor
- Jefferson Mays (B.A. 1987), Tony Award-winning actor
- Tom McCarthy (MFA), Academy Award-winning director, best known for Spotlight
- Frances McDormand (MFA 1982), Academy Award-winning actress
- Peter McRobbie (B.A. 1966), actor
- William Cameron Menzies (studied art in the School of Fine Arts 1913–14), production designer, art director, director
- Rebecca Miller (B.A. 1984), award-winning filmmaker and novelist
- Bill Moseley, actor
- Paul Newman (DRA 1954), Academy Award-winning actor
- Thomas Newman (B.A. 1977, M.M. 1978), film composer
- Alessandro Nivola (B.A. 1994), actor
- Edward Norton (B.A. 1991), Academy Award-nominated actor (American History X), known for Fight Club
- Lupita Nyong'o (MFA 2012), Academy Award-winning actress (12 Years A Slave)
- Alan J. Pakula (B.A. 1948), director
- Kip Pardue (B.A. 1998), actor
- D.A. Pennebaker (B.A.), documentarian and director of Dont Look Back
- Bronson Pinchot (B.A. 1981), actor
- James Ponsoldt (B.A.), director
- Vincent Price (B.A. 1933, History & English), actor
- Sarah Rafferty (MFA), actress
- Da'Vine Joy Randolph (M.F.A. 2011), Academy Award-winning actress (The Holdovers)
- Ira Sachs (B.A. 1988), director
- Michael Sarnoski (B.A. 2010), director
- Liev Schreiber (MFA 1992), actor
- Robert Simonds (B.A. 1985 in Philosophy, summa cum laude), film producer, best known for Happy Gilmore, Cheaper by the Dozen, and The Wedding Singer; also the founder and chairman of STX Entertainment
- Josh Singer (B.A.), screenwriter, best known for Spotlight
- Gene Siskel (B.A. 1967), movie critic
- Todd Solondz (B.A. 1981), director, Welcome to the Dollhouse and Happiness
- Oliver Stone (Class of 1968), Academy Award-winning director
- Meryl Streep (MFA, 1975), Academy Award-winning actress
- Jeremy Strong (B.A.), actor
- Ted Tally (B.A.), Academy Award-winning screenwriter
- John Turturro (MFA 1983), actor
- Sam Waterston (B.A. 1961), actor
- Sigourney Weaver (MFA 1974), actress
- Jon Weinbach (B.A. 1998), director, writer, producer
- Joe Weisberg (B.A. 1987), creator and showrunner of The Americans
- Sam Weisman (B.A. 1969), director, producer, actor
- Jennifer Westfeldt (B.A. 1991), actress, screenwriter (Kissing Jessica Stein)
- James Whitmore, actor
- Douglas Wick (B.A. 1976), film producer
- Allison Williams (B.A. 2010), actress (Get Out), comedian, singer
- Rob Wright (B.A.), producer/writer
- Jessica Yu (B.A. 1987), Academy Award-winning film director

== Inventors and innovators ==
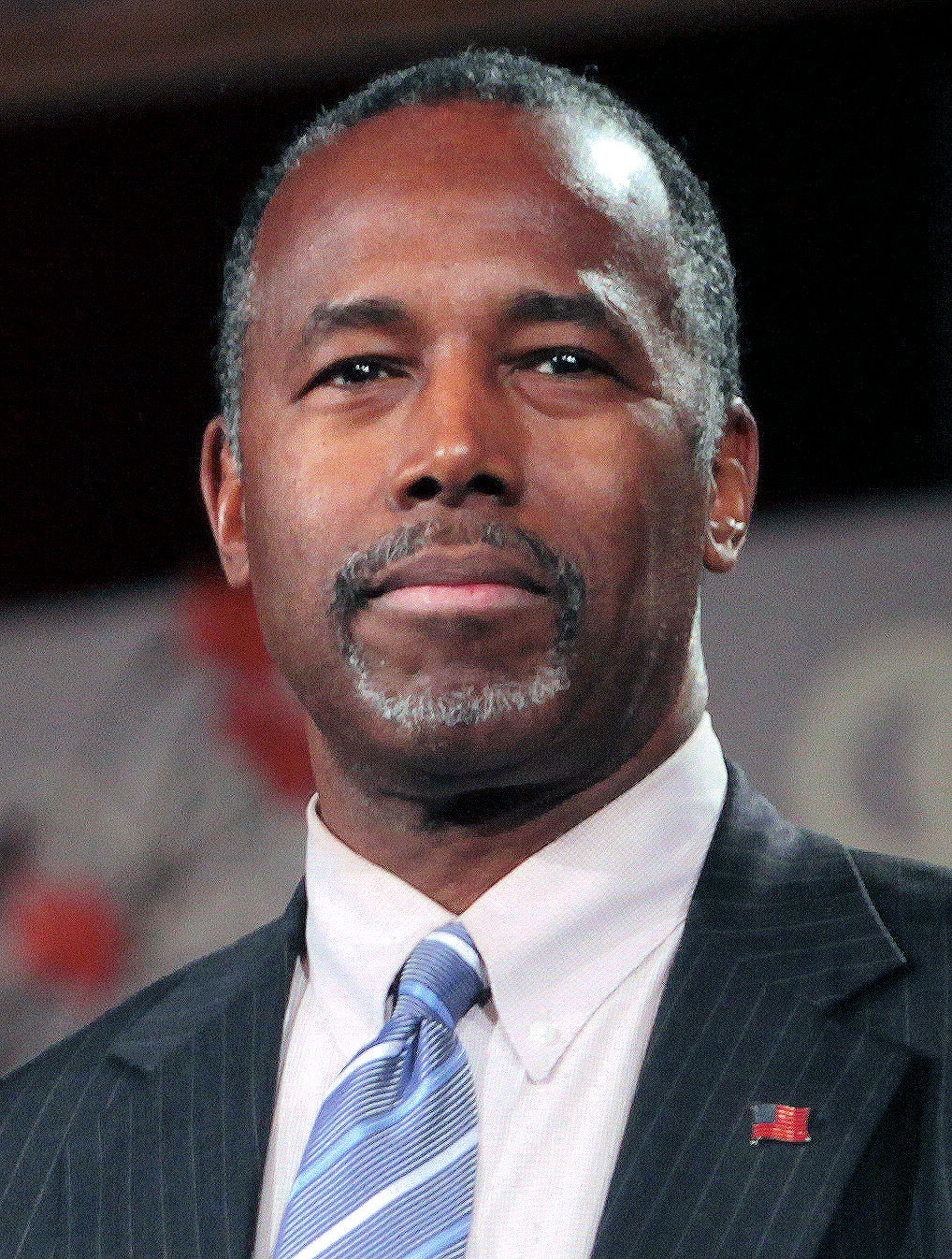
Ben Carson

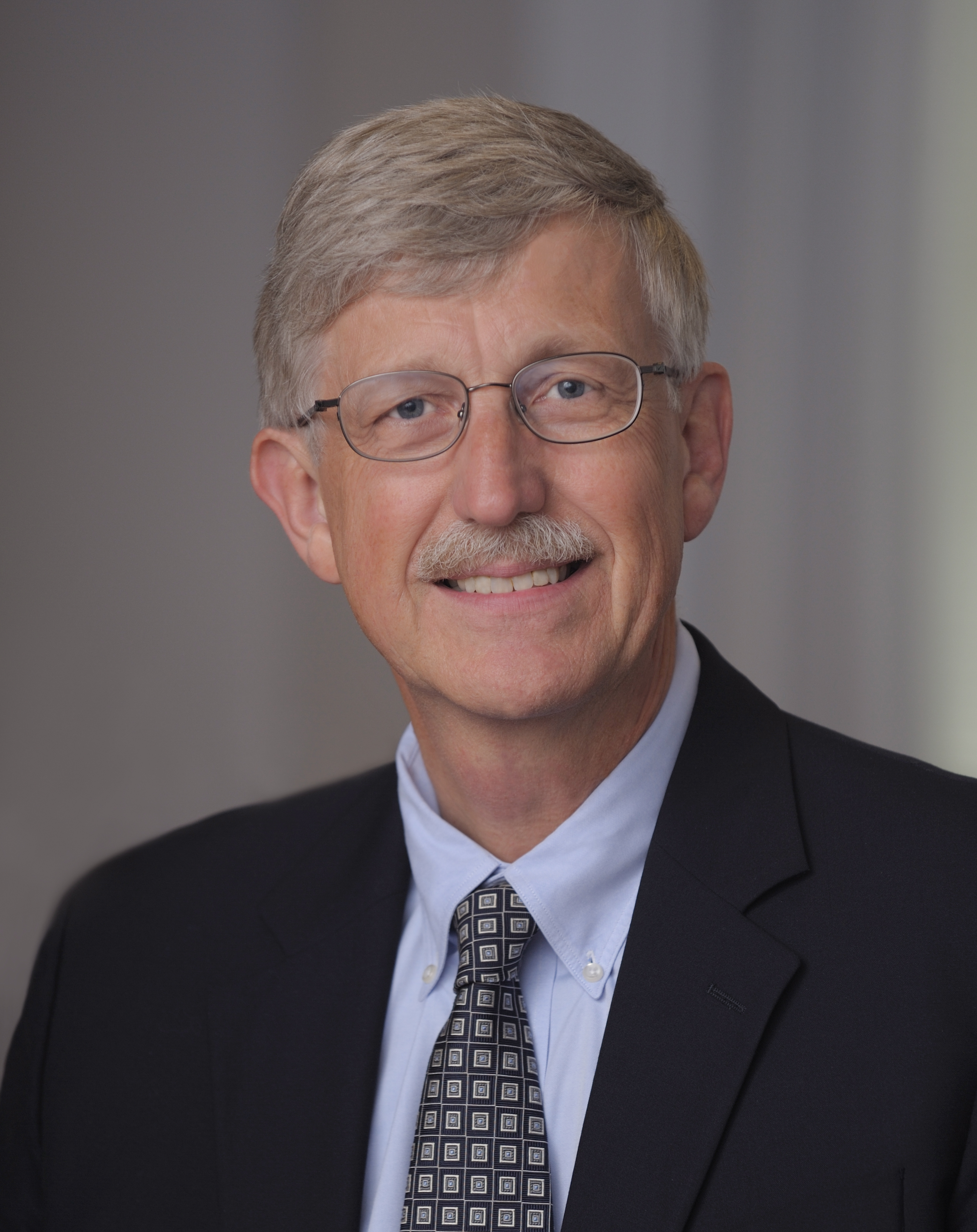
Francis Collins

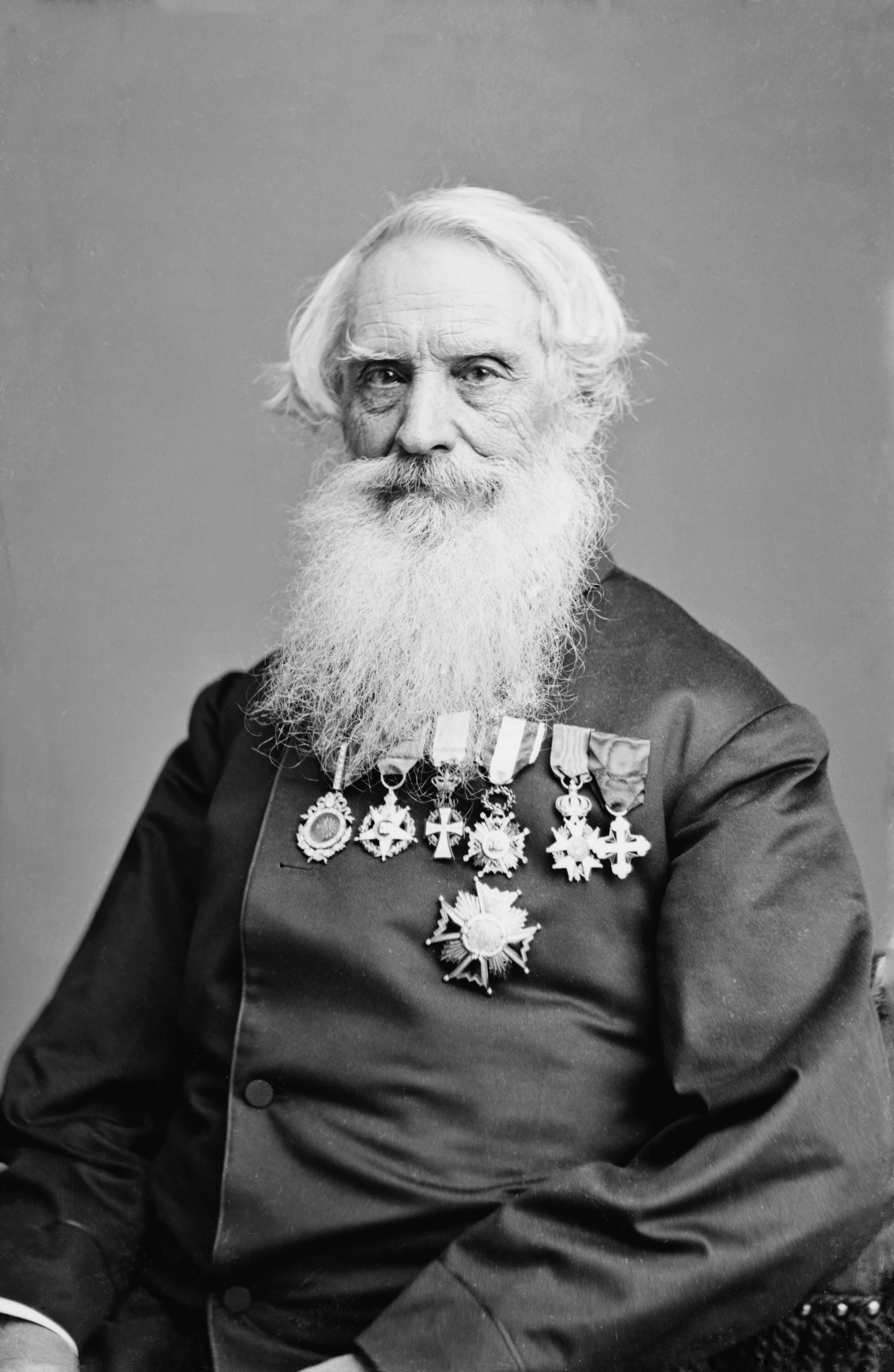
Samuel Morse

- Joseph P. Allen (Ph.D. 1965), NASA astronaut with two STS missions experience
- Herbert Boyer (1963–66), co-founder of Genentech; genetic engineering pioneer
- David Bushnell (ca. 1776), inventor of the screw propeller, submarine, naval mine, and time bomb
- Ben Carson (B.A. 1973), pediatric neurosurgeon, first surgeon to successfully separate twins conjoined at the back of the head
- Francis S. Collins (Ph.D. 1974), director, Human Genome Project
- Harry B. Combs (B.S. 1935, Sheffield Scientific School), aviation pioneer
- Harvey Williams Cushing (B.A.), pioneer of modern brain surgery and considered by many the greatest neurosurgeon of the 20th century
- Lee De Forest (B.S. 1896, Ph.D. 1899), inventor of the triode
- Helen Flanders Dunbar (M.D. 1930), important early figure in U.S. psychosomatic medicine
- Henry Leavitt Ellsworth (B.A. 1810), first commissioner of United States Patent Office, founder of United States Department of Agriculture
- Eric Fossum (Ph.D. 1984), inventor of CMOS image sensor
- J. Willard Gibbs (1858, Ph.D. 1863), mathematician, physical chemist, thermodynamicist, known for Gibbs phenomenon
- Grace Hopper (M.A. 1930, Ph.D. 1934), inventor of COBOL programming language
- Maurice Karnaugh (B.Sc. 1949, M.Sc. 1950, Ph.D. 1952), developer of Karnaugh map
- L. L. Langstroth (1831), apiarist, clergyman, and teacher, considered to be the father of American beekeeping; namesake and creator of the Langstroth hive
- Paul B. MacCready (1947), "Engineer of the Century", won the Kremer prize for first human-powered flying machine (the Gossamer Condor); pioneer in solar powered flight; founder of AeroVironment
- Aaron Marcus (B.F.A., M.F.A. 1968), the first graphic designer in the world to work with computer graphics
- Elmer McCollum (Ph.D. 1904), biochemist, co-discovered vitamins A, B, and D
- Warren Sturgis McCulloch (B.A. 1921), cybernetics pioneer, created the first computational models for studying the brain
- Samuel F. B. Morse (1810), telegraph pioneer, inventor of Morse code
- Harry Nyquist (Ph.D. 1917), engineer known for the Nyquist theorem
- John Ousterhout (B.S. 1975), creator of the Tcl programming language
- Ronald Rivest (B.S. 1969), computer scientist, the "R" in the RSA cryptography, 2002 Turing Award recipient
- George B. Selden, awarded the first United States patent for an automobile in 1895
- Benjamin Silliman (1779–1864), early chemist and science educator; one of the first professors of science at Yale College; the first person to distill petroleum; a founder of the American Journal of Science, the oldest scientific journal in the United States
- Benjamin Silliman Jr., professor of chemistry at Yale University, instrumental in developing the oil industry
- Benjamin Spock (B.A. 1925), child psychology guru
- Eli Whitney (1792), inventor of the cotton gin

== Life sciences and medicine ==
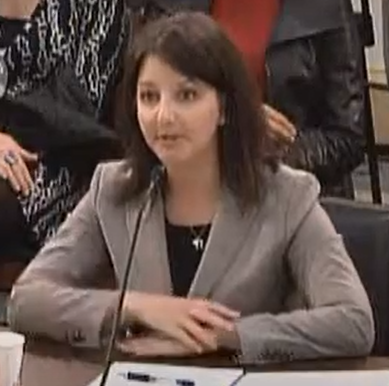
Mandy Cohen

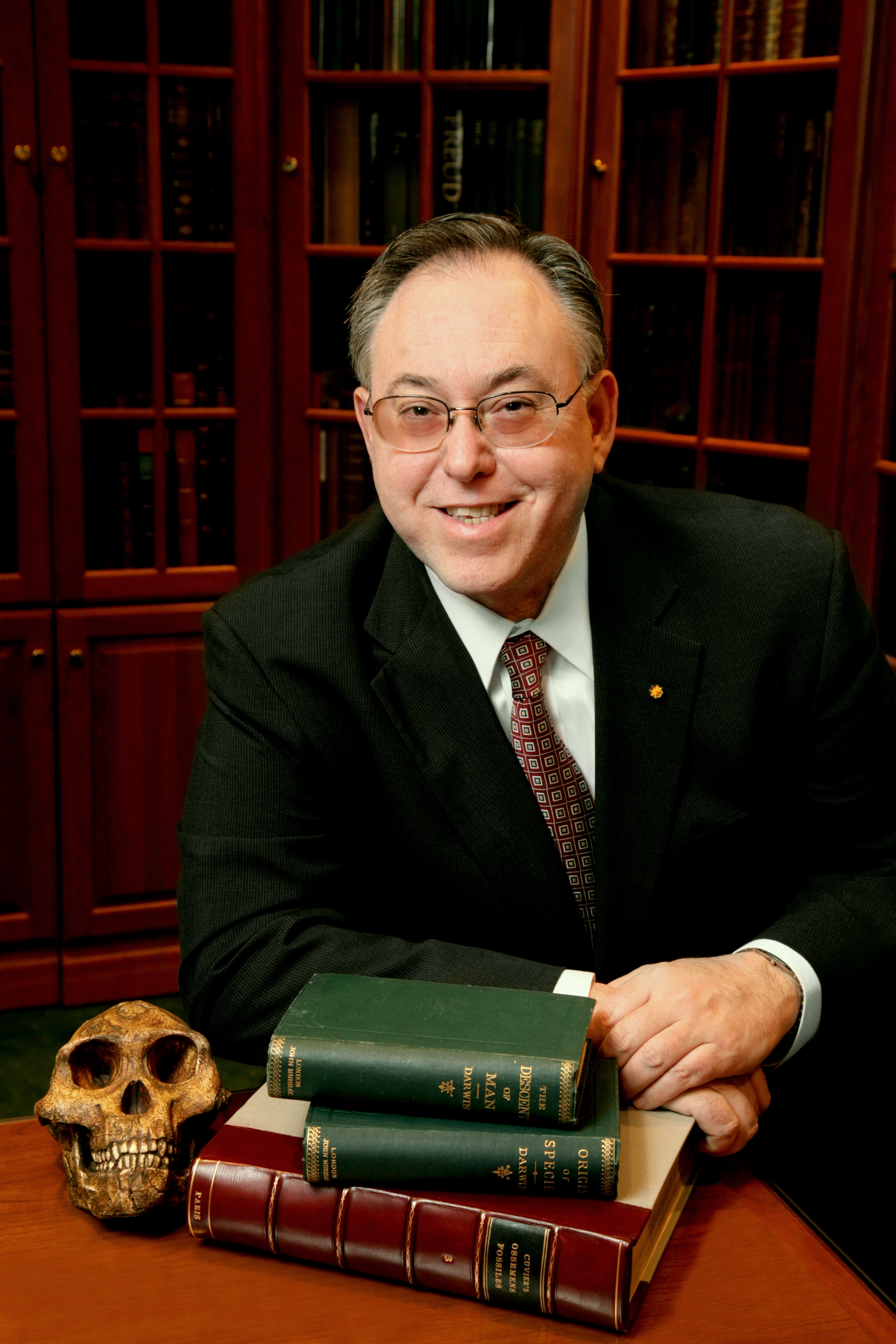
Jeffrey Laitman

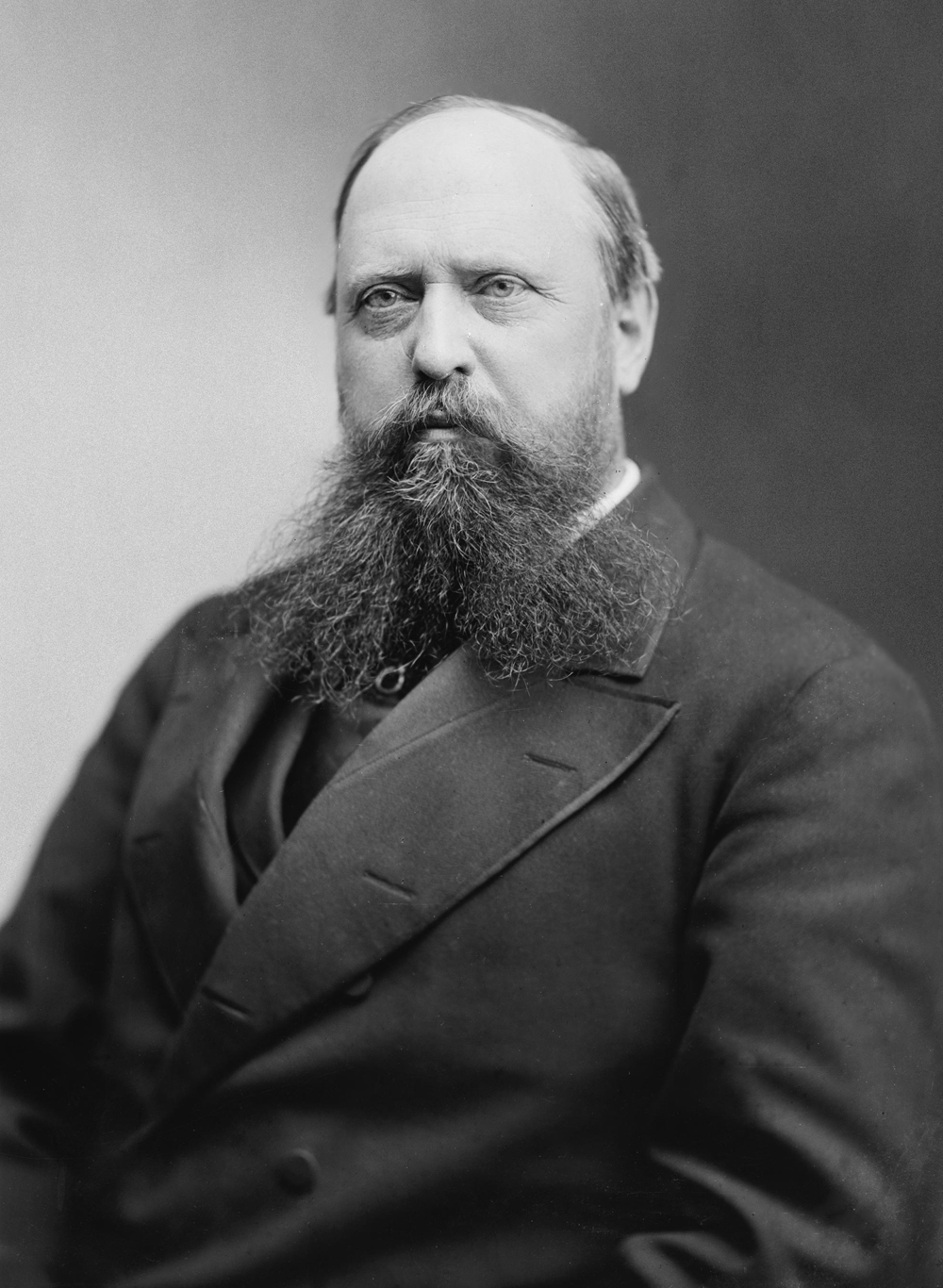
Othniel Charles Marsh

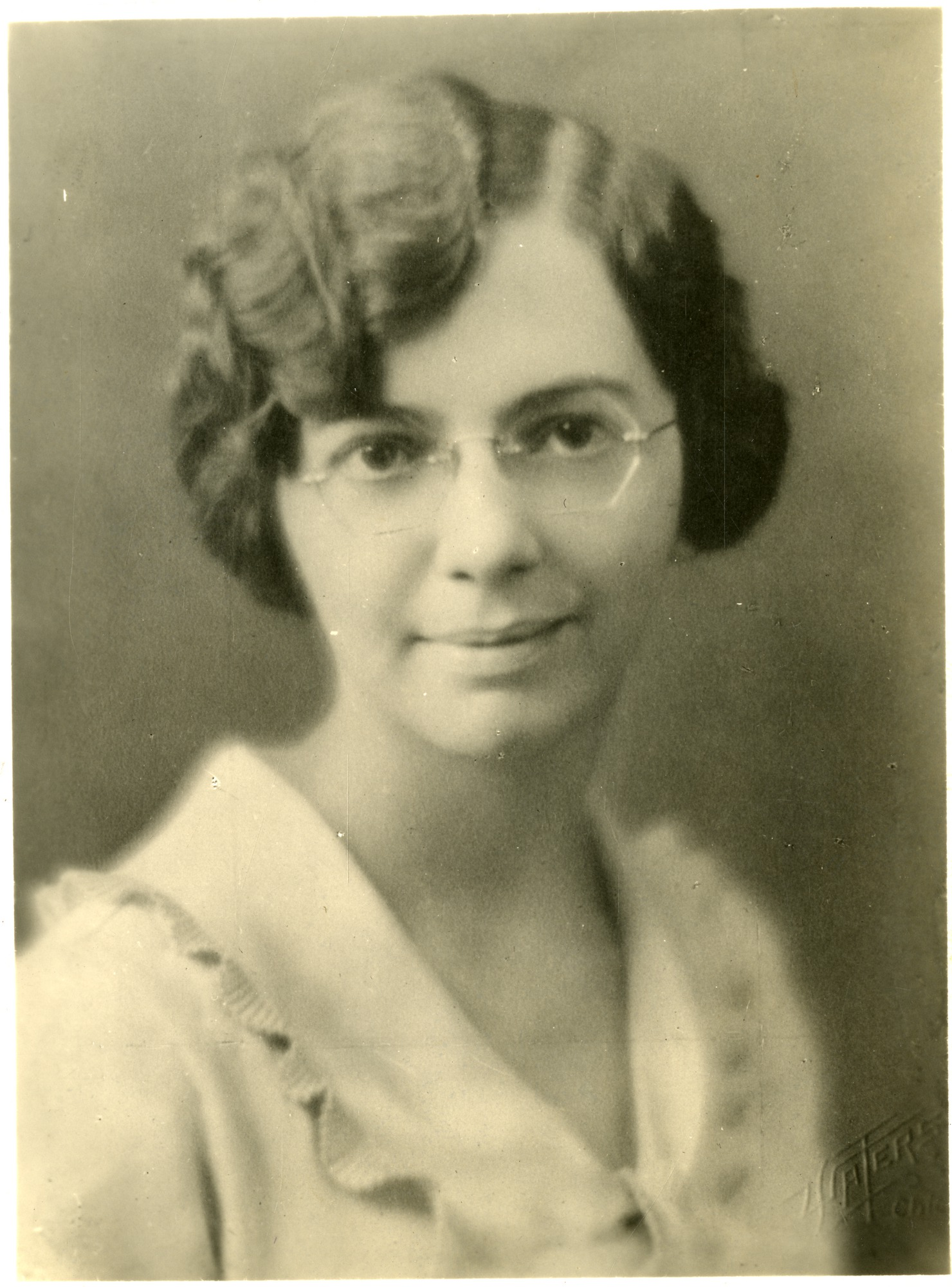
Florence Seibert

- A. Elizabeth Adams (Ph.D. 1926), professor of Zoology at Mount Holyoke College
- Christina Agapakis (B.S. 2006), synthetic biologist and Creative Director of Ginkgo Bioworks
- Michael L.J. Apuzzo (B.A. 1961), academic neurosurgeon, surgical pioneer, Editor and educator; professor of Neurological Surgery, Radiation Oncology, Biology and Physics, University of Southern California; Distinguished Adjunct Professor of Neurosurgery, Yale
- Shy Arkin (Ph.D. 1966 in Cell Biology), Israeli Professor of Structural Biochemistry at The Hebrew University of Jerusalem
- George Alfred Baitsell (M.A. 1909, Ph.D. 1914), biologist, official of the American Association for the Advancement of Science
- Oxiris Barbot, commissioner of health of the City of New York
- Aaron Beck (M.D. 1946), "father of cognitive behavioral therapy"; founder of the Beck Institute for Cognitive Behavior Therapy at the University of Pennsylvania; winner of the Lasker Award
- Jules Blankfein, Class of 1921, physician and financier; founder of Physicians' Hospital, New York; uncle of Lloyd Blankfein
- Katharine Jeanette Bush (Ph.D. 1901), zoologist, first woman to receive a Ph.D. in sciences from Yale
- Alice Chen (B.S. 2001), founding member and former director of Doctors for America
- Mandy Cohen (M.D. 2005), physician, secretary of the North Carolina Department of Health and Human Services, director of the U.S. Centers for Disease Control and Prevention
- Lila Davachi, (Ph.D. 1999), cognitive neuroscientist, professor of psychology at Yale University
- Robley Dunglison (1798–1869), personal physician to Thomas Jefferson, chair of medicine at University of Maryland and Jefferson Medical College
- John Elefteriades (M.D. 1976), cardiac surgeon, professor at Yale School of Medicine
- Margaret Flinter (M.S.N. 1980), nurse practitioner; senior vice president and clinical director of Community Health Center, Inc.; developer of national postgraduate nurse practitioner residency model
- Nathan Havill (M.S. 2003, Ph.D. 2006), entomologist and evolutionary biologist
- Rani Hoff (MPH and PhD), Yale professor of psychiatry
- Peter Hotez (B.A. 1980), dean of the National School of Tropical Medicine and Professor of Pediatrics and Molecular Virology & Microbiology at Baylor College of Medicine
- Howard A. Howe (B.A. 1925), polio researcher at Johns Hopkins University School of Medicine
- Allyn Merriam Hungerford (M.D. 1839), prominent Connecticut physician, legislator and judge
- Ebenezer Kingsbury Hunt (B.A. 1833), president of the Connecticut State Medical Society, director of the Retreat for the Insane
- Howard Koh (B.A. 1973, M.D. 1977), professor, Harvard School of Public Health
- Jeffrey Laitman (Ph.D 1977), anatomist and physical anthropologist, Distinguished Professor of the Mount Sinai School of Medicine, president-elect of the American Association of Anatomists
- Arthur Lander, B.A., developmental biologist at University of California, Irvine
- Aldo Leopold (master's degree in Forestry, 1909), pioneer in the field of wildlife management at the University of Wisconsin–Madison, author of A Sand County Almanac
- Othniel Charles Marsh (1862), preeminent paleontologist, discovered numerous dinosaur species
- Harold J. Morowitz (B.S. 1947, M.S. 1950, Ph.D. 1951), professor of biology and natural philosophy at George Mason University
- Vivek Murthy (MD 2003, MBA 2003), vice admiral in the United States Public Health Service Commissioned Corps, 19th and 21st surgeon general of the United States
- Johnathan Oberlander (M.A. 1990, M.Phil 1993, Ph.D. 1995), author and professor of social medicine at the University of North Carolina at Chapel Hill
- Mary I. O'Connor (B.S. 1979), chair of orthopedic surgery at Mayo Clinic; director of the Center for Musculoskeletal Care at the Yale School of Medicine
- H.T. Odum (Ph.D. 1950), ecologist, professor at the University of Florida
- J. Roger Porter (Ph.D. 1938), microbiology professor at University of Iowa, 1938–79
- Tia Powell (M.D.), psychiatrist, former head of NY State Task Force on Life & the Law
- Megan Ranney, dean of the Yale School of Public Health (2023 – )
- Christian R. H. Raetz (B.S. 1967), professor of biochemistry at Duke University
- Marjorie S. Rosenthal (M.D. 1995; Fellow 2016), associate professor in the Department of Pediatrics at the Yale University School of Medicine; co-director of Yale's National Clinician Scholars Program (NCSP) and director of the NCSP Community Research Initiative; former Robert Wood Johnson Foundation Clinical Scholar at both Yale and the University of North Carolina
- Jonathan Rothberg (Ph.D. 1921), first to sequence an individual human genome; serial biotechnology entrepreneur; professor of genetics at Yale
- James Rothman (B.A. 1971), biologist, winner of 2002 Lasker Award for Basic Medical Research (sometimes called "America's Nobel Prize")
- David Sanders (B.S. 1983), structural biologist at Purdue University
- William Thompson Sedgwick (B.A. 1877), bacteriologist, epidemiologist, founder of the MIT-Harvard School of Public Health
- Florence B. Seibert (Ph.D. 1923), biochemist, winner of 1942 Garvan–Olin Medal and member of the National Women's Hall of Fame
- Robert Shope (faculty 1965–95), arbovirologist and emerging infectious diseases expert
- Linda Siegel (M.S., 1964 and Ph.D., 1966), wrote doctoral dissertation on information processing in children; worked as a cognitive psychologist and was holder of the Dorothy C. Lam Chair in Special Education at the University of British Columbia 1996–2010
- Julian M. Sturtevant (Ph.D., 1931), professor of biochemistry, Yale University

== Mathematics and computer science ==
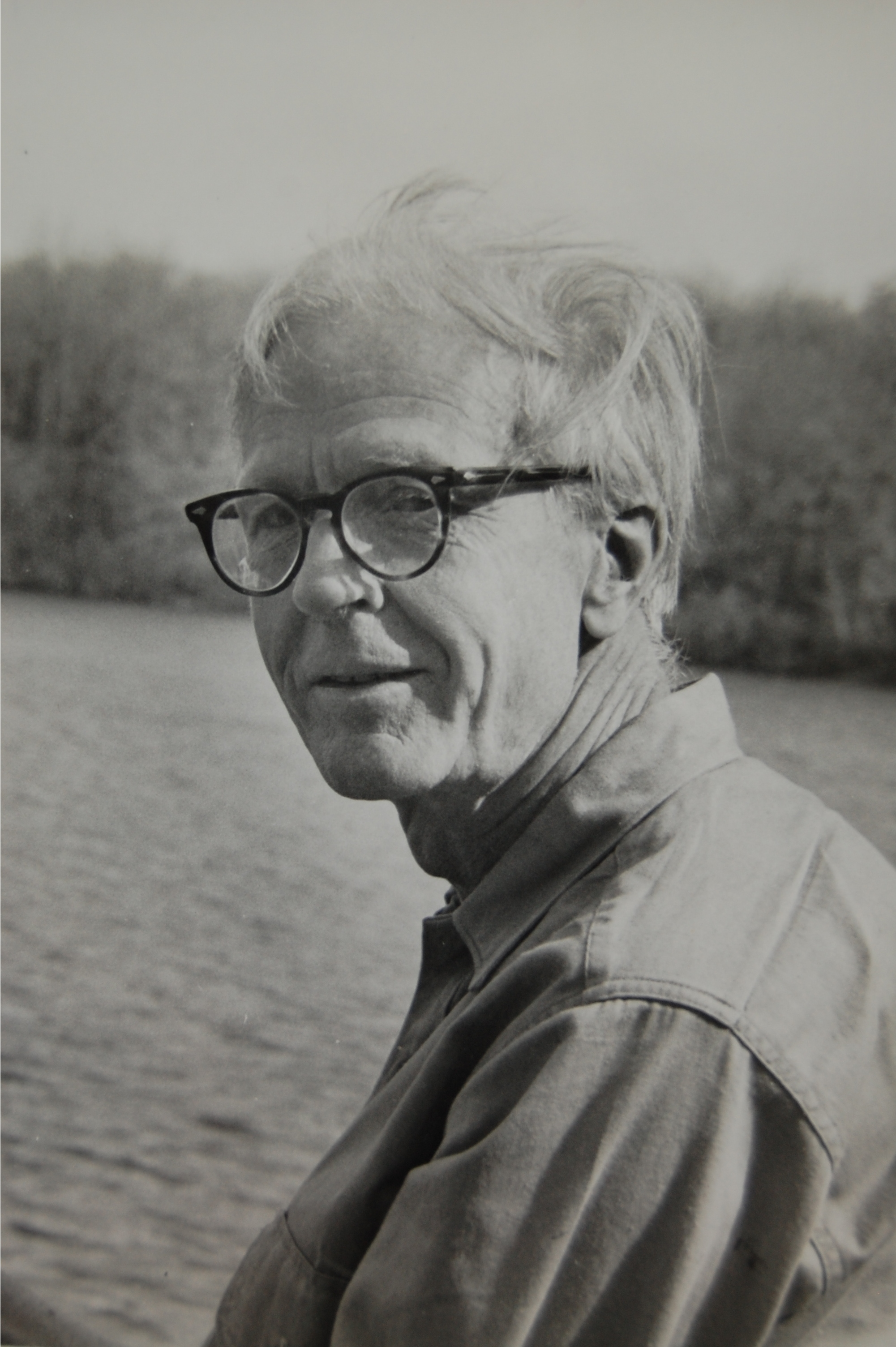
Hassler Whitney

- James Arthur (Ph.D. 1970), Wolf Prize medallist, mathematician known for Arthur-Selberg trace formula and Arthur conjectures
- Jeffrey Brock (B.A. 1992), Dean of the School of Engineering and Applied Sciences at Yale University, Guggenheim Fellow known for his work on classifying hyperbolic 3-manifolds
- Jaime Carbonell (Ph.D. 1979), University Professor, Carnegie Mellon School of Computer Science
- Bernard Chazelle (Ph.D. 1980), Eugene Higgins Professor of Computer Science at Princeton University
- Bruce Donald (B.A. 1980), James B. Duke Professor of Computer Science and Mathematics, Chemistry and Biochemistry, at Duke University and the Duke University Medical Center
- Theodore Gamelin (B.S. 1960), professor emeritus of mathematics at the University of California, Los Angeles
- Andrew M. Gleason (B.A. 1942), chair of Mathematics at Harvard, World War II codebreaker, made fundamental contributions to Lie Groups, Quantum Mechanics and Combinatorics
- Leslie Greengard (M.D., Ph.D. 1987), former director of the NYU Courant Institute of Mathematical Sciences; inventor of the fast multipole method
- Marshall Hall (B.A. 1932), mathematician, who made significant contributions to the development of group theory and combinatorics
- Richard S. Hamilton (B.A. 1963), discovered Ricci flow, instrumental to the solution of the Poincaré conjecture, winner of the Shaw Prize, Clay Research Award and AMS Leroy P. Steele Prize
- Brendan Hassett (B.A. 1992), mathematician who made significant contributions to higher-dimensional arithmetic geometry and birational geometry, fellow of the American Mathematical Society
- Paul Hudak, professor of computer science, co-creator of the programming language Haskell
- Janet Kolodner (Ph.D. 1980), cognitive scientist, Regents' Professor, College of Computing, Georgia Tech
- Robert Langlands (Ph.D. 1960), Abel Prize winner, emeritus professor, Institute for Advanced Study, author of the Langlands program
- Charles E. Leiserson (B.S. 1975), bestselling co-author of Introduction to Algorithms, inventor of Cilk, professor of Computer Science at MIT
- Saunders Mac Lane (B.A. 1930), mathematician, one of the founders of category theory
- Andreas Mandelis (B.Sc. 1974), expert on photonics; professor at the University of Toronto
- Alan Perlis, professor of computer science and first ever recipient of the Turing Award
- Matt Pharr (B.S. 1993), Academy Award winner for the formalization and reference implementation of the concepts behind physically based rendering
- Yoav Shoham (Ph.D. 1987), Allan Newell Award winner, professor emeritus at Stanford University
- Daniel Spielman (B.S. 1992), MacArthur Fellow, Godel, Polya and Nevanlinna Prize winner, Applied Mathematics and Computer Science professor at Yale University
- John Griggs Thompson (B.A. 1955), mathematician, winner of the Fields Medal in 1970
- Daniel S. Weld (B.A., B.S. 1982), professor of Computer Science and Engineering at University of Washington
- John H. Wharton, software engineer specializing in microprocessors
- Brian White (B.A. 1977), professor of mathematics at Stanford University who specializes in differential geometry and geometric measure theory
- Hassler Whitney (B.S. 1928) (B.A. 1929), mathematician, founder of singularity theory, foundational work in manifolds and embedding, Wolf Prize medallist
- Robert Wilensky (B.A. 1971, Ph.D. 1978), former chair of Computer Science at UC Berkeley, doctoral advisor of Peter Norvig

== Physical sciences and engineering ==
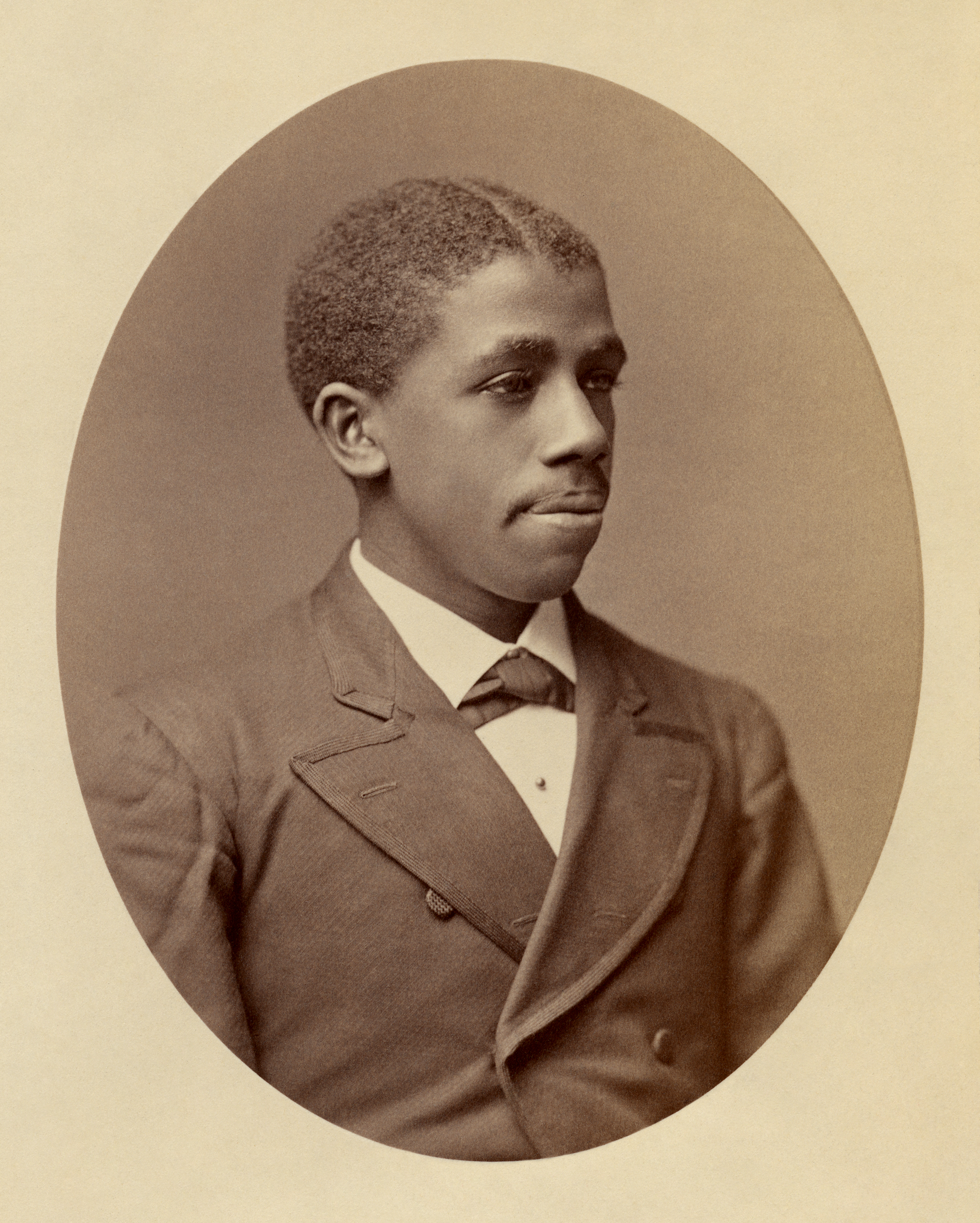
Edward Bouchet

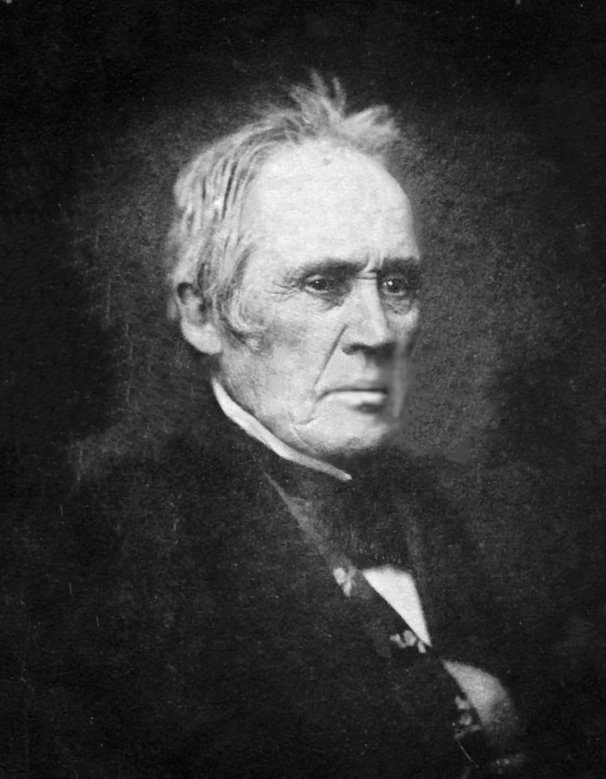
Benjamin Silliman

- Richard Lee Armstrong (BSc 1959, Ph.D. Geology 1964), American-Canadian geochemist
- Walter A. Bell (MSc 1911, Ph.D. Geology 1920), Canadian geologist and paleontologist
- Edward Bouchet (B.A. 1874, Ph.D. Physics 1876), first African-American to graduate from Yale and the first to receive a Ph.D. at an American university
- Emanuel Fritz (M.A. Forestry 1914), professor of forestry and noted consultant on California redwoods
- Milton Harris (Ph.D. 1929), chemist
- McAllister Hull (B.S. 1948, Ph.D. 1951), Manhattan Project explosive lens expert, Yale physics professor, SUNY Buffalo dean, University of New Mexico professor and provost
- Michael E. Mann (Ph.D. 1998), climatologist and geophysicist at Penn State University, originator of the "hockey stick graph"
- Henry Margenau (Ph.D. 1929), physicist and philosopher of science, expert on spectral analysis and microwave theory
- Clark Blanchard Millikan (B.A. 1924), professor of aeronautics, noted researcher, administrator and advisor at California Institute of Technology
- E. R. Ward Neale (M.S. 1951; Ph.D. 1952), geologist, professor at Memorial University of Newfoundland
- Benjamin Silliman (B.A. 1796) (M.A. 1799), "father of American scientific education"
- Lyman Spitzer (B.S. 1935), theoretical physicist, National Medal of Science winner, namesake of NASA's Spitzer Space Telescope
- Eugene Stevens (B.S. 1960), professor at Binghamton University, known for research in biodegradable plastics
- Josiah Whitney (B.A. 1839), geologist, chief of California Geological Survey, and geology professor at Harvard University
- Arthur Wightman (B.A. 1942), founding father of modern mathematical physics, Poincare Prize Winner
- Zhan Tianyou (Ph.B. 1881), pioneering Chinese railroad engineer, considered the "father of China's railroad"

== Law and politics ==
George H. W. Bush

George W. Bush

Bill Clinton

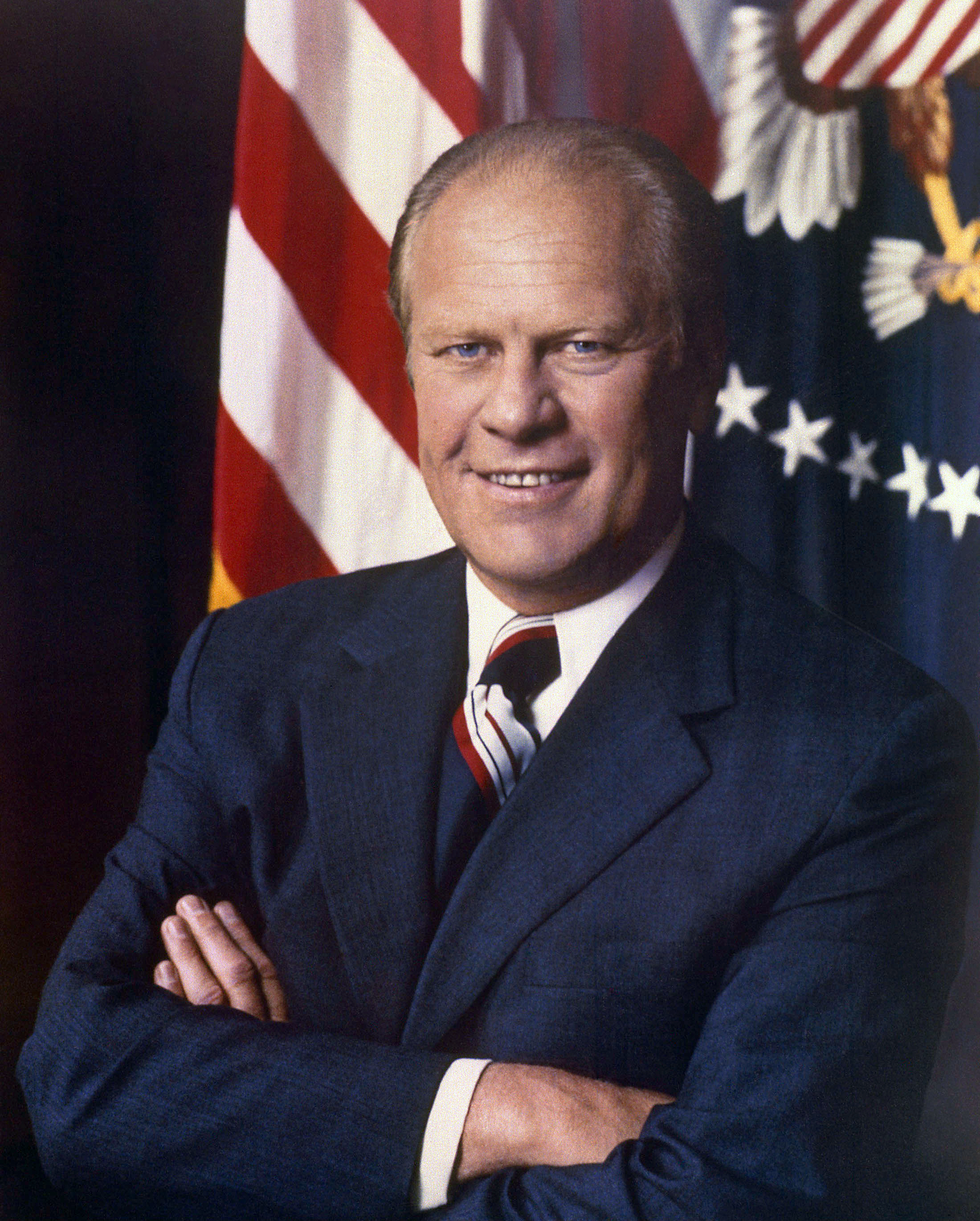
Gerald Ford

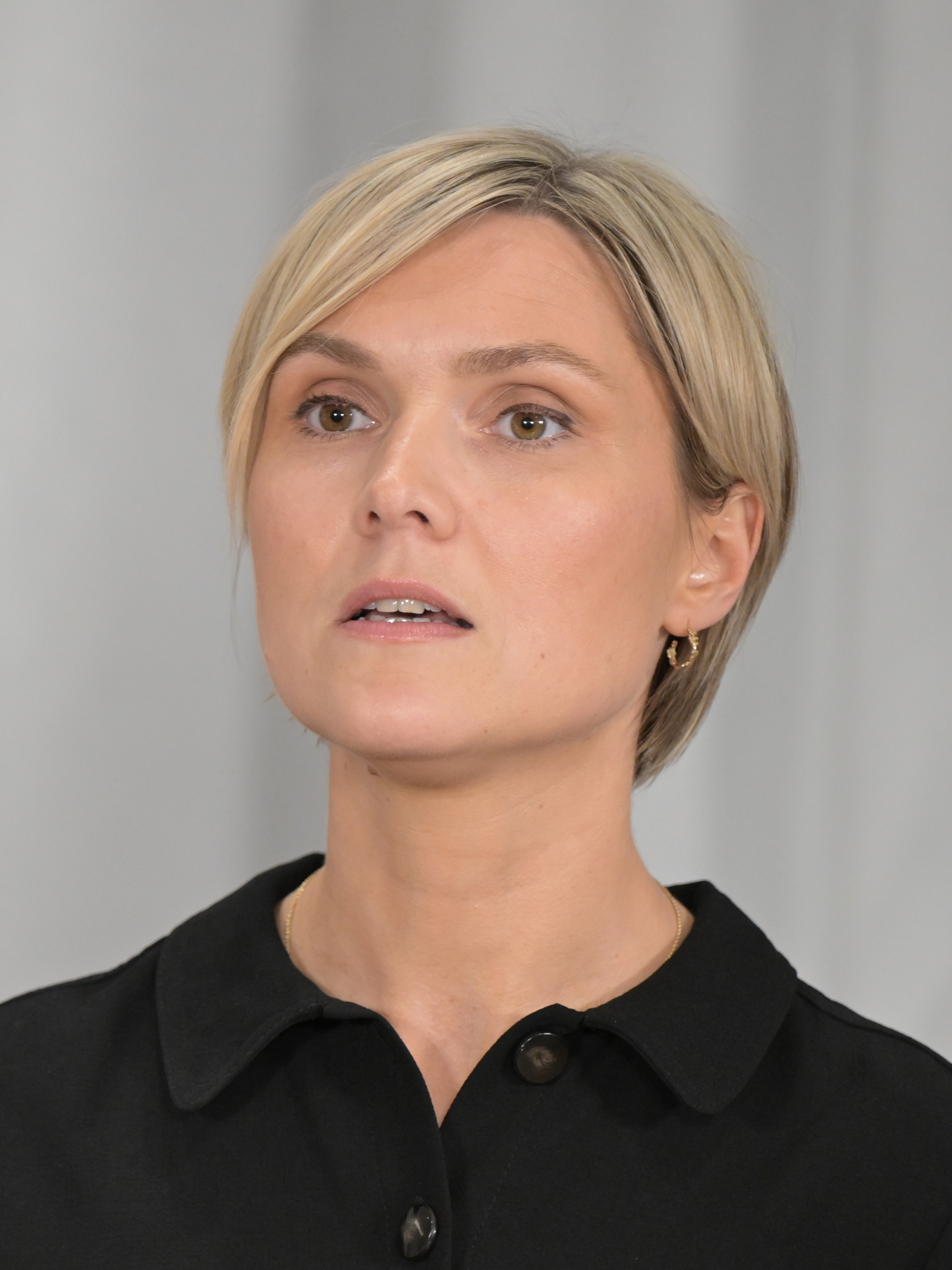
Kristrún Frostadóttir

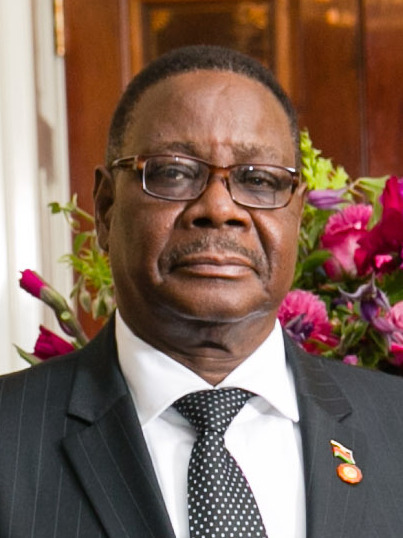
Peter Mutharika

=== Presidents and vice presidents, royalty, other heads of state, prime ministers and ministers ===
- Abd al-Karim al-Iryani (Ph.D. 1968), prime minister of the Republic of Yemen (1980–83, 1998–2001), and Foreign Minister (1993–98)
- Olympia Bonaparte, Princess Napoléon, consort of Jean-Christophe, Prince Napoléon
- George H. W. Bush (B.A. 1948), president of the United States (1989–93), vice president of the United States (1981–89), member of the House of Representatives (R-Texas) (1967–71), played baseball while attending and was on the 1947 and 1948 College World Series runner-up teams
- George W. Bush (B.A. 1968), president of the United States (2001–09), governor of Texas (1995–2000)
- John C. Calhoun (B.A. 1804), seventh vice president of the United States, for two different presidents, John Quincy Adams and Andrew Jackson; senator; member of the House of Representatives; secretary of state in the Tyler presidential administration
- Karl Carstens (L.L.M. 1949), fifth president of Germany (1979–84)
- Dick Cheney (attended, transferred to Wyoming), vice president of the United States (2001–09)
- Tansu Çiller (postdoctoral fellow), prime minister of Turkey (1993–96)
- Bill Clinton (J.D. 1973), president of the United States (1993–2001), governor of Arkansas (1979–81, 1983–92)
- Kristrún Frostadóttir (M.A. 2016), prime minister of Iceland (2024–present)
- Gerald Ford (LL.B. 1941), president of the United States (1974–77), vice president of the United States (1973–74), member of the House of Representatives
- Jiang Yi-huah, premier of the Republic of China (2012–13)
- Stavros Lambrinidis (J.D. 1988), vice president of the European Parliament (2009–11), minister for foreign affairs of Greece (2011)
- José P. Laurel, president of the Philippines in World War II
- Salvador H. Laurel (LL.M 1953) (J.S.D.1960), vice president of the Philippines (1986–92)
- Lee Hong-koo (Ph.D. 1968), prime minister of South Korea (1994–95)
- Mario Monti (M.Sc. 1968), prime minister of Italy (2011–13)
- Wendell Mottley (B.A. 1964), Olympic medalist and subsequently a government of Trinidad and Tobago minister
- Peter Mutharika (LL.M. 1966, J.S.D. 1969), 5th president of Malawi
- Ivan Sergeyevich Obolensky, prince, aristocrat, financier, grandson of Tsar Alexander II of Russia
- Jovito R. Salonga (J.S.D.1949), senator of the Philippines (1965–72) (1987–92)
- William Howard Taft (B.A. 1878, honorary LL.D. 1893), 27th president of the United States (1909–13), 10th chief justice of the United States (1921–30)
- JD Vance (J.D. 2013), vice president of the United States (2025–present), U.S. senator (R-Ohio, 2023–25)
- Victoria, Crown Princess of Sweden of the House of Bernadotte (Class of 2000, attended for two years)
- Valdis Zatlers, president of Latvia (2007–11)
- Ernesto Zedillo (Ph.D. 1981), president of Mexico (1994–2000)

=== Supreme Court justices ===
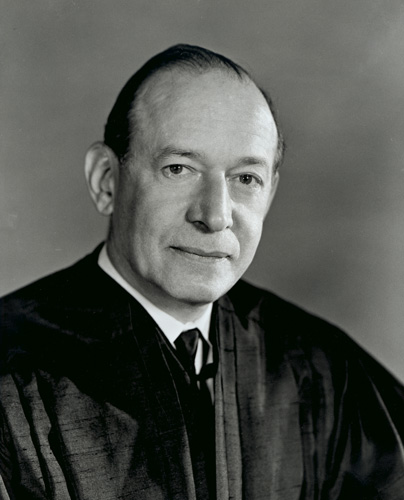
Abe Fortas

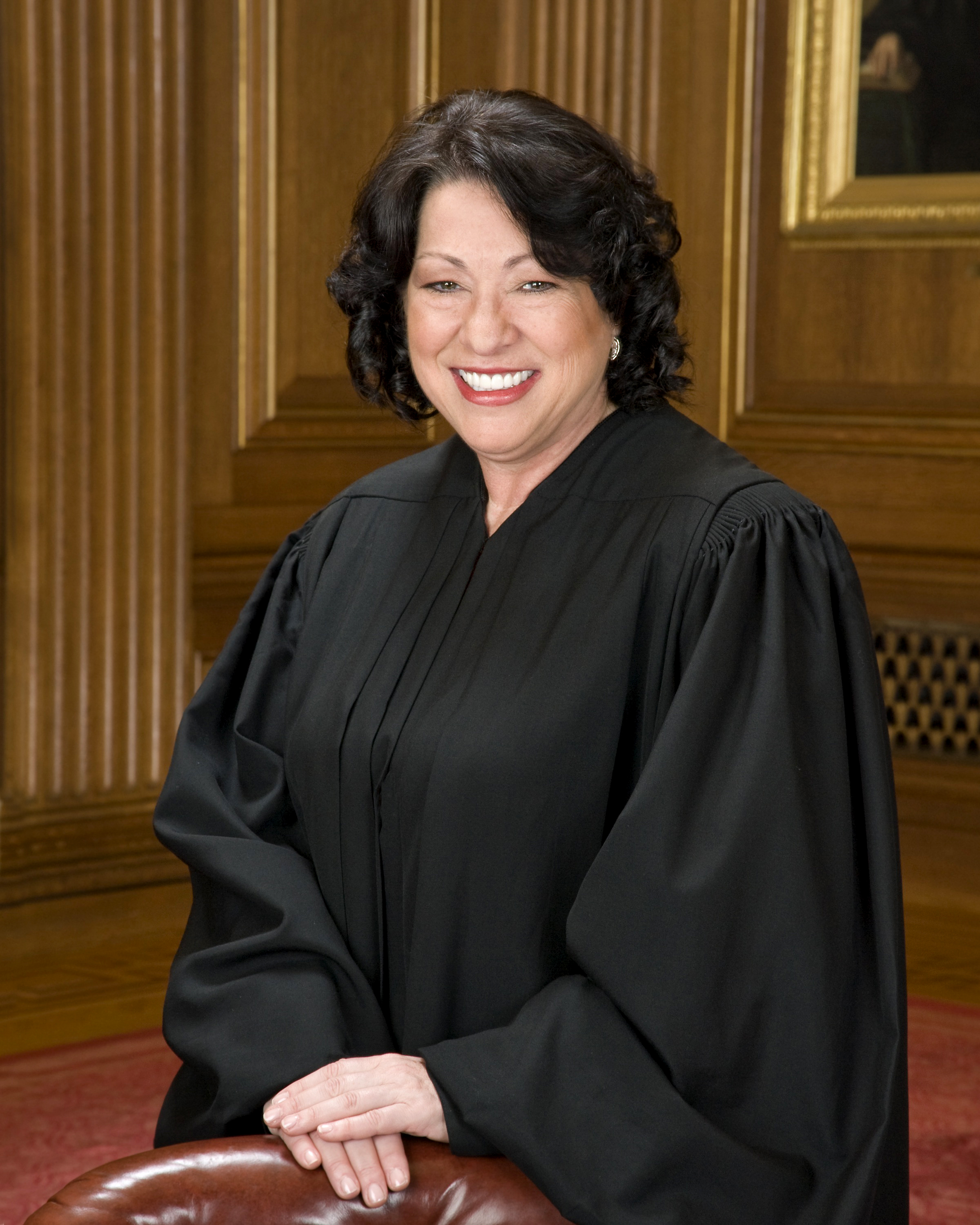
Sonia Sotomayor

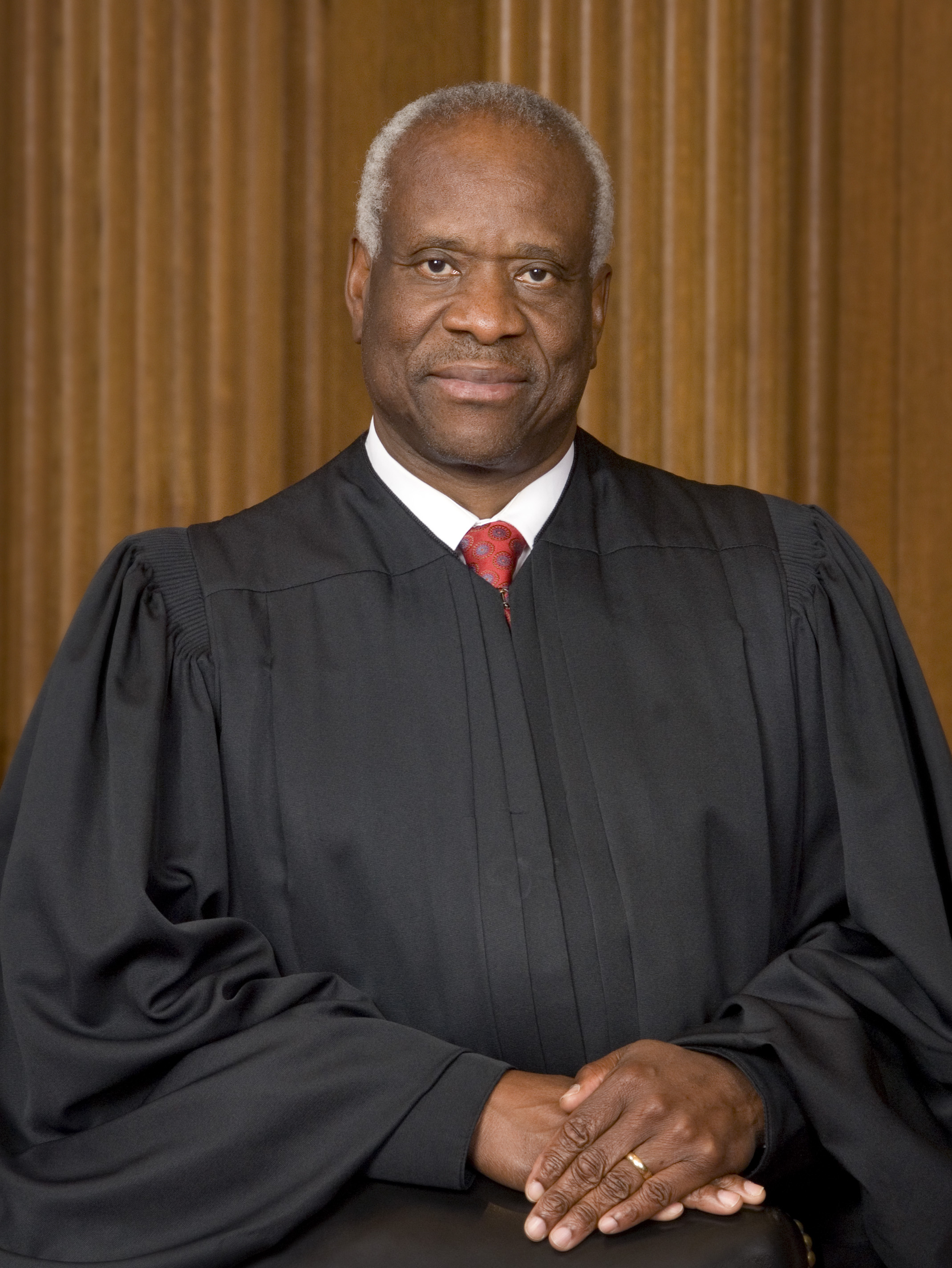
Clarence Thomas

Information can be verified through the Biographical Directory of Federal Judges.

- Samuel Alito (J.D. 1975), Supreme Court justice (2006–present)
- Henry Baldwin (1797), Supreme Court justice (1830–44)
- David J. Brewer (1856), Supreme Court justice (1889–1910)
- Henry Billings Brown (1856, and law study, LL.D. 1891), Supreme Court justice (1891–1906)
- David Davis (Law 1835), Supreme Court justice (1862–77)
- Oliver Ellsworth (Class of 1766), Supreme Court justice (1796–1800)
- Abe Fortas (Law 1933), Supreme Court justice (1965–69)
- Brett Kavanaugh (J.D 1990), Supreme Court justice (2018–present)
- Sherman Minton (YLS one-year degree, 1917), Supreme Court justice (1949–56)
- George Shiras Jr. (1853), Supreme Court justice (1892–1903)
- Sonia Sotomayor (J.D. 1979), Supreme Court justice (2009–present)
- Potter Stewart (1937, Law 1941), Supreme Court justice (1958–81)
- William Strong (1828, GRD 1831, briefly attended YLS), Supreme Court justice (1870–80)
- William Howard Taft (B.A. 1878, LL.D. 1893), 27th president of the United States (1909–13), 10th chief justice of the United States (1921–30)
- Clarence Thomas (J.D. 1974), Supreme Court justice (1991–present)
- Morrison R. Waite (1837), chief justice of the United States (1874–88)
- Byron White (Law 1946), Supreme Court justice (1962–93)
- William B. Woods (1845), Supreme Court justice (1881–87)

=== U.S. senators ===
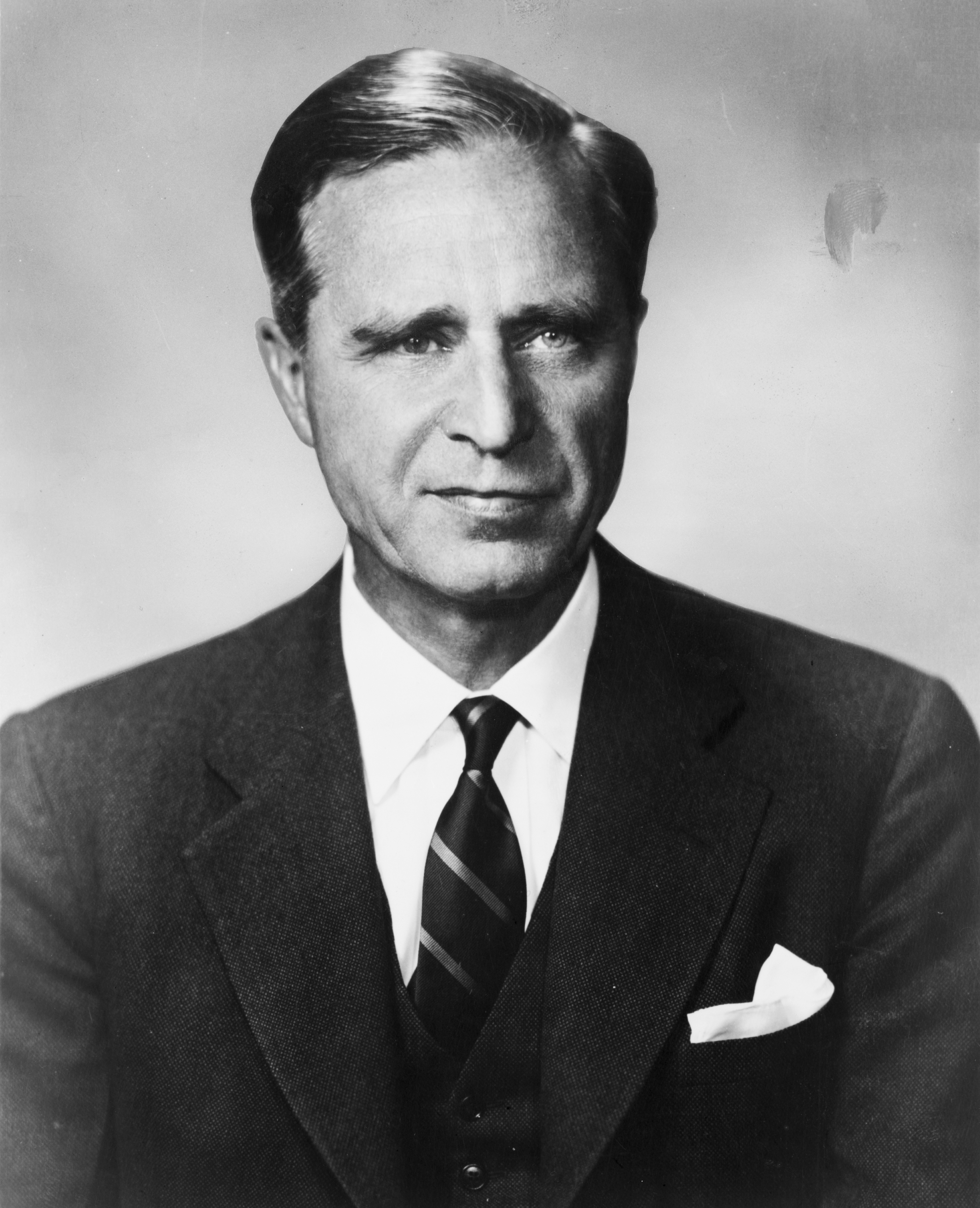
Prescott Bush

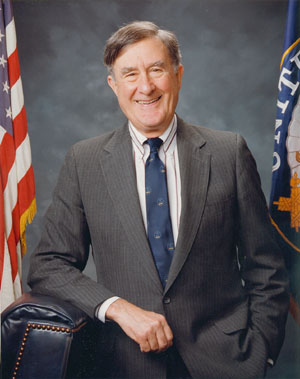
John Chafee

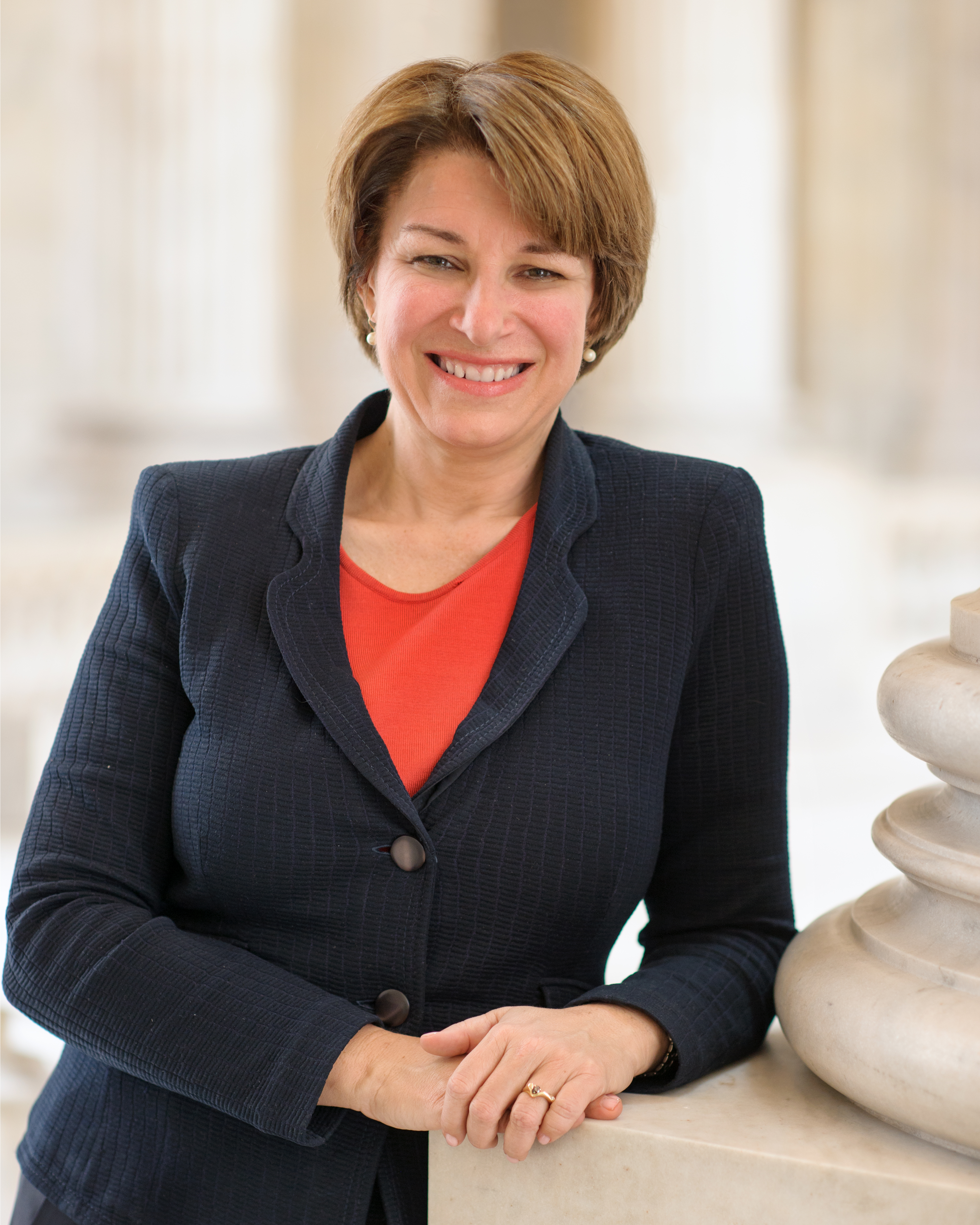
Amy Klobuchar

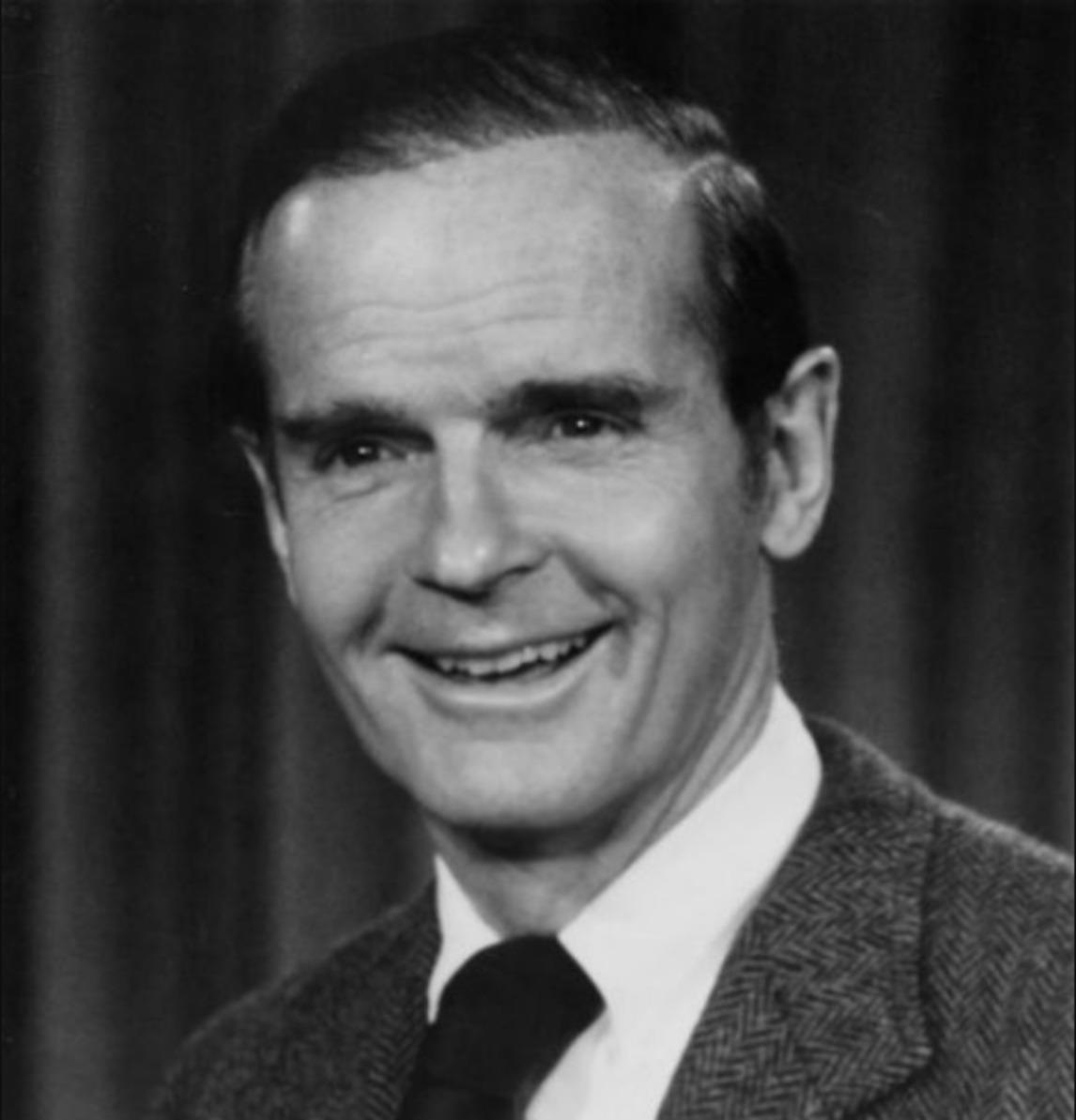
William Proxmire

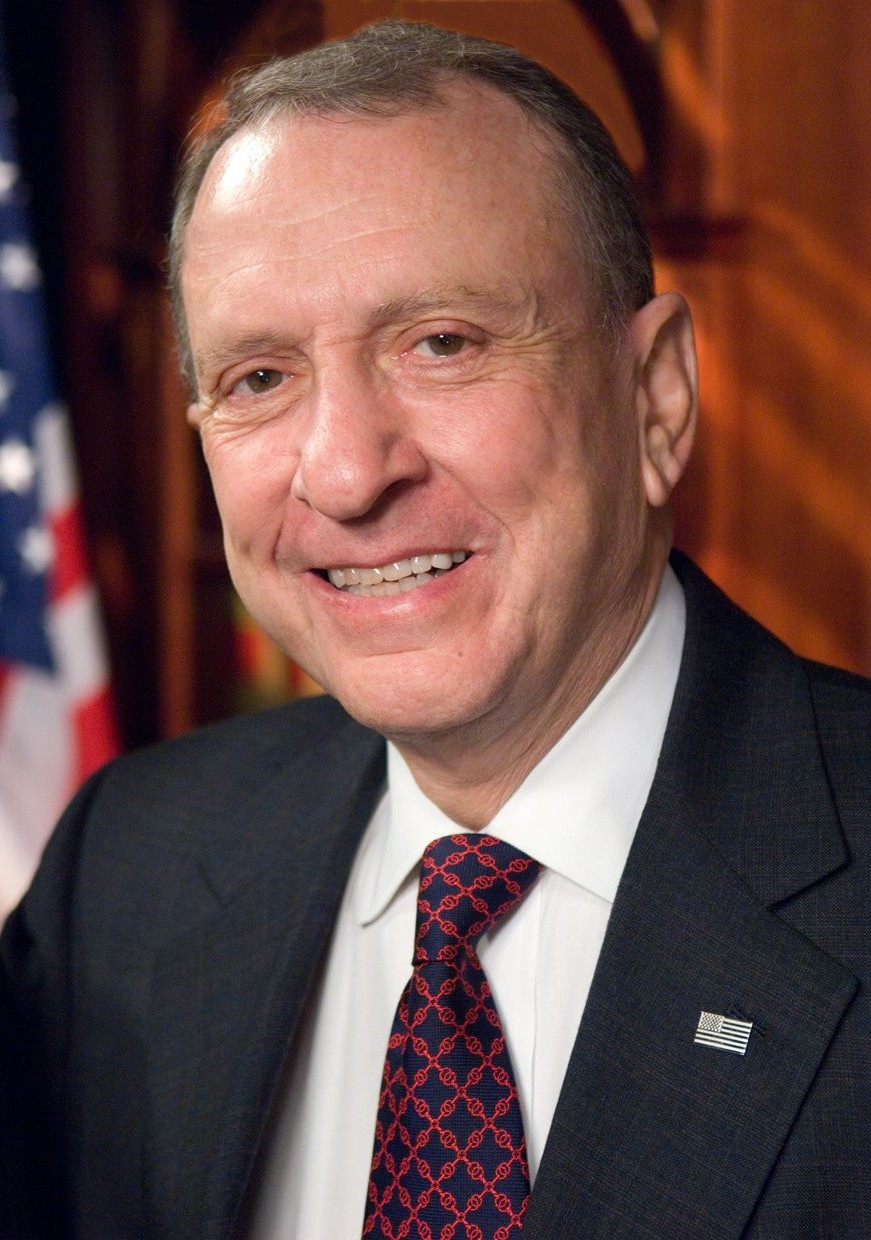
Arlen Specter

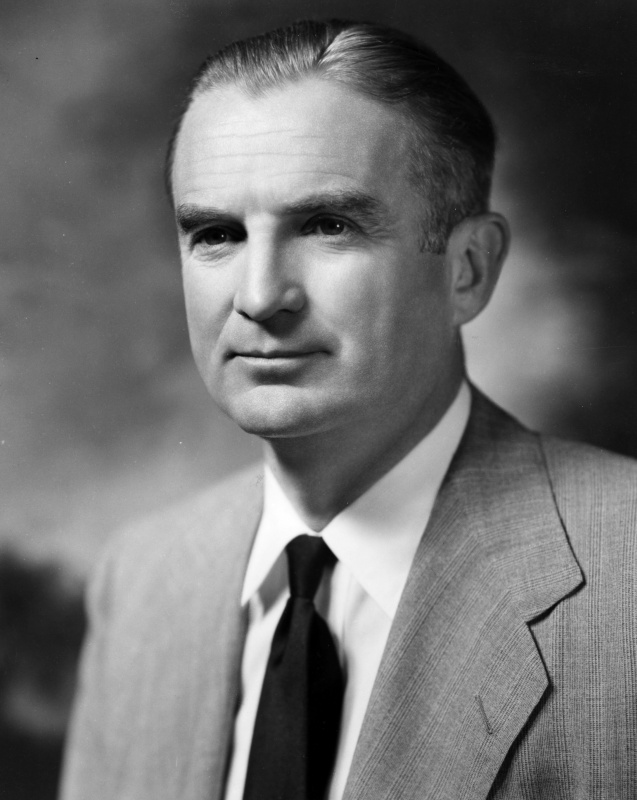
Stuart Symington

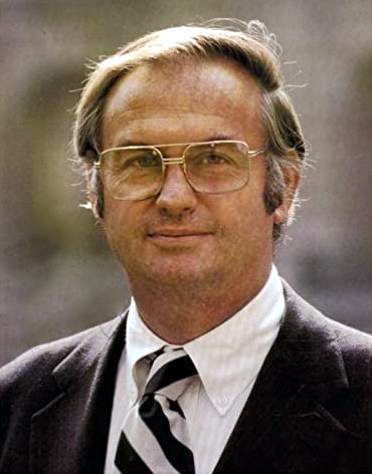
Lowell Weicker

Information can be verified at the Biographical Directory of the U.S. Congress.

- Alva B. Adams (1896), U.S. senator (D-Colorado, 1923–24, 1932–41)
- John Ashcroft (B.A. 1964 cum laude), U.S. attorney general (2001–05), U.S. senator (R-Missouri, 1995–2001), governor of Missouri (1985–93)
- Abraham Baldwin (B.A. 1772), U.S. representative (1789–99), U.S. senator (1799–1807); author of the charter for, and president of, the University of Georgia (1786–1801)
- Roger Sherman Baldwin (B.A. 1811), governor of Connecticut (1844–46), U.S. senator (Whig-Connecticut, 1847–51)
- John Beall (B.A. 1950), U.S. senator (R-Maryland, 1971–76)
- Michael Bennet (J.D. 1993), U.S. senator (D-Colorado, 2009–)
- Hiram Bingham III (1898), governor of Connecticut (1925), U.S. senator (R-Connecticut, 1924–33); explorer who rediscovered the lost city of Machu Picchu, Peru; said to be the inspiration behind the fictional character Indiana Jones
- Richard Blumenthal (J.D. 1973), U.S. senator (D-Connecticut, 2011–)
- Cory Booker (J.D. 1997), U.S. senator (D-New Jersey, 2013–), former mayor of Newark
- David Boren (B.A. 1963), governor of Oklahoma (1975–79), U.S. senator (D-Oklahoma, 1979–94), president of University of Oklahoma
- Stephen R. Bradley (B.A. 1775, M.A. 1778), U.S. senator (Democratic-Republican Party), Vermont, 1801–13
- Nicholas F. Brady (B.A. 1952), U.S. senator (R-New Jersey, 1982)
- Sherrod Brown (B.A. 1974), U.S. representative (1993–2007), U.S. senator (D-Ohio, 2007–2025)
- James L. Buckley (B.A. 1943, Law 1949), U.S. senator (C-New York, 1971–77); president of Radio Free Europe, 1982–85; federal judge for the United States Court of Appeals (District of Columbia Circuit) (1985–96)
- Prescott Bush (B.A. 1917), U.S. senator (R-Connecticut, 1953–63), father of George H. W. Bush, grandfather to George W. Bush
- John Chafee (B.A. 1947), governor of Rhode Island (1962–69), secretary of the navy (1969–72), U.S. senator (R–Rhode Island, 1976–99)
- John M. Clayton (1815), secretary of state in the Taylor administration, U.S. senator (AJ–Delaware, 1829–36; W-Delaware, 1845–49; O-Delaware 1853–56)
- Hillary Clinton (J.D. 1973), U.S. senator (D-New York (2001–09)
- LeBaron Colt (B.A. 1868), U.S. senator (R-Rhode Island, 1913–24)
- Chris Coons (J.D./M.A.), U.S. senator (D-Delaware, 2010–)
- David Daggett (1783), U.S. senator (F-Connecticut, 1813–19)
- John Danforth (J.D. DIV 1963), U.S senator (R-Missouri, 1976–95)
- David Davis (Law 1835), appointed associate justice of the Supreme Court by Lincoln (1862–77); U.S. senator (I-Illinois, 1877–83)
- John Davis (1787–1854), U.S. senator (W/NR-Massachusetts, 1835–41 and 1845–53)
- Henry L. Dawes (1839), U.S. senator (R-Connecticut, 1875–93)
- Mark Dayton (B.A. 1969), U.S. senator (D-Minnesota, 2001–07)
- Fred Dubois (B.A. 1872), U.S. senator (R-Idaho, 1891–97; D-Idaho, 1901–07)
- William M. Evarts (1837), secretary of state under Hayes, U.S. senator (R-New York, 1885–91)
- Gary Hart (DIV 1961, LLB 1964), U.S. senator (D-Colorado, 1975–87)
- John Heinz (B.A. 1960), U.S. senator (R-Pennsylvania)
- James Hillhouse (B.A. 1773), U.S. senator (F-Connecticut, 1796–1810)
- James Jeffords (B.A. 1956), U.S. senator (I-Vermont, 1989–2007)
- William Samuel Johnson (B.A. 1744, M.A. 1747), United States Founding Father, member of the Continental Congress (1785–1787), delegate to the Constitutional Convention in 1787, president (1787–1800) of Columbia University (he was its first president under its new name of Columbia College; his father was the first president of the institution when it was known as King's College), U.S. senator (Connecticut, 1789–1791)
- John Kean (1852–1914), U.S. senator (R-New Jersey)
- Amy Klobuchar (B.A. 1982), U.S. senator (D-Minnesota, 2007–)
- James Lanman (1788), U.S. senator (D-Connecticut, 1819–25)
- Joseph Lieberman (B.A. 1964, J.D. 1967), U.S. senator (I-Connecticut, 1989–2013)
- Joseph Medill McCormick (1900), U.S. Senate 1919–24, publisher, Chicago Tribune
- Return J. Meigs Jr. (B.A. 1785), U.S. senator (DR–Ohio, 1808–10), 4th governor of Ohio (1810–14), 8th U.S. postmaster general (1814–23); namesake of Meigs County, Ohio
- Henry Mitchell (1804), U.S. representative (Jacksonian-New York, 1833–35)
- Thurston Morton (B.A. 1929), U.S. senator (R-Kentucky, 1957–68)
- Bill Nelson (B.A. 1965), U.S. representative (D-Florida, 1979–91), astronaut (STS-61-C, 1986), U.S. senator (D-Florida, 2001–19)
- Truman Newberry, U.S. senator (R-Michigan, 1919–22), secretary of the navy 1908–09
- Francis Newlands (ca. 1859), U.S. senator (D-Nevada, 1903–17)
- William Proxmire (B.A. 1948), U.S. senator (D-Wisconsin, 1957–89)
- Ben Sasse (Ph.D. 2004), U.S. senator (R-Nebraska, 2014–)
- Arlen Specter (LL.B. 1956), U.S. senator (D-Pennsylvania, 1981–2011)
- Stuart Symington (B.A. 1923), U.S. secretary of the Air Force, U.S. senator (D-Missouri, 1953–76)
- Robert A. Taft (B.A. 1910), U.S. senator (R-Ohio, 1939–53)
- Robert Taft Jr. (B.A. 1939), U.S. representative (R-Ohio, 1963–64, 1967–70), U.S. senator (R-Ohio, 1971–76)
- John V. Tunney (B.A. 1956), U.S. representative (D-California, 1965–70), U.S. senator (D-California, 1971–77); inspiration for Robert Redford's character in the film The Candidate
- Frederic Walcott (1891), U.S. senator (R-Connecticut, 1929–35)
- John Wales (B.A. 1801), U.S. senator (W-Delaware, 1849–51); co-founder of Delaware College
- Malcolm Wallop (B.A. 1954), U.S. senator (R-Wyoming, 1977–95)
- Lowell Weicker (B.A. 1953), U.S. representative (R-Connecticut, 1968–71), U.S. senator (R-Connecticut, 1971–89), governor of Connecticut (1990–94)
- Sheldon Whitehouse (B.A. 1978), U.S. senator (D-Rhode Island, 2006–)
- Pete Wilson (B.A. 1956), U.S. senator (R-California, 1983–91), governor of California 1991–99

=== Other legislators ===
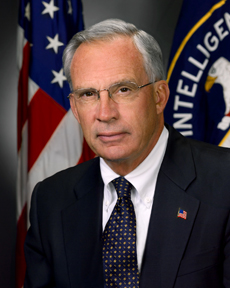
Porter Goss

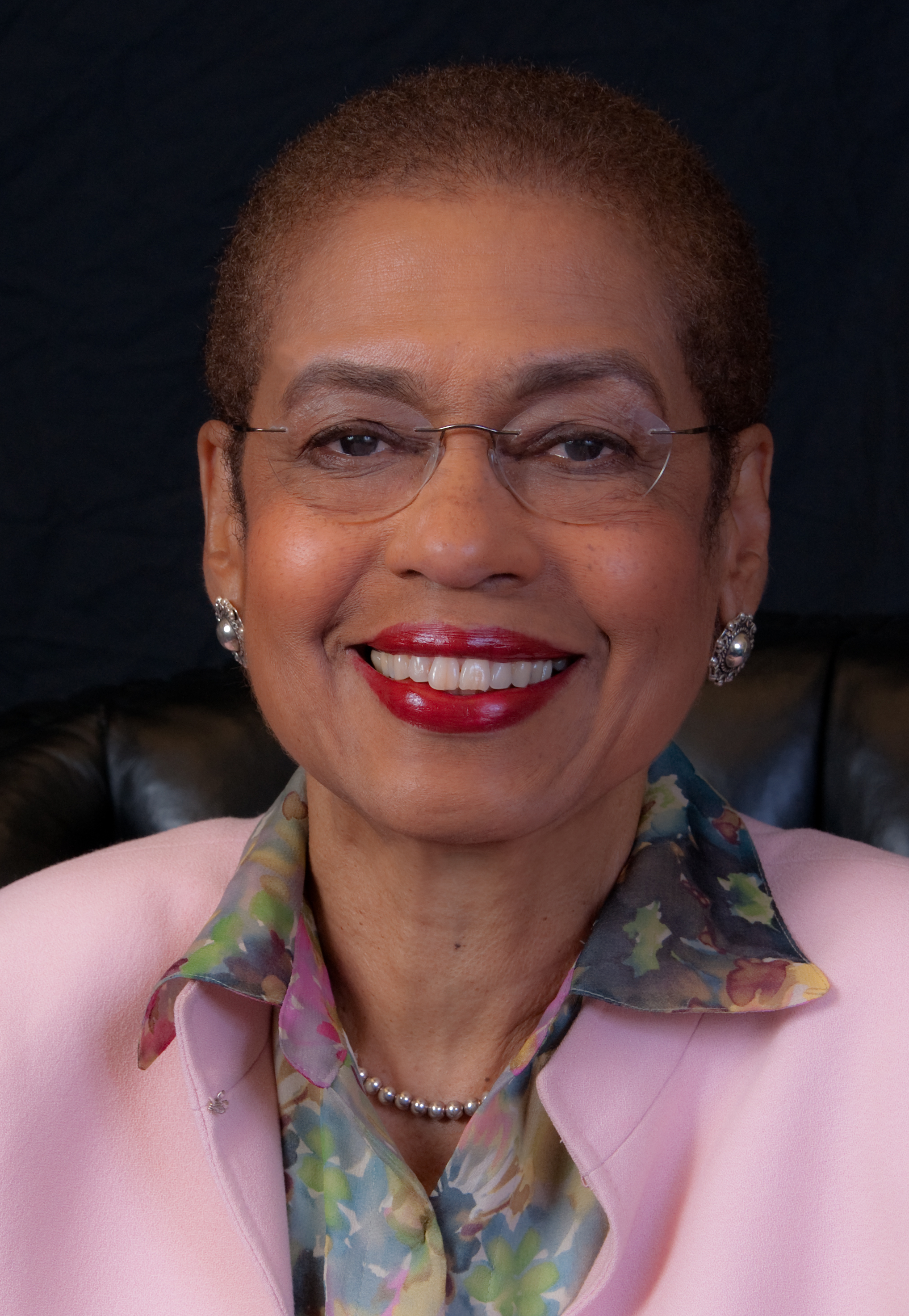
Eleanor Holmes Norton

- Joel M. Acker (1836), Mississippi state senator (1846, 1854–1856), Mississippi State House (1840–1844, 1865–1866)
- Richard S. Aldrich (B.A. 1906), U.S. representative, R-Rhode Island
- William L. Borden (B.A. 1942, J.D. 1947), executive director of United States Congress Joint Committee on Atomic Energy, 1949–53
- Carolyn Bourdeaux (B.A. 1992), U.S. representative, D-Georgia (2021–23)
- Winfield S. Braddock, Wisconsin State Assembly
- Edwin Corning Jr. (B.A. 1942), New York State Assembly
- Parker Corning (B.A. 1895), U.S. representative, D-New York
- Lawrence Coughlin, Republican representative from Pennsylvania, 1969–91
- Nelson Antonio Denis (J.D., 1980), New York state assemblyman
- Ron DeSantis (B.A., 2001), Republican representative from Florida (2013–18), governor of Florida
- Charles S. Dewey, Republican representative from Illinois (1941–42)
- Jerome F. Donovan (Law 1894), U.S. representative, D-New York (1918–21)
- E. D. Estilette (B.A. 1857), Speaker of the Louisiana House of Representatives in 1876; state district court judge in St. Landry Parish, Louisiana
- Porter J. Goss, U.S. representative, R-FL, 1989–2004, and director of CIA
- Anne P. Graham (M.S. 1986), Maine House of Representatives
- George Hambrecht (LL.B. 1904), Wisconsin State Assembly (1909–10, 1915)
- Ro Khanna (J.D. 2001), U.S. representative, D-California (2017–present)
- Roland Kotani, member of Hawaii State House of Representatives
- Jonathan Kreiss-Tomkins (B.A. 2012), Alaska House of Representatives (2013–)
- Sheila Jackson Lee (B.A. 1972), U.S. representative, D-Texas
- Philip Livingston (B.A. 1737), delegate and signer of the Declaration of Independence from New York, state senator
- Dwight Loomis (1847), U.S. representative from Connecticut (1859–63)
- Seth Magaziner (M.B.A. 2010), U.S. representative, D-Rhode Island (2023–present)
- Samuel Augustus Maverick (B.A. 1828), member of the Texas State Senate, namesake for eponym "maverick"
- Edward Ralph May (1838), sole delegate to the Indiana Constitutional Convention of 1850 to support African American suffrage
- David M. McIntosh (B.A. 1980), U.S. representative, R-Indiana (1994–2001)
- Warren A. Morton (1945), member of the Wyoming House of Representatives
- Eleanor Holmes Norton (M.A. 1963, LL.B. 1964), non-voting congressional delegate for District of Columbia (1991–)
- Hugh Q. Parmer (B.A. 1961), Democratic member of both houses of the Texas State Legislature, 1963–65 and 1983–91; mayor of Fort Worth, Texas, 1977–79
- Tom Perriello (B.A. 1996, J.D. 2001), U.S. representative, D-Virginia (2009–2011)
- Katie Porter (B.A. 1996), U.S. representative, D-California (2019–present)
- William S. Reyburn, Republican representative from Pennsylvania, 1911–13
- Carlos Romero Barceló (B.A. 1953), U.S. representative (resident commissioner), D-Puerto Rico (1993–2000), governor of Puerto Rico (1977–85)
- Daniel Sayre (B.A. 1985), Maine state representative
- Joe Sempolinski (M.A. 2006, M.Phil. 2008), U.S. representative, R-New York, 2022–23
- Brinley D. Sleight (B.A. 1858), New York State Assembly
- Gerry Studds (B.A. 1959, M.A. 1961), U.S. representative, D-Massachusetts, 1973–97
- Richard Swett (B.A. 1979), U.S. representative, D-New Hampshire, 1991–95
- Bruce Westerman (M.F. 2001), U.S. representative, R-Arkansas, 2015-present
(See also: #Diplomats)

=== Governors, mayors, other city and state officials ===
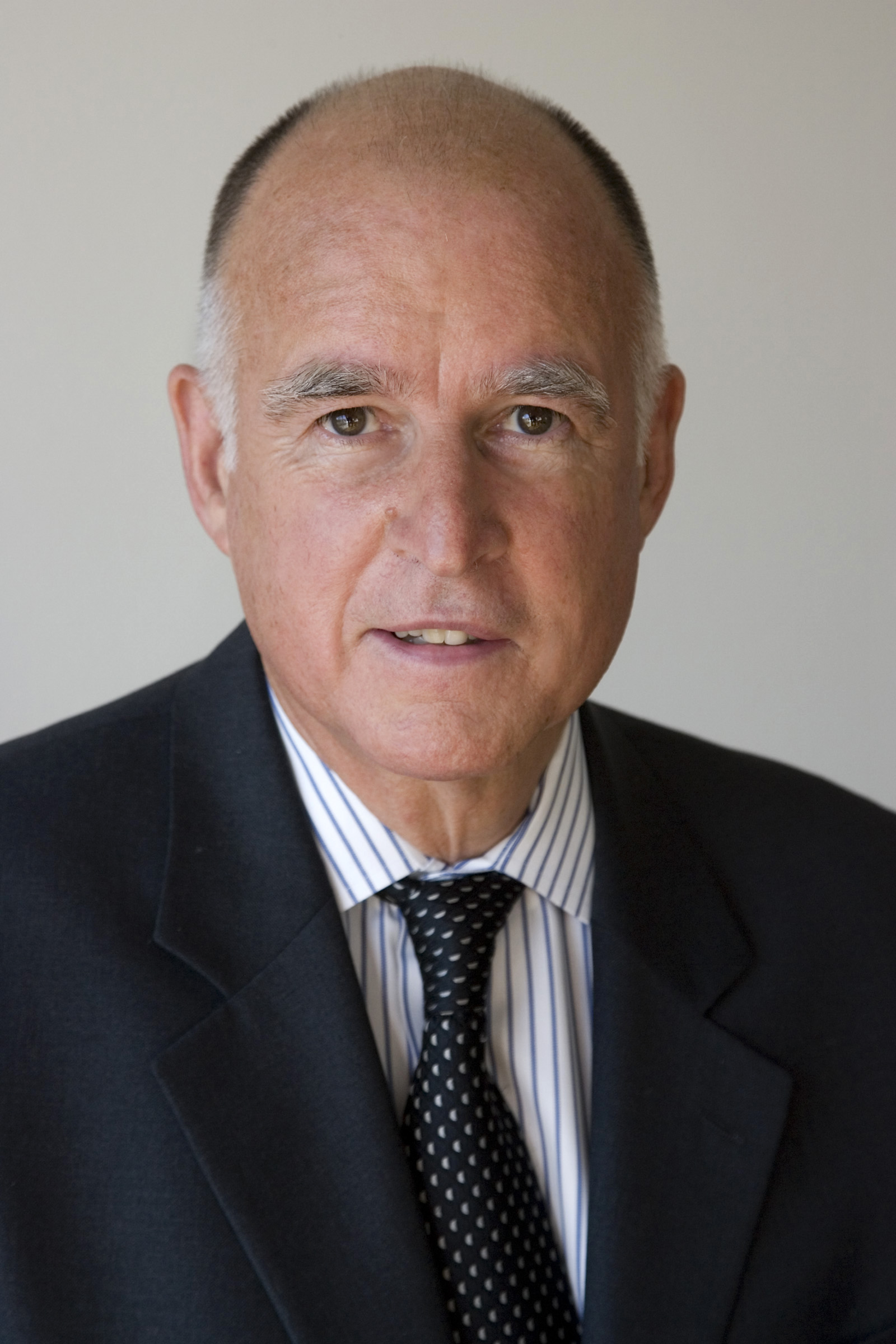
Jerry Brown

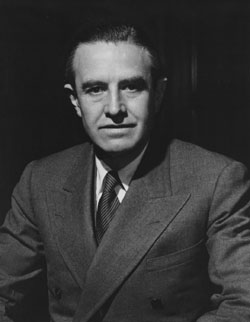
W. Averell Harriman

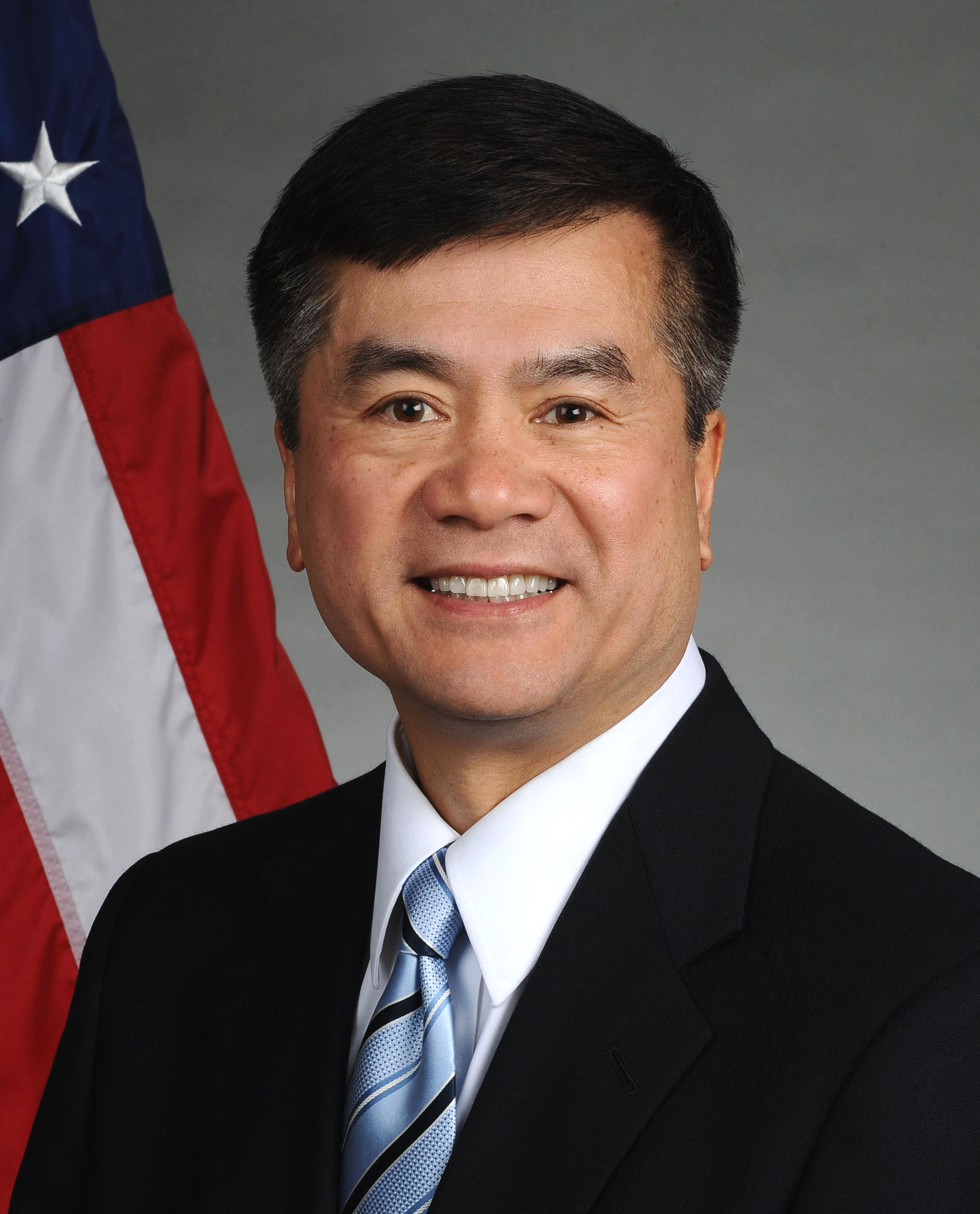
Gary Locke

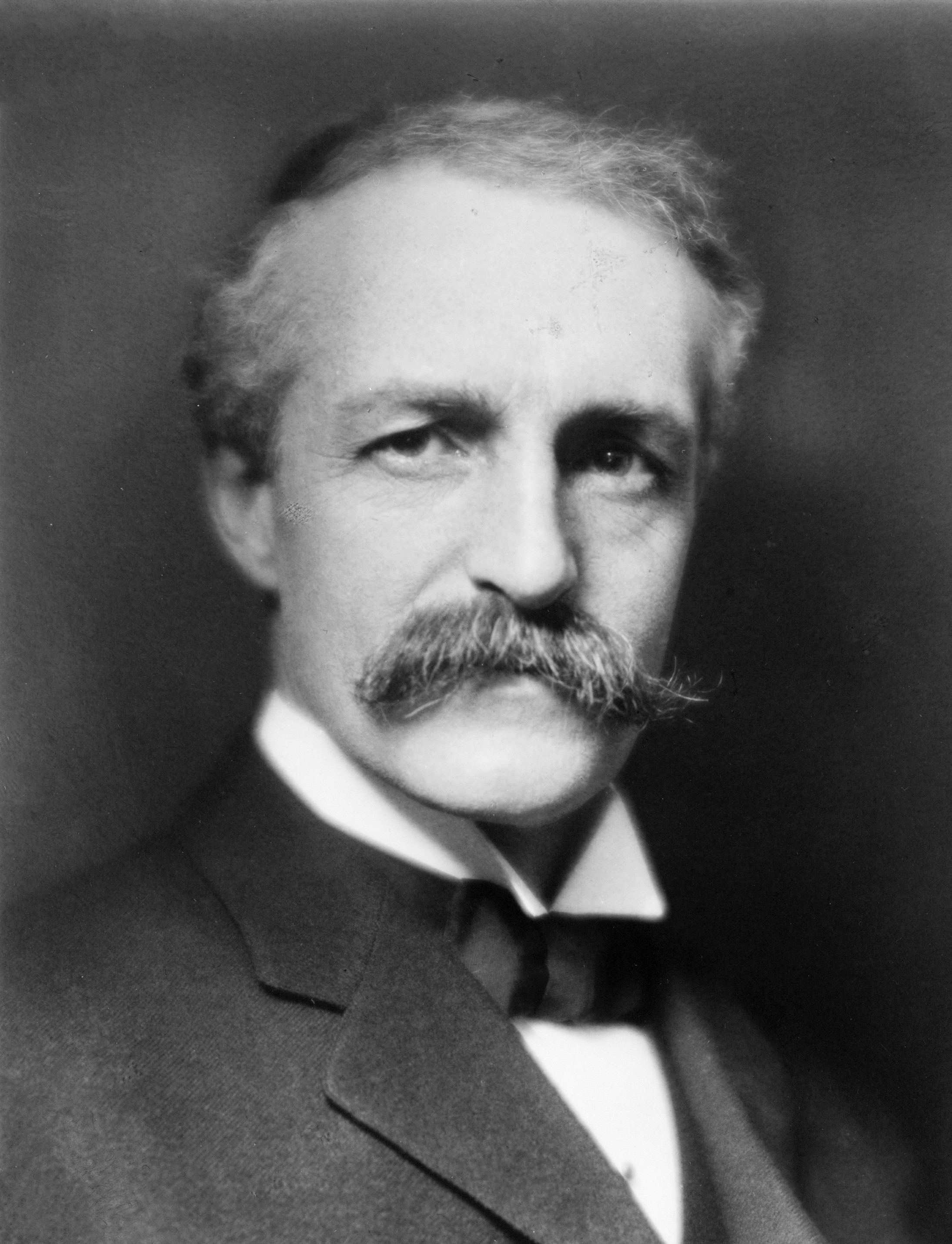
Gifford Pinchot

Alumni who have served as governors may also have served in other government capacities, such as president or senator. In such cases, the names are left un-linked, but are annotated with a "See also:" which links to the section on this page where a more detailed entry can be found.

- James Hopkins Adams (1831), governor of South Carolina (1854–56)
- John Ashcroft (B.A. 1964), governor of Missouri (1985–93) (See also: #U.S. senators)
- Roger Sherman Baldwin (B.A. 1811), governor of Connecticut (1844–46) (See also: #U.S. senators)
- Hiram Bingham III (B.A. 1898), governor of Connecticut (1925) (See also: #U.S. senators)
- Rob Bonta (B.A. 1993, J.D. 1998), 34th attorney general of California (2021–present)
- David L. Boren (B.A. 1963), governor of Oklahoma (1975–79) (See also: #U.S. senators)
- Chesa Boudin (J.D. 2011), district attorney of San Francisco (2020–22)
- Jabez Bowen (B.A. 1757), Federalist supporter, deputy governor of Rhode Island
- Edmund Gerald "Jerry" Brown Jr. (J.D. 1964), 34th and 39th governor of California
- George W. Bush (B.A. 1968), governor of Texas (1995–2000) (See also: #Presidents and vice presidents, royalty, other heads of state, prime ministers and ministers)
- Susan Bysiewicz (B.A. 1983), lieutenant governor of Connecticut (since 2019), secretary of state of Connecticut (1999–2010)
- Hibbard Casselberry (B.S. 1916), founder and first mayor of Casselberry, Florida, serving two terms.
- Dick Celeste (B.A. magna cum laude 1959), governor of Ohio (1983–91) (See also: #Diplomats)
- John Chafee (B.A. 1947), governor of Rhode Island (1962–69) (See also: #U.S. senators)
- Bill Clinton (J.D. 1973), governor of Arkansas (1983–92) (See also: #Presidents and vice presidents, royalty, other heads of state, prime ministers and ministers)
- Edwin Corning (B.A. 1906), Lieutenant Governor of New York
- Erastus Corning 2nd (B.A. 1932), mayor of Albany, New York
- Wilbur L. Cross (B.A. 1885, Ph.D. 1889), governor of Connecticut (1931–39), Yale professor of English
- Jack Dalrymple (B.A. 1970), 32nd governor of North Dakota (2010–16)
- John Davis (1787–1854), governor of Massachusetts (1834–35 and 1841–43)
- Mark Dayton (B.A. 1969), governor of Minnesota (2011–)
- Howard Dean (B.A. 1971), governor of Vermont (1991–2003)
- Justin Elicker (M.E.M./M.B.A. 2010), mayor of New Haven, Connecticut
- Stephen Clark Foster (1815–1898), first American mayor of Los Angeles, California
- Henry Huntly Haight (B.A. 1844), governor of California (1867–71)
- W. Averell Harriman (B.A. 1913), governor of New York (1955–58), U.S. ambassador to Russia (1943–46), ambassador to Britain (1946), secretary of commerce (1946–48)
- Tony Knowles (B.A. 1968), governor of Alaska (1994–2002), mayor of Anchorage, Alaska (1981–87)
- Ned Lamont (M.B.A. 1980), governor of Connecticut (2019–present)
- John Lindsay (B.A. 1944, LL.B. 1948), mayor of New York City
- William Livingston (B.A. 1741), first governor of New Jersey (1776–90) after the signing of the Declaration of Independence
- Gary Locke (B.A. 1972), governor of Washington (1997–2005) (thereby the first Chinese American governor in the United States)
- Return J. Meigs Jr. (B.A. 1785), 4th governor of Ohio (1810–14) (See also: #U.S. senators)
- Marshall F. Moore, 7th governor of Washington Territory
- Robert Moses (B.A. 1909), New York City parks commissioner, chairman of the New York State Council of Parks, head of the Triborough Bridge Authority
- George Pataki (B.A. 1967), mayor of Peekskill (1981–1984), governor of New York (1995–2006)
- Gifford Pinchot (Yale College graduate, 1889), governor of Pennsylvania (1923–27, 1931–35), first chief of the United States Forest Service (1905–10), and founder of and professor in Yale School of Forestry
- Winthrop Rockefeller (Class of 1935), attended Yale 1931–34; governor of Arkansas (1967–71)
- Carlos Romero Barceló (B.A. 1953), governor of Puerto Rico (1977–85) (See also: #Other legislators)
- William Scranton (B.A. 1939, J.D. 1946), governor of Pennsylvania (1963–67), U.S. ambassador to the United Nations (1976–77), member of the United States House of Representatives
- Israel Smith (Yale College graduate, 1781), governor of Vermont (1807–08), member of the United States House of Representatives and member of the United States Senate
- Robert Taft (B.A. 1953), governor of Ohio (1999–2007)
- James Camp Tappan (B.A. 1845), speaker of the Arkansas House of Representatives (1897–99)
- Samuel J. Tilden (B.A. 1837, LL.D. 1875), governor of New York (1875–76), Democratic nominee for President in 1876
- Lowell Weicker (B.A. 1953), governor of Connecticut (1990–94) (See also: #U.S. senators)
- Anthony A. Williams (B.A. 1979), mayor of Washington, D.C., 1999–2007
- Pete Wilson (B.A. 1956), governor of California (1991–99) (See also: #U.S. senators)

=== Cabinet members, chairpersons/administrators and advisers ===
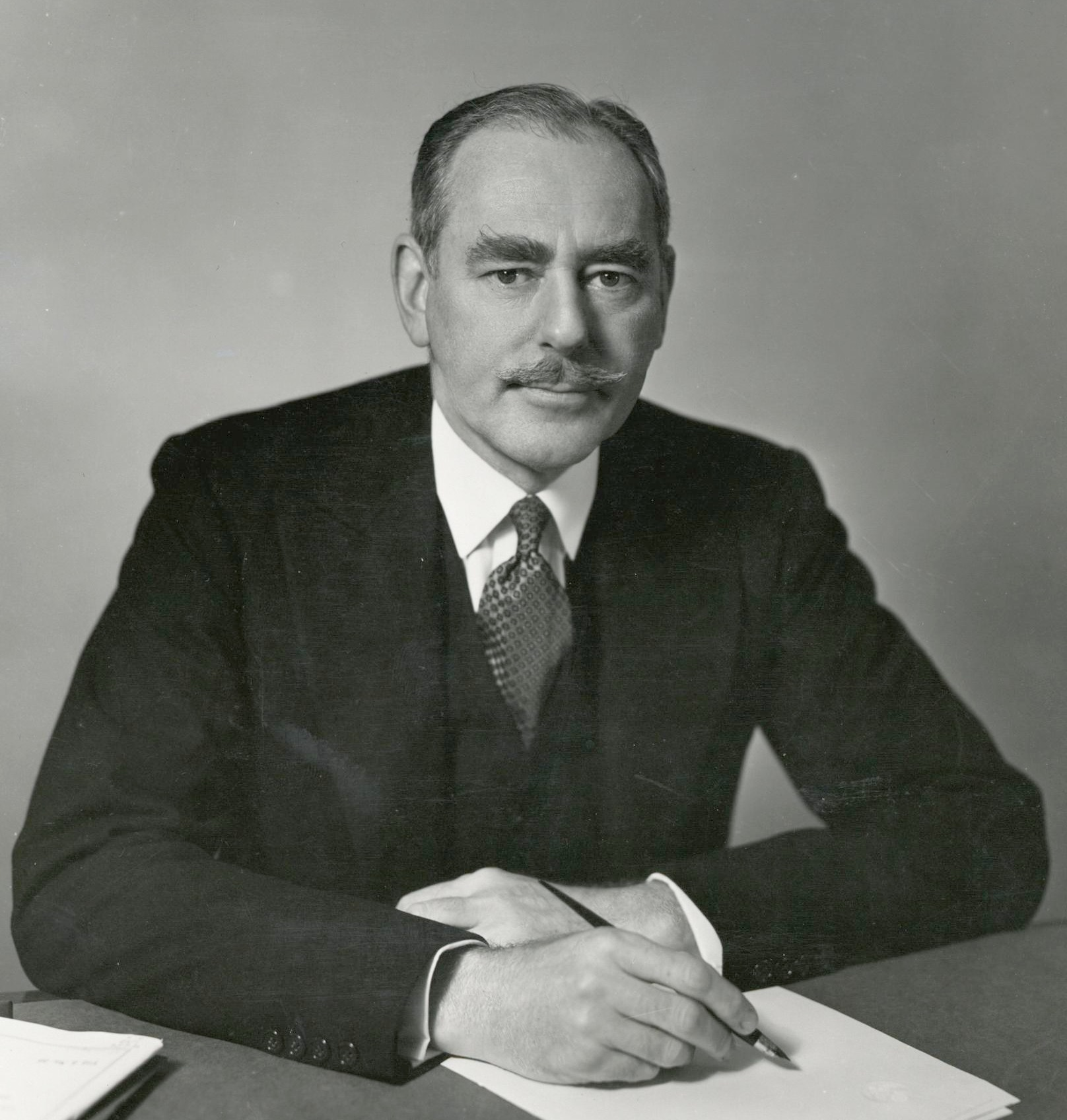
Dean Acheson

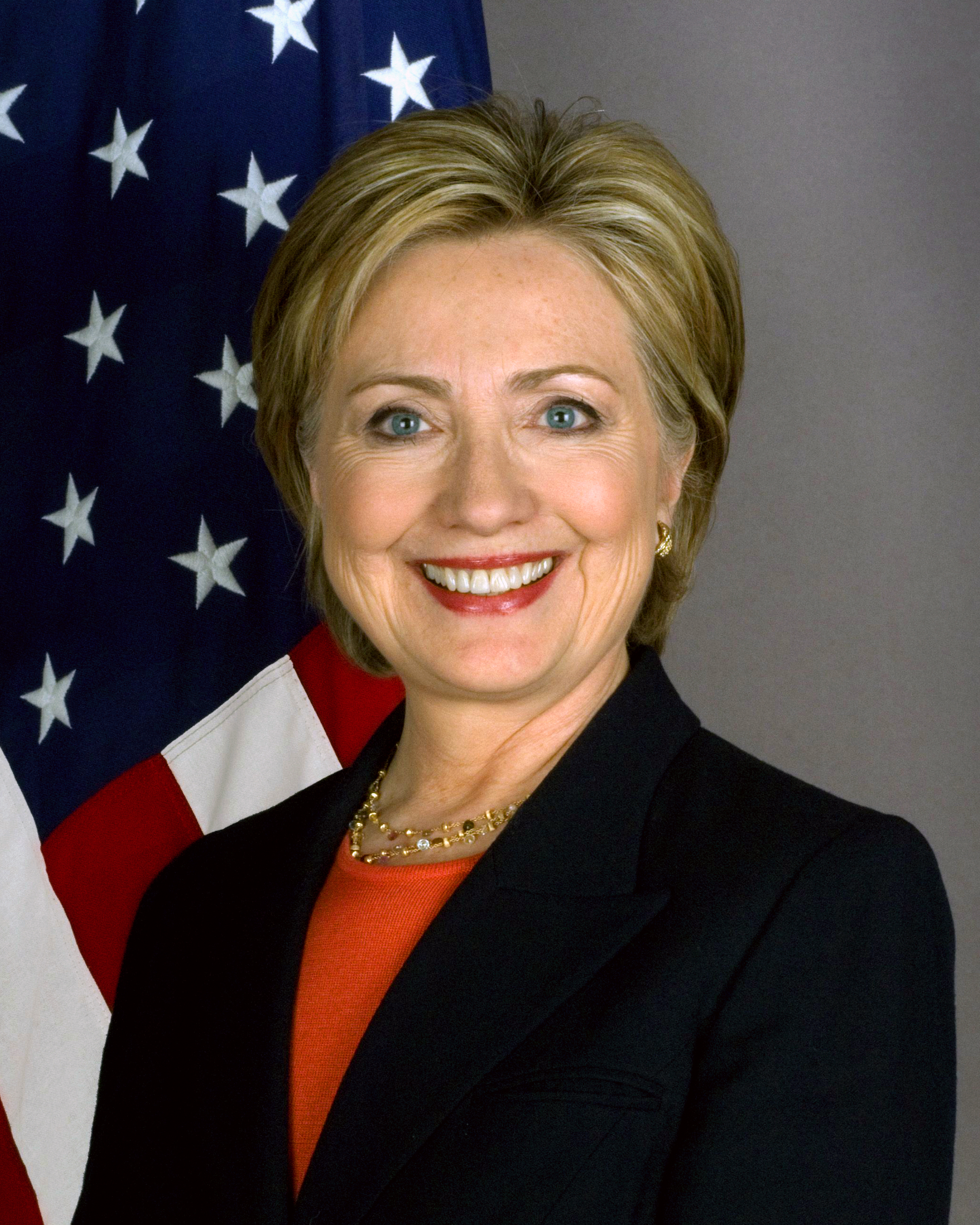
Hillary Clinton

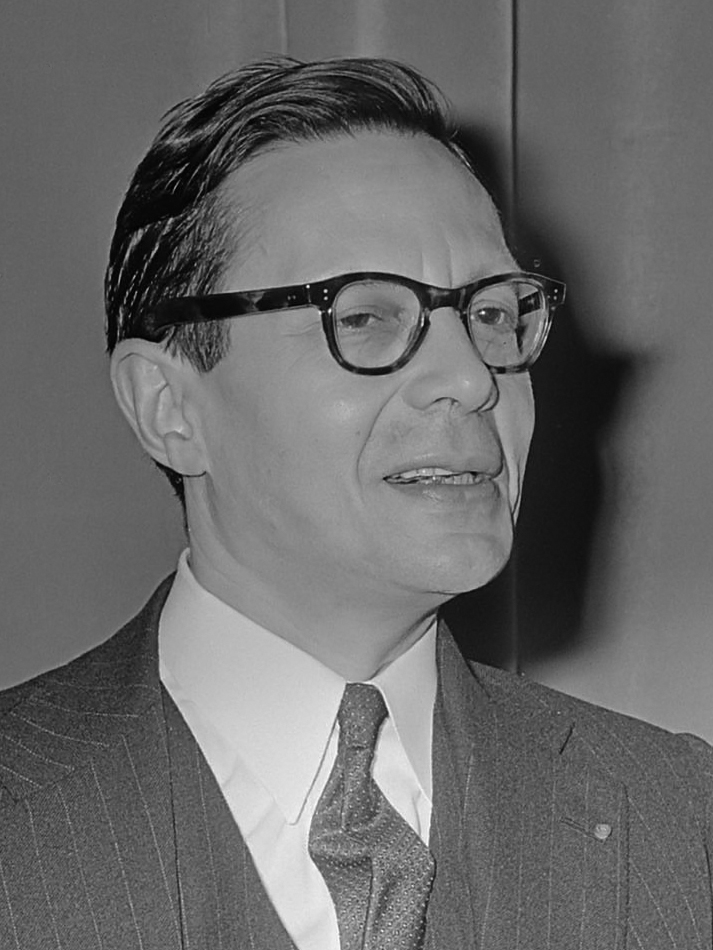
Robert Marjolin

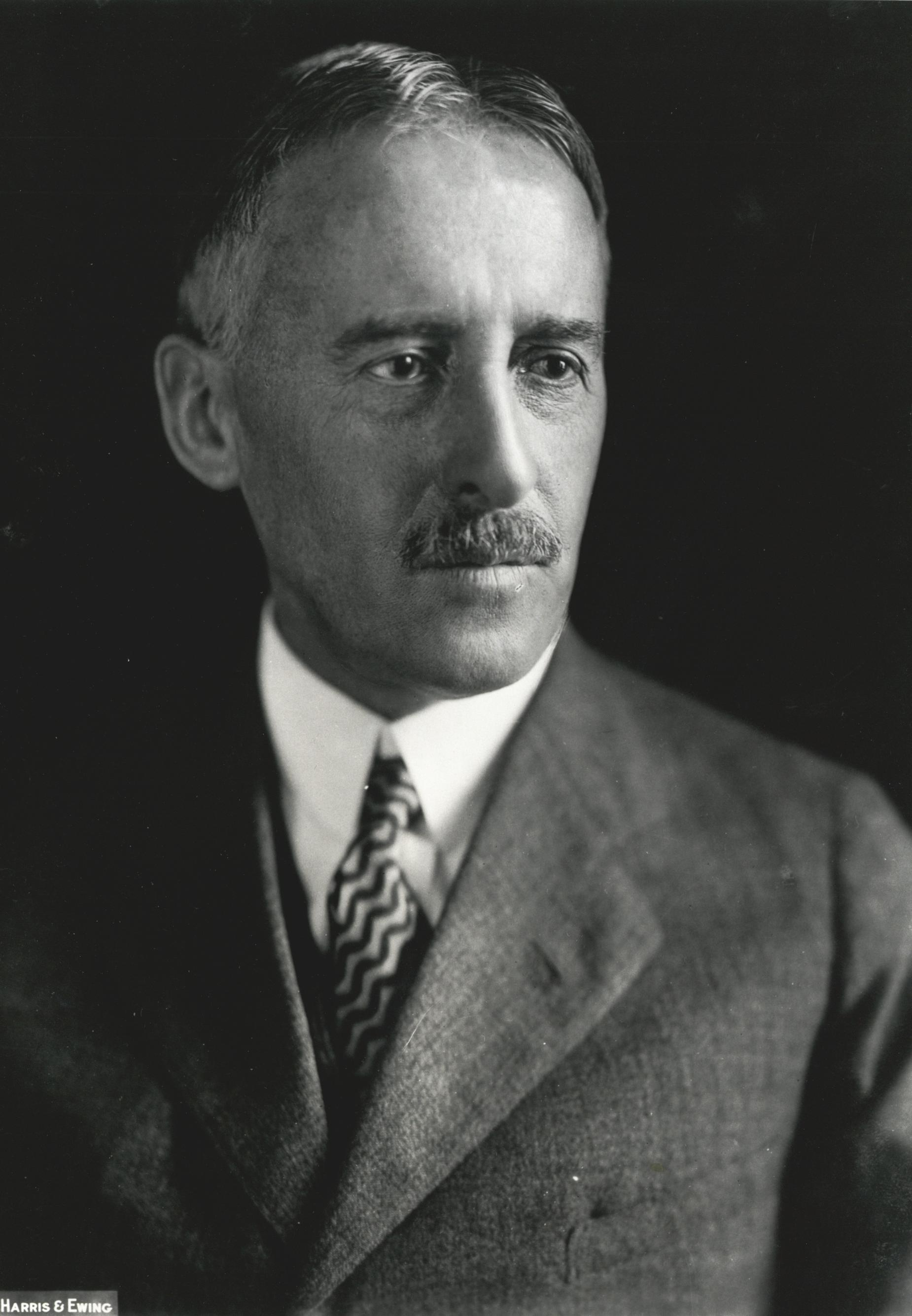
Henry Stimson

The following have worked within the cabinet for their respective governments.

- Dean Acheson (B.A. 1915), U.S. secretary of state (1949–1953)
- James Jesus Angleton (B.A. 1941), chief of Counterintelligence Staff for the Central Intelligence Agency (1954–1974)
- Les Aspin (B.A. 1960), U.S. secretary of defense (1993–1994)
- Michael J. Astrue (B.A. 1978), commissioner of the Social Security Administration (2007–2013)
- Scott Bessent (B.A. 1984), U.S. secretary of the treasury (2025–present)
- McGeorge Bundy (B.A. 1940), National Security advisor (1961–1966)
- Jay Carney (B.A. 1987), White House press secretary (2011–2014)
- Ash Carter (B.S. 1976), U.S. secretary of defense (2015–2017), professor at Harvard Kennedy School
- John Chafee (B.A. 1947), U.S. secretary of the Navy (1969–1972) (also listed under Senators and Governors)
- Fredrick Chien (M.A. 1959, Ph.D. 1962), minister of foreign affairs of the Republic of China (1990–1996), speaker of the National Assembly (1996–1999), President of the Control Yuan (1999–2005)
- John M. Clayton (1815), U.S. secretary of state (1849–1850) (also listed under Senators)
- Hillary Clinton (J.D. 1973), U.S. secretary of state (2009–2013) (also listed under Senators)
- William H. Donaldson (B.A. 1954), chairman of the U.S. Securities and Exchange Commission (2003–2005), chair of the board of directors of the New York Stock Exchange (1991–1995), founder and 1st dean of the Yale School of Management (1975–1980), co-founder of Donaldson, Lufkin & Jenrette
- William M. Evarts (1837), U.S. secretary of state (1877–1881) (also listed under Senators)
- Olu Falae, finance minister of Nigeria (1989–1991), presidential candidate (1999)
- David Frum (B.A. and M.A. 1982), White House speechwriter under President George W. Bush, who coined the phrase "Axis of Evil"
- Roswell Gilpatric (B.A. 1928), U.S. deputy secretary of defense (1961–1964), presiding partner of the Cravath, Swaine & Moore (1966–1977)
- T. Keith Glennan (B.S. 1927), administrator of NASA (1958–1961)
- Mauricio Gonzalez Sfeir (B.A. 1978), secretary of energy of Bolivia (1995–1999)
- Austan Goolsbee (B.A. 1991, M.A. 1991), chairman of the President's Council of Economic Advisors (2010–2011), professor of economics at University of Chicago
- Porter Goss (B.A. 1960), director of the Central Intelligence Agency (2004–2006)
- Stephen Hadley (J.D. 1972), National Security advisor (2005–2009), deputy National Security advisor (2001–2005)
- Jamie Harrison (B.A. 1998), former chairman of South Carolina Democratic Party and Democratic National Committee
- Robert S. Ingersoll (1937), U.S. deputy secretary of state (1974–1976)
- John Kerry (B.A. 1966), U.S. secretary of state (2013–2017) (also listed under Senators)
- Lina Khan (J.D. 2017), former commissioner and chair of the Federal Trade Commission
- Lewis Libby (B.A. 1972), former aide to Vice President Dick Cheney, principal figure in the Plame Affair
- Robert Marjolin (Economics, 1934), French Marshall Plan implementer, European commissioner (1958–1967)
- William McChesney Martin (B.A. ca. 1926), chair of the Federal Reserve (1951–1970)
- Edwin Meese (B.A. 1953), U.S. attorney general (1985–1988)
- Steven Mnuchin (B.A. 1985), U.S. secretary of the treasury (2017–2021)
- Rogers Morton (B.A.), U.S. secretary of commerce (1975–1976) and U.S. secretary of tnterior (1971–1975)
- John Negroponte (B.A. 1960), U.S. deputy secretary of state (2007–2009) and director of National Intelligence (2005–2007)
- Urjit Patel, Governor of the Reserve Bank of India (2016–2018)
- Wilbur Ross (B.A.), secretary of commerce (2017–2021)
- Robert Rubin (LL.B. 1964), U.S. secretary of the treasury (1995–1999), director of the National Economic Council (1993–1995)
- Henry L. Stimson (B.A. 1888), U.S. secretary of war (1911–1913; 1940–1945), U.S. secretary of state (1929–1933), governor-general of the Philippines (1927–1929)
- Jake Sullivan (B.A. 1998, J.D. 2003), National Security advisor (2021–2025)
- Alphonso Taft (B.A. 1833, Law), U.S. attorney general (1876–1877), U.S. secretary of war (1876)
- Strobe Talbott (B.A. 1968), U.S. deputy secretary of state (1994–2001), president of the Brookings Institution (2002–2017)
- Cyrus Vance (B.A. 1939, LL.B. 1942), U.S. secretary of state (1977–1980)
- Janet Yellen (Ph.D. 1971), U.S. secretary of the treasury (2021–2025), chair of the Federal Reserve (2014–2018)

=== Diplomats ===
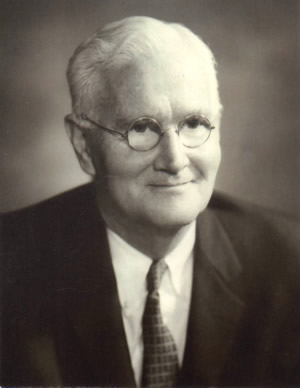
Hiram Bingham IV

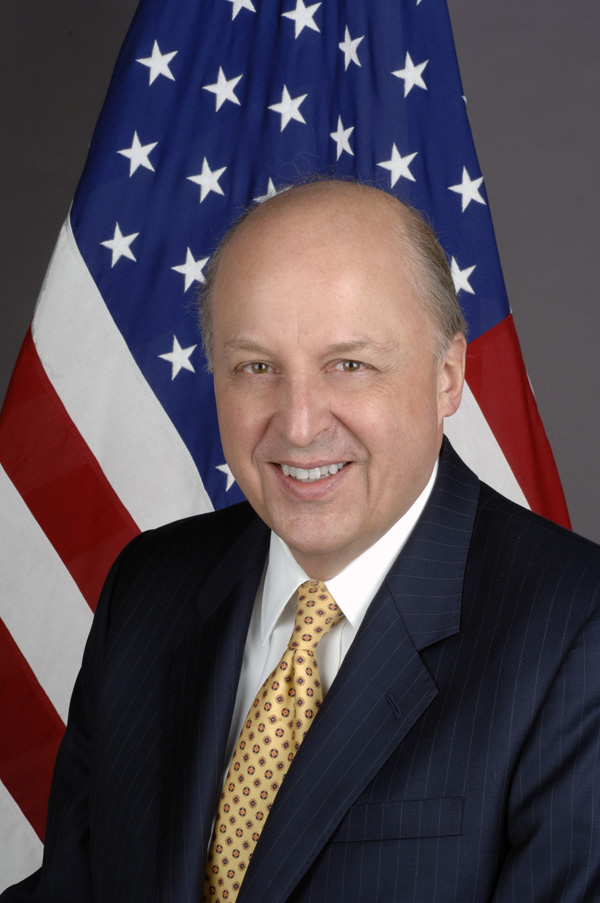
John Negroponte

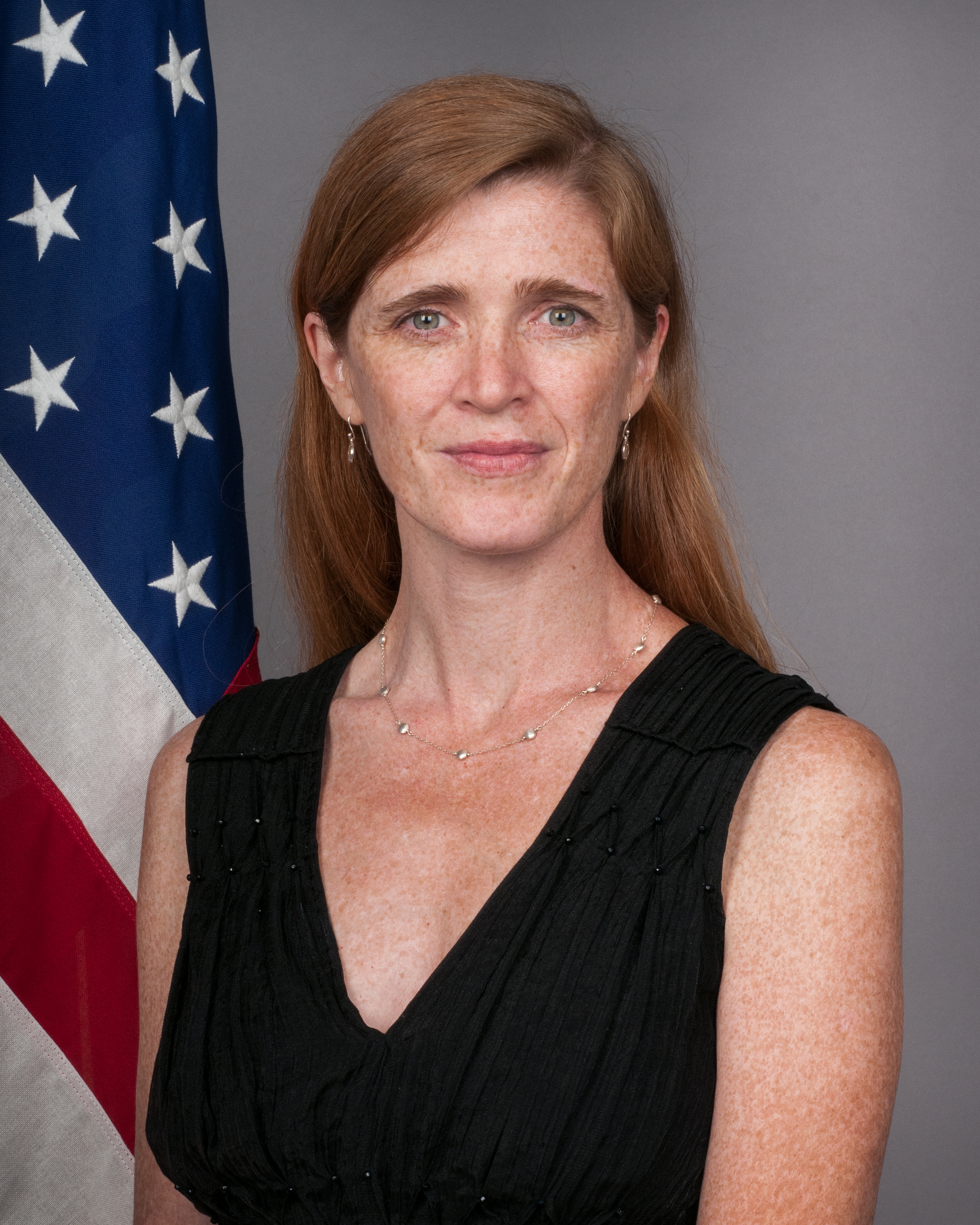
Samantha Power

- Roy L. Austin, U.S. ambassador to Trinidad and Tobago (2001–09)
- Hiram Bingham IV, U.S. vice consul in Marseille, France (1940–41)
- Bradford Bishop, former Foreign Service officer, indicted for murder, still at large
- L. Paul Bremer (B.A. 1963), U.S. ambassador
- Dick Celeste (B.A. magna cum laude 1959), U.S. ambassador to India (1997–2001)
- Robert P. De Vecchi (B.A. 1952, L.H.D.H honorary 2005), president emeritus of the International Rescue Committee
- Donald Burnham Ensenat (BA, 1968), U.S. ambassador to Brunei (1992–1993); U.S. chief of protocol (2001–2007)
- Carl Gershman (B.A. magna cum laude 1965), U.N. representative and National Endowment for Democracy president
- Donald Gips (MBA), U.S. ambassador to South Africa (2009–13)
- Gordon Gray III (B.A. 1978), U.S. ambassador to Tunisia (2009–12)
- David Huebner (J.D.), U.S. ambassador to New Zealand and Samoa (2009–14)
- Rashad Hussain (J.D.), U.S. special envoy to the Organisation of Islamic Cooperation
- Edgard Kagan, U.S. ambassador to Malaysia (2024–present)
- Howard Leach (B.A.), U.S. ambassador to France (2001–05)
- Gary Locke (B.A. 1972), U.S. ambassador to China (2011–14)
- Robert D. McCallum Jr., U.S. ambassador to Australia (2006–09)
- John Negroponte (B.A. 1960), U.S. ambassador to the United Nations (2001–04) and deputy secretary of state (2007–09)
- John O'Leary (B.A. 1969), U.S. ambassador to Chile (1998–2001)
- Samantha Power (B.A. 1992), U.S. ambassador to the United Nations (2013–17)
- Clark T. Randt Jr., U.S. ambassador to China (2001–09)
- Philip T. Reeker (B.A. 1986), U.S. ambassador to Macedonia (2008–11)
- Ogden Reid, U.S. ambassador to Israel (1959–61)
- Charles Rivkin (B.A. 1984), U.S. ambassador to France and Monaco (2009–13)
- Herbert Salzman, U.S. ambassador to the Organization for Economic Co-operation and Development
- Andrew Schapiro (B.A. 1985), U.S. ambassador to the Czech Republic (2014–17)
- William Scranton (B.A. 1939, J.D. 1946), U.S. ambassador to the United Nations (1976–77)
- Derek Shearer (B.A.), U.S. ambassador to Finland (1994–97)
- R. Douglas Stuart Jr. (J.D. 1946), U.S. ambassador to Norway (1994–89)
- Richard Swett (B.A. 1979), U.S. ambassador to Denmark (1998–2001)
- Katherine Tai (B.A.), U.S. trade representative (2020–)
- David Thorne (B.A. 1966), U.S. ambassador to Italy (2009–13), U.S. ambassador to San Marino (2009–13)
- Peter Tufo (J.D.), U.S. ambassador to Hungary (1997–2001)
- Kori Udovički (Ph.D. 1999 in Economics), Governor of the National Bank of Serbia (2003–04), assistant secretary-general of United Nations (2007–)
- Frederick Vreeland (B.A. 1951), U.S. ambassador to Morocco (1992–93)

=== Judges and attorneys ===
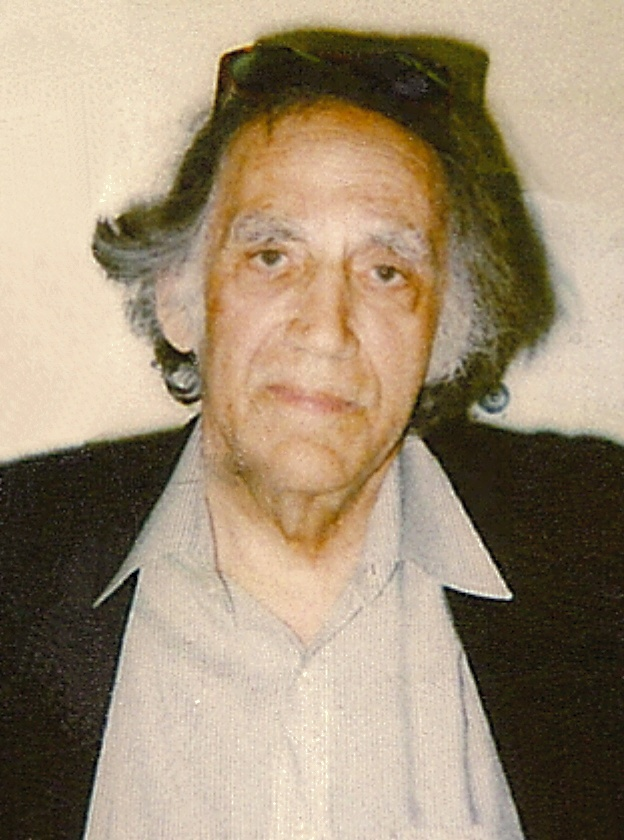
William Kunstler

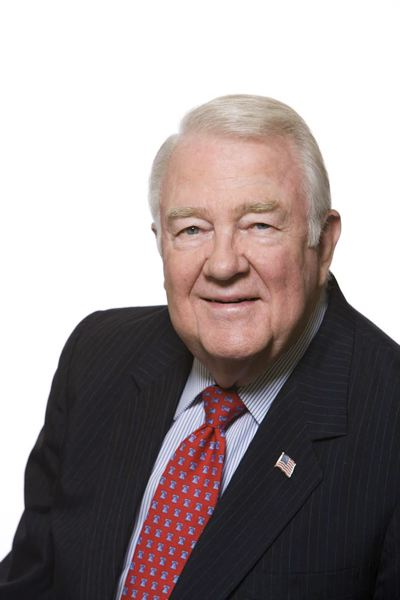
Edwin Meese

- Cecilia Altonaga (J.D. 1986), federal judge, first Cuban American woman to be appointed as a federal judge in the United States
- R. Lanier Anderson III (B.A., 1958), federal judge on the United States Court of Appeals for the Eleventh Circuit
- Richard S. Arnold (B.A., 1957), late judge of the Eighth Circuit Court of Appeals, federal courthouse in Little Rock named in his honor
- Christopher L. Avery (B.A., 1893; LL.B. 1897), associate justice of the Connecticut Supreme Court
- Joaquin Avila (B.A, 1970), voting rights advocate and MacArthur Fellow
- Samuel H. Blackmer (B.A., 1924), Associate Justice of the Vermont Supreme Court
- Richard Blumenthal (J.D.), Connecticut attorney general (1991–2011)
- David Sherman Boardman (B.A. 1793), Connecticut judge and congressman
- David Boies (LL.B.. 1966), famous lawyer (Microsoft antitrust, Bush v. Gore, Napster v. RIAA)
- Steven Brill (B.A. 1972, J.D. 1975), founder of Court TV and The American Lawyer
- José A. Cabranes (J.D. 1965), judge on the United States Court of Appeals for the Second Circuit
- George B. Daniels (born 1953), federal judge
- Benjamin Darrow (J.D., ca. 1890), New York district attorney
- Daryl Dawson (L.L.M.), justice of the High Court of Australia
- John T. Downey, judge, former CIA flyer imprisoned in China 1952–73
- Marc Stuart Dreier (B.A. 1972), lawyer and felon
- Tali Farhadian (born 1974 or 1975), former US federal prosecutor
- Dwight Foster (B.A. 1848), Massachusetts attorney general and associate justice of the Massachusetts Supreme Judicial Court
- Michael Furst (B.A. 1876), Brooklyn lawyer
- Richard L. Gabriel (B.A. 1984), associate justice of the Colorado Supreme Court
- James Knoll Gardner (B.A. 1962), former federal judge for the U.S. District of Eastern Pennsylvania
- Ernest W. Gibson III (B.A. 1951), associate justice of the Vermont Supreme Court
- John P. Hampton (1804), chief justice of the Supreme Court of Mississippi
- Nathan L. Hecht (B.A. 1971), chief justice of the Texas Supreme Court
- James Kent (B.A. 1781), "father of American equity jurisprudence", Chancellor of New York
- Anthony Quinton Keasbey (B.A. 1843), 25-year United States attorney for the district of New Jersey
- Denison Kitchel (B.A. 1930), attorney in Phoenix, Arizona, and national campaign manager for Barry M. Goldwater in 1964
- William Kunstler (B.A. 1941), civil liberties lawyer
- Arthur Mag, lawyer, legal counsel to Harry S. Truman
- Burke Marshall (B.A. 1943, LL.B. 1951), assistant attorney general
- Edwin Meese (B.A. 1953), former United States attorney general
- John W. Nields Jr. (B.A. 1964), former chief counsel to House Select Committee investigating Iran–Contra affair
- Ann Olivarius (B.A., 1977, J.D. and M.B.A., 1986), feminist attorney and managing partner, McAllister Olivarius
- Barrington Daniels Parker Jr. (B.A. 1965, J.D. 1969), United States Court of Appeals for the Second Circuit
- Myrna Perez (B.A. 1996), United States Court of Appeals for the Second Circuit
- Henry L. Sherman (B.A. 1890), justice of the New York Supreme Court
- Jerry Edwin Smith (B.A. 1969, J.D. 1972), United States Court of Appeals for the Fifth Circuit
- Stephen Susman (B.A. 1962), plaintiffs attorney and a founding partner of Susman Godfrey
- Robert W. Sweet (LL.B. 1948), judge of New York Southern District
- Thomas Thacher (B.A. 1871), founder of prominent law firm Simpson Thacher & Bartlett and first president of the Yale Club
- Thomas Day Thacher (B.A. 1904), United States Solicitor General and federal judge
- Eric Tung (B.A. 2006), judge on the United States Court of Appeals for the Ninth Circuit
- Cyrus Vance Jr. (B.A. 1978), New York County District Attorney
- Arthur A. Wilder, justice of the Hawaii Supreme Court

=== Activists ===
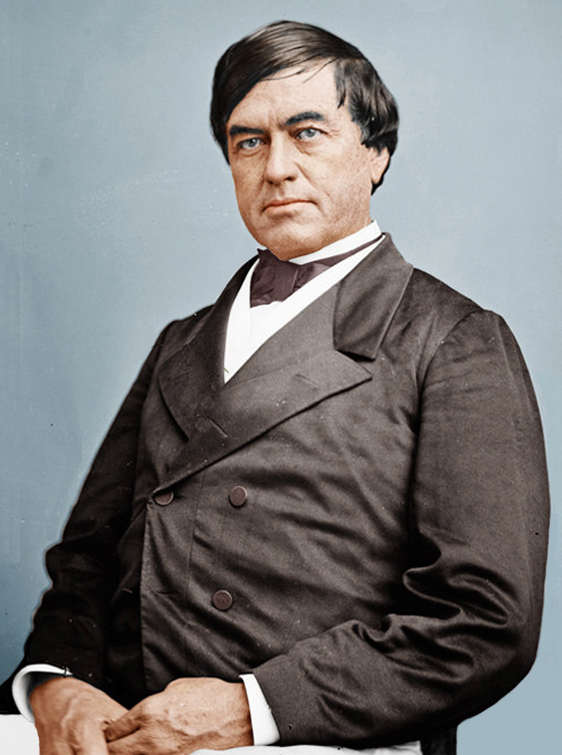
Cassius Marcellus Clay

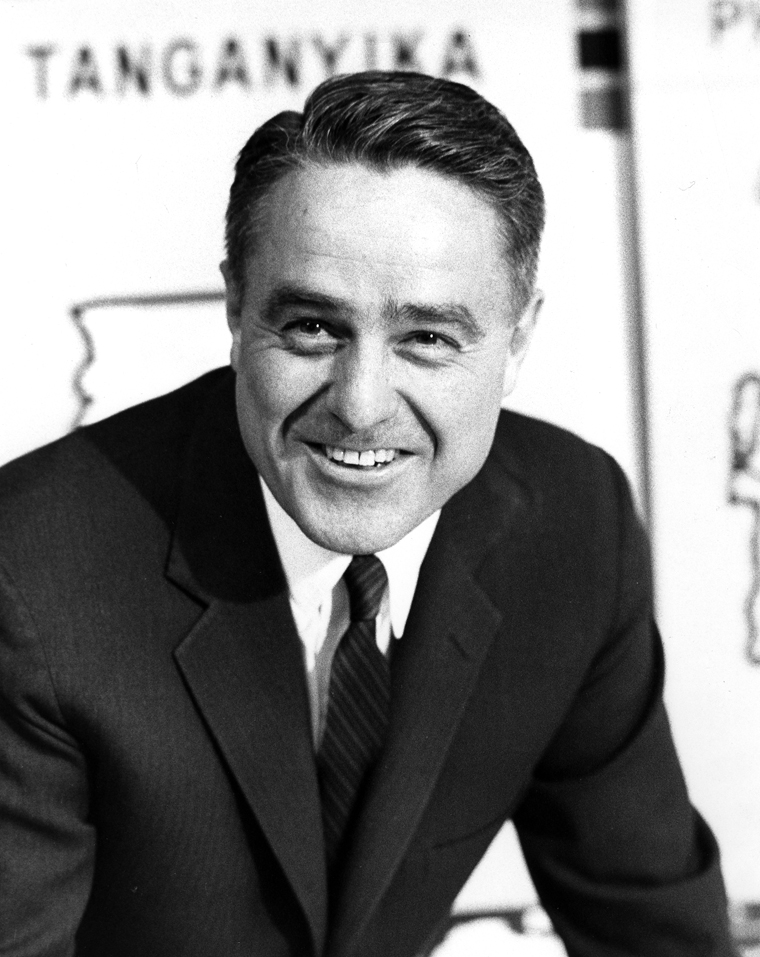
Sargent Shriver

- Leonard Bacon (B.A. 1820), abolitionist
- Aditi Banerjee, attorney, writer and minority (Hindu) rights activist in the US
- Cassius Marcellus Clay (B.A. 1832), abolitionist; namesake of Cassius Marcellus Clay Sr., whose son, boxer Cassius Marcellus Clay Jr., took the name Muhammad Ali
- Rev. William Sloane Coffin Jr. (B.D. 1956), chaplain of Yale (1958–75), senior minister of Riverside Church in New York, civil and political rights activist, author
- Severn Cullis-Suzuki (B.S. 2002), environmental activist, speaker, television host, and author; member of Kofi Annan's Special Advisory Council (United Nations)
- David Dellinger (B.A. 1936), conscientious objector, member of the Chicago Seven
- Jeremiah Evarts (B.A. 1802), author, editor, activist, opponent of the Indian Removal Act of 1830
- Jodi Grant (B.A. 1990), executive director of the Afterschool Alliance
- Sayed Rahmatullah Hashemi, Taliban spokesman
- Bruce W. Klunder (B.D. 1961), Presbyterian minister, civil rights activist with C.O.R.E., killed during protest against segregated schools in Cleveland, Ohio
- Graciela Sanchez, social justice activist
- Barry Scheck (B.S., 1971), co-founded the Innocence Project
- Sargent Shriver (B.A. 1938, LL.B. 1941), main organizer and first director of the Peace Corps; California politician and businessman; husband of Eunice Kennedy; father of Maria Shriver (news journalist and former wife of Governor Arnold Schwarzenegger) and Bobby Shriver (Yale B.A. 1976)
- Ron Sider (B.D., 1967, Ph.D. 1969), theologian and activist; president of Evangelicals For Social Action and professor at Palmer Theological Seminary
- Jared Taylor (B.A., 1973), author, editor, activist, founder of the New Century Foundation
- Phyllis Ann Wallace (1948), economist, civil rights activist
- Brian Wallach (B.A., 2003), founder of I AM ALS
- Y.C. James Yen (B.A. 1918; M.A. (honorary) 1928), founder of Chinese Mass Education Movement and Rural Reconstruction Movement

=== Political commentators ===
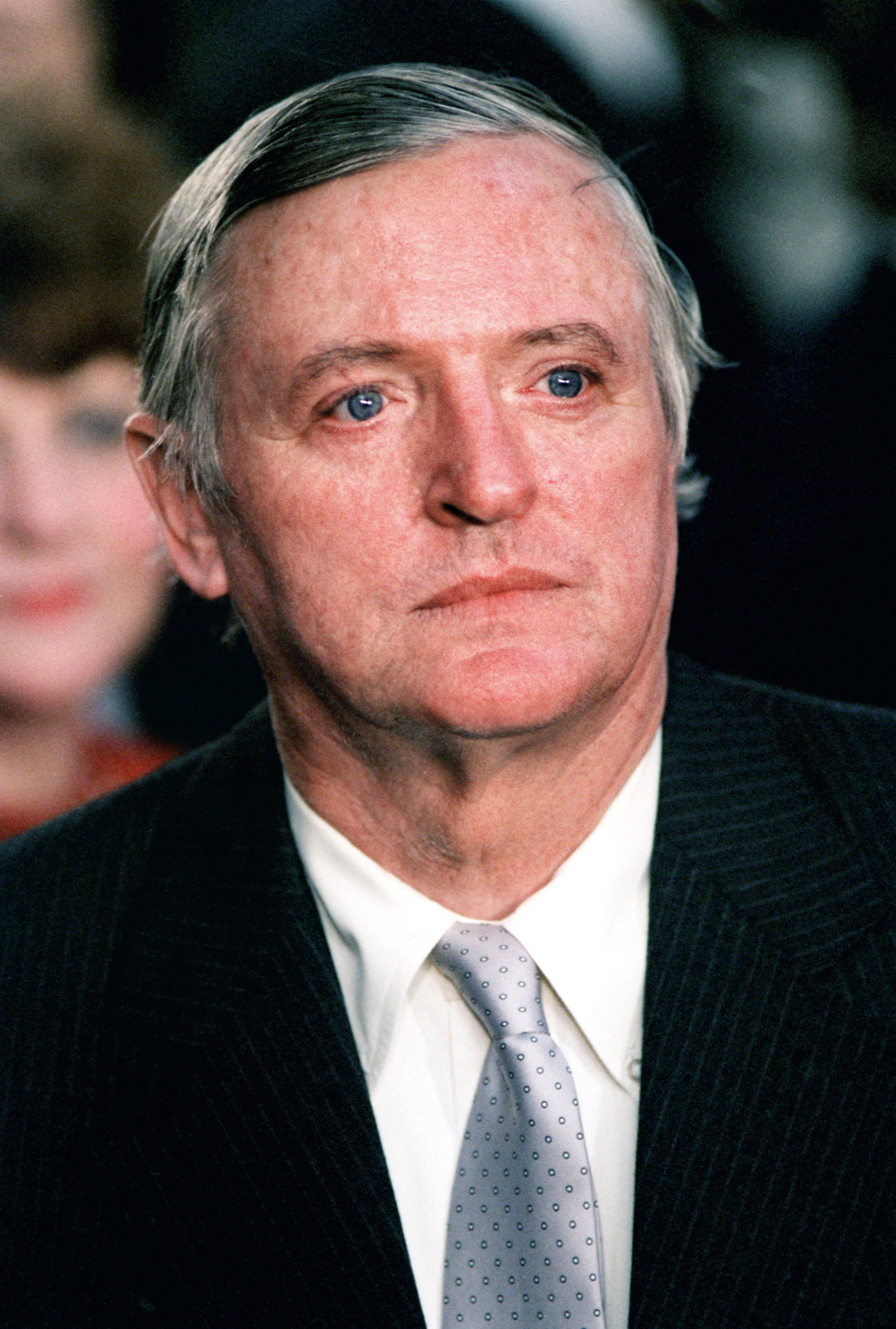
William F. Buckley

- John P. Avlon (B.A. 1996), author, political commentator, CNN Senior Political Analyst and former editor-in-chief of The Daily Beast
- Christopher Buckley (B.A. 1975), political pundit, columnist, author of Thank You for Smoking
- William F. Buckley (B.A. 1950), political pundit, founder of the National Review, host of public affairs television show Firing Line
- David Gergen (B.A. 1963), political pundit, worked as an advisor for the Republican and Democratic presidential administrations of Richard Nixon, Gerald Ford, Ronald Reagan and Bill Clinton
- Michael J. Knowles (B.A. 2012), political pundit, author of Speechless, host of political podcast on The Daily Wire
- Andrés Martinez (B.A. 1988), editorial page editor of the Los Angeles Times
- Marvin Olasky (B.A. 1971), editor-in-chief of WORLD magazine
- Kenneth M. Pollack (B.A. 1988), Middle East expert, author, fellow of the Brookings Institution
- Gideon Rose (B.A. 1985), author, editor-in-chief of Foreign Affairs
- Sean Trende (B.A. 1995), Senior Elections Analyst for RealClearPolitics, co-author of The Almanac of American Politics
- Fareed Zakaria (B.A. 1986), political pundit, author, host of public affairs show Foreign Exchange

=== Other ===
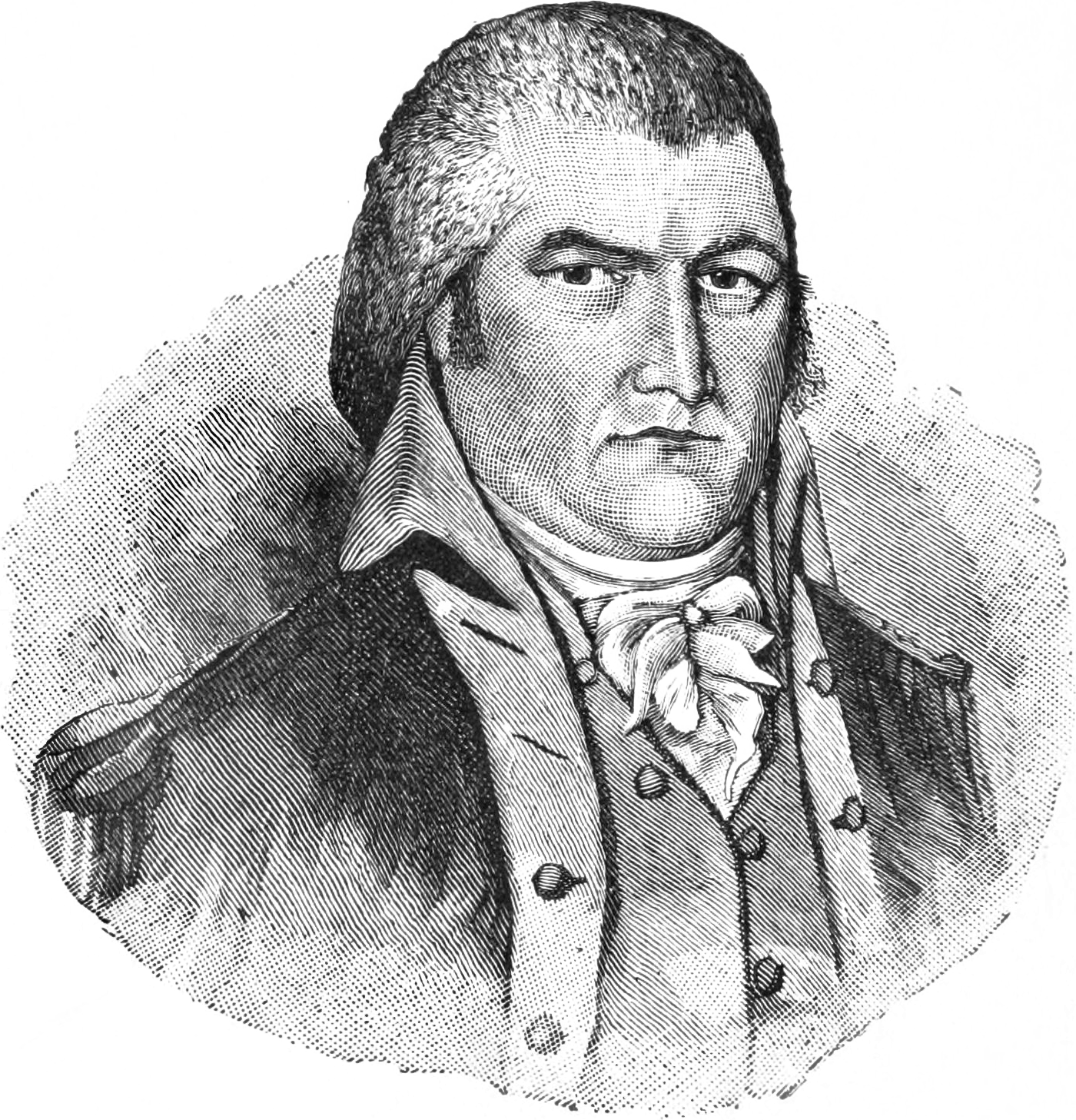
Moses Cleaveland

- Matthew Adler (B.A. 1984 and J.D. 1991), law professor
- Algernon Sydney Biddle (1847–1891), lawyer and law professor at the University of Pennsylvania Law School
- Moses Cleaveland (B.A. 1777), founder of Cleveland, Ohio
- Manasseh Cutler (B.A. 1765), co-author of the Northwest Ordinance of 1787, member of the Ohio Company of Associates (the first non-Native American settlement in Ohio), Federalist congressman from Massachusetts (1801–1805)
- John Hart Ely (J.D. 1963), legal scholar
- James Gadsden (B.A. 1806), namesake of the Gadsden Purchase, in which the United States purchased from Mexico the land that became parts of Arizona and New Mexico
- Tappan Gregory (B.A. 1910), president of the American Bar Association in 1947–48
- Quintin Johnstone (J.S.D. 1951), legal scholar
- Clarence King (Ph.D. 1862), founder of the U.S. Geological Survey
- James Wadsworth (1787), founder of Geneseo, New York, and leading pioneer and community leader of the Genesee Valley
- Amy Wax (B.S. 1975), Robert Mundheim Professor of Law at the University of Pennsylvania Law School

== Military ==
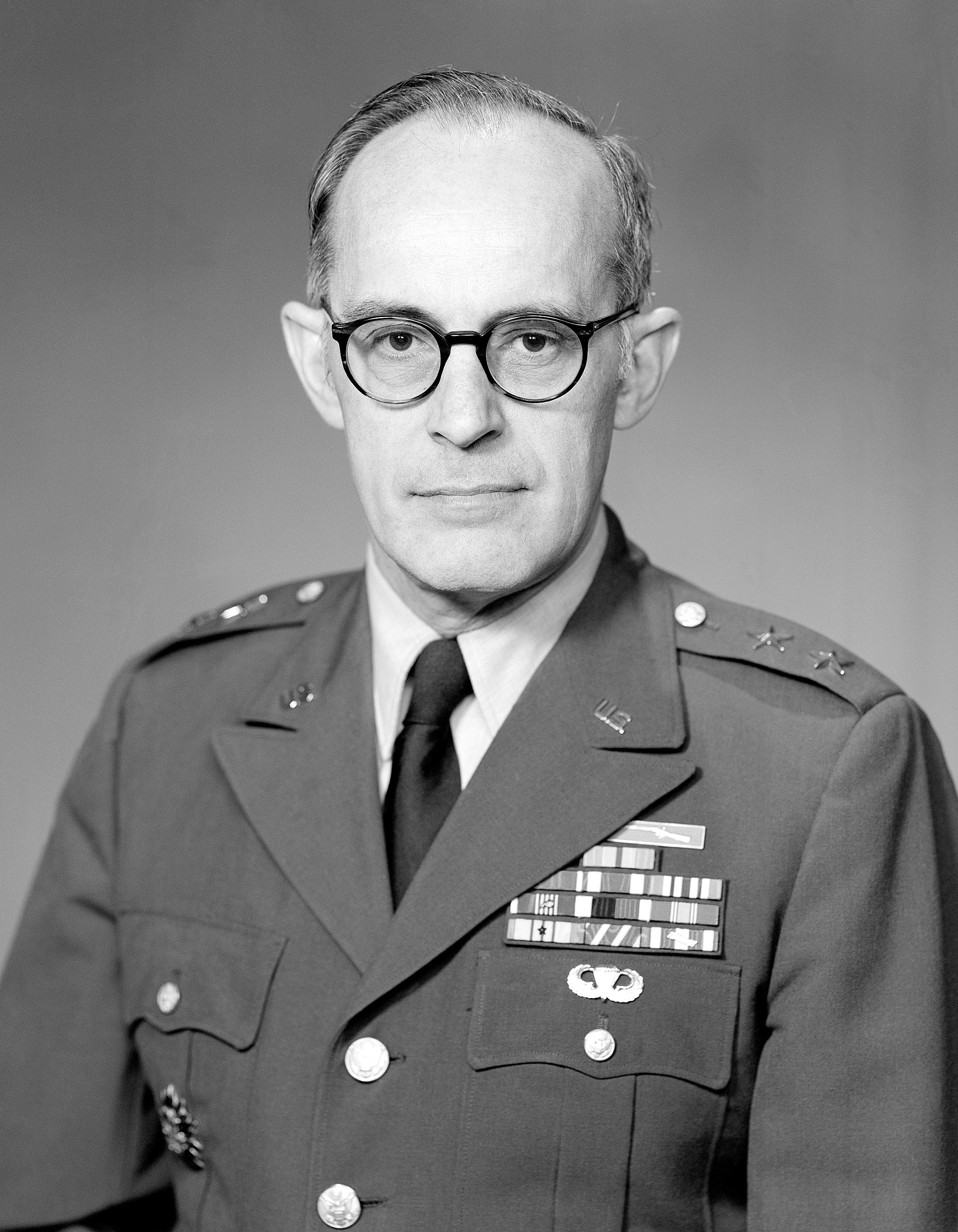
William Odom

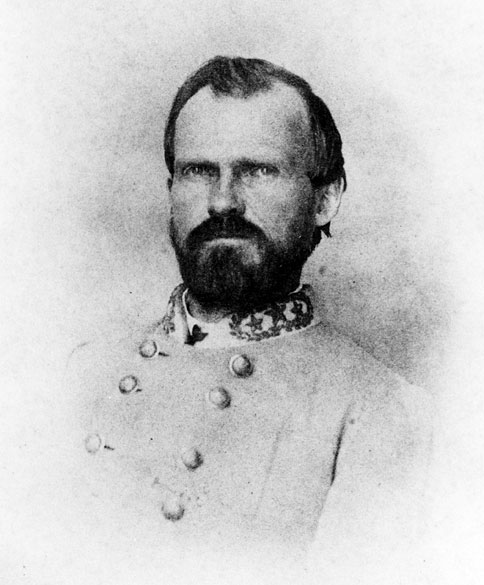
James Camp Tappan

- John Brown (B.A. 1771), accuser of Benedict Arnold
- Henry B. Carrington (1845), Union army general in the American Civil War
- A. Peter Dewey, first American killed in the Vietnam War, in 1945
- William B. Goggins, rear admiral of the United States Navy
- Nathan Hale (B.A. 1773), America's first spy, executed by the British for espionage in 1776; his last words are often quoted: "I only regret that I have but one life to lose for my country."
- Rene Edward De Russy Hoyle, army general
- David Humphreys (B.A. 1771), aide-de-camp to George Washington
- Lewis Nixon, army officer featured in Band of Brothers
- William Odom, director of the National Security Agency
- Jarvis Offutt (1917), World War I aviator, namesake of Offutt Air Force Base
- John Paterson (B.A. 1762), major general in the American Revolution and congressman from New York
- John Francisco Richards II (B.A. 1917), World War I aviator, namesake of Richards-Gebaur Air Force Base
- George W. Roberts (B.A. 1857), Union Army colonel killed at the Battle of Stones River during the American Civil War
- Linda Spoonster Schwartz (DrPH), Vietnam War veteran, former assistant secretary for policy and planning at the Department of Veterans Affairs
- George Fairlamb Smith (B.A. 1858), Union Army colonel and Pennsylvania National Guard judge advocate general
- Richard K. Sutherland (B.A. 1916), Army general during World War II
- Benjamin Tallmadge (B.A. 1773), head of General George Washington's Culper spy ring on Long Island and New York
- James Camp Tappan (B.A. 1845), Confederate army general in the American Civil War (See also: #Governors, other state officials and mayors)
- Decius Wadsworth (1785), colonel, U.S. Army War of 1812 and chief of ordnance 1815–21
- Nathan Whiting (B.A. 1743), colonel of Connecticut troops during the French and Indian War; nephew of university president Thomas Clap
- David Wooster (B.A. 1738), brigadier general in the American Revolutionary War; namesake of Wooster, Ohio, The College of Wooster, and the Wooster School

== Religion ==
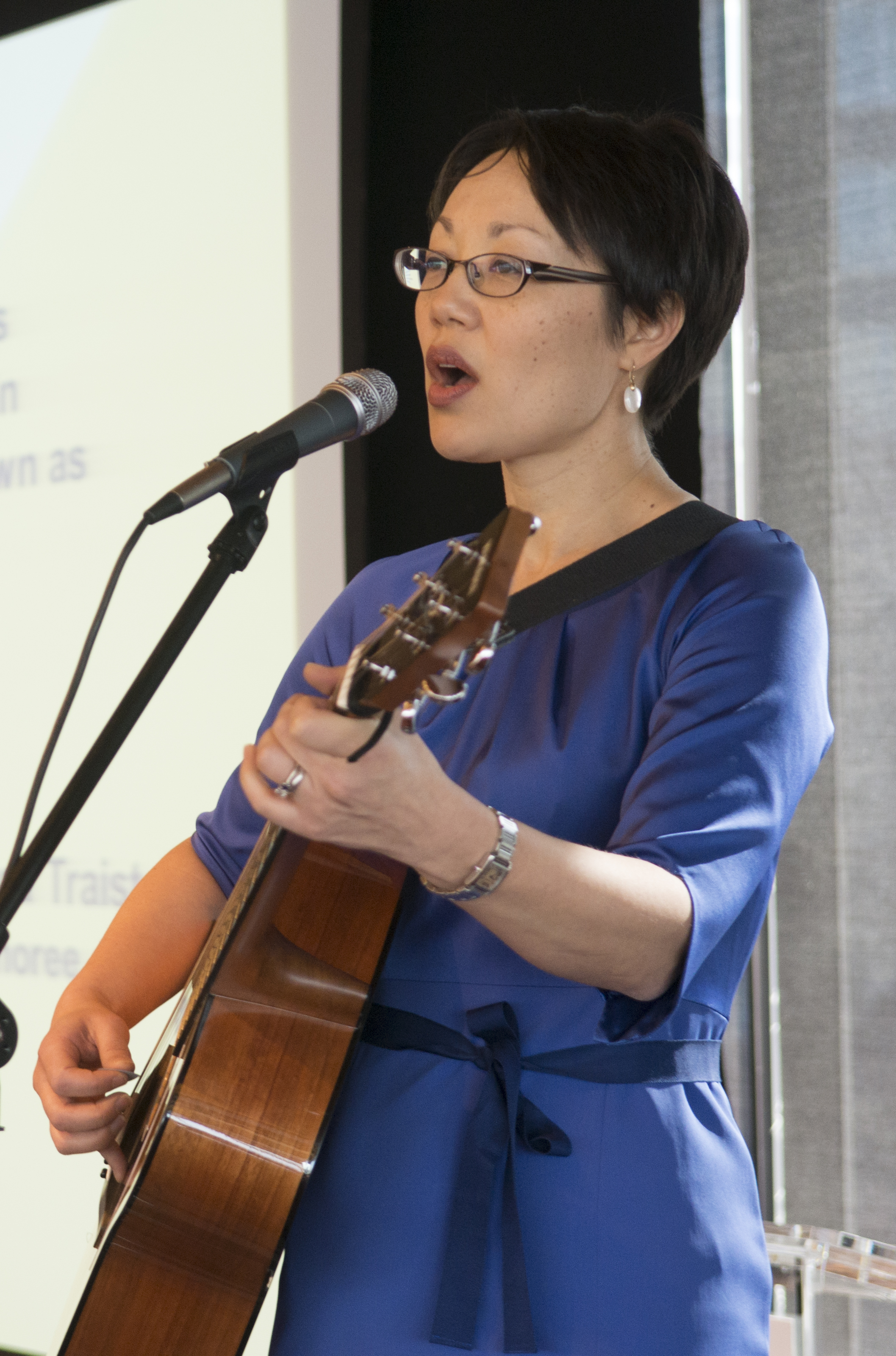
Rabbi Angela Warnick Buchdahl

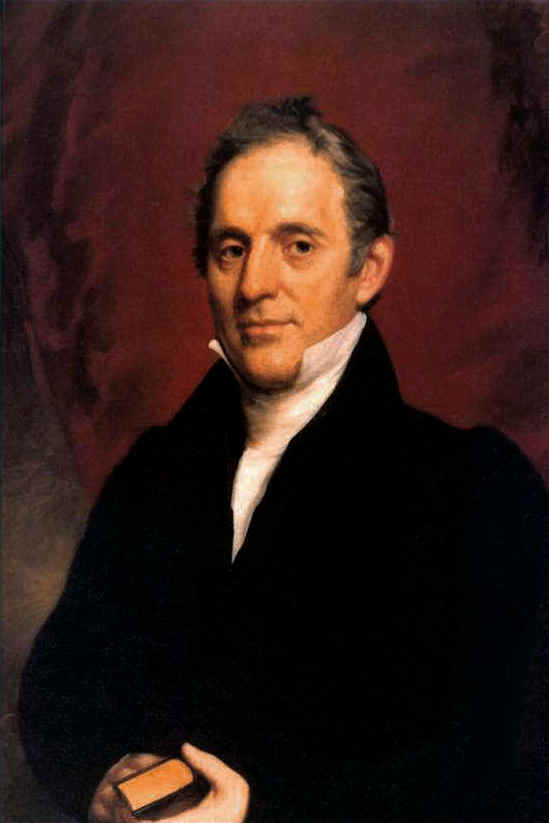
Asahel Nettleton

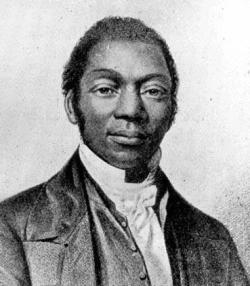
James W.C. Pennington

- Hiram Bingham II (1853), missionary to Hawaii and the Gilbert Islands
- Ralph Arthur Bohlmann (Ph.D. 1968), ninth president of the Lutheran Church–Missouri Synod
- Angela Warnick Buchdahl (born 1972), rabbi
- William Ragsdale Cannon (B.D. 1940 Ph.D. 1942), professor and dean of the Candler School of Theology at Emory University; United Methodist Church bishop
- Oliver Crane (B.A. 1845), Presbyterian clergy, missionary to Turkey, Oriental scholar, writer
- Thomas Frederick Davies Sr. (1853 & 1893), third bishop of the Episcopal Diocese of Michigan, 1889–1905
- Jonathan Edwards, New England pastor and theologian
- Leroy Gilbert, Chaplain of the United States Coast Guard
- John Guernsey (B.A., 1975), Anglican bishop
- Matthew Heyd, Episcopal priest
- Jeffrey R. Holland (Ph.D. 1973), former president of Brigham Young University, apostle of the Church of Jesus Christ of Latter-day Saints
- Ashley Day Leavitt (B.A. 1900), minister of Harvard Congregational Church, Brookline, Massachusetts
- John H. Leith (Ph.D. 1949), Presbyterian author, theologian and professor
- Aaron L. Mackler (B.A. 1980), notable rabbi in the Conservative movement
- John G. Magee (B.A. 1906), Episcopal missionary in China who helped organize the Nanking Safety Zone during the 1937 Nanjing Massacre and photographed crimes of the Imperial Japanese Army; Episcopal chaplain at Yale University 1946–1953
- James Massa (M.Th. 1985), Roman Catholic auxiliary bishop of the Diocese of Brooklyn
- Asahel Nettleton (1809), theologian and pastor from Connecticut who was highly influential during the Second Great Awakening
- James W.C. Pennington (1809–1870), African American orator, minister, and abolitionist; the first black man to attend classes at Yale when he audited classes at Yale Divinity School 1834–1839
- Harry Boone Porter, liturgist, journalist, clergyman of the Episcopal Church, editor of The Living Church magazine
- Yasir Qadhi (Ph.D. candidate), Muslim theologian
- Gordon P. Robertson (B.A. 1980), CEO of the Christian Broadcasting Network
- Anson Phelps Stokes, III (B.A. 1927), eleventh bishop of the Episcopal Diocese of Massachusetts
- Andrew Leete Stone (1836), minister, author
- Roy M. Terry, chief of chaplains of the United States Air Force
- Asa Thurston (1816), one of the first missionaries to introduce Christianity to the Kingdom of Hawai'i
- Baby Varghese (Ph.D. 2004), visiting professor of Liturgical Studies
- Stephen N. Williams (1981), Ph.D. student, Presbyterian theologian
- Thomas Smith Williamson (1824), missionary to the Dakota who helped translate the first Dakota-language Bible

== History, literature, and journalism ==
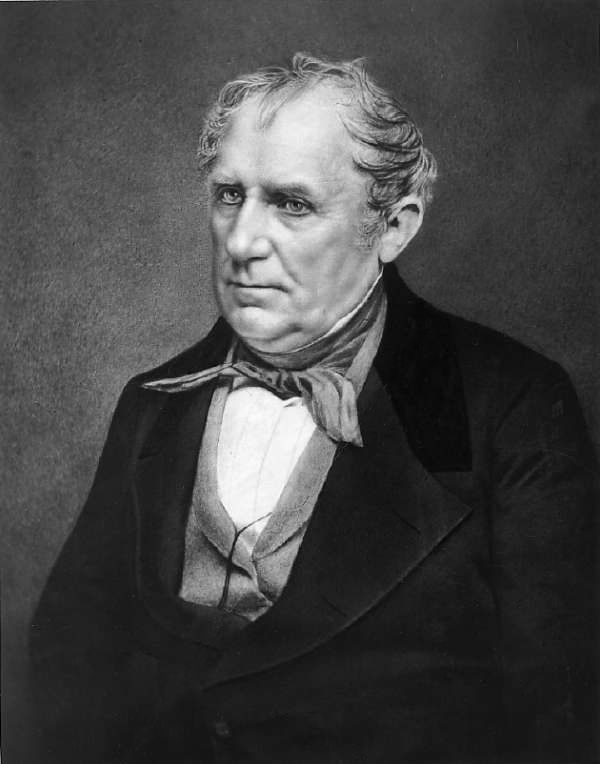
James Fenimore Cooper by Mathew Brady

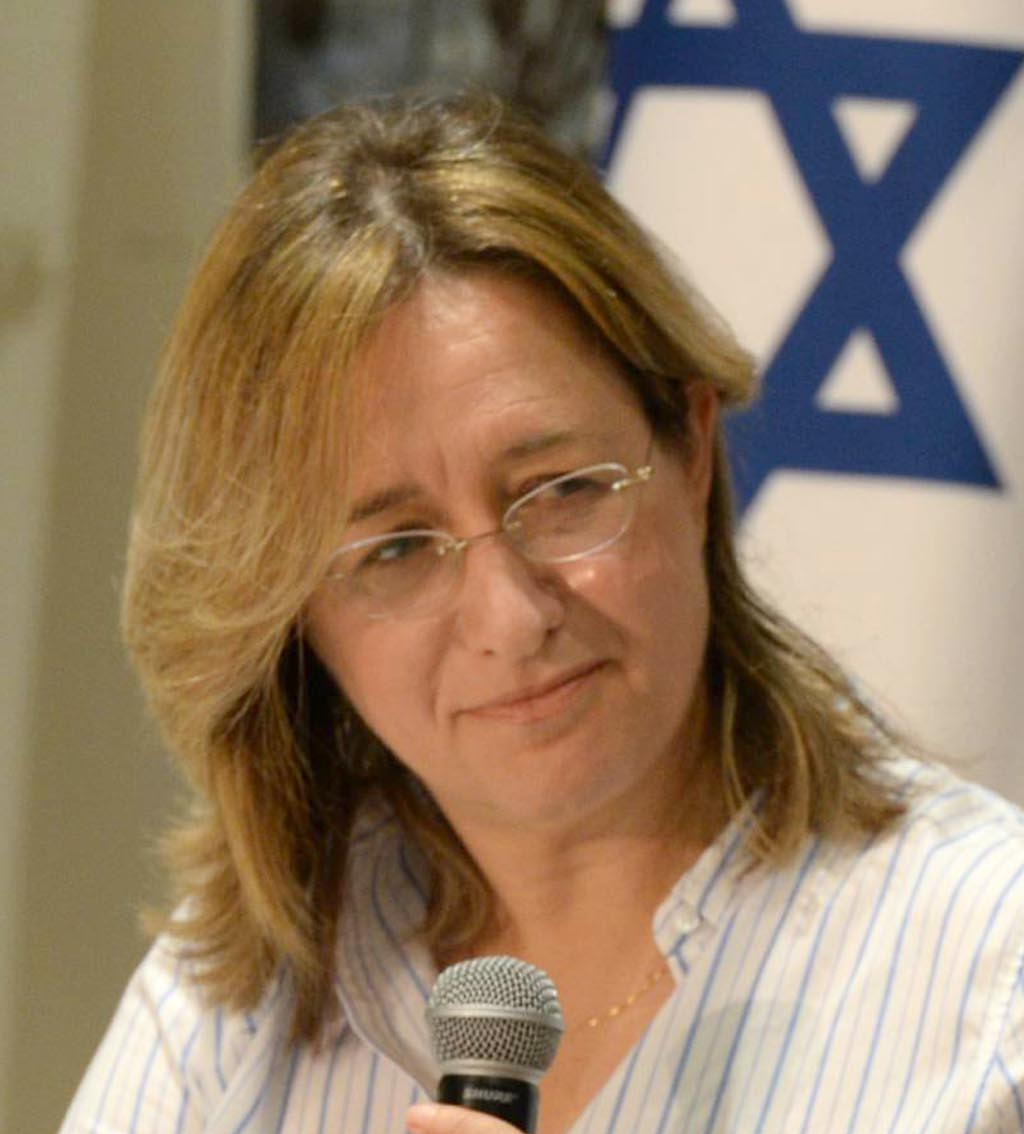
Ilana Dayan

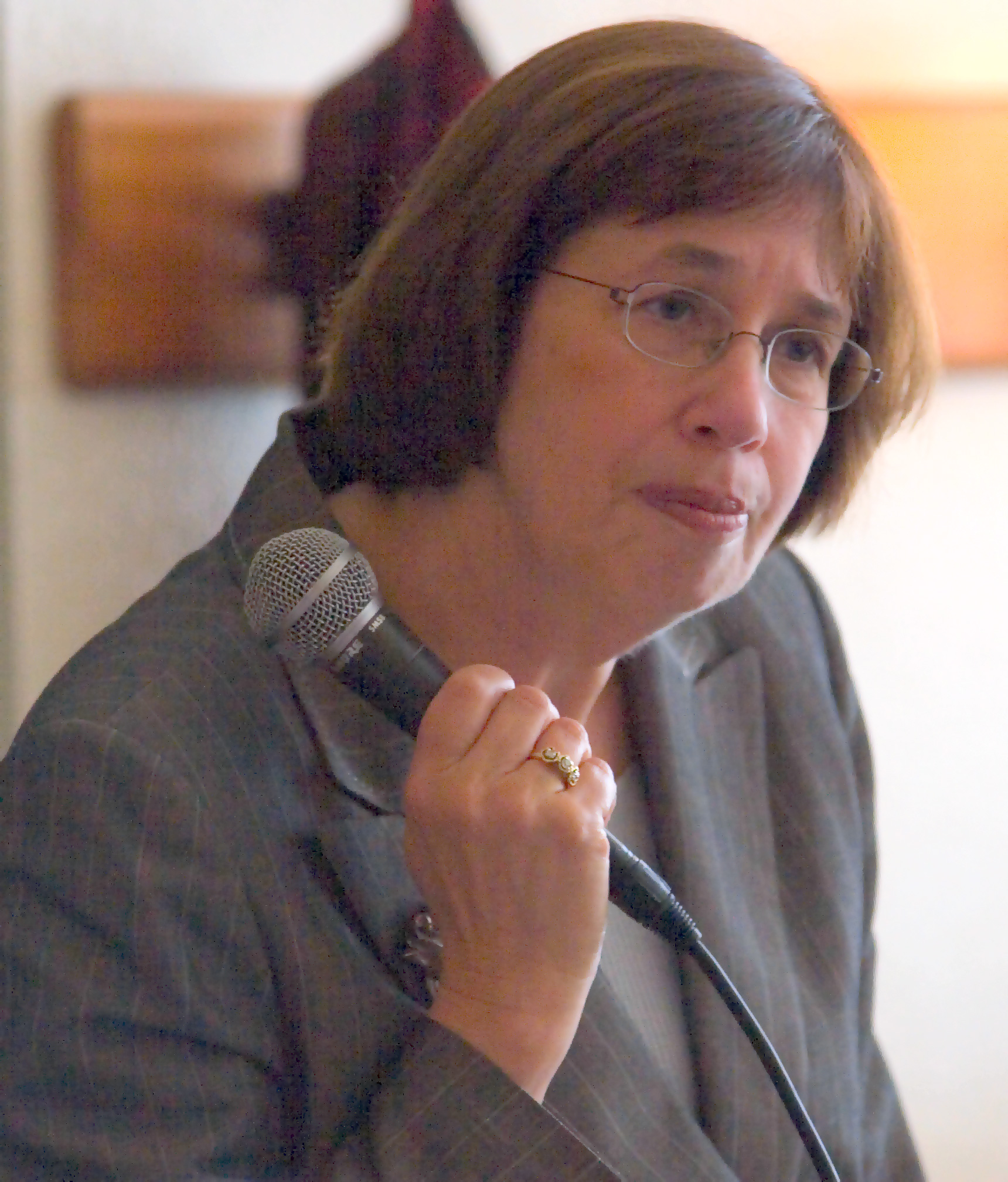
Linda Greenhouse

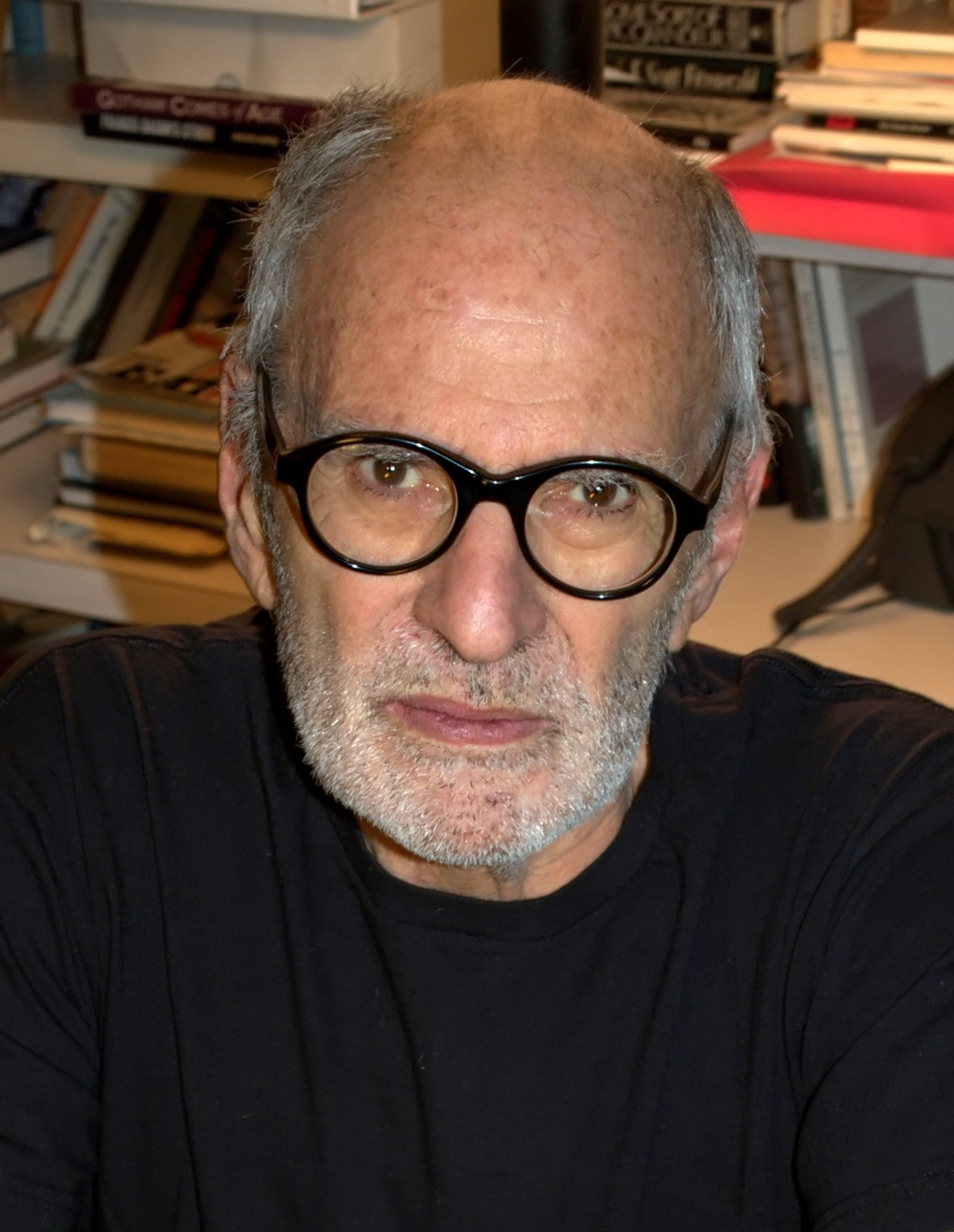
Larry Kramer

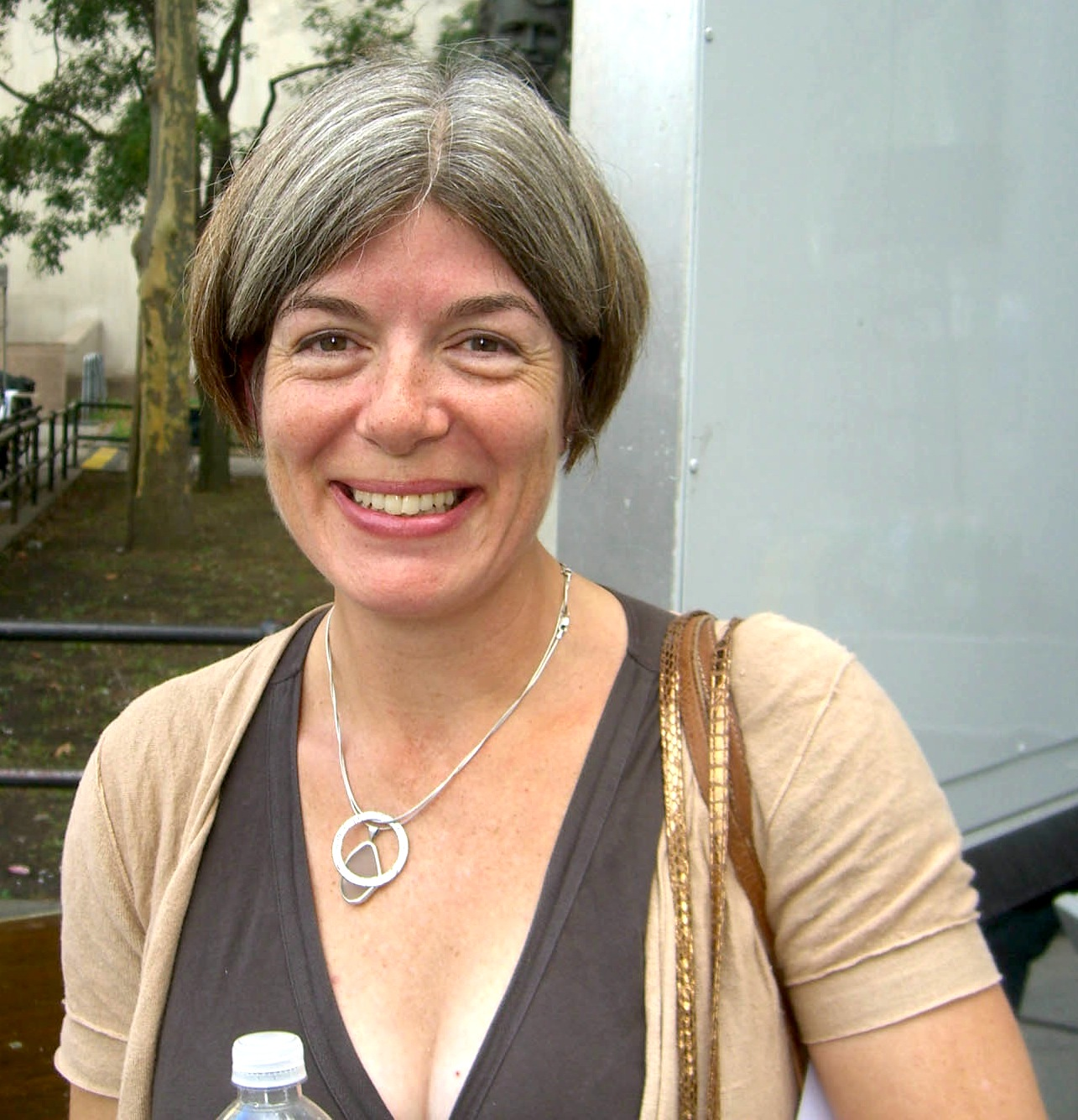
Claire Messud

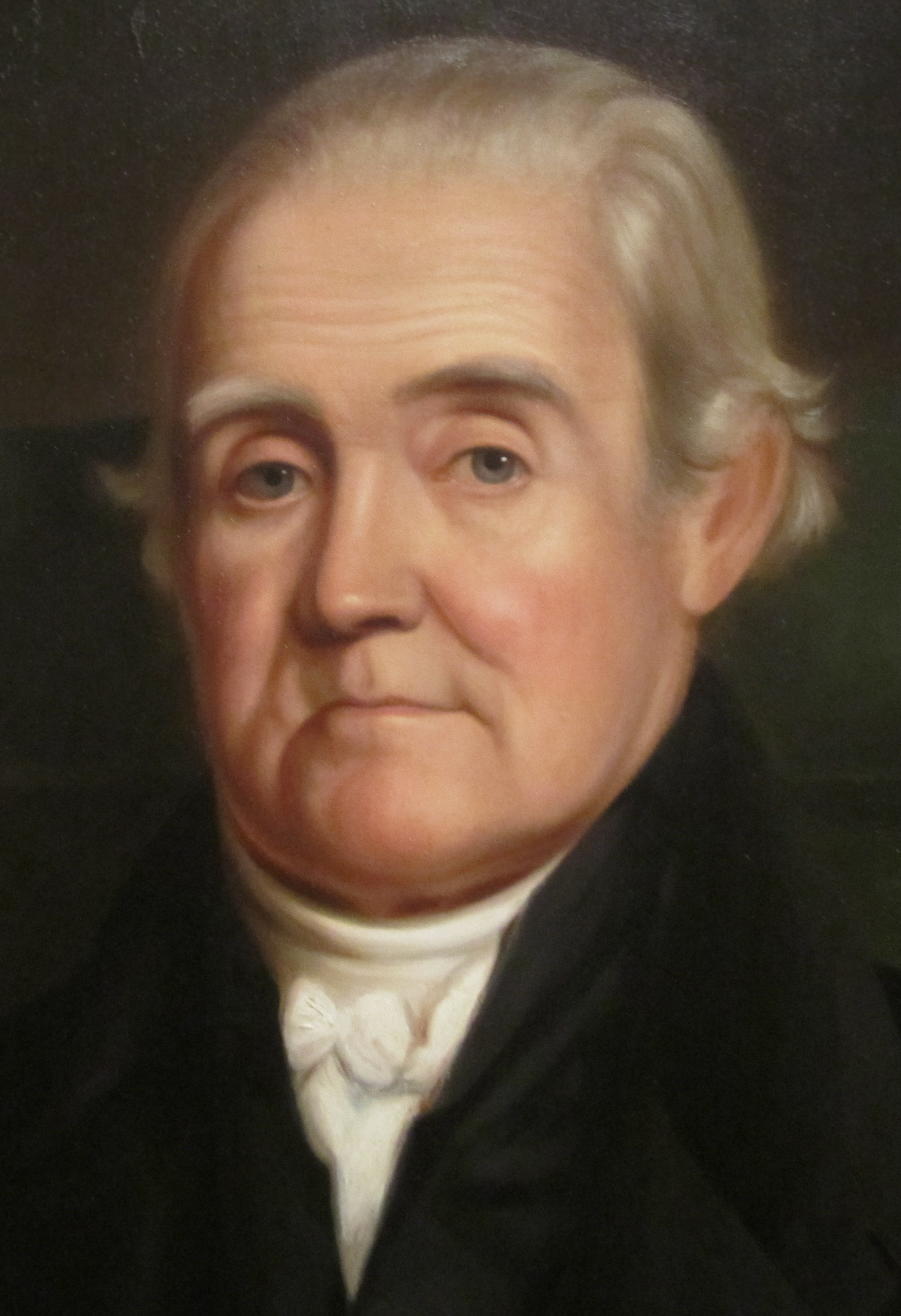
Noah Webster

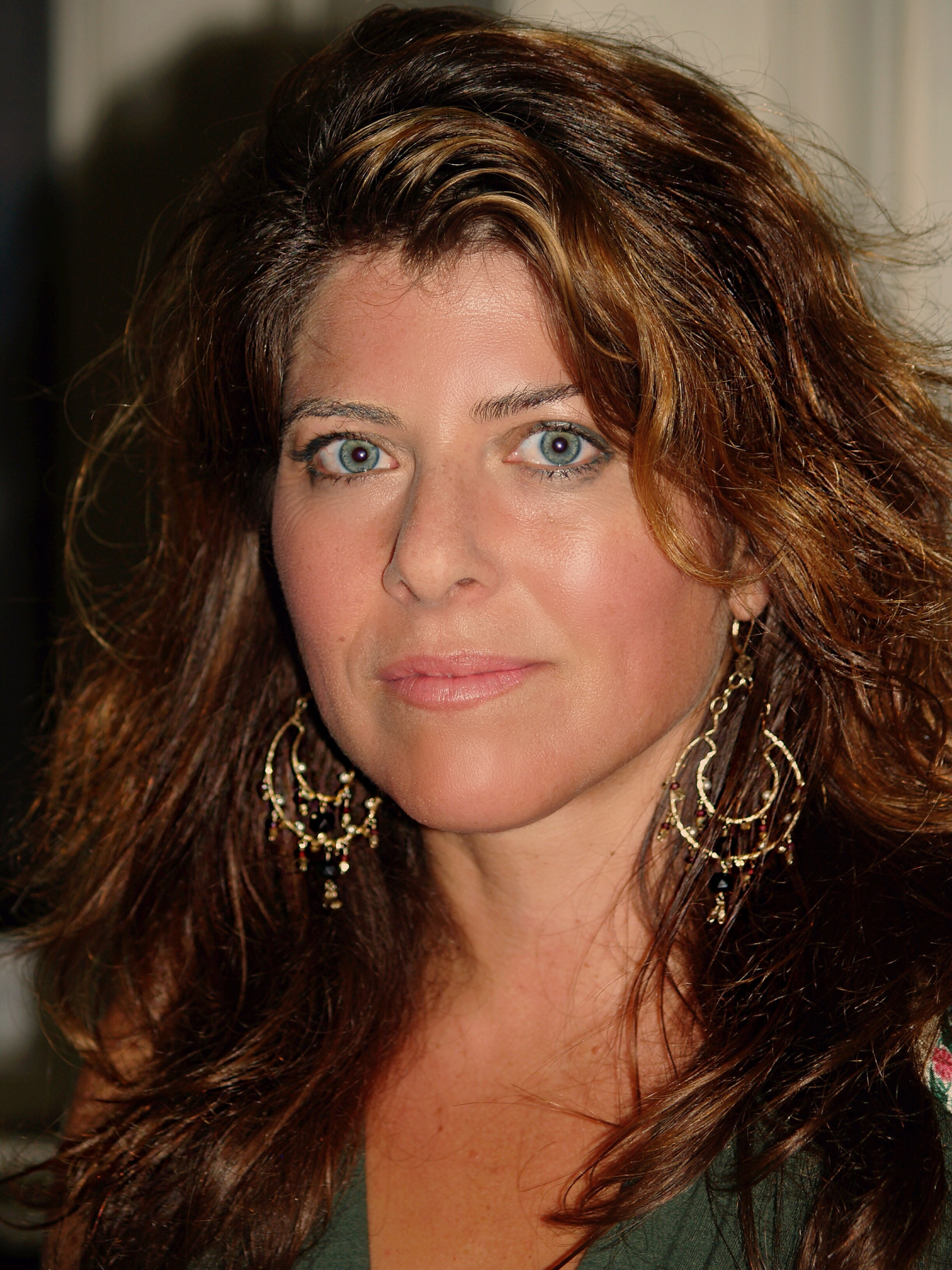
Naomi Wolf

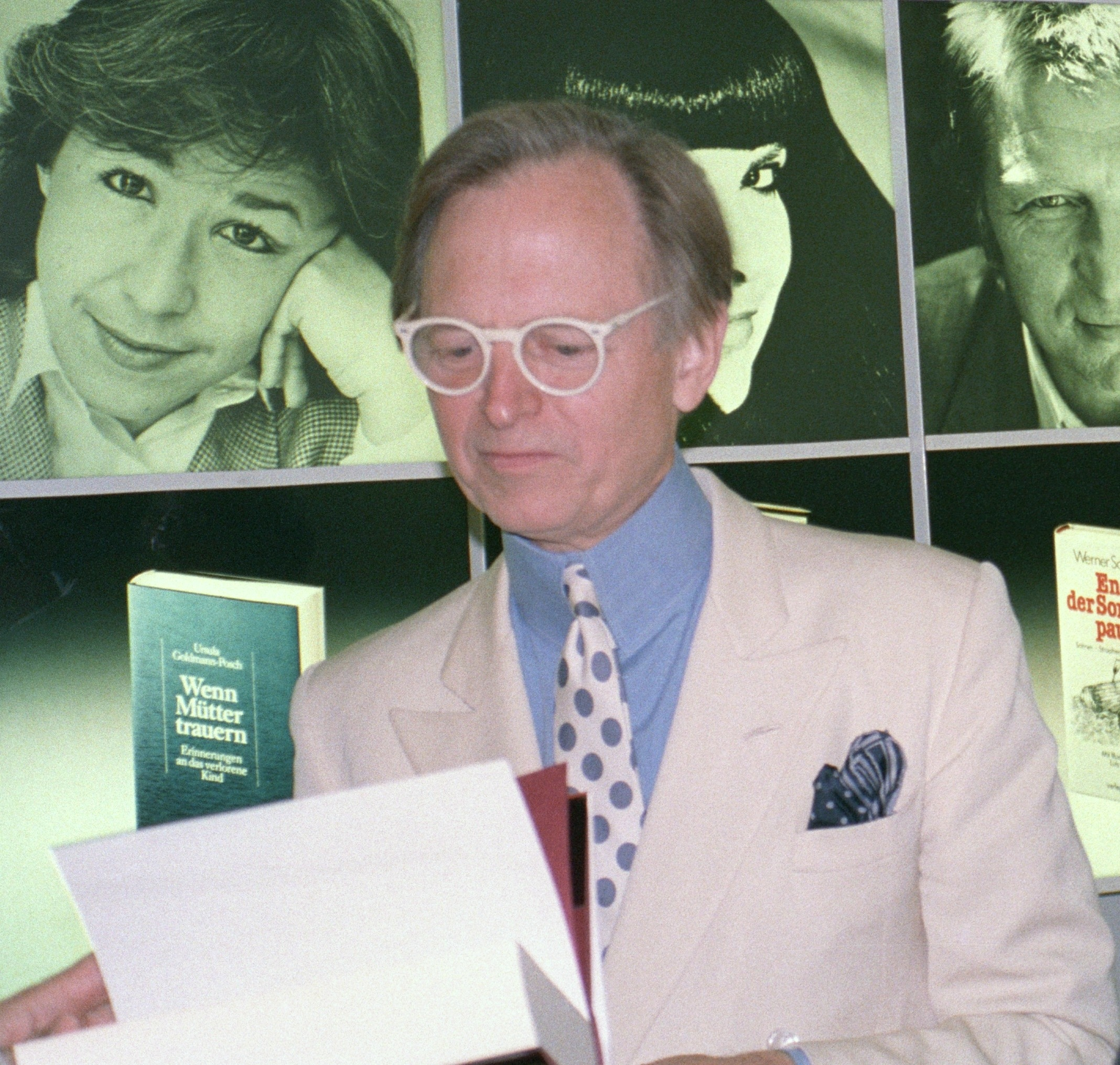
Tom Wolfe

- Michael Barbaro (B.A. 2002), host of the podcast The Daily
- Leigh Bardugo (B.A. 1997), novelist
- Ellen Berry (B.A. 1993), journalist, New York Times
- Emily Bazelon (B.A. 1993, J.D. 2000), journalist, New York Times
- Carl Bialik (Class of 2001), journalist, The Wall Street Journal
- Harold Bloom (Ph.D. 1956), literary critic
- Steven Brill (B.A. 1972, J.D. 1975), founder of Court TV and The American Lawyer
- Robert Brustein (DRA 1951), founder of the Yale Repertory Theatre, critic, author
- Thad Carhart, writer of The Piano Shop on the Left Bank and other books
- Lan Samantha Chang (B.A. 1987), writer and director of the Iowa Writers' Workshop
- Susan Choi (B.A. 1990), author of Trust Exercise
- David Churbuck (B.A. 1980), journalist, Forbes, founder of Forbes.com
- Marie Colvin (B.A. 1978), journalist
- James Fenimore Cooper (Class of 1805), author of The Last of the Mohicans
- Wilbur Cross, author
- Chris Cuomo (B.A.), television journalist and anchor for NewsNation
- Catherine Cusset, novelist
- Brian D'Amato (B.A. 1984), novelist and sculptor
- Ilana Dayan (Ph.D. 1992), Israeli journalist and anchorwoman
- Charles DeKay, linguist, poet, critic and fencer
- Randy Charles Epping (M.A. 1983), author
- Charles Finch (B.A. 2002), novelist and critic
- Justus Miles Forman (1898), author and playwright
- Brendan Gill (B.A. 1936), architectural critic
- David Gonzalez (B.A. 1979), journalist, The New York Times
- Dana Goodyear (B.A. 1998), journalist and poet
- Linda Greenhouse (M.S.L. Yale Law School, 1978), journalist, covers the United States Supreme Court for The New York Times
- Edwin S. Grosvenor (B.A. 1974), president and editor-in-chief, American Heritage magazine
- Gilbert M. Grosvenor (B.A. 1954), formerly editor, then president, now chairman emeritus at National Geographic
- Lloyd Grove, editor at large for The Daily Beast
- Roland Hagenbüchle, scholar for American Studies and philosopher
- Nia-Malika Henderson (M.A.), senior political reporter for CNN formally for The Washington Post
- William Harlan Hale (B.A. 1931), writer, journalist, editor
- Peter Hayes (M.A. 1974, M.Phil. 1976, Ph.D. 1982), Holocaust historian
- Quiara Alegría Hudes (B.A.), playwright, In the Heights, 2008 Tony for Best Musical
- Sumiko Iwao (Ph.D.), psychologist, editor-in-chief of Japan Echo
- Joan Kahn (attended Yale School of Art one year, early 1930s), mystery editor and anthologist; novelist and children's writer
- Michiko Kakutani (B.A. 1976), book critic for The New York Times
- Matthew Kaminski (B.A. 1994), editor-in-chief of POLITICO
- Mina Kimes (Summa cum laude, B.A. 2007), journalist for ESPN
- Michael Kimmelman (B.A. 1980), critic for The New York Times
- Karl Kirchwey (B.A. 1979), poet
- John Knowles (B.A. 1949), author of A Separate Peace
- Larry Kramer (B.A. 1957), playwright and gay activist
- John Lahr (B.A. 1963), drama critic for the New Yorker
- David Leavitt (B.A. 1983), author
- Min Jin Lee (B.A. 1990), author of Pachinko
- David Leonhardt (B.A. 1994), Washington bureau chief for The New York Times
- Elizabeth Letts (B.A. 1983), author of The Eighty Dollar Champion: Snowman, the Horse that Inspired a Nation
- Jeremy Leven, author, screenwriter, director and producer whose works include Don Juan DeMarco
- Jonathan Levi (B.A. 1977), author, producer, musician, co-founder of Granta
- Adam Liptak (B.A. 1984, J.D. 1988), Supreme Court correspondent for The New York Times
- Jonathan Littell (B.A. 1989), writer; won the Prix Goncourt
- William Logan (B.A. 1972), poet, critic
- Wednesday Martin (Ph.D. 1996), journalist, memoirist, anthropologist
- Peter Matthiessen (B.A. 1950), naturalist, author of historical fiction and nonfiction
- Jane Mayer (B.A. 1977), journalist and author
- J.D. McClatchy (Ph.D. 1974), poet, critic, member of American Academy of Arts and Letters
- Gordon McLendon (B.A. 1942), radio pioneer, Top 40 radio format, co-founder of the Association for Intelligence Officers
- Standish Meacham (1954), historian
- Walter Russell Mead (B.A. 1976), academic, writer on foreign affairs, and public intellectual
- Jane Mendelsohn (Summa cum laude, B.A. 1987), author of I Was Amelia Earhart
- Claire Messud (B.A. 1987), author of The Emperor's Children
- Ehrman Syme Nadal (B.A. 1864), writer and journalist
- Shannon K. O'Neil (B.A. 1993 and M.A. 1999), Douglas Dillon fellow in the Latin America studies department at the Council on Foreign Relations
- Julie Otsuka (B.A. 1984), author
- Ann Packer (B.A. 1981), author
- George Packer (B.A. 1982), author
- ZZ Packer (B.A. 1994), author
- Jon Pareles (B.A), popular music critic at The New York Times
- Tom Perrotta (B.A. 1983), author
- David Pogue (B.A. 1985), technology columnist for The New York Times
- Ogden Mills Reid (B.A. 1904, Law 1907), newspaper publisher, president of the New York Herald Tribune
- Whitelaw Reid (B.A. 1934), journalist; editor, president and chairman of the family-owned New York Herald Tribune
- Alexandra Robbins (B.A. 1998), author
- Jonathan Sarna (Ph.D. 1979), historian and author
- Sam Savage (B.A. 1968, Ph.D. 1979), author
- Ari Shapiro (B.A. 2000), White House correspondent for National Public Radio
- Anna Shechtman (Ph.D. 2020), journalist and crossword compiler
- Francis W. Shepardson (Ph.D. 1892), academic, director of the Illinois Department of Registration and Education
- Amity Shlaes (B.A. 1982), journalist, New York Times bestselling author
- Ben Smith (B.A. 1999), New York Times media columnist
- Elihu Hubbard Smith (B.A. 1786), poet, playwright, physician, and man of letters
- Andrew Solomon (B.A. 1985), writer
- Stephen J. Stein (Ph.D. 1970), historian
- Mark Strand (B.F.A 1959), former Poet Laureate of the United States
- Diane Straus (B.A. 1973) (1951–2017), publisher of The American Prospect and Washington Monthly
- R. Peter Straus (B.A. 1944) (1923–2012), owner of radio stations and newspapers
- Anjan Sundaram (B.S., M.S. 2005), writer, journalist and TV presenter
- Calvin Trillin, writer, poet, and journalist
- Ishaan Tharoor (B.A. 2006), journalist
- Erica Simone Turnipseed (B.A. 1993), writer
- Noah Webster (B.A. 1778, LL.D. 1823), lexicographer, author of the first definitive dictionary of the American English language, helped found Amherst College
- Jacob Weisberg (B.A. 1986), political journalist and former editor-in-chief of The Slate Group
- Juliette Wells (M.A. 2000, MPhil 2000, Ph.D. 2003), author, editor, and Jane Austen scholar
- Dick Wimmer (M.A. 1959), novelist
- Lauren Willig (B.A. 1999), novelist
- Naomi Wolf (B.A. 1984), feminist writer
- Tom Wolfe (Ph.D. 1957), journalist, author of The Right Stuff and The Bonfire of the Vanities
- Janet Wu (B.A. 1988), broadcast journalist and writer
- Ben Yagoda (B.A. 1975), journalist, author of a history of the New Yorker
- Jonas Zdanys (B.A. 1972), poet and translator
- Anna Ziegler (B.A. 2001), playwright

== Musicians and composers ==
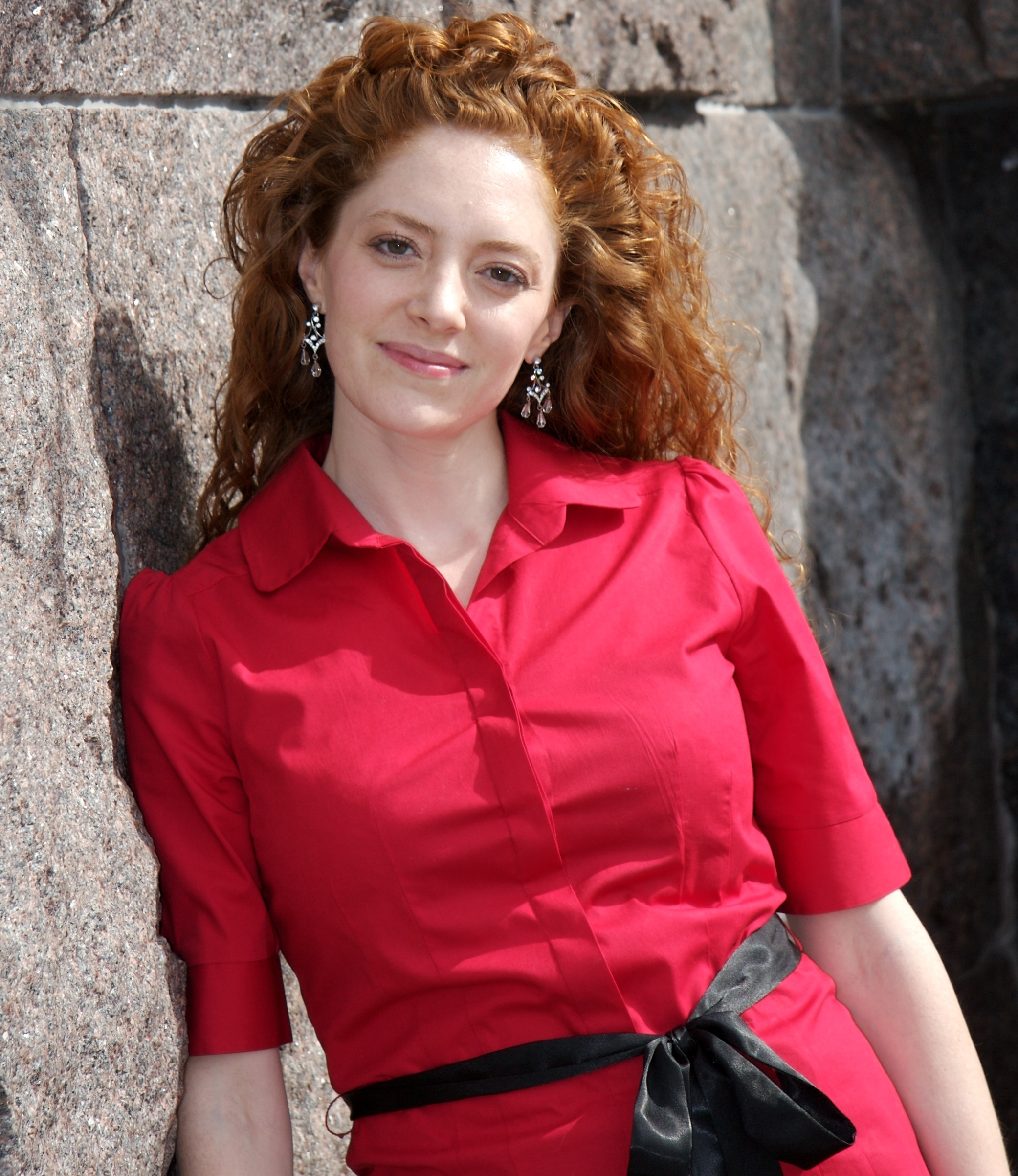
Lisa Hopkins

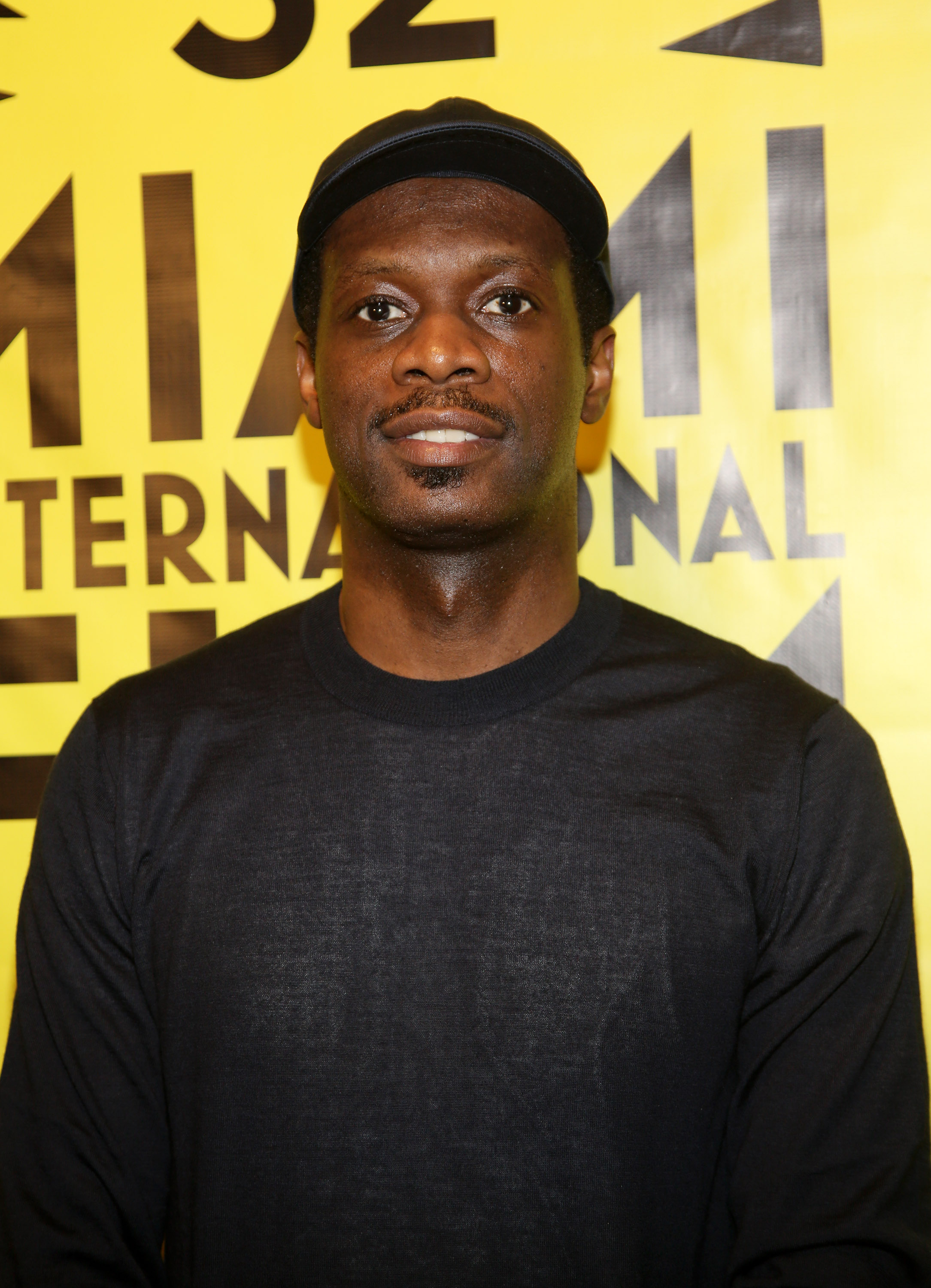
Pras

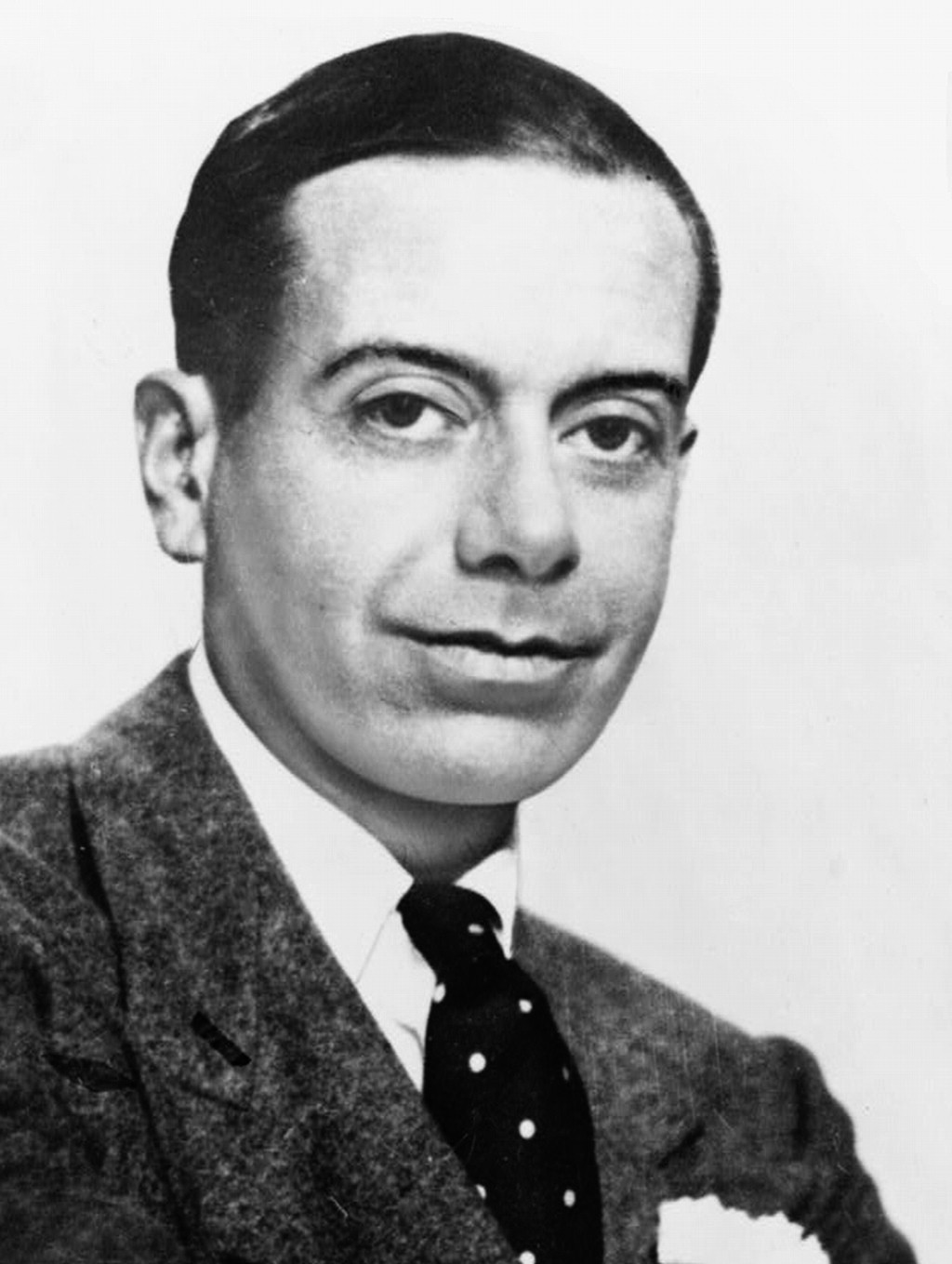
Cole Porter

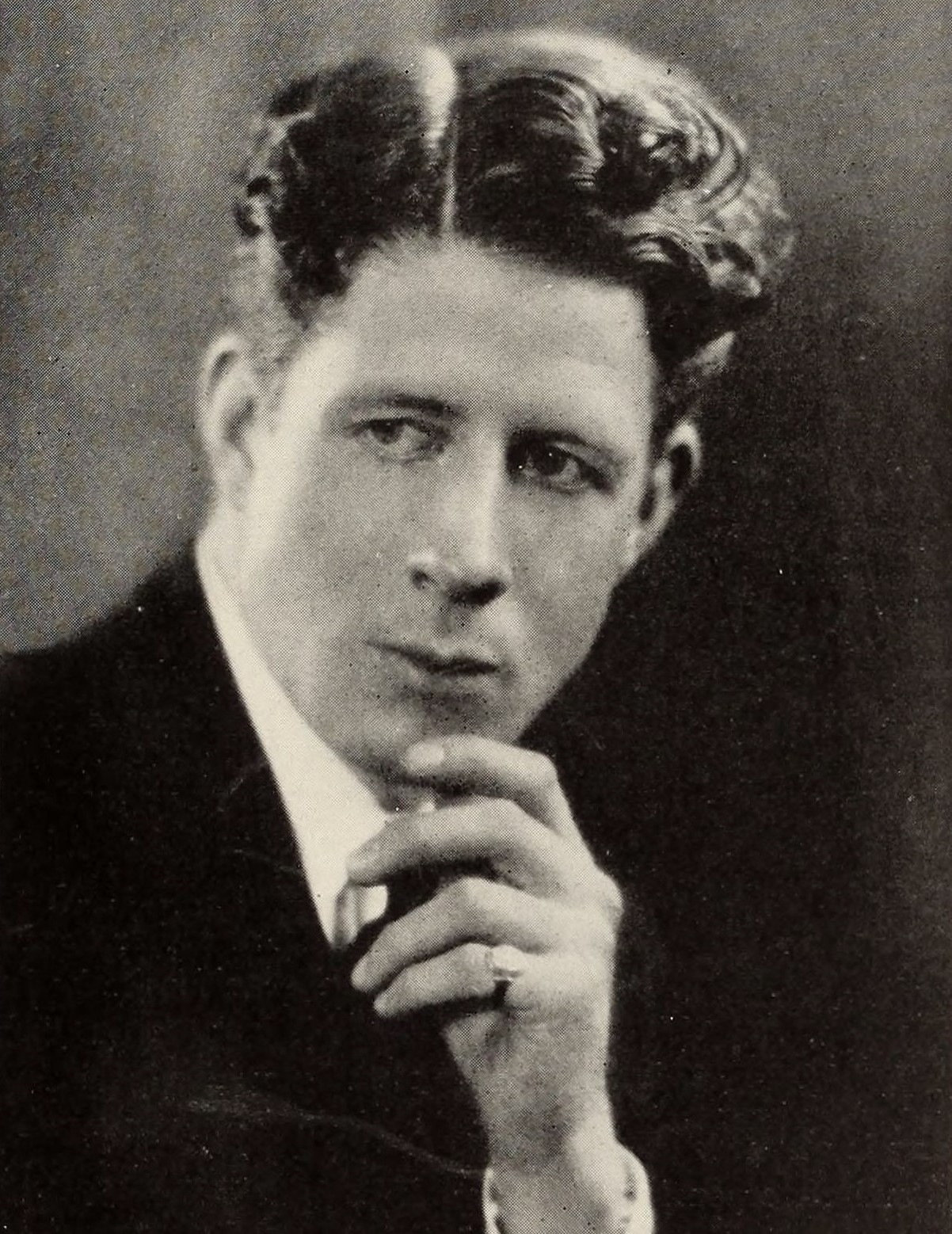
Rudy Vallée

- Marin Alsop (1973–75, transferred to Juilliard), conductor and music director of the Baltimore Symphony Orchestra
- June Anderson (B.A. 1974), soprano
- Timo Andres (B.A.), pianist and composer
- Eric Banks (B.A. 1990), composer
- Jane Ira Bloom (B.A. 1976, Yale Music School 1977), soprano saxophonist
- Robert Bloom, professor of Oboe, Yale School of Music (1957–76)
- Carter Brey, principal cellist for the New York Philharmonic
- Robert Carl, composer and chair of the Composition Department at the Hartt School
- Rachel Cheung (M.Mus. 2013), Hong Kong pianist
- Jonathan Coulton (B.A. 1992), musician, internet celebrity
- Bryce Dessner (B.A. 1998, M.M. 1999), member of The National and collaborator with Taylor Swift, among other artists
- Dominick DiOrio (M.M. 2008, D.M.A. 2012), conductor, composer, professor of choral conducting at the Jacobs School of Music, director of NOTUS
- Eliot Fisk (1972–76), classical guitar virtuoso
- Jack Glatzer (B.A. 1960), concert violinist
- Michael Gore (B.A. 1973), Academy Award-winning composer
- Adam Guettel (B.A. 1987), Tony Award-winning composer/lyricist
- Walter Hekster (M.Mus. 1963), composer, clarinetist and conductor
- Mark Helias (M.Mus. 1976), bassist and composer
- Lisa Hopkins (B.A. 2001), opera singer and Tony Award winner
- Charles Ives (B.A. 1898), composer, classical music
- Vijay Iyer (B.S. 1991), 2013 MacArthur Fellow, jazz pianist and composer
- Ranidu Lankage (B.A. 2005), Sinhalese R&B and hip-hop artist
- Fan Lei (M.Mus. 1992), clarinetist, pedagogue, adjudicator, founder and artistic director of numerous international music festivals and competitions
- Mitch Leigh (B.A 1951, M.Mus. 1952), composer, producer Man of La Mancha, "To Dream the Impossible Dream"
- Gilbert Levine (M.A. 1972), conductor
- George E. Lewis (B.A. 1974), trombonist and composer
- David Longstreth, songwriter, singer, guitarist for the Dirty Projectors
- Robert Lopez (B.A. 1997), co-creator of the Broadway musicals Avenue Q and The Book of Mormon and winner of three Tony Awards
- Alvin Lucier (B.A. 1954), experimental composer
- John Mauceri (B.A. 1967), conductor and scholar
- Susan Merdinger (B.A. 1983), concert pianist, music educator
- Douglas Moore (B.A. 1915, B.M 1917), composer
- Nerissa Nields (B.A. 1989), of the band The Nields
- Kevin Olusola (B.A. 2011), beatboxer, cellist, singer, songwriter, Grammy-winning member of Pentatonix
- Johann Sebastian Paetsch (M.M. 1987), musician and cellist
- Cole Porter (B.A. 1913), composer
- Pras (Michél), Grammy Award-winning rapper, member of hip-hop trio The Fugees
- Ravi Rajan (M.Mus. 2000), musician, artist, college president
- André Raphel, conductor of the Wheeling Symphony Orchestra
- Root Boy Slim, real name Foster MacKenzie III (B.A. 1967), lyricist and blues musician
- Kurt Hugo Schneider (B.A. 2010), YouTube sensation, music producer, and filmmaker
- Caroline Shaw (M.Mus. 2007), composer, violinist, and singer
- Chad Shelton (M.A. 1997), operatic tenor
- Sam Tsui (B.A. 2011), YouTube sensation, singer
- Rudy Vallée (B.A. 1927), singer, actor, bandleader, and entertainer
- Maury Yeston (B.A. 1967, Ph.D. 1974), composer, lyricist, musicologist, Tony Awards for Nine and Titanic
- Terence Yung (Course Certificate 2022), concert pianist

== Faculty ==
Professors who are also Yale alumni are listed in italics.

== Nobel laureates ==
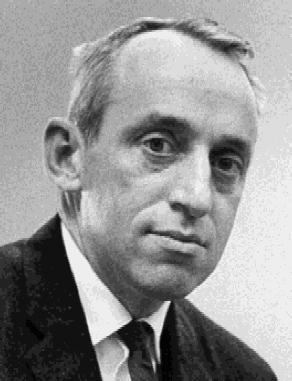
James Tobin

- Sidney Altman: Chemistry, 1989
- Gérard Debreu: Economics, 1983
- John Fenn: Chemistry, 2002; received his PhD from Yale in 1940; member of the Yale faculty 1962–94
- Tjalling Koopmans: Economics, 1975
- Wangari Maathai: Peace, 2004; visiting professor at the Forestry School in 2002
- Erwin Neher: Physiology or Medicine, 1991; biophysicist at the Max Planck Institute for Biophysical Chemistry who was previously a postdoctoral fellow at Yale
- George Palade, professor at Yale Medical School 1973–90: Physiology or Medicine, 1974
- James Rothman: Physiology or Medicine, 2013
- Robert Shiller: Economics, 2013
- Thomas A. Steitz: Chemistry, 2009
- Edward Tatum: Physiology or Medicine, 1958; at Yale 1945–48
- James Tobin: Economics, 1981

== Social sciences ==
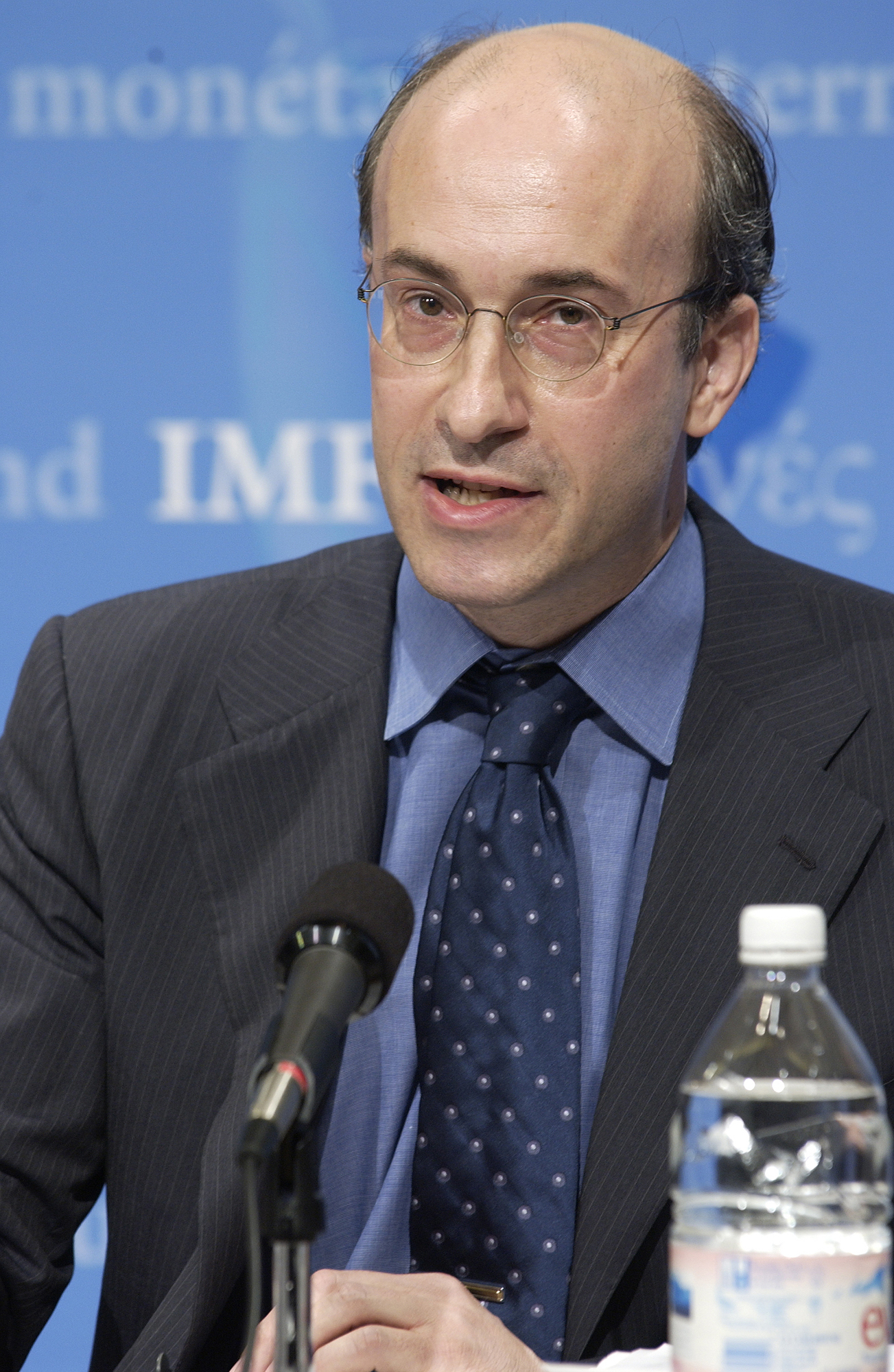
Kenneth Rogoff

- Rabab Abdulhadi (Ph.D. 2000), Palestinian-born American scholar, activist, educator, editor, and academic director
- Saleem Ali (M.E.S. 1996), Blue and Gold Distinguished Professor of Energy and Environment at the University of Delaware, National Geographic Emerging Explorer, World Economic Forum Young Global Leader
- Schuyler V. Cammann (B.A. 1935), anthropologist professor at University of Pennsylvania
- W. Edwards Deming (Ph.D. 1928), "total quality management" (TQM) guru
- Joel S. Fetzer (Ph.D. 1996), political scientist, distinguished professor at Pepperdine University
- Irving Fisher (B.A. 1888, Ph.D. 1891), economist, "father of monetarism"
- Edgar S. Furniss (Ph.D. 1918), economist and Provost of Yale University
- Edgar S. Furniss Jr. (B.A. 1940, M.A. 1945, Ph.D. 1947), political scientist
- Mahbub ul Haq (PhD, Economics), Pakistani minister of finance, professor at University of Karachi, creator of Human Development Index
- Douglas Hodgkin (B.A.), political scientist at Bates College, author
- Robert C. Lieberman (B.A. 1986), political scientist and provost of the Johns Hopkins University
- Andrew Lo (B.A. 1980), Charles E. and Susan T. Harris Professor of Finance at the MIT Sloan School of Management, director of MIT's Laboratory for Financial Engineering
- George Marcus (B.A. 1968), anthropologist, professor at University of California, Irvine
- Saul K. Padover (M.A., 1930), historian and political scientist at The New School of Social Research in New York City
- Kenneth Rogoff, economist, professor at Harvard University, former director of research at the International Monetary Fund
- Chris William Sanchirico (J.D., Ph.D. 1994), professor of law, business and public policy at University of Pennsylvania Law School
- David Swensen (Ph.D.), Yale Endowment Manager and professor at the Yale School of Management
- Karl Taube (M.A. 1983, Ph.D. 1988 Anthropology), pre-Columbian Mesoamerica researcher and Mayanist, professor of Anthropology at UC Riverside
- David A. Thomas (B.A. 1978, Ph.D. 1986), dean of the McDonough School of Business at Georgetown University, former professor at Harvard Business School
- Helen B. Thompson (Ph.D. 1917 Physiological Chemistry), home economist, professor emeritus at University of California, Los Angeles

== Technologists ==
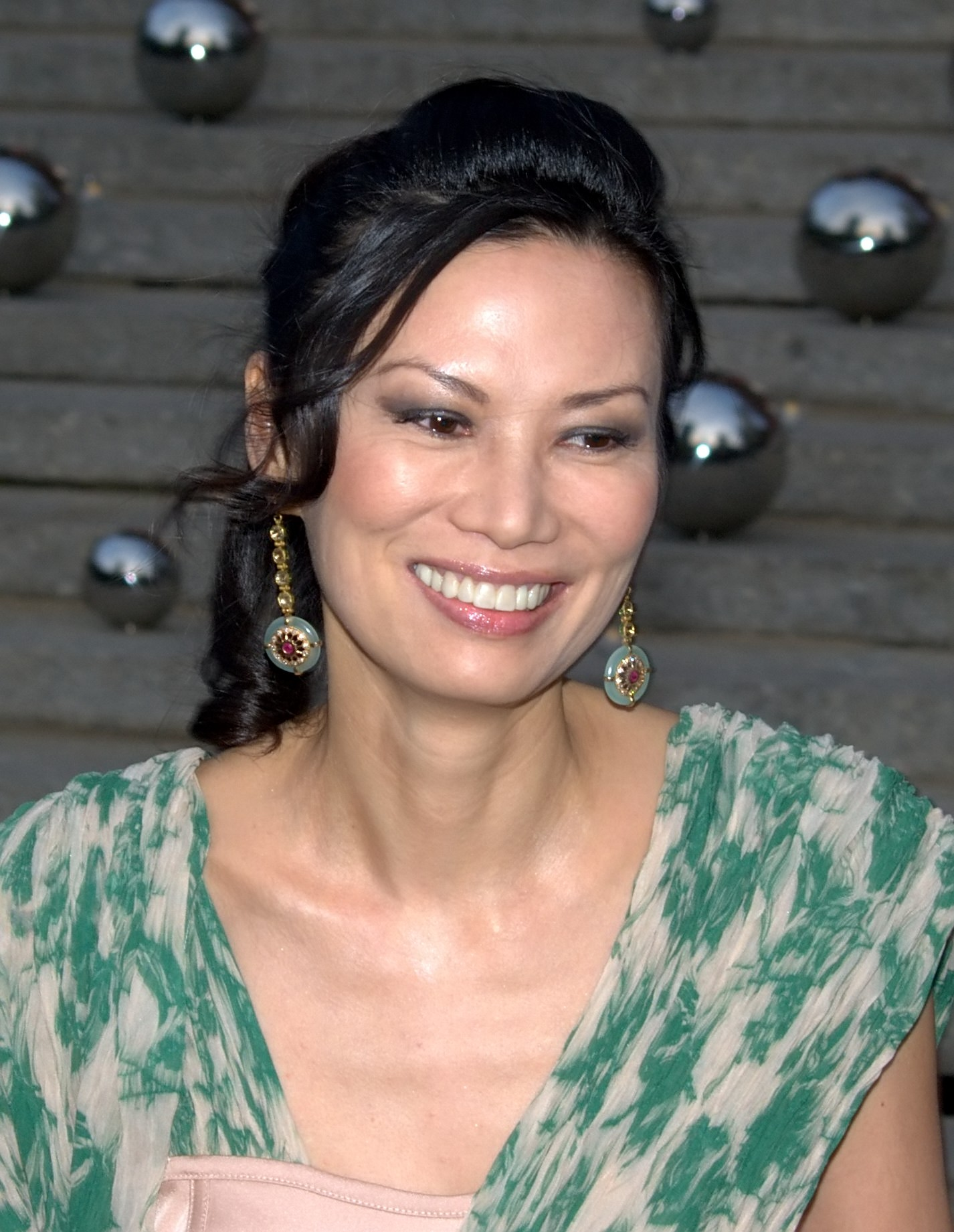
Wendi Deng Murdoch

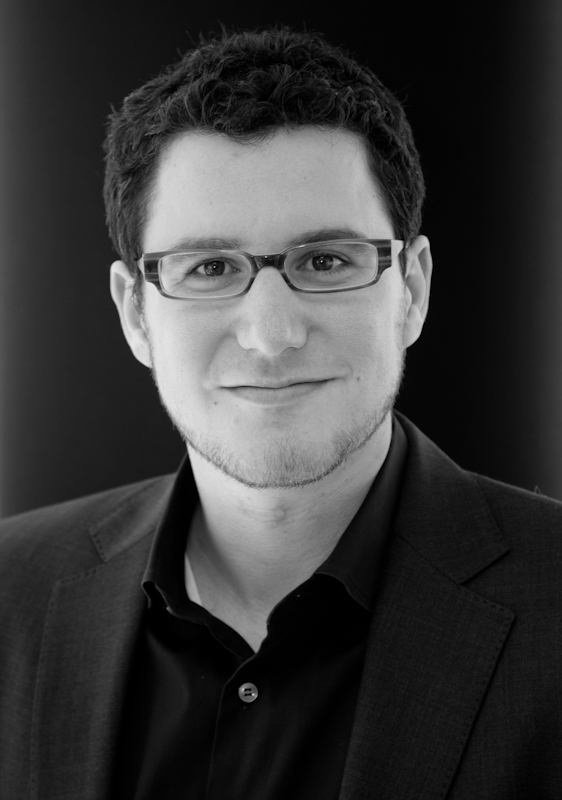
Eric Ries

- John J. Donovan (M.S. 1964, M.Ph. 1965, M.Eng. 1965, Ph.D. 1967), IT entrepreneur, founder of Cambridge Technology Partners
- Donna Dubinsky (B.A. 1977), former CEO of PDA company Palm Inc., co-founder of PDA company Handspring
- Rob Glaser (B.A., M.A.), founder and CEO, RealNetworks
- Bing Gordon (B.A. 1972), co-founder, executive vice-president, and chief creative officer of Electronic Arts
- Justin Kan (B.A. 2005), founder of Justin.tv and Twitch
- Mitch Kapor (B.A. 1971), founder, Open Source Applications Foundation, investor (Kapor Enterprises), founder and former CEO, Lotus Development
- Tom Lehman, co-founder of Genius website
- Jordan Mechner (B.A. 1985), video game developer, created Prince of Persia
- Wendi Deng Murdoch (1997), director, MySpace China; former VP, News Corporation; wife of Rupert Murdoch
- Tiffany Pham (B.A. 2008), founder and CEO of Mogul
- Eric Ries (B.S. 2001), Silicon Valley entrepreneur, author of The Lean Startup, pioneer of the Lean Startup methodology
- Kevin P. Ryan, internet entrepreneur, founder of Gilt Groupe, MongoDB, and Business Insider
- Emmett Shear (B.S. 2005), CEO of Twitch and interim CEO of OpenAI
- Ben Silbermann (B.A. 2003), co-founder and CEO of Pinterest
- Joel Spolsky (B.S. 1991), co-founder of Fog Creek Software, Stack Overflow and Stack Exchange Network
- Joseph Tsai (B.A. 1986, J.D., 1990), businessman, co-founder, Vice President and CFO of Alibaba
- C. C. Wei (PhD 1985), CEO of Taiwan Semiconductor Manufacturing Company Limited
- Anne Wojcicki (B.S., 1996), co-founder and CEO of personal genomics company 23andMe
- Tim and Nina Zagat, founders of Zagat

== Television ==
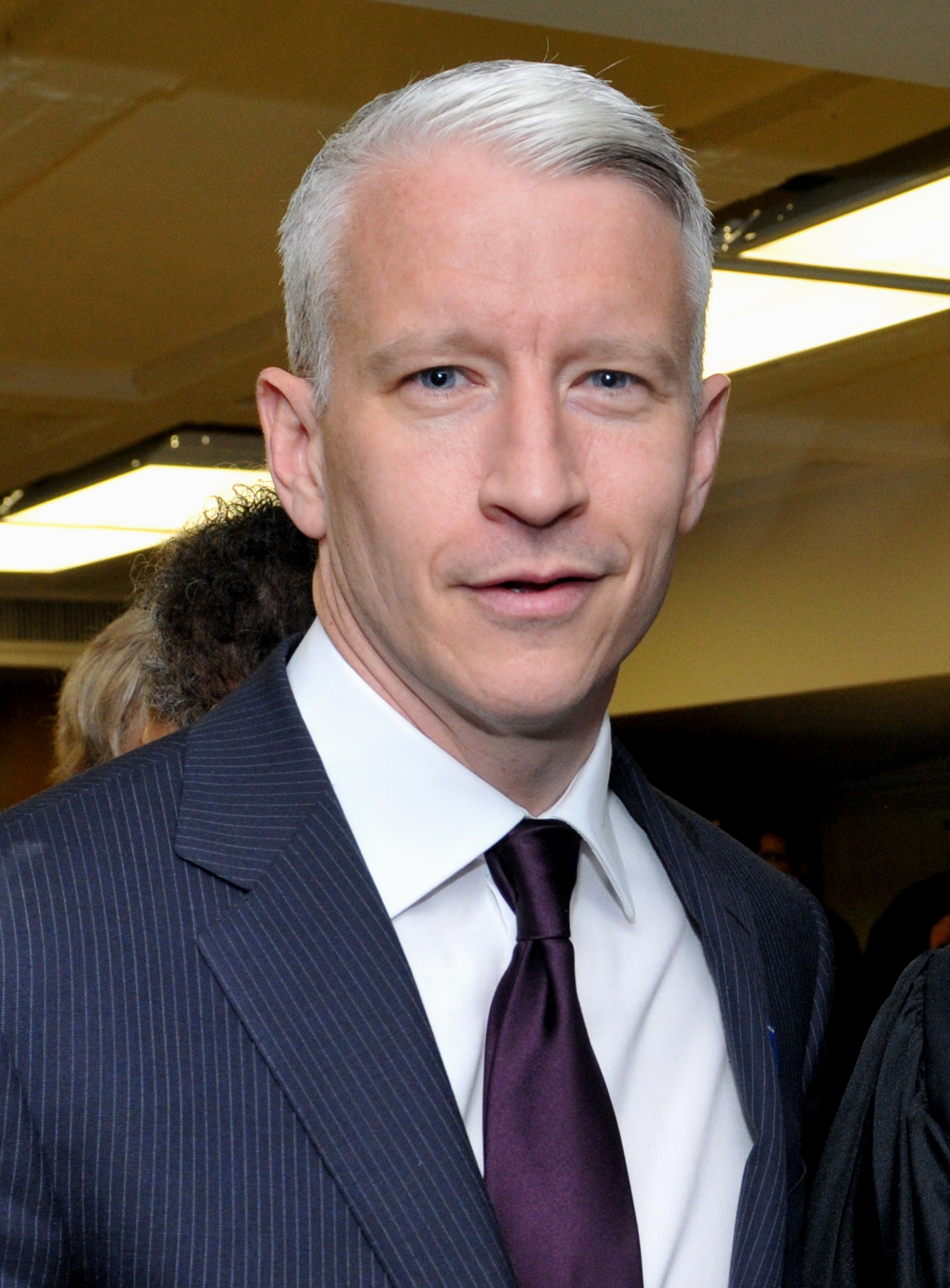
Anderson Cooper

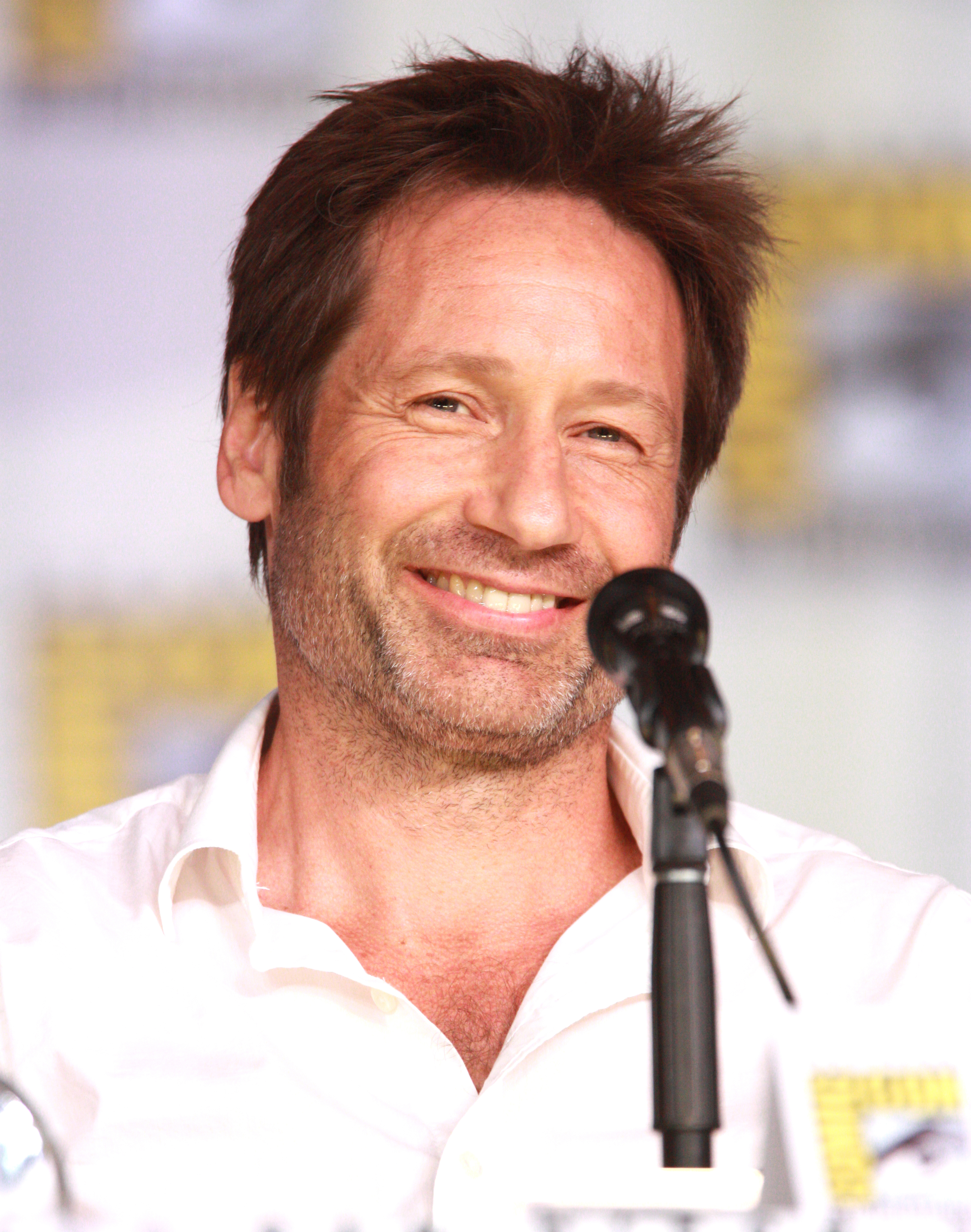
David Duchovny

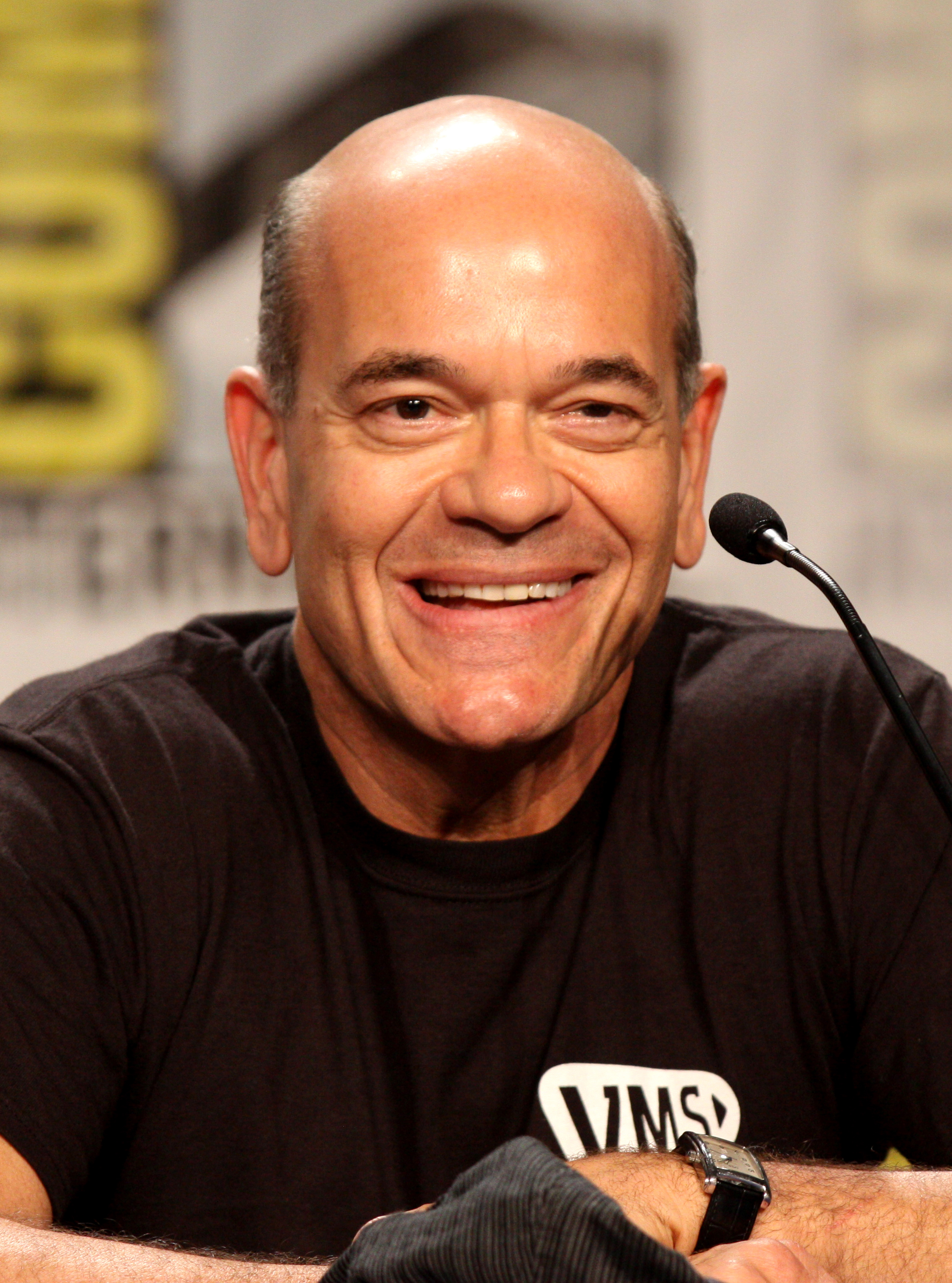
Robert Picardo

- Lewis Black (M.F.A. 1977), stand-up comedian who often appears on The Daily Show
- James Bohanek (B.A. 1991), Broadway and television actor
- James Burrows (M.A.), producer, Cheers, Will & Grace
- Dick Cavett, TV personality, nominated eleven times for the Emmy Award, and won three times
- Enrico Colantoni (M.F.A.), actor, Just Shoot Me, Galaxy Quest, and Veronica Mars
- Anderson Cooper (B.A. 1989), CNN anchor of Anderson Cooper 360°
- Bill Corbett (DRA 1989), actor, writer, played Crow T. Robot in Mystery Science Theater 3000
- Suzanne Cryer (B.A., M.F.A.), actress, Silicon Valley, Two Guys and a Girl
- Brett Dalton (M.F.A. 2011), actor in Agents of S.H.I.E.L.D.
- Claire Danes (did not graduate), actress in Homeland
- David Duchovny (M.A. English literature 1989), actor in The X-Files, Californication
- Dick Ebersol, president of NBC sports division, helped launch Saturday Night Live
- Kathryn Finney (MPH 2000), television correspondent, Today Show
- Malcolm Gets (M.F.A.), actor, best known for as "Richard Karinsky" on Caroline in the City
- Sara Gilbert (B.A. 1997), actress, best known for her portrayal as the daughter "Darlene Conner" on the sitcom Roseanne
- Felipe Gozon, Philippine television executive, GMA Network
- Michael Gross (DRA 1973), actor, best known as "Steven Keaton" (the father of Michael J. Fox's character) on Family Ties
- Harry Hamlin (B.A. 1974), actor best known as attorney "Michael Kuzak" in NBC TV drama L.A. Law
- John Hodgman (B.A. 1992), author and comedian who often appeared on The Daily Show and in Get a Mac ad campaigns, representing a humanized PC
- Elise Jordan (B.A. 2004), co-host of MSNBC's The Weekend Primetime
- Alex Jacob (B.A. 2006), winner of Jeopardy! 2015 Tournament of Champions
- Conor Knighton (B.A. 2003 Film Studies), host of InfoMania on Current TV
- Leo Laporte, host of The Screen Savers on TechTV
- Demetri Martin (B.A. 1995), stand-up comedian who often appears on The Daily Show
- Kellie Martin (B.A 2001)
- Anne Meacham (B.A. 1947), Broadway and television actress (Another World)
- Ari Meyers (B.A. 1991), actress, played Emma McArdle on Kate & Allie
- Robert Myhrum (M.F.A.), Emmy-nominated television director
- Chris Noth (CDR 1985), actor Law & Order: Criminal Intent, Sex and the City
- Maulik Pancholy (M.F.A. 1998), actor, 30 Rock, Phineas and Ferb, Whitney
- Walter F. Parkes (B.A. 1973), producer/writer, former head of DreamWorks
- Stone Phillips (B.A. 1977), television anchor for NBC
- Robert Picardo (B.A. 1975), the holographic doctor on the television show Star Trek: Voyager
- David Hyde Pierce (B.A. 1981), actor, best known as "Dr. Niles Crane" on Frasier; winner of four Emmy Awards
- Alan Poul (B.A. 1976), television director and producer
- Josh Saviano (B.A. 1998), played Paul Pfeiffer on The Wonder Years
- Matt Shakman (B.A. circa 1997), director, It's Always Sunny in Philadelphia
- Tony Shalhoub (M.F.A. 1980), actor, Monk, The Marvelous Mrs. Maisel
- Gene Siskel (M.F.A. 1974), film critic, At the Movies
- Steve Skrovan (B.A. 1979), executive producer of Everybody Loves Raymond and An Unreasonable Man
- Ben Stein (LL.D. 1970), economist, speechwriter to Nixon, host of Win Ben Stein's Money
- Jeremy Strong (B.A. 2000), actor on Succession
- Ming Tsai (B.A. 1986), chef on East Meets West with Ming Tsai on PBS
- Courtney B. Vance (M.F.A. 1986), actor, Law & Order: Criminal Intent
- Margaret Warner, co-anchor on The NewsHour with Jim Lehrer, PBS' weekday news program
- Sam Waterston (B.A. 1962), actor, played A.D.A. Jack McCoy on Law & Order
- Suzanne Whang (B.A. 1983), hostess of HGTV's House Hunters and House Hunters International
- Allison Williams (B.A. 2010), actress, Girls
- Henry Winkler (M.F.A. 1970), actor, best known as "Fonzie" on Happy Days
- Bellamy Young (B.A. 1991), Broadway and television actress

== Theatre ==
- Clare Barron (B.A. 2008), Pulitzer Prize finalist for Dance Nation
- Victoria Clark (B.A. 1982), Tony Award for Best Lead Actress for The Light in The Piazza
- Ali Ewoldt (B.A. in Psychology), first Asian-American Christine in The Phantom of the Opera on Broadway
- Mimi Lien (B.A. 1997), Tony Award for Best Scenic Design of a Musical for Natasha, Pierre, & The Great Comet of 1812
- a. k. payne (BA 2019), playwright and Susan Smith Blackburn Prize winner
- Michael P. Price (M.F.A. 1963), theatre producer and longest-serving artistic director in American theatre, executive director of Tony Award-winning Goodspeed Musicals
- Andy Sandberg (B.A. 2005/06), Tony Award-winning producer of Hair, 2009
- Ted Sperling (B.A. 1982), Tony Award for orchestration

== Others ==
=== Arts and humanities ===
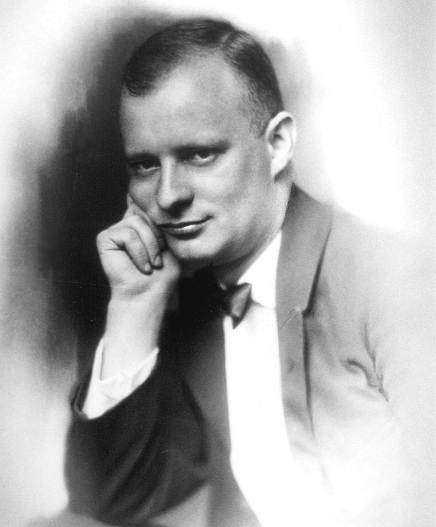
Paul Hindemith

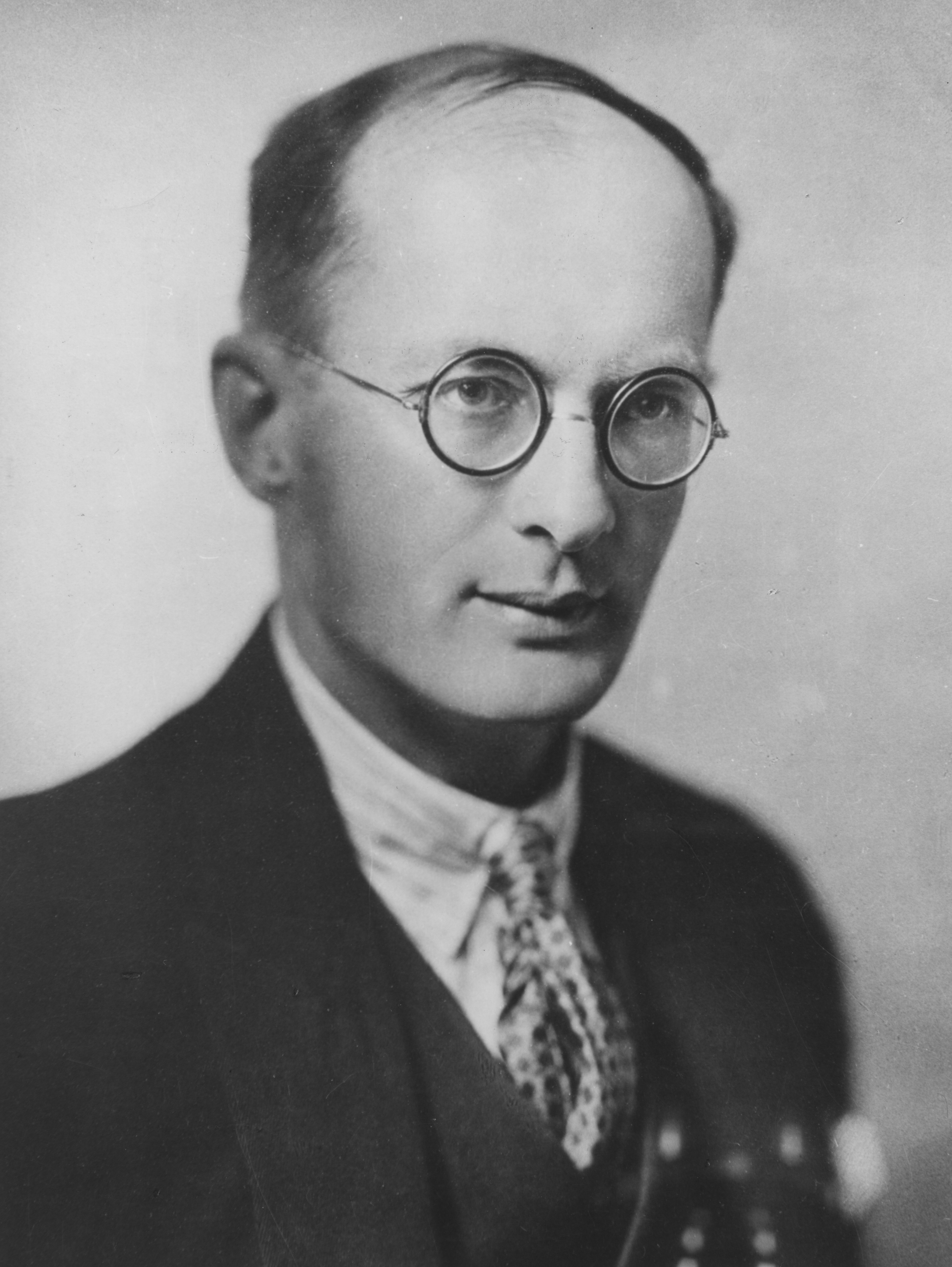
Bronisław Malinowski

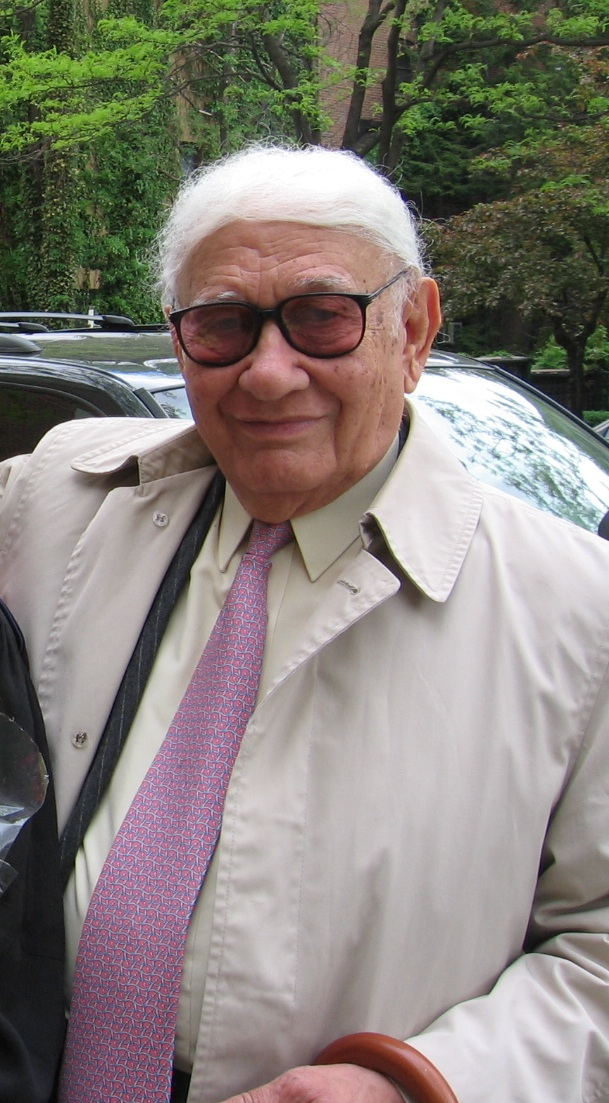
Aldo Parisot

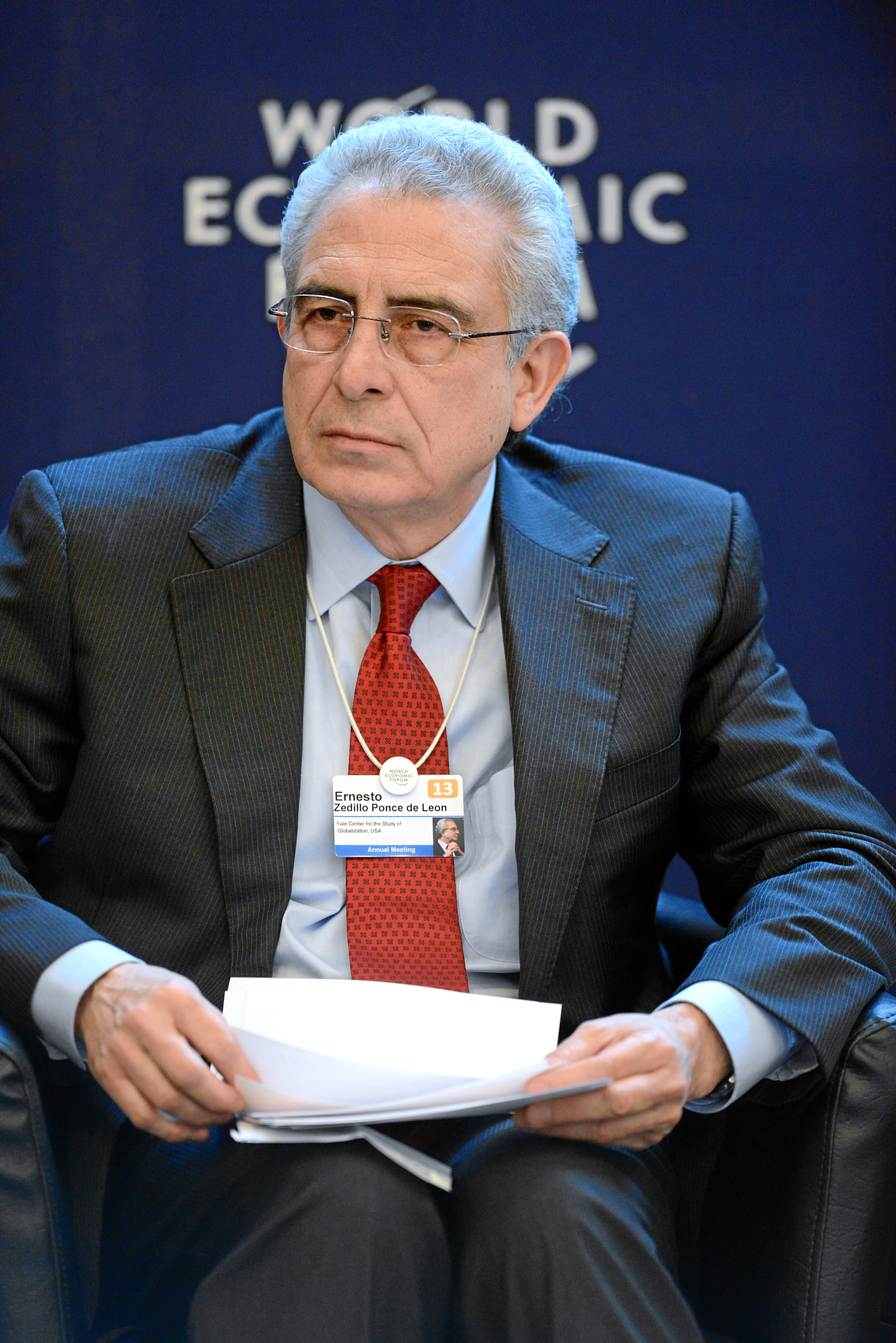
Ernesto Zedillo

- Robert P. Abelson, late Eugene Higgins Professor of Psychology and professor of Political Science
- Sydney E. Ahlstrom, historian of religion in America
- Josef Albers, artist
- Akhil Amar (B.A. 1980, J.D. 1984), law professor
- Kanichi Asakawa (Ph.D. 1902), historian, first Japanese professor at U.S. university
- Harold Bloom (Ph.D. 1955), writer and critic, author of The Anxiety of Influence, Shakespeare: The Invention of the Human and many other scholarly books
- John Morton Blum, professor of political history
- Cleanth Brooks, professor of English, world-renowned expert on writer William Faulkner
- Paul de Man, Sterling Professor of the Humanities, departments of French and Comparative Literature; literary critic posthumously controversial for articles he wrote for collaboration paper in occupied Belgium, one of which is widely held to be antisemitic
- Jacques Derrida, philosopher; held visiting professorship at invitation of Paul de Man
- Wai Chee Dimock, William Lampson Professor of English and American Studies
- Inge Druckrey, teacher of graphic design
- Steve Dunwell, photographer
- Isidore Dyen, professor of comparative linguistics and Austronesian languages
- Anne Fadiman, author of The Spirit Catches You and You Fall Down, Francis Writer in Residence at Yale
- Bassam Frangieh, scholar of Arabic language and literature
- Dan Friedman, graphic designer
- John Lewis Gaddis, Cold War historian
- Peter Gay, Enlightenment historian
- Louise Gluck, Pulitzer Prize winner, poet
- Erwin Hauer, sculptor
- Paul Hindemith, composer, musician, conductor, music theorist
- Donald Kagan, historian of ancient Greece
- Louis I. Kahn, architect
- Paul Kennedy, historian
- Harold Hongju Koh, dean of Yale Law School, assistant secretary of state for democracy, human rights and labor in the Clinton administration
- Alvin Lustig, graphic designer
- Bronisław Malinowski (1884–1942), pioneer in ethnographic anthropology; professor at Cornell University, Yale University, and Harvard University
- Julián Marías, philosopher, author of History of Philosophy
- Samuel Elmo Martin (1924–2009), linguist, developed the Yale Romanization system for transliterating Korean
- James Mitchell, actor, played Palmer Cortlandt on All My Children
- David Montgomery, professor of History
- Edmund S. Morgan, professor of History
- Elting E. Morison, historian, essayist, military biographer, was Professor of History and American Studies as well as the master of Timothy Dwight College between 1966 and 1972
- Aldo Parisot, musician and cellist
- Jaroslav Pelikan, historian, author of The Christian Tradition
- Peter C. Perdue, historian of Modern China
- Douglas W. Rae, political theorist
- Emir Rodríguez Monegal, professor of Latin American contemporary literature, founder of Mundo Nuevo
- Vincent Scully, Sterling Professor Professor of the History of Art in Architecture
- Jonathan Spence, historian, author of The Search For Modern China
- David Underdown, historian of 17th-century England
- Lee Watson, Broadway and opera lighting designer, author and Purdue University professor
- Dixon Wecter (Ph.D. 1936), Margaret Byrne Professor of United States History at the University of California, Berkeley
- Jay Winter, Charles J. Stille Professor of History; World War I specialist
- C. Vann Woodward, professor of history
- Mary C. Wright (1917–1970), historian of China, and first woman to be appointed a full professor in the arts and sciences faculty, in 1964
- Ernesto Zedillo (Ph.D. 1981), economics teacher and head of the Yale Center for the Study of Globalization, president of Mexico (1994–2000)

=== Life sciences and medicine ===
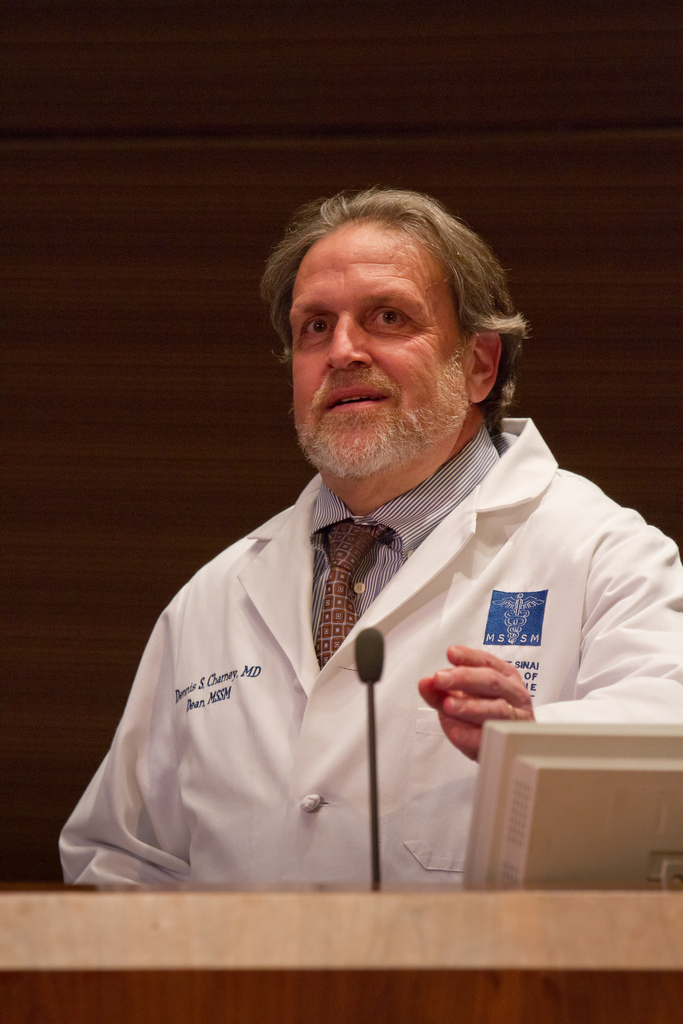
Dennis Charney

- John Carlson, molecular biologist
- Dennis S. Charney, expert in the neurobiology and treatment of mood and anxiety disorders
- Kenneth L. Davis, president and CEO of Mount Sinai Medical Center in New York City
- John Elefteriades, cardiac surgeon
- Donald Engelman, biochemist and cancer researcher
- Orvan Hess, M.D. (1906–2002), practitioner and researcher at the Yale School of Medicine, known for the fetal heart monitor
- Valerie Horsley, biologist
- Arthur Horwich, discovered the action of chaperonins, awarded the Shaw Prize in Life Science and Medicine
- G. Evelyn Hutchinson, zoologist, considered to be the father of modern limnology
- John S. Meyer, physician
- Sherwin B. Nuland, surgeon and author of How We Die
- Juan Rosai, professor of Pathology and Director of the Department of Anatomic Pathology at Yale University, 1985–91
- Philip Rubin, cognitive scientist, CEO, Haskins Laboratories
- J. Morris Slemons, formed the Department of Obstetrics at the School of Medicine in 1914
- Joan Steitz, biochemist, discoverer of snRNPs
- William Francis Gray Swann, physicist
- Richard D. Weisel, cardiac surgeon and current editor-in-chief of The Journal of Thoracic and Cardiovascular Surgery

=== Mathematics ===
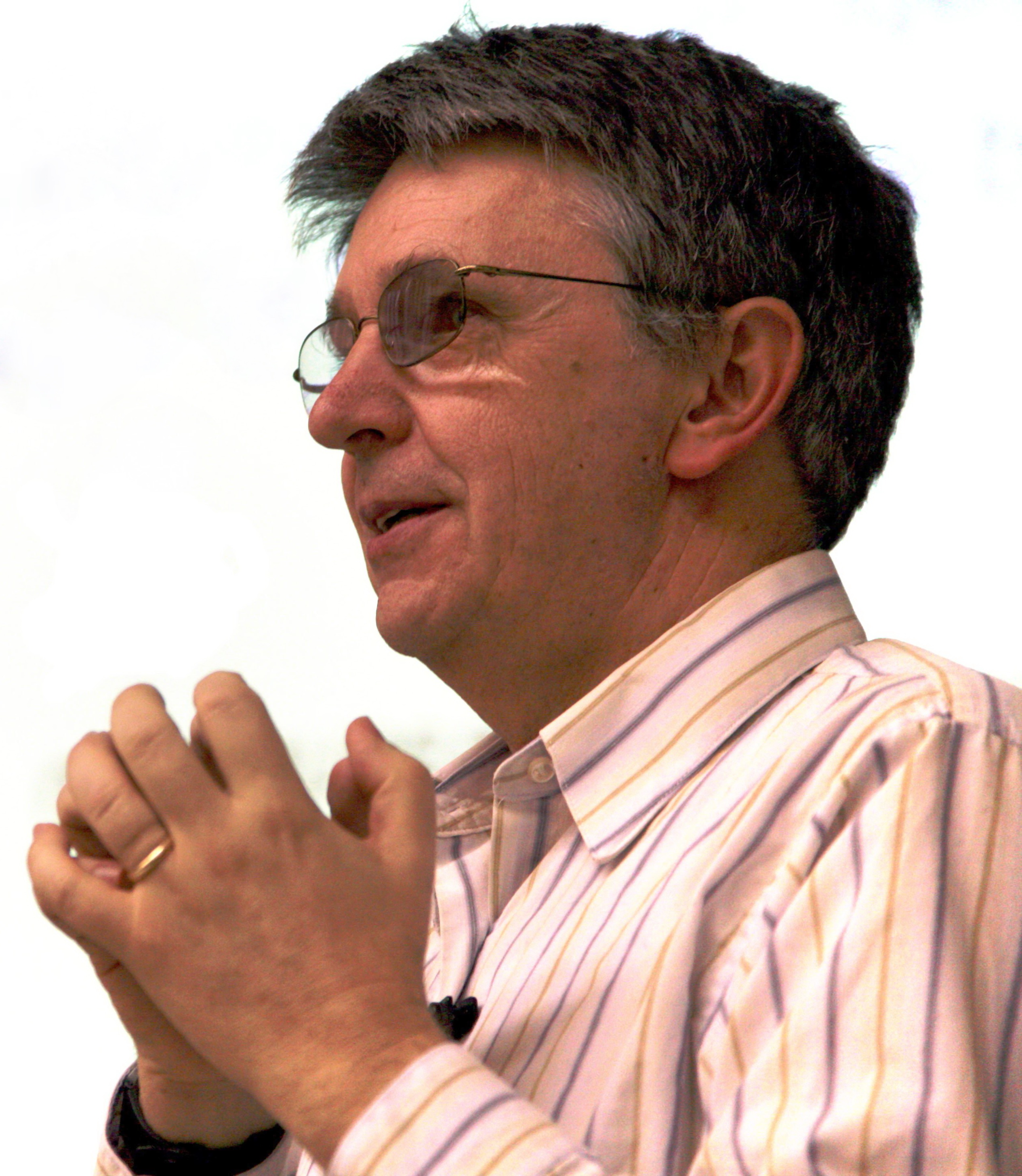
László Lovász

- Nathan Jacobson, leading algebraist, awarded the Leroy P. Steele Prize for lifetime achievement
- Shizuo Kakutani, mathematician, Kakutani fixed-point theorem
- Serge Lang, mathematician and activist
- László Lovász, Wolf Prize and Knuth Prize recipient for work in combinatorics
- Benoît Mandelbrot, mathematician known for fractal geometry
- Grigory Margulis, mathematician, Fields medallist and Wolf Prize winner
- George Mostow, Wolf Prize winner for work on lie groups and geometry
- Øystein Ore, mathematician
- Efim Zelmanov, mathematician, Fields medallist

=== Physical sciences and engineering ===
- Nick Barua (1980), business executive, entrepreneur, physicist and founder & CEO of AN Inc.
- Arthur Louis Day, geophysicist and volcanologist
- Phyllis M. Faber (1928–2023), environmental activist and agriculture botanist
- David Gelernter (1976), computer scientist, co-creator of the Linda programming language
- Josiah Willard Gibbs (1839–1903), theoretical physicist, chemist, and mathematician, first American Ph.D. in engineering
- Vernon W. Hughes, Sterling professor of Physics, recipient of the Rumford Prize and groundbreaking particle physicist
- W. Mark Saltzman, founder of Yale's Department of Biomedical Engineering
- Benjamin Silliman Jr., professor of chemistry, son of Benjamin Silliman, founder of Yale Chemistry Department
- Oktay Sinanoğlu, theoretical chemist and molecular biologist, and the youngest Yale full professor

=== Social sciences ===
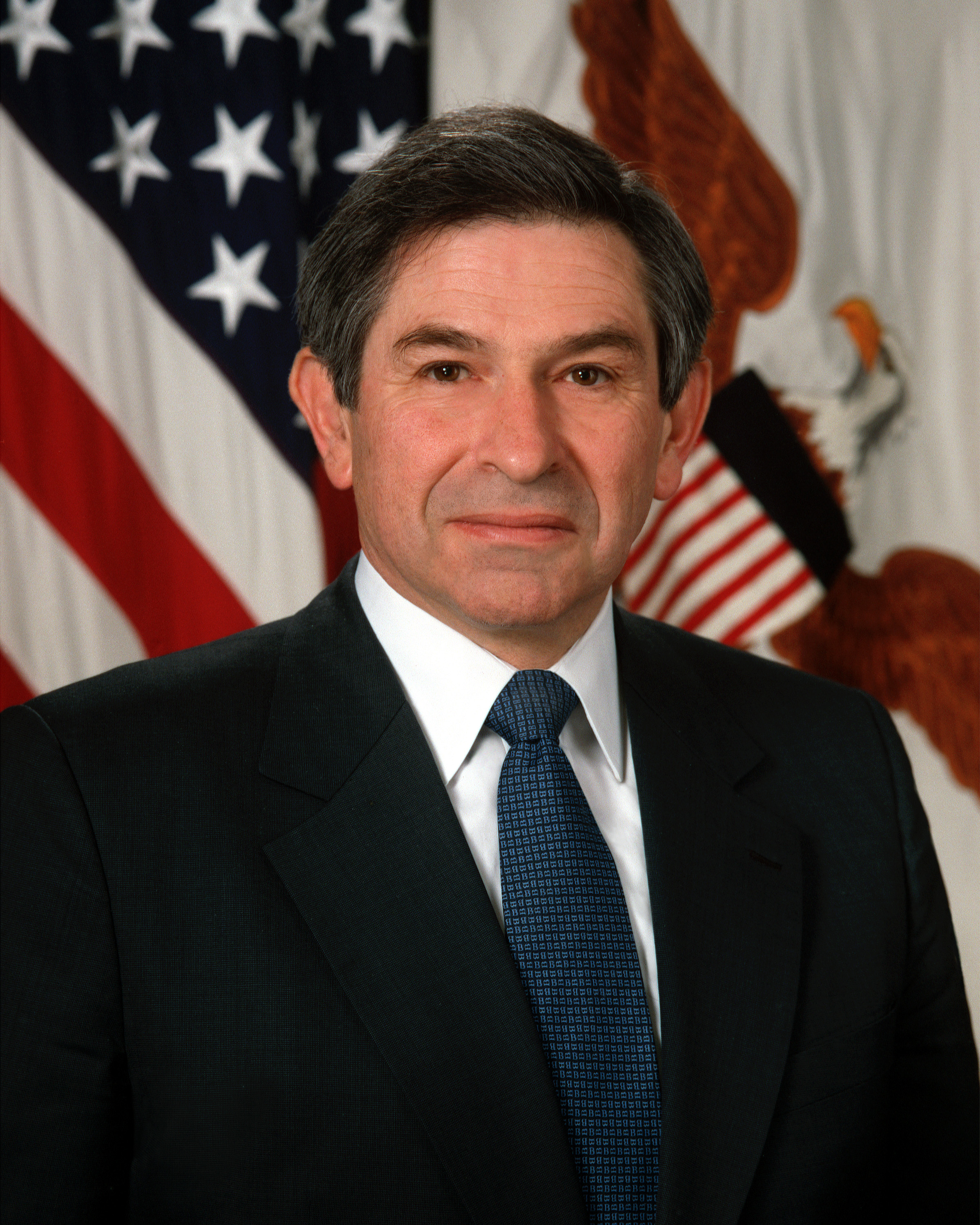
Paul Wolfowitz

- E. Wight Bakke, economist and industrial relations scholar; director of the Yale Labor and Management Center
- Neil W. Chamberlain, economist and industrial relations scholar; assistant director of the Yale Labor and Management Center
- Fred Rogers Fairchild (1877–1966), economist
- Irving Fisher, economist
- Jacques Armand Gauthier, comparative morphologist, paleontologist, and systematist
- John Geanakoplos, economist, current James Tobin professor of economics
- Joseph LaPalombara, Arnold Wolfers Professor of Political Science and Management Emeritus
- Neal E. Miller, James Rowland Angell Professor of Psychology
- William Nordhaus (1963), economist
- Arthur Okun, economist
- Lyman W. Porter (Ph.D. 1956), dean of University of California, Irvine's Paul Merage School of Business, 1972–83
- Herbert Scarf, economist
- James C. Scott, political scientist and anthropologist
- Arnold Wolfers, Sterling Professor of international relations and co-founder of the Yale Institute of International Studies, 1933–57
- Paul Wolfowitz, political science instructor 1970–72

== Heads of Collegiate School, Yale College, and Yale University ==
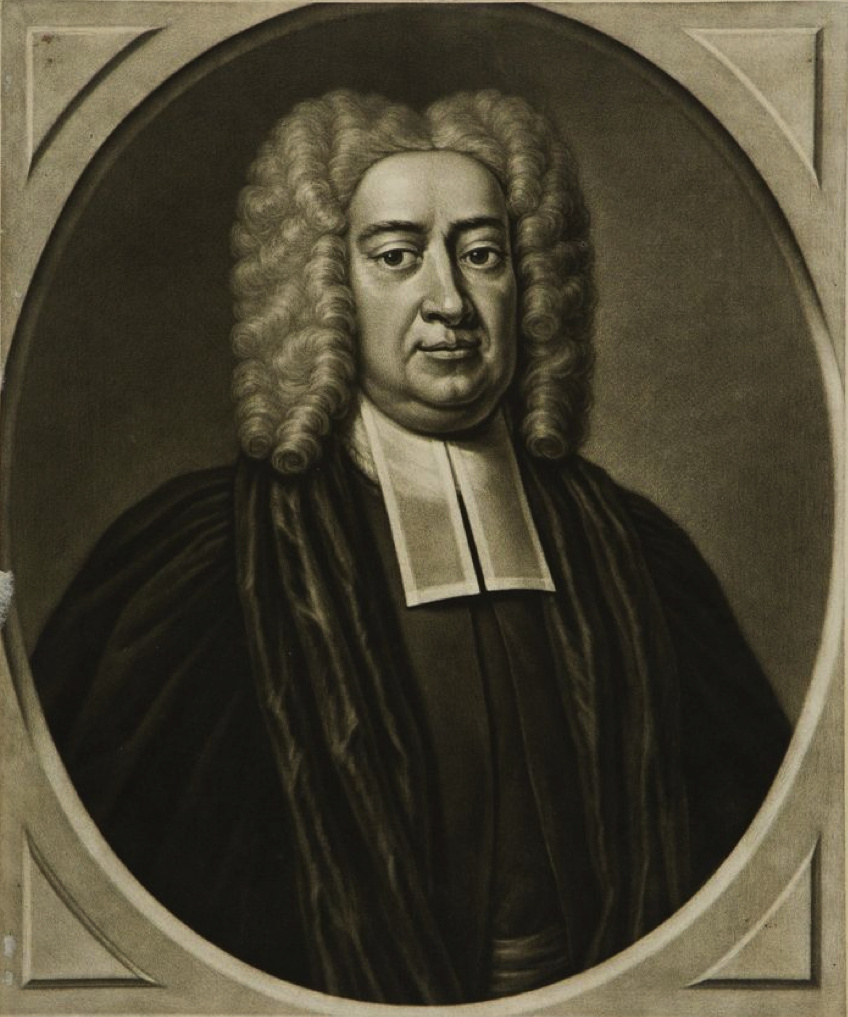
Timothy Cutler

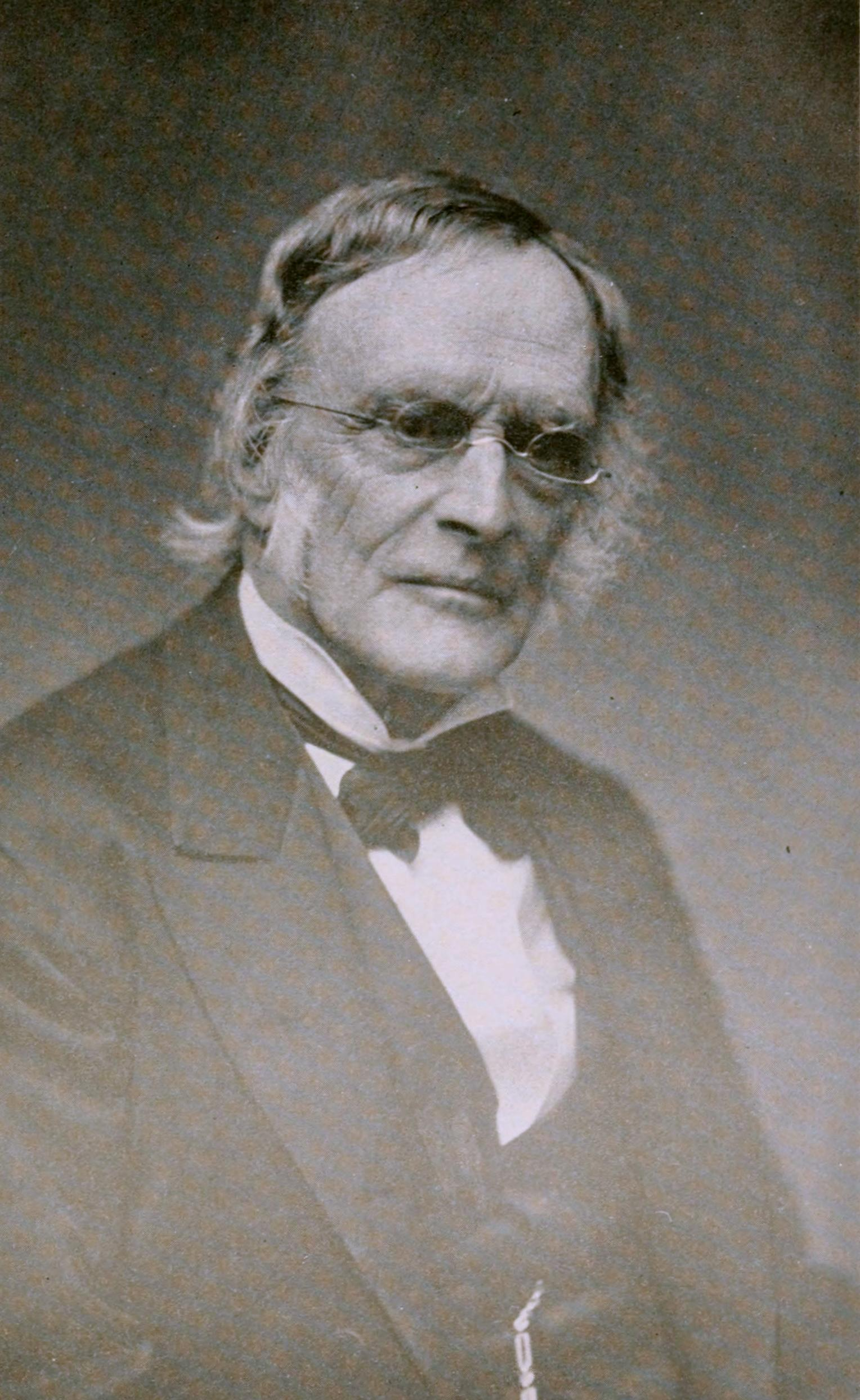
Theodore Dwight Woolsey

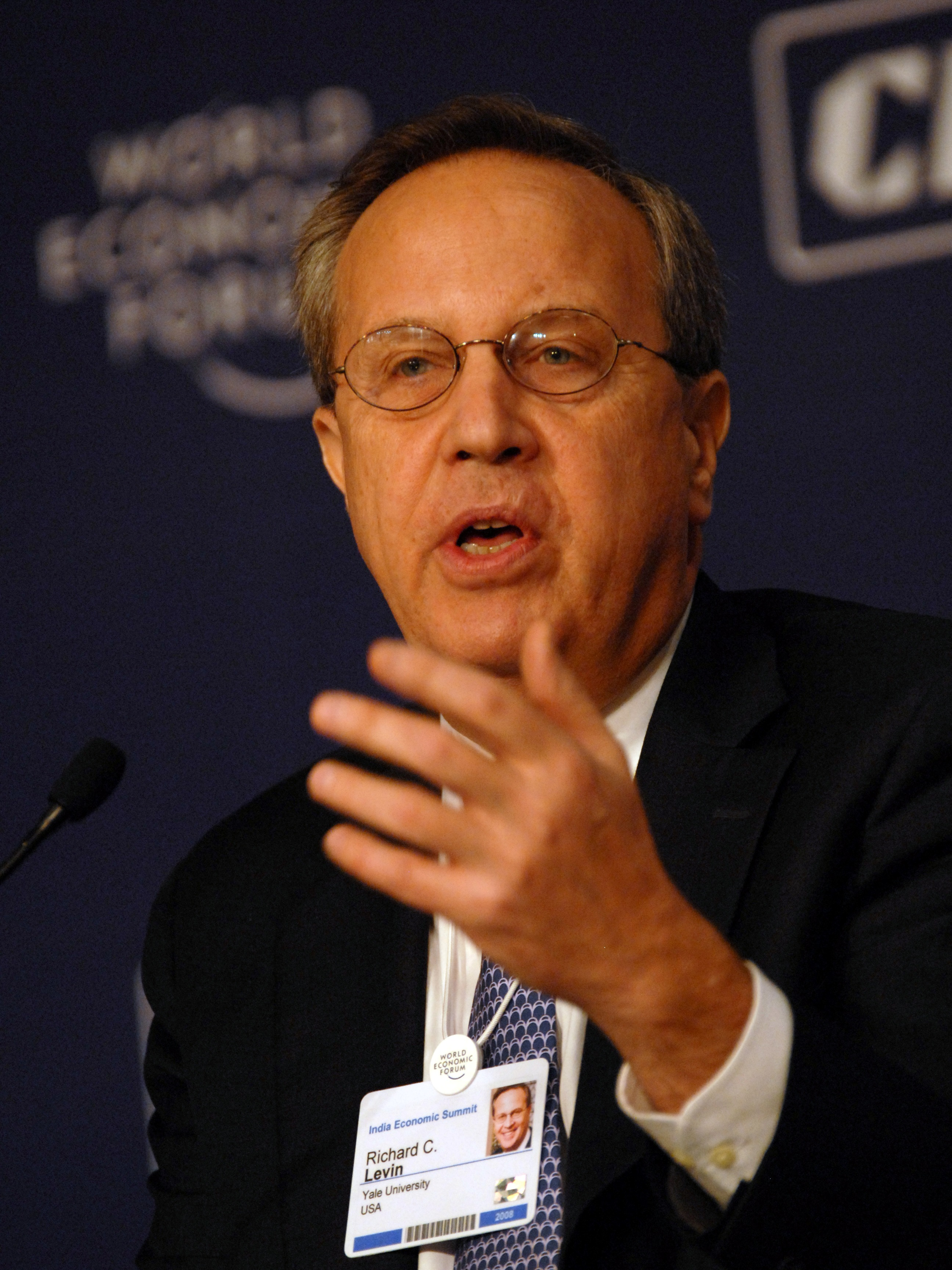
Richard Levin

	Rectors of Yale College	Birth–death	Years as rector
1	Rev. Abraham Pierson	1641–1707	1701–07 Collegiate School
2	Rev. Samuel Andrew	1656–1738	1707–19 (pro tempore)
3	Rev. Timothy Cutler	1684–1765	1719–26; 1718/9: renamed Yale College
4	Rev. Elisha Williams	1694–1755	1726–39
5	Rev. Thomas Clap	1703–1767	1740–45

	Presidents of Yale College	Birth–death	Years as president
5	Rev. Thomas Clap	1703–1767	1745–66
6	Rev. Naphtali Daggett	1727–1780	1766–77 (pro tempore)
7	Rev. Ezra Stiles	1727–1795	1778–95
8	Timothy Dwight IV	1752–181	1795–1817
9	Jeremiah Day	1773–1867	1817–46
10	Theodore Dwight Woolsey	1801–1899	1846–71
11	Noah Porter III	1811–1892	1871–86
12	Timothy Dwight V	1828–1916	1886–99; 1887: renamed Yale University
13	Arthur Twining Hadley	1856–1930	1899–1921
14	James Rowland Angell	1869–1949	1921–37
15	Charles Seymour	1885–1963	1937–51
16	Alfred Whitney Griswold	1906–1963	1951–63
17	Kingman Brewster Jr.	1919–1988	1963–77
18	Hanna Holborn Gray	1930–	1977–78 (acting)
19	A. Bartlett Giamatti	1938–1989	1978–86
20	Benno C. Schmidt Jr.	1942–	1986–92
21	Howard R. Lamar	1923–2023	1992–93 (acting)
22	Richard C. Levin	1947–	1993–2013
23	Peter Salovey	1958–	2013–2024
24	Maurie McInnis	1966–	2024–present

== See also ==
- Yale Corporation – including a list of corporation members
