= Abstraction (disambiguation) =

Abstraction is a process or result of generalization, removal of properties, or distancing of ideas from objects.

Abstraction or Abstractions may also refer to:

== Art ==
- Abstraction (art), art unconcerned with the literal depiction of things from the visible world

=== Works ===
- "Abstraction", a song by Sara Groves from her 2007 album Tell Me What You Know
- Abstractions (composition), 2016 orchestral suite by Anna Clyne
- Abstraction, Porch Shadows, Twin Lakes, Connecticut, 1916 photograph by Paul Strand
- Solo 2: Abstractions, 2001 studio album by Franco D'Andrea

== Mathematics, computer science, and engineering ==
- Abstraction (computer science), a process of hiding details of implementation in programs and data
  - List of abstractions (computer science)
- Abstraction (mathematics), a process of removing the dependence of a mathematical concept on real-world objects

=== Math and CS theory ===
- Full abstraction in denotational semantics
- Hypostatic abstraction, a formal operation that transforms a predicate into a relation
- Lambda abstraction, a definition of an anonymous function that produces a valid term in lambda calculus
- Predicate abstraction and the law of abstraction in formal logic
- Set abstraction (AKA set comprehension, set-builder notation)

=== Software and electrical engineering ===
- Hardware abstraction, an abstraction layer on top of hardware
- Abstraction layer, an application of abstraction in computing
- Leaky abstraction, a failure in implementing an abstraction
- Metalinguistic abstraction, the process of crossing language barriers to better understand a problem space
- A component of the presentation–abstraction–control (PAC) pattern
- Service abstraction, a design principle in the service-orientation paradigm

== Social sciences ==
- Abstraction (linguistics), use of terms for concepts removed from the objects to which they were originally attached
- Abstraction (sociology), a process of considering sociological concepts at a more theoretical level
- The result of a plural of abstraction (plurale abstractum), a linguistic phenomenon
- Selective abstraction in clinical psychology

== Law ==
- The first step of the Abstraction-Filtration-Comparison test, a computer software copyright procedure
- The subject of the abstraction principle (Abstraktionsprinzip) in the German abstract system of title transfer
- Abstracting electricity, the crime of diverting electricity around an electricity meter and/or using it without paying for it

== Chemistry ==
- Hydrogen atom abstraction, a class of chemical reactions where a hydrogen radical is removed from a substrate
- Nucleophilic abstraction, a nucleophilic attack which causes part or all of a ligand to be removed from a metal

== Miscellaneous ==
- Water abstraction (water extraction, water withdrawal, water intake), the process of taking water from any source

== See also ==
- Abstractionism may refer to:
  - Abstractionism, a theory of mind
  - Structuralism (philosophy of mathematics)
- Abstraction principle (disambiguation)
- Abstract (disambiguation)
