= Abstract =

Abstract or Abstracts may refer to:

- The former of abstract and concrete entities

== Summary publications ==
- Abstract (summary), in academic publishing
- Abstract (law), a summary of a legal document
  - Abstract of judgment, a summary of a court ruling
  - Property abstract (AKA abstract of title or title abstract), a summary of the documents affecting the title to a parcel of land
- An indexing and abstracting service or abstracts journal
  - List of academic databases and search engines — many of these have a name that includes the word "Abstracts"
- Two related series of books by George William James: The Bill James Baseball Abstract, published annually 1977–1988, and The Bill James Historical Baseball Abstract, first published in 1985
- An Abstract of a Book lately Published; Entitled, A Treatise of Human Nature, &c. Wherein the Chief Argument of that Book is farther Illustrated and Explained

== Mathematics ==
- Abstract group

See also:

- Abstract algebra, a branch of mathematics about working generically with sets with specific operations acting on their elements that have certain properties
  - List of abstract algebra topics
- Abstract structure

== Computer science ==
The abstract keyword is often used to mark a class/type or method as requiring subclassing to be used.

== Names and titles ==
- "Abstract", a 2017 episode (S9 E10 / #262) of the animated television series Adventure Time
- Abstract (album), 1962–63 album by Joe Harriott
- Abstract – The Art of Design, 2017 Netflix documentary series
- "The Abstract", nickname of American rapper and record producer Q-Tip
- Abstract City (2008–2011) or Abstract Sunday (2011–2015), New York Times (Magazine) blog by Christoph Niemann
- Kevin Abstract, the stage name of American rapper, singer, and producer Clifford Ian Simpson

== Miscellaneous ==
- Abstract art, artistic works that do not attempt to represent reality or concrete subjects
  - This can apply to any kind of art; for example: abstract music, music that is non-representational
- Abstract and concrete labour
- Abstract strategy game
  - List of abstract strategy games
- Abstract Wikipedia

== See also ==
- Abstraction (disambiguation)
