= Peter Anderson (designer) =

Northern Irish graphic designer and creative director

- Born: Belfast, Northern Ireland
- Education: Saint Martin's School of Art
- Occupations: Graphic designer creative director

Peter Anderson is a graphic designer and creative director from Belfast, Northern Ireland. In 2006 he founded Peter Anderson Studio, a London design company that produces television title sequences. The studio won the BAFTA Television Craft Award for titles and graphic identity in 2023 and 2025.

== Career ==
=== Typography and print ===
In the 1990s Anderson worked as a typographer and printmaker. With the photographer Platon and the stylist Claire Todd he produced a self-financed series of thirty prints combining typography and fashion photography, which was the subject of a 1996 article in Eye. The work led to a commission from Moschino for its autumn 1996 couture advertising campaign. He is one of thirty-eight typographers discussed in Teal Triggs's The Typographic Experiment (2003).

Anderson contributed the graphic scheme for Cayenne, a Belfast restaurant run by Paul Rankin and Jeanne Rankin. The project received a Wood Pencil at the 2001 D&AD Awards in the spatial design category, credited to the design group Interfield Design.

=== Peter Anderson Studio ===
Anderson founded Peter Anderson Studio in 2006. Based in Bermondsey, London, the studio employed a staff of fourteen as of 2025 and works across title sequences, on-screen graphics, branding and public art. Its television credits include EastEnders, Casualty, Doctor Who, Line of Duty, Dracula, Sanditon and Little Women. The studio also produced titles and graphics for Doctor Foster, Victoria and The Missing, and reworked the Doctor Who title sequence during Matt Smith's time in the role.

Anderson designed the title sequence for Sherlock (2010), which he has described as an attempt to place the viewer inside the character's perception for the length of the sequence.

The studio later produced titles for Good Omens (2019 and 2023); Anderson told the Television Academy the intention was to build worlds with graphics rather than simply convey information. A second-season sequence followed in 2023, with details that changed from episode to episode.

The studio also made titles for Bad Sisters (2022) and Sweetpea (2024).

For Margo's Got Money Troubles (2026), the studio filmed a physical set before adding a computer-generated figure; Anderson said the studio was glad to make something entirely handmade at that scale given industry concern about AI-generated material.

In 2019 Anderson took part in a masterclass on graphics and titles at the National Film and Television School alongside the title designer Daniel Kleinman.

=== Public art and place branding ===
Anderson's installations include a colour-changing neon spiral at Altnagelvin Area Hospital and a steel sculpture, Yesterday, Tomorrow and Us, in Newtownabbey. He has also worked on visual identities for places including Holyhead, Redcar and Lancaster.
