= Mikołaj Sęp Szarzyński =

Polish poet (c. 1550 – c. 1581)

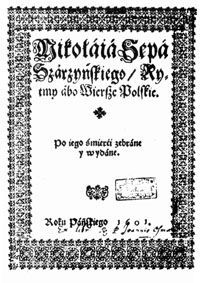
Cover of Rytmy abo wiersze polskie (Rhythms) from 1601

Mikołaj Sęp Szarzyński (c. 1550 – c. 1581) was an influential Polish poet of the late Renaissance who wrote in both Polish and Latin. He was a pioneer of the Baroque and the greatest representative of the metaphysical movement of the era in Poland. His love poems are often classed as mannerist. Jan Błoński has called Sęp Szarzyński a "mystical poet full of abstraction", and Wiktor Weintraub has called him "the most outstanding poet of the times of Jan Kochanowski". The poet's status in the history of Polish literature is controversial.

== Life ==
Little is known about Sęp Szarzyński's personal life. He was born in Zimna Woda near Lwów, the eldest of three sons, and educated at the universities of Wittenberg and Leipzig. His stay in Germany brought him close to Protestantism but he later became an ardent Catholic and his religious devotion is reflected in his poems. He probably died in Wolica in 1581 at the age of 31. He amasses all his writings in handwriting. After his death, Sęp Szarzyński's verse was collected by his brother Jakub and published under the title Rytmy abo wiersze polskie in 1601.

== Works ==
Mikołaj Sęp Szarzyński's work is often called "the sunset of the Polish Renaissance". His poems introduced the Baroque to Polish literature. The most important Szarzyński's poems are probably his sonnets. They are written according to the French model of the form. They were translated into English by Richard Sokoloski. The most important is perhaps the sonnet On the War We Wage Against Satan, the World, and the Body was translated into English by Michael J. Mikoś. Szarzyński made paraphrases of some Psalms, too.

== Sources ==
- Mikołaj Sęp Szarzyński: Rytmy polskie (Ad Oculos, 2004)
