= Lila Davachi =

Cognitive neuroscientist

- Occupation: Professor of Psychology
- Awards: Cognitive Science Society Young Investigator Award (2009) Lenfest Distinguished Columbia Faculty Award (2021)

Academic background
- Education: Barnard College (BA); Yale University (PhD)

Academic work
- Discipline: Cognitive Neuroscience
- Sub-discipline: Episodic Memory, Affective Neuroscience, Systems Neuroscience
- Institutions: Yale University

Lila Davachi is a neuroscientist known for her work on memory consolidation, event perception and representation, and how dynamic experiences are transformed into long-term memory She holds the position of professor of psychology at Yale University, following a career at Columbia University and New York University.

Davachi received several notable honors, including the Cognitive Neuroscience Society Young Investigator Award and Columbia University's Lenfest Distinguished Faculty Award. She has been elected as a member of the Society of Experimental Psychologists and is a member of the Memory Disorders Research Society.

== Biography ==
=== Early Life and Education ===
Davachi received a B.A. in psychology from Barnard College in 1992. She later attended Yale University, where she earned a Ph.D. in neurobiology in 1999. At Yale, she conducted doctoral research under the supervision of Patricia Goldman-Rakic, studying neural mechanisms involved in working memory and object recognition. After her doctoral studies, Davachi completed a postdoctoral fellowship in the Department of Brain and Cognitive Sciences at the Massachusetts Institute of Technology, where from 2000 to 2003 she conducted research using functional neuroimaging to study memory processes. She collaborated with researchers Anthony Wagner and Jason P. Mitchell to examine the role of medial temporal regions in episodic memory and recognition.

=== Academic Career ===
Davachi began her academic career at New York University in 2004, where she became a professor of psychology and neuroscience and served as a director of the Center for Learning, Memory and Emotion. In 2017, she joined Columbia University as a professor of psychology and research scientist at the Nathan Kline Institute. At Columbia she also worked with Nim Tottenham and Caroline Marvin; together, they restructured the psychology thesis research curriculum. In 2026, Davachi joined the faculty of Yale University as a professor of psychology in the Department of Psychology and a member of the Wu Tsai Institute.

Davachi's research has been supported by federal, private and industry funded research programs, including the National Institutes of Health (NIH), the National Institute of Mental Health (NIMH), the National Science Foundation (NSF), Dart Neuroscience, and the United States-Israel Binational Science Foundation (BSF). She has also received support from private foundations such as John Merck Fund and the Whitehead Foundation.

Beyond her research, Davachi has been involved in teaching, mentorship and advisory activities. At Columbia University she received the Lenfest Distinguished Faculty Award and the Provost's Senior Faculty Teaching Scholar Award. She has also served as a co-director of the university's STAR Research program, which provides research opportunities to students.

== Research ==
Davachi's research program focuses on how the brain encodes and organizes daily experiences into episodic memories and long-term knowledge. Her research on memory consolidation and waking rest has contributed to the development of AGES learning framework, informing approaches to education and professional training. Also, her work on the neural mechanisms of memory contributes to understanding how memory and cognition are affected by aging and psychiatric conditions.

Her early work examined how different forms of information are represented during episodic encoding. Davachi and colleagues provided evidence for distinct medial temporal lobe contributions to item and source memory, supporting the view that episodic memory involves multiple interacting processes rather than a single encoding mechanism. Davachi has also investigated the role of neural activity after learning in memory consolidation. She and colleagues found that correlations in neural activity between the hippocampus and cortical regions during the rest following learning were associated with associative memory later. This work showed that memory consolidation continues after the learning experience is over.

Another area of her research includes event segmentation. In her collaborative work with Youssef Ezzyat titled What Constitutes an Episode in Episodic Memory, Davachi showed that temporal boundaries within narratives influenced how information was remembered. They found that associations between the information presented across the event boundary were weaker than associations within the same event. The study provided evidence for a connection between the process of event segmentation and the way they are organized in an episodic memory system.

Other research has focused on the relationship between the physiological arousal and event segmentation. For instance, she and colleagues found that changes in context associated with event boundaries were accompanied by pupil dilation and were related to subsequent memory for temporal organization of experiences.

== Representative publications ==
- Clewett D., Gasser C., & Davachi L. (2020). Pupil-linked arousal signals track the temporal organization of events in memory. Nature Communications, 11(1), 4007. https://doi.org/10.1038/s41467-020-17851-9
- Davachi L. (2006). Item, context and relational episodic encoding in humans. Current Opinion in Neurobiology, 6(6), 693-700, https://doi.org/10.1016/j.conb.2006.10.012
- Davachi, L., Mitchell J. P., & Wagner, A. D. (2003). Multiple routes to memory: Distinct medial temporal lobe processes build item and source memories, PNAS, 100 (4), 2157-2162, https://doi.org/10.1073/pnas.0337195100
- Ezzyat, Y., & Davachi, L. (2011). What constitutes an episode in episodic memory? Psychological Science, 22(2), 243-252, https://doi.org/10.1177/0956797610393742
- Tambini A., Ketz N., & Davachi L. (2010). Enhanced brain correlations during rest are related to memory for recent experiences. Neuron, 65(2), 280-290. https://doi.org/10.1016/j.neuron.2010.01.001
