= Cas Holman =

American toy designer (born 1974)

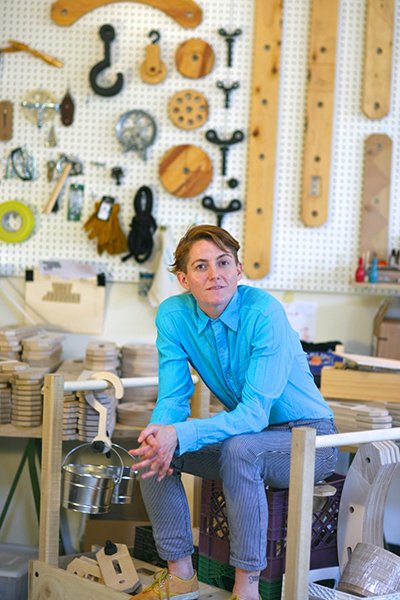
Cas Holman

Cas Holman (born 1974) is an American author and designer of toys and spaces that emphasize creativity through unstructured play. Previously a professor at Syracuse University and the Rhode Island School of Design, Holman is the founder and principal designer of the toy company Heroes Will Rise., designing for schools, museums, and playgrounds to promote collaborative, hands-on learning.

Holman is the subject of an episode of the Netflix series Abstract: The Art of Design titled "Cas Holman: Design for Play," focusing on her design philosophies.

She is the author with Lydia Denworth of Playful: How Play Shifts Our Thinking, Inspires Connection, and Sparks Creativity, published by Avery Publishing, a division of Penguin Random House, in October 2025.

== Early life and education ==
Cas grew up in a small town in Northern California, and the outdoors were a source of early inspiration and education. Cas was influenced early on through hands-on play by her mom, a Montessori teacher, and by her stepdad, a mechanic whose garage was a space for tinkering, tool-use, and seeing how things worked.

During time off from college, Cas spent a year and a half as a research assistant alongside her aunt and uncle, herpetologists researching biodiversity, on the Galápagos Islands. Cas graduated from the University of California, Santa Cruz in 1998, and earned an M.F.A in Fine Art from Cranbrook Academy of Art in 2005.

== Career ==
In 2003, Holman designed Geemo, a toy with flexible, magnetic limbs inspired by bone marrow. Geemo launched at the Museum of Modern Art’s Design Store in 2007 and is in the permanent collection of the Victoria and Albert Museum.

In 2011, she designed the High Line Children’s Workyard Kit in collaboration with Friends of the High Line Park, which brought loose parts play into a prominent public park setting. The initiative subsequently evolved into Holman's Rigamajig line of collaborative play sets, which have been implemented in schools and museum play spaces internationally. Rigamajig was highlighted in Becoming Brilliant: What Science Tells Us About Raising Successful Children (2016) as a tool that encourages children to build moving structures through open-ended play, fostering creativity and early engineering skills. It was also the subject of a research study by Purdue University and Concordia indicating that Rigamajig play materials promote collaborative group interaction and support the development of leadership skills.

Partnering with Anji Play (2014–2020), she collaborated with Cheng Xueqin to design learning materials for over 130 schools in China and supported pilot programs in the United States.

After spending two decades supporting teams at organizations such as Google, Nike, Disney Imagineering, and the LEGO Foundation, she now focuses on helping individuals develop leadership skills through approaches grounded in play.
