= Ralph Gilles =

American automobile designer and executive

Ralph Victor Gilles
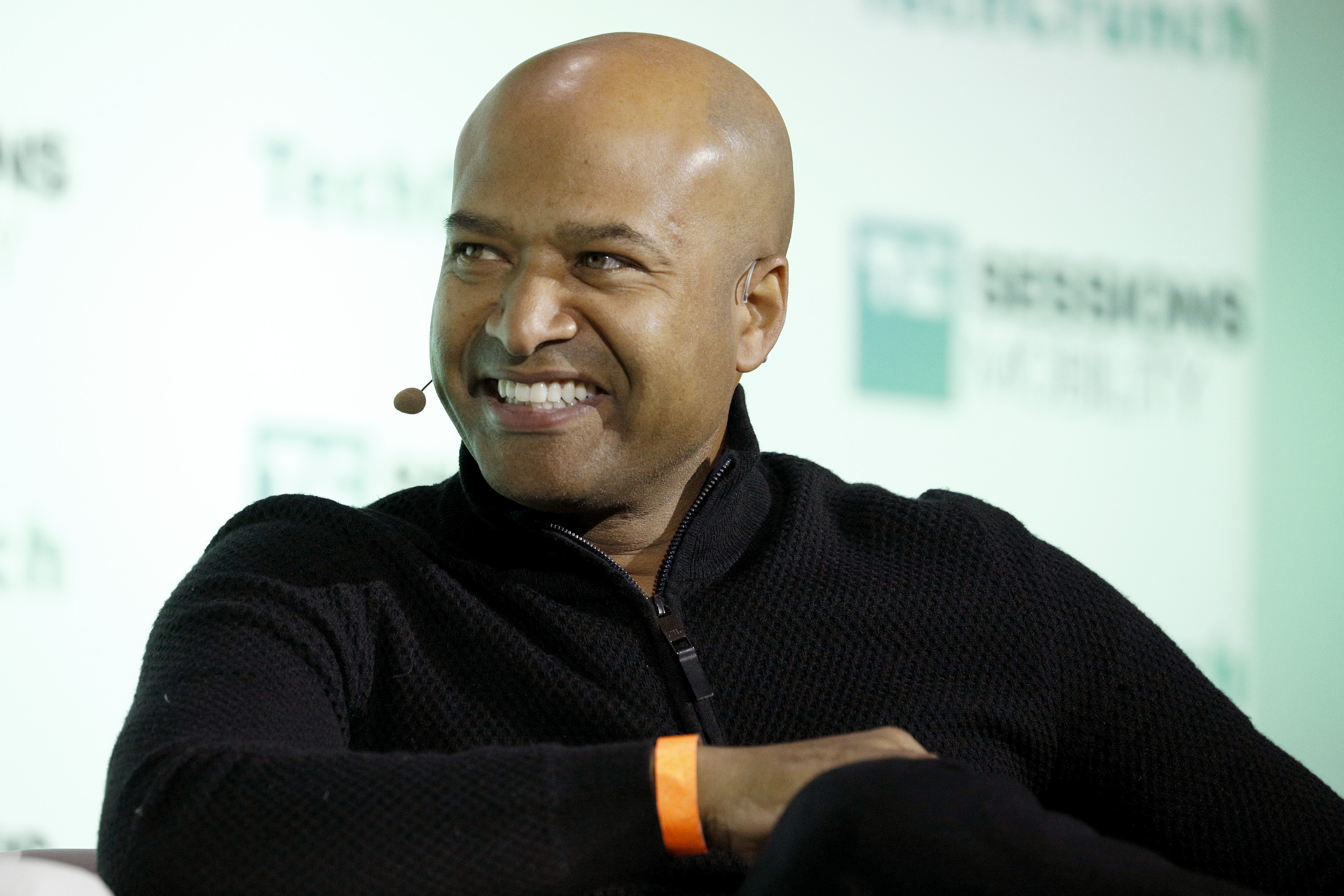
- Gilles in 2022
- Born: 14 January 1970 (age 56); New York City, U.S.
- Education: Michigan State University M.B.A
- Occupation: Automotive Designer
- Years active: 1992-Current
- Employer: Stellantis N.V
- Predecessor: Trevor Creed

Ralph Victor Gilles (French pronunciation: [ʒij]; born 14 January 1970) is an American automobile designer and executive, and current Chief Design Officer of Stellantis NV. His career started in 1992, where he joined Chrysler. During his time at Chrysler, he was responsible for designing the North American Car of the Year-winning 2005 Chrysler 300, as well as led the design team that created the 2013 SRT Dodge Viper. Gilles was the president and CEO of Chrysler's SRT brand and senior vice president of design at Chrysler before being promoted to head of design for Fiat Chrysler Automobiles in April 2015. Following FCA's merger with PSA Group forming the Stellantis group in 2021, he was appointed the Chief Design Officer of the newly merged company.

== Background ==
Born in New York City to Haitian immigrants, Gilles was raised in Montreal, Quebec. Gilles is said to have been drawing concept vehicles at the age of eight. When he was fourteen years old, his aunt Gisele Mouscardy sent one of his sketches to then Chrysler chairman Lee Iacocca. Gilles states that a reply came from K. Neil Walling, Chrysler's design chief at the time, suggesting he attend one of three design schools.

== Education ==
Gilles studied at Vanier College in Montreal. He attended the College for Creative Studies in Detroit, Michigan, and in 2002 received an Executive MBA from Michigan State University.

== Career ==
In 1992, Gilles joined the design office at Chrysler. During his initial years, he worked in the Design office, and in 2001 was promoted to Director in the design office, responsible for the large cars and family vehicles. In August 2008, he replaced the retiring Trevor Creed as Senior Vice President of Design. In October 2009, Gilles was promoted to president and CEO of the Dodge car brand. He was replaced as Dodge's CEO in June 2011, remaining Senior Vice President of Design and becoming CEO of Chrysler's Street and Racing Technology division. After four years as the CEO of the SRT and motorsports division, he was promoted to the head of design for Fiat Chrysler Automobiles. In 2021, the merger of French-based PSA Group with Fiat Chrysler automotive led to the creation of Stellantis N.V., where Gilles became the chief design officer.

During his career as an automotive designer, Gilles has been accredited for many designs. While beginning his career, he led the interior design of the Viper GTS/R, Dodge ESX2 Concept, Jeep Jeepster Prototypes. His designs would eventually reach production, the first being the 2002 Jeep Liberty, followed by the 2003 Dodge Viper. After his time doing interior design, the 2005 Chrysler 300c represented the first car whose design Gilles was responsible for. Currently, as Chief Design Officer at Stellantis, he has oversight of all the design operations for the multi-national car company.

== Film ==
Gilles was profiled in the first season of the Netflix docu-series Abstract: The Art of Design. Gilles was interviewed on episode 5, which was focused on automotive design.

== Awards ==
2003 Automotive Hall of Fame Young Leaders & Excellence Award.

2005 Motor Trend Car of the Year; Chrysler 300c.

2005 N’Digo Foundation N’Design Award.

2005 NV Magazine Innovation Award.

2023 EyesOn Design Lifetime Design Achievement Award.
