= Abstraction (linguistics) =

Use of terms for concepts removed from the objects to which they were originally attached

The term abstraction has a number of uses in the field of linguistics. It can describe the way some languages form abstract ideas from concrete objects or instances, as in the plural of abstraction. It can denote a process (also called object abstraction) in the development of language, whereby terms become used for concepts further removed from the objects to which they were originally attached. It can also denote a process applied by linguists themselves, whereby phenomena are considered without the details that are not relevant to the desired level of analysis.

== Object abstraction ==
Object abstraction, or simply abstraction, is a concept wherein terms for objects become used for more abstract concepts, which in some languages develop into further abstractions such as verbs and grammatical words (grammaticalisation). Abstraction is common in human language, though it manifests in different ways for different languages. In language acquisition, children typically learn object words first, and then develop from that vocabulary an understanding of the alternate uses of such words.

For example, the word "book" refers objectively to a physical object constructed with bound pages, but in abstraction refers to a particular literary creation —regardless of how many physical copies of the "book" there are, it is one "book." The word "book" then developed more abstract uses, such as in keeping a record (bookkeeping), or to keep a record of betting (booking), or as a verb for entering persons into a record ("to book"). Words may then be further abstracted and even have embedded puns, such as in 'to make history of oneself' ("he booked").

An early example of this kind of study came from John Horne Tooke, who in his conversational The Diversions of Purley (1786), proposed that the abstract word through came to English through both sound change and derivation from the Gothic:

"For as the French peculiar preposition CHEZ is no other than the Italian substantive CASA or CA, so is the English preposition THOROUGH no other than the Gothic substantive dauro, or the Teutonic substantive thuruh: and like them, means door, gate, passage. I am persuaded that Door and Through have one and the same Gothic origin dauro, mean one and the same thing, and are in fact one and the same word."

Tooke was incorrect about "through," but his insights about the way words migrated via geography, language, sound change, and meaning were innovative, and fundamentally correct.

== Abstraction as used by linguists ==
=== Syntax, semantics, and pragmatics ===
The relation among syntax, semantics, and pragmatics has also been cashed out in terms of what could be called an "abstraction hierarchy." For instance, Rudolf Carnap in his Introduction to Semantics (1942, Harvard University Press) writes:

If… explicit reference is made to the speaker, or, to put it in more general terms, to the user of a language, then we assign it to the field of pragmatics. (Whether in this case reference to designata is made or not makes no difference for this classification.) If we abstract from the user of the language and analyze only the expressions and their designata, we are in the field of semantics. And if, finally, we abstract from the designata also and analyze only the relations between the expressions, we are in (logical) syntax. The whole science of language, consisting of the three parts mentioned, is called semiotics. (p. 9)

A related statement was made a few years earlier by Carnap's fellow American philosopher Charles W. Morris, PhD student of the sociologist and pragmatist philosopher George Herbert Mead, and heavily influenced by the pragmatist and founder of (analytical) semiotics, Charles Sanders Peirce:

"Syntactics, as the study of the syntactical relations of signs to one another in abstraction from the relations of signs to objects [i.e., semantics] or to interpreters [i.e., pragmatics], is the best developed of all the branches of semiotic." (p. 13)

The relation between abstraction and Morris' influential trichotomy is a matter of ongoing discussion.

=== Emic units ===
A kind of abstraction commonly considered in linguistics is the phoneme, which abstracts speech sounds in such a way as to neglect details that cannot serve to differentiate meaning. Other analogous kinds of abstractions (sometimes called "emic units") include morphemes, graphemes and lexemes.

=== Metaphor ===
Paul Ricœur in his book The Rule of Metaphor details metaphor as a special type of abstraction of the shared connotation of two (superficially) different words.
