= Abstraction =

Process of generalization

Abstraction is the process of generalizing rules and concepts from specific examples, literal (real or concrete) signifiers, first principles, or other methods. The result of the process, an abstraction, is a concept that acts as a common noun for all subordinate concepts and connects any related concepts as a group, field, or category.

Abstractions and levels of abstraction play an important role in the theory of general semantics originated by Alfred Korzybski. Anatol Rapoport wrote, "Abstracting is a mechanism by which an infinite variety of experiences can be mapped on short noises (words)." An abstraction can be constructed by filtering the information content of a concept or an observable phenomenon, selecting only those aspects that are relevant for a particular purpose. For example, abstracting a leather soccer ball to the more general idea of a ball selects only the information on general ball attributes and behavior, excluding but not eliminating the other phenomenal and cognitive characteristics of that particular ball. In a type–token distinction, a type (e.g., a 'ball') is more abstract than its tokens (e.g., 'that leather soccer ball').

== Origins ==
Thinking in abstractions is considered by anthropologists, archaeologists, and sociologists to be one of the key traits in modern human behaviour, believed to have developed between 50,000 and 100,000 years ago. Its development is likely to have been closely connected with the development of human language, which (whether spoken or written) appears to both involve and facilitate abstract thinking. Max Müller suggests an interrelationship between metaphor and abstraction in the development of thought and language.

=== History ===
Abstraction involves the induction of ideas or the synthesis of particular facts into one general theory about something. Its opposite, specification, is the analysis or breaking down of a general idea or abstraction into concrete facts. Abstraction can be illustrated by Francis Bacon's Novum Organum (1620), a book of modern scientific philosophy written in the late Jacobean era of England to encourage modern thinkers to collect specific facts before making any generalizations.

Bacon used and promoted induction as an abstraction tool; his induction complemented but was distinct from the ancient deductive-thinking approach that had dominated the Western intellectual world since the times of Greek philosophers like Thales, Anaximander, and Aristotle. Thales (c. 624–546 BCE) believed that everything in the universe comes from one main substance, water. He deduced or specified from a general idea, "everything is water," to the specific forms of water, such as ice, snow, fog, and rivers.

Early-modern scientists used the approach of abstraction (going from particular facts collected into one general idea). Newton (1642–1727) derived the motion of the planets from Copernicus' (1473–1543) simplification, that the Sun is the center of the Solar System; Kepler (1571–1630) compressed thousands of measurements into one expression to finally conclude that Mars moves in an elliptical orbit about the Sun; Galileo (1564–1642) compressed the results of one hundred specific experiments into the law of falling bodies.

John Locke proposed that all “general words” (such as man or animal, for example) come from a process of abstraction of “particular ideas” and proper names in his work An Essay Concerning Human Understanding.

== Themes ==
=== Compression ===
An abstraction can be seen as a compression process, mapping multiple different pieces of constituent data to a single piece of abstract data; based on similarities in the constituent data, for example, many different physical cats map to the abstraction "CAT". This conceptual scheme emphasizes the inherent equality of both constituent and abstract data, thus avoiding problems arising from the distinction between "abstract" and "concrete". In this sense the process of abstraction entails the identification of similarities between objects and the process of associating these objects with an abstraction (which is itself an object).

For example, picture 1 below illustrates the concrete relationship "Cat sits on Mat".

Chains of abstractions can be construed, moving from neural impulses arising from sensory perception to basic abstractions such as color or shape, to experiential abstractions such as a specific cat, to semantic abstractions such as the "idea" of a CAT, to classes of objects such as "mammals" and even categories such as "object" as opposed to "action".

For example, graph 1 below expresses the abstraction "agent sits on location". This conceptual scheme entails no specific hierarchical taxonomy (such as the one mentioned involving cats and mammals), only a progressive exclusion of detail.

=== Instantiation ===
Non-existent things in any particular place and time are often seen as abstract. By contrast, instances, or members, of such an abstract thing might exist in many different places and times.

Those abstract things are then said to be multiply instantiated, in the sense of picture 1, picture 2, etc., shown below. It is not sufficient, however, to define abstract ideas as those that can be instantiated and to define abstraction as the movement in the opposite direction to instantiation. Doing so would make the concepts "cat" and "telephone" abstract ideas since despite their varying appearances, a particular cat or a particular telephone is an instance of the concept "cat" or the concept "telephone". Although the concepts "cat" and "telephone" are abstractions, they are not abstract in the sense of the objects in graph 1 below. We might look at other graphs, in a progression from cat to mammal to animal, and see that animal is more abstract than mammal; but on the other hand mammal is a harder idea to express, certainly in relation to marsupial or monotreme.

Perhaps confusingly, some philosophies refer to tropes (instances of properties) as abstract particulars – e.g., the particular redness of a particular apple is an abstract particular. This is similar to qualia and sumbebekos.

=== Material process ===
Still retaining the primary meaning of 'abstrere' or 'to draw away from', the abstraction of money, for example, works by drawing away from the particular value of things, allowing completely incommensurate objects to be compared (see the section on 'Physicality' below).

The state (polity) as both concept and material practice exemplifies the two sides of this process of abstraction. Conceptually, 'the current concept of the state is an abstraction from the much more concrete early-modern use as the standing or status of the prince, his visible estates'. At the same time, materially, the 'practice of statehood is now constitutively and materially more abstract than at the time when princes ruled as the embodiment of extended power'.

=== Ontological status ===
The way that physical objects, like rocks and trees, have being differs from the way that properties of abstract concepts or relations have being, for example the way the concrete, particular, individuals pictured in picture 1 exist differs from the way the concepts illustrated in graph 1 exist. That difference accounts for the ontological usefulness of the word "abstract". The word applies to properties and relations to mark the fact that, if they exist, they do not exist in space or time, but that instances of them can exist, potentially in many different places and times.

=== Physicality ===
A physical object (a possible referent of a concept or word) is considered concrete (not abstract) if it is a particular individual that occupies a particular place and time. However, in the secondary sense of the term 'abstraction', this physical object can carry materially abstracting processes. For example, record-keeping aids throughout the Fertile Crescent included calculi (clay spheres, cones, etc.) which represented counts of items, probably livestock or grains, sealed in containers. According to Schmandt-Besserat 1981, these clay containers contained tokens, the total of which was the count of objects being transferred. The containers thus served as something of a bill of lading or an accounts book. In order to avoid breaking open the containers for the count, marks were placed on the outside of the containers. These physical marks, in other words, acted as material abstractions of a materially abstract process of accounting, using conceptual abstractions (numbers) to communicate its meaning.

Abstract things are sometimes defined as those things that do not exist in reality or exist only as sensory experiences, like the color red. That definition, however, suffers from the difficulty of deciding which things are real (i.e., which things exist in reality). For example, it is difficult to agree to whether concepts like God, the number three, and goodness are real, abstract, or both.

An approach to resolving such difficulty is to use predicates as a general term for whether things are variously real, abstract, concrete, or of a particular property (e.g., good). Questions about the properties of things are then propositions about predicates, whose propositions remain to be evaluated by the investigator. In the graph 1 below, the graphical relationships like the arrows joining boxes and ellipses might denote predicates.

=== Referencing and referring ===
Abstractions sometimes have ambiguous referents. For example, "happiness" can mean experiencing various positive emotions, but can also refer to life satisfaction and subjective well-being. Likewise, "architecture" refers not only to the design of safe, functional buildings, but also to elements of creation and innovation which aim at elegant solutions to construction problems, to the use of space, and to the attempt to evoke an emotional response in the builders, owners, viewers, and users of the building. Architecture also refers to the __abstract__ arrangement, design of computer code to implement complex software systems.

=== Simplification and ordering ===
Abstraction uses a strategy of simplification, wherein formerly concrete details are left ambiguous, vague, or undefined; thus effective communication about things in the abstract requires an intuitive or common experience between the communicator and the communication recipient. This is true for all verbal/abstract communication.

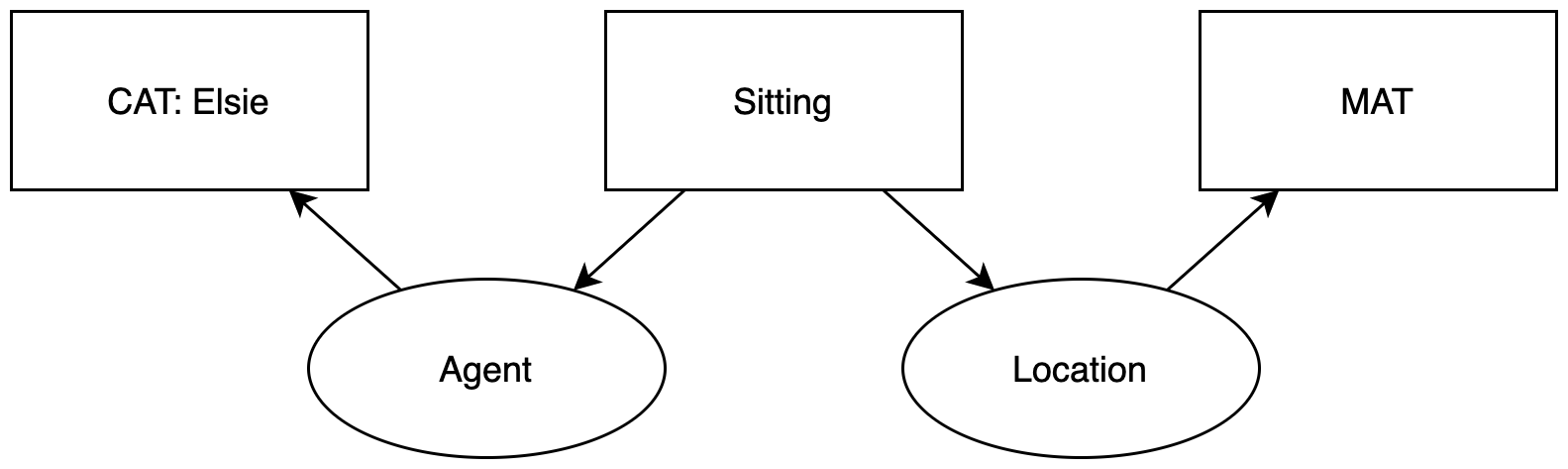
Conceptual graph for A Cat sitting on the Mat (graph 1)

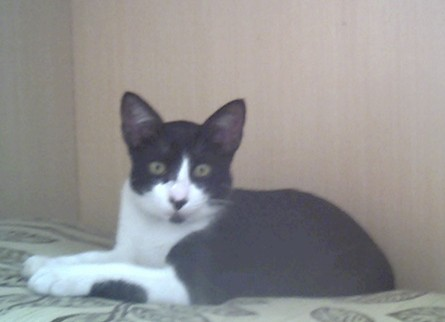
Cat on Mat (picture 1)

For example, many different things can be red. Likewise, many things sit on surfaces (as in picture 1, to the right). The property of redness and the relation sitting-on are therefore abstractions of those objects. Specifically, the conceptual diagram graph 1 identifies only three boxes, two ellipses, and four arrows (and their five labels), whereas the picture 1 shows much more pictorial detail, with the scores of implied relationships as implicit in the picture rather than with the nine explicit details in the graph.

Graph 1 details some explicit relationships between the objects of the diagram. For example, the arrow between the agent and CAT:Elsie depicts an example of an is-a relationship, as does the arrow between the location and the MAT. The arrows between the gerund/present participle SITTING and the nouns agent and location express the diagram's basic relationship; "agent is SITTING on location"; Elsie is an instance of CAT.

Although the description sitting-on (graph 1) is more abstract than the graphic image of a cat sitting on a mat (picture 1), the delineation of abstract things from concrete things is somewhat ambiguous; this ambiguity or vagueness is characteristic of abstraction. Thus something as simple as a newspaper might be specified to six levels, as in Douglas Hofstadter's illustration of that ambiguity, with a progression from abstract to concrete in Gödel, Escher, Bach (1979):

(1) a publication

(2) a newspaper

(3) The San Francisco Chronicle

(4) the May 18 edition of The San Francisco Chronicle

(5) my copy of the May 18 edition of The San Francisco Chronicle

(6) my copy of the May 18 edition of The San Francisco Chronicle as it was when I first picked it up (as contrasted with my copy as it was a few days later: in my fireplace, burning)

An abstraction can thus encapsulate each of these levels of detail with no loss of generality. But perhaps a detective or philosopher/scientist/engineer might seek to learn about something, at progressively deeper levels of detail, to solve a crime or a puzzle.

=== Thought processes ===
In philosophical terminology, abstraction is the thought process wherein ideas are distanced from objects. But an idea can be symbolized.

== As used in different disciplines ==
=== In art ===
Typically, abstraction is used in the arts as a synonym for abstract art in general. Strictly speaking, it refers to art unconcerned with the literal depiction of things from the visible world—it can, however, refer to an object or image which has been distilled from the real world, or indeed, another work of art. Artwork that reshapes the natural world for expressive purposes is called abstract; that which derives from, but does not imitate a recognizable subject is called nonobjective abstraction. In the 20th century the trend toward abstraction coincided with advances in science, technology, and changes in urban life, eventually reflecting an interest in psychoanalytic theory. Later still, abstraction was manifest in more purely formal terms, such as color, freedom from objective context, and a reduction of form to basic geometric designs.

=== In computer science ===
Software developers create abstract models both as design artifacts and in source code that support the development of software systems by compartmentalizing complexity in order to achieve benefits such as reducing effort, enhancing software quality, and enabling software reuse.

=== In history ===
Francis Fukuyama defines history as "a deliberate attempt of abstraction in which we separate out important from unimportant events". The subject has also been compared to a science examining the development of mankind using the context of the past and present. Additionally, in Peter Charles Hoffer's The Historians' Paradox: The Study of History in Our Time, the history of history (historiography) is initially defined as the history of informal argumentation used by historians for studying the past. Immanuel Kant in his Idea for a Universal History with a Cosmopolitan Purpose views all historical progress as leading to a progressive, free, and cosmopolitan future; the inevitable realization of human freedom is seen in Kant's eyes as equivalent to how entropy increases within a thermodynamic system.

=== In linguistics ===
Researchers in linguistics frequently apply abstraction so as to allow an analysis of the phenomena of language at the desired level of detail. A commonly used abstraction, the phoneme, abstracts speech sounds in such a way as to neglect details that cannot serve to differentiate meaning. Other analogous kinds of abstractions (sometimes called "emic units") considered by linguists include morphemes, graphemes, and lexemes.

Abstraction also arises in the relation between syntax, semantics, and pragmatics. Pragmatics involves considerations that make reference to the user of the language; semantics considers expressions and what they denote (the designata) abstracted from the language user; and syntax considers only the expressions themselves, abstracted from the designata. Semantics (especially formal semantics) in particular relies on formal and abstract methods, including but not restricted to model theory, lambda calculus, and formal logic. To give an example of abstraction in semantics, Gottlob Frege used his system of formal logic in order to study natural languages, particularly in the form of abstracting and generalizing the forms of certain kinds of sentences.

=== In mathematics ===
Abstraction in mathematics is the process of extracting the underlying structures, patterns or properties of a mathematical concept or object, removing any dependence on real-world objects with which it might originally have been connected, and generalizing it so that it has wider applications or matching among other abstract descriptions of equivalent phenomena. Abstraction can even be said to be a mathematician's "most important tool".

The advantages of abstraction in mathematics are:

- It reveals deep connections between different areas of mathematics.
- Known results in one area can suggest conjectures in another related area.
- Techniques and methods from one area can be applied to prove results in other related area.
- Patterns from one mathematical object can be generalized to other similar objects in the same class.

The main disadvantage of abstraction is that highly abstract concepts are more difficult to learn, and might require a degree of mathematical maturity and experience before they can be assimilated.

=== In music ===
In music, the term abstraction can be used to describe improvisatory approaches to interpretation, and may sometimes indicate abandonment of tonality. Atonal music has no key signature, and is characterized by the exploration of internal numeric relationships.

=== In neurology ===
A recent meta-analysis suggests that the verbal system has a greater engagement with abstract concepts when the perceptual system is more engaged in processing concrete concepts. This is because abstract concepts elicit greater brain activity in the inferior frontal gyrus and middle temporal gyrus compared to concrete concepts which elicit greater activity in the posterior cingulate, precuneus, fusiform gyrus, and parahippocampal gyrus. Other research into the human brain suggests that the left and right hemispheres differ in their handling of abstraction. For example, one meta-analysis reviewing human brain lesions has shown a left hemisphere bias during tool usage.

=== In philosophy ===
Abstraction in philosophy is the process (or, to some, the alleged process) in concept formation of recognizing some set of common features in individuals, and on that basis forming a concept of that feature. The notion of abstraction is important to understanding some philosophical controversies surrounding empiricism and the problem of universals. It has also recently become popular in formal logic under predicate abstraction. Another philosophical tool for the discussion of abstraction is thought space.

John Locke defined abstraction in An Essay Concerning Human Understanding:

"So words are used to stand as outward marks of our internal ideas, which are taken from particular things; but if every particular idea that we take in had its own special name, there would be no end to names. To prevent this, the mind makes particular ideas received from particular things become general; which it does by considering them as they are in the mind—mental appearances—separate from all other existences, and from the circumstances of real existence, such as time, place, and so on. This procedure is called abstraction. In it, an idea taken from a particular thing becomes a general representative of all of the same kind, and its name becomes a general name that is applicable to any existing thing that fits that abstract idea." (2.11.9)

Danish philosopher and existentialist Søren Kierkegaard argued that, since human thought always works by abstracting from a concrete existent, i.e., whenever one thinks of some concrete thing, he must transform it into an abstract generality (the impossibility of cognizing every single detail about any concrete thing, among other reasons, makes this necessary), it is impossible for any thinker "to think existence per se." This makes Kierkegaard repudiate "Hegel's reply to Kant," the latter of which Kierkegaard acknowledges as being right about the impotence of human thought to grasp the "thing-in-itself." According to Kierkegaard, Hegel, instead of reminding Kant that thought "has nothing to do with actuality," attempts to answer the latter using pure thinking, an attempt Kierkegaard sees as categorically defunct. In Concluding Unscientific Postscript he writes:

Instead of admitting that idealism is in the right—but, please note, in such a way that one would reject the whole question about actuality (about a self-withholding an sich) in relation to thinking as a temptation, which like all other temptations cannot possibly be canceled by surrendering to it—instead of putting a stop to Kant's deviation, which brought actuality into relation to thinking, instead of referring actuality to the ethical, Hegel certainly went further, inasmuch as he became fantastical and overcame the skepticism of idealism by means of pure thinking... The dubiousness of "the method" is already apparent in Hegel's relation to Kant. A skepticism that confiscates thinking itself cannot be halted by being thought through, because this must indeed be done by thinking, which is on the side of the mutineer. It must be broken off. To reply to Kant within the fantastical Schattenspiel [shadow play] of pure thinking is precisely not to reply to him. —The only an sich that cannot be thought is existing, with which thinking has nothing at all to do. But how would it be possible for pure thinking to be able to cancel this difficulty, since as pure thinking it is abstract? But from what does pure thinking abstract? From existence, consequently from what it is supposed to explain.

Since thought abstracts from existence, Kierkegaard identified Descartes' "cogito ergo sum," as well as Anselm's ontological argument, as circular in nature. He writes:

The Cartesian cogito ergo sum [I think therefore I am] has been repeated often enough. If the I in cogito is understood to be an individual human being, then the statement demonstrates nothing: I am thinking ergo I am, but if I am thinking, no wonder, then, that I am; after all, it has already been said, and the first consequently says even more than the last.

Similar argument is also advanced against Anselm's proof of God:

When, for example, it is said: God must have all perfections, or the highest being must have all perfections, to be is also a perfection; ergo the highest being must be, or God must be—the whole movement is deceptive. That is, if in the first part of this statement God actually is not thought of as being, then the statement cannot come off at all. It will then run somewhat like this: A supreme being who, please note, does not exist, must be in possession of all perfections, among them also that of existing; ergo a supreme being who does not exist does exist. This would be a strange conclusion. The highest being must either not be in the beginning of the discourse in order to come into existence in the conclusion, and in that case it cannot come into existence; or the highest being was, and thus, of course, it cannot come into existence, in which case the conclusion is a fraudulent form of developing a predicate, a fraudulent paraphrase of a presupposition.

=== In psychology ===
Carl Jung's definition of abstraction broadened its scope beyond the thinking process to include exactly four mutually exclusive, different complementary psychological functions: sensation, intuition, feeling, and thinking. Together they form a structural totality of the differentiating abstraction process. Abstraction operates in one of these functions when it excludes the simultaneous influence of the other functions and other irrelevancies, such as emotion. Abstraction requires selective use of this structural split of abilities in the psyche. The opposite of abstraction is concretism. Abstraction is one of Jung's 57 definitions in Chapter XI of Psychological Types.

There is an abstract thinking, just as there is abstract feeling, sensation and intuition. Abstract thinking singles out the rational, logical qualities ... Abstract feeling does the same with... its feeling-values. ...I put abstract feelings on the same level as abstract thoughts. ...Abstract sensation would be aesthetic as opposed to sensuous sensation and abstract intuition would be symbolic as opposed to fantastic intuition. (Jung, [1921] (1971): par. 678).

=== In social theory ===
Social theorists deal with abstraction both as an ideational and as a material process. Alfred Sohn-Rethel (1899–1990) asked: "Can there be abstraction other than by thought?" He used the example of commodity abstraction to show that abstraction occurs in practice as people create systems of abstract exchange that extend beyond the immediate physicality of the object and yet have real and immediate consequences. This work was extended through the 'Constitutive Abstraction' approach of writers associated with the Journal Arena. Two books that have taken this theme of the abstraction of social relations as an organizing process in human history are Nation Formation: Towards a Theory of Abstract Community (1996) and an associated volume published in 2006, Globalism, Nationalism, Tribalism: Bringing Theory Back In. These books argue that a nation is an abstract community bringing together strangers who will never meet as such; thus constituting materially real and substantial, but abstracted and mediated relations. The books suggest that contemporary processes of globalization and mediatization have contributed to materially abstracting relations between people, with major consequences for how humans live their lives.

One can readily argue that abstraction is an elementary methodological tool in several disciplines of social science. These disciplines have definite and different concepts of "man" that highlight those aspects of man and his behaviour by idealization that are relevant for the given human science. For example, homo sociologicus is the man as sociology abstracts and idealizes it, depicting man as a social being. Moreover, we could talk about homo cyber sapiens (the man who can extend his biologically determined intelligence thanks to new technologies), or homo creativus (who is simply creative).

Abstraction (combined with Weberian idealization) plays a crucial role in economics - hence abstractions such as "the market" and the generalized concept of "business". Breaking away from directly experienced reality was a common trend in 19th-century sciences (especially physics), and this was the effort which fundamentally determined the way economics tried (and still tries) to approach the economic aspects of social life. It is abstraction we meet in the case of both Newton's physics and the neoclassical theory, since the goal was to grasp the unchangeable and timeless essence of phenomena. For example, Newton created the concept of the material point by following the abstraction method so that he abstracted from the dimension and shape of any perceptible object, preserving only inertial and translational motion. Material point is the ultimate and common feature of all bodies. Neoclassical economists created the indefinitely abstract notion of homo economicus by following the same procedure. Economists abstract from all individual and personal qualities in order to get to those characteristics that embody the essence of economic activity. Eventually, it is the substance of the economic man that they try to grasp. Any characteristic beyond it only disturbs the functioning of this essential core.

== See also ==
- Abstract art
- Abstract and concrete
- Abstract interpretation
- Abstract labour and concrete labour
- Abstract structure
- Abstraction (sociology)
- Charles Sanders Peirce
- Concept
- Conceptual model
- Emergence
- Engaged theory
- Gottlob Frege
- High- and low-level
- Hypostatic abstraction
- Inventor's paradox
- Leaky abstraction
- Lyrical abstraction
- Object of the mind
- Platonic realism
- Reification (knowledge representation)
- Symbol
- Theory
