= Event perception =

Cognitive parsing of time into event categories

Event perception is a cognitive process responsible for partitioning the continuous flow of conscious experience into discrete, meaningful units called events. It is a form of categorization that binds entities such as objects, actions, or activities to settings, often in an ordered sequence. Events can be organized by multiple factors, such as the causal relations or statistical associations between their components, or by a goal subserved by the set of actions within the event. Abstract event categories, called event schemas, are stored in long term memory and are instantiated in working memory representations of the ongoing event, called event models, which are maintained and updated as perceptual stimuli fluctuate.

Richmond & Zacks (2017) argued that event models enable prediction of the near future with greater accuracy than is possible without an event structure, and are therefore adaptive in allowing the agent to anticipate future states of their environment and plan their actions accordingly. According to Event Segmentation Theory, predictions made by an event model are continuously compared with observed changes in the environment. When an event model's predictions deviate sufficiently from observation, the model is updated to reflect the start of a new event, producing an event boundary. Successive modifications to working event models contribute to an overarching event structure that is preserved in episodic memory. The locations of event boundaries in episodic memory produce systematic distortions in memory, such as time dilation and ordering effects.

== Event structure ==
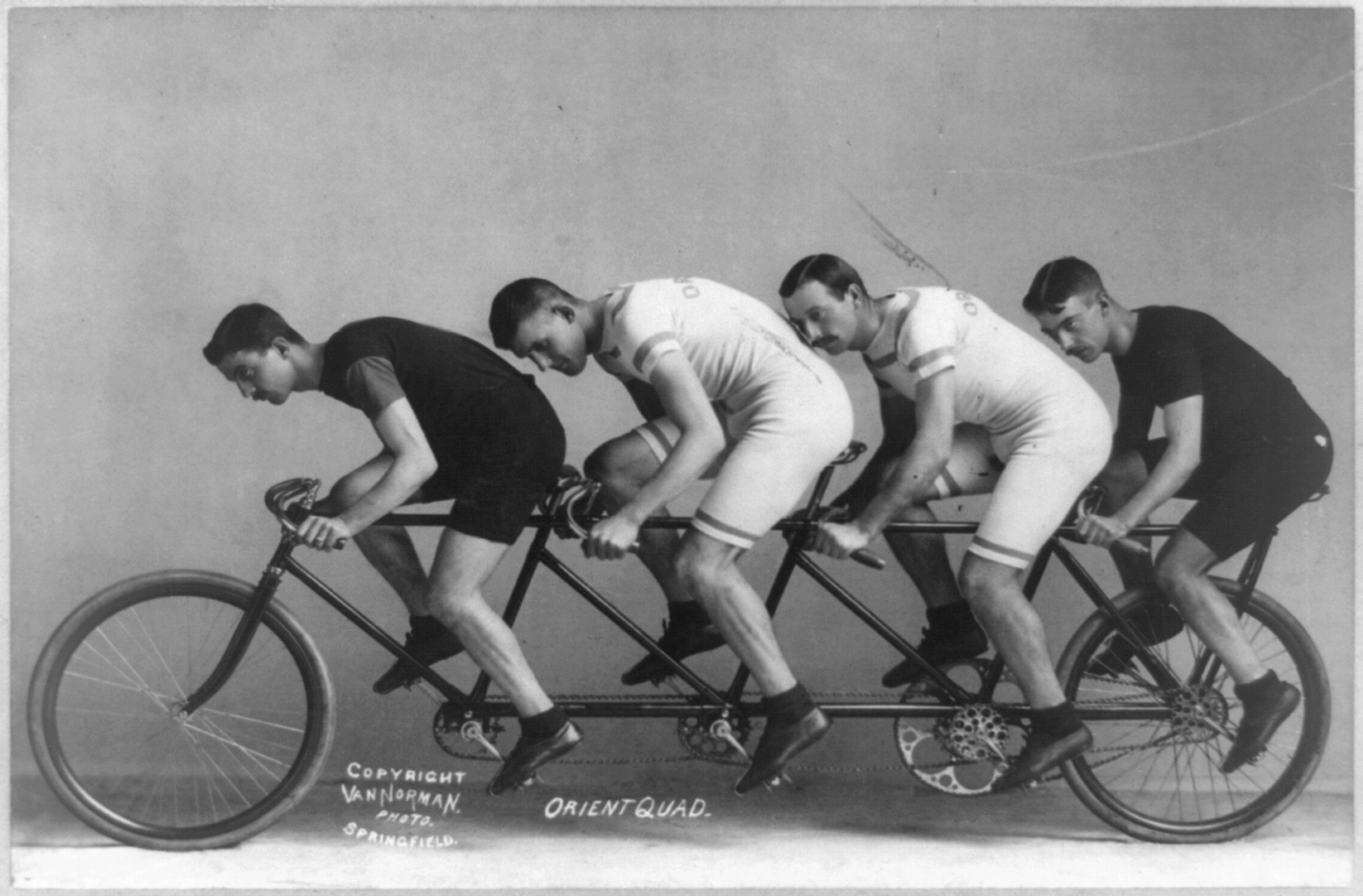
Going for a bike ride is a possible basic level description for this event.

Individuals use characteristic descriptions to describe events, which reflect both the content and level of abstraction of the underlying cognitive representations. Early research conducted by Eleanor Rosch identified a level of abstraction for describing events that is consistent both within and across individuals, called the basic level of event categorization. Examples of basic level event categories include taking a walk, attending a concert, driving to work, or baking a cake. Each of these events can be decomposed into finer components. For instance, the action of preparing breakfast may include cracking eggs and setting the table. Likewise, basic level events may combine into larger, superordinate events, just as getting dressed, watering plants, and preparing breakfast might all belong to a morning routine. In this manner, events form partonomies where each event consists of a set of subordinate events and exists within a larger superordinate event. For events defined by an agent performing an action, different actions done on the same object typically map to fine-grained events while actions done on different objects map to coarser events. Event structures are condensed in episodic memory; as a consequence remembered events are often described at a higher level of abstraction compared with descriptions used for ongoing events.

=== Event schemas ===
When an event is partitioned into subordinate events, the components are often organized in a predictable sequence. A sequence of event units may be enforced by necessary conditions (e.g. before flipping an omelet you must first crack the eggs), or by convention (e.g. it is customary for a singer to perform the national anthem before the first inning of a baseball game). The sequence of event units may resemble a program of action, or script. The structure of an event category is defined by its corresponding event schema. Event schemas are formed in semantic memory when temporally contiguous stimuli are regularly correlated. According to the 'cut-hypothesis', a set of correlated activity is separated from temporally adjacent stimuli and schematized if the same grouping of stimuli is experienced across many different contexts.

Models of schema induction rely on intuitive statistics, which are derived from other cognitive processes allowing the observer to encode correlations between occurrences of stimuli from their experience. Zwann et al. (1995) argued that certain dimensions of perceptual input are especially important for detecting statistical regularities relevant to event categories, including context similarity, relation to a particular goal, and the presence of particular object, roles, or actors. According to their Event-Indexing Model, the more dimensions along which a group of stimuli co-occur, the more readily a schematic event representation is formed. Hence, stimuli that frequently co-occur in a particular setting (e.g. a hospital), involve similar actions (e.g. measuring blood pressure), share a common goal (e.g. promote physical health), involve the same roles or actors (e.g. doctors and nurses), and follow a predictable temporal order are most likely to be grouped into an event category (e.g. medical appointment).

Under certain conditions statistical dependencies between event units may yield knowledge of causal relations. Cheng's (1997) model of causal inference stipulates that causal relations can be derived from the statistical association between two factors when the putative cause reliably precedes the effect and when no plausible confounding variable can account for their co-occurrence. An event schema's predictive utility is bolstered when its sequential components are linked by causal relationships, which Cheng and Lu (2017) attribute to causal relationships being more invariant (i.e. robust to changes in background conditions) than non-causal associations.

== Event models ==
Zacks & Richmond (2018) suggest event schemas are useful to the extent that they inform predictions about the near future. Applying schemata to perceptual input involves separate cognitive mechanisms, responsible for instantiating event schemas in working memory representations of the ongoing event; these representations are referred to as event models. Event schemas differ in their level of abstraction and timescales, where fine-grained events may last only a few seconds (e.g. discarding leftovers in a bin), while more coarsely grained events can extend from minutes to hours (e.g. going for a hike). In order for multiple event schemas of different timescales to be incorporated within working memory, Baldassano and colleagues suggest that neural systems are specialized to process event information over a particular temporal frequency, receiving input from circuits that accumulate information over shorter intervals and passing their output to circuits that accumulate information over longer intervals, forming an event processing hierarchy. Neuroimaging research supports this idea, as several cortical areas appear to encode events lasting specific temporal frequencies, with mid-level sensory regions integrating information over timescales of a few seconds, and higher-order regions, such as the posterior and frontal medial cortex, angular gyrus, and temporoparietal junction, integrating information across timescales ranging up to several minutes.

=== Event segmentation theory ===
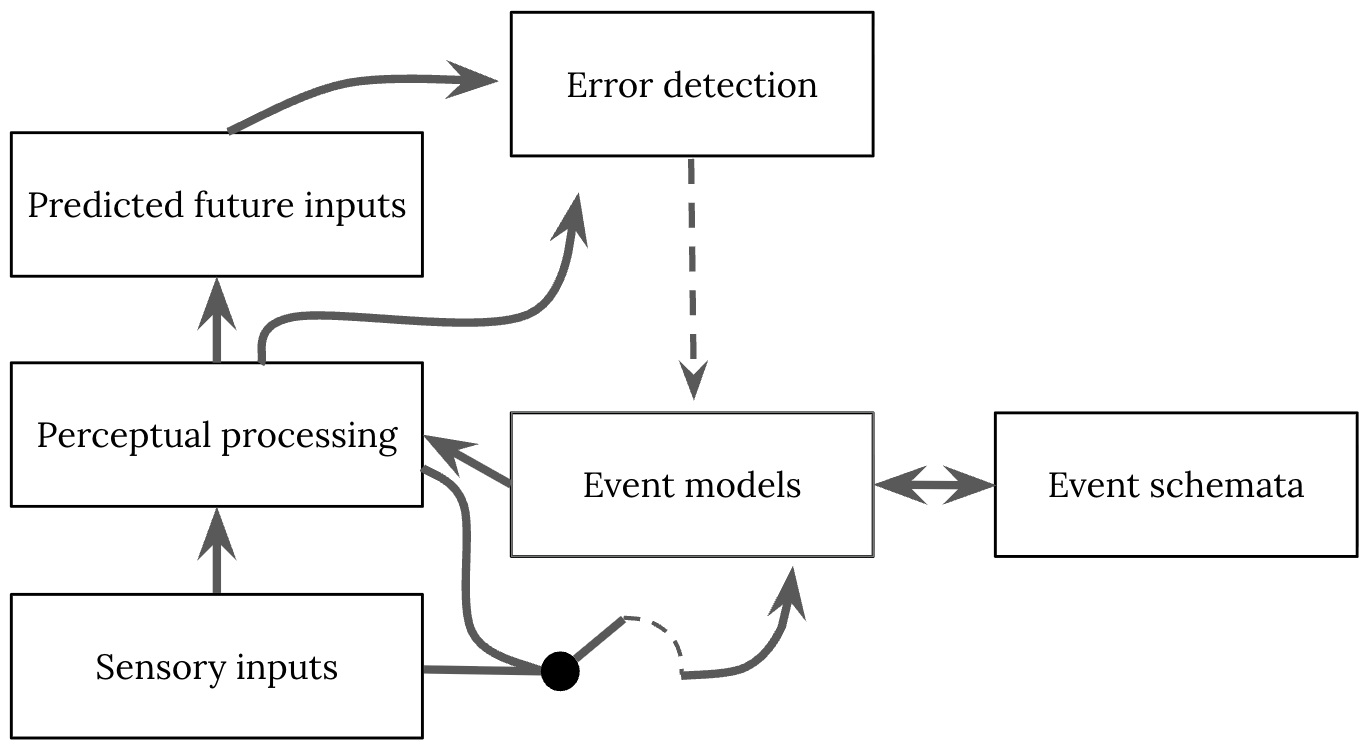
Event Segmentation Theory. Sensory input is processed with reference to current event models, generating predictions about the future. When prediction error spikes an attention gate opens and the event models are updated.

In Event Segmentation Theory, or EST, the present moment is represented hierarchically in working memory, with fine-grained event models nested within coarser event models. Many event schemata can map to event models and inform predictions for how sensory input will change over the time course specified by the respective schema. Prediction error is monitored across all event models, and whenever there is a transient spike of error in model prediction the event model at the appropriate level is updated, while higher levels may remain stable. The process of updating event models in response to changes in the environment is called event segmenting, and produces event boundaries. The end of an event signals the opening of an attention gate, which increases sampling of the environment to inform how the event model should be updated and assist in searching for relevant event schemas. In the process of updating, prediction error decreases until the event model returns to a stable state and the attention gate closes. Event models not only respond to sensory input, but also shape sensory input through biasing attention toward features in the environment that are relevant to the current event model.

=== Limits of working memory ===
Working memory has limited capacity, being able to store a maximum of 5-9 chunks of information at once. In order to support rich, computationally intensive event representations, this limitation is mitigated by event models' reliance on schemata stored in semantic memory. When event schemata are instantiated in event models, the accessibility of those long term representations are temporarily heightened, effectively reducing working memory load. This is referred to as 'long-term working memory'.

== Relation to episodic memory ==
Episodic memories are structured according to how events were segmented at the time of encoding. Events experienced in the present become the 'episodes' stored in long term memory. Moreover, event boundaries serve as anchors for retrieval, as memory for stimuli that occur near a boundary is enhanced compared with stimuli that occur in the middle of an event. Event Segmentation Theory provides an explanation for this effect; in EST, event boundaries signal to update current event models, which in turn heightens attention to stimuli in the environment. This heightened attention strengthens encoding for information present at the boundary and facilitates later retrieval.

Event boundaries can also lead to forgetting. According to EST, when event models are updated, information belonging to the prior event is discarded from working memory. This accounts for the short-term memory loss commonly experienced when people walk through doorways, or change tasks. The "doorway effect" is observed even when participants traverse virtual spaces in VR, or imagine themselves walking through a doorway.

=== Event horizon model ===
The Event Horizon Model was developed in order to resolve the apparent contradiction that boundaries can facilitate both remembering and forgetting. The Event Horizon Model is summarized by five principles:

1. The segmentation of streams of activity into event units
2. The superior availability of information in the working event model
3. The construction of a causal network that can then influence retrieval
4. The superiority of memory for information stored across multiple events in noncompetitive attribute retrieval
5. The occurrence of retrieval interference for information stored across multiple events in competitive event retrieval.

Principles 1 and 2 follow from Event Segmentation Theory, and make explicit the consequences of updating event models for later retrieval. From principle 3, the event horizon model predicts that boundary induced forgetting can be mitigated when information across an event boundary is connected through causal relationships. The presence of causal relationships linking successive stimuli promote retrieval generally, as they allow top-down knowledge about causes to scaffold the recall of their subsequent effects. Principle 4 expresses that separating information across multiple events may actually serve to organize the information, since retrieving content from an event inhibits retrieval of other associated content within that event. Event boundaries separate the memory traces of content belonging to different events, thereby reducing competition during recall. Lastly, principle 5 describes memory interference that occurs when many episodic memories share similar event structures and therefore compete during retrieval. For example, if an individual always parks their car in the parking lot at their workplace, when they attempt to remember where they parked their car later in the day, episodes from previous days may be activated and interfere, resulting in forgetting.

=== Time distortions in memory ===
Remembered time is distorted at event boundaries, such that the perceived duration between items that occurred in different events is remembered as being longer than the actual duration. Event boundaries disrupt the encoding of temporal order for items that span the boundary, resulting in lower accuracy of temporal order judgments for cross-boundary items compared to within-boundary items. Perceived time is also distorted by the event structure of ongoing events, contracting within events and expanding between events, although these distortions are not as pronounced as they are for remembered events.

== Individual differences ==
=== Aging ===
The volume of certain cortical areas, particularly the prefrontal cortex, shrink as people age, which can severely compromise working memory and attention. Since event segmentation relies on working memory and attention, older adults may deviate from normative patterns of event segmentation. Within the framework of Event Segmentation Theory, aging specifically compromises the ability to direct attention to event-relevant stimuli in the environment and update event models accordingly. Aging related differences in event segmentation are thought to partially explain the decline of episodic memory in older adults, since episodic memory is structured according to the event segmentation instantiated at encoding.
