= Abstraction principle =

Abstraction principle may refer to:

- Abstraction principle (law)
- Abstraction principle (computer programming)
