= Abstract – The Art of Design =

2017 documentary television series about designers

Abstract: The Art of Design
- Genre: Documentary
- Created by: Scott Dadich
- Composers: Mark Mothersbaugh; Timo Elliston; Brian Jones
- Original language: English
- No. of seasons: 2
- No. of episodes: 14

Production
- Executive producers: Scott Dadich; Morgan Neville; Dave O'Connor; Jon Kamen; Justin Wilkes; Jason Spingarn-Koff; Ben Cotner; Lisa Nishimura
- Producers: Billy Sorrentino; Sarina Roma; Paula Chowles
- Cinematography: Luke Geissbühler
- Running time: 42–48 minutes
- Production companies: RadicalMedia; Tremolo Productions; Godfrey Dadich Partners

Original release
- Network: Netflix
- Release: February 10, 2017 – September 25, 2019

Abstract: The Art of Design is a Netflix original documentary series highlighting artists in the field of design. It was released on Netflix on February 10, 2017. The series was created by former Wired editor-in-chief Scott Dadich.

The first season profiled illustrator Christoph Niemann, Nike shoe designer Tinker Hatfield, stage designer Es Devlin, architect Bjarke Ingels, automotive designer Ralph Gilles, graphic designer Paula Scher, photographer Platon, and interior designer Ilse Crawford.

In 2019, Netflix announced that the series had been renewed for a second season, which was released on September 25, 2019.

== Episodes ==
Season	Episodes	Originally released
1	8	February 10, 2017
2	6	September 25, 2019

=== Season 1 (2017) ===
No. overall	No. in season	Title	Directed by	Original release date
1	1	"Christoph Niemann: Illustration"	Morgan Neville	February 10, 2017
2	2	"Tinker Hatfield: Footwear Design"	Brian Oakes	February 10, 2017
3	3	"Es Devlin: Stage Design"	Brian Oakes	February 10, 2017
4	4	"Bjarke Ingels: Architecture"	Morgan Neville	February 10, 2017
5	5	"Ralph Gilles: Automotive Design"	Elizabeth Chai Vasarhelyi	February 10, 2017
6	6	"Paula Scher: Graphic Design"	Richard Press	February 10, 2017
7	7	"Platon: Photography"	Richard Press	February 10, 2017
8	8	"Ilse Crawford: Interior Design"	Sarina Roma	February 10, 2017

=== Season 2 (2019) ===
No. overall	No. in season	Title	Directed by	Original release date
9	1	"Olafur Eliasson: The Design of Art"	Jason Zeldes	September 25, 2019
10	2	"Neri Oxman: Bio-Architecture"	Morgan Neville	September 25, 2019
11	3	"Ruth Carter: Costume Design"	Claudia Woloshin	September 25, 2019
12	4	"Cas Holman: Design for Play"	Elizabeth Chai Vasarhelyi	September 25, 2019
13	5	"Ian Spalter: Digital Product Design"	Scott Dadich	September 25, 2019
14	6	"Jonathan Hoefler: Typeface Design"	Brian Oakes	September 25, 2019
