= Anji Play =

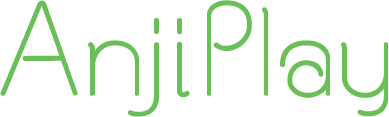
- Invented by: Cheng Xueqin
- Company: Anji Play World
- Country: China
- Availability: 2014–present
- Slogan: Love, Risk, Joy, Engagement, Reflection
- Official website

Anji Play (Chinese: 安吉游戏) is an early childhood curriculum designed by Cheng Xueqin, Director, Office of Pre-Primary Education, Anji County Department of Education, Zhejiang Province. The key elements that make up Anji Play are its pedagogy, site-specific environments, unique materials and integrated technology. The focus of the program is the participating children's self-determination in choosing what, where, and with whom to play and the role of the teacher as observer, particularly in instances of physical risk. Anji Play is the full-time curriculum of all public kindergartens in Anji County.

== History ==
=== Origin ===
In 1989, China signed United Nations Convention on the Rights of the Child. Article 31 recognizes "the rights of the child to rest and leisure, to engage in play and recreational activities appropriate to the age of the child and to participate freely in cultural life and the arts."

In 1996, Ministry of Education of the People's Republic of China released the "Standards for Kindergarten Education." It views play in kindergarten as a "foundational activity to be included in every type of educational activity" – i.e. play is a must in education.

Starting in 2001, Anji Play was entirely developed outside of the influence of Western educational philosophy, though the program’s tenets and the methods used to develop it share resemblances with Montessori and Froebel. Although Anji Play’s initial development met resistance from parents, a parent outreach program was implemented to teach the value of play in education.

=== Expansion ===
Today Anji Play is internationally recognized as an early-childhood curriculum used in 130 public kindergartens in Anji County, China. It has expanded internationally and is being adapted in the United States beginning with One City Early Learning Centers in Madison, Wisconsin and by the Madison Public Library.

== Philosophy ==
In Anji Play’s current implementation, children have at least two hours of free play every day. Play environments are outdoors with minimal structuring, and simple tools made of natural materials (i.e., ropes, light bamboo ladders, basic clay pots) are provided as toys, instead of objects sold and marketed as toys. During play time, teachers observe, document, and act as parallel participants.

Anji Play is composed of simple tools made of natural materials such as clay pots, ropes, light bamboo ladders and other everyday objects like barrels and tires. Children in the Anji Play environment interact with these objects to create their own playground govern by their own rules. Inherently through Anji Play, children collaborate develop social and motor skills in order to play.

Adults and instructors are advised to not intervene and instruct, but to observe. From an outside perspective, instructors are taught to trust the children and understand how children navigate conflict and collaboration.

This style of non-instructed play defines the phrase '"True Play"'. Anji Play outlines the True Play philosophy in several categories (split between "Children's Rights" and "Teacher/adult responsibilities"):

- Self-Determined Play
- Time and Space
- Reflection
- Expression
- Materials
- Environments

== See also ==
- Reggio Emilia approach
