= Formal semantics =

Formal semantics may refer to:

- Formal semantics (natural language), the empirical study of meaning in natural language using formal models
- Formal semantics or semantics of logic, the mathematical study of the interpretations of formal languages
- Formal semantics or semantics (computer science), the mathematical study of the interpretations of programming languages
