= Christoph Niemann =

Illustrator, graphic designer

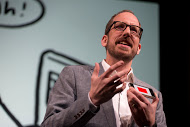
- Niemann at Typo San Francisco 2013
- Born: 1970 (age 55–56); Waiblingen, West Germany
- Education: State Academy of Fine Arts in Stuttgart
- Website: www.christophniemann.com

Christoph Niemann (born 1970) is a German-American illustrator, graphic designer, and children's book author.

Since July 2008, Niemann has been writing and illustrating The New York Times blog Abstract City, renamed Abstract Sunday in 2011, when the blog moved to The New York Times Magazine.

== Personal life ==
He studied at the State Academy of Fine Arts in Stuttgart under Heinz Edelmann.

After finishing his studies in Germany in 1997, he moved to New York City. After 11 years in New York City, he moved to Berlin with his wife, Lisa, and their three sons.

== Career ==
Niemann is known for his Sunday Sketches, a weekly series of humorous drawings that play with scale and position. His compositions often take objects and turn them into something unexpected, for example a red pencil into a megaphone or a splayed book into a cat's whiskers.

His work has appeared on the covers of The New Yorker, Atlantic Monthly, The New York Times Magazine and American Illustration, and has won awards from AIGA, the Art Directors Club and American Illustration.

Niemann is a member of the Alliance Graphique Internationale. He has been a speaker at Design Indaba Conference twice, in 2006 and 2013.

In 2010, he was inducted into the Art Directors Club Hall of Fame.

In 2013, he launched his first interactive illustration at Design Indaba Conference in Cape Town, in the form of an iOS application called Petting Zoo by Christoph Niemann. On June 21, 2013, Google used two of his images to celebrate the 2013 summer and winter solstices as the Google Doodle of the day. Niemann was profiled in the first season of the Netflix docu-series, Abstract: The Art of Design.

Niemann produced Traffic Pong in 2019, a video art piece that depicts a game of Pong superimposed over aerial footage of traffic over Paulista Avenue in São Paulo. The vehicles would interact with the ball and affect the game at large.

== Books ==
- (2000) Fresh Dialogue 1, New Voices in Graphic Design (with Nicholas Blechman, Paul Sahre and Paula Scher). ISBN 978-1-56898-223-6.
- (2005) 100% Evil (with Nicholas Blechman and Chip Kidd). ISBN 978-1-56898-526-8.
- (2007) The Police Cloud. ISBN 978-0-375-83963-4.
- (2007) The Boy with Two Belly Buttons (with Stephen J. Dubner). ISBN 978-0-06-113402-9.
- (2008) The Pet Dragon: A Story about Adventure, Friendship, and Chinese Characters.
  - (2008) in German: Der kleine Drache. ISBN 978-3-941087-00-2.
- (2009) Windsbraut written by T.C.Boyle, illustrated by Christoph Niemann.
- (2010) SUBWAY. ISBN 978-0-06-157779-6.
- (2010) I LEGO N.Y.. ISBN 978-0-8109-8490-5.
  - (2010) I LEGO N.Y. (German edition) ISBN 978-3-86873-279-5.
- (2011) That's How. ISBN 978-0-06-201963-9.
- (2012) Abstract City. (English edition) ISBN 978-1-4197-0207-5.
  - (2012) Abstract City - Mein Leben unterm Strich. (German edition) ISBN 978-3-86873-456-0.
- (2012) Der Kartoffelkönig. ISBN 978-3-941087-49-1.
- Niemann, Christoph & Nicholas Blechman. Conversations.
- Niemann, Christoph. Souvenir.
- Niemann, Christoph. Sunday sketching.
- Niemann, Christoph. Hopes and dreams.
- Niemann, Christoph. Zoo.
- Niemann, Christoph. Pianoforte.

== Awards and honors ==
- Design Awards Recipient, AIGA, 2003, 2005
- Certificate of Typographic Excellence, Type Directors Club (TDC New York), 2006
- Inducted into the Art Directors Club Hall of Fame, 2010
