= Abstract (law) =

Summary of a legal document

In law, an abstract is a brief statement that contains the main information of a long legal document or of several related legal papers.

== Types of legislation ==
The abstract title, used in real estate transactions, is the more common form of abstract. An abstract title lists all the owners of a piece of land, a house, or a building before it came into possession of the present owner. The abstract also records all deeds, wills, mortgages, and other documents that affect ownership of the property. An abstract describes a chain of transfers from owner to owner and any agreements by former owners that are binding on later owners.

== Patent law ==
In the context of patent law and specifically in prior art searches, searching through abstracts is a common way to find relevant prior art document to question for novelty or inventive step (or non-obviousness in United States patent law) of an invention. Under United States patent law, the abstract may be called "Abstract of the Disclosure".
