= Platon (photographer) =

British photographer

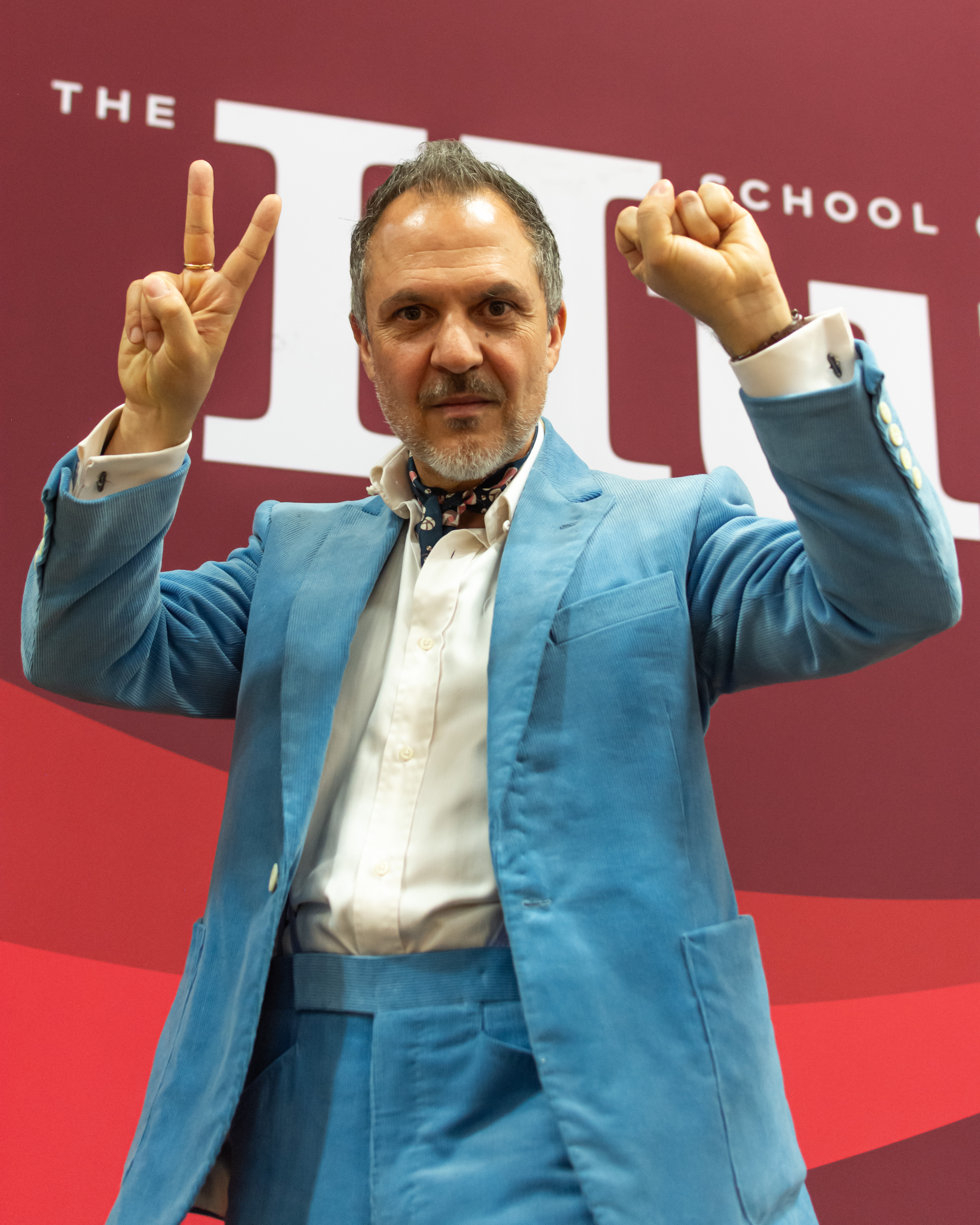
- Born: Platon Antoniou; 20 April 1968 (age 58); Greece
- Known for: Photography
- Website: www.platonphoto.com

Platon (born Platon Antoniou, born 20 April 1968) is a British portrait and documentary photographer.

== Biography ==
Platon was born on 20 April 1968 in London, but raised in the Greek Isles, until his family returned to England in the 1970s. His father Jim Antoniou was a Greek architect and illustrator, and his mother is an art historian. He moved to England at the age of 8. Platon studied graphic design at Saint Martin's School of Art where he had his first experience with photography. He went on to receive his master's degree in fine arts from the Royal College of Art where he met his instructor and mentor, John Hind of Vogue. As of 2019, Platon was married and had two children.

== Career ==
After leaving college in 1992, Platon began his career in fashion photography and portraiture. He moved from London to New York to begin his commercial career with John Kennedy Jr. at George magazine. Some of Platon's commercial work includes photographing for Levi's, IBM, Nike, Motorola, Timex, Tanqueray, Kenneth Cole, and Ray-Ban. His photographs have also been featured on the covers of magazines including Time, Esquire, Wired, and George. In 2008, Platon became a staff photographer for The New Yorker, where he handled large-scale projects like photographing the Little Rock Nine for his first assignment that celebrated the civil rights movement.

== Aesthetic ==
Platon's father helped him develop an understanding of form and texture through the principles of Modernism reflected in his bold no distraction style. His graphic design education influences how he takes his photographs, which he shoots with the final graphic treatment in mind. According to Platon, he aims to capture the truth, to "find it and bring it out". He works with limited sessions for photo shoots, sometimes capturing his photos within a 30-second timeframe, which he said makes his photographs more "intense" and "authentic".

== The People's Portfolio ==
Platon founded the People's Portfolio, a nonprofit organization. Platon photographs those who are fighting for civil and human rights, giving a voice to those who are unheard. His portfolios include photographs of Burmese victims and exiles, Egyptian revolutionaries, and those fighting against oppression in Russia. Platon has also photographed and interviewed women from the Congo who have experienced sexual violence. He has collaborated with the Human Rights Watch, the National Center for Civil and Human Rights, ExxonMobil and the UN Foundation. Through the People's Portfolio, Platon aims to raise awareness of those facing oppression.

== Notable works ==
Platon has photographed many well-known leaders. Bill Clinton was the first president that he worked with and photographed. His other photographs of well-known leaders include Donald Trump, Muammar al Qaddafi, Barack Obama, George W. Bush, and Muhammad Ali.

His photograph of Vladimir Putin was on the cover of Time in 2007.

Platon's first solo exhibition was held at the Leica Gallery in New York and showcased documentary photographs from Colombia and India.

He currently has three published books. His book Platon's Republic was published in 2004 featuring his photographs of prominent figures commissioned by magazines. Service Platon is a collection of photographs that highlight the physical and psychological wounds and courage of soldiers and their families. Power Platon, published in 2011, is a historical record of prominent political figures of the twenty-first century.

Platon was profiled in the first season of the Netflix docu-series Abstract: The Art of Design.

His photograph of Donald Trump was on the cover of Time in 2024.
