= Plural of abstraction =

Using the plural form to indicate abstraction

The plural of abstraction, or plurale abstractum (Latin for "abstract plural"), is the linguistic phenomenon of using a plural form to turn a concrete idea into an abstract state or quality. The logic of the phenomenon can be described as the plural manifesting the various concrete manifestations of a quality or of a state, to refer to the quality or state in its generality: for example, the Hebrew verb נִשָּׂא (nissa) denotes the individual act "to become married", and the derived plural form נִשּׂוּאִין (nissuin) manifests the specific instances together to refer to the institution of marriage.

== Hebrew ==
The phenomenon is most commonly discussed in the context of Hebrew, notably by Gesenius, Joüon, and Waltke and O’Connor. Examples include זְקוּנִים 'old age' from זָקֵן 'old person', מְגוּרִים 'residence' from גָּר 'to dwell', and רַחֲמִים 'mercy' from רִחֵם 'to have mercy on'. The word for God, אֱלֹהִים, is often supposed to arise from a plural of abstraction to refer to "divinity", as Gesenius himself and others point out. Other examples include חַיִּים 'life', בְּתוּלִים 'virginity', פְּלִילִים 'criminal law', נִשּׂוּאִין 'marriage', גֵּרוּשִׁין 'divorce', אֵרוּסִין 'betrothal'.

It is distinct from pluralis excellentiae.

== English ==
Examples include politics, ethics, physics, morals, nuptials, amends, surroundings, outskirts, remains, riches.

== French ==
Examples include ténèbres (darkness), richesses (riches), mœurs (morals), fiançailles (betrothal), funérailles (funeral), noces (wedding), alentours (surroundings).

== Latin ==
Examples include tenebrae (darkness), divitiae (riches), nuptiae (nuptials), castra (military camp), insidiae (ambush).
