= Abstraction principle (law) =

Principle in German law

The abstract system of title transfer (German: Abstraktionsprinzip) is a legal term in German law relating to the law of obligations (Schuldrecht) and property law (Sachenrecht). Although no express reference to it is made in the German Civil Code (BGB), the concept of separating a personal undertaking to pay or exchange goods or legal rights (e.g. through contract) from the conveyance of title to those goods or legal rights (e.g. through a deed or land registration) is fundamental to German private law (as well as Brazilian law, Greek law, South African law, and Scots law).

== General features ==
Abstract title transfer is based on the Roman maxim traditionibus non nudis pactis dominia rerum transferuntur: ownership is transferred by delivery and not by contract alone. The abstract system dominates the entire BGB and is vital for the understanding of how it treats legal transactions, such as contracts. For example, under the BGB's system, ownership is not transferred by a sale contract, as in some other jurisdictions (e.g. France, Italy, etc.). Instead, the sale contract merely obligates the seller to transfer ownership of the good sold to the buyer, while the buyer is obligated to pay the stipulated price. The buyer does not automatically gain ownership by virtue of the contract of sale whereas the seller has not automatically gained ownership of the money. Article 433 of the BGB explicitly states this obligation of the seller, as well as the buyer's obligation to pay the agreed upon price and take the thing he bought. So, seller and buyer have just made reciprocal undertakings and gained reciprocal obligations. For transfer of ownership, another contract is necessary which is governed by §§ 929 et seq. Thus, in a simple purchase of goods paid immediately in cash, German civil law interprets the transaction as (at least) three contracts: the contract of sale itself, obligating the seller to transfer ownership of the product to the buyer and the buyer to pay the price; a contract that transfers ownership of the product to the buyer, fulfilling the seller's obligation; and a contract that transfers ownership of the money (bills and coins) from the buyer to the seller, fulfilling the buyer's obligation.

This does not mean that contracts in Germany are more complicated to the people involved. Especially the contracts of everyday life do not differ from those in other countries in their outer appearance. For instance, if someone buys a newspaper at a newsstand without saying one single word to the seller, all the three abovementioned contracts are performed and can be construed to have been performed from the parties' behavior.

== Function ==
Although abstract title transfer seemingly contradicts the usual common sense interpretation of commercial transactions, it is undisputed among the German legal community. The main advantage of the abstract system is its ability to provide a secure legal construction to nearly any financial transaction however complicated this transaction may be. A good example is retention of title. If someone buys something and pays the purchase price by installments, the system faces two conflicting interests: the buyer wants to have the purchased goods immediately, whereas the seller wants to secure full payment of the purchase price. Under abstract title transfer, the BGB has a simple answer to that: the purchase contract obligates the buyer to pay the full price and requires the seller to transfer property upon receipt of the last installment. Since the obligations and the actual conveyance of title are in two different contracts, it is quite simple to secure both parties' interests. The seller retains title up to the last payment, and the buyer is merely the holder of the purchased goods. If he fails to pay in full the seller may reclaim his property just like any other owner.

== Critics ==
Critics say that what German legal scholars call Verpflichtungsgeschäft and Verfügungsgeschäft (i.e. undertakings vs. conveyance) are actually the same thing, but expressed in other words. Stating that this difference turns the transaction into something more secure is a false inference. In fact, all other jurisdictions preserve the same certainty through other legal doctrines and devices in their civil codes, not necessarily demanding a double-analysis of the same matter and treating it like two different legal acts.

This is the main criticism of those jurisdictions that follow the opposite system, the causal system of title transfer (Germ: Kausalprinzip or Prinzip der kausalen Tradition), which follows the canon law maxim solo consensus obligat, under which the meeting of the minds in a contract of sale is sufficient both to create obligations and convey title. This includes mainly jurisdictions that have adopted or been influenced by the Napoleonic Code, e.g. France, Louisiana, Quebec, Portugal, French-speaking Africa, much of Latin America, etc.

== See also ==
- Bürgerliches Gesetzbuch
